= 2014 United States Senate election in Maine =

- November 4, 2014
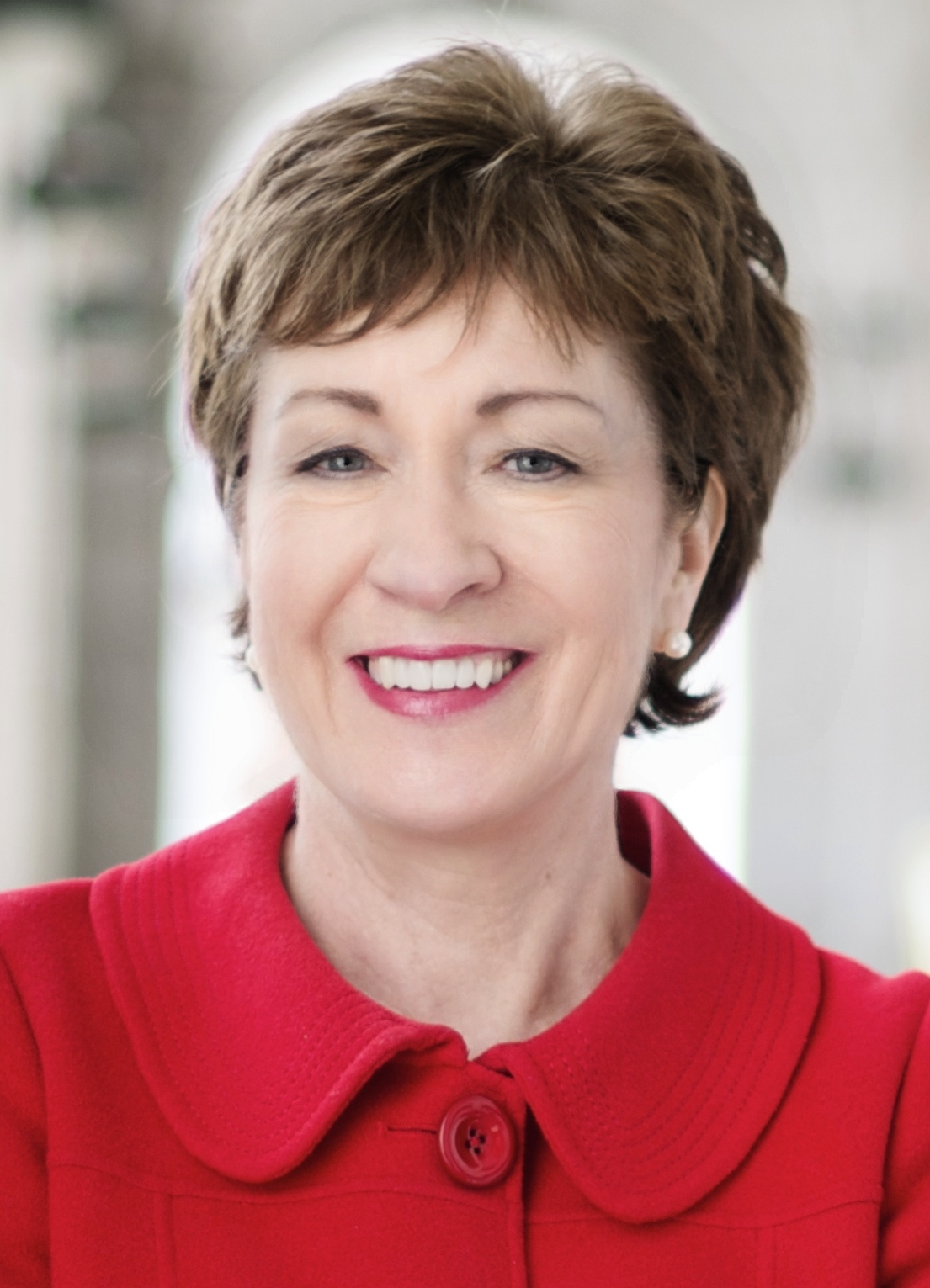

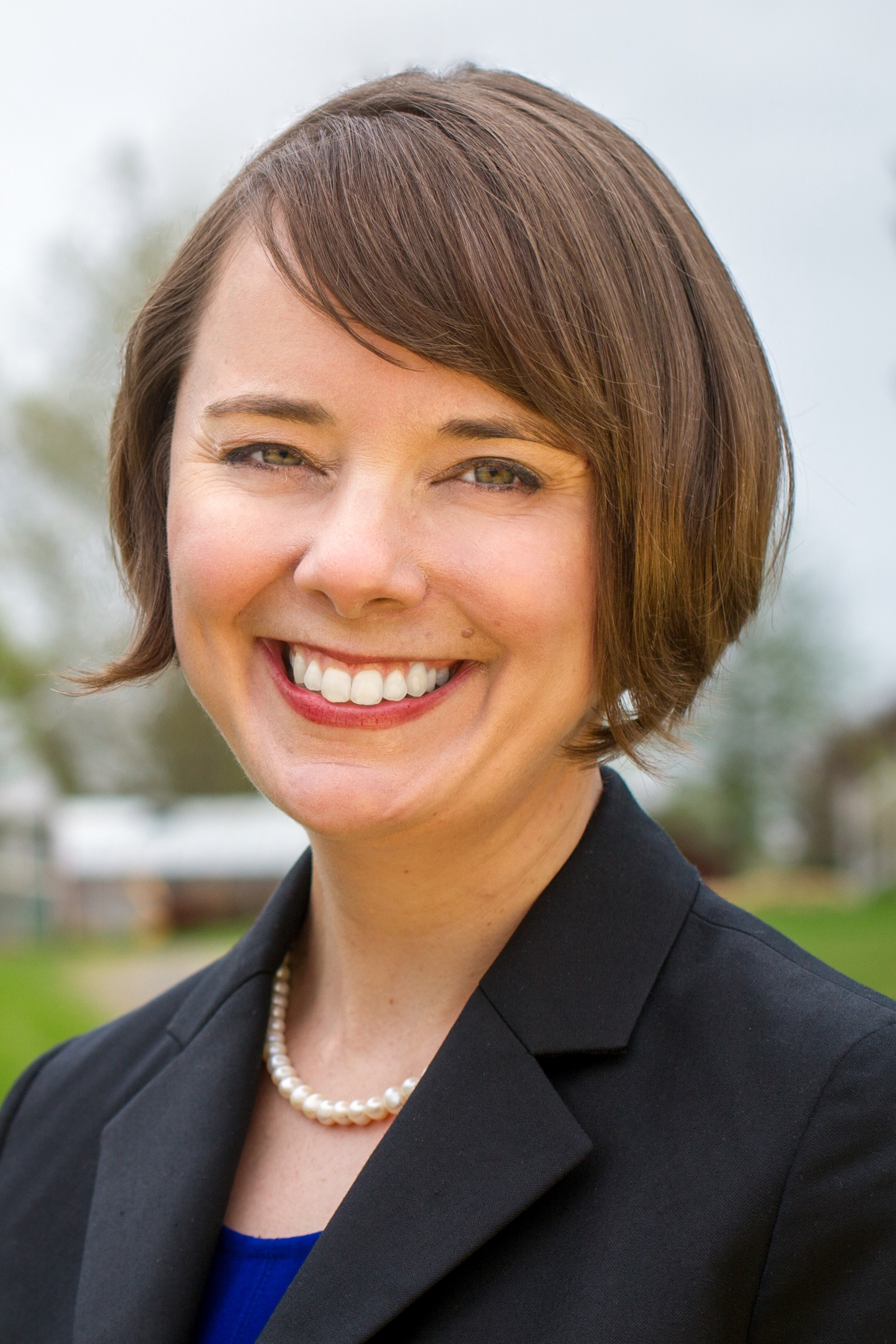
Nominee	Susan Collins	Shenna Bellows
Party	Republican	Democratic
Popular vote	413,495	190,244
Percentage	68.46%	31.50%
- Collins: 50–60% 60–70% 70–80% 80–90% >90% Bellows: 50–60% 60–70% >90%
U.S. senator before election
Susan Collins
Republican
Elected U.S. Senator
Susan Collins
Republican

The 2014 United States Senate election in Maine took place on November 4, 2014. Incumbent Republican Senator Susan Collins, who had served in the position since 1997, won election to a fourth term in office with 68.5% of the vote. The primary elections were held on June 10, 2014. This was the only Republican-held Senate seat up for election in a state that Barack Obama won in the 2012 presidential election.

As of 2026, this was the last time a Republican won the counties of Cumberland and Knox in a statewide election, and the last time any party carried every county in Maine.

== Republican primary ==
=== Candidates ===
==== Declared ====
- Susan Collins, incumbent U.S. senator

==== Write-in candidates ====
- Erick Bennett, conservative activist and director of the Maine Equal Rights Center (unenrolled as a Republican, see Campaign section)

==== Declined ====
- Scott D'Amboise, former Lisbon Falls selectman and candidate for the U.S. Senate in 2012
- Bruce Poliquin, former state treasurer, candidate for governor in 2010 and candidate for the U.S. Senate in 2012 (ran for ME-02)
- Mark Willis, former Maine Republican national committeeman

=== Campaign ===
Maine Republican Party Chairman Rick Bennett was critical of Erick Bennett's campaign, stating that he did not believe Erick would get the necessary signatures to get on the ballot. After making it clear the two men are not related, Rick felt that this would be due to Erick's views as expressed on his Facebook page. These included referring to U.S. Representative Mike Michaud as a "closet homo" and criticism of Nelson Mandela, comparing him to Stalin and Karl Marx. Furthermore, Erick Bennett was convicted in 2003 of assaulting his wife, which was upheld by the Maine Supreme Judicial Court, though he maintained his innocence. Rick Bennett stated that Erick's views "[did] not represent the views of the Republican Party".

Erick Bennett announced before the primary filing deadline on March 17 that he had left the Republican Party and would run as an independent. Maine law, however, requires that an independent candidate must have not been in a political party by March 1 of the election year in order to run as an independent, meaning Bennett could not legally run as such. The Kennebec Journal reported that Bennett was a write-in candidate for the Republican nomination.

On April 3, 2014, Collins' campaign announced the joint endorsement of Bath Iron Works' labor unions, which the campaign claimed was the first time the unions issued a joint endorsement as well as the first time they endorsed a Republican candidate for federal office.

Collins ultimately defeated Bellows in a landslide, carrying all 16 counties, both congressional districts, and nearly every municipality in the state. Bellows only won the heavily Democratic cities of Portland, Bar Harbor, and Hallowell, as well as a handful of small communities in extremely rural northern and western Maine with only a few dozen votes between them, such as Grand Falls Township and Elliottsville.

=== Polling ===
Hypothetical polling

Poll source	Date(s) administered	Sample size	Margin of error	Susan Collins	Bruce Poliquin	Undecided
Public Policy Polling	August 23–25, 2013	321	± 5.5%	64%	24%	12%

Poll source	Date(s) administered	Sample size	Margin of error	Susan Collins	Charlie Summers	Other	Undecided
Public Policy Polling	January 18–20, 2013	430	± 4.7%	58%	31%	—	11%

Poll source	Date(s) administered	Sample size	Margin of error	Susan Collins	Someone more conservative	Other	Undecided
Public Policy Polling	January 18–20, 2013	430	± 4.7%	49%	46%	—	6%
Public Policy Polling	August 23–25, 2013	321	± 5.5%	47%	48%	—	5%
Public Policy Polling	November 8–11, 2013	331	± 5.4%	48%	44%	—	7%

=== Results ===
Republican primary results
Party	Candidate	Votes	%
Republican	Susan Collins (incumbent)	59,767	100.00%
Total votes		59,767	100.00%

== Democratic primary ==
=== Candidates ===
==== Declared ====
- Shenna Bellows, former executive director of the American Civil Liberties Union of Maine

==== Declined ====
- Emily Cain, state senator (ran for ME-02)
- Mike Michaud, U.S. representative (ran for governor)

=== Results ===
Democratic primary results
Party	Candidate	Votes	%
Democratic	Shenna Bellows	65,085	100.00%
Total votes		65,085	100.00%

== Independents ==
To qualify as an independent candidate for the U.S. Senate in Maine, a person needs to submit at least 4,000 valid signatures to the secretary of state by June 1. Any independent candidate must not have been enrolled in a political party after March 1 of the year the election occurs.

Former Republican candidate Erick Bennett announced just before the March 17 primary filing deadline that he had left the Republican Party and would run as an independent, but Maine law required him to have unenrolled as a Republican by March 1 to do so. Therefore, he could not legally run as an independent.

=== Candidates ===
==== Declared ====
- Erick Bennett, conservative activist and director of the Maine Equal Rights Center (unenrolled as a Republican, see Campaign section)

==== Declined ====
- Mike Turcotte, adjunct professor at Eastern Maine Community College

== General election ==
=== Background ===
Heading into the 2014 cycle, only 12 U.S. Senate elections had involved two major party female nominees in U.S. history.

=== Candidates ===
- Shenna Bellows (Democratic), former executive director of the Maine ACLU
- Susan Collins (Republican), incumbent U.S. senator

=== Endorsements ===
Susan Collins (R)

Politicians

- Angus King, U.S. senator (I-ME)
- Joe Manchin, U.S. senator (D-WV)
- Rand Paul, U.S. senator (R-KY)

Unions

- Bath Marine Draftsman's Association
- Independent Guards Association
- International Association of Machinists Local S6 and S7
- Union of Painters & Allied Trades District Council 35

Organizations

- Americans for Responsible Solutions
- Human Rights Campaign

Newspapers

- Bangor Daily News
Shenna Bellows (D)

Politicians and other individuals

- Justin Alfond, president of the Maine Senate
- Tom Andrews, former U.S. representative (D-ME)
- Michael Douglas, actor
- Barney Frank, former U.S. representative (D-MA)
- Tess Gerritsen, author
- Stephen King, author
- Mike Michaud. U.S. representative (D-ME), candidate for governor
- Bob Monks, shareholder activist
- Chellie Pingree, U.S. representative (D-ME)
- Donald Sussman, philanthropist and financier, husband of Rep. Pingree

Unions

- American Postal Worker Union
- International Brotherhood of Electrical Workers
- Iron Workers Local 7
- LIUNA Local 327
- Maine AFL-CIO
- Maine State Building and Construction Trades Council
- Maine State Nurses Association
- Teamsters Local 340
- United Association of Plumbers and Pipefitters Local 716
- United Steelworkers Local 449

Organizations

- Alliance for Retired Americans
- Council for a Livable World
- Democracy for America
- Democratic Senatorial Campaign Committee
- EMILY's list
- Feminist Majority
- Freethought Equality Fund PAC
- Maine People's Alliance
- Marijuana Policy Project
- MoveOn
- National Organization for the Reform of Marijuana Laws
- National Organization for Women
- People for the American Way
- Progressive Change Campaign Committee
- Students for a New American Politics
Declined to endorse

Publications

- MaineToday Media newspapers

Organizations

- Sportsman's Alliance of Maine

=== Predictions ===
Source	Ranking	As of
The Cook Political Report	Solid R	November 3, 2014
Sabato's Crystal Ball	Safe R	November 3, 2014
Rothenberg Political Report	Safe R	November 3, 2014
Real Clear Politics	Safe R	November 3, 2014

=== Polling ===
Poll source	Date(s) administered	Sample size	Margin of error	Susan Collins (R)	Shenna Bellows (D)	Other	Undecided
Public Policy Polling	November 8–11, 2013	964	± 3.2%	59%	20%	—	22%
Rasmussen Reports	April 23–25, 2014	830	± 3%	60%	24%	6%	9%
University of New Hampshire	June 12–18, 2014	527	± 4.3%	72%	17%	—	10%
CBS News/NYT/YouGov	July 5–24, 2014	1,356	± 2.7%	63%	28%	2%	6%
Public Policy Polling*	August 16–18, 2014	679	± 3.8%	57%	33%	—	10%
CBS News/NYT/YouGov	August 18 – September 2, 2014	1,202	± 4%	58%	26%	3%	12%
Rasmussen Reports	September 3–4, 2014	750	± 4%	59%	31%	2%	7%
University of New Hampshire	September 18–25, 2014	482	± 4.4%	59%	29%	—	11%
CBS News/NYT/YouGov	September 20 – October 1, 2014	1,531	± 3%	57%	33%	1%	9%
Pan Atlantic SMS	September 23–29, 2014	400	± 4.9%	68%	25%	—	7%
Bangor Daily News/Ipsos	October 6–12, 2014	540 LV	± 4.8%	56%	31%	5%	7%
Bangor Daily News/Ipsos	October 6–12, 2014	903 RV	± 3.7%	53%	31%	7%	10%
University of New Hampshire	October 15–21, 2014	667	± 3.8%	65%	30%	—	4%
Pan Atlantic SMS	October 15–21, 2014	400	± 4.9%	67%	27%	—	7%
CBS News/NYT/YouGov	October 16–23, 2014	1,177	± 5%	54%	35%	0%	10%
Bangor Daily News/Ipsos	October 23–29, 2014	488	± 5.1%	64%	32%	2%	3%
Maine People's Resource Center	October 31 – November 2, 2014	906	± 3.25%	57%	37%	—	5%

- * Internal poll for Shenna Bellows campaign
Hypothetical polling

With Collins

Poll source	Date(s) administered	Sample size	Margin of error	Susan Collins (R)	Eliot Cutler (I)	Undecided
Public Policy Polling	August 23–25, 2013	953	± 3.2%	53%	33%	14%
Maine People's Resource Center	September 8–10, 2013	652	± 3.84%	58%	28%	14%

Poll source	Date(s) administered	Sample size	Margin of error	Susan Collins (R)	Stephen King (D)	Undecided
Public Policy Polling	August 23–25, 2013	953	± 3.2%	54%	31%	15%

Poll source	Date(s) administered	Sample size	Margin of error	Susan Collins (R)	Mike Michaud (D)	Undecided
Public Policy Polling	January 18–20, 2013	1,268	± 2.8%	54%	36%	10%

Poll source	Date(s) administered	Sample size	Margin of error	Susan Collins (R)	Chellie Pingree (D)	Undecided
Public Policy Polling	January 18–20, 2013	1,268	± 2.8%	58%	33%	9%
Public Policy Polling	August 23–25, 2013	953	± 3.2%	57%	34%	9%

Poll source	Date(s) administered	Sample size	Margin of error	Susan Collins (R)	Generic Democrat	Undecided
Maine People's Resource Center	September 8–10, 2013	652	± 3.84%	60%	26%	15%

With Poliquin

Poll source	Date(s) administered	Sample size	Margin of error	Bruce Poliquin (R)	Chellie Pingree (D)	Undecided
Public Policy Polling	August 23–25, 2013	953	± 3.2%	33%	47%	20%

With Summers

Poll source	Date(s) administered	Sample size	Margin of error	Charlie Summers (R)	Mike Michaud (D)	Undecided
Public Policy Polling	January 18–20, 2013	1,268	± 2.8%	32%	57%	12%

Poll source	Date(s) administered	Sample size	Margin of error	Charlie Summers (R)	Chellie Pingree (D)	Undecided
Public Policy Polling	January 18–20, 2013	1,268	± 2.8%	39%	50%	11%

=== Results ===

The election was not close, with Collins winning all 16 of Maine's counties, and the election overall by a margin of 223,251 votes. This was Collins's largest margin of victory of all of her Senate runs.

2014 United States Senate election in Maine
Party	Candidate	Votes	%	±%
Republican	Susan Collins (incumbent)	413,495	68.46%	+7.13%
Democratic	Shenna Bellows	190,244	31.50%	−7.08%
Write-in		269	0.04%	-0.05%
Total votes		604,008	100.00%	N/A
Republican hold				

==== Results by county ====
County	Susan Collins Republican		Shenna Bellows Democratic		Various candidates Other parties		Margin		Total votes cast
County	#	%	#	%	#	%	#	%	Total votes cast
Androscoggin	32,649	72.0%	12,680	28.0%	15	0.01%	19,969	44.0%	45,344
Aroostook	22,182	78.1%	6,217	21.9%	20	0.1%	15,965	56.2%	28,419
Cumberland	86,495	62.0%	53,036	38.0%	35	0.01%	33,459	24.0%	139,566
Franklin	9,847	70.0%	4,215	29.9%	15	0.1%	5,632	40.1%	14,077
Hancock	16,411	63.0%	9,618	36.9%	8	0.1%	6,793	26.1%	26,037
Kennebec	38,752	69.1%	17,280	30.8%	13	0.1%	21,472	38.3%	56,045
Knox	11,622	62.3%	7,006	37.5%	37	0.2%	4,616	24.8%	18,665
Lincoln	12,321	68.5%	5,646	31.4%	16	0.1%	6,675	37.1%	17,983
Oxford	18,545	71.1%	7,511	28.8%	12	0.1%	11,034	42.3%	26,068
Penobscot	46,617	73.7%	16,623	26.3%	28	0.01%	29,994	46.4%	63,268
Piscataquis	6,174	76.8%	1,862	23.2%	6	0.01%	4,312	53.6%	8,042
Sagadahoc	12,715	69.1%	5,666	30.8%	13	0.1%	7,049	38.3%	18,394
Somerset	15,820	72.2%	6,068	27.7%	11	0.1%	9,752	44.5%	21,899
Waldo	11,816	64.9%	6,379	35.0%	7	0.1%	5,437	29.9%	18,202
Washington	9,801	71.1%	3,978	28.9%	7	0.01%	5,823	42.2%	13,786
York	61,313	70.2%	26,045	29.8%	24	0.01%	35,268	50.4%	87,382
Totals	413,505	68.5%	190,254	31.5%	269	0.01%	223,251	37.0%	604,028

==== By congressional district ====
Collins won both of the congressional districts in the state, including one which also elected a Democrat.

District	Collins	Bellows	Representative
1st	66%	34%	Chellie Pingree
2nd	72%	28%	Mike Michaud (113th Congress)
2nd	72%	28%	Bruce Poliquin (114th Congress)

== See also ==
- 2014 United States Senate elections
- 2014 United States elections
- 2014 United States House of Representatives elections in Maine
- 2014 Maine gubernatorial election
