= 2012 United States House of Representatives elections in Maine =

- November 6, 2012

All 2 Maine seats to the United States House of Representatives
	Majority party	Minority party
Party	Democratic	Republican
Last election	2	0
Seats won	2	0
Seat change	Steady	Steady
Popular vote	427,819	265,982
Percentage	61.66%	38.34%
Swing	▲5.64pp	▼5.63pp

Democratic
50–60%
60–70%
Republican
60–70%

The 2012 United States House of Representatives elections in Maine were held on Tuesday, November 6, 2012, to elect the two U.S. representatives from the state of Maine, one from each of the state's two congressional districts. The elections coincided with the elections of other federal and state offices, including a quadrennial presidential election and an election to the U.S. Senate. Democrats would not win both of Maine's congressional districts again until 2018.

== Overview ==
United States House of Representatives elections in Maine, 2012
Party	Votes	Percentage	Seats before	Seats after	+/–
Democratic	427,819	61.66%	2	2	-
Republican	265,982	38.34%	0	0	-
Totals	693,801	100%	2	2	-

== Redistricting ==
Unlike most states, which had passed redistricting laws to redraw the boundaries of their congressional districts based on the 2010 United States census in advance of the 2012 elections, Maine law required that redistricting be done in 2013. In March 2011, a lawsuit was filed asking a U.S. district judge to ensure redistricting is completed in time for the 2012 elections. According to the Census, the 1st district had a population of 8,669 greater than that of the 2nd district. The Maine Democratic Party, which opposes the lawsuit, was granted intervenor status, and argued that the lawsuit constituted an attempt by the Maine Republican Party to force Representatives Chellie Pingree and Mike Michaud, both of whom are Democrats, to run in the same district. On June 9, 2011, a panel of three federal judges agreed that failing to redistrict would be unconstitutional, and that the state should redraw the boundaries of its districts immediately.

Governor Paul LePage called a special session of the Maine Legislature on September 27 to consider a redistricting plan. On August 15, both Republicans and Democrats released redistricting proposals. The Republican plan would move Lincoln County, Knox County (including Pingree's hometown of North Haven) and Sagadahoc County from the 1st district to the 2nd, and move Oxford County and Androscoggin County from the 2nd district to the 1st, thereby making the 2nd district more favorable to Republicans. The Democratic plan, meanwhile, would not significantly change the current districts: only Vassalboro would be moved from the 1st district to the 2nd.

== District 1 ==
2012 Maine's 1st congressional district election
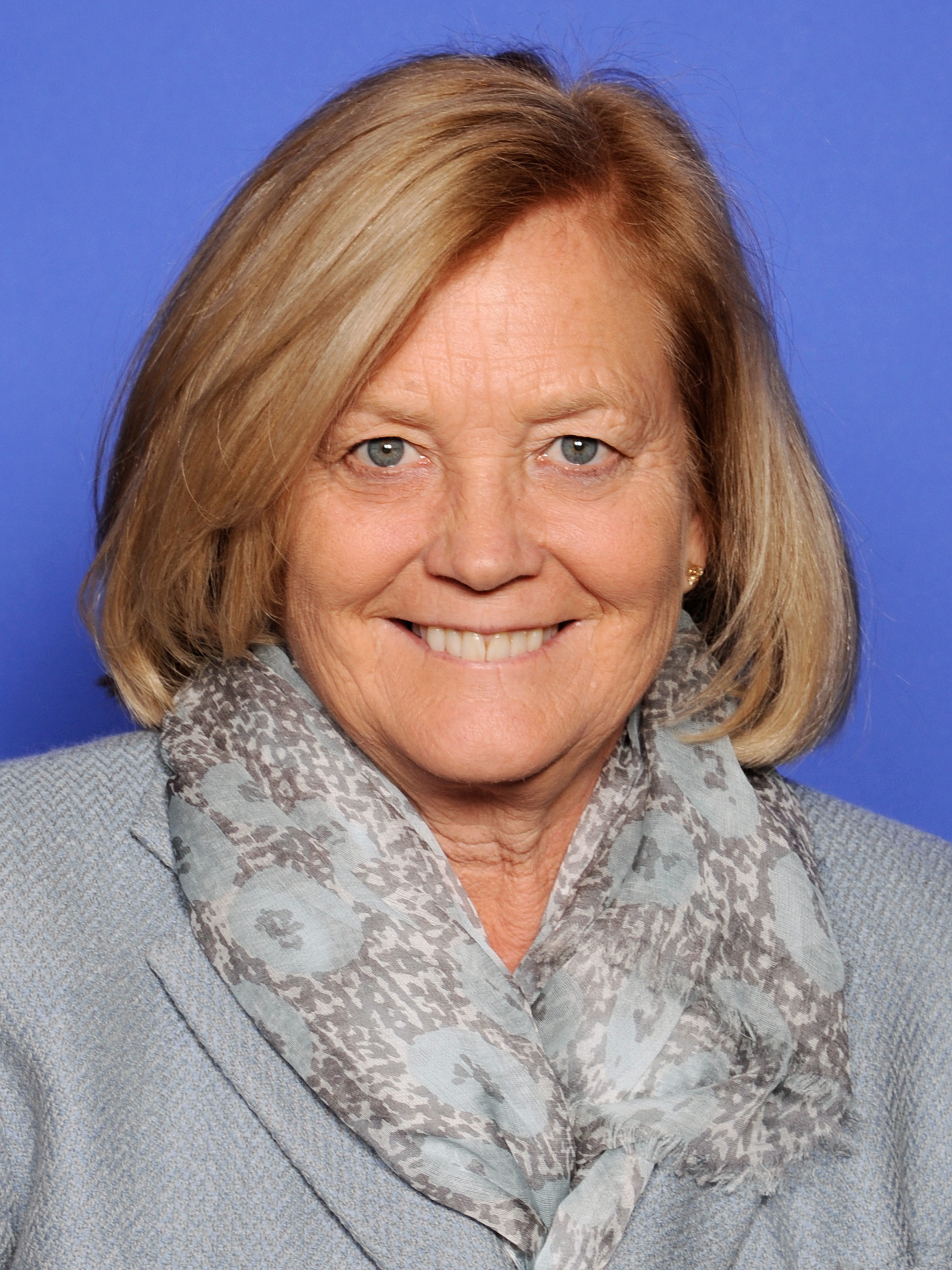

Nominee	Chellie Pingree	Jonathan Courtney
Party	Democratic	Republican
Popular vote	236,363	128,440
Percentage	64.8%	35.2%
- County results Pingree: 60–70%
U.S. Representative before election
Chellie Pingree
Democratic
Elected U.S. Representative
Chellie Pingree
Democratic

Democrat Chellie Pingree, who had represented Maine's 1st congressional district since 2009, was gathering signatures to run for the U.S. Senate, but she decided not to run. State senator Cynthia Dill and state representative Jon Hinck picked up petitions to run for the Democratic nomination in the 1st district. However, after Pingree announced that she would run for reelection, Dill and Hinck chose to campaign for U.S. Senate. Dill would go on to lose the general election to independent Angus King.

=== Democratic primary ===
==== Candidates ====
===== Nominee =====
- Chellie Pingree, incumbent U.S. Representative

===== Withdrawn =====
- Cynthia Dill, state senator
- Jon Hinck, state representative

==== Primary results ====
Democratic primary results
Party	Candidate	Votes	%
Democratic	Chellie Pingree (incumbent)	31,965	100.0
Total votes		31,965	100.0

=== Republican primary ===
==== Candidates ====
===== Nominee =====
- Jon Courtney, State Senate majority leader

===== Eliminated in primary =====
- Patrick Calder, merchant marine

===== Declined =====
- Markham Gartley, former Secretary of State of Maine
- Shawn Moody, independent candidate for Governor in 2010
- Richard Snow, businessman

==== Primary results ====
Republican primary results
Party	Candidate	Votes	%
Republican	Jonathan Courtney	14,558	50.4
Republican	Patrick Calder	14,330	49.6
Total votes		28,888	100.0

=== Independents ===
==== Declined ====
- Shawn Moody, independent candidate for Governor in 2010

=== General election ===
==== Polling ====
Poll source	Date(s) administered	Sample size	Margin of error	Chellie Pingree (D)	Jon Courtney (R)	Undecided
MPRC/Maine People's Alliance (D)	November 1–3, 2012	469	± 3.3%	62%	34%	4%
Pan Atlantic SMS Group	September 24–28, 2012	198	± 7.0%	57%	24%	19%
MPRC/Maine People's Alliance (D)	September 15–17, 2012	444	± 4.3%	60%	32%	8%
Critical Insights (Portland Press Herald)	June 20–25, 2012	615	± 4.0%	57%	31%	12%
Maine People's Resource Center (D)	March 31–April 2, 2012	522	± 4.3%	61%	28%	11%

==== Predictions ====
Source	Ranking	As of
The Cook Political Report	Safe D	November 5, 2012
Rothenberg	Safe D	November 2, 2012
Roll Call	Safe D	November 4, 2012
Sabato's Crystal Ball	Safe D	November 5, 2012
NY Times	Safe D	November 4, 2012
RCP	Safe D	November 4, 2012
The Hill	Safe D	November 4, 2012

==== Results ====
Maine's 1st congressional district, 2012
Party	Candidate	Votes	%
Democratic	Chellie Pingree (incumbent)	236,363	64.8
Republican	Jonathan Courtney	128,440	35.2
Total votes		364,803	100.0
Democratic hold			

== District 2 ==
2012 Maine's 2nd congressional district election
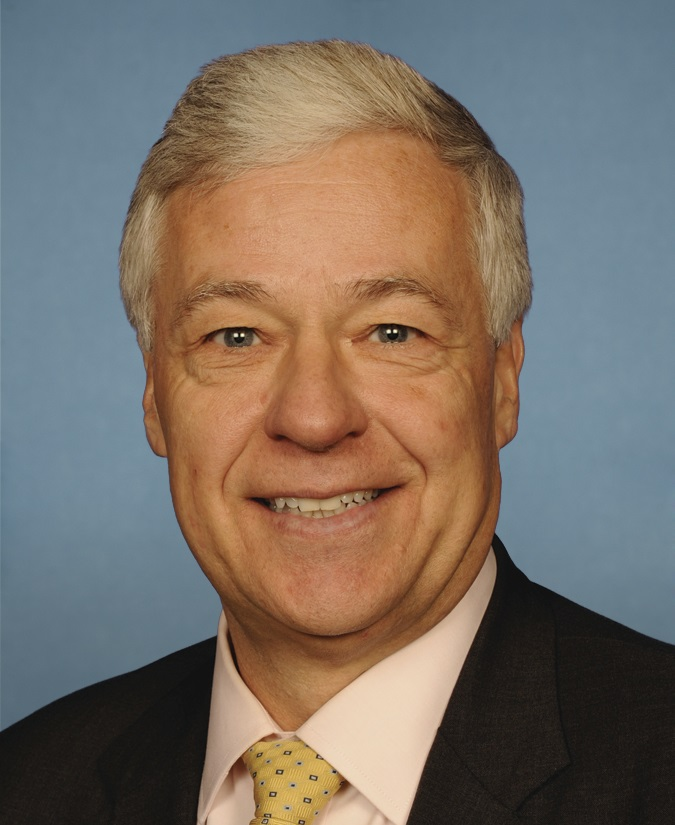

Nominee	Mike Michaud	Kevin Raye
Party	Democratic	Republican
Popular vote	191,456	137,542
Percentage	58.2%	41.8%
- County results Michaud: 50%–60% 60–70% 70–80% Raye: 60–70%
U.S. Representative before election
Mike Michaud
Democratic
Elected U.S. Representative
Mike Michaud
Democratic

Democrat Mike Michaud, who had represented Maine's 2nd congressional district since 2003, decided not to run for the U.S. Senate, and was running for a sixth term in the United States House of Representatives. David Costa, a concierge at the Portland Harbor Hotel; Wellington Lyons, a lawyer; and David Lemoine, a former state treasurer, had taken out papers to seek the Democratic nomination to succeed Michaud had he run for Senate. Emily Cain, the minority leader of the Maine House of Representatives, had also planned to seek the Democratic nomination in the 2nd district if Michaud decided to run for the Senate seat.

=== Democratic primary ===
==== Candidates ====
===== Nominee =====
- Mike Michaud, incumbent U.S. Representative

===== Declined =====
- Emily Cain, minority leader of the Maine House of Representatives
- David Costa, concierge at the Portland Harbor Hotel
- David Lemoine, former State Treasurer
- Wellington Lyons, lawyer

==== Results ====
Democratic primary results
Party	Candidate	Votes	%
Democratic	Mike Michaud (incumbent)	21,895	100.0
Total votes		21,895	100.0

=== Republican primary ===
==== Candidates ====
===== Nominee =====
- Kevin Raye, Maine Senate president

===== Eliminated in primary =====
- Blaine Richardson, retired naval veteran

===== Declined =====
- Jason Levesque, businessman and nominee for this seat in 2010

==== Primary results ====
Republican primary results
Party	Candidate	Votes	%
Republican	Kevin Raye	18,703	60.0
Republican	Blaine R. Richardson	12,465	40.0
Total votes		31,168	100.0

=== General election ===
==== Endorsements ====
Mike Michaud (D)

Organizations

- Blue Dog Coalition
Kevin Raye (R)

Organizations

- National Republican Congressional Committee "Young Guns" Program

==== Polling ====
Poll source	Date(s) administered	Sample size	Margin of error	Mike Michaud (D)	Kevin Raye (R)	Undecided
MPRC/Maine People's Alliance (D)	November 1–3, 2012	469	± 3.3%	50%	46%	4%
Eaton River Strategies/Scientific Marketing & Analysis (R-Raye)	October 10–11, 2012	1,200	± 2.8%	47%	40%	13%
Normington, Petts & Associates (D-Michaud)	October 8–9, 2012	400	± 4.9%	58%	33%	9%
Pan Atlantic SMS Group	September 24–28, 2012	202	± 6.9%	52%	32%	16%
MPRC/Maine People's Alliance (D)	September 15–17, 2012	410	± 4.3%	56%	37%	7%
Normington, Petts & Associates (D-Michaud)	June 25–27, 2012	400	± 4.9%	62%	30%	8%
Critical Insights (Portland Press Herald)	June 20–25, 2012	615	± 4.0%	47%	35%	18%
Maine People's Resource Center (D)	March 31–April 2, 2012	471	± 4.5%	53%	37%	10%
Normington, Petts & Associates (D-Michaud)	January 23–25, 2012	400	± 4.9%	55%	32%	13%

==== Predictions ====
Source	Ranking	As of
The Cook Political Report	Safe D	November 5, 2012
Rothenberg	Safe D	November 2, 2012
Roll Call	Safe D	November 4, 2012
Sabato's Crystal Ball	Safe D	November 5, 2012
NY Times	Safe D	November 4, 2012
RCP	Lean D	November 4, 2012
The Hill	Likely D	November 4, 2012

==== Results ====
Maine's 2nd congressional district, 2012
Party	Candidate	Votes	%
Democratic	Mike Michaud (incumbent)	191,456	58.2
Republican	Kevin Raye	137,542	41.8
Total votes		328,998	100.0
Democratic hold			
