= 2012 United States Senate election in Maine =

- November 6, 2012
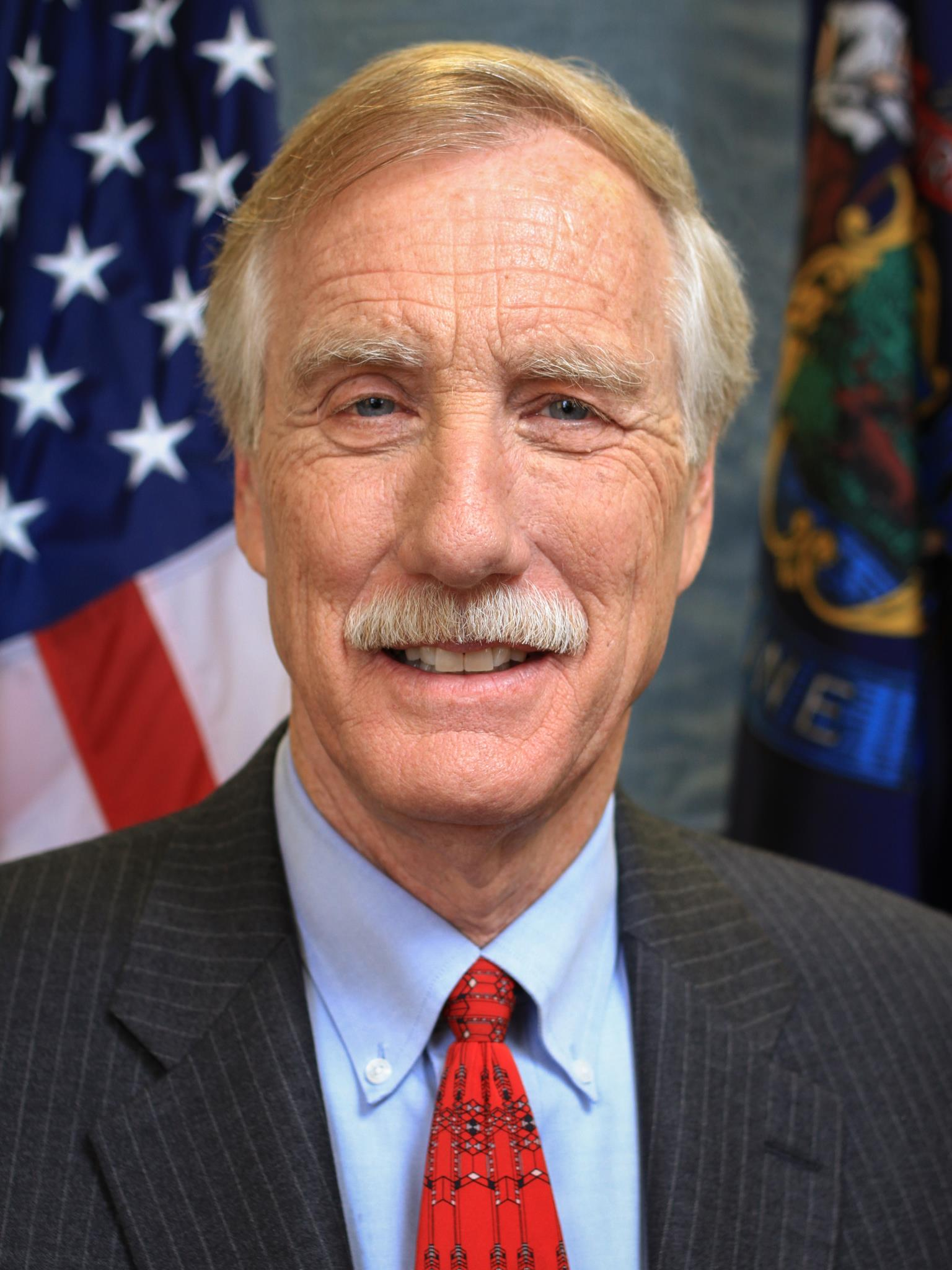

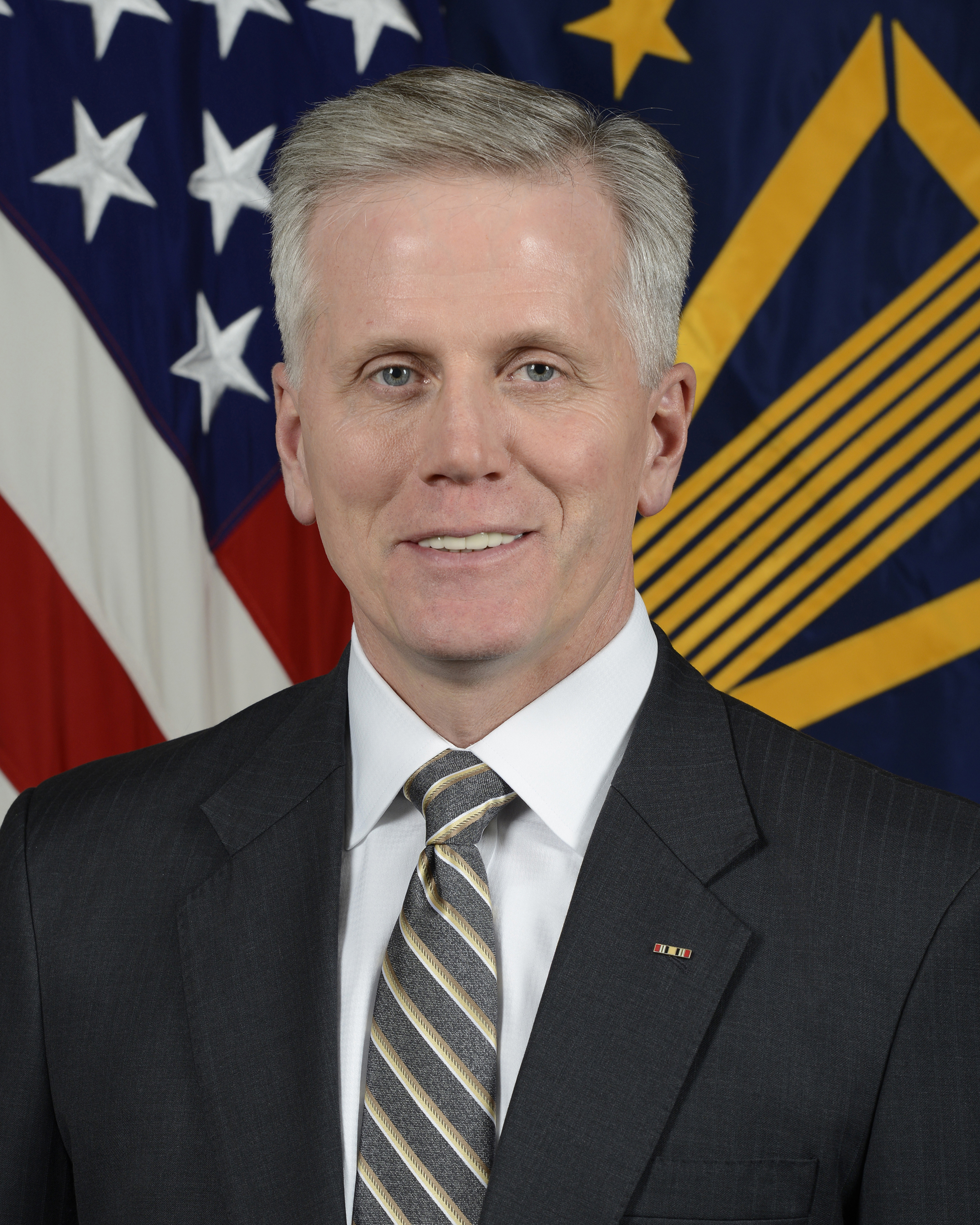

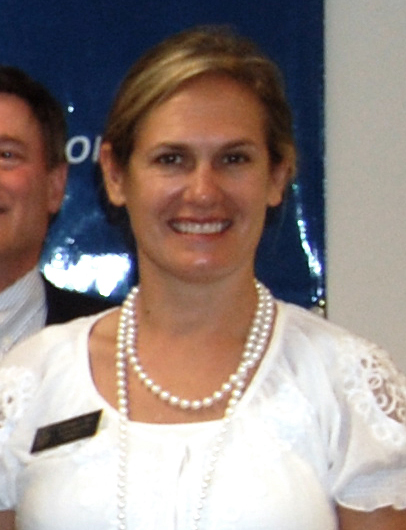
Nominee	Angus King	Charlie Summers	Cynthia Dill
Party	Independent	Republican	Democratic
Popular vote	370,580	215,399	92,900
Percentage	52.89%	30.75%	13.26%
- King: 30–40% 40–50% 50–60% 60–70% 70–80% >90% Summers: 30–40% 40–50% 50–60% 60–70% >90% Dill: 40–50% 60–70% >90% Tie: 30–40% 40–50% 50–60%
U.S. senator before election
Olympia Snowe
Republican
Elected U.S. Senator
Angus King
Independent

The 2012 United States Senate election in Maine was held on November 6, 2012, alongside a presidential election, other elections to the United States Senate in other states, elections to the United States House of Representatives, and various state and local elections. Despite initially declaring her candidacy and being considered the favorite, popular incumbent Republican U.S. Senator Olympia Snowe unexpectedly decided to retire instead of running for reelection to a fourth term.

Independent former governor Angus King won the open seat with 52.9% of the vote against Republican Charlie Summers and Democrat Cynthia Dill, carrying all 16 of Maine's counties. Following independent Connecticut Senator Joe Lieberman's retirement from the Senate in 2013, King became the second independent incumbent U.S. senator, after Vermont's Bernie Sanders. This was the first U.S. Senate race in Maine since 1988 that was not won by a Republican. This was also the first Senate election in the state since 1854 not won by a Democrat or Republican.

After being elected, King met with Democratic Leader Harry Reid and Republican Leader Mitch McConnell. He then decided to caucus with the Democratic Party. This effectively gave the Democrats a 55–45 Senate majority, due to Sanders caucusing with the Democrats as well.

== Background ==
Incumbent Olympia Snowe won re-election to a third term in 2006 with 74.01% of the vote over Democrat Jean Hay Bright and independent Bill Slavick. Due to the unpopularity of some of Snowe's votes among conservative voters, namely for the American Recovery and Reinvestment Act of 2009 and initial support of the Patient Protection and Affordable Care Act, there was speculation that she would face competition in the 2012 Republican primary from more conservative challengers. The Tea Party Express had promised to aid in a primary against Snowe. There had also been speculation that Snowe would switch parties, though she has always denied this. By June 2011, Snowe had officially entered her name with signatures to run in the Republican primary, saying, she "would never switch parties".

However, on February 28, 2012, Snowe announced that she would be retiring from the U.S. Senate at the end of her term, citing the "atmosphere of polarization and 'my way or the highway' ideologies... pervasive in campaigns and in our governing institutions" as the reason for her retirement. Her announcement opened the door for candidates from all parties, creating a much more contested 2012 election.

The primary election was held on June 12.

== Republican primary ==
=== Candidates ===
==== On ballot ====
- Rick Bennett, former president of the Maine Senate
- Scott D'Amboise, former Lisbon Falls selectman
- Debra Plowman, state senator
- Bruce Poliquin, Maine state treasurer
- William Schneider, Maine attorney general
- Charlie Summers, Maine secretary of state

==== Withdrew ====
- Andrew Ian Dodge, conservative activist (ran as an independent)
- Olympia Snowe, incumbent U.S. senator

==== Declined ====
- Steve Abbott, athletic director at the University of Maine and candidate for governor in 2010
- Peter Cianchette, former U.S. ambassador to Costa Rica and nominee for governor in 2002
- William Cohen, former United States secretary of defense (1997–2001) and former U.S. senator (1979–1997)
- Peter Mills, executive director of the Maine Turnpike Authority, former state senator and candidate for governor of Maine in 2002 and 2006
- Kevin Raye, president of the Maine Senate (ran for U.S. House)

==== Polling ====
Poll source	Date(s) administered	Sample size	Margin of error	Rick Bennett	Scott D'Amboise	Debra Plowman	Bruce Poliquin	William Schneider	Charlie Summers	Other	Undecided
MPRC	March 31 – April 2, 2012	318	±5.49%	7%	4%	6%	12%	4%	28%	—	40%

Hypothetical polling

Republican primary

Poll source	Date(s) administered	Sample size	Margin of error	Scott D'Amboise	Andrew Dodge	Olympia Snowe	Other	Undecided
Public Policy Polling	March 3–6, 2011	434	±4.7%	18%	10%	43%	—	28%
Public Policy Polling	October 28–31, 2011	250	±6.2%	10%	7%	62%	—	20%

Poll source	Date(s) administered	Sample size	Margin of error	Olympia Snowe	Someone more conservative	Other	Undecided
Public Policy Polling	September 2–6, 2010	584	±4.1%	29%	63%	—	8%
Public Policy Polling	March 3–6, 2011	434	±4.7%	33%	58%	—	9%
Public Policy Polling	October 28–31, 2011	250	±6.2%	46%	47%	—	6%

Poll source	Date(s) administered	Sample size	Margin of error	Olympia Snowe	Chandler Woodcock	Other	Undecided
Public Policy Polling	September 2–6, 2010	584	±4.1%	33%	38%	—	29%

=== Results ===
Results by county: Summers: 30–40%; 40–50%; Poliquin: 30–40%%; Bennett: 50–60%; Plowman: 20–30%

Republican primary results
Party	Candidate	Votes	%
Republican	Charlie Summers	20,578	29.46
Republican	Bruce Poliquin	15,973	22.86
Republican	Rick Bennett	12,544	17.96
Republican	Scott D'Amboise	7,735	11.07
Republican	William Schneider	6,784	9.71
Republican	Deborah Plowman	6,244	8.94
Total votes		69,098	100.00

== Democratic primary ==
On February 29, 2012, the day after Snowe announced her retirement, U.S. Representative for Maine's 1st congressional district Chellie Pingree announced that she would circulate petitions to qualify for the ballot to run for Senate. After Angus King entered the race on March 7, Pingree chose instead to run for re-election.

=== Candidates ===
==== On the ballot ====
- Cynthia Dill, state senator
- Matthew Dunlap, former Maine secretary of state
- Jon Hinck, state representative
- Benjamin Pollard, homebuilder

==== Declined ====
- John Baldacci, former governor of Maine and former U.S. representative from Maine's 2nd congressional district
- Emily Cain, minority leader of the Maine House of Representatives
- Mike Michaud, U.S. representative from Maine's 2nd congressional district (ran for re-election)
- Chellie Pingree, U.S. representative from Maine's 1st congressional district and nominee for the U.S. Senate in 2002 (ran for re-election)

==== Polling ====
Poll source	Date(s) administered	Sample size	Margin of error	Cynthia Dill	Matthew Dunlap	Jon Hinck	Benjamin Pollard	Other	Undecided
Maine People's Resource Center	March 31 – April 2, 2012	415	±4.8%	20%	17%	6%	2%	—	55%

=== Results ===
Results by county Dill: 40–50%; 50–60%; Dunlap: 40–50%; 50–60%; 60–70%

Democratic primary results
Party	Candidate	Votes	%
Democratic	Cynthia Dill	22,629	44.31
Democratic	Matt Dunlap	18,202	35.64
Democratic	Jon Hinck	6,302	12.34
Democratic	Benjamin Pollard	3,945	7.72
Total votes		51,078	100.00

== General election ==
=== Candidates ===
- Danny Dalton (Non-Party), former federal employee and small business owner
- Cynthia Dill (Democratic), state senator and former state representative
- Andrew Ian Dodge (independent), conservative activist affiliated with the Libertarian Party of Maine
- Angus King (independent), former governor of Maine
- Benjamin Pollard (write-in), homebuilder (lost Democratic primary)
- Charlie Summers (Republican), secretary of state of Maine and former state senator
- Steve Woods (independent), chairman of Yarmouth Town Council and CEO of TideSmart Global

=== Debates ===
2012 United States Senate election in Maine debates
No.	Date	Host	Moderator	Link	Independent	Democratic	Independent	Independent	Republican	Independent
Key: P Participant A Absent N Not invited I Invited W Withdrawn										
Key: P Participant A Absent N Not invited I Invited W Withdrawn					Danny Dalton	Cynthia Dill	Andrew Ian Dodge	Angus King	Charlie Summers	Steve Woods
1	Nov. 1, 2012	Maine Public		C-SPAN	P	P	P	P	P	P
2	Nov. 2, 2012	WMTW-TV	Shannon Moss	C-SPAN	P	P	P	P	P	P

=== Campaign ===
The group Maine People's Alliance called on Charles Summers to resign his position as secretary of state of Maine, stating that it was a conflict of interest for the secretary of state to oversee their own election to another office. They also had concerns over past actions in sending letters to college students about voter registration requirements. A spokesperson for Summers said that he had turned over all election oversight to a deputy secretary of state, and Summers himself stated that he was not going to resign. No secretary of state or Maine attorney general seeking higher office in the last 30 years has resigned.

Steve Woods announced on August 1 that, if elected, he would donate his entire Senate salary to Maine charities chosen by an independent committee of business and nonprofit leaders he would appoint. He encouraged Angus King to make a similar pledge; King responded through his spokesperson that he and his wife would continue to donate money to charities, and that all candidates should do so in "the best way they feel they can."

==== Anti-spoiler proposal ====
Steve Woods met with Angus King on June 13 to discuss a proposal by Woods for either man to leave the race if it appeared one or the other was not going to win, in order to avoid being a spoiler candidate. Woods specifically cited the 2010 Maine Gubernatorial election as well as the 2000 presidential election as examples of what could result from a fragmented electorate. King stated that while he had not fully considered Woods' proposal, he didn't think he was a spoiler, in that "If I thought that, I wouldn't be running." Woods said that regardless of whether or not King accepted the proposal, he likely would abide by it and endorse King in late October if it appeared he would not win. Woods did indeed drop out and endorsed King on November 4, stating that King had the "highest degree of integrity to represent all Mainers". Woods' name, however, remained on the ballot.

==== Campaign spending issues ====
On June 13, Angus King held a press conference and stated that he would discourage campaign spending by outside groups if his opponents would agree to do the same. King criticized such spending as "a tidal wave of anonymous campaign expenditures that distort our political process." His proposed agreement was modeled on a similar agreement between Massachusetts Senator Scott Brown and his opponent Elizabeth Warren, which required them, if outside money is spent on their behalf, to donate an equivalent amount of money to the charity of their opponent's choice. Democrat Cynthia Dill criticized the proposal as lacking "detail or substance" but added that she "looked forward to seeing a proposed agreement." Republican Charles Summers did not state whether he would accept King's proposal or not but criticized King for discussing campaign finance instead of issues like the economy and government spending. Andrew Ian Dodge called such an agreement "unworkable", while Steve Woods said he would abide by such an agreement.

In a letter to King, Dill again stated that she was open to an agreement on limiting outside spending in the race, but she also called on King to support measures the candidates can take themselves to limit campaign spending. These include pledging to not finance their campaigns themselves and limiting contributions to $500. Dill also called on King to take stands on a variety of campaign finance legislation, such as the DISCLOSE Act. King told the Bangor Daily News the prior week that he does support increased disclosure requirements for super-PACs, but did not specifically say he supports the DISCLOSE Act. King is so far the only candidate to benefit from super-PAC money, as a group called icPurple Inc. spent $24,000 making an online advertisement for King. King stated that as part of his proposal, he would ask the group to take the ads down.

Danny Dalton stated on June 14 that he would not accept any campaign donations whatsoever, in order to assure constituents that he will represent everyone equally.

Steve Woods pledged to not spend more than $1.3 million on his campaign, or roughly $1 per Maine resident, including campaign donations and his own money. He stated, "If I can't get my message out and if the public isn't interested in that message, to spend more would be egregious."

On July 18, King was criticized for attending a fundraiser in Washington, D.C., where he raised money from PACs and other donors. Republicans said King's actions were "the height of hypocrisy" for speaking out against PAC money and raising it at the same time, while Cynthia Dill criticized King as an "insider who is working the system". King defended his actions by stating that he "took no joy" in them but that it was necessary for him to raise money to defend himself in the "dogfight" he expects. King also reiterated his support of changing campaign finance laws and said that he was making no promises to donors.

=== Endorsements ===
Cynthia Dill

Individuals

- John Baldacci, former governor of Maine

Organizations

- Democratic Advancement PAC
- Maine State Employees Association SEIU Local 1989
- National Women's Political Caucus
- Women's Action for New Directions
Angus King

Individuals

- Joe Baldacci, former mayor of Bangor (Democratic)
- Erskine Bowles, former White House chief of staff, co-chair of Simpson-Bowles Commission (Democratic)
- Yellow Light Breen, executive vice president of Bangor Savings Bank
- David Cole, former commissioner of the Maine Department of Transportation
- Michael Crowley, treasurer and board member of Eastern Maine Development Corporation, former city councilor and mayor/council chair of Bangor, former president of Bangor Region Chamber of Commerce
- Bill Richardson, former governor of New Mexico, former U.S. ambassador to the United Nations (Democratic)
- John Rohman, former mayor of Bangor
- Elizabeth Schneider, Maine state senator (D-Penobscot)
- Alan Simpson, former U.S. senator from Wyoming (Republican), co-chair of Simpson-Bowles Commission
- Jesse Ventura, former governor of Minnesota (Reform)
- Lowell P. Weicker Jr., former governor of Connecticut and former U.S. senator (R-CT)
- Mark Woodward, chairman of the Bangor Region Chamber of Commerce and former executive editor of the Bangor Daily News

Organizations

- American Nurses Association
- Citizens for Global Solutions
- Council for a Livable World
- Human Rights Campaign
- International Union of Operating Engineers Local 4
- International Union of Painters and Allied Trades District Council #35
- League of Conservation Voters
- Maine Credit Union League
- Maine Education Association
- Maine Renewable Energy Association
- Maine State Building and Construction Trades Council
- Massachusetts and Northern New England Laborers' District Council
- National Education Association
- National Farmers Union
- National Wildlife Federation
- New England Regional Council of Carpenters
- Ocean Champions
- Professional Fire Fighters of Maine
- Sierra Club

Publications

- Bangor Daily News
- The Maine Campus
- Seacoastonline.com
- Sun Journal
Charlie Summers

Individuals

- George H. W. Bush, former president of the United States
- Susan Collins, U.S. senator (R-ME)
- Olympia Snowe, U.S. senator (R-ME)

Organizations

- Maine Associated Builders and Contractors
- Maine Restaurant Association
- National Defense PAC
- National Federation of Independent Business
- National Rifle Association of America
- United States Chamber of Commerce
Andrew Ian Dodge

Individuals

- Gary Johnson, former governor of New Mexico and Libertarian Party nominee for president in 2012

Organizations

- Libertarian Party of Maine

=== Fundraising ===
Candidate (party)	Receipts	Disbursements	Cash on hand	Debt
Angus King (I)	$937,694	$434,250	$503,444	$37,742
Charlie Summers (R)	$294,081	$174,082	$119,289	$55,000
Cynthia Dill (D)	$104,512	$75,988	$28,521	$5,698
Source: Federal Election Commission

=== Top contributors by employer ===
Angus King	Contribution	Charlie Summers	Contribution	Cynthia Dill	Contribution
Lee Auto Mall	$15,000	Alamo PAC	$10,000	Auto Europe	$2,500
Bernstein Shur	$13,300	Kelly PAC	$10,000	Thornton Academy	$2,500
Bowdoin College	$11,500	Making Business Excel PAC	$5,000	Southern Maine Community College	$2,500
Elevation Partners	$10,000	Royal Shell Real Estate	$5,000	Jones Day	$2,000
Lee Auto Mall-Auburn	$10,000	White Rock Distilleries	$5,000	Quimby Foundation	$2,000
International Union of Operating Engineers	$10,000	D&G Machine Products	$3,000	City of Middletown Connecticut	$1,000
Spectrum Health	$8,950	3M Co.	$2,500	Mill to the Hill PAC $1,000	$1,000
Pierce Atwood LLP	$8,500	Doyle Group	$2,500		
Martin's Point Health Care	$8,250	Speedway Motorsports, Inc.	$2,500		
Eaton Peabody	$6,000	Moulison North	$2,500		

=== Top industries ===
Angus King	Contribution	Charlie Summers	Contribution	Cynthia Dill	Contribution
Retired	$117,500	Leadership PACs	$25,000	Lawyers/law firms	$3,850
Lawyers/law firms	$56,600	Misc. business	$23,500	Retired	$2,550
Financial institutions	$37,250	Retired	$12,000	Health professionals	$2,500
Real estate	$26,600	Real estate	$6,000	Non-profit institutions	$2,000
Automotive industry	$25,000	Manufacturing & distributing	$5,500	Women's issues	$1,500
Misc. finance	$24,750	Alcohol industry	$5,000	Civil servants/public officials	$1,250
Education	$20,960	General contractors	$3,000	Leadership PACs	$1,000
Misc. business	$20,750	Business services	$2,750	Misc. business	$500
Health professionals	$19,450	Telecommunications industry	$2,500	Construction industry	$500
Insurance	$16,750	Insurance	$2,500	Food industry	$350

=== Predictions ===
Source	Ranking	As of
The Cook Political Report	Tossup	November 1, 2012
Sabato's Crystal Ball	Likely I (flip)	November 5, 2012
Rothenberg Political Report	Likely I (flip)	November 2, 2012
Real Clear Politics	Likely I (flip)	November 5, 2012

=== Polling ===
Poll source	Date(s) administered	Sample size	Margin of error	Charlie Summers (R)	Cynthia Dill (D)	Angus King (I)	Other	Undecided
WBUR TV/MassInc Polling Group	June 13–14, 2012	506	±4.4%	23%	9%	50%	1%	17%
Portland Press Herald/Critical Insights	June 20–25, 2012	615	±4%	27%	7%	55%	1%	9%
Moore Consulting	August 5–6, 2012	500	±n/a	28%	8%	46%	—	—
Portland Press Herald/Critical Insights	September 12–16, 2012	618	±4%	28%	12%	50%	3%	8%
Maine People's Resource Center	September 15–17, 2012	856	±3.35%	28%	15%	44%	6%	7%
Public Policy Polling	September 17–18, 2012	804	±3.5%	35%	14%	43%	—	8%
Rasmussen Reports	September 25, 2012	500	±4.5%	33%	14%	45%	1%	7%
Pan Atlantic SMS	September 24–28, 2012	400	±4.9%	24%	12%	50%	—	14%
Portland Press Herald/Critical Insights	October 30–31, 2012	613	±4%	33%	11%	49%	—	7%
Public Policy Polling	November 1–2, 2012	1,633	±2.4%	36%	12%	50%	—	2%
Maine People's Resource Center	November 1–3, 2012	905	±3.26%	34%	11%	48%	5%	3%

Hypothetical polling

with Olympia Snowe

Poll source	Date(s) administered	Sample size	Margin of error	Olympia Snowe (R)	Emily Cain (D)	Other	Undecided
Public Policy Polling	March 3–6, 2011	1,246	±2.8%	64%	20%	—	16%

Poll source	Date(s) administered	Sample size	Margin of error	Olympia Snowe (R)	Matt Dunlap (D)	Other	Undecided
Public Policy Polling	October 28–31, 2011	673	±3.8%	64%	22%	—	15%

Poll source	Date(s) administered	Sample size	Margin of error	Olympia Snowe (R)	Jon Hinck (D)	Other	Undecided
Public Policy Polling	October 28–31, 2011	673	±3.8%	65%	18%	—	17%

Poll source	Date(s) administered	Sample size	Margin of error	Olympia Snowe (R)	Mike Michaud (D)	Other	Undecided
Public Policy Polling	October 28–31, 2011	673	±3.8%	54%	37%	—	9%

Poll source	Date(s) administered	Sample size	Margin of error	Olympia Snowe (R)	Chellie Pingree (D)	Other	Undecided
Public Policy Polling	October 28–31, 2011	673	±3.8%	55%	36%	—	9%

Poll source	Date(s) administered	Sample size	Margin of error	Olympia Snowe (R)	Rosa Scarcelli (D)	Other	Undecided
Public Policy Polling	March 3–6, 2011	1,246	±2.8%	66%	18%	—	17%

with John Baldacci

Poll source	Date(s) administered	Sample size	Margin of error	Rick Bennett (R)	John Baldacci (D)	Other	Undecided
Public Policy Polling	March 2–4, 2012	1,256	±2.8%	41%	43%	—	16%

Poll source	Date(s) administered	Sample size	Margin of error	Scott D'Amboise (R)	John Baldacci (D)	Other	Undecided
Public Policy Polling	March 2–4, 2012	1,256	±2.8%	36%	48%	—	16%

Poll source	Date(s) administered	Sample size	Margin of error	Bruce Poliquin (R)	John Baldacci (D)	Other	Undecided
Public Policy Polling	March 2–4, 2012	1,256	±2.8%	35%	50%	—	16%

Poll source	Date(s) administered	Sample size	Margin of error	Bill Schneider (R)	John Baldacci (D)	Other	Undecided
Public Policy Polling	March 2–4, 2012	1,256	±2.8%	36%	47%	—	17%

Poll source	Date(s) administered	Sample size	Margin of error	Charlie Summers (R)	John Baldacci (D)	Other	Undecided
Public Policy Polling	March 2–4, 2012	1,256	±2.8%	39%	48%	—	13%

with Emily Cain

Poll source	Date(s) administered	Sample size	Margin of error	Scott D'Amboise (R)	Emily Cain (D)	Other	Undecided
Public Policy Polling	March 3–6, 2011	1,246	±2.8%	33%	33%	—	34%

Poll source	Date(s) administered	Sample size	Margin of error	Andrew Ian Dodge (R)	Emily Cain (D)	Other	Undecided
Public Policy Polling	March 3–6, 2011	1,246	±2.8%	30%	32%	—	37%

with Matt Dunlap

Poll source	Date(s) administered	Sample size	Margin of error	Scott D'Amboise (R)	Matt Dunlap (D)	Other	Undecided
Public Policy Polling	October 28–31, 2011	673	±3.8%	23%	31%	—	47%

with Rosa Scarcelli

Poll source	Date(s) administered	Sample size	Margin of error	Scott D'Amboise (R)	Rosa Scarcelli (D)	Other	Undecided
Public Policy Polling	March 3–6, 2011	1,246	±2.8%	36%	29%	—	35%

Poll source	Date(s) administered	Sample size	Margin of error	Andrew Ian Dodge (R)	Rosa Scarcelli (D)	Other	Undecided
Public Policy Polling	March 3–6, 2011	1,246	±2.8%	33%	29%	—	38%

with Pingree

Poll source	Date(s) administered	Sample size	Margin of error	Rick Bennett (R)	Chellie Pingree (D)	Other	Undecided
Public Policy Polling	March 2–4, 2012	1,256	±2.8%	39%	52%	—	9%

Poll source	Date(s) administered	Sample size	Margin of error	Scott D'Amboise (R)	Chellie Pingree (D)	Other	Undecided
Public Policy Polling	March 2–4, 2012	1,256	±2.8%	36%	53%	—	12%

Poll source	Date(s) administered	Sample size	Margin of error	Bruce Poliquin (R)	Chellie Pingree (D)	Other	Undecided
Public Policy Polling	March 2–4, 2012	1,256	±2.8%	33%	54%	—	12%

Poll source	Date(s) administered	Sample size	Margin of error	Bill Schneider (R)	Chellie Pingree (D)	Other	Undecided
Public Policy Polling	March 2–4, 2012	1,256	±2.8%	35%	53%	—	12%

Poll source	Date(s) administered	Sample size	Margin of error	Charlie Summers (R)	Chellie Pingree (D)	Other	Undecided
Public Policy Polling	March 2–4, 2012	1,256	±2.8%	37%	53%	—	10%

Three-way matchups

Poll source	Date(s) administered	Sample size	Margin of error	Scott D'Amboise (R)	Emily Cain (D)	Olympia Snowe (I)	Other	Undecided
Public Policy Polling	March 3–6, 2011	1,246	±2.8%	21%	17%	54%	—	7%

Poll source	Date(s) administered	Sample size	Margin of error	Andrew Ian Dodge (R)	Emily Cain (D)	Olympia Snowe (I)	Other	Undecided
Public Policy Polling	March 3–6, 2011	1,246	±2.8%	19%	15%	56%	—	10%

Poll source	Date(s) administered	Sample size	Margin of error	Scott D'Amboise (R)	Rosa Scarcelli (D)	Olympia Snowe (I)	Other	Undecided
Public Policy Polling	March 3–6, 2011	1,246	±2.8%	20%	15%	56%	—	9%

Poll source	Date(s) administered	Sample size	Margin of error	Charlie Summers (R)	Chellie Pingree (D)	Andrew Ian Dodge (I)	Other	Undecided
Public Policy Polling	March 2–4, 2012	1,256	±2.8%	33%	49%	9%	—	8%

Poll source	Date(s) administered	Sample size	Margin of error	Charlie Summers (R)	Chellie Pingree (D)	Angus King (I)	Other	Undecided
Public Policy Polling	March 2–4, 2012	1,256	±2.8%	28%	31%	36%	—	5%

Poll source	Date(s) administered	Sample size	Margin of error	Charlie Summers (R)	Matt Dunlap (D)	Angus King (I)	Other	Undecided
Maine People's Resource Center	March 31 – April 2, 2012	996	±3.11%	22%	12%	56%	—	10%

=== Results ===
County flips: Independent Flip from Republican

King was never in serious danger of defeat, with only one poll finding him leading by less than double digits. He carried all 16 counties in Maine, and finished 22 points ahead of his nearest challenger, Summers. Summers did well in rural northern, western, and eastern Maine, while Dill won only the Passamaquoddy Indian Township Reservation and the Penobscot Indian Island Reservation, both heavily Democratic Indian reservations. A handful of municipalities ended up tied: Hammond, New Limerick, Wesley, and West Forks were btied between King and Summers, while Glenwood Plantation weretied between King and Dill.

United States Senate election in Maine, 2012
Party	Candidate	Votes	%	±%
Independent	Angus King	370,580	52.89%	N/A
Republican	Charlie Summers	215,399	30.75%	−43.26%
Democratic	Cynthia Dill	92,900	13.26%	−7.33%
Independent	Steve Woods (withdrawn)	10,289	1.47%	N/A
Independent	Danny Dalton	5,807	0.83%	N/A
Independent	Andrew Ian Dodge	5,624	0.80%	N/A
Total votes		700,599	100.00%	N/A
Independent gain from Republican				

==== By county ====
County	Angus King Independent		Charlie Summers Republican		Cynthia Dill Democratic		All Others		Margin		Total votes
County	#	%	#	%	#	%	#	%	#	%	Total votes
Androscoggin	27,629	53.1%	15,641	30.1%	6,824	13.1%	1,937	2.7%	11,988	23.0%	52,031
Aroostook	14,897	45.2%	11,547	35.0%	5,263	16.0%	1,249	3.8%	3,350	10.2%	32,956
Cumberland	93,746	58.1%	42,336	26.2%	21,149	13.1%	4,217	2.6%	51,410	31.9%	161,448
Franklin	8,552	53.3%	4,819	30.0%	2,096	13.1%	588	3.7%	3,733	23.3%	16,055
Hancock	15,456	51.1%	9,698	32.1%	4,177	13.8%	908	3.0%	5,758	19.0%	30,239
Kennebec	33,438	53.3%	19,216	30.6%	8,131	13.0%	1,958	3.2%	14,222	22.7%	62,743
Knox	12,533	57.7%	6,129	28.2%	2,533	11.7%	526	2.5%	6,404	29.5%	21,721
Lincoln	11,515	56.1%	6,639	32.3%	1,857	9.0%	533	2.6%	4,876	23.8%	20,544
Oxford	15,283	52.8%	8,688	30.0%	3,886	13.4%	1,071	3.7%	6,595	22.8%	28,928
Penobscot	35,517	47.1%	27,913	37.0%	9,633	12.8%	2,366	3.2%	7,604	10.1%	75,429
Piscataquis	4,016	45.7%	3,522	40.1%	911	10.4%	338	3.8%	494	5.6%	8,787
Sagadahoc	12,422	60.1%	5,789	28.0%	1,818	8.8%	623	3.0%	6,633	32.1%	20,652
Somerset	11,045	45.4%	8,986	36.9%	3,387	13.9%	923	3.8%	2,059	8.5%	24,341
Waldo	10,392	50.6%	6,922	33.7%	2,525	12.3%	698	3.4%	3,470	16.9%	20,537
Washington	6,662	43.6%	5,739	37.6%	2,249	14.7%	619	4.0%	923	6.0%	15,269
York	55,958	52.8%	31,228	29.5%	15,759	14.9%	3,063	2.9%	24,730	23.3%	106,008
Totals	370,580	52.9%	215,399	30.7%	92,900	13.3%	21,720	3.1%	155,181	22.2%	700,599

Counties that flipped from Republican to Independent

- All 16

==== By congressional district ====
King won both congressional districts, which both elected Democrats.

District	King	Summers	Dill	Representative
1st	56.14%	27.95%	13.17%	Chellie Pingree
2nd	49.26%	33.88%	13.36%	Mike Michaud

== See also ==
- 2012 United States Senate elections
- 2012 United States House of Representatives elections in Maine
