= Matthew Dunlap =

American politician from Maine (born 1964)

Matt Dunlap
- Dunlap in 2019

Auditor of Maine
- Incumbent
- Assumed office November 14, 2022
- Governor: Janet Mills
- Preceded by: Jacob Norton
- In office January 4, 2021 – October 1, 2021
- Governor: Janet Mills
- Preceded by: Pola Buckley
- Succeeded by: Jacob Norton

Secretary of State of Maine
- In office January 7, 2013 – January 4, 2021
- Governor: Paul LePage; Janet Mills
- Preceded by: Charlie Summers
- Succeeded by: Shenna Bellows
- In office January 1, 2005 – January 7, 2011
- Governor: John Baldacci
- Preceded by: Dan Gwadosky
- Succeeded by: Charlie Summers

Member of the Maine House of Representatives from the 121st district
- In office December 4, 1996 – January 1, 2005
- Preceded by: Robert Keane
- Succeeded by: Constance Goldman

Personal details
- Born: November 26, 1964 (age 61) Bar Harbor, Maine, U.S.
- Party: Democratic
- Spouse: Michelle Dunphy
- Education: University of Maine (BA, MA)
- Website: Campaign website

Matthew Dunlap (born November 26, 1964) is an American politician from Maine who has served as the Maine state auditor since November 2022. He previously held the same position from January to October 2021. A member of the Democratic Party, Dunlap was secretary of state of Maine from January 7, 2013, to January 4, 2021, and previously from 2005 to 2011. In 2012, he sought to become his party's nominee to replace retiring Olympia Snowe, but lost in the primary to State Senator Cynthia Dill. He was the Democratic nominee for Maine's 2nd congressional district in the 2026 election, but lost to Republican nominee Paul LePage.

Prior to his first election as secretary of state in 2005, Dunlap represented Old Town in the Maine House of Representatives for four terms beginning in 1996. On December 2, 2020, Dunlap was elected Maine State Auditor by the Maine Legislature and took office on January 4, 2021. Dunlap had to vacate the position after failing the exams needed to meet the requirements of the position the following October, and was replaced by Jacob Norton. He did later meet the requirements and was selected for the position again on November 14, 2022.

== Early life, education, and early career ==
Matthew Dunlap was born and raised in Bar Harbor, Maine. He attended the Bar Harbor school system and graduated from Mount Desert Island High School, where he was a captain of the track team. He earned B.A. and M.A. degrees in history and English respectively from the University of Maine. Dunlap also completed the Senior Executives in State and Local Government program at Harvard University. Prior to entering politics, he worked in a variety of jobs including as a textile worker, fur trapper, publishing editor, radio talk-show host, cook, waiter, and bartender.

== Maine House of Representatives ==
=== Elections ===
In 1996, Dunlap ran to represent Old Town in the Maine House of Representatives when incumbent Robert Keane retired after one term. Dunlap defeated Republican Sean Stillings with 48% of the vote. He won re-election in 1998 with 64% of the vote, in 2000 with 68% of the vote, and in 2002 ran unopposed.

=== Tenure ===
Dunlap served in the Maine House of Representatives from 1996 to 2004. He was actively involved in environmental and wildlife issues, including serving as House Chair of the Joint Standing Committee on Inland Fisheries and Wildlife. In 1999, he proposed restructuring the Atlantic Salmon Authority. He also supported legislation that increased moose hunting permits and sponsored a bill that would allow the Department of Inland Fisheries to contract with a consulting firm for the fisheries evaluation. He opposed the banning of deer decoys and the ultimately unsuccessful 2004 Question 2 referendum, which in his opinion would end bear hunting in the state.

=== Committee assignments ===
- House Committee on Fish and Game (Chairman)
- Joint Standing Committee on Inland Fisheries and Wildlife (Chairman)
- House Committee on Reapportionment (Co-chairman)

== Secretary of state ==
In 2004, Dunlap was elected Secretary of State of Maine by the Maine Legislature, a role in which he served from 2005 until 2011. During his tenure as secretary of state, Dunlap oversaw the modernization of the way the Secretary of State's office delivers services to the public electronically and directed the implementation of Maine's Military and Overseas Voter Empowerment (MOVE) Act, allowing military personnel and others abroad secure and prompt access to the ballot. Dunlap also served as president of the National Association of Secretaries of State from 2010 until 2011. After the Republican Party took control of the Maine Legislature in 2010, Dunlap was succeeded by State Senator Charlie Summers following a vote of 53% to 47%.

Dunlap was again selected to be secretary of state by the Legislature after Democrats regained control of both chambers in the 2012 elections. He took the oath of office on January 7, 2013. He is the first person elected to non-consecutive terms as secretary of state since 1880, when S.J. Chadbourne held the position after holding it from 1876 to 1878.

He was re-elected to his position in 2014, 2016, and 2018.

In addition to his service as Maine secretary of state, he was also a member of the Presidential Advisory Commission on Election Integrity from May 2017 to January 2018. The commission was disbanded by Trump after Dunlap sued to get access to the documents he was supposed to be working with.

=== Marijuana ballot measure ===
The Campaign To Regulate Marijuana Like Alcohol, a ballot initiative that sought to put the question of marijuana legalization before Maine voters in November 2016, sued the state of Maine for invalidating 26,779 signatures. The campaign had originally turned in 99,229 signatures from registered voters by the February 1 deadline in hopes of meeting the required number of 61,123 valid signatures to make the ballot. Dunlap invalidated the signatures because the signature of the notary who signed the petitions allegedly did not match the signature on file with staff. A court reversed Dunlap's decision after petition circulators sued, stating it was an error of law, and requiring him to reconsider the petitions rejected. Dunlap declined to appeal the decision.

== State auditor ==
Dunlap reached the term limit for the office of secretary of state in 2020, and announced that he would seek the position of state auditor for the following term. The state auditor is chosen by the Maine Legislature for a four-year term, renewable once. Though Dunlap is not a certified public accountant as required by the law establishing the position, the law permits a person to be elected as long as they become a CPA within 9 months. He was elected as state auditor on December 2, 2020, by the Maine Legislature. He announced on October 1, 2021, that he had failed the exams required to become a CPA, and was required to resign as State Auditor because he was not permitted to retake the exams for 60 days.

Dunlap did obtain the credentials needed for the position, and was selected by the Legislature again on November 14, 2022.

== 2012 U.S. Senate election ==
In November 2011, Dunlap took out the necessary paperwork to run against incumbent three-term Republican Olympia Snowe, who subsequently announced on February 28, 2012, that she had decided not to seek reelection. On March 14, 2012, Dunlap filed with the office of the Maine Secretary of State the signatures necessary to qualify for the June primary ballot. Dunlap was endorsed by former Speaker of the Maine House of Representatives Glenn Cummings, the Maine chapter of the League of Young Voters and the Communications Workers of America Local 1400, among others. He finished second in the primary with 18,202 votes (35.64%), behind state representative Cynthia Dill, who won with 22,629 votes (44.31%). Dill went on to finish third in the general election, behind Republican Charlie Summers and the winner, independent Angus King.

== 2026 U.S. House of Representatives election ==
In May 2025, Dunlap expressed interest in mounting a campaign for the United States House of Representatives, representing Maine's 2nd congressional district, held by incumbent Democrat Jared Golden. On October 6, 2025, Dunlap announced a primary challenge to Golden in the 2026 election. Golden, one of the most conservative Democrats in the House, was criticized by Dunlap for being too willing to work with the Republican Party. On November 5, 2025, Golden announced he would not seek re-election. Dunlap continued his campaign, saying he is "running to deliver a people's agenda — Medicare for all, universal child care, and living wages for working families." On June 9, 2026, Dunlap won the Democratic primary, defeating state senator Joe Baldacci, former congressional aide Jordan Wood, and social worker Paige Loud after a three-round ranked-choice voting runoff. He faced former governor Paul LePage, the Republican nominee, in the general election. As neither candidate received 50 percent of the votes cast, a ranked choice tally was scheduled to begin November 9.

== Personal life ==
Dunlap lives in Old Town, Maine, with his wife, Michelle Dunphy, who served in the Maine House of Representatives from 2014 to 2022, and their daughter. Dunlap is a founder of the Maine Youth Fish and Game Association and has served on the vestry of St. James' Episcopal Church in Old Town. As of November 2025, he also serves as announcer for the Bangor Band.

== Electoral history ==
2026 Maine's 2nd congressional district Democratic primary results
Party	Candidate	Round 1			Round 2			Round 3	
Party	Candidate	Votes	%	Transfer	Votes	%	Transfer	Votes	%
Democratic	Matthew Dunlap	22,933	29.1	+ 2,748	25,681	33.4	+ 10,243	35,924	52.5
Democratic	Joe Baldacci	24,966	31.7	+ 957	25,923	33.7	+ 6,632	32,555	47.5
Democratic	Jordan Wood	22,712	28.8	+ 2,665	25,377	33.0	25,377	Eliminated	
Democratic	Paige Loud	8,194	10.4	8,194	Eliminated				
Continuing ballots		78,805	100.0		76,981	97.7		68,479	86.9
Exhausted ballots		–		+ 1,824	1,824	2.3	+ 8,502	10,326	13.1
Total votes		78,805	100.0		78,805	100.0		78,805	100.0

Democratic primary results, 2012 United States Senate election in Maine
Party	Candidate	Votes	%
Democratic	Cynthia Dill	22,629	44.31
Democratic	Matt Dunlap	18,202	35.64
Democratic	Jon Hinck	6,302	12.34
Democratic	Benjamin Pollard	3,945	7.72
Total votes		51,078	100

Maine House of Representatives Election 2002
Party	Candidate	Votes	%	±%
Democratic	Matthew Dunlap (unopposed)	2,549	100%	+31.97%

Maine House of Representatives Election 2000
Party	Candidate	Votes	%	±%
Democratic	Matthew Dunlap	2,578	68.03%	+3.73%
Republican	Albert J. Duplessis	1,211	31.97%	−

Maine House of Representatives Election 1998
Party	Candidate	Votes	%	±%
Democratic	Matthew Dunlap	1,584	64.30%	+16.02%
Republican	Marie C. Grady	879	35.70%	−

Maine House of Representatives Election 1996
Party	Candidate	Votes	%	±%
Democratic	Matthew Dunlap	1,862	48.28%	−
Republican	Sean Stillings	1,053	27.31%	−
Independent	Ralph I. Coffman	941	24.41%	−

Political offices
Preceded by Dan Gwadosky	Secretary of State of Maine; 2005–2011	Succeeded by Charlie Summers
Preceded by Charlie Summers	Secretary of State of Maine; 2013–2021	Succeeded by Shenna Bellows
