= Senator Courtney =

Senator Courtney may refer to:

- Jonathan Courtney (born 1966), Maine State Senate
- Peter Courtney (born 1943), Oregon State Senate
- Thomas G. Courtney (born 1947), Iowa State Senate
- Thomas J. Courtney (1892–1971), Illinois State Senate
