= Kemwel =

Kemwel is an independent car rental consolidator based in Portland, Maine, United States, with access to over 750,000 vehicles in Europe and worldwide from over 4,000 pick up locations.

== Background ==
The company dates from 1908 as a parking garage in New York City but became a Studebaker dealer, then, finally in 1958, a Mercedes-Benz dealer. It was the addition of the Mercedes line that prompted the owner to branch out into rental vehicles.

Due to Mercedes' insistence that buyers come to the factory in Germany to buy the vehicles at a discounted price, once there, the customers usually had to wait while the vehicle was being built. Most of these clients needed transportation, so the idea to branch out into car rentals was born and implemented.

In 2001, Kemwel moved to Portland, Maine. It is a sister company to Auto Europe. Kemwel focuses now on low-cost and student car rentals, Peugeot short term car leasing, and budget airfare.

== See also ==
- Uhaul Car Share
- National Car Rental
