= Charlie Summers =

American politician

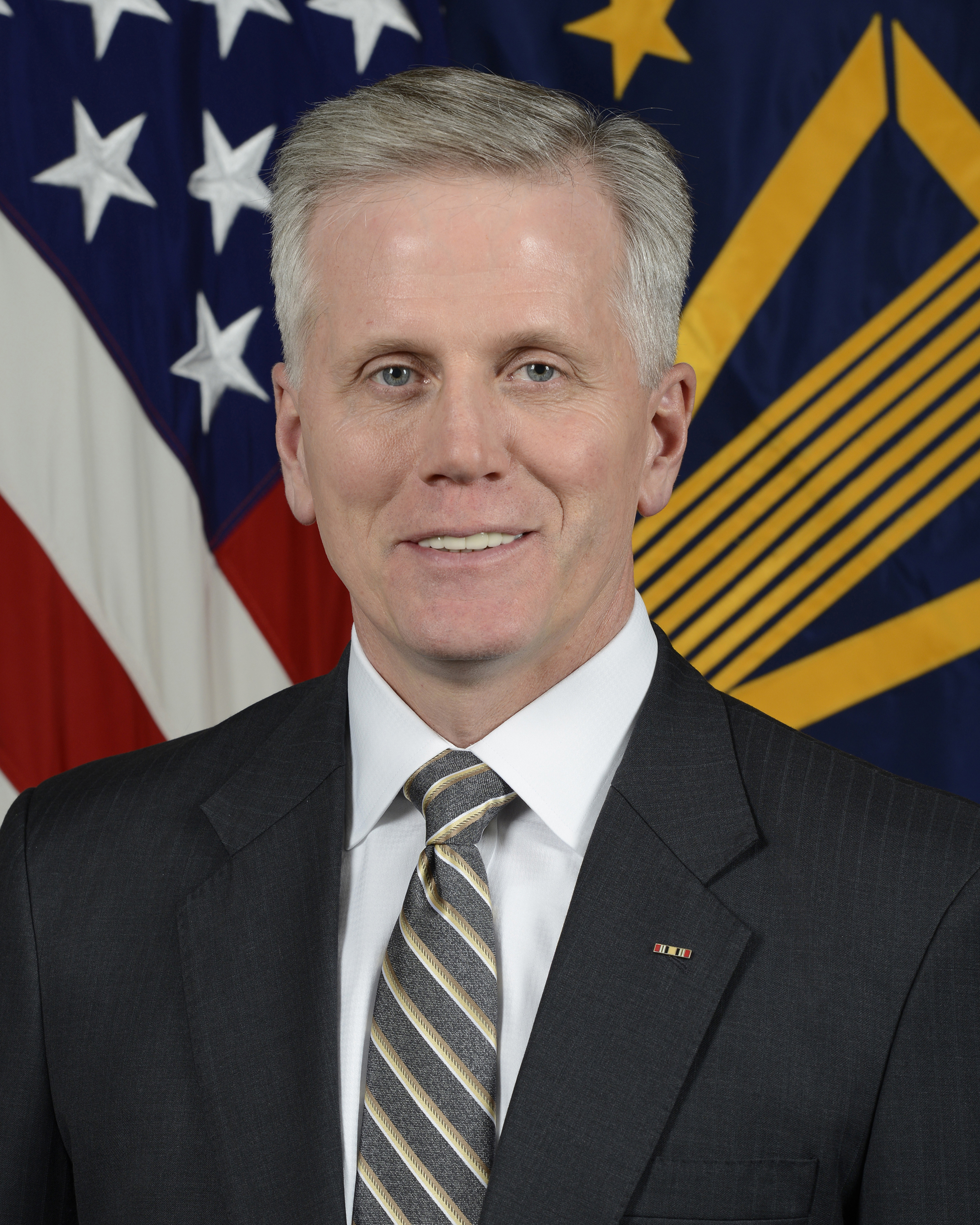

Assistant to the Secretary of Defense for Public Affairs
- Acting
- In office January 1, 2019 – May 19, 2019
- President: Donald Trump
- Preceded by: Dana White
- Succeeded by: Jonathan Rath Hoffman

48th Secretary of State of Maine
- In office January 5, 2011 – January 7, 2013
- Governor: Paul LePage
- Preceded by: Matthew Dunlap
- Succeeded by: Matthew Dunlap

Member of the Maine Senate from the 31st district
- In office January 3, 1991 – January 3, 1995
- Preceded by: Barry Hobbins
- Succeeded by: Joan Pendexter

Personal details
- Born: December 26, 1959 (age 66) Danville, Illinois, U.S.
- Party: Republican
- Education: Black Hawk College; University of Illinois, Urbana-Champaign (BS)

Charles E. Summers Jr. (born December 26, 1959) is an American politician, businessman, and Iraq War veteran. A Republican from the state of Maine, he served as Acting Assistant to the Secretary of Defense for Public Affairs in the first Trump Administration.

A member of the Maine Senate from 1991 to 1995, Summers ran for the Republican nomination for Maine's 1st congressional district in 1994, finishing second in the primary. He was the nominee for the same seat in 2004 and 2008, losing on each occasion to the Democratic candidate. From 2011 to 2013, he served as the Secretary of State of Maine. He was the Republican nominee for the U.S. Senate to succeed retiring Republican Olympia Snowe in the 2012 election, but lost to former independent Governor Angus King.

== Early life, education, and early political career ==
He was born in Danville, Illinois in 1959. His family moved to Kewanee, Illinois where he grew up & helped run Hotel Kewanee with his mother and father from the years 1962 to 1992. In 1978 graduated from Kewanee High School in 1978 Kewanee. He earned an AA from Blackhawk College and a BS in leisure studies from University of Illinois at Urbana-Champaign in 1984. After college he moved to Bangor, Maine where became the Assistant Manager of the Bangor Motor Inn. He and his first wife, Dr. Debra J. Summers, Ph.D., later moved to southern Maine where he worked as part of the management team of the South Portland Motor Inn. He later opened his own small business, "Charlie's Beverage Warehouse", in Biddeford, Maine. Debra Summers died in a 1997 automobile accident.

Summers was State Director for United States Senator Olympia Snowe from 1995 to 2004. He has served in various elected and appointed political positions, most recently (March 2005 – June 2007) as the New England Regional Administrator (Region I) for the U.S. Small Business Administration (SBA). He monitored oversight of SBA's Financing, Marketing, and Outreach efforts in Offices from six states: Connecticut, Maine, Massachusetts, New Hampshire, Rhode Island, and Vermont.

== Maine Senate ==
=== Elections ===
He was elected in 1990, becoming the first Republican to represent Maine's 31st Senate District. He was re-elected in 1992, but decided to retire in 1994 in order to run for a seat in the U.S. House of Representatives.

=== Committee assignments ===
- Joint Standing Committee on Legal Affairs
- Joint Standing Committee on Inland Fisheries and Wildlife
- Joint Standing Committee on Taxation (Ranking Member)

== Congressional elections ==
=== 1994 ===
Democratic U.S. Congressman Thomas H. Andrews, of Maine's 1st congressional district, decided to retire in order to run for the U.S. Senate. Opponents included Kevin Keogh (former Chairman of the Maine Republican Party), Ted Rand (City Councilman), and James Longley, Jr. (son of former Governor James Longley, Sr.). Longley won the primary with 43% of the vote. Summers ranked second with 25%.

=== 2004 ===
Summers decided to challenge Democratic U.S. Congressman Tom Allen, of the 1st CD. He lost 60%–40%.

=== 2008 ===
Allen decided to retire in 2008 in order to run for the U.S. Senate. Summers decided to run for the seat again. In the Republican primary, he defeated Dean Scontras 60%–40%. In the general election, he lost to Democratic State Senator Chellie Pingree, 55%–45%.

== Military service ==
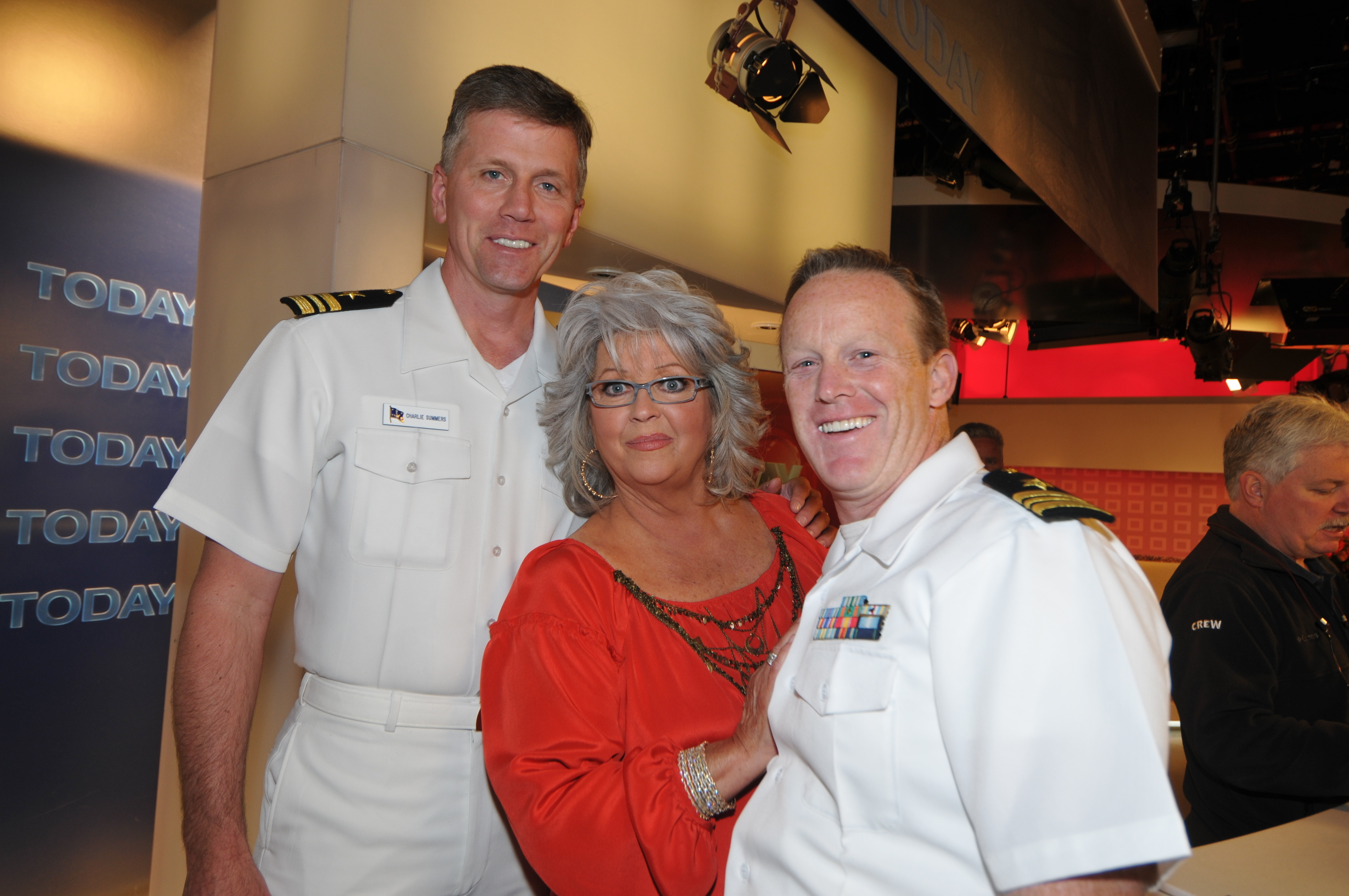
Charlie Summers and Sean Spicer with Paula Deen on the set of the Today show in 2009

Summers has served in the U.S. Navy Reserve since 1996 as a public affairs officer, currently holding the rank of Captain (CAPT). As of December 2016, he was serving as Director, Navy Office of Information, U.S. Naval Forces Europe-Africa/U.S. 6th Fleet.

He was recalled after the September 11 attacks, serving at the Pentagon under Gordon R. England, the U.S. Secretary of the Navy. In July 2007, he was deployed to Iraq to participate in Operation Iraqi Freedom with Multi National Forces-Iraq Strategic Effects Directorate. He returned home in May 2008. From October 2009 to October 2010, he served on active duty on the staff of the Chairman of the Joint Chiefs of Staff, Admiral Mike Mullen. During this time, he completed a temporary assignment as a member of Combined Forces Special Operations Component Command-Afghanistan (CFSOCC-A).

He served on active duty as Director of Public Affairs for Vice Admiral Robin Braun, Chief of the Navy Reserve from 2014 to 2016.

His military decorations include the Defense Meritorious Service Medal, Meritorious Service Medal, Joint Service Commendation Medal, Navy and Marine Corps Achievement Medal (four awards), U.S. Army Combat Action Badge, Afghanistan Campaign Medal, Iraq Campaign Medal and various other service awards.

== Maine Secretary of State ==
On December 1, 2010, Summers was elected Maine's Secretary of State by the state legislature in Augusta. His two-year term began on January 6, 2011.

On June 26, 2012, Summers faced criticism from the Maine Democratic Party over a shortage of voter registration cards for candidates to distribute. A spokesperson for the Party claimed it was another example of Summers attempting to make it harder to vote, along with his support of a failed effort to eliminate same-day voter registration in Maine the prior year, as well as his investigation of college students for alleged voter fraud. Summers noted that potential voters can print a card from the Internet at any time, and that updated registration cards will be available in a few weeks.

== 2012 U.S. Senate election ==
In 2012, Summers announced that he would be a candidate for the United States Senate to succeed incumbent Olympia Snowe, who decided to retire. On June 12, Summers won a multi-candidate primary with 30% of the vote and faced former Independent Governor Angus King, and Democratic State Senator Cynthia Dill in the general election. Despite the support of Senator Snowe and the other Senator from Maine Susan Collins, Summers lost the election to King.

The Maine People's Alliance called on Summers to resign his position as Secretary of State of Maine, stating that it was a conflict of interest for the Secretary of State to oversee their own election to another office. They also had concerns over past actions in sending letters to college students about voter registration requirements. A spokesperson for Summers stated that he had turned over all election oversight to a deputy Secretary of State. No Secretary of State or Maine Attorney General who was seeking higher office in the last 30 years has resigned. Summers has stated that his critics "want me to resign and I'm not going to do it."

== Personal life ==
Summers married his wife Ruth (Rayburn) in 2002. He has three children.

Maine Senate
Preceded by Barry Hobbins	Member of the Maine Senate from the 31st district 1991–1995	Succeeded by Joan Pendexter
Political offices
Preceded by Matthew Dunlap	Secretary of State of Maine; 2011–2013	Succeeded by Matthew Dunlap
Party political offices
Preceded by Olympia Snowe	Republican nominee for U.S. Senator from Maine (Class 1); 2012	Succeeded by Eric Brakey
