= Robert Browne Hall =

American composer (born 1858)

Veni, Vidi, Vici (1896)
Robert Browne Hall's 1896 march, Veni, Vidi, Vici, performed by the United States Air Force Band.

Robert Browne Hall (30 June 1858 Bowdoinham, Maine – 8 June 1907), usually known as R. B. Hall, was a leading composer of marches and other music for wind bands.

== Life and career ==
A principal American composer of marching music, Hall was born in Bowdoinham, Maine and seldom left his native state during his lifetime, dying in Portland. His music though has traveled around the world. He is particularly popular in the United Kingdom, so much so that many lovers of brass band music there mistakenly imagine that Hall is an English composer. His celebrated "Tenth Regiment March", written in 1895 and dedicated to the Tenth Regiment Band in Albany, New York, is a well-known staple of brass band concerts and competitions all over the UK, under the title "Death or Glory".

Hall was famous during his lifetime as a particularly fine player on the cornet and served for a time as conductor of the Bangor Band. As soloist, conductor, composer and teacher, Hall is still remembered in Maine. The last Saturday in June every year is officially Robert Browne Hall Day in the State of Maine.

Hall suffered a stroke in 1902 from which he never recovered. He died in poverty in Portland as a result of nephritis five years later, and was buried in Evergreen Cemetery in Richmond, Maine. His widow sold the manuscripts of many compositions. Unscrupulous publishers assembled and realized from fragments works they passed off as genuine Hall compositions.

== List of compositions ==
He left over a hundred marches and other compositions, including such classics as:

- Officer of the Day March
- Canton Halifax March
- Independentia March
- The New Colonial March
- Tenth Regiment March (Death or Glory)
- Gardes du Corps March
- Albanian March
- American Cadet March
- Charge of the Battalion
- Colonel Fitch March
- Colonel Philbrook March
- The Commander March
- Commonwealth March
- Dunlap Commandery March
- Fort Popham March
- Greeting to Bangor March
- Hamlin Rifles March
- Marche Funebre
- Norembega March
- S.I.B.A. March
- Second Regiment P.M. March
- Veni, Vidi, Vici March
- W.M.B. March

== In popular culture ==
The trio from Hall's New Colonial March provides the music for Stanford University's official fight song, Come Join the Band.

The trio from Hall's "Officer of the Day March" provides the melody for the Alma Mater of Carleton College in Northfield, Minnesota.

His March "Death or Glory", 1895 is the music in the opening scene of the 1996 comedy-drama film about a Yorkshire coal-miner's band, "Brassed Off".
