= Chellie Pingree =

American politician (born 1955)

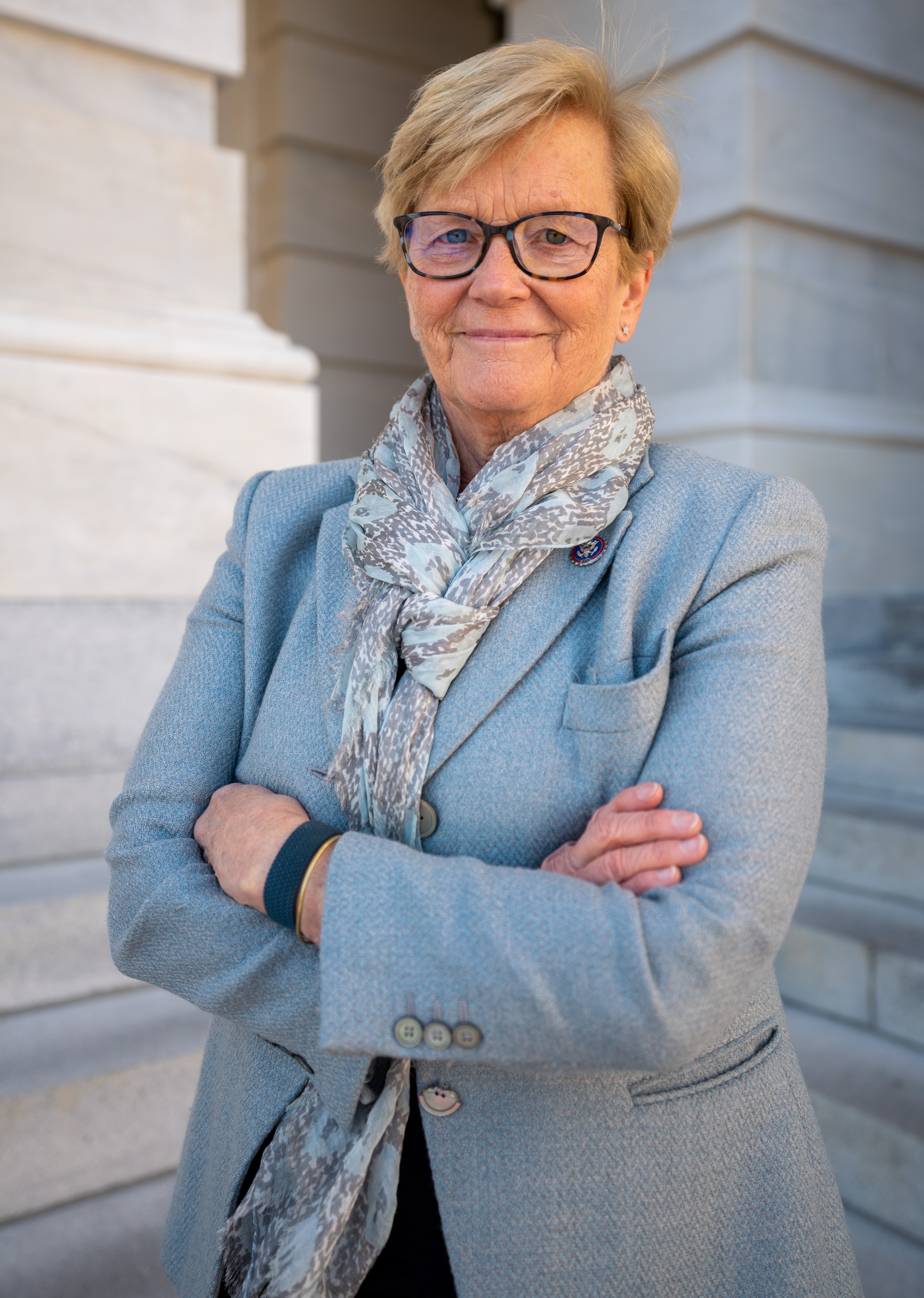
- Official portrait, 2023

Member of the U.S. House of Representatives from Maine's 1st district
- Incumbent
- Assumed office January 3, 2009
- Preceded by: Tom Allen

Member of the Maine Senate
- In office December 2, 1992 – December 6, 2000
- Preceded by: Linda Curtis Brawn
- Succeeded by: Christine Savage
- Constituency: 21st district (1992–1994); 12th district (1994–2000)

Personal details
- Born: Rochelle Marie Johnson; April 2, 1955 (age 71) Minneapolis, Minnesota, U.S.
- Party: Democratic
- Spouses: Charlie Pingree (divorced); Donald Sussman (m. 2011; div. 2016)
- Children: 3, including Hannah
- Education: University of Southern Maine (attended); College of the Atlantic (BA)
- Awards: Maine Women's Hall of Fame (2001)
- Website: House website Campaign website
- Pingree's voice Pingree opposing the Trump administration's decision to allow offshore drilling in all U.S. waters. Recorded January 18, 2018

Chellie Marie Pingree (/ˈʃɛli ˈpɪŋɡriː/ SHELL-ee PING-gree; born Rochelle Marie Johnson; April 2, 1955) is an American politician serving as the U.S. representative for Maine's 1st congressional district since 2009. Her district includes most of the southern part of the state, centered on Greater Portland.

A member of the Democratic Party, Pingree was a member of the Maine Senate from 1992 to 2000, serving as majority leader for her last four years. She ran for the United States Senate in 2002, losing to incumbent Republican Susan Collins. From 2003 until 2006, she was president and CEO of Common Cause. She is the first Democratic woman elected to the U.S. House of Representatives from Maine. She is the Deputy Whip of the Congressional Progressive Caucus. Pingree is set to become the dean of Maine's congressional delegation in 2027 following Senator Collins's defeat. Pingree's daughter, Hannah, is the governor-elect of Maine.

== Early life, education, and early career ==
Pingree was born Rochelle Marie Johnson, in Minneapolis, Minnesota, the daughter of Harry, who worked in advertising, and Dorothy Johnson, a nurse. She moved to Maine as a teenager and had her first name legally changed to Chellie. She attended the University of Southern Maine and graduated from College of the Atlantic with a degree in human ecology. Since graduating from College of the Atlantic, she has resided on North Haven, a small island community off the coast of Rockland.

Pingree held various farming and care-taking jobs until 1981, when she started North Island Yarn, a cottage industry of hand knitters with a retail store on North Haven. Her business expanded and became North Island Designs, employing as many as ten workers. They began marketing knitting kits and pattern books nationwide through 1,200 retail stores and 100,000 mail-order catalogues. Through North Island Designs, Pingree authored and produced five knitting books between 1986 and 1992. Eisenhower Fellowships selected her as a USA Eisenhower Fellow in 1997.

== Common Cause ==
As the leader of Common Cause, Pingree was active in the organization's programs in media reform, elections, ethics, and money in politics. She supported net neutrality, mandatory voter-verified paper ballots, public financing of congressional elections, national popular vote (a workaround for the Electoral College), and an independent ethics commission for Congress. She stepped down from Common Cause in February 2007 to return to her home state and run for Congress in 2008.

== Maine Senate ==
=== Elections ===
Pingree was first elected to the Maine Senate in 1992, winning election in the 21st district, carrying every town in the district apart from Belmont. She was outspoken against going to war against Iraq, although counseled by party insiders to avoid that subject. She was redistricted to the 12th district, and reelected in 1994, 1996, and 1998. In 2000, she was unable to seek reelection due to term limits.

=== Tenure ===
Pingree represented Knox County in the Maine Senate. She was elected Maine's second female majority leader in 1996.

During her tenure as a state legislator, Pingree made nationwide headlines when she authored the nation's first bill regulating prescription drug prices, Maine Rx. She also shepherded Maine's largest land-bill initiative, Land for Maine's Future.

== 2002 U.S. Senate campaign ==
In 2002, Pingree ran for the U.S. Senate seat held by Republican Susan Collins. Collins, a popular moderate incumbent, won 58% to 42%.

== U.S. House of Representatives ==
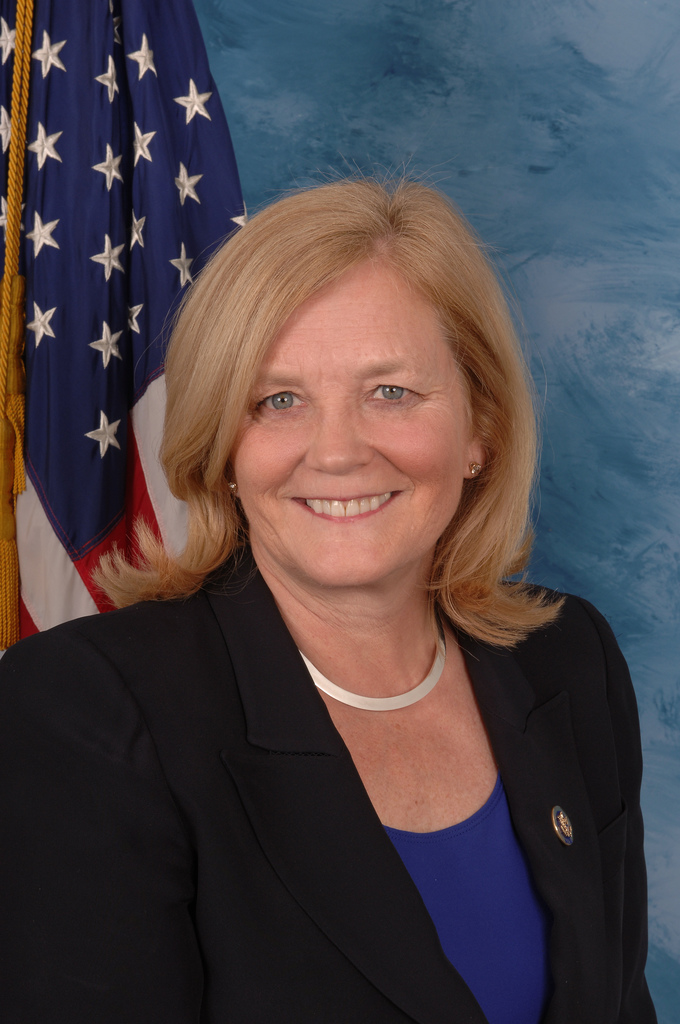
Pingree during the 111th Congress

=== Elections ===
2008

In April 2007, Pingree filed papers for her bid to run for Maine's 1st congressional district.

On August 15, 2007, EMILY's List endorsed Pingree for Congress. In December 2007, she was endorsed by 21st Century Democrats. She was endorsed by a number of labor organizations and many individuals and state officials, including Congressman Rush D. Holt Jr.; Congresswoman Jan Schakowsky; Maine Senate majority leader Libby Mitchell; former Maine Senate assistant majority leader Anne Rand; state representative Paulette Beaudoin; progressive writer and activist Jim Hightower; the United Auto Workers; Planned Parenthood, and the League of Conservation Voters. She defeated five other candidates in the Democratic primary (including future Portland mayors Ethan Strimling and Michael F. Brennan and 2000 United States Senate nominee Mark Lawrence), receiving 43% of the vote.

Pingree was elected to the U.S. House of Representatives on November 4, 2008, defeating Republican Charlie Summers 54.9%–45.1%. She was sworn in on January 3, 2009.

2010

Pingree was reelected in 2010, defeating Republican nominee Dean Scontras by a 57% to 43% margin. She overcame strong anti-Democrat and anti-incumbent political sentiment to become just one of eight House Democrats to receive a higher percentage of the vote than in 2008.

In July 2015, the Federal Election Commission (FEC) found that Pingree's campaign violated federal election laws regarding two 2010 flights on a private jet owned by her then-fiance; the investigation resulted in a conciliation agreement requiring the campaign to pay a $9,750 civil penalty and reimburse over $13,000 for the flights.

2012

On February 29, 2012, an Associated Press story mentioned that Pingree was starting to circulate petitions to run for the U.S. Senate seat vacated by the retirement of Olympia Snowe, which she confirmed on The Rachel Maddow Show later that night. She withdrew her name from the race on March 7, following the entry of former governor Angus King, and was reelected to the House. She defeated Republican State Senate majority leader Jonathan Courtney by a 64.8%–35.2% margin.

2014

In 2014, Pingree won with 60% of the vote against a Republican who had not previously run for elective office in Isaac Misiuk, and an independent candidate in Richard P. Murphy. Pingree outpaced Misiuk by nearly 30 points.

2016

In 2016, Pingree defeated Republican nominee Mark Holbrook by around 16 points, with Libertarian Party of Maine nominee James Bouchard taking 3.6% of the vote.

2018

In late 2017, Pingree's name was mentioned as a potential Democratic candidate for governor of Maine, to succeed term-limited incumbent Paul LePage. In mid-December, she announced plans to run for reelection to the House. Pingree defeated Holbrook again by around 26 points, with Independent Martin Grohman taking 8.7%.

2020

Pingree was reelected, defeating Republican nominee Jay Allen by a 62.2%–37.8% margin.

2022

Pingree was reelected in 2022, defeating Republican nominee Edwin Thelander by 24 percentage points.

2024

Pingree was reelected in 2024 with 58% of the vote, defeating Republican nominee Ronald Russell by 22 percentage points, with Independent Ethan Alcorn taking 4.9% of the vote.

=== Tenure ===
Soon after her election, Pingree joined the Congressional Progressive Caucus, of which she is now vice chair. She continues to serve actively within the caucus as a Deputy Whip.

In September 2010, a video surfaced on the internet showing Pingree at Portland International Jetport disembarking from a private jet owned by her then-fiancé, hedge fund manager S. Donald Sussman. This drew criticism due to past statements Pingree had made, in which she criticized legislators who used private aircraft. Pingree declined to respond. The House Ethics Committee, in a bipartisan letter, initially stated the travel was permissible under House ethics rules. However, the Federal Election Commission later fined her $9,750 in July 2015 for accepting these campaign-related jet rides, and mandated that she reimburse $13,500 to the company for using the jet to travel to campaign fundraisers.

=== Legislation sponsored ===
On May 23, 2013, Pingree introduced the York River Wild and Scenic River Study Act of 2013 (H.R. 2197; 113th Congress). If passed, the bill would require the National Park Service (NPS) to study a segment of the York River in Maine for potential addition to the Wild and Scenic Rivers System. The study would determine how the proposed designation would affect recreational and commercial activities. The study would cost approximately $500,000.

=== Committee assignments ===
- Committee on Appropriations (2013–present)
  - Subcommittee on Agriculture, Rural Development, Food and Drug Administration, and Related Agencies
  - Subcommittee on Interior, Environment, and Related Agencies (Ranking Member)

==== Past ====
- Committee on Agriculture (2009–2012)
  - Subcommittee on Conservation, Energy, and Forestry
  - Subcommittee on Nutrition and Horticulture
- Committee on Armed Services (2009–2012)
  - Subcommittee on Military Personnel
  - Subcommittee on Seapower and Projection Forces

=== Caucus memberships ===
- Congressional Progressive Caucus (Deputy Whip)
- Congressional Arts Caucus
- Afterschool Caucuses
- Congressional Equality Caucus
- Blue Collar Caucus
- United States Congressional International Conservation Caucus
- Medicare for All Caucus
- Congressional Coalition on Adoption
- Rare Disease Caucus
- Congressional Ukraine Caucus
- Congressional Wildlife Refuge Caucus

== Political positions ==
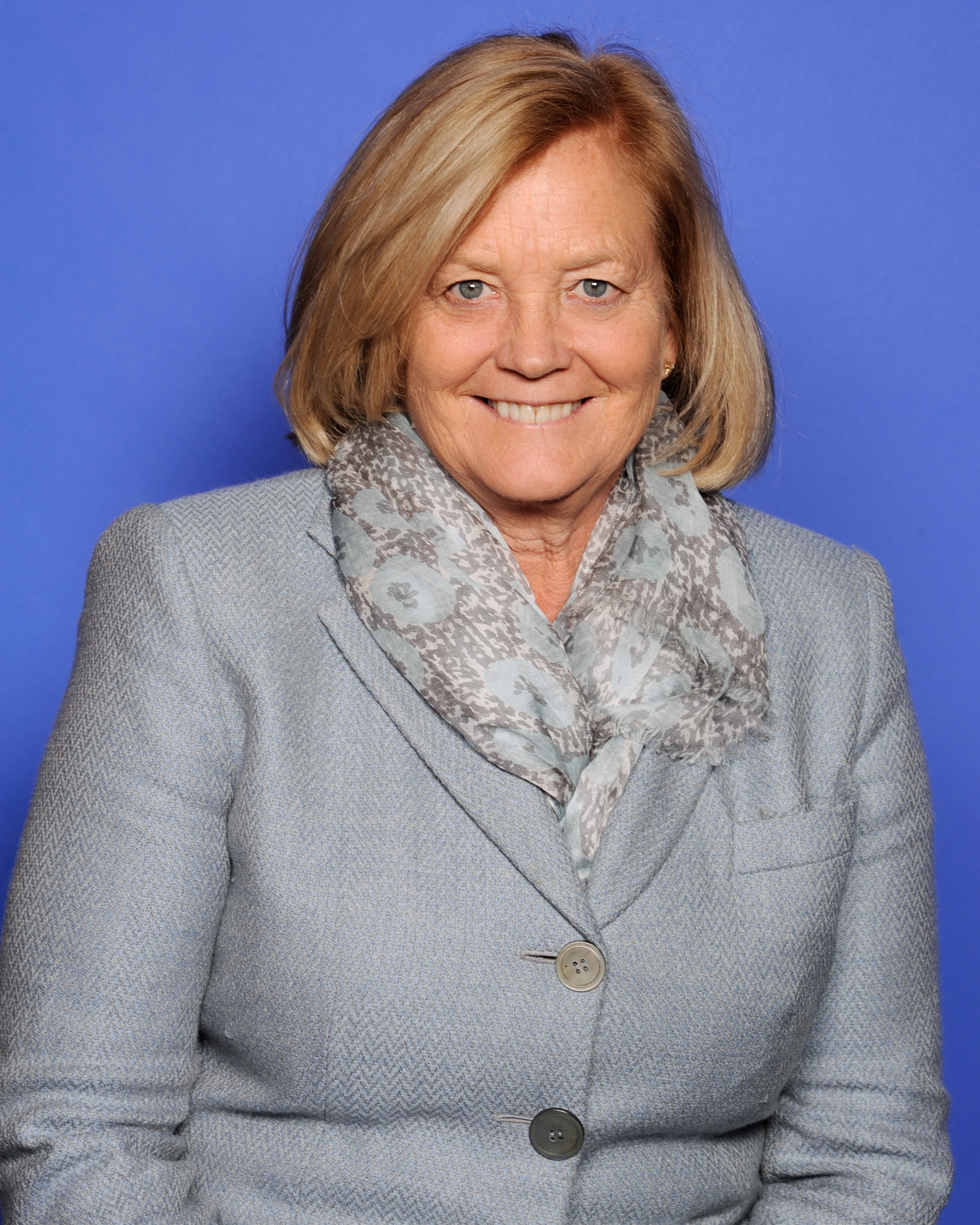
Pingree during the 114th Congress.

=== Trade agreements ===
Pingree opposes granting the president fast track authority in negotiating trade agreements, having voted against doing so on June 12, 2015. She said that such agreements need more transparency and debate, not less.

=== U.S. defense spending ===
Pingree has opposed increases to the U.S. federal defense budget. She has voted against several annual National Defense Authorization Act (NDAA) measures.

=== Campaign finance ===
Pingree helped draft the Fair Elections Now Act, a proposal to provide public Fair Elections funding for popular candidates who raised a sufficient number of small local contributions. She has spoken out against the 2011 Supreme Court ruling McComish v. Bennett, which limits public financing systems for congressional campaigns.

=== Financial Disclosure and the STOCK Act ===
In June 2025, it was reported that Pingree had violated the Stop Trading on Congressional Knowledge (STOCK) Act by failing to disclose six separate purchases that she had made of United States Treasury securities within the legally mandated 45-day window. The transactions were valued between $90,000 and $300,000. Pingree said it was due to a "paperwork error" and immediately refilled the correct paperwork and paid the $200 penalty.

=== Gun control ===
Pingree supports stricter federal gun control. She supports expanding universal background checks for all gun purchases, and reinstating the Federal Assault Weapons Ban. She also supports stricter regulations on high-capacity magazines and military-style semi-automatic weapons.

=== Agriculture ===
Pingree has advocated for stricter federal oversight and tighter environmental regulations regarding agricultural pesticides. She co-introduced a law to ban the herbicide paraquat.

=== Voting ===
In April 2025, Pingree voted against the Safeguard American Voter Eligibility Act (SAVE Act), a bill requiring individuals to provide documentary proof of U.S. citizenship, such as a passport or birth certificate, when registering to vote in federal elections.

=== Border control ===
Pingree has supported legislative measures aimed at reducing the Department of Homeland Security's authority to conduct warrantless stops from 100 miles to 25 miles of the U.S. border.

=== Donald Trump ===
In 2017, Pingree did not attend the inauguration of Donald Trump, instead visiting a Planned Parenthood center and a business owned by immigrants. She attended the 2017 Women's March the next day and stood on stage with other politicians who had refused to attend the inauguration. In July 2019, Pingree joined 95 Democrats voting for an impeachment resolution against Trump. Maine representative Jared Golden and 136 other Democrats joined all Republicans to kill the resolution.

On December 18, 2019, Pingree voted to impeach Trump.

=== Antisemitism ===
Pingree broke with the majority of the House by voting against the Antisemitism Awareness Act of 2023, which sought to establish an official federal definition of antisemitism to assist the Department of Education in monitoring discrimination on college campuses, and which passed the U.S. House of Representatives in a 320–91 vote. In 2024, she was also one of only 43 lawmakers who voted against a bi-partisan House resolution condemning the phrase "From the river to the sea, Palestine will be free" as antisemitic.

=== Foreign policy ===
Pingree has voted against interventionist foreign policy. In March 2011, she voted for a resolution to remove forces from Afghanistan. In June 2011, she voted for House Resolution 292, preventing President Barack Obama from deploying ground forces in Libya. In 2023, Pingree was among 56 Democrats to vote in favor of H.Con.Res. 21, which directed President Joe Biden to remove U.S. troops from Syria within 180 days.

==== Ukraine-Russia ====
At the same time, Pingree has supported comprehensive military aid to Ukraine. She voted in favor of a $60.8 billion defense package for Ukraine passed in April 2024, as Ukraine fought in the Russo-Ukrainian war.

==== Israel-Palestine ====
In July 2019, Pingree voted against H. Res. 246 - 116th Congress, a House Resolution introduced by fellow Democrat Brad Schneider opposing efforts to boycott the State of Israel and the global Boycott, Divestment and Sanctions movement targeting Israel. The resolution passed 398–17. She has also pushed for the United States to unilaterally recognize a Palestinian state.

Pingree has voted against providing military support to Israel. She also co-sponsored a resolution by representative Rashida Tlaib seeking to condemning Israel's killing of Palestinians in Gaza and label it as a genocide; it was referred to the House Committee on Foreign Affairs, with no further action being taken as of July 2026.

=== Climate change ===
Alongside her House colleagues, Pingree urged President Joe Biden to declare a national climate emergency. She supports Alexandria Ocasio-Cortez's Green New Deal resolution.

== Electoral history ==
Year	Office	Candidate	Party	Votes	%	Opponent	Party	Votes	%	Opponent	Party	Votes	%
2008	Maine's; 1st congressional district	Chellie Pingree	Democratic	205,629	54.90%	Charlie Summers	Republican	168,930	45.10%				
2010	Maine's; 1st congressional district	Chellie Pingree	Democratic	169,114	56.82%	Dean Scontras	Republican	128,501	43.17%	Other	Other	42	0.01%
2012	Maine's; 1st congressional district	Chellie Pingree	Democratic	236,363	64.79%	Jonathan Courtney	Republican	128,440	35.21%				
2014	Maine's; 1st congressional district	Chellie Pingree	Democratic	186,309	60.3%	Isaac Misiuk	Republican	94,847	30.7%	Richard Murphy	Other	27,669	9.0%
2016	Maine's; 1st congressional district	Chellie Pingree	Democratic	227,546	57.9%	Mark Holbrook	Republican	164,569	42.1%	James Bouchard	Libertarian	14,551	3.6%
2018	Maine's; 1st congressional district	Chellie Pingree	Democratic	198,853	58.8%	Mark Holbrook	Republican	109,714	32.4%	Martin Grohman	Independent	29,569	8.7%
2020	Maine's; 1st congressional district	Chellie Pingree	Democratic	271,004	62.2%	Jay Allen	Republican	165,008	37.8%				
2022	Maine's; 1st congressional district	Chellie Pingree	Democratic	218,630	62.8%	Ed Thelander	Republican	128,996	37.1%				
2024	Maine's; 1st congressional district	Chellie Pingree	Democratic	249,798	58.7%	Ronald Russell	Republican	154,849	36.4%	Ethan Alcorn	Independent	20,883	4.9%

2008 U.S. House Democratic primary, 1st district of Maine
Party	Candidate	Votes	%
Democratic	Chellie Pingree	24,324	43.9
Democratic	Adam Cote	15,706	28.3
Democratic	Michael Brennan	6,040	10.9
Democratic	Ethan Strimling	5,833	10.5
Democratic	Mark Lawrence	2,726	4.9
Democratic	Steve Meister	753	1.3
Total votes		55,382	100

Maine U.S. Senate Election 2002
Party	Candidate	Votes	%	±%
Republican	Susan Collins (incumbent)	299,266	58.4	
Democratic	Chellie Pingree	205,901	41.6	

== Personal life ==
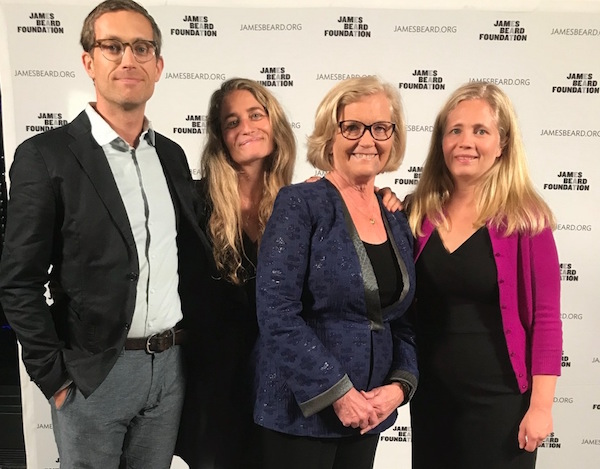
Pingree (second from right) and her three children (from left to right): Asa, Cecily and Hannah

Pingree has three children; the oldest, Hannah Pingree, is the Governor-elect of Maine following her victory in the 2026 election.

On June 18, 2011, Pingree married S. Donald Sussman, a hedge fund manager, in a private ceremony at the couple's home in North Haven, Maine. Until June 1, 2015, Sussman owned a 75% stake in MaineToday Media, the owners of the Portland Press Herald, Kennebec Journal, and Morning Sentinel, in addition to sitting on the board of directors. Articles in those papers that discussed Pingree carried a disclaimer noting her marriage to Sussman.

Sussman completed the sale of his stake in MaineToday Media on June 1, 2015.

Pingree released a statement on September 8, 2015, announcing her separation and beginning of divorce proceedings from Sussman. She called it an "amicable and truly mutual decision". They divorced in the summer of 2016.

Pingree and her daughter Hannah co-own the Nebo Lodge Inn & Restaurant on Maine's North Haven Island.

== See also ==
- Women in the United States House of Representatives

Party political offices
Preceded by Joseph Brennan	Democratic nominee for U.S. Senator from Maine (Class 2); 2002	Succeeded by Tom Allen
U.S. House of Representatives
Preceded by Tom Allen	Member of the U.S. House of Representatives from Maine's 1st congressional district 2009–present	Incumbent
U.S. order of precedence (ceremonial)
Preceded by Tom McClintock	United States representatives by seniority 69th	Succeeded by Glenn Thompson
