= Cruise America =

Recreational vehicle company based in Mesa, Arizona

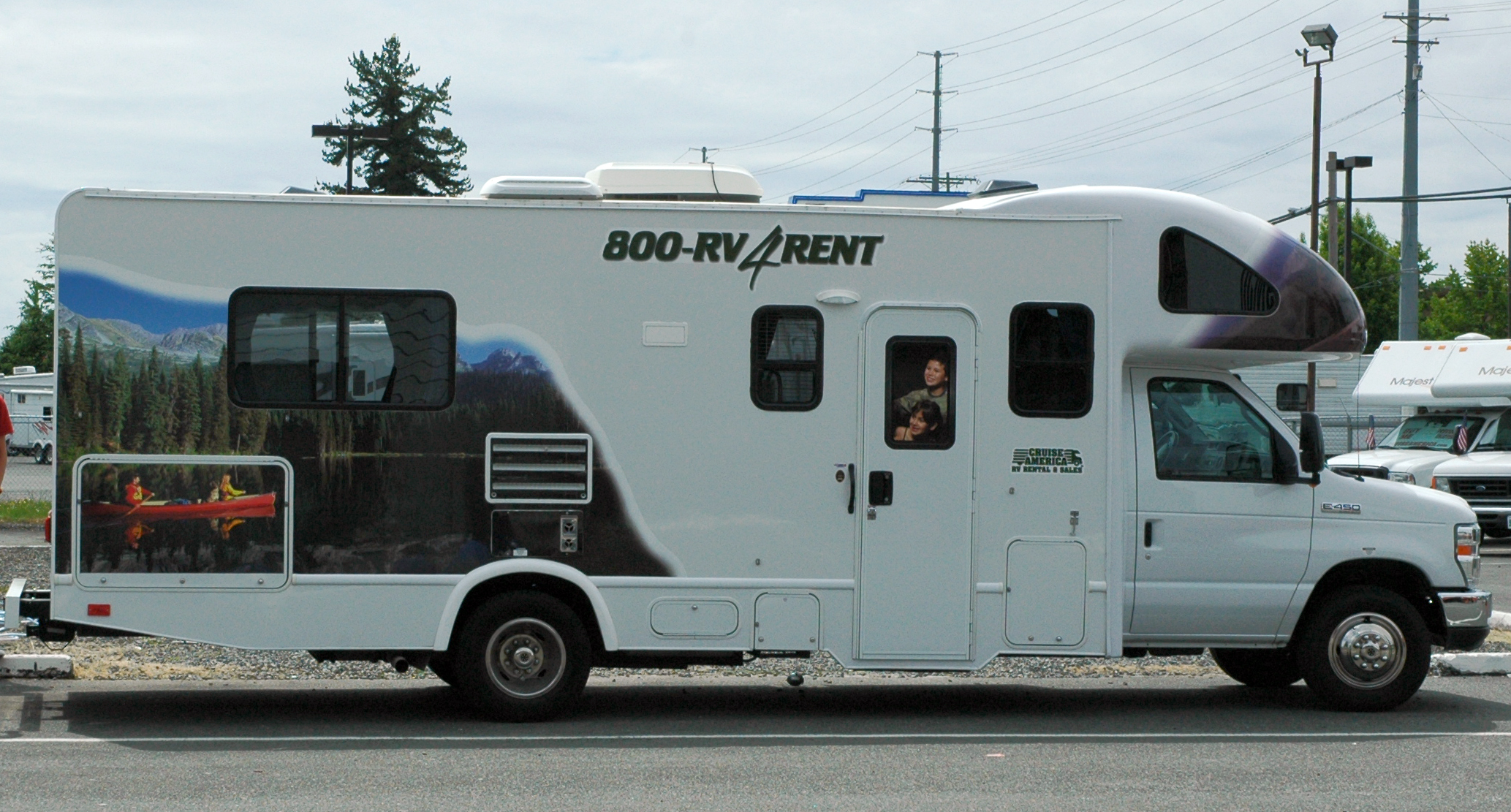
A 30-foot Cruise America Ford E-450 recreational vehicle.

Cruise America is an American Employee Owned (ESOP) recreational vehicle rental and sales company based in Mesa, Arizona.

The company was founded in 1972 and was publicly traded in the American Stock Exchange under the ticker “RVR” until 1997. It then merged with Budget Group. Budget sold the company to its founders and management in 2000. In 2014 the company became an ESOP.

It operates 132 locations across North America. Cruise America holds a 52% market-share in US recreational vehicles rental operations market.
