= Auto Europe =

Car rental wholesale company

Auto Europe, LLC.
- Type: Privately held LLC
- Industry: Rental and leasing services
- Founded: 1954
- Headquarters: Portland, Maine, U.S.
- Area served: Worldwide
- Services: Car rental
- Website: www.autoeurope.com

Auto Europe is a car rental wholesale company, working with approximately 24,000 car rental locations in 180 countries in Europe, Asia, Africa, Australia, New Zealand, as well as North and South America. International car rental is the main service sold by Auto Europe. In addition to traditional self-driven rental cars, Auto Europe books luxury and sport vehicles, motorhome and campervan rentals, European Leasing, as well as chauffeur and airport transfer services.

== History ==
Auto Europe was founded in Germany in 1954 by Alex Cecil. The company got its start purchasing cars to rent to U.S. travelers in Europe. Cecil later moved to New York and eventually relocated the company to Maine. In 1997, Alex Cecil retired, passing the reins to current leadership.

In 1995, Auto Europe began offering airfare and hotels under the name Destination Europe. In 2010, they re-branded this division as Fly International.

In 2003, Auto Europe was acquired by private equity firm TowerBrook Capital Partners. Auto Europe was acquired by Court Square Capital Partners in December 2006.

In December 2025, Auto Europe was acquired by Deck2 Capital and a consortium of New York-based credit funds.

As of late 2025 written customer services communication is handled by machines. This results in applications for refunds for services not rendered to not be processed.

== Services ==
=== Car hire ===
Auto Europe collaborates with a number of suppliers including Europcar, Thrifty Car Rental, Avis, Budget, Dollar, Enterprise, Sixt, National Car Rental, Alamo, Buchbinder, Ezi Car Rental, First Car Rental, County Car Rentals, Rhodium and more.

=== European car leasing ===
Auto Europe has partnered with Peugeot Car-2-Europe, Renault Eurodrive, Citroën Car-2-Europe and DS Car-2-Europe to provide another option for long-term car hire in Europe. Those travelling around Europe for 21 to 175 days can travel freely throughout over 40 European countries.

=== Motorhome rental ===
Auto Europe offers motorhome hire in a number of countries with a range of supplies including: Star RV, Jucy, Apollo, Maui, Mighty Campers, Britz, Cruise America, Cruise Canada, Bunk Campers, Anywhere Campers, McRent, Road Bear, Star RV, CanaDream, Just Go, Avis Car-Away and more. Auto Europe services various countries all around the globe including: Australia, New Zealand, the United States, most of Europe, United Kingdom, Ireland, Japan and more.

=== Luxury car hire ===
Auto Europe offers a range of high-end vehicles such as Aston Martin, Audi, Bentley, Ferrari, Lamborghini, Maserati, Mercedes-Benz, Porsche, Range Rover and more to choose from in various locations worldwide.

== Awards ==
Auto Europe has been nominated for numerous World Travel Awards, including Europe's Leading Car Rental Company (2005, 2006, 2007, 2008, 2009, 2010, 2011, 2012), Europe's Leading Business Car Rental Company (2009, 2010, 2011, 2012), and Europe's Leading Chauffeur Company (2013, 2014). In 2014 Auto Europe received its 5th Magellan Award as a silver winner in the Car Rental – Overall Luxury Car Collection category. Most recently, Auto Europe took home a number of awards at the 2019 Magellan Awards in ground transportation. The gold category awards were both the Overall-Luxury Car Collection award and the Car Service – Overall-Worldwide Coverage award.
