= Bangor Band =

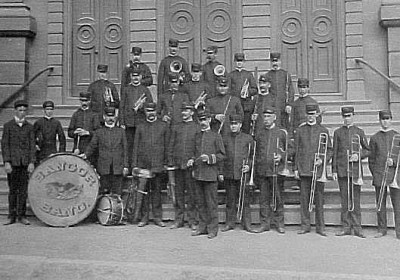
The Bangor Band, Memorial Day 1898.

The Bangor Band is a community band based in Bangor, Maine. Founded in 1859 as the Bangor Cornet Band, it has performed every year since then under directors such as composers Robert Browne Hall and Gordon W. Bowie. Besides their annual Summer Concert Series on the Bangor Waterfront, they perform at other times throughout the year, including the Cole Land Transportation Museum's Veterans Day celebration.
