= 2002 United States Senate election in Maine =

2002 election in Maine, United States

- November 5, 2002
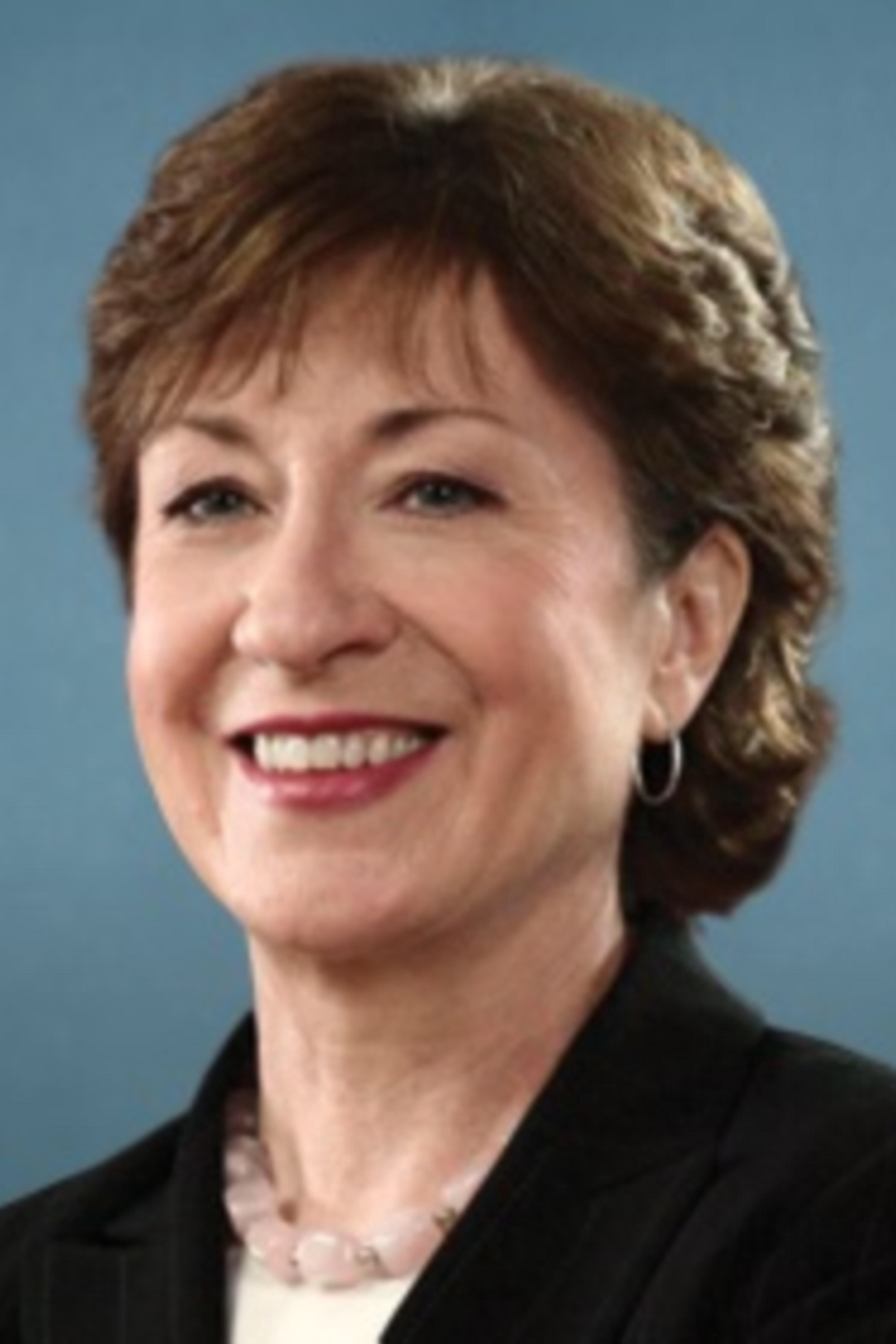

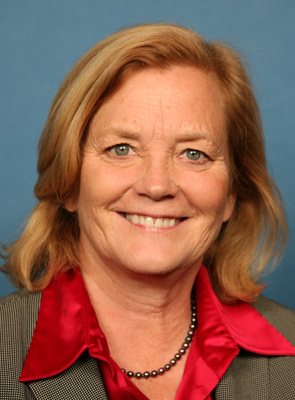
Nominee	Susan Collins	Chellie Pingree
Party	Republican	Democratic
Popular vote	295,041	209,858
Percentage	58.44%	41.56%
- Collins: 40–50% 50–60% 60–70% 70–80% 80–90% >90% Pingree: 40–50% 50–60% 60–70% 70–80% Tie: 50%
U.S. senator before election
Susan Collins
Republican
Elected U.S. Senator
Susan Collins
Republican

The 2002 United States Senate election in Maine was held November 5, 2002. Incumbent Republican U.S. Senator Susan Collins won re-election to a second term.

Along with Oregon and New Mexico, this was one of the three Republican-held Senate seats up for election in a state that Al Gore won in the 2000 presidential election.

== Candidates ==
=== Democratic ===
- Chellie Pingree, State Senator and Senate Majority Leader

=== Republican ===
- Susan Collins, incumbent U.S. Senator since 1997

== General election ==
=== Campaign ===
Pingree attacked Collins for supporting the Bush tax cuts. Both candidates opposed the Iraq War in the fall of 2002. However, Collins then supported the congressional resolution to attack Iraq, while Pingree opposed it.

Collins, a popular moderate, was supported by health care groups, environmentalists and gay rights advocates. She handily defeated Pingree in one of the first U.S. Senate elections in which both major parties nominated women in U.S. history.

=== Debate ===
2002 United States Senate election in Maine debate
No.	Date	Host	Moderator	Link	Republican	Democratic
Key: P Participant A Absent N Not invited I Invited W Withdrawn						
Key: P Participant A Absent N Not invited I Invited W Withdrawn					Susan Collins	Chellie Pingree
1	Oct. 19, 2002	Maine Public	Barbara Cariddi; Charlotte Renner	C-SPAN	P	P

=== Predictions ===
Source	Ranking	As of
Sabato's Crystal Ball	Likely R	November 4, 2002

=== Results ===
General election results
Party	Candidate	Votes	%	±%
Republican	Susan Collins (incumbent)	295,041	58.44%	+9.25%
Democratic	Chellie Pingree	209,858	41.56%	−2.31%
Majority		85,183	16.87%	+11.57%
Turnout		504,899	100.00%	N/A
Republican hold				

==== Results by county ====
County	Susan Collins Republican		Chellie Pingree Democratic		Margin		Total votes cast
County	#	%	#	%	#	%	Total votes cast
Androscoggin	20,095	55.2%	16,312	44.8%	3,783	10.4%	36,407
Aroostook	17,869	68.3%	8,287	31.7%	9,582	36.6%	26,156
Cumberland	64,123	56.1%	50,095	43.9%	14,028	12.2%	114,218
Franklin	6,555	57.9%	4,773	42.1%	1,782	15.8%	11,328
Hancock	13,399	57.5%	9,885	42.5%	3,514	15.0%	23,284
Kennebec	24,724	53.4%	21,615	46.6%	3,109	6.8%	46,339
Knox	8,691	52.6%	7,831	47.4%	860	5.2%	16,522
Lincoln	9,609	59.3%	6,589	40.7%	3,020	18.6%	16,198
Oxford	11,821	57.4%	8,788	42.6%	3,033	14.8%	20,609
Penobscot	35,024	63.1%	20,505	36.9%	14,519	26.2%	55,529
Piscataquis	4,633	65.3%	2,459	34.7%	2,174	30.6%	7,092
Sagadahoc	8,403	56.8%	6,384	43.2%	2,019	13.6%	14,787
Somerset	10,353	57.4%	7,685	42.6%	2,668	14.8%	18,038
Waldo	8,489	57.6%	6,238	42.4%	2,251	15.2%	14,727
Washington	7,697	65.5%	4,050	34.5%	3,647	31.0%	11,747
York	43,556	60.6%	28,362	39.4%	15,194	21.2%	71,918
Totals	295,041	58.4%	209,858	41.6%	85,183	16.8%	504,899

Counties that flipped from Democratic to Republican

- Androscoggin (largest city: Lewiston)
- Cumberland (largest municipality: Portland)
- Kennebec (largest city: Augusta)

== See also ==
- 2002 United States Senate election
