= Jonathan Courtney =

American politician from Maine

Member of the Maine Senate from the 3rd district
- In office 2004–2012
- Succeeded by: John Tuttle

Personal details
- Born: July 16, 1966 (age 60)
- Party: Republican
- Profession: Businessperson

Jonathan Courtney (born July 16, 1966) is an American politician from Maine. Courtney served as a Republican state senator from Maine's 3rd District, representing part of York County including Sanford and his home in Springvale. He was first elected in 2002 to the Maine House of Representatives and served one term. He was elected to the Maine Senate in 2004 was unable to run for re-election due to term limits in 2012. He was the Republican Party's Majority Leader in the State Senate.

Courtney grew up in Wells, Maine and graduated from Marshwood High School in South Berwick, Maine.

In April 2012, after qualifying to run for the Republican nomination, Courtney officially announced his campaign. He won the primary, and faced incumbent Democrat Chellie Pingree in the November 2012 election. He was easily defeated by Pingree in the general election.
