= Cynthia Dill =

American lawyer and politician (born 1965)

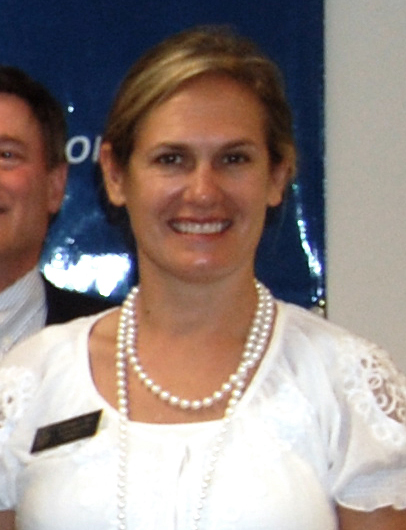
- Dill in 2011

Member of the Maine Senate from the 7th district
- In office May 11, 2011 – December 6, 2012
- Preceded by: Larry Bliss
- Succeeded by: Rebecca Millett

Member of the Maine House of Representatives from the 121st district
- In office December 1, 2006 – May 11, 2011
- Preceded by: Constance Goldman
- Succeeded by: Kim Monaghan-Derrig

Personal details
- Born: January 6, 1965 (age 61) Carmel, New York, U.S.
- Party: Democratic (until 2026)
- Spouse: Tom Clarke
- Education: University of Vermont (BA); Northeastern University (JD)

Cynthia Ann Dill (born January 6, 1965) is an American lawyer and politician from Maine. As the nominee of the Democratic Party, she served in the Maine House of Representatives and Maine Senate, representing the 7th district which is composed of South Portland, her hometown of Cape Elizabeth, and a small portion of Scarborough.

Dill was the 2012 Democratic nominee to replace outgoing senator Olympia Snowe and represent Maine in the United States Senate, but came in third in the general election behind former independent governor Angus King and Republican secretary of state Charlie Summers. In 2026, Dill announced that she had unenrolled from the Democratic Party.

== Early life and career ==
Dill was born in Carmel, New York and received her bachelor's degree from the University of Vermont and her J.D. from Northeastern University School of Law. She participated in legal internships in Brunswick and Augusta before settling in Cape Elizabeth. She is married and has two children.

== Political career ==
=== Cape Elizabeth Town Council ===
==== Tenure ====
While serving on the Cape Elizabeth Town Council, Dill said her priority was to protect and support the state's businesses and natural resources and the elderly, disabled and children. She voted to support gay marriage and said she would "happily and without reservation" support it if the issue would come up again. She strongly supported education, saying, "I am committed to improving the education funding formula and more importantly making needed reforms to education as a whole."

=== Maine House of Representatives ===
==== Elections ====
Dill was first elected to the Maine House of Representatives in 2006 to represent Maine's 121st House District, based in Cape Elizabeth. She defeated Republican nominee Jennifer Duddy 52%-48%. In 2008, she won re-election to a second term with 61% of the vote. In 2010, she won re-election to a third term with 58% of the vote.

==== Committee assignments ====
She served on the Joint Standing Committee on Judiciary and the House Ethics Committees

=== Maine Senate ===
==== Elections ====
Following the resignation of State Senator Larry Bliss in 2011, Dill won a special election to replace Bliss, defeating former Republican state representative Louie Maietta 68%-32%.

==== Tenure ====
Dill is a strong supporter of same-sex marriage. In November 2011, Dill formed a group, "The Friends of the Maine Woods", to support Roxanne Quimby's bid to donate land to create a national park in the Millinocket region of Maine. The town council of Millinocket and the Maine State Legislature passed resolutions opposing the creation of the proposed national park.

==== Committee assignments ====
She served on the Joint Standing Committee on Judiciary.

=== 2012 U.S. Senate election ===
In January 2012, Dill announced that she would seek the Democratic Party's nomination for the U.S. Senate then held by incumbent Republican U.S. Senator Olympia Snowe.

Dill won a four-way Democratic Senate primary on June 12, 2012. She faced Republican Charlie Summers, independent candidates Angus King and Danny Dalton, and Libertarian Party-affiliated independent Andrew Ian Dodge in the November election, in which King was victorious.

== Post-political career ==
In 2013, Dill joined Portland law firm Troubh Heisler.

She served as the attorney for George Loder, a former Maine State Police trooper and whistleblower who successfully sued the force for violating the state's whistleblower protection law and was awarded $300,000 in damages in October 2022.

In September 2025, Dill wrote a letter to the editor published in the Portland Press Herald agreeing with Donald Trump's anti-transgender views, writing "Transsexual people have been around forever and society accepted the deviation from the norm as just that, as it should today, with compassion and protection under the law... Even a broken clock is right twice a day. Donald Trump is right about gender ideology. It doesn't belong in Maine schools." She filed a lawsuit in April 2026 on behalf of a Maine Correctional Center inmate against Maine Department of Corrections Commissioner Randall Liberty and warden Ben Beal for housing a transgender prisoner who allegedly sexually assaulted and harassed other inmates.

In 2026, Dill endorsed Republican U.S. Senator Susan Collins for re-election in an op-ed, and said that she had left the Democratic Party. Collins was defeated for a sixth term.

Party political offices
Preceded by Jean Hay Bright	Democratic nominee for U.S. Senator from Maine (Class 1); 2012	Succeeded by Zak Ringelstein
