= Maine People's Resource Center =

American political education non-profit

Maine People's Resource Center (MPRC) is a liberal 501(c)(3) organization, formed in 1984. Its mission is to teach everyday people the skills necessary to participate in the political process, with the overall mission of advancing progressive policies in Maine. The organization specializes in grassroots organizing, particularly engaging with citizens who have never been involved in the process before. It is affiliated with its sister 501(c)(4) organization, the Maine People's Alliance.

== Public education ==
=== Citizen's Guide ===
For 29 years, the Maine People’s Resource Center (MPRC) has published A Citizen’s Guide to the Maine Legislature, a resource for Mainers to learn about the processes of their state government and the people who represent them in Augusta.

=== Public opinion research ===
Since 2010, MPRC has also conducted extensive public opinion research, though polls of Maine citizens on political issues and campaigns. It has frequently been cited as one of the most accurate pollsters in Maine, though, a conservative Maine newspaper reports that in late 2014 polling analyst Nate Silver gave the MPRC a C-minus rating for accuracy.
