= 2026 United States House of Representatives elections in Maine =

- November 3, 2026

Both Maine seats to the United States House of Representatives
	Majority party	Minority party
Party	Democratic	Republican
Last election	2	0
Seats won	1	1
Seat change	▼1	▲1
Popular vote	415,884	300,507
Percentage	58.05%	41.95%
Swing	▲3.35%	▼0.80%

Democratic hold
Republican gain
Democratic
50–60%
60–70%
70–80%
Republican
40–50%
50–60%
60–70%

The 2026 United States House of Representatives elections in Maine were held on November 3, 2026, to elect the two U.S. representatives from the State of Maine, one from each of the state's congressional districts. These elections coincided with a U.S. Senate election, a gubernatorial election, and various other state, county and local elections. The primary elections took place on June 9, 2026. Both the primaries and general election were conducted with ranked-choice voting. Maine, Montana, and Wisconsin will be the three states with evenly split congressional delegations following the 2026 House of Representatives elections, (1 - 1, 1 - 1, and 4 - 4 respectively.). LePage's election victory in the 2nd congressional district leaves him as the sole Republican member of Congress from New England following the defeat of Susan Collins' statewide Senate re-election bid.

== Statewide polling ==
=== Statewide congressional polls ===
Poll source	Date(s) administered	Sample size (Note: Key: A – all adults RV – registered voters LV – likely voters V – unclear)	Margin of error	Democratic	Republican	Other	Undecided
The New York Times/Siena University	October 27 – November 1, 2026	714 (LV)	± 4.3%	55%	42%	–	3%
The New York Times/Siena University	September 15–22, 2026	619 (LV)	± 4.9%	52%	44%	–	5%
The New York Times/Portland Press-Herald/Siena University	June 19–26, 2026	608 (LV)	± 4.8%	53%	42%	–	5%

== District 1 ==
2026 Maine's 1st congressional district election
- Reporting: 99% as of 11:26 AM, November 12 EST
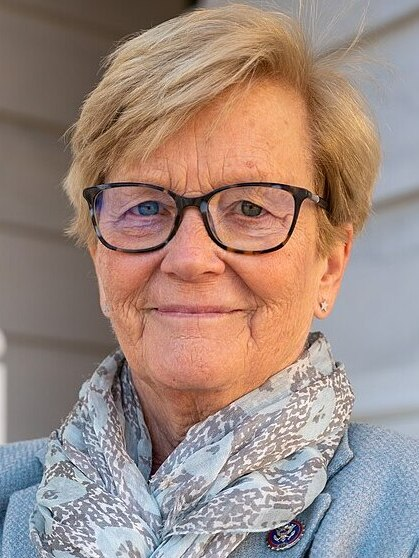

Nominee	Chellie Pingree	Ronald Russell
Party	Democratic	Republican
Popular vote	250,452	129,617
Percentage	65.9%	34.1%
- Municipality results Pingree: 50–60% 60–70% 70–80% 80–90% Russell: 50–60% 60–70%
U.S. Representative before election
Chellie Pingree
Democratic
Elected U.S. Representative
Chellie Pingree
Democratic

The 1st district comprises coastal and southern Maine, including Portland, the largest city in Maine. The incumbent is Democrat Chellie Pingree, who was first elected in 2008. She was most recently re-elected in 2024 with 58.1% of the vote and is seeking re-election to a tenth term. State representative Tiffany Roberts had announced a challenge to Pingree in the Democratic primary, accusing Pingree of being insufficiently bipartisan, however she was unable to collect enough signatures to qualify for the primary ballot.

Republicans Joshua Pietrowicz and Ronald Russell have filed FEC paperwork to run for the 1st district primary election.

=== Democratic primary ===
==== Candidates ====
===== Nominee =====
- Chellie Pingree, incumbent U.S. representative (2009–present)

===== Failed to qualify =====
- Tiffany Roberts, state representative from the 149th district (2018–present)

==== Endorsements ====
Chellie Pingree

Labor unions

- National Education Association

Organizations

- J Street
- League of Conservation Voters Action Fund
- Planned Parenthood Action Fund
- Sierra Club

==== Fundraising ====
Campaign finance reports as of March 31, 2026
Candidate	Raised	Spent	Cash on hand
Chellie Pingree (D)	$336,692	$328,654	$423,716
Tiffany Roberts (D)	$20,051	$14,981	$5,071
Source: Federal Election Commission

==== Results ====
Democratic primary results
Party	Candidate	Votes	%
Democratic	Chellie Pingree (incumbent)	128,257	100.0
Total votes		128,257	100.0

=== Republican primary ===
==== Candidates ====
===== Nominee =====
- Ronald Russell, defense contractor and nominee for this district in 2024

===== Eliminated in primary =====
- Joshua Pietrowicz, sales consultant and candidate for state representative in 2022

===== Withdrawn =====
- Joshua Duprey
- Andrew Piantidosi, tech professional and candidate for this district in 2024
- Eric Small, Sanford police chief (running for state house; endorsed Russell)

==== Fundraising ====
Italics indicate a withdrawn candidate.

Campaign finance reports as of March 31, 2026
Candidate	Raised	Spent	Cash on hand
Joshua Pietrowicz (R)	$500	$0	$500
Ronald Russell (R)	$11,051	$21,833	$3,438
Eric Small (R)	$12,514	$12,514	$0
Source: Federal Election Commission

==== Polling ====
Poll source	Date(s) administered	Sample size	Margin of error	Joshua Pietrowicz	Ronald Russell	Other	Undecided
University of New Hampshire	May 21–25, 2026	209 (LV)	± 6.8%	7%	24%	2% (Note: "Another candidate" with 2%)	68%

==== Results ====
Republican primary results
Party	Candidate	Votes	%
Republican	Ronald Russell	27,059	53.5
Republican	Joshua Pietrowicz	23,485	46.5
Total votes		50,544	100.0

=== General election ===
==== Predictions ====
Source	Ranking	As of
Decision Desk HQ	Safe D	July 14, 2026
The Cook Political Report	Solid D	November 6, 2025
Inside Elections	Solid D	November 5, 2025
Sabato's Crystal Ball	Safe D	November 5, 2025
Silver Bulletin	Solid D	August 20, 2026

==== Post-primary endorsements ====
Chellie Pingree (D)

Labor unions

- Maine AFL-CIO

==== Fundraising ====
Campaign finance reports as of June 30, 2026
Candidate	Raised	Spent	Cash on hand
Chellie Pingree (D)	$429,634	$422,200	$423,112
Ronald Russell (R)	$75,680	$69,878	$20,023
Source: Federal Election Commission

==== Polling ====
Poll source	Date(s) administered	Sample size	Margin of error	Chellie Pingree (D)	Ronald Russell (R)	Other	Undecided
University of New Hampshire	September 17–21, 2026	679 (LV)	± 3.8%	57%	35%	4% (Note: "Another candidate" with 4%)	5%

==== Results ====
2026 Maine's 1st congressional district election
Party	Candidate	Votes	%	±%
Democratic	Chellie Pingree (incumbent)			
Republican	Ronald Russell			
Total votes				

== District 2 ==
2026 Maine's 2nd congressional district election
- Reporting: 98% as of 6:50 PM EST
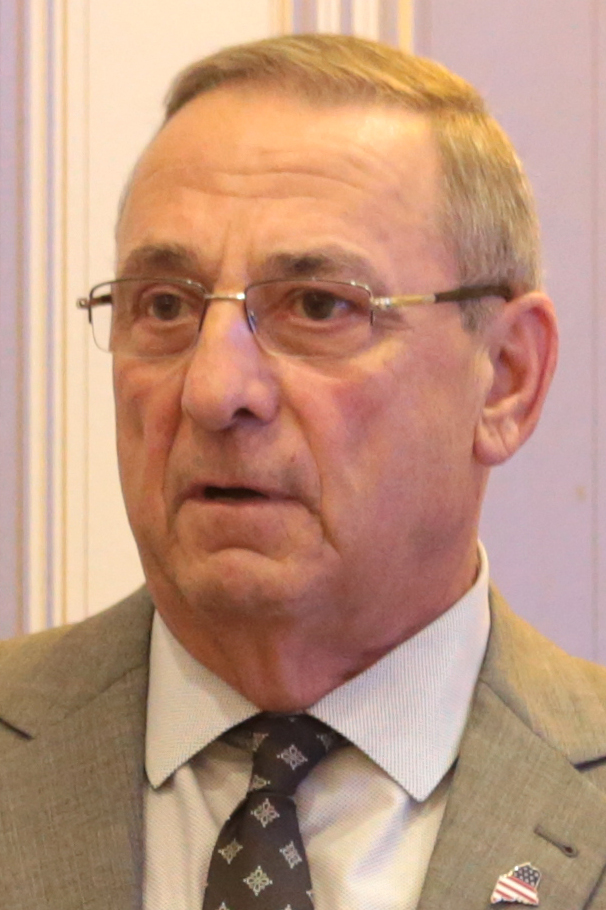

Nominee	Paul LePage	Matthew Dunlap
Party	Republican	Democratic
First round	170,265; 49.89%	164,845; 48.31%
Maximum round	170,890; 50.8%	165,432; 49.2%
- Municipality results LePage: 50–60% 60–70% 70–80% 80–90% 90–100% Dunlap: 50–60% 60–70% 70–80% 80–90% Tie: 50% No votes
U.S. Representative before election
Jared Golden
Democratic
Elected U.S. Representative
Paul LePage
Republican

The 2nd district comprises central and northern Maine and is one of the most rural districts in the United States. It is the largest district by area east of the Mississippi River. Some of the most notable cities in the district include Lewiston and Bangor, the second and third largest cities in Maine, as well as the state capital Augusta. The incumbent is Democrat Jared Golden, who was first elected in 2018 when he narrowly defeated incumbent Republican Bruce Poliquin. He was most recently re-elected in 2024 with 50.3% of the vote and was one of 17 Democratic members of Congress representing districts that Donald Trump carried in 2024. The district voted for Trump by 9.5 percentage points in 2024 while re-electing Golden by less than one percent, making it Trump's widest margin of victory in any of the 13 districts that voted for him while simultaneously electing a Democrat to Congress on the same ballot. Because of this, it is seen as one of the Republican Party's top non-redistricted pickup opportunities. Golden initially sought re-election to a fifth term but withdrew in November 2025.

Maine State Auditor Matthew Dunlap entered the Democratic primary as a challenger to Golden, and has the support of Mike Michaud, who represented this district from 2003 to 2015. Jordan Wood, a Lewiston native and former chief of staff to former California U.S. Representative Katie Porter, initially ran for Maine’s U.S. Senate seat in 2026 but announced that he was switching to the 2nd district race following Golden's withdrawal. Joe Baldacci, younger brother of former Maine governor and former representative for the district John Baldacci, entered the race on January 12, 2026. Baldacci previously ran for the seat in 2016 but withdrew before the primary. Paige Loud, a social worker, also ran as a Democrat.

On the Republican side, former Maine governor from 2011 to 2019 and Republican nominee in the 2022 Maine gubernatorial election Paul LePage announced a campaign for the 2nd district in May 2025. Despite losing the 2022 election by about 13 percentage points, LePage nonetheless narrowly carried the 2nd congressional district by about two points over incumbent Democratic governor Janet Mills.

LePage's residency has been criticized. He has rented an apartment in Augusta from fellow Republican Shawn Moody, but LePage's campaign declined to discuss if he would live there if elected.

In the Democratic primary, no candidate received 50% of the vote, sending the election to a ranked-choice runoff. Dunlap defeated Baldacci in the final round, 52.5%–47.5%.

In the general election, no candidate received 50% of the vote, sending the election to a ranked-choice runoff. On November 5, less than two hours after it was announced that the election would proceed to a ranked-choice voting tabulation, Dunlap conceded defeat to LePage. However, Secretary of State Shenna Bellows maintained that ranked-choice tabulation would still have to be completed in order to have a certified election under state laws. Earlier, on November 4, LePage declared victory. The Associated Press called the race for LePage on November 12, resulting in the only non-redistricted House Republican pickup of the 2026 cycle.

=== Democratic primary ===
==== Candidates ====
===== Nominee =====
- Matthew Dunlap, state auditor of Maine (2021, 2022–present)

===== Eliminated in primary =====
- Joe Baldacci, state senator from the 9th district (2020–present) and brother of former governor and U.S. representative John Baldacci
- Paige Loud, social worker
- Jordan Wood, former chief of staff to U.S. representative Katie Porter (previously ran for U.S. Senate)

===== Withdrawn =====
- Jared Golden, incumbent U.S. representative (2019–present)
- Louis Sigel, former secretary of the Kennebec County Democratic Committee

===== Declined =====
- Troy Jackson, former President of the Maine Senate (2018–2024) and candidate for this district in 2014 (unsuccessfully ran for governor, then ran for U.S. Senate)
- Graham Platner, Sullivan harbor master (ran for U.S. Senate, later withdrew)

==== Endorsements ====
Joe Baldacci

U.S. representatives

- Suzan DelBene, WA-01 (2012–present)
- Barney Frank, former MA-04 (1981–2013) (deceased)

State legislators

- Amy Roeder, state representative from the 23rd district (2020–present) (previously endorsed Dunlap)

Organizations

- DCCC Red to Blue
- Democratic Majority for Israel PAC
Matthew Dunlap

U.S. representatives

- Ro Khanna, CA-17 (2017–present)
- Mike Michaud, former ME-02 (2003–2015)

State legislators

- Kevin O'Connell, former state representative from the 20th district (2020–2024)
- Charles P. Pray, former President of the Maine Senate (1984–1992)
- Laura Supica, state representative from the 22nd district (2020–present)

Labor unions

- National Nurses United

Organizations

- Our Revolution
Paige Loud

Organizations

- College Democrats of America
- Progressive Victory
Jordan Wood

U.S. representatives

- Veronica Escobar, TX-16 (2019–present)
- Katie Porter, former CA-47 (2019–2025)
- Eric Swalwell, CA-14 (2013–2026) (endorsement rejected) (Note: Endorsement was rejected by Wood following allegations of sexual assault against Swalwell.)
- Joe Walsh, former IL-08 (2011–2013) (Note: Walsh held office as a Republican, but joined the Democratic Party in 2025.)
- Robert Garcia, CA-42 (2023–present)
- Raul Ruiz, CA-25 (2013–present)

Local officials

- Carl Sheline, mayor of Lewiston (2022–present)

Organizations

- Brady Campaign
Jared Golden (withdrawn)

Organizations

- AIPAC
- End Citizens United
- Joint Action Committee for Political Affairs
- Reproductive Freedom for All
- Vote Vets
- WelcomePAC
Declined to endorse

U.S. representatives

- Jared Golden, ME-02 (2018–present)

==== Fundraising ====
Campaign finance reports as of March 31, 2026
Candidate	Raised	Spent	Cash on hand
Matthew Dunlap (D)	$628,214	$383,959	$244,255
Jordan Wood (D)	$5,134,288	$4,437,808	$696,480
Joseph Baldacci (D)	$317,060	$168,120	$148,940
Source: Federal Election Commission

==== Polling ====
Poll source	Date(s) administered	Sample size	Margin of error	Joe Baldacci	Matthew Dunlap	Paige Loud	Jordan Wood	Undecided
SurveyUSA (Note: Poll sponsored by the Bangor Daily News and FairVote)	May 28 – June 3, 2026	190 (LV)	± 8.1%	27%	22%	11%	21%	19%
University of New Hampshire	May 21–25, 2026	244 (LV)	± 6.3%	22%	17%	14%	23%	25% (Note: "Another candidate" with 0%)
Pan Atlantic Research (D)	May 8–18, 2026	169 (LV)	–	39%	17%	–	15%	29%
Tulchin Research (D) (Note: Poll commissioned by Dunlap's campaign)	March 5–8, 2026	400 (LV)	± 4.9%	29%	36%	3%	11%	21%
Tulchin Research (D)	March 5–8, 2026	400 (LV)	± 4.9%	43% (Note: Final round in RCV simulation)	57%	–	–	–
Pan Atlantic Research (D)	February 13 – March 2, 2026	144 (LV)	–	36%	14%	–	12%	38%
Pan Atlantic Research (D) (Note: Poll commissioned by Baldacci's campaign.)	November 29 – December 7, 2025	145 (LV)	± 8.4%	42%	10%	–	10%	38%

==== Debate ====
2026 Maine's 2nd congressional district Democratic primary debate
No.	Date	Host	Moderator	Link	Democratic	Democratic	Democratic	Democratic
Key: P Participant A Absent N Not invited I Invited W Withdrawn								
Key: P Participant A Absent N Not invited I Invited W Withdrawn					Joe Baldacci	Matthew Dunlap	Paige Loud	Jordan Wood
1	Apr. 28, 2026	WMTW (TV)	Jon Chrisos	YouTube	P	P	P	P
2	May 29, 2026	Maine Public Broadcasting Network; Portland Press Herald	Jennifer Rooks	YouTube	P	P	P	P

==== Results ====
First round results by town Dunlap: 20–30%; 30–40%; 40–50%; 50–60%; 60–70%; 100%; Baldacci: 30–40%; 40–50%; 50–60%; 60–70%; 70–80%; 100%; Wood: 20–30%; 30–40%; 40–50%; 50–60%; 60–70%; Tie: 20–30%; 30–40%; 40–50%; 50%

Democratic primary results
Party	Candidate	Round 1			Round 2			Round 3	
Party	Candidate	Votes	%	Transfer	Votes	%	Transfer	Votes	%
Democratic	Matthew Dunlap	22,933	29.1	+ 2,748	25,681	33.4	+ 10,243	35,924	52.5
Democratic	Joe Baldacci	24,966	31.7	+ 957	25,923	33.7	+ 6,632	32,555	47.5
Democratic	Jordan Wood	22,712	28.8	+ 2,665	25,377	33.0	25,377	Eliminated	
Democratic	Paige Loud	8,194	10.4	8,194	Eliminated				
Continuing ballots		78,805	100.0		76,981	97.7		68,479	86.9
Exhausted ballots		–		+ 1,824	1,824	2.3	+ 8,502	10,326	13.1
Total votes		78,805	100.0		78,805	100.0		78,805	100.0

=== Republican primary ===
==== Candidates ====
===== Nominee =====
- Paul LePage, former governor of Maine (2011–2019) and nominee for governor in 2022

===== Withdrawn =====
- James Clark, businessman
- Gavin Solomon, businessman from New York

===== Declined =====
- Austin Theriault, former state representative from the 1st district (2022–2024) and nominee for this district in 2024 (endorsed LePage)

==== Endorsements ====
Paul LePage

Executive branch officials

- Donald Trump, president of the United States (2017–2021, 2025–present)

U.S. representatives

- Tom Emmer, House majority whip (2023–present) from MN-06 (2015–present)
- Richard Hudson, NC-09 (2013–present)
- Mike Johnson, speaker of the House (2023–present) from LA-04 (2017–present)
- Steve Scalise, House majority leader (2023–present) from LA-01 (2008–present)

State legislators

- Austin Theriault, former HD-01 (2022–2024) and nominee for this district in 2024

Organizations

- NRCC MAGA Majority

==== Fundraising ====
Campaign finance reports as of March 31, 2026
Candidate	Raised	Spent	Cash on hand
James Clark (R)	$600	$0	$550
Paul LePage (R)	$1,867,594	$532,074	$1,335,520
Source: Federal Election Commission

==== Results ====
Republican primary results
Party	Candidate	Votes	%
Republican	Paul LePage	69,233	100.0
Total votes		69,233	100.0

=== General election ===
==== Predictions ====
Source	Ranking	As of
Decision Desk HQ	Tossup	October 20, 2026
The Cook Political Report	Lean R (flip)	October 9, 2026
Inside Elections	Lean R (flip)	October 15, 2026
Sabato's Crystal Ball	Lean R (flip)	September 29, 2026
Silver Bulletin	Tossup	October 22, 2026

==== Post-primary endorsements ====
Matthew Dunlap (D)

U.S. Senators

- Angus King, Maine (2013–present) (Independent)

U.S. representatives

- Greg Casar, TX-35 (2023–present) and chair of the Congressional Progressive Caucus
- Suzan DelBene, WA-01 (2012–present)
- Maxwell Frost, FL-10 (2023–present)
- Pramila Jayapal, WA-7 (2017–present)

Statewide officials

- Janet Mills, governor of Maine (2019–present)

Labor unions

- American Federation of Government Employees
- Maine AFL-CIO
- Maine Education Association
- National Education Association
- North Atlantic States Regional Council of Carpenters
- United Auto Workers

Organizations

- Congressional Progressive Caucus PAC
- DCCC Red to Blue
- MoveOn
- Planned Parenthood Action Fund
- Sierra Club
Paul LePage (R)

Organizations

- U.S. Chamber of Commerce

==== Fundraising ====
Campaign finance reports as of October 14, 2026
Candidate	Raised	Spent	Cash on hand
Matthew Dunlap (D)	$2,964,964	$2,520,996	$443,968
Paul LePage (R)	$3,299,130	$2,450,906	$848,224
Source: Federal Election Commission

==== Polling ====
Poll source	Date(s) administered	Sample size	Margin of error	Matt Dunlap (D)	Paul LePage (R)	Undecided
Tulchin Research (D)	October 12–14, 2026	500 (LV)	± 4.38%	50%	46%	4%
Tulchin Research (D)	September 27–30, 2026	500 (LV)	± 4.4%	50%	48%	2%
University of New Hampshire	September 17–21, 2026	627 (LV)	± 3.9%	51%	45%	5%
Impact Research (D) (Note: Poll sponsored by the House Majority PAC, which supports Democratic candidates)	September 8–12, 2026	500 (LV)	± 4.4%	49%	49%	2%
DCCC Targeting Team (D)	August 11–13, 2026	621 (LV)	± 3.9%	48%	49%	3%
Tulchin Research (D)	July 11–16, 2026	600 (LV)	± 4.0%	49%	48%	3%
co/efficient (R) (Note: Poll commissioned by the National Republican Congressional Committee.)	April 26–28, 2026	918 (LV)	± 3.2%	40%	50%	10%
University of New Hampshire	February 12–16, 2026	521 (LV)	–	46%	47%	6%
The Mellman Group (D) (Note: Poll commissioned by Golden's campaign.)	June 4–10, 2025	400 (LV)	± 4.9%	37%	47%	16%

Hypothetical polling

Joe Baldacci vs. Paul LePage

Poll source	Date(s) administered	Sample size	Margin of error	Joe Baldacci (D)	Paul LePage (R)	Other	Undecided
Pan Atlantic Research (D)	May 8–18, 2026	418 (LV)	± 3.7%	49%	41%	–	10%
co/efficient (R)	April 26–28, 2026	918 (LV)	± 3.2%	40%	50%	–	10%
University of New Hampshire	February 12–16, 2026	520 (LV)	–	47%	48%	1% (Note: "Another candidate" with 1%)	5%
Pan Atlantic Research (D)	November 29 – December 7, 2025	387 (LV)	± 5.1%	43%	44%	–	13%

Jared Golden vs. Paul LePage

Poll source	Date(s) administered	Sample size	Margin of error	Jared Golden (D)	Paul LePage (R)	Other	Undecided
University of New Hampshire	October 16–21, 2025	546 (LV)	–	44%	49%	3%	3%
University of New Hampshire	June 19–23, 2025	394 (V)	± 4.9%	47%	50%	2%	1%
The Mellman Group (D)	June 4–10, 2025	400 (LV)	± 4.9%	44%	43%	–	12%
Ragnar Research Partners (R) (Note: Poll commissioned by the Congressional Leadership Fund.)	April 13–15, 2025	400 (LV)	± 4.9%	43%	48%	–	9%

Jordan Wood vs. Paul LePage

Poll source	Date(s) administered	Sample size	Margin of error	Jordan Wood (D)	Paul LePage (R)	Other	Undecided
Upswing Research (D) (Note: Poll commissioned by Wood's campaign.)	February 24–27, 2026	403 (LV)	± 4.9%	45%	52%	–	3%
University of New Hampshire	February 12–16, 2026	521 (LV)	–	44%	48%	2%	6%

Generic Democrat vs. generic Republican

Poll source	Date(s) administered	Sample size	Margin of error	Generic Democrat	Generic Republican	Undecided
Impact Research (D)	September 8–12, 2026	500 (LV)	± 4.4%	45%	49%	6%
co/efficient (R)	April 26–28, 2026	918 (LV)	± 3.2%	41%	48%	11%
Ragnar Research Partners (R)	April 13–15, 2025	400 (LV)	± 4.9%	38%	47%	9%

==== Results ====
2026 Maine's 2nd congressional district election
Party	Candidate	Votes	%	±%
Democratic	Matthew Dunlap			
Republican	Paul LePage			
Total votes				

== Notes ==
Partisan clients
