= Maine's 2nd congressional district =

U.S. House district for Maine

- Interactive map of district boundaries since January 3, 2023
- Representative: Jared Golden; D–Lewiston
- Distribution: 72.11% rural; 27.89% urban
- Population (2025): 705,938
- Median household income: $69,968
- Ethnicity: 90.9% White; 4.0% Two or more races; 1.7% Hispanic; 1.5% Black; 0.8% Asian; 0.8% Native American; 0.3% other
- Cook PVI: R+4

Maine's 2nd congressional district is a congressional district in the U.S. state of Maine. Covering 27,326 square miles (70,770 km^{2}), it comprises nearly 92% of the state's total land area. The district comprises most of the land area north of the Portland and Augusta metropolitan areas. It includes the cities of Lewiston, Bangor, Auburn, and Presque Isle. The district is represented by Democrat Jared Golden, who took office in 2019.

It is the largest district by area east of the Mississippi River, and the 24th largest overall. It is the second-most rural district in the United States, with 72% of its population in rural areas, and it has the second-highest proportion of non-Hispanic White residents (90.9%); only Kentucky's 5th congressional district exceeds it in the two categories.

With a Cook PVI of R+4, it is the most Republican-leaning district with a Democratic representative in the United States. It voted for Republican Donald Trump in 2016, 2020, and 2024 and notably voted for Democratic Representative Jared Golden in both the 2020 and 2024 elections. It was one of six congressional districts in 2020 and 13 districts in 2024 that voted for Donald Trump for president while simultaneously electing a Democrat to the House of Representatives.

== History ==
Until the Missouri Compromise was reached in 1820, Maine was a part of Massachusetts as the District of Maine. When it became a state in 1820, Maine had seven congressional districts credited to it (Massachusetts including Maine had been given 20 districts after the 1810 census). Since Maine became a state, all but two districts have been reallocated to other states.

In 2018, the district became the first in the United States to elect the ranked choice winner over the first-past-the-post winner, after a referendum in 2016 changed Maine's electoral system from the latter system to the former. Incumbent representative Bruce Poliquin won a plurality of the first preference votes. However, the second and third preferences from two independent candidates flowed overwhelmingly to Jared Golden, allowing him to win with 50.6% of the vote once all preferences were distributed.

Historically, the district has tended to keep its incumbents regardless of party. When Golden defeated two-term Republican incumbent Bruce Poliquin in 2018, it was the first time an incumbent had lost reelection in the district since 1916. Since 1965, the district's representatives have frequently sought statewide office. Three U.S. senators (Democrat William Hathaway and Republicans William Cohen and Olympia Snowe), one governor (Democrat John Baldacci), and one nominee for governor (Democrat Mike Michaud) all previously held the seat. Due to its size, the district's congressman is usually reckoned as a statewide figure; its footprint includes portions of all three television markets anchored in the state.

The boundaries of the district are open for reconsideration in light of population shifts revealed by the decennial US census. Until 2011, Maine's constitution provided for the state to reapportion the congressional districts based on census data every ten years beginning in 1983, meaning that Maine redrew their districts after most states, who typically redraw them in time for the congressional election taking place immediately after the release of census data. However, a federal lawsuit filed in March 2011 led to a requirement that Maine speed up its redistricting process. As such, Maine's congressional map was redrawn in time for both the 2012 and 2022 congressional elections.

== Composition ==
For the 118th and successive Congresses (based on redistricting following the 2020 census), the district contains all or portions of the following counties and municipalities:

Androscoggin County (14)
All 14 municipalities

Aroostook County (64)
All 64 municipalities

Franklin County (21)
All 21 municipalities

Hancock County (37)
All 37 municipalities

Kennebec County (18)
Augusta, Belgrade, Chelsea, Farmingdale, Fayette, Gardiner, Hallowell, Manchester, Monmouth, Mount Vernon, Oakland, Randolph, Readfield, Rome, Sidney, Vienna, Wayne, Winthrop

Oxford County (36)
All 36 municipalities

Penobscot County (59)
All 59 municipalities

Piscataquis County (18)
All 18 municipalities

Somerset County (33)
All 33 municipalities

Waldo County (26)
All 26 municipalities

Washington County (44)
All 44 municipalities

== Recent election results from statewide races ==
In US presidential elections, most states give all the state's electoral votes to the candidate that wins the statewide popular vote. This is a type of winner-takes-all voting. Maine and Nebraska instead use the congressional district method, where the winner in each of the state's congressional districts gets one electoral vote, and the statewide winner gets an additional two electoral votes. Since Maine introduced this system in 1969, Maine's second district voted the same way as the entire state of Maine for every election until 2016. Republican Donald Trump won the district in 2016, 2020, and 2024.

Year	Office	Results
2008	President	Obama 54% - 43%
2008	Senate	Collins 65% - 35%
2012	President	Obama 55% - 45%
2012	Senate	King 49% - 34%
2014	Senate	Collins 71% - 29%
2014	Governor	LePage 49% - 43%
2016	President	Trump 51% - 41%
2018	Senate	King 51% - 40%
2018	Governor	Moody 48% - 46%
2020	President	Trump 52% - 45%
2020	Senate	Collins 58% - 35%
2022	Governor	LePage 50% - 48%
2024	President	Trump 54% - 44%
2024	Senate	King 49% - 40%
2026	Senate	Collins 55% - 44%
2026	Governor	Charles 46% - 45%

== List of members representing the district ==
Member	Party	Years ↑	Cong ress	Electoral history	District location
District created March 4, 1821
Ezekiel Whitman (Portland)	Federalist	March 4, 1821 – June 1, 1822	17th	Redistricted from the Massachusetts's 15th district and re-elected in 1820. Resigned.	1821–1823; Cumberland County: Brunswick, Cape Elizabeth, Danville, Durham, Falmouth, Freeport, Gorham, Gray, Harpswell, New Gloucester, North Yarmouth, Portland, Pownal, Scarborough, Westbrook, Windham
Vacant		June 1, 1822 – December 2, 1822	17th		1821–1823; Cumberland County: Brunswick, Cape Elizabeth, Danville, Durham, Falmouth, Freeport, Gorham, Gray, Harpswell, New Gloucester, North Yarmouth, Portland, Pownal, Scarborough, Westbrook, Windham
Mark Harris (Portland)	Democratic-Republican	December 2, 1822 – March 3, 1823	17th	Elected to finish Whitman's term. Retired.	1821–1823; Cumberland County: Brunswick, Cape Elizabeth, Danville, Durham, Falmouth, Freeport, Gorham, Gray, Harpswell, New Gloucester, North Yarmouth, Portland, Pownal, Scarborough, Westbrook, Windham
Stephen Longfellow (Portland)	Adams-Clay; Federalist	March 4, 1823 – March 3, 1825	18th	Elected in 1823. Lost re-election.	1823–1833; Cumberland County: Brunswick, Cape Elizabeth, Cumberland, Danville, Durham, Falmouth, Freeport, Gorham, Gray, Harpswell, New Gloucester, North Yarmouth, Poland, Portland, Pownal, Raymond, Scarborough, Standish, Westbrook, Windham
John Anderson (Portland)	Jacksonian	March 4, 1825 – March 3, 1833	19th 20th 21st 22nd	Elected in 1824. Re-elected in 1826. Re-elected in 1828. Re-elected in 1830. Retired to run for Mayor of Portland.	1823–1833; Cumberland County: Brunswick, Cape Elizabeth, Cumberland, Danville, Durham, Falmouth, Freeport, Gorham, Gray, Harpswell, New Gloucester, North Yarmouth, Poland, Portland, Pownal, Raymond, Scarborough, Standish, Westbrook, Windham
Francis Smith (Portland)	Jacksonian	March 4, 1833 – March 3, 1837	23rd 24th 25th	Elected in 1833. Re-elected in 1834. Re-elected in 1836. Lost re-election.	1833–1843 [data missing]
Francis Smith (Portland)	Democratic	March 4, 1837 – March 3, 1839	23rd 24th 25th	Elected in 1833. Re-elected in 1834. Re-elected in 1836. Lost re-election.	1833–1843 [data missing]
Albert Smith (Portland)	Democratic	March 4, 1839 – March 3, 1841	26th	Elected in 1838. Lost re-election.	1833–1843 [data missing]
William Pitt Fessenden (Portland)	Whig	March 4, 1841 – March 3, 1843	27th	Elected in 1840. Retired.	1833–1843 [data missing]
Robert P. Dunlap (Brunswick)	Democratic	March 4, 1843 – March 3, 1847	28th 29th	Elected in 1843. Re-elected in 1844. Retired.	1843–1853 [data missing]
Asa Clapp (Portland)	Democratic	March 4, 1847 – March 3, 1849	30th	Elected in 1846. Retired.	1843–1853 [data missing]
Nathaniel Littlefield (Bridgeton)	Democratic	March 4, 1849 – March 3, 1851	31st	Elected in 1848. Retired.	1843–1853 [data missing]
John Appleton (Portland)	Democratic	March 4, 1851 – March 3, 1853	32nd	Elected in 1850. Retired.	1843–1853 [data missing]
Samuel Mayall (Gray)	Democratic	March 4, 1853 – March 3, 1855	33rd	Elected in 1852. Retired.	1853–1863 [data missing]
John J. Perry (Oxford)	Opposition	March 4, 1855 – March 3, 1857	34th	Elected in 1854. Retired.	1853–1863 [data missing]
Charles J. Gilman (Brunswick)	Republican	March 4, 1857 – March 3, 1859	35th	Elected in 1856. Retired.	1853–1863 [data missing]
John J. Perry (Oxford)	Republican	March 4, 1859 – March 3, 1861	36th	Elected in 1858. Retired.	1853–1863 [data missing]
Charles W. Walton (Auburn)	Republican	March 4, 1861 – May 26, 1862	37th	Elected in 1860. Resigned on appointment as associate justice of Maine Supreme Judicial Court.	1853–1863 [data missing]
Vacant		May 26, 1862 – December 1, 1862	37th		1853–1863 [data missing]
Thomas Fessenden (Auburn)	Republican	December 1, 1862 – March 3, 1863	37th	Elected to finish Walton's term. Retired.	1853–1863 [data missing]
Sidney Perham (Paris)	Republican	March 4, 1863 – March 3, 1869	38th 39th 40th	Elected in 1862. Re-elected in 1864. Re-elected in 1866. Retired.	1863–1873 [data missing]
Samuel P. Morrill (Farmington)	Republican	March 4, 1869 – March 3, 1871	41st	Elected in 1868. Lost renomination.	1863–1873 [data missing]
William P. Frye (Lewiston)	Republican	March 4, 1871 – March 17, 1881	42nd 43rd 44th 45th 46th 47th	Elected in 1870. Re-elected in 1872. Re-elected in 1874. Re-elected in 1876. Re-elected in 1878. Re-elected in 1880. Resigned when elected U.S. senator.	1863–1873 [data missing]
William P. Frye (Lewiston)	Republican	March 4, 1871 – March 17, 1881	42nd 43rd 44th 45th 46th 47th	Elected in 1870. Re-elected in 1872. Re-elected in 1874. Re-elected in 1876. Re-elected in 1878. Re-elected in 1880. Resigned when elected U.S. senator.	1873–1883 [data missing]
Vacant		March 17, 1881 – September 12, 1881	47th		1873–1883 [data missing]
Nelson Dingley Jr. (Lewiston)	Republican	September 12, 1881 – March 3, 1883	47th	Elected to finish Frye's term. Redistricted to the At-large district.	1873–1883 [data missing]
District inactive		March 3, 1883 – March 3, 1885	48th	At-large districts used	
Nelson Dingley Jr. (Lewiston)	Republican	March 3, 1885 – January 13, 1899	49th 50th 51st 52nd 53rd 54th 55th	Redistricted from the At-large district and re-elected in 1884. Re-elected in 1886. Re-elected in 1888. Re-elected in 1890. Re-elected in 1892. Re-elected in 1894. Re-elected in 1896. Re-elected in 1898 but died before next term.	1885–1893 [data missing]
Nelson Dingley Jr. (Lewiston)	Republican	March 3, 1885 – January 13, 1899	49th 50th 51st 52nd 53rd 54th 55th	Redistricted from the At-large district and re-elected in 1884. Re-elected in 1886. Re-elected in 1888. Re-elected in 1890. Re-elected in 1892. Re-elected in 1894. Re-elected in 1896. Re-elected in 1898 but died before next term.	1893–1903 [data missing]
Vacant		January 13, 1899 – June 19, 1899	55th 56th		1893–1903 [data missing]
Charles E. Littlefield (Rockland)	Republican	June 19, 1899 – September 30, 1908	56th 57th 58th 59th 60th	Elected to finish Dingley's term. Re-elected in 1900. Re-elected in 1902. Re-elected in 1904. Re-elected in 1906. Resigned.	1893–1903 [data missing]
Charles E. Littlefield (Rockland)	Republican	June 19, 1899 – September 30, 1908	56th 57th 58th 59th 60th	Elected to finish Dingley's term. Re-elected in 1900. Re-elected in 1902. Re-elected in 1904. Re-elected in 1906. Resigned.	1903–1913 [data missing]
Vacant		September 30, 1908 – November 3, 1908	60th		1903–1913 [data missing]
John P. Swasey (Canton)	Republican	November 3, 1908 – March 3, 1911	60th 61st	Elected to finish Littlefield's term. Also elected to the next full term. Lost re-election.	1903–1913 [data missing]
Daniel J. McGillicuddy (Lewiston)	Democratic	March 4, 1911 – March 3, 1917	62nd 63rd 64th	Elected in 1910. Re-elected in 1912. Re-elected in 1914. Lost re-election.	1903–1913 [data missing]
Daniel J. McGillicuddy (Lewiston)	Democratic	March 4, 1911 – March 3, 1917	62nd 63rd 64th	Elected in 1910. Re-elected in 1912. Re-elected in 1914. Lost re-election.	1913–1923 [data missing]
Wallace H. White Jr. (Lewiston)	Republican	March 4, 1917 – March 3, 1931	65th 66th 67th 68th 69th 70th 71st	Elected in 1916. Re-elected in 1918. Re-elected in 1920. Re-elected in 1922. Re-elected in 1924. Re-elected in 1926. Re-elected in 1928. Retired to run for U.S. Senator.	1913–1923 [data missing]
Wallace H. White Jr. (Lewiston)	Republican	March 4, 1917 – March 3, 1931	65th 66th 67th 68th 69th 70th 71st	Elected in 1916. Re-elected in 1918. Re-elected in 1920. Re-elected in 1922. Re-elected in 1924. Re-elected in 1926. Re-elected in 1928. Retired to run for U.S. Senator.	1923–1933 [data missing]
Donald B. Partridge (Norway)	Republican	March 4, 1931 – March 3, 1933	72nd	Elected in 1930. Retired.	1923–1933 [data missing]
Edward C. Moran Jr. (Rockland)	Democratic	March 4, 1933 – January 3, 1937	73rd 74th	Elected in 1932. Re-elected in 1934. Retired.	1933–1943 [data missing]
Clyde H. Smith (Skowhegan)	Republican	January 3, 1937 – April 8, 1940	75th 76th	Elected in 1936. Re-elected in 1938. Died.	1933–1943 [data missing]
Vacant		April 8, 1940 – June 3, 1940	76th		1933–1943 [data missing]
Margaret Chase Smith (Skowhegan)	Republican	June 3, 1940 – January 3, 1949	76th 77th 78th 79th 80th	Elected to finish her husband's term. Re-elected in 1940. Re-elected in 1942. Re-elected in 1944. Re-elected in 1946. Retired to run for U.S. Senator.	1933–1943 [data missing]
Margaret Chase Smith (Skowhegan)	Republican	June 3, 1940 – January 3, 1949	76th 77th 78th 79th 80th	Elected to finish her husband's term. Re-elected in 1940. Re-elected in 1942. Re-elected in 1944. Re-elected in 1946. Retired to run for U.S. Senator.	1943–1953 [data missing]
Charles P. Nelson (Waterville)	Republican	January 3, 1949 – January 3, 1957	81st 82nd 83rd 84th	Elected in 1948. Re-elected in 1950. Re-elected in 1952. Re-elected in 1954. Retired.	1943–1953 [data missing]
Charles P. Nelson (Waterville)	Republican	January 3, 1949 – January 3, 1957	81st 82nd 83rd 84th	Elected in 1948. Re-elected in 1950. Re-elected in 1952. Re-elected in 1954. Retired.	1953–1963 [data missing]
Frank M. Coffin (Lewiston)	Democratic	January 3, 1957 – January 3, 1961	85th 86th	Elected in 1956. Re-elected in 1958. Retired to run for governor.	1953–1963 [data missing]
Stanley R. Tupper (Boothbay Harbor)	Republican	January 3, 1961 – January 3, 1963	87th	Elected in 1960. Redistricted to the 1st district.	1953–1963 [data missing]
Clifford G. McIntire (Perham)	Republican	January 3, 1963 – January 3, 1965	88th	Redistricted from the 3rd district and re-elected in 1962. Retired to run for U.S. Senator.	1963–1973 [data missing]
William Hathaway (Auburn)	Democratic	January 3, 1965 – January 3, 1973	89th 90th 91st 92nd	Elected in 1964. Re-elected in 1966. Re-elected in 1968. Re-elected in 1970. Retired to run for U.S. Senator.	1963–1973 [data missing]
William Cohen (Bangor)	Republican	January 3, 1973 – January 3, 1979	93rd 94th 95th	Elected in 1972. Re-elected in 1974. Re-elected in 1976. Retired to run for U.S. Senator.	1973–1983 [data missing]
Olympia Snowe (Auburn)	Republican	January 3, 1979 – January 3, 1995	96th 97th 98th 99th 100th 101st 102nd 103rd	Elected in 1978. Re-elected in 1980. Re-elected in 1982. Re-elected in 1984. Re-elected in 1986. Re-elected in 1988. Re-elected in 1990. Re-elected in 1992. Retired to run for U.S. Senator.	1973–1983 [data missing]
Olympia Snowe (Auburn)	Republican	January 3, 1979 – January 3, 1995	96th 97th 98th 99th 100th 101st 102nd 103rd	Elected in 1978. Re-elected in 1980. Re-elected in 1982. Re-elected in 1984. Re-elected in 1986. Re-elected in 1988. Re-elected in 1990. Re-elected in 1992. Retired to run for U.S. Senator.	1983–1993 [data missing]
Olympia Snowe (Auburn)	Republican	January 3, 1979 – January 3, 1995	96th 97th 98th 99th 100th 101st 102nd 103rd	Elected in 1978. Re-elected in 1980. Re-elected in 1982. Re-elected in 1984. Re-elected in 1986. Re-elected in 1988. Re-elected in 1990. Re-elected in 1992. Retired to run for U.S. Senator.	1993–2003 [data missing]
John Baldacci (Bangor)	Democratic	January 3, 1995 – January 3, 2003	104th 105th 106th 107th	Elected in 1994. Re-elected in 1996. Re-elected in 1998. Re-elected in 2000. Retired to run for governor.	1993–2003 [data missing]
Mike Michaud (East Millinocket)	Democratic	January 3, 2003 – January 3, 2015	108th 109th 110th 111th 112th 113th	Elected in 2002. Re-elected in 2004. Re-elected in 2006. Re-elected in 2008. Re-elected in 2010. Re-elected in 2012. Retired to run for governor.	2003–2013 Androscoggin County; Aroostook County; Franklin County; Hancock County; Oxford County; Penobscot County; Piscataquis County; Somerset County; Waldo County; Washington County; and part of Kennebec County: Benton, Clinton, Fayette, Litchfield, Oakland, Waterville, Wayne, and Winslow
Mike Michaud (East Millinocket)	Democratic	January 3, 2003 – January 3, 2015	108th 109th 110th 111th 112th 113th	Elected in 2002. Re-elected in 2004. Re-elected in 2006. Re-elected in 2008. Re-elected in 2010. Re-elected in 2012. Retired to run for governor.	2013–2023
Bruce Poliquin (Oakland)	Republican	January 3, 2015 – January 3, 2019	114th 115th	Elected in 2014. Re-elected in 2016. Lost re-election.	2013–2023
Jared Golden (Lewiston)	Democratic	January 3, 2019 – present	116th 117th 118th 119th	Elected in 2018. Re-elected in 2020. Re-elected in 2022. Re-elected in 2024. Retiring at the end of term.	2013–2023
Jared Golden (Lewiston)	Democratic	January 3, 2019 – present	116th 117th 118th 119th	Elected in 2018. Re-elected in 2020. Re-elected in 2022. Re-elected in 2024. Retiring at the end of term.	since 2023
Paul LePage (Augusta)	Republican	Assuming office on January 3, 2027		Elected in 2026.	since 2023

== Election history ==
=== 1978 ===
1978 United States House of Representatives elections in Maine: Maine's 2nd congressional district
Party	Candidate	Votes	%
Republican	Olympia Snowe	87,939	50.82
Democratic	Markham L. Gartley	70,691	40.85
Independent	Frederick W. Whittaker	8,035	4.64
Independent	Eddie Shurtleff	1,923	1.11
Independent	Robert H. Burmeister	1,653	0.96
Independent	Margaret E. Cousins	1,573	0.91
Independent	Robert L. Cousins	1,223	0.71
Majority		17,248	9.97
Turnout		173,037	
Republican hold			

=== 1980 ===
1980 United States House of Representatives elections in Maine: Maine's 2nd congressional district
Party	Candidate	Votes	%
Republican	Olympia Snowe (Incumbent)	186,406	78.51
Democratic	Harold L. Silverman	51,026	21.49
Majority		135,380	57.02
Turnout		237,612	
Republican hold			

=== 1982 ===
1982 United States House of Representatives elections in Maine: Maine's 2nd congressional district
Party	Candidate	Votes	%
Republican	Olympia Snowe (Incumbent)	136,075	66.65
Democratic	James P. Dunleavy	68,086	33.35
Majority		67,989	33.30
Turnout		204,161	
Republican hold			

=== 1984 ===
1984 United States House of Representatives elections in Maine: Maine's 2nd congressional district
Party	Candidate	Votes	%
Republican	Olympia Snowe (Incumbent)	192,166	75.73
Democratic	Chipman C. Bull	57,347	22.60
Constitution	Kenneth E. Stoddard	4,242	1.67
Majority		134,819	53.13
Turnout		253,755	
Republican hold			

=== 1986 ===
1986 United States House of Representatives elections in Maine: Maine's 2nd congressional district
Party	Candidate	Votes	%
Republican	Olympia Snowe (Incumbent)	148,770	77.33
Democratic	Kenneth P. Hayes	43,614	22.67
Majority		105,156	54.66
Turnout		192,384	
Republican hold			

=== 1988 ===
1988 United States House of Representatives elections in Maine: Maine's 2nd congressional district
Party	Candidate	Votes	%
Republican	Olympia Snowe (Incumbent)	167,226	66.21
Democratic	Kenneth P. Hayes	85,346	33.79
Majority		81,880	32.42
Turnout		252,572	
Republican hold			

=== 1990 ===
1990 United States House of Representatives elections in Maine: Maine's 2nd congressional district
Party	Candidate	Votes	%
Republican	Olympia Snowe (Incumbent)	121,704	51.02
Democratic	Patrick K. McGowan	116,798	48.97
	write-ins	20	0.01
Majority		4,906	2.06
Turnout		238,522	
Republican hold			

=== 1992 ===
1992 United States House of Representatives elections in Maine: Maine's 2nd congressional district
Party	Candidate	Votes	%
Republican	Olympia Snowe (Incumbent)	153,022	49.13
Democratic	Patrick K. McGowan	130,824	42.01
Green	Jonathan Carter	27,526	8.84
	write-ins	61	0.02
Majority		22,198	7.13
Turnout		311,433	
Republican hold			

=== 1994 ===
1994 United States House of Representatives elections in Maine: Maine's 2nd congressional district
Party	Candidate	Votes	%
Democratic	John Baldacci	109,615	45.69
Republican	Rick Bennett	97,754	40.75
Independent	John M. Michael	21,117	8.80
Green	Charles Fitzgerald	11,353	4.73
	write-ins	55	0.02
Majority		11,861	4.94
Turnout		239,894	
Democratic gain from Republican			

=== 1996 ===
1996 United States House of Representatives elections in Maine: Maine's 2nd congressional district
Party	Candidate	Votes	%
Democratic	John Baldacci (Incumbent)	205,439	71.92
Republican	Paul R. Young	70,856	24.81
Independent	Aldric Saucier	9,294	3.25
	write-ins	47	0.02
Majority		134,583	47.12
Turnout		285,636	
Democratic hold			

=== 1998 ===
1998 United States House of Representatives elections in Maine: Maine's 2nd congressional district
Party	Candidate	Votes	%
Democratic	John Baldacci (Incumbent)	146,202	76.20
Republican	Jonathan Reisman	45,674	23.80
Majority		100,528	52.39
Turnout		191,876	
Democratic hold			

=== 2000 ===
2000 United States House of Representatives elections in Maine: Maine's 2nd congressional district
Party	Candidate	Votes	%
Democratic	John Baldacci (Incumbent)	219,783	73.43
Republican	Richard H. Campbell	79,522	26.57
Majority		140,261	46.86
Turnout		299,305	
Democratic hold			

=== 2002 ===
2002 United States House of Representatives elections in Maine: Maine's 2nd congressional district:
Party	Candidate	Votes	%
Democratic	Mike Michaud	116,868	52.01
Republican	Kevin Raye	107,849	47.99
Total votes		224,717	100.00
Turnout			
Democratic hold			

=== 2004 ===
2004 United States House of Representatives elections in Maine: Maine's 2nd congressional district
Party	Candidate	Votes	%
Democratic	Mike Michaud (incumbent)	199,303	58.03
Republican	Brian Hamel	135,547	39.47
Socialist Equality	Carl Cooley	8,586	2.50
Total votes		343,436	100.00
Turnout			
Democratic hold			

=== 2006 ===
2006 United States House of Representatives elections in Maine: Maine's 2nd congressional district
Party	Candidate	Votes	%
Democratic	Mike Michaud (incumbent)	179,772	70.52
Republican	Laurence D'Amboise	75,156	29.48
Total votes		254,928	100.00
Turnout			
Democratic hold			

=== 2008 ===
2008 United States House of Representatives elections in Maine: Maine's 2nd congressional district
Party	Candidate	Votes	%
Democratic	Mike Michaud (incumbent)	226,274	67.44
Republican	John Frary	109,268	32.57
Total votes		335,542	100.00
Turnout			
Democratic hold			

=== 2010 ===
2010 United States House of Representatives elections in Maine: Maine's 2nd congressional district
Party	Candidate	Votes	%
Democratic	Mike Michaud (incumbent)	147,042	55.13
Republican	Jason J. Levesque	119,669	44.87
Total votes		266,711	100.00
Turnout			
Democratic hold			

=== 2012 ===
2012 United States House of Representatives elections in Maine: Maine's 2nd congressional district
Party	Candidate	Votes	%
Democratic	Mike Michaud (incumbent)	191,456	58.2
Republican	Kevin Raye	137,542	41.8
Total votes		328,998	100.0
Turnout			
Democratic hold			

=== 2014 ===
2014 United States House of Representatives elections in Maine: Maine's 2nd congressional district
Party	Candidate	Votes	%
Republican	Bruce Poliquin	133,320	47.03
Democratic	Emily Ann Cain	118,568	41.83
Independent	Blaine Richardson	31,337	11.05
Others		248	0.09
Total votes		283,473	100
Turnout			
Republican gain from Democratic			

=== 2016 ===
2016 United States House of Representatives elections in Maine: Maine's 2nd congressional district
Party	Candidate	Votes	%
Republican	Bruce Poliquin (incumbent)	192,878	54.77
Democratic	Emily Cain	159,081	45.17
Libertarian	Jay Parker Dresser (Declared Write-In)	224	0.06
	Blank ballots	12,703	N/A
Total votes		364,886	100
Republican hold			

=== 2018 ===
2018 United States House of Representatives elections in Maine: Maine's 2nd congressional district (IRV) (Note: The 2018 election was the first to use instant-runoff voting as opposed to plurality voting since the district's creation.)
Party	Candidate	Votes	%
Republican	Bruce Poliquin (incumbent)	134,184	46.33
Democratic	Jared Golden	132,013	45.58
Independent	Tiffany L. Bond	16,552	5.71
Independent	William R.S. Hoar	6,875	2.37
	Exhausted ballots (not included in total)	6,453	N/A
Total votes		289,624	100
Democratic	Jared Golden	142,440	50.62
Republican	Bruce Poliquin (incumbent)	138,931	49.38
Democratic gain from Republican			

=== 2020 ===
2020 United States House of Representatives elections in Maine: Maine's 2nd congressional district
Party	Candidate	Votes	%
Democratic	Jared Golden (incumbent)	197,974	53.0
Republican	Dale Crafts	175,228	46.9
Write-in		33	0.0
Total votes		373,235	100.0
Democratic hold			

=== 2022 ===
2022 United States House of Representatives elections in Maine: Maine's 2nd congressional district (IRV)
Party	Candidate	Votes	%
Democratic	Jared Golden (incumbent)	153,074	48.38
Republican	Bruce Poliquin	141,260	44.65
Independent	Tiffany L. Bond	21,655	6.84
Write-in		393	0.12
Total votes		316,382	100
Democratic	Jared Golden (incumbent)	165,136	53.05
Republican	Bruce Poliquin	146,142	46.95
Democratic hold			

=== 2024 ===
2024 United States House of Representatives elections in Maine:
Party	Candidate	Votes	%
Democratic	Jared Golden (incumbent)	197,151	50.35
Republican	Austin Theriault	194,445	49.65
Total votes		391,596	100.00
Democratic hold			

== See also ==
- Maine's congressional districts
- List of United States congressional districts
