= 2024 United States House of Representatives elections in Maine =

- November 5, 2024

Both Maine seats to the United States House of Representatives
| | Majority party | Minority party |
|---|---|---|
| Party | Democratic | Republican |
| Last election | 2 | 0 |
| Seats won | 2 | 0 |
| Seat change | Steady | Steady |
| Popular vote | 446,949 | 349,294 |
| Percentage | 54.70% | 42.75% |
| Swing | ▼3.29% | ▲0.83% |

Democratic
50–60%
60–70%
Republican
50–60%

The 2024 United States House of Representatives elections in Maine were held on November 5, 2024, to elect both U.S. representatives from the state of Maine, one from each of the state's congressional districts. These elections coincided with five referendum questions, including a referendum to change the state flag, as well as the presidential election, a U.S. Senate election, and various other state, county and local elections. Primary elections were held on June 11, 2024.

== Overview ==
=== Statewide ===
| Party | Candi- dates | Votes | | Seats | | |
| Party | Candi- dates | No. | % | No. | +/– | % |
|---|---|---|---|---|---|---|
| Democratic Party | 2 | 446,949 | 54.70% | 2 | Steady | 100% |
| Republican Party | 2 | 349,294 | 42.75% | 0 | Steady | 0% |
| Independent | 1 | 20,883 | 2.56% | 0 | Steady | 0% |
| Total | 5 | 817,126 | 100% | 2 | Steady | 100% |

Popular vote
| Democratic | 54.70% |
| Republican | 42.75% |
| Independent | 2.56% |

House seats
| Democratic | 100.0% |

=== District ===
| District | Democratic | | Republican | | Others | | Total | | Result |
| District | Votes | % | Votes | % | Votes | % | Votes | % | Result |
|---|---|---|---|---|---|---|---|---|---|
| District 1 | 249,798 | 58.70% | 154,849 | 36.39% | 20,883 | 4.91% | 425,530 | 100.0% | Democratic hold |
| District 2 | 197,151 | 50.35% | 194,445 | 49.65% | 0 | 0.00% | 391,596 | 100.0% | Democratic hold |
| Total | 446,949 | 54.70% | 349,294 | 42.75% | 20,883 | 2.56% | 817,126 | 100.0% | |

== District 1 ==
2024 Maine's 1st congressional district election
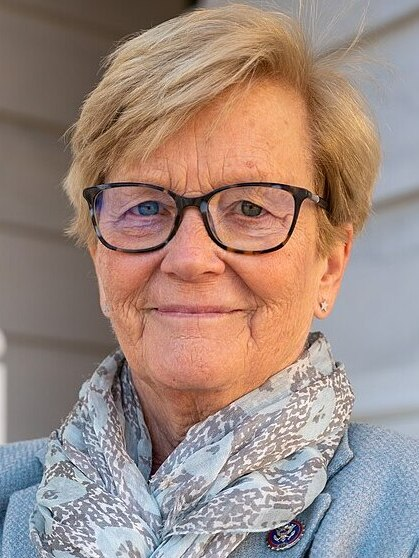

| Nominee | Chellie Pingree | Ronald Russell |
| Party | Democratic | Republican |
| Popular vote | 249,798 | 154,849 |
| Percentage | 58.70% | 36.39% |
- Municipality results Pingree: 40–50% 50–60% 60–70% 70–80% 80–90% Russell: 40–50% 50–60% 60–70% Write-in: 40–50% Tie: 50% No votes
U.S. Representative before election
Chellie Pingree
Democratic
Elected U.S. Representative
Chellie Pingree
Democratic

The incumbent was Democrat Chellie Pingree, who was re-elected with 62.9% of the vote in 2022.

=== Democratic primary ===
==== Nominee ====
- Chellie Pingree, incumbent U.S. representative

==== Endorsements ====
Chellie Pingree

Organizations

- Feminist Majority PAC
- Humane Society Legislative Fund
- J Street PAC
- Population Connection Action Fund

Labor unions

- National Education Association

==== Fundraising ====
Campaign finance reports as of May 22, 2024
| Candidate | Raised | Spent | Cash on hand |
|---|---|---|---|
| Chelllie Pingree (D) | $361,912 | $360,437 | $405,750 |
Source: Federal Election Commission

==== Results ====
Democratic primary results
| Party | Candidate | Votes | % |
|---|---|---|---|
| Democratic | Chellie Pingree (incumbent) | 46,307 | 100.00% |
| Total votes | | 46,307 | 100.00% |

=== Republican primary ===
==== Nominee ====
- Ronald Russell, defense contractor

==== Eliminated in primary ====
- Andrew Piantidosi, tech professional

==== Endorsements ====
Andrew Piantidosi

Newspapers

- Bangor Daily News (Republican primary only)

==== Fundraising ====
Campaign finance reports as of May 22, 2024
| Candidate | Raised | Spent | Cash on hand |
|---|---|---|---|
| Andrew Piantidosi (R) | $77,449 (Note: $10,000 of this total was self-funded by Piantidosi.) | $56,060 | $21,388 |
| Ronald Russell (R) | $54,103 | $44,988 | $9,114 |
Source: Federal Election Commission

==== Results ====
Republican primary results
| Party | Candidate | Votes | % |
|---|---|---|---|
| Republican | Ronald Russell | 16,055 | 56.78% |
| Republican | Andrew Piantidosi | 12,220 | 43.22% |
| Total votes | | 28,275 | 100.00% |

=== Independents ===
==== Declared ====
- Ethan Alcorn, landscape contractor and perennial candidate

=== General election ===
==== Predictions ====
| Source | Ranking | As of |
|---|---|---|
| The Cook Political Report | Solid D | October 31, 2023 |
| Inside Elections | Solid D | October 27, 2023 |
| Sabato's Crystal Ball | Safe D | October 26, 2023 |
| Elections Daily | Safe D | October 26, 2023 |
| CNalysis | Solid D | November 16, 2023 |
| Decision Desk HQ | Solid D | June 1, 2024 |

==== Polling ====
| Poll source | Date(s) administered | Sample size (Note: Key: A – all adults RV – registered voters LV – likely voters V – unclear) | Margin of error | Chellie Pingree (D) | Ronald Russell (R) | Ethan Alcorn (I) | Other | Undecided |
|---|---|---|---|---|---|---|---|---|
| University of New Hampshire | October 29 – November 2, 2024 | 801 (LV) | ± 3.5% | 56% | 28% | 4% | – | 12% |
| SurveyUSA (Note: Poll sponsored by Bangor Daily News and FairVote) | October 24–29, 2024 | 482 (LV) | ± 5.2% | 60% | 28% | 4% | – | 7% |
| Digital Research | September 10 – October 7, 2024 | 303 (RV) | – | 56% | 16% | 4% | 1% (Note: "Refused to Specify" with 1%) | 22% |
| Pan Atlantic Research | September 5–15, 2024 | 414 (LV) | ± 3.5% | 53% | 28% | 4% | – | 14% |

==== Results ====
2024 Maine's 1st congressional district election
| Party | Candidate | Votes | % |
|---|---|---|---|
| Democratic | Chellie Pingree (incumbent) | 249,798 | 58.70% |
| Republican | Ronald Russell | 154,849 | 36.39% |
| Independent | Ethan Alcorn | 20,883 | 4.91% |
| Total votes | | 425,530 | 100.00% |
| Democratic hold | | | |

== District 2 ==
2024 Maine's 2nd congressional district election
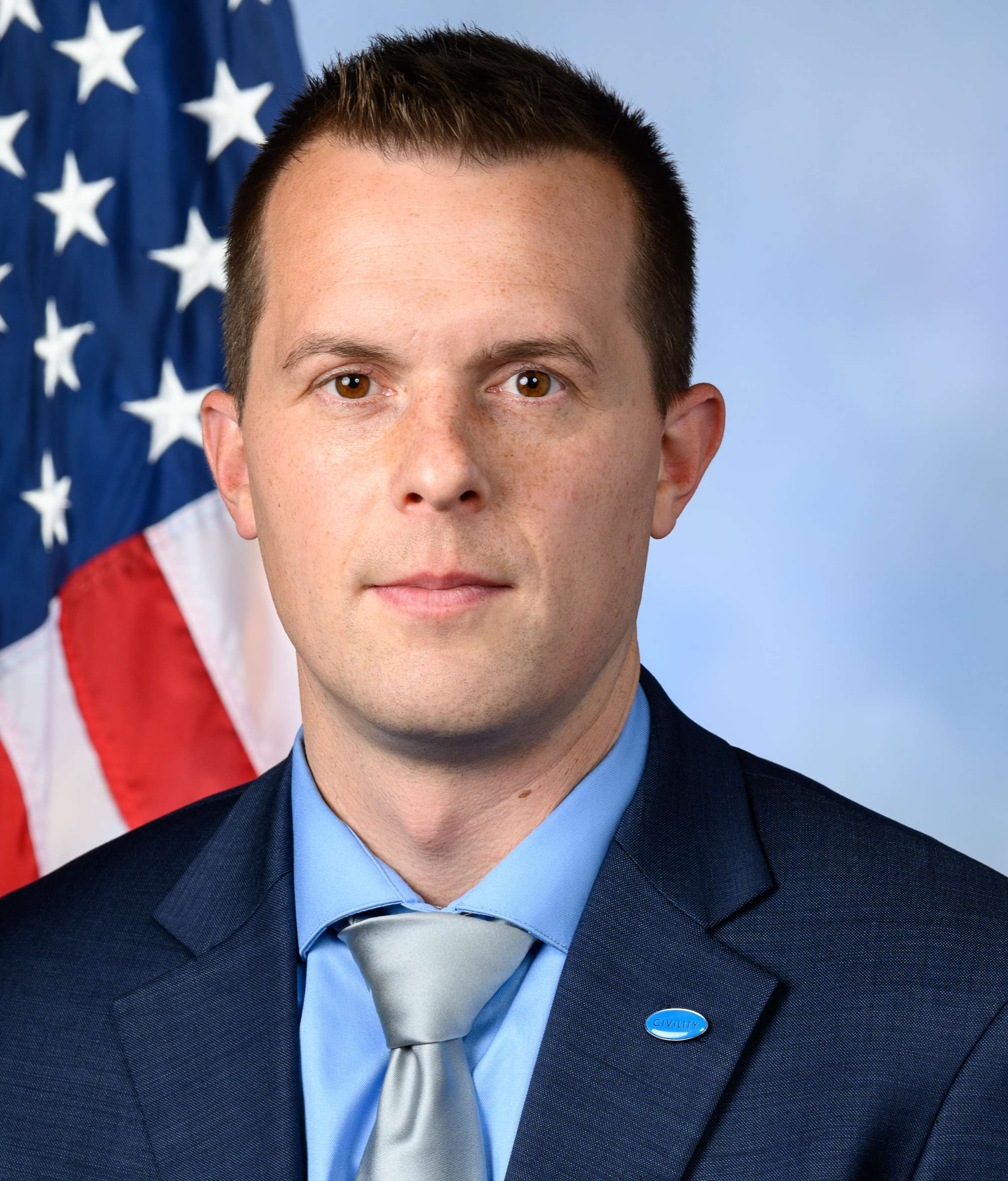

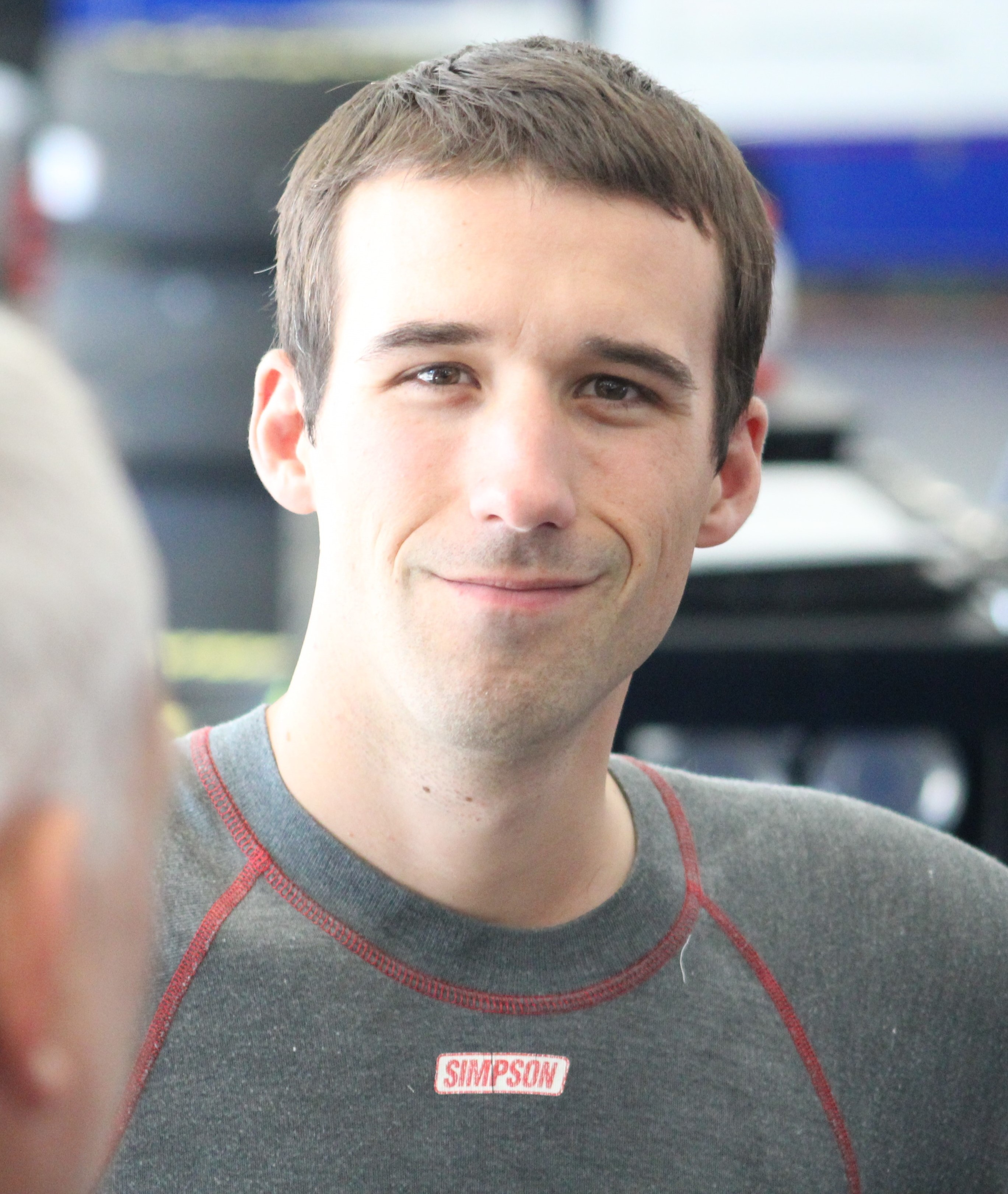
| Nominee | Jared Golden | Austin Theriault |
| Party | Democratic | Republican |
| Popular vote | 197,151 | 194,445 |
| Percentage | 50.35% | 49.65% |
- Golden: 50–60% 60–70% 70–80% Theriault: 50–60% 60–70% 70–80% 80–90% Tie: 50% No votes
U.S. Representative before election
Jared Golden
Democratic
Elected U.S. Representative
Jared Golden
Democratic

The incumbent was Democrat Jared Golden, who was re-elected with 53.1% of the vote in 2022.

Following a recount, it was concluded that Golden won the election on December 4.

=== Democratic primary ===
==== Nominee ====
- Jared Golden, incumbent U.S. representative

==== Endorsements ====
Jared Golden

U.S. senators

- Joe Manchin, U.S. senator from West Virginia (2010–2025) (Independent; Democratic until 2024)

Organizations

- AIPAC
- Democratic Majority for Israel
- End Citizens United
- Jewish Democratic Council of America
- NARAL Pro-Choice America
- Pro-Israel America
- With Honor Fund
- U.S. Chamber of Commerce

Labor unions

- National Education Association

==== Fundraising ====
Campaign finance reports as of May 22, 2024
| Candidate | Raised | Spent | Cash on hand |
|---|---|---|---|
| Jared Golden (D) | $3,703,981 | $1,325,896 | $2,412,774 |
Source: Federal Election Commission

==== Results ====
Democratic primary results
| Party | Candidate | Votes | % |
|---|---|---|---|
| Democratic | Jared Golden (incumbent) | 23,183 | 100.00% |
| Total votes | | 23,183 | 100.00% |

=== Republican primary ===
==== Nominee ====
- Austin Theriault, state representative from the 1st district (2022–present) and former NASCAR driver

==== Eliminated in primary ====
- Mike Soboleski, state representative from the 73rd district (2022–present)

==== Withdrawn ====
- Robert Cross, mortgage broker and former U.S. Department of Agriculture employee

==== Declined ====
- Jason Levesque, former mayor of Auburn and nominee for this district in 2010

==== Endorsements ====
Austin Theriault

Executive branch officials

- Donald Trump, 45th and 47th president of the United States

U.S. representatives

- Mike Johnson, Louisiana's 4th congressional district (2017–present) and speaker of the House (2023–present)
- Steve Scalise, Louisiana's 1st congressional district (2008–present) and House majority leader (2023-present)
- Elise Stefanik, New York's 21st congressional district (2021–present)

State officials

- Lisa Keim, state senator (2016–present)
- Paul LePage, former governor of Maine (2011–2019)

Organizations

- Congressional Leadership Fund
- Log Cabin Republicans PAC
- National Border Patrol Council
- NRA Political Victory Fund
- Republican Jewish Coalition

==== Fundraising ====
Campaign finance reports as of May 22, 2024
| Candidate | Raised | Spent | Cash on hand |
|---|---|---|---|
| Mike Soboleski (R) | $116,923 (Note: $8,500 of this total was self-funded by Soboleski.) | $88,511 | $28,412 |
| Austin Theriault (R) | $1,206,402 | $625,605 | $580,797 |
Source: Federal Election Commission

==== Polling ====
| Poll source | Date(s) administered | Sample size | Margin of error | Mike Soboleski | Austin Theriault | Undecided |
|---|---|---|---|---|---|---|
| Public Opinion Strategies (Note: Poll sponsored by Theriault's campaign) | April 9–11, 2024 | 300 (RV) | ? | 7% | 30% | 63% |

==== Debate ====
2026 Maine's 2nd congressional district Republican primary debate
| No. | Date | Host | Moderator | Link | Republican | Republican |
| Key: P Participant A Absent N Not invited I Invited W Withdrawn | | | | | | |
| Key: P Participant A Absent N Not invited I Invited W Withdrawn | | | | | Mike Soboleski | Austin Theriault |
|---|---|---|---|---|---|---|
| 1 | Apr. 30, 2026 | WGME-TV | Gregg Lagerquist | YouTube | P | P |

==== Results ====
Republican primary results
| Party | Candidate | Votes | % |
|---|---|---|---|
| Republican | Austin Theriault | 26,934 | 66.88% |
| Republican | Mike Soboleski | 13,340 | 33.12% |
| Total votes | | 40,274 | 100.00% |

=== Independents ===
==== Filed paperwork ====
- Diana Merenda (write-in)

=== General election ===
==== Debate ====
2024 Maine's 2nd congressional district debate
| No. | Date | Host | Moderator | Link | Democratic | Republican |
| Key: P Participant A Absent N Not invited I Invited W Withdrawn | | | | | | |
| Key: P Participant A Absent N Not invited I Invited W Withdrawn | | | | | Jared Golden | Austin Theriault |
|---|---|---|---|---|---|---|
| 1 | Oct. 7, 2024 | Maine Chamber of Commerce; News Center Maine | Rob Caldwell | C-SPAN | P | P |

==== Predictions ====
| Source | Ranking | As of |
|---|---|---|
| The Cook Political Report | Tossup | October 31, 2023 |
| Elections Daily | Lean D | November 4, 2024 |
| Inside Elections | Tossup | September 26, 2024 |
| Sabato's Crystal Ball | Lean D | June 5, 2024 |
| CNalysis | Tilt D | November 16, 2023 |
| Decision Desk HQ | Lean D | June 1, 2024 |

==== Polling ====
| Poll source | Date(s) administered | Sample size | Margin of error | Jared Golden (D) | Austin Theriault (R) | Other | Undecided |
|---|---|---|---|---|---|---|---|
| University of New Hampshire | October 29 – November 2, 2024 | 683 (LV) | ± 3.7% | 45% | 44% | – | 11% |
| SurveyUSA | October 24–29, 2024 | 484 (LV) | ± 5.3% | 53% | 41% | – | 6% |
| Axis Research (Note: Poll sponsored by the National Republican Congressional Committee) | October 17–20, 2024 | 411 (LV) | ± 4.8% | 45% | 47% | – | 9% |
| Digital Research | September 10 – October 7, 2024 | 303 (RV) | – | 38% | 38% | 3% (Note: "Refused to Specify" with 3%) | 21% |
| Axis Research | October 3–6, 2024 | – | ± 4.8% | 47% | 45% | – | 8% |
| Pan Atlantic Research | September 5–15, 2024 | 398 (LV) | ± 3.5% | 44% | 47% | – | 9% |
| Axis Research | July 23–25, 2024 | – | ± 4.8% | 50% | 40% | – | 10% |

==== Results ====
2024 Maine's 2nd congressional district election
| Party | Candidate | Votes | % |
|---|---|---|---|
| Democratic | Jared Golden (incumbent) | 197,151 | 50.35% |
| Republican | Austin Theriault | 194,445 | 49.65% |
| Total votes | | 391,596 | 100.00% |
| Democratic hold | | | |

== Notes ==
Partisan clients
