= William H. McLellan =

Maine politician (1832–1912)

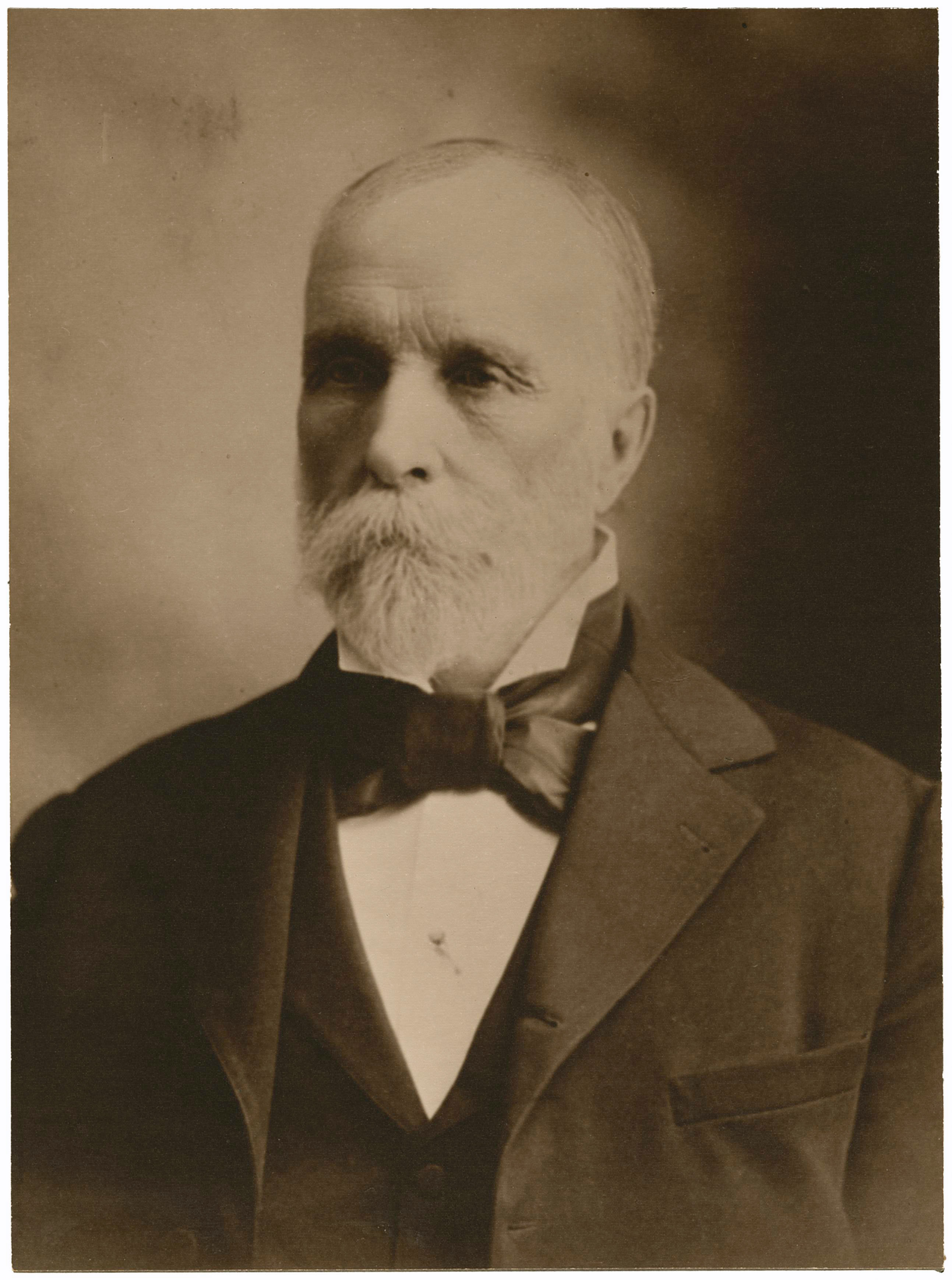

22nd Attorney General of Maine
- In office 1879
- Governor: Seldon Connor; Alonzo Garcelon
- Preceded by: Lucilius A. Emery
- Succeeded by: Henry B. Cleaves

Personal details
- Born: November 26, 1832 Litchfield, Maine
- Died: March 25, 1912 (aged 79) Belfast, Maine
- Resting place: Grove Cemetery, Belfast, Maine
- Party: Democratic Party
- Spouse: Angeline Nickels (m. 1863; died 1908)
- Children: 5
- Parent(s): Dr. William McLellan, Roxanna Woodside
- Education: Bloomfield Academy, Waterville College (now Colby College), and New York University

William H. McLellan (November 26, 1832 – March 25, 1912) was an American lawyer and politician who served as the 24th Attorney General of Maine for less than one year in 1879 out of the two-year term implemented by the Maine Constitution. During his tenure he lobbied the Governor and state legislature to enact criminal justice reform that would have removed a legal mechanism at the time which allowed prisoners to choose which judges would set their bail, as well as removing the right of spousal privilege.

Before becoming Attorney General, McLellan was an active politician in Maine. He was a member of the Maine State Senate in 1872. He was a delegate to Democratic National Convention from Maine in 1876. That same year, he unsuccessfully ran in Maine's 5th Congressional District, losing to the Republican incumbent, Eugene Hale.

== Personal life ==
Son of Dr. William McClellan and Roxanna Woodside, he was born in Litchfield, Maine on November 26, 1832, in the brick house known as the Billings House. He attended the town schools and fitted for college at Bloomfield Academy and entered college at Waterville College (now Colby College), September 1849, where he remained three years. When he went to New York University for one year and then entered upon the study of law at Auburn, Maine, in the office of Morrill and Fessenden. He began the active practice of his profession at Mechanic Falls in the fall of 1854, where he remained until 1860 when he removed to Belfast and formed a partnership with Gen FS Nickerson of Searsport. In 1858, Mr. McClellan was the Democratic candidate for County Attorney of Androscoggin County and was defeated by the Republican candidate, Judge Charles W. Walton of Portland.

He was elected as Senator from Waldo County in 1872 and in 1876 was the candidate of his party for Congressman, but was defeated by Honorable Eugene Hale, now a member of the United States Senate from this state. In 1879, he was elected by the legislature Attorney General and discharged the duties of the office with his ability. In 1881 he moved to Kansas City, Missouri, but returned to Belfast, Maine in 1888, where he now resides in February 1863, He married Angeline Nickels, daughter of Captain David Nickels of Sears Port. They had five children.

Legal offices
| Preceded by Lucilius A. Emery | Maine Attorney General; 1879 | Succeeded by Henry B. Cleaves |
