= Lucilius A. Emery =

American judge (1840–1920)

Emery in 1897

Lucilius Alonzo Emery (July 27, 1840 – August 26, 1920), of Portland, Maine, was a justice of the Maine Supreme Judicial Court from October 5, 1883, to July 27, 1911.

Born in Carmel, Maine, Emery graduated from Bowdoin College in 1861 and read law to gain admission to the bar in 1863, at which time he settled in Ellsworth, Maine. He was the elected to the Maine Senate in 1874 and 1875, and then as Maine Attorney General from 1876 to 1879. On October 5, 1883, Governor Frederick Robie appointed Emery as an associate justice. He became chief justice on December 14, 1906, and serving in that capacity until his resignation on July 27, 1911.

He died in Ellsworth and is buried at Woodbine Cemetery.

== Family ==
Emery's son was economist Henry Crosby Emery.

Political offices
Preceded by Harris M. Plaisted	Maine Attorney General; 1876–1879	Succeeded by William H. McLellan
Preceded by John A. Peters	Justice of the Maine Supreme Judicial Court; 1883–1906	Succeeded by Charles F. Woodard
Preceded by Andrew P. Wiswell	Chief Justice of the Maine Supreme Judicial Court; 1906–1911	Succeeded by William Penn Whitehouse
