= Mike Soboleski =

American politician

Member of the Maine House of Representatives from the 73rd district
- Incumbent
- Assumed office December 8, 2022
- Preceded by: John Andrews

Personal details
- Born: Michael Arthur Soboleski; 1956 or 1957 (age 69–70) Maine, U.S.
- Party: Republican
- Education: University of Maine, Machias

Michael Arthur "Mike" Soboleski (born 1956/1957) is an American politician from the state of Maine. A member of the Republican Party, he has represented the 73rd district in the Maine House of Representatives since 2023. Soboleski ran for the U.S. House in the 2024 election but was defeated by Donald Trump-endorsed Austin Theriault in the Republican primary.

== Leglsiative career ==
Soboleski was elected to the Maine House of Representatives in 2022. He currently serves on the Environment and Natural Resources Committee and the Labor and Housing Committee.

== Personal life ==
Soboleski lives in Phillips.
