= Jason Levesque =

American politician

Mayor of Auburn
- In office 2017–2023
- Preceded by: Richard Gleason
- Succeeded by: Jeff Harmon

Personal details
- Born: 1973 or 1974 (age 51–52) Poland Spring, Maine, U.S.
- Political party: Republican
- Education: West Virginia Wesleyan College; University of Southern Maine

Jason J. Levesque (born 1973/1974) is an American politician and businessperson. Levesque, a Republican, served as the mayor of Auburn, Maine from 2017 to 2023. Re-elected in 2019 and 2021, he was defeated for re-election in 2023.

== Early life ==
Levesque graduated from Edward Little High School in 1992. He studied at West Virginia Wesleyan College and the University of Southern Maine, then enlisted in the U.S. army for eight years. In 2003, he founded a call center company, Argo Contact Centers.

== Politics ==
In 2010, Levesque won the Republican nomination for Congress in Maine's second district before losing in the general election to incumbent Democrat Mike Michaud. In 2017, Levesque was elected mayor of Auburn, Maine. As mayor, Levesque promoted YIMBY movement policies, which sought a massive increase in the number of houses built in the city. These policies earned Auburn the title of "The YIMBYest City in America" in 2022. Levesque was defeated for re-election in November 2023 by former Maine State Police deputy chief Jeff Harmon. Levesque's loss was attributed to disapproval of his housing policies.

== See also ==
- List of mayors of Auburn, Maine
