= Charles F. Woodard =

American judge (1848–1907)

Charles Fuller Woodard (April 19, 1848 – June 17, 1907), of Bangor, Maine, was a justice of the Maine Supreme Judicial Court from December 14, 1906, to June 17, 1907.

Born in Bangor, Maine, Woodward attended the local public schools and Phillips Exeter Academy. He received an undergraduate degree from Harvard University in 1870, and a law degree from Harvard Law School in 1872, gaining admission to the bar in Penobscot County, Maine, in 1872. He was appointed as an associate justice on December 14, 1906, and served until his death the following year.

Political offices
Preceded by Lucilius A. Emery	Justice of the Maine Supreme Judicial Court; 1906–1907	Succeeded by Arno W. King
