= John A. Peters (1822–1904) =

American judge

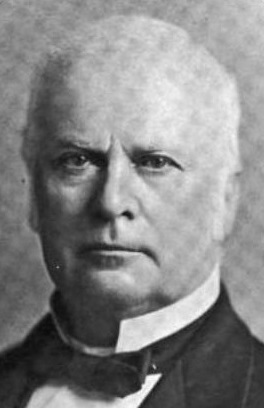
John A. Peters, Maine Congressman and Judge.

John Andrew Peters (October 9, 1822 – April 2, 1904) was a U.S. Congressman from Maine, and the uncle of John Andrew Peters. He was also Chief Justice of the Maine Supreme Judicial Court.

== Biography ==
Born the son of a lumber merchant in Ellsworth, Maine, Peters attended Gorham Academy, Yale College (grad. 1842), where he was a member of Skull and Bones, and Harvard Law School (1843–44). He was admitted to the bar in 1844 and commenced practice in Bangor, Maine. He represented Bangor in the Maine Senate in 1862 and 1863, and then the Maine House of Representatives in 1864. He was Attorney General of Maine 1864–1866.

Following the war Peters was elected as a Republican to the Fortieth, Forty-first, and Forty-second U.S. Congresses (March 4, 1867 – March 3, 1873), but declined to be a candidate for renomination in 1872. He then served as justice of the Maine Supreme Judicial Court (1873–1883), becoming chief justice from 1883 until January 1, 1900, when he resigned. He was succeeded as Chief Justice by his nephew, Andrew Peters Wiswell.

While serving in the U.S. Congress, Peters was Chairman of the Committee on the Congressional Library (the Library of Congress), and a member of the Judiciary Committee.

Peters' first wife, Mary Ann Hathaway, was the daughter of his law partner, Joshua W. Hathaway, who became judge of the Bangor District Court in 1849. His second wife was Fannie E. Roberts, daughter of Bangor "lumber baron" Amos M. Roberts. His brother-in-law, Charles W. Roberts of Bangor, was a Civil War general and post-war Democratic Party candidate for Governor of Maine.

Peters died in Bangor, Maine, on April 2, 1904, and was interred in Mount Hope Cemetery.

Legal offices
Preceded by Josiah Hayden Drummond	Maine Attorney General; 1864–1866	Succeeded by William P. Frye
U.S. House of Representatives
Preceded by John H. Rice	Member of the U.S. House of Representatives from Maine's 4th congressional district March 4, 1867 – March 3, 1873	Succeeded by Samuel F. Hersey
Legal offices
Preceded by Edward Kent	Associate Justice of the Maine Supreme Judicial Court; May 20, 1873 – September 20, 1883	Succeeded by Lucilius A. Emery
Preceded by John Appleton	Chief Justice of the Maine Supreme Judicial Court; September 20, 1883 – January 1, 1900	Succeeded by Andrew Peters Wiswell
