= Margaret Ludwig =

American politician

Member of the Maine Senate from the 3rd district
- In office December 3, 1986 – December 7, 1994
- Preceded by: Michael E. Carpenter
- Succeeded by: Mike Michaud

Personal details
- Born: November 3, 1933 Indore, India
- Died: December 2, 2017 (aged 84) Houlton, Maine
- Party: Republican

Margaret Ludwig (November 3, 1933 – December 2, 2017) was an American politician who served in the Maine Senate from the 3rd district from 1986 to 1994.

She died on December 2, 2017, in Houlton, Maine at age 84.
