= 2010 United States House of Representatives elections in Maine =

- November 2, 2010

All 2 Maine seats to the United States House of Representatives
	Majority party	Minority party
Party	Democratic	Republican
Last election	2	0
Seats won	2	0
Seat change	Steady	Steady
Popular vote	316,156	248,170
Percentage	56.02%	43.97%
Swing	▼4.8pp	▲4.79pp

Democratic
50–60%
60–70%
Republican
50–60%

Elections were held on November 2, 2010, to determine Maine's two members of the United States House of Representatives. Representatives were elected for two-year terms to serve in the 112th Congress from January 3, 2011, until January 3, 2013. Primary elections were held on June 8, 2010.

The races in both the 1st and 2nd districts were rated as competitive by The Cook Political Report and The Rothenberg Political Report, while only the 1st district was rated as competitive by CQ Politics. Both of Maine's incumbents (Chellie Pingree of the 1st district and Mike Michaud of the 2nd district, both Democrats) were re-elected.

A total of 564,368 votes were cast, of which 316,156 (56.02 percent) were for Democratic candidates, 248,170 (43.97 percent) were for Republican candidates, and 42 (0.01 percent) were for write-in candidates.

== Overview ==
Results of the 2010 United States House of Representatives elections in Maine by district:

District	Democratic		Republican		Others		Total		Result
District	Votes	%	Votes	%	Votes	%	Votes	%	Result
District 1	169,114	56.82%	128,501	43.17%	42	0.01%	297,657	100.0%	Democratic hold
District 2	147,042	55.13%	119,669	44.87%	0	0.00%	266,711	100.0%	Democratic hold
Total	316,156	56.02%	248,170	43.97%	42	0.01%	564,368	100.0%	

== District 1 ==
2010 Maine's 1st congressional district election
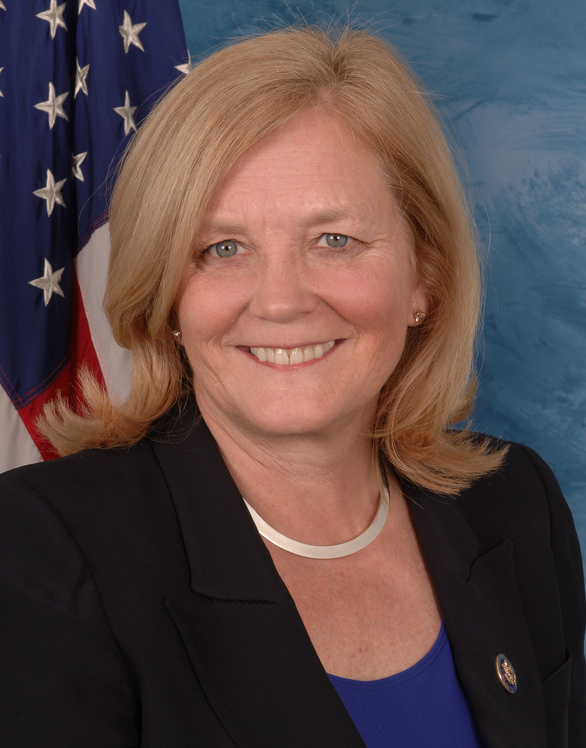

Nominee	Chellie Pingree	Dean Scontras
Party	Democratic	Republican
Popular vote	169,114	128,501
Percentage	56.8%	43.2%
- County results Pingree: 50–60% 60–70%
U.S. Representative before election
Chellie Pingree
Democratic
Elected U.S. Representative
Chellie Pingree
Democratic

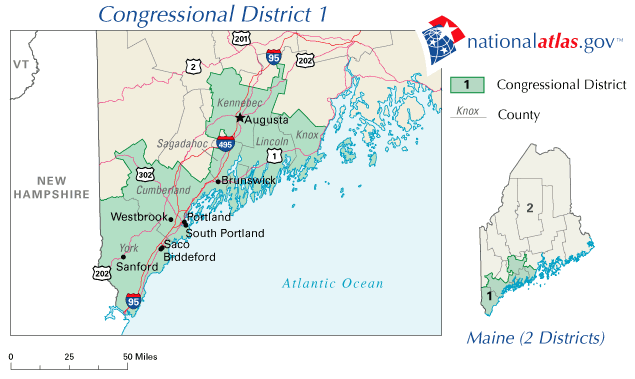
Maine's 1st congressional district in 2010

The 1st district includes Biddeford, Portland and South Portland. The district's population was 95 percent white (see Race and ethnicity in the United States census); 91 percent were high school graduates and 32 percent had received a bachelor's degree or higher. Its median income was $53,324. In the 2008 presidential election the district gave 61 percent of its vote to Democratic nominee Barack Obama and 38 percent to Republican nominee John McCain. In 2010 the district had a Cook Partisan Voting Index of D+8.

Democrat Chellie Pingree, who took office in 2009, was the incumbent. Pingree was elected in 2008 with 55 percent of the vote. In 2010 her opponent in the general election was Republican nominee Dean Scontras, the co-owner of an alternative energy company. Pingree and Scontras were unopposed in their respective primaries. Pingree raised $1,282,675 and spent $1,290,022. Scontras raised $491,374 and spent the same amount.

In a poll of 790 likely voters, conducted by Public Policy Polling between September 2 and 6, 2010, Pingree led with 47 percent to Scontras's 38 percent, while 15 percent were undecided. A poll of 316 likely voters, conducted by Critical Insights (CI) on September 13, 2010, found Pingree leading with 53 percent to Scontras's 29 percent while 18 percent were undecided. A CI poll with a statewide sample of 405 likely voters, conducted on September 27, 2010, found Pingree leading Scontras by 54 percent to 26 percent, while 19 percent were undecided. In a poll of 346 likely voters, conducted by the Maine Center for Public Opinion between October 4 and 7, 2010, 46 percent of respondents supported Pingree while 38 percent favored Scontras and 16 percent were undecided. A CI poll of 305 registered voters, conducted on October 10 and 11, 2010, found Pingree leading with 48 percent to Scontras's 33 percent, while 18 percent remained undecided. In a poll with a statewide sample of 501 likely voters, conducted by Pan Atlantic SMS Group between October 11 and 15, 2010, 49 percent of respondents backed Pingree with 33 percent supported Scontras and 18 percent remained undecided. In a CI poll of 295 likely voters, conducted between October 13 and 17, 2010, Pingree led Scontras by 45 percent to 40 percent while 13 percent were undecided. In CI's final poll Scontras led with 45 percent to Pingree's 41 percent.

On election day Pingree was re-elected with 57 percent of the vote to Scontras's 43 percent. Pingree was one of eight Democratic U.S. Representatives who was elected by a larger margin in 2010 than in 2008. Pingree was again re-elected in 2012, 2014, 2016 and 2018.

=== Predictions ===
Source	Ranking	As of
The Cook Political Report	Tossup	November 1, 2010
Rothenberg	Likely D	November 1, 2010
Sabato's Crystal Ball	Lean D	November 1, 2010
RCP	Tossup	November 1, 2010
CQ Politics	Likely D	October 28, 2010
New York Times	Lean D	November 1, 2010
FiveThirtyEight	Likely D	November 1, 2010

=== General election results ===
Maine's 1st district general election, November 2, 2010
Party	Candidate	Votes	%
Democratic	Chellie Pingree (incumbent)	169,114	56.82
Republican	Dean Scontras	128,501	43.17
Write-In	Write-in candidates	42	0.01
Total votes		297,657	100.00

== District 2 ==
2010 Maine's 2nd congressional district election
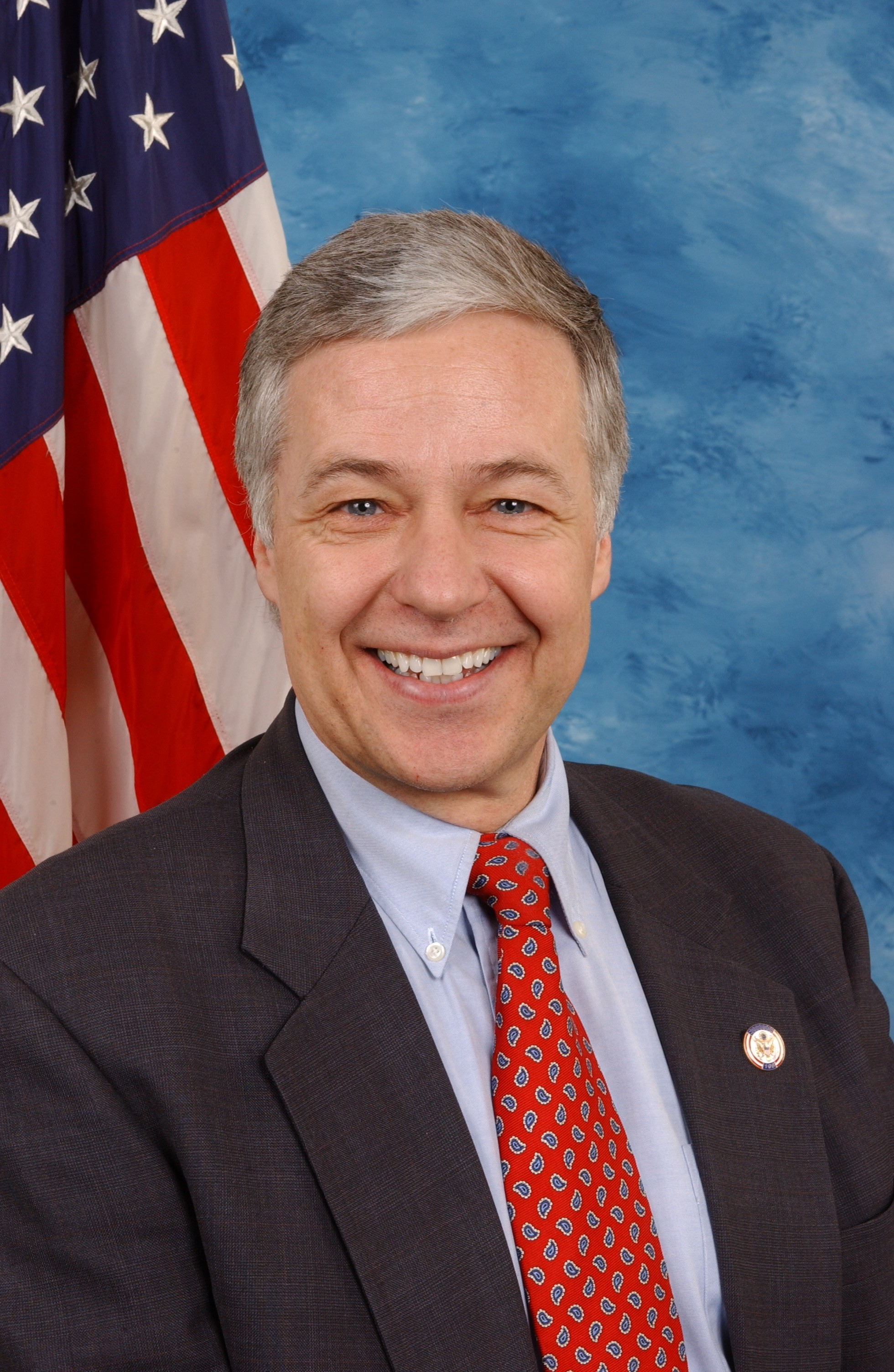

Nominee	Mike Michaud	Jason Levesque
Party	Democratic	Republican
Popular vote	147,042	119,669
Percentage	55.1%	44.9%
- County results Michaud: 50–60% 60–70% Levesque: 50–60%
U.S. Representative before election
Mike Michaud
Democratic
Elected U.S. Representative
Mike Michaud
Democratic

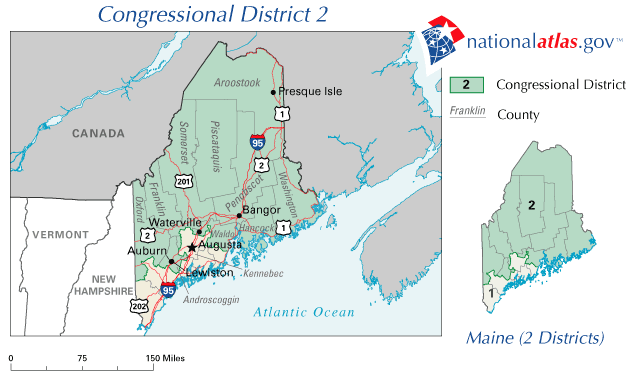
Maine's 2nd congressional district in 2010

The 2nd district included Auburn, Bangor, Lewiston and Waterville. Its population was 94 percent white (see Race and ethnicity in the United States census); 87 percent were high school graduates and 20 percent had received a bachelor's degree or higher. Its median income was $40,812. In the 2008 presidential election the district gave 55 percent of its vote to Democratic nominee Barack Obama and 43 percent to Republican nominee John McCain. In 2010 the district had a Cook Partisan Voting Index of D+3.

Democrat Mike Michaud, who took office in 2003, was the incumbent. Michaud was re-elected in 2008 with 67 percent of the vote. In 2010 Michaud's opponent in the general election was Republican nominee Jason Levesque, a businessman. Both Michaud and Levesque were unopposed in their primaries. Michaud raised $1,044,372 and spent $1,244,848. Levesque raised $542,626 and spent $529,783.

In a poll of 678 likely voters, conducted by Public Policy Polling between September 2 and 6, 2010, Michaud led with 45 percent to Levesque's 38 percent, while 17 percent were undecided. A poll of 287 registered voters, conducted by Critical Insights (CI) on September 13, 2010, found Michaud leading with 48 percent to Levesque's 28 percent while 24 percent were undecided. In a poll with a statewide sample of 405, conducted by CI on September 27, 2010, Michaud had the support of 44 percent while 32 percent backed Levesque and 24 percent were undecided. A CI poll of 300 likely voters, conducted on October 10 and 11, 2010, found Michaud leading with 43 percent to Levesque's 30 percent while 26 percent were undecided. In a poll with a statewide sample of 501 likely voters, conducted by Pan Atlantic SMS Group between October 11 and 15, 2010, 49 percent of respondents supported Michaud while 29 percent favored Levesque and 22 percent were undecided. A poll of 305 likely voters, conducted by CI between October 13 and 17, 2010, found Michaud leading with 49 percent to Levesque's 30 percent, while 20 percent were undecided. In a CI poll of 326 likely voters, the results of which were published later in October 2010, Michaud led with 44 percent to Levesque's 40 percent while 14 percent remained undecided.

On election day Michaud was re-elected with 55 percent of the vote to Levesque's 45 percent. Michaud was again re-elected in 2012 and unsuccessfully ran for Governor of Maine in 2014. He was succeeded by Republican Bruce Poliquin.

=== Predictions ===
Source	Ranking	As of
The Cook Political Report	Lean D	November 1, 2010
Rothenberg	Likely D	November 1, 2010
Sabato's Crystal Ball	Safe D	November 1, 2010
RCP	Tossup	November 1, 2010
CQ Politics	Safe D	October 28, 2010
New York Times	Lean D	November 1, 2010
FiveThirtyEight	Likely D	November 1, 2010

=== General election results ===
Maine's 2nd district general election, November 2, 2010
Party	Candidate	Votes	%
Democratic	Mike Michaud (incumbent)	147,042	55.13
Republican	Jason Levesque	119,669	44.87
Total votes		266,711	100.00

== See also ==
- List of United States representatives from Maine
- Maine's congressional delegations
