= Henry Crosby Emery =

American economist (1872–1924)

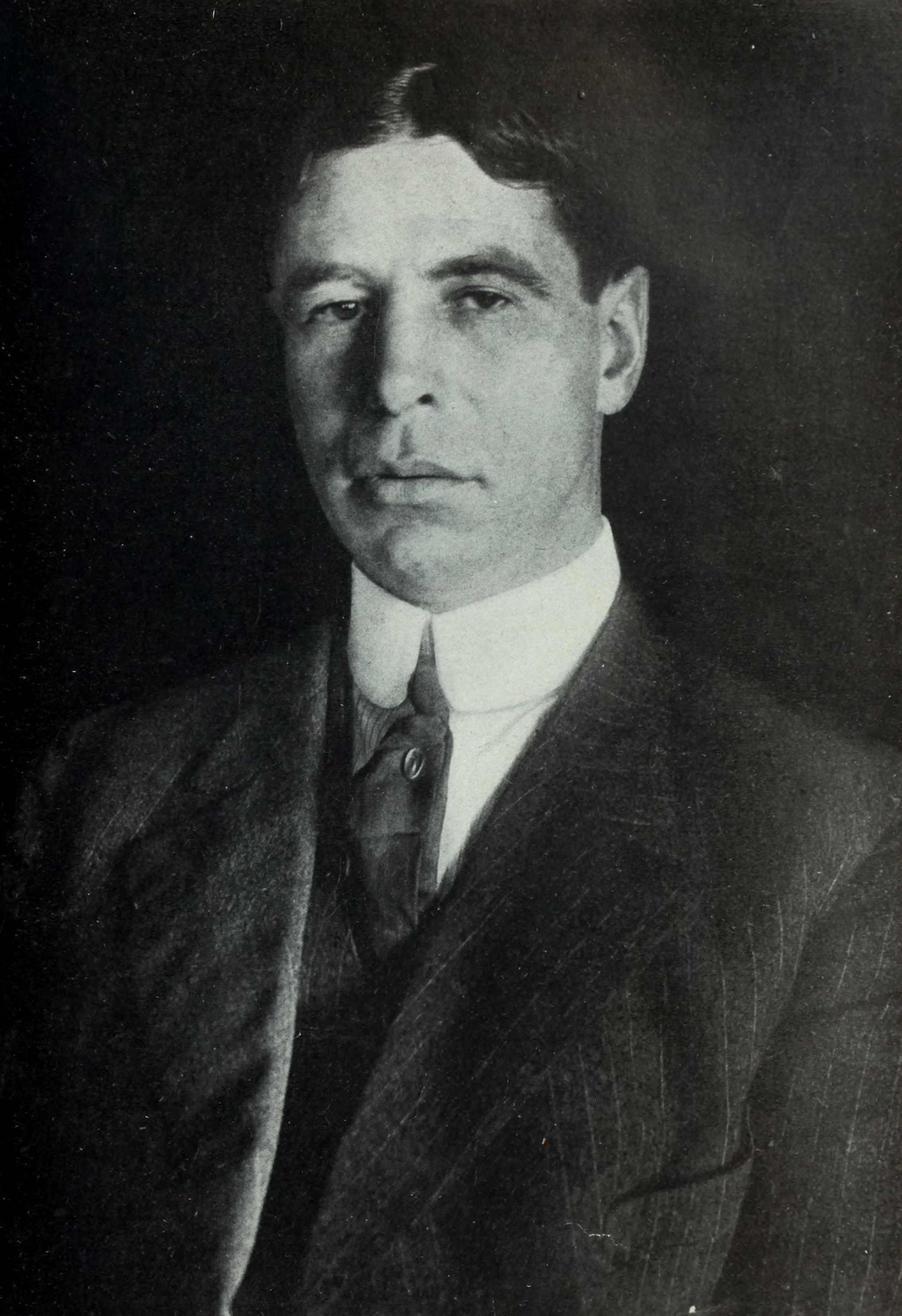
- Born: December 21, 1872; Ellsworth, Maine
- Died: February 6, 1924 (aged 51)

Academic background
- Education: Bowdoin College; Harvard University; Columbia University

Academic work
- Discipline: political economy
- Institutions: Yale University

Henry Crosby Emery (21 December 1872 in Ellsworth, Maine – 6 February 1924) was an American economist.

== Biography ==
In 1892 he graduated from Bowdoin College and later studied at Harvard, Columbia and Berlin. From 1894 to 1900, he was instructor and professor of political economy at Bowdoin, and from 1901 to 1909 he was professor of political economy at Yale. In 1909 he was made chairman of the United States Tariff Board, but returned to his chair at Yale in 1913.

== Family ==
Emery was the son of Maine politician and judge Lucilius A. Emery.

== Works ==
- (1896). Speculation on the Stock and Produce Exchanges of the United States.
- (1910). The Tariff Board and Its Work.
- (1911). The Work of the Tariff Board in Connection with the Cotton Industry.
- (1913). Politician, Party and People.
- (1914). Some Economic Aspects of War.
