= Andrew P. Wiswell =

American judge (1852–1906)

Andrew Peters Wiswell (July 11, 1852 – December 4, 1906) was a justice of the Maine Supreme Judicial Court from April 10, 1893, to December 4, 1906, serving as chief justice from January 2, 1900, to December 4, 1906.

Born in Ellsworth, Maine, Wiswell graduated from Bowdoin College in 1873, and read law to be admitted to the bar the following year. He was Speaker of the Maine House of Representatives in 1891. Appointed an Associate Justice April 10, 1893, he became chief justice on January 2, 1900, and served in that capacity until his death.

He died unexpectedly at the Hotel Touraine in Boston on December 4, 1906.

Political offices
Preceded by Fred Dow	Speaker of the Maine House of Representatives; 1891–1891	Succeeded by Albert R. Savage
Preceded by John A. Peters	Justice of the Maine Supreme Judicial Court; 1900–1906	Succeeded by Lucilius A. Emery
