= 2006 United States House of Representatives elections in Maine =

- November 7, 2006

All 2 Maine seats to the United States House of Representatives
	Majority party	Minority party
Party	Democratic	Republican
Last election	2	0
Seats won	2	0
Seat change	Steady	Steady
Popular vote	350,721	163,165
Percentage	65.44%	30.45%
- Democratic 50–60% 60–70% 70–80%

The Maine congressional elections of 2006 were held on Tuesday, November 7, 2006. The terms of both representatives to the United States House of Representatives expired on January 3, 2007, and therefore were put up for contest. The winning candidates served a two-year term from January 3, 2007, to January 3, 2009. The primary elections were held on Tuesday, June 13, 2006.

== Overview ==
United States House of Representatives elections in Maine, 2006
Party	Votes	Percentage	Seats	+/–
Democratic	350,721	65.44%	2	—
Republican	163,165	30.45%	0	—
Independents	22,029	4.11%	0	—
Totals	535,915	100.00%	2	—

== District 1 ==
2006 Maine's 1st congressional district election
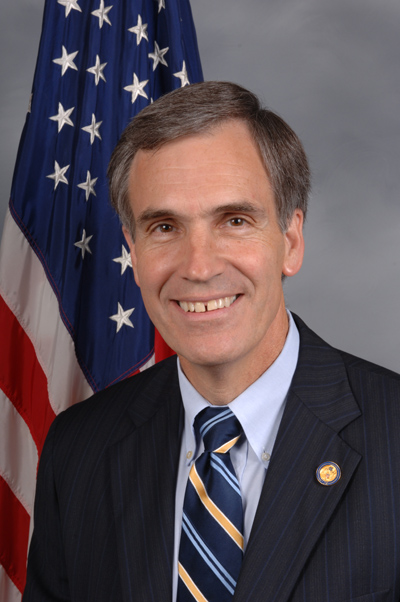

Nominee	Tom Allen	Darlene J. Curley	Dexter J. Kamilewicz
Party	Democratic	Republican	Independent
Popular vote	170,949	88,009	22,029
Percentage	60.8%	31.3%	7.8%
- County results Allen: 50–60% 60–70%
U.S. Representative before election
Tom Allen
Democratic
Elected U.S. Representative
Tom Allen
Democratic

Incumbent Democratic Congressman Tom Allen has been in office since 1997. He defeated Republican challenger Darlene Curley and independent Dexter Kamilewicz in the general election. Neither Allen nor Curley were challenged in their respective primaries.

=== Predictions ===
Source	Ranking	As of
The Cook Political Report	Safe D	November 6, 2006
Rothenberg	Safe D	November 6, 2006
Sabato's Crystal Ball	Safe D	November 6, 2006
Real Clear Politics	Safe D	November 7, 2006
CQ Politics	Safe D	November 7, 2006

=== Results ===
Maine's 1st congressional district election, 2006
Party	Candidate	Votes	%
Democratic	Tom Allen (incumbent)	170,949	60.84
Republican	Darlene J. Curley	88,009	31.32
Independent	Dexter J. Kamilewicz	22,029	7.84
Total votes		280,987	100.00
Democratic hold			

== District 2 ==
2006 Maine's 2nd congressional district election
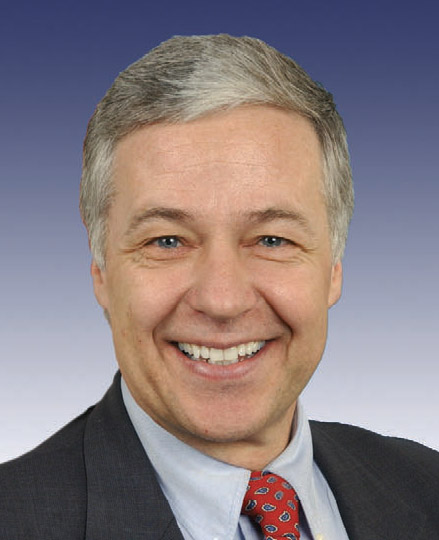

Nominee	Mike Michaud	Laurence D'Amboise
Party	Democratic	Republican
Popular vote	179,772	75,156
Percentage	70.5%	29.5%
- County results Michaud: 60–70% 70–80%
U.S. Representative before election
Mike Michaud
Democratic
Elected U.S. Representative
Mike Michaud
Democratic

Incumbent Democratic Congressman Michael Michaud has served in Congress since 2003. Michaud defeated Republican Laurence D'Amboise in the general election. Neither Michaud nor D'Amboise were challenged in their respective primaries.

=== Predictions ===
Source	Ranking	As of
The Cook Political Report	Safe D	November 6, 2006
Rothenberg	Safe D	November 6, 2006
Sabato's Crystal Ball	Safe D	November 6, 2006
Real Clear Politics	Safe D	November 7, 2006
CQ Politics	Safe D	November 7, 2006

=== Results ===
Maine's 2nd congressional district election, 2006
Party	Candidate	Votes	%
Democratic	Mike Michaud (incumbent)	179,772	70.52
Republican	Laurence D'Amboise	75,156	29.48
Total votes		254,928	100.00
Democratic hold			
