= Mike Michaud =

American politician (born 1955)

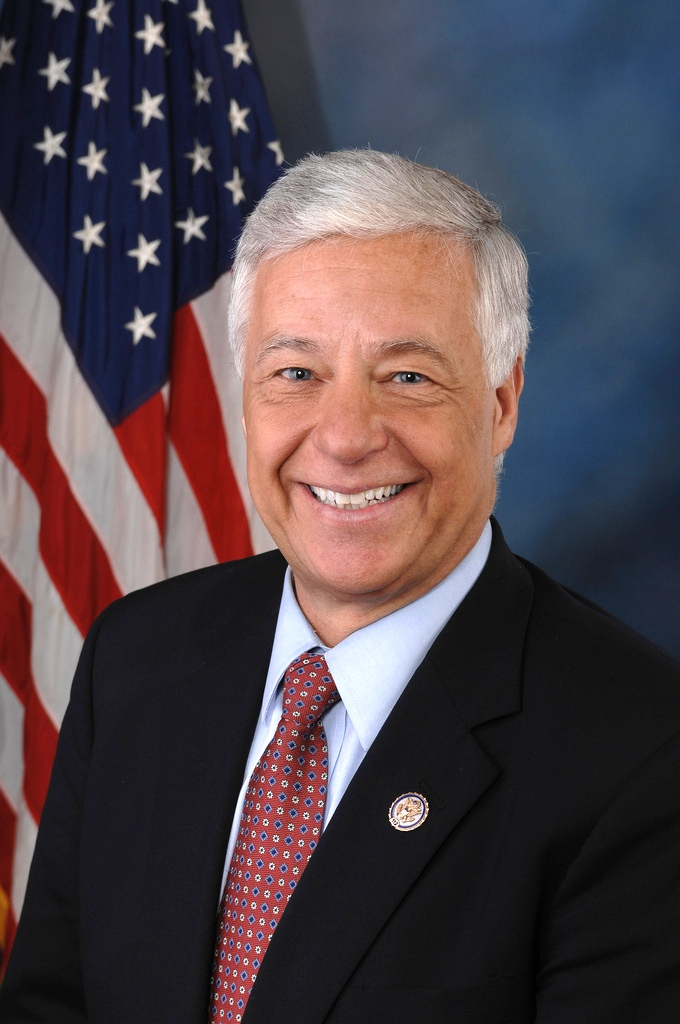
- Official portrait, 2012

US Assistant Secretary of Labor for Veterans' Employment and Training
- In office December 2015 – January 2017
- Nominated by: Barack Obama
- Preceded by: Keith Kelly
- Succeeded by: John Lowry III

Ranking Member of the House Veterans' Affairs Committee
- In office December 3, 2012 – January 3, 2015
- Preceded by: Bob Filner
- Succeeded by: Corrine Brown

Member of the U.S. House of Representatives from Maine's 2nd district
- In office January 3, 2003 – January 3, 2015
- Preceded by: John Baldacci
- Succeeded by: Bruce Poliquin

President of the Maine Senate
- In office December 6, 2000 – December 6, 2001
- Preceded by: Mark Lawrence
- Succeeded by: Rick Bennett

Member of the Maine Senate from the 3rd district
- In office December 7, 1994 – January 3, 2003
- Preceded by: Margaret Ludwig
- Succeeded by: Stephen Stanley

Member of the Maine House of Representatives from the 134th district
- In office December 3, 1980 – December 7, 1994
- Preceded by: Walter Birt
- Succeeded by: Harry Bailey

Personal details
- Born: Michael Herman Michaud; January 18, 1955 (age 71) Millinocket, Maine, U.S.
- Party: Democratic
- Michaud's voice Michaud on the Department of Veterans Affairs Major Medical Facility Lease Authorization Act of 2013. Recorded December 10, 2013

Michael Herman Michaud (/miːʃoʊ/ mee-SHOW; born January 18, 1955) is an American businessman and politician from Maine. Michaud served as the U.S. representative for Maine's 2nd congressional district from 2003 to 2015. He is a member of the Democratic Party. The primarily rural district comprises nearly 80% of the state by area and includes the cities of Lewiston, Auburn, Bangor, Presque Isle, and Ellsworth. It is the largest Congressional district by area east of the Mississippi River.

Michaud was previously President of the Maine Senate. He was employed for over two decades at the Great Northern Paper Company and remains a member of the United Steelworkers. He was one of the few members of Congress during his tenure who did not attend college. He did, however, attend the John F. Kennedy School of Government Program for Senior Executives in State and Local Government at Harvard University. He has also been awarded honorary Doctor of Public Service degrees from Maine's Unity College, Husson College, and Maine Maritime Academy.

Michaud, who speaks a little French, is the first openly Franco-American to be elected to a U.S. federal office from Maine. He was elected as a co-chair of the congressional French Caucus in January 2011. He came out as gay in 2013, becoming one of the few openly LGBT members of Congress and the first to reside in Maine.

Michaud was the Democratic nominee for Governor of Maine in the 2014 election. While initially considered a favorite by some analysts on account of the general unpopularity of incumbent Paul LePage, he lost by a margin larger than expected. He currently holds a seat on the East Millinocket Board of Selectmen.

== Early life ==
Michaud was born in Millinocket, Maine, the son of Geneva Jean (née Morrow) and James Michaud Sr. His parents were both of French-Canadian descent. He grew up in Medway, Maine, and is a graduate of Schenck High School in East Millinocket.

== Early career ==
He was a mill worker and supervisor at Great Northern Paper Company in East Millinocket from 1973 until his election to Congress in 2002, during which time he was a member of the United Steelworkers. Michaud's interest in politics began when he campaigned to clean up the Penobscot River in the late 1970s.

=== Maine House of Representatives (1980–1994) ===
==== Elections ====
Michaud was elected to the Maine House of Representatives in 1980 to the 134th district. In 1984, he defeated an independent candidate by a landslide, despite large Republican gains in other districts. He also won re-election in 1986, 1988, 1990, and 1992.

==== Tenure ====
Michaud served eleven terms in the Maine Legislature, including seven in the Maine House of Representatives and four in the Maine Senate. In the House, Michaud represented Medway and East Millinocket.

As Chair of the Energy Committee, he helped to increase the cost of dumping.

==== Committee assignments ====
- Energy and Natural Resources Committee (Chair)

=== Maine Senate (1994–2003) ===
==== Elections ====
In 1994, he ran for Maine's 3rd Senate district. Despite the fact that it was a typical backlash year with one party taking the lead, he defeated incumbent State Senator Margaret Ludwig, a millionaire, 58%-42%. In 1996, he won re-election to a second term with 64% of the vote. In 1998, he won re-election to a third term with 77% of the vote. In 2000, he won re-election to a fourth term with 69% of the vote.

==== Tenure ====
During his years in the state legislature, he continued to work at the Great Northern Paper Company until his election to Congress. To accommodate his legislative schedule, he changed his factory shifts, for instance by working weekends.

From 1994 to 1996, Michaud was appointed to Governor Angus King's Productivity Realization Task Force. In 1997, he was appointed to the Maine Commission on Children's Health Care. After the 1998 election, the Maine Senate found itself divided into 17 Republicans, 17 Democrats and one Independent. In a compromise organization, each party agreed to assume the Senate Presidency for one year, with the single Independent awarded the chair of the crucial Appropriations Committee. Accordingly, in December 2000, Michaud was unanimously elected President of the Maine Senate.

In 2001, Michaud was honored with the dedication of the Michael H. Michaud Technology Center for helping to secure state funding for the University of Maine at Presque Isle Houlton Higher Education Center. He also received the College Board's Education Award at the National Council of State Legislatures annual meeting.

==== Committee assignments ====
- Joint Appropriations Committee (Chair)

== U.S. House of Representatives ==
=== Elections ===
2002

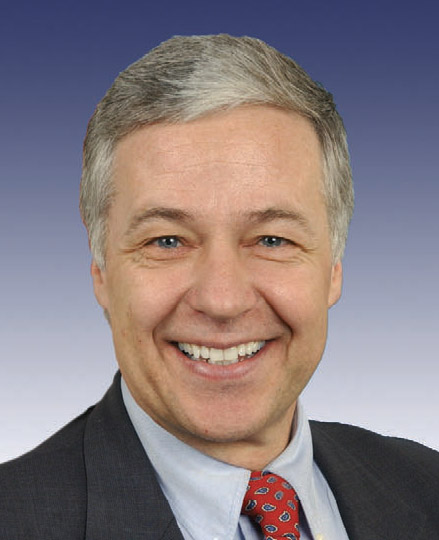
Michaud during the 109th Congress

Michaud ran for Congress in 2002 for Maine's 2nd congressional district after incumbent Democrat John Baldacci decided to run for Governor of Maine. Michaud faced three other state senators in the Democratic primary. He won the primary with a plurality of 31% of the vote, beating the second place challenger, Susan W. Longley, by 4 percentage points. The general election garnered considerable publicity because Michaud was anti-abortion, while the Republican was pro-abortion rights. Republican Kevin Raye, of Perry, was the Chief of Staff to U.S. Senator Olympia Snowe. Michaud defeated Raye, 52%–48%.

2004

Michaud won re-election to a second term, defeating Republican businessman Brian Hamel, 58%–39%.

2006

Michaud won re-election to a third term, defeating Republican Lisbon Town Selectman Laurence Scott D'Amboise, 71%–29%.

2008

Michaud won re-election to a fourth term, defeating his Republican opponent, professor John Frary 67%-33%.

2010

Michaud won re-election to a fifth term, defeating Republican business owner and U.S. Army veteran Jason Levesque, 55%–45%. He won every county in the district, except Piscataquis.

2012

Michaud won re-election to a sixth term, defeating Republican State Senator and Maine Senate President Kevin Raye (who had run ten years earlier), 58%–42%. He won every county except Washington, the location of Raye's hometown of Perry.

=== Tenure ===
Michaud was the only freshman Democratic member of Congress to vote for the 2003 ban on intact dilation and extraction (IDX), often called partial-birth abortion. However, Michaud's stance on abortion and related reproductive issues has changed since he entered office. When he was elected in 2003, he received a 10% rating by the NARAL Pro Choice America, a reflection of anti-abortion votes; between 2010 and 2013, the same organization gave Michaud a 100% rating. This change is likely in part because of the votes Michaud made in favor of allowing and expanding stem cell research, and his vote against banning abortion from federal health care coverage.

Michaud has been an advocate for veterans for as long as he has served in Congress. As Chairman of the Health Subcommittee of the Veterans' Affairs Committee, Michaud has advocated for more extensive healthcare benefits for veterans and also for more inclusive rural healthcare for veterans. In 2007, Michaud came close to being elected Chairman of the Veterans' Affairs Committee. He has also called for lowering the cost of prescription drugs. In addition, Michaud has worked to pass legislation providing scholarships for returning soldiers, and decreasing the rate of homelessness among veterans. Recently, Michaud became an original cosponsor of "Hiring our Veterans Act" which gives tax credits to employers who hire veterans. Michaud has worked with the U.S. Department of Veteran Affairs on many projects. These include a scholarship foundation for children of soldiers killed in active duty, an expansion of VA care in rural Maine, and a major increase in VA funding.

On May 29, 2014, Michaud called for the resignation of Veterans Affairs Secretary Eric Shinseki in response to problems in the Veterans Health Administration regarding long wait times and coverups of poor performance. He had faced criticism on this issue from his opponents in the Governor's race.

In addition to veterans' health, Michaud has been supporting healthcare on a larger scale. He has voted in favor of increased health coverage for children, and voted against cuts to Medicare. In 2010, he received a 100% rating from the American Public Health Association, along with favorable ratings from other healthcare groups. Michaud joined a group of 44 congressmen in November 2011 to express the importance of men's being screened for prostate cancer. This bipartisan group was formed after the United States Preventive Task Force recommended that healthy men should not have such a screening.

Michaud is a member of the Blue Dog Coalition, a group of conservative Democrats in the House of Representatives. He was the only Congressperson from New England in the coalition. On October 19, 2007, he endorsed former Senator John Edwards for president.

Michaud has a strong record of voting in support of environmental issues. He voted no on opening Outer Continental Shelf to oil drilling, on barring the EPA from regulating greenhouse gases, on scheduling permitting for new oil refineries, on authorizing construction of new oil refineries, on passage of the Bush Administration national energy policy, and on implementing Bush-Cheney national energy policy. Michaud voted yes on enforcing limits on CO_{2} global warming pollution by requiring utilities to supply an increasing percentage of their demand from a combination of energy efficiency savings and renewable energy, on tax credits for renewable electricity with PAYGO offsets, on tax incentives for energy production and conservation, on tax incentives for renewable energy, on investing in homegrown biofuel, on criminalizing oil cartels like OPEC, on removing oil and gas exploration subsidies, and on keeping moratorium on offshore oil drilling. Furthermore, Michaud co-sponsored a bill in 2005 to establish greenhouse gas tradeable allowances; the bill was referred to the Senate Environment and Public Works Committee but, however, it never came to vote. He also co-sponsored a bill in 2008 to allow states to define stricter greenhouse gas emission standards than those specified by the federal Clean Air Act. In keeping with his voting record, Michaud adopted a Blue Dog Coalition press release to balance fossil fuels and viable renewable energy. Campaign for America's Future (CAF) has given Michaud a score of 100% on energy issues.

Michaud was briefly mentioned in Maine native author Stephen King's work, 11/22/63.

=== Committee assignments ===
- Committee on Veterans' Affairs
  - Subcommittee on Health (Ranking member)
- Committee on Small Business
  - Subcommittee on Finance and Tax
  - Subcommittee on Rural and Urban Entrepreneurship
- Committee on Transportation and Infrastructure
  - Subcommittee on Economic Development, Public Buildings, and Emergency Management
  - Subcommittee on Highways and Transit
  - Subcommittee on Railroads, Pipelines, and Hazardous Materials

=== Caucus memberships ===
- Addiction, Treatment and Recovery Caucus
- Congressional Biomass Caucus
- Caucus to Fight and Control Methamphetamine
- Congressional Nursing Caucus
- International Conservation Caucus
- Renewable Energy Caucus
- Sudan Caucus
- Congressional Cement Caucus

== 2014 gubernatorial campaign ==
On June 13, 2013, Michaud announced that he was forming an exploratory committee to enter the 2014 race for Governor of Maine. His campaign announced on August 14 that he would officially enter the race the next day.

Michaud won the Democratic primary unopposed. He lost the general election to incumbent Republican Paul LePage by a larger than expected margin, in part due to the unknown popularity of LePage, an alleged massive Republican wave that took place nationwide, and a third-party candidate splitting votes.

He was succeeded in Congress by Republican Bruce Poliquin in January 2015.

== Post-election activities ==
The United States Department of Labor announced on July 30, 2015, that President Barack Obama nominated Michaud to a department position dealing with training and employment of veterans.

Michaud served as Assistant Secretary of Labor for Veterans' Employment and Training from December 2, 2015, to January 20, 2017. As the head of the Veterans' Employment and Training Service (VETS), Michaud reported to Secretary of Labor Tom Perez. VETS serves as the focal point in the federal government for veterans' employment by preparing military service members for transition to civilian employment, providing veterans with services to assist them in getting good jobs, protecting veterans' employment rights, and promoting veterans' employment in the private sector.

In 2018, he was elected to the Board of Selectmen in East Millinocket, his hometown.

On March 28, 2019, Michaud was nominated by Gov. Janet Mills to serve as a trustee on both the board of the University of Maine System and the Maine Community College System.

Michaud endorsed Michael Bloomberg as a nominee for President of the United States in the 2020 Maine Democratic primary.

== Personal life ==
Michaud came out as gay in an editorial released to the Portland Press Herald, Bangor Daily News, and the Associated Press on November 4, 2013; however he stated that he has never had a romantic partner. He is the first openly LGBT congressman to serve the state of Maine; he was one of seven then-current United States representatives to be openly LGBT, and one of eight in either house of Congress. If he had been elected governor, he would have become the first openly gay governor in the United States at the time of his election (Jim McGreevey of New Jersey came out after he had taken office). Michaud served as a grand marshal for the 2014 Portland Pride Parade on June 21.

== Electoral history ==
Year	Office	Election	Democratic	Party	Votes	%	Republican	Party	Votes	%	Other	Party	Votes	%
2002	Maine's 2nd congressional district	General	Mike Michaud	Democratic	116,868	52.01%	Kevin Raye	Republican	107,849	47.99%				
2004	Maine's 2nd congressional district	General	Mike Michaud	Democratic	199,303	58.03%	Brian Hamel	Republican	135,547	39.47%	Carl Cooley	Independent	8,586	2.50
2006	Maine's 2nd congressional district	General	Mike Michaud	Democratic	179,732	70.52%	Laurence D'Amboise	Republican	75,146	29.48%				
2008	Maine's 2nd congressional district	General	Mike Michaud	Democratic	226,274	67.44%	John Frary	Republican	109,268	32.57%				
2010	Maine's 2nd congressional district	General	Mike Michaud	Democratic	147,042	55.13%	Jason Levesque	Republican	119,669	44.87%				
2012	Maine's 2nd congressional district	General	Mike Michaud	Democratic	191,456	58.19%	Kevin Raye	Republican	137,542	41.81%				
2014	Governor of Maine	General	Mike Michaud	Democratic	265,125	43.37%	Paul LePage	Republican	294,553	48.19%	Eliot Cutler	Independent	51,518	8.43%

== See also ==
- List of LGBT members of the United States Congress

Political offices
Preceded by Mark Lawrence	President of the Maine Senate; 2000–2001	Succeeded by Rick Bennett
U.S. House of Representatives
Preceded by John Baldacci	Member of the U.S. House of Representatives from Maine's 2nd congressional district 2003–2015	Succeeded by Bruce Poliquin
Preceded by Bob Filner	Ranking Member of the House Veterans' Affairs Committee; 2012–2015	Succeeded by Corrine Brown
Party political offices
Preceded by Libby Mitchell	Democratic nominee for Governor of Maine; 2014	Succeeded by Janet Mills
U.S. order of precedence (ceremonial)
Preceded by Tom Allen as Former U.S. Representative	Order of precedence of the United States as Former U.S. Representative	Succeeded by Alan Wheat as Former U.S. Representative
