= 2008 United States House of Representatives elections in Maine =

- November 4, 2008

All 2 Maine seats to the United States House of Representatives
	Majority party	Minority party
Party	Democratic	Republican
Last election	2	0
Seats won	2	0
Seat change	Steady	Steady
Popular vote	431,903	278,198
Percentage	60.82%	39.18%
Swing	▼4.62pp	▲8.68pp
- Democratic 50–60% 60–70% 70–80%

The 2008 congressional elections in Maine were held on November 4, 2008, to determine representation for the state of Maine in the United States House of Representatives, coinciding with the presidential and senatorial elections. Representatives are elected for two-year terms; those elected will serve in the 111th Congress from January 3, 2009, until January 3, 2011.

Maine has two seats in the House, apportioned according to the 2000 United States census. Its 2007–2008 congressional delegation consisted of two Democrats. No districts changed party, although CQ Politics forecasted district 1 to be at some risk for the incumbent party. The primary election for Republican Party and Democratic Party candidates was held on June 10, 2008.

== Overview ==
United States House of Representatives elections in Maine, 2008
Party	Votes	Percentage	Seats	+/–
Democratic	431,903	60.82%	2	—
Republican	278,198	39.18%	0	—
Totals	710,101	100.00%	2	—

== District 1 ==
2008 Maine's 1st congressional district election
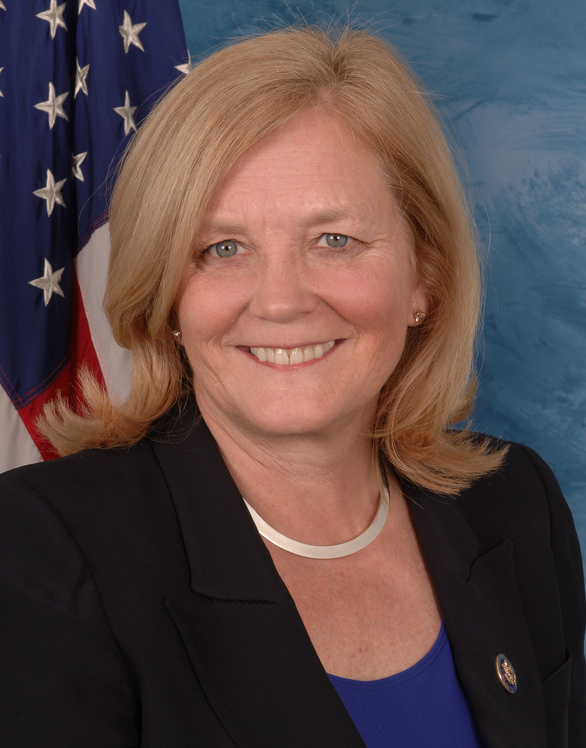

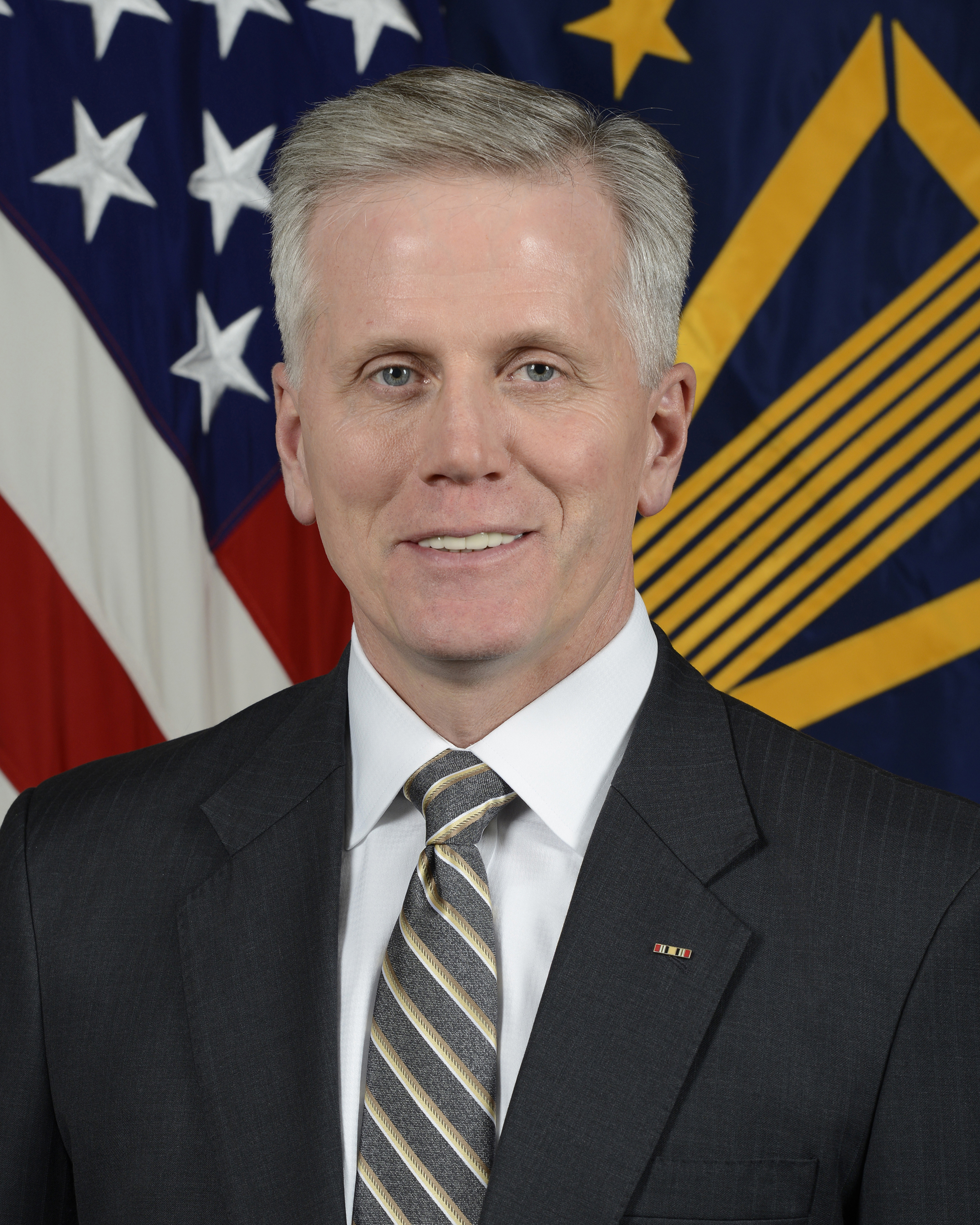
Nominee	Chellie Pingree	Charlie Summers
Party	Democratic	Republican
Popular vote	205,629	168,930
Percentage	54.90%	45.10%
- County results Pingree: 50–60% 60–70%
U.S. Representative before election
Tom Allen
Democratic
Elected U.S. Representative
Chellie Pingree
Democratic

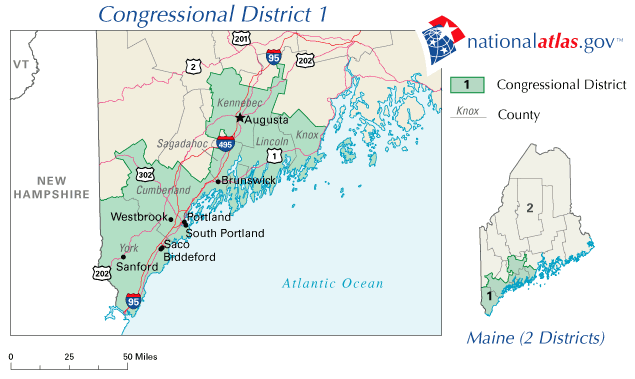

This was an open seat in 2008 because incumbent Democrat Tom Allen ran for the U.S. Senate seat held by Republican Susan Collins. Democrats were favored to hold this seat but were not assured of victory; John Kerry won 55% here in 2004 (CPVI=D+6). The Democratic nominee was Chellie Pingree, former Common Cause President and former Maine Senate Majority Leader who ran against Collins in 2002. The Republican nominee was Charlie Summers, former Maine State Senator, Northeast Small Business Administration Director and Iraq War veteran who ran against Allen in 2004.

=== Democratic primary ===
Democratic primary results
Party	Candidate	Votes	%	±%
Democratic	Chellie Pingree	24,324	43.92%	
Democratic	Adam Cote	15,706	28.36%	
Democratic	Michael F. Brennan	6,040	10.91%	
Democratic	Ethan Strimling	5,833	10.53%	
Democratic	Mark Lawrence	2,726	4.92%	
Democratic	Stephen J. Meister	753	1.35%	
Total votes		55,382	100%	

=== Republican primary ===
Republican primary results
Party	Candidate	Votes	%	±%
Republican	Charles E. Summers	21,154	59.75%	
Republican	Dean Scontras	14,248	40.25%	
Total votes		35,402	100%	

=== General election ===
==== Predictions ====
Source	Ranking	As of
The Cook Political Report	Safe D	November 6, 2008
Rothenberg	Safe D	November 2, 2008
Sabato's Crystal Ball	Safe D	November 6, 2008
Real Clear Politics	Safe D	November 7, 2008
CQ Politics	Likely D	November 6, 2008

==== Results ====
Maine's 1st congressional district election, 2008
Party	Candidate	Votes	%
Democratic	Chellie Pingree	205,629	54.90
Republican	Charles E. Summers	168,930	45.10
Total votes		374,559	100.00
Democratic hold			

== District 2 ==
2008 Maine's 2nd congressional district election
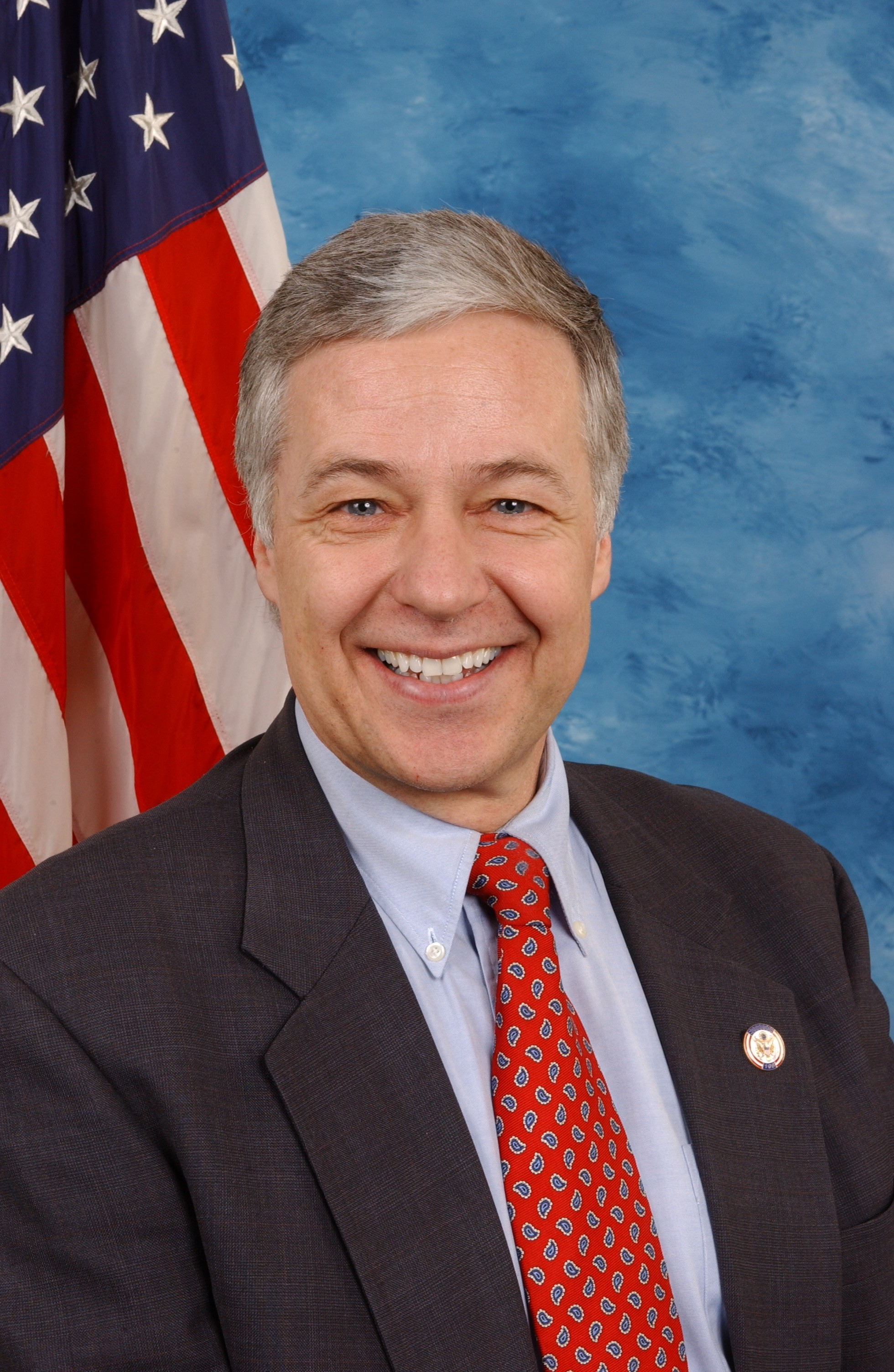

Nominee	Mike Michaud	John N. Frary
Party	Democratic	Republican
Popular vote	226,274	109,268
Percentage	67.4%	32.6%
- County results Michaud: 50–60% 60–70% 70–80%
U.S. Representative before election
Mike Michaud (inc.)
Democratic
Elected U.S. Representative
Mike Michaud
Democratic

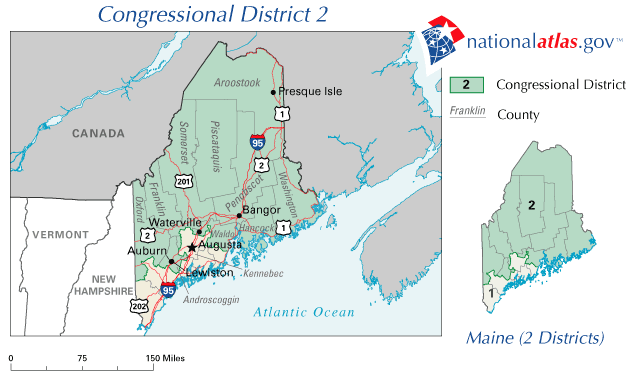

Incumbent Democrat Mike Michaud (campaign website) was challenged by Republican John N. Frary.

=== Predictions ===
Source	Ranking	As of
The Cook Political Report	Safe D	November 6, 2008
Rothenberg	Safe D	November 2, 2008
Sabato's Crystal Ball	Safe D	November 6, 2008
Real Clear Politics	Safe D	November 7, 2008
CQ Politics	Safe D	November 6, 2008

Maine's 2nd congressional district election, 2008
Party	Candidate	Votes	%
Democratic	Mike Michaud (inc.)	226,274	67.44
Republican	John N. Frary	109,268	32.56
Total votes		335,542	100.00
Democratic hold			
