= Maine's congressional districts =

U.S. House districts in the state of Maine

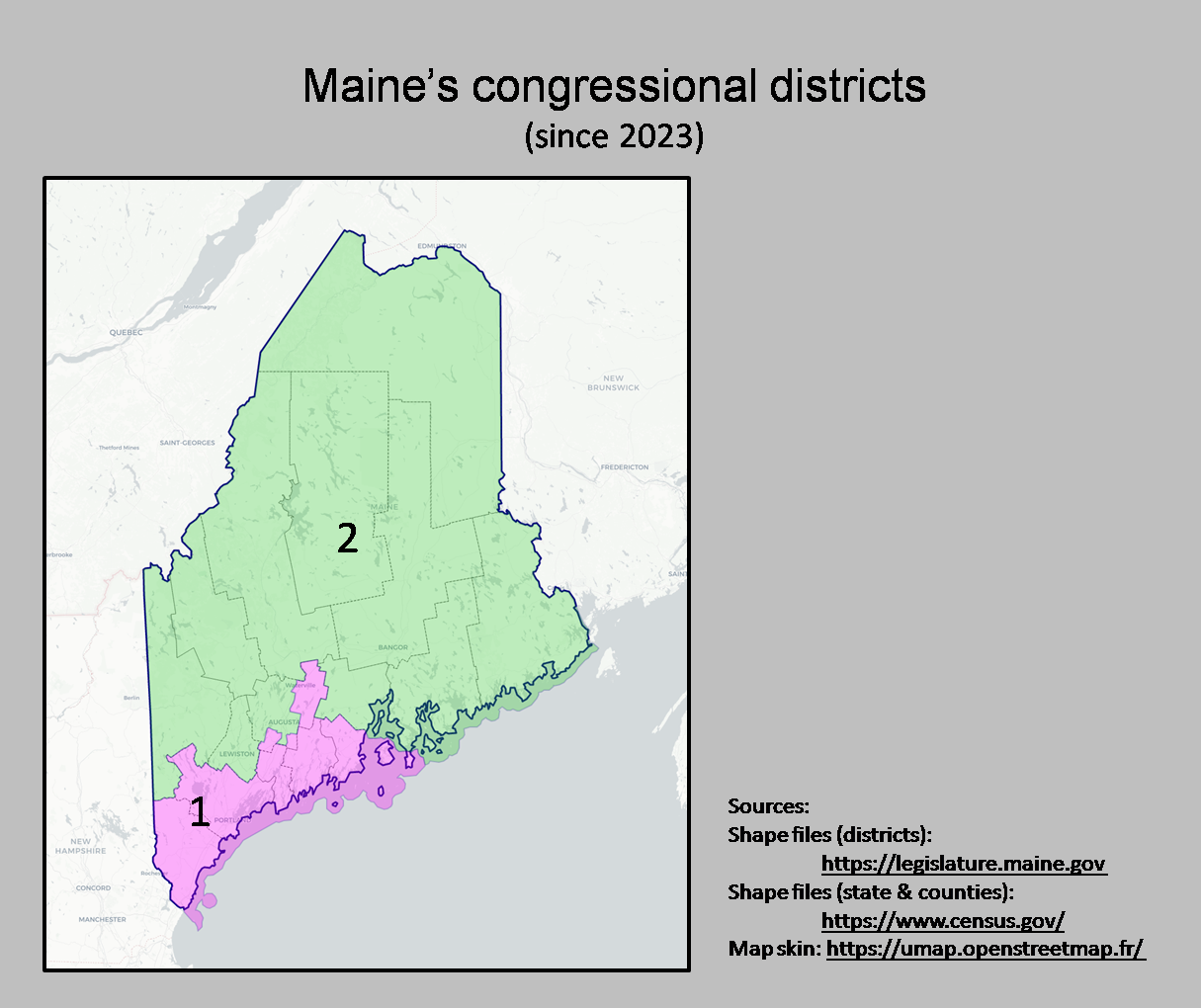
Maine's congressional districts since January 3, 2023 Interactive map version

Maine is divided into two congressional districts, each represented by an elected member of the United States House of Representatives.

Unlike every other U.S. state except for Nebraska, Maine apportions two of its Electoral College votes according to congressional district, making each district its own separate battleground in US presidential elections. Following the 2016 elections, the 2nd district had the sole Republican representative in New England. After 2018, however, the Republican incumbent was ousted by a Democratic challenger. As a result, all of New England was represented by Democrats in the House of Representatives.

== Current districts and representatives ==
The districts are currently represented in the 118th United States Congress by 2 Democrats.

Current U.S. representatives from Maine
District	Member (Residence)	Party	Incumbent since	CPVI (2025)	District map
1st	Chellie Pingree (North Haven)	Democratic	January 3, 2009	D+11	
2nd	Jared Golden (Lewiston)	Democratic	January 3, 2019	R+4	

== Historical and present district boundaries ==
Table of United States congressional district boundary maps in the State of Maine, presented chronologically. All redistricting events that took place in Maine between 1973 and 2013 are shown.

Year	Statewide map
1973–1982	
1983–1992	
1993–1994	
1995–2002	
2003–2004	
2005–2013	
2013–2023	
Since 2023	

== Obsolete districts ==
- Maine's at-large congressional district since 1821
- Maine's 3rd congressional district since the 1960 census
- Maine's 4th congressional district since the 1930 census
- Maine's 5th congressional district since the 1880 census
- Maine's 6th congressional district since the 1860 census
- Maine's 7th congressional district since the 1850 census
- Maine's 8th congressional district since the 1840 census

== See also ==
- Maine's congressional delegations
- List of United States congressional districts
