= 1976 United States Senate election in Maine =

- November 2, 1976
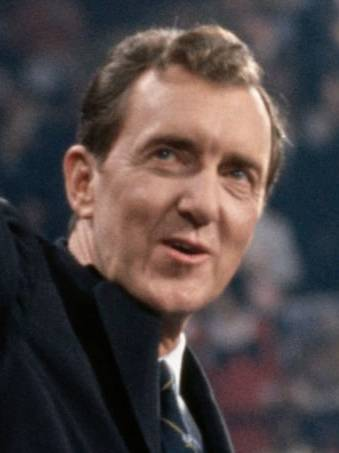

Nominee	Edmund Muskie	Robert A. G. Monks
Party	Democratic	Republican
Popular vote	292,704	193,489
Percentage	60.20%	39.80%
- Muskie: 50–60% 60–70% 70–80% 80–90% >90% Monks: 50–60% 60–70% 70–80%
U.S. senator before election
Edmund Muskie
Democratic
Elected U.S. Senator
Edmund Muskie
Democratic

The 1976 United States Senate election in Maine took place on November 2, 1976. Incumbent Democratic senator Edmund Muskie won re-election to a fourth term, defeating Republican nominee Robert Monks by 99,215 votes. Muskie carried 15 of Maine's 16 counties, with Monks winning only Hancock County.

This would be Muskie's final election. He would resign to become Secretary of State in 1980. George J. Mitchell, a fellow Democrat, would be nominated by Governor Joseph E. Brennan to take the seat following Muskie's resignation. Monks, who had unsuccessfully challenged incumbent senator Margaret Chase Smith in the Republican primary four years earlier, would go on to become chairman of the Maine Republican Party from 1977 to 1978, and hold several positions in the federal government under president Ronald Reagan. He would make a third run for the U.S. Senate in 1996, losing the Republican primary to Susan Collins. Though Monks remained a registered Republican until his death, he would endorse Democratic president Barack Obama's re-election campaign in 2012.

== General election ==
=== Candidates ===
- Edmund Muskie (D), incumbent U.S. Senator
- Robert A. G. Monks (R), shareholder activist and candidate for U.S. Senate in 1972

=== Results ===
General election results
Party	Candidate	Votes	%
Democratic	Edmund Muskie (incumbent)	292,704	60.20%
Republican	Robert A. G. Monks	193,489	39.80%
Total votes		486,193	100.00%
Democratic hold			

== See also ==
- 1976 United States Senate elections
