= 1978 United States Senate election in Maine =

- November 7, 1978
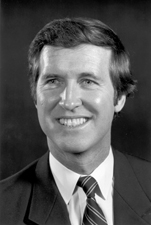

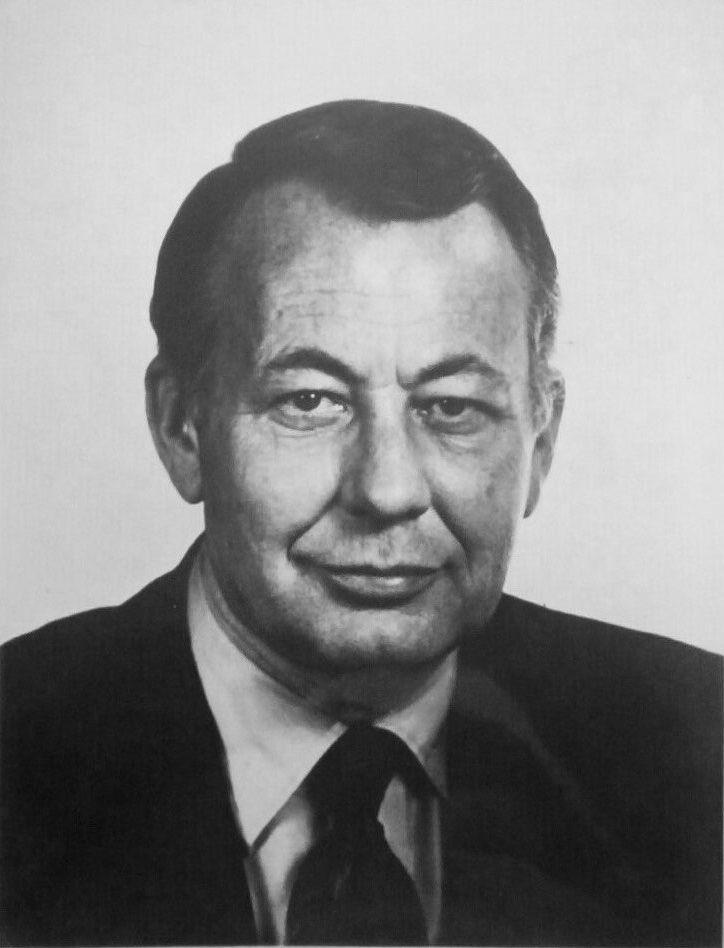

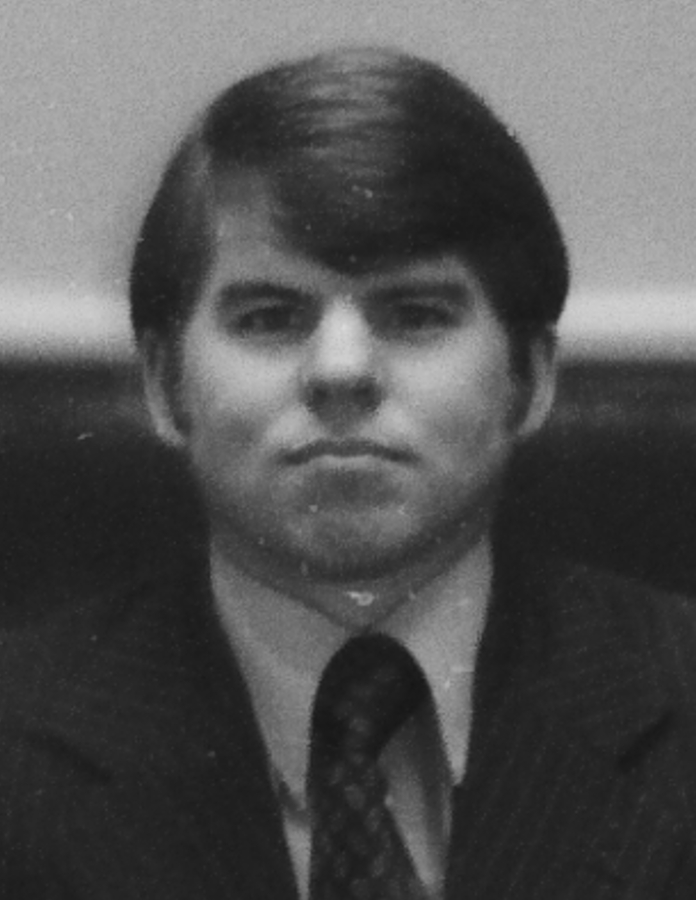
| Nominee | William Cohen | William Hathaway | Hayes Gahagan |
| Party | Republican | Democratic | Independent |
| Popular vote | 212,294 | 127,327 | 27,824 |
| Percentage | 56.59% | 33.94% | 7.42% |
- Cohen: 30–40% 40–50% 50–60% 60–70% 70–80% 80–90% >90% Hathaway: 40–50% 50–60% 60–70% 70–80% >90% Gahagan: 40–50% Tie: 40–50% 50%
U.S. senator before election
William Hathaway
Democratic
Elected U.S. Senator
William Cohen
Republican

The 1978 United States Senate election in Maine was held on November 7, 1978. Incumbent Democratic U.S. Senator William Hathaway ran for re-election to a second term, but was defeated by William Cohen, the Republican U.S. Representative from Maine's 2nd congressional district.

No incumbent Senator has lost by such a large margin since Hathaway's 22.65-point loss, though James Abdnor in 1980, John Boozman in 2010, and Tommy Tuberville in 2020 all received larger percentages of the vote than Cohen's 56.59% against incumbent Senators

This was the last time an incumbent Senator from Maine was defeated until 2026.

== Background ==
Elected to the U.S. Senate in 1972 against incumbent Margaret Chase Smith, Hathaway had established himself as a very liberal senator, being ranked an average of 92 percent more liberal than the Senate as a whole during his first term. This put him at risk, considering the conservative nature of Maine before the 1990s. Meanwhile, young former state senator Hayes Gahagan launched an independent campaign, running well to the right of Cohen. Other candidates to join the race were independent John J. Jannace and perennial candidate Plato Truman.

== Primaries ==
=== Republican primary results ===
Republican Senate primary results: June 13, 1978
| Year | Candidate | Votes | % |
|---|---|---|---|
| 1978 | William Cohen | 69,824 | 100 |

=== Democratic primary results ===
Democratic Senate primary results: June 13, 1978
| Year | Candidate | Votes | % | Candidate | Votes | % |
|---|---|---|---|---|---|---|
| 1978 | William D. Hathaway (inc.) | 48,453 | 99.83 | Write-In | 84 | 0.17 |

== General election ==
=== Candidates ===
- William Cohen, U.S. Representative from Bangor
- Hayes Gahagan, former State Senator from Caribou (Independent)
- William Hathaway, incumbent United States Senator (Democratic)
- John J. Jannace (Independent)
- Plato Truman (Independent)

=== Campaign ===
During the campaign, all candidates hit the campaign trail hard, with Hathaway receiving significant support from Jimmy Carter, Edmund Muskie, Ted Kennedy, and other national Democrats. Shortly before election day, candidate Hayes Gahagan held a press conference to announce that "unknown, subversive agents" had defaced his campaign brochures with subliminal sexual messages that could only be picked up subconsciously, including crude scratches of the word sex and female genitalia hidden in his hairline. "This is no joke," he said. "It's a national scandal, and I'm not the only candidate." Independent observers were unable to confirm the presence of the supposed messages, and the incident caused Gahagan to lose support.

=== Results ===
United States Senate election in Maine, 1978
| Party | Candidate | Votes | % | ±% |
|---|---|---|---|---|
| Republican | William Cohen | 212,294 | 56.59% | +9.83% |
| Democratic | William Hathaway (incumbent) | 127,327 | 33.94% | −19.29% |
| Independent | Hayes E. Gahagan | 27,824 | 7.42% | |
| Independent | John J. Jannace | 5,553 | 1.48% | |
| Independent | Plato Truman | 2,116 | 0.56% | |
| Majority | | 84,967 | 22.65% | +16.19% |
| Turnout | | 375,114 | | |
| Republican gain from Democratic | | Swing | | |

== See also ==
- 1978 United States Senate elections
