= Robert A. G. Monks =

American author and activist (1933–2025)

Chairman of the Maine Republican Party
- In office 1977–1978
- Preceded by: John R. Linnell
- Succeeded by: Hattie M. Bickmore

Personal details
- Born: Robert Augustus Gardner Monks; December 4, 1933 Boston, Massachusetts, U.S.
- Died: April 29, 2025 (aged 91) Cape Elizabeth, Maine, U.S.
- Party: Republican
- Spouse: Millicent Carnegie Sprague (m. 1954; died 2023)
- Children: 2
- Education: Harvard University; Cambridge University
- Known for: Shareholder activism

Robert Augustus Gardner Monks (December 4, 1933 – April 29, 2025) was an American author, shareholder activist, corporate governance advocate, attorney, corporate director, venture capitalist and energy company executive — as well as political candidate and Reagan administration official.

Monks co-founded Institutional Shareholder Services, Lens Investment Management, Lens Governance Advisors and The Corporate Library (now part of GMI Ratings). He authored The Emperor’s Nightmare, Corpocracy, Citizens DisUnited, Reel and Rout: A Novel, The New Global Investors and, with Nell Minow, Watching the Watchers, Corporate Governance and Power & Accountability.

He was the Republican nominee for the U.S. Senate from Maine in 1976, losing in a landslide to Democratic Senator Edmund Muskie. He again ran for Senate in 1996, but lost that Republican primary to Susan Collins. He also unsuccessfully challenged longtime Republican Senator Margaret Chase Smith in the 1972 Republican primary. In 1977, Monks was named Chair of the Maine Republican Party. He resigned as party chair in 1978.

== Early life and education ==
Monks was born in Boston on December 4, 1933. He was the son of Rev. G. Gardner Monks and Katharine Knowles. Rev. Monks was the founding headmaster of Lenox School for Boys and Canon of the Washington Cathedral.

A cousin of Monks' grandmother- from whom came his second name- was the politician Augustus Gardner. Monks was educated at St. Paul's School, Harvard College, Cambridge University and Harvard Law School. At Cambridge, he was a member of the winning Cambridge University Boat Club boat in the 1955 edition of The Boat Race, a traditional competition between Cambridge and Oxford Universities.

== Career ==
"Each one of us needs to ask what we can contribute. I’ve tried to expose the illusion of corporate democracy. It’s a cost to all of us."

After graduating from law school, Monks became a partner in a law firm in Boston from 1958 to 1965. He was vice president of his family's Gardner Associates and then was president and CEO of C.H. Sprague & Son, a coal and oil company. In 1976, he was made a board member Board of The Boston Safe Deposit & Trust Company and the Boston Company. He was chairman from 1979 to 1981. Ronald Reagan appointed him as director of the United States Synthetic Fuels Corporation and as one of the founding Trustees of the Federal Employees' Retirement System.

Appointed as the Administrator of the Office of Pension and Welfare Benefit Programs at the US Department of Labor in December 1983, Monks propounded the view that pension fund managers had an obligation to exercise their voting rights in ways that further the interests of their beneficiaries. It was adopted as Labor Department guidance eventually. Monks continued his advocacy of activist shareholding by founding Institutional Shareholding Services on leaving the department in 1985.

Monks wrote widely about corporate governance and published more than a hundred papers in publications around the world. He was the recipient of the Award for Outstanding Financial Executive from the Financial Management Association in 2007.

Monks is the subject of a biography chronicling the corporate governance movement, A Traitor to His Class by Hilary Rosenberg.

In The Corporation, a 2003 documentary film, Monks was interviewed about issues of corporations including how their profit models historically involve being "lean, mean, externalizing machines." He said "The corporation is an externalizing machine, in the same way that a shark is a killing machine."

"I couldn’t think of anyone connected with the company emitting the effluent who wanted the result I saw."

== Personal life and death ==
Monks lived on an island in Cape Elizabeth, Maine, with his wife, née Millicent Carnegie Sprague (d. 2023), great-granddaughter of Thomas Carnegie, the younger brother of Andrew Carnegie. The couple married in 1954 and had two children.

Monks continued to affiliate with the Republican Party but was increasingly distant from it in his later years. He supported Barack Obama's re-election in 2012.

Monks died from pancreatic cancer at his home, on April 29, 2025, at the age of 91.

== Electoral history ==
=== 1972 ===
1972 United States Senate election in Maine Republican Primary
Party	Candidate	Votes	%
Republican	Margaret Smith	76,964	66.746%
Republican	Robert Monks	38,345	33.254%
Total votes		115,309	100%

=== 1976 ===
1976 United States Senate election in Maine
Party	Candidate	Votes	%
Democratic	Edmund Muskie	292,704	60.203%
Republican	Robert Monks	193,489	39.797%
Total votes		486,193	100%

=== 1996 ===
1996 United States Senate election in Maine Republican Primary
Party	Candidate	Votes	%
Republican	Susan Collins	53,339	55.519%
Republican	W. John Hathaway	29,792	31.009%
Republican	Robert Monks	12,943	13.472%
Total votes		96,074	100%

== Bibliography ==
- Power & Accountability. HarperCollins, 1991. (with Nell Minow)
- Watching the Watchers. Capstone, 1996. (with Nell Minow)
- The Emperor's Nightingale. Saint Simons Island, Georgia: Brook Street, 1999.
- The New Global Investors. Capstone, 2001.
- Capitalism Without Owners Will Fail: A Policymaker's Guide to Reform. London: CSFI, 2002. (with Allen Sykes)
- Reel and Rout. Saint Simons Island, Georgia: Brook Street, 2004.
- Corpocracy. New York; Wiley, 2007.
- Corporate Valuation for Portfolio Investment. London: Wiley, 2010. (with Alexandra Lajoux)
- Corporate Governance (5th Revised Edition). London: Wiley, 2011. (with Nell Minow)
- Citizens DisUnited: Passive Investors, Drone CEOs, and the Corporate Capture of the American Dream. 2013.

== See also ==
- List of Cambridge University Boat Race crews
- Nell Minow

== Sources ==
- Hart, Joanne. "Bob Monks: Ungoverned companies are like doped horses." (Reach April 2005)
- Geraciot, David A. "Bob Monks' Thirty-year Crusade." (Registered Rep. February 2003)

Party political offices
Preceded by Neil S. Bishop	Republican nominee for U.S. Senator from Maine (Class 1); 1976	Succeeded by David F. Emery
Preceded by John R. Linnell	Chairman of the Maine Republican Party; 1977–1978	Succeeded by Hattie M. Bickmore
