= 1996 United States Senate election in Maine =

- November 5, 1996
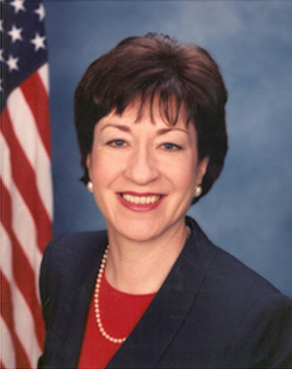

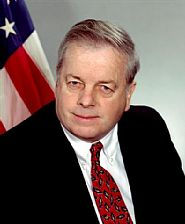
Nominee	Susan Collins	Joseph E. Brennan
Party	Republican	Democratic
Popular vote	298,422	266,226
Percentage	49.18%	43.88%
- Collins: 40–50% 50–60% 60–70% 70–80% 80–90% >90% Brennan: 40–50% 50–60% 60–70% 70–80% Tie: 40–50%
U.S. senator before election
William Cohen
Republican
Elected U.S. Senator
Susan Collins
Republican

The 1996 United States Senate election in Maine was held November 5, 1996. Incumbent Republican U.S. Senator William Cohen was tapped by the Clinton administration to serve as Secretary of Defense. To replace him, U.S. Representative Joseph E. Brennan won the Democratic primary while political consultant Susan Collins won the Republican primary. A competitive general election ensued, but Collins ultimately won out over Brennan, keeping the seat in the Republican column. With Collins' election to the Senate in 1996, Maine became the third state after California and Kansas to have two sitting female senators, and the first to have two elected female Republican senators.

Brennan and Collins both ran in the 1994 gubernatorial election, and each won their respective party's nomination, but lost the general election to independent Angus King, who would be elected in Maine's other Senate seat in 2012 and become a Senator in 2013, serving alongside Collins.

Following his departure from the Senate, Cohen was appointed United States Secretary of Defense by President Bill Clinton from 1997 to 2001.

This was the last U.S. Senate election in Maine to see a Democrat carry any Maine county until 2020, when Collins lost Cumberland and Knox counties to Sara Gideon; Collins was re-elected in 16-county landslides in 2002, 2008, and 2014, while Maine's other seat saw similar 16-county landslides for Republican Olympia Snowe in 2000 and 2006 and for Independent Angus King in 2012.

== Democratic primary ==
=== Candidates ===
- Joseph E. Brennan, former U.S. Representative from Maine's 1st congressional district and former Governor of Maine
- Jean Hay Bright, activist
- Sean Faircloth, State Senator
- Jerald Leonard
- Richard A. Spencer, former congressional candidate

=== Results ===
Democratic primary results
Party	Candidate	Votes	%
Democratic	Joseph E. Brennan	48,335	56.68%
Democratic	Sean Faircloth	21,204	24.87%
Democratic	Richard A. Spencer	10,236	12.00%
Democratic	Jean Hay Bright	4,524	5.31%
Democratic	Jerald Leonard	939	1.10%
Democratic	Write-ins	35	0.04%
Total votes		85,273	100.00%

== Republican primary ==
Shortly before the primary, allegations emerged in The Boston Globe, Portland Press Herald, and Bangor Daily News that state senator W. John Hathaway had sex with his twelve-year-old babysitter on multiple occasions in 1990. Hathaway vehemently denied the allegations, and blamed opponent Robert A.G. Monks for planting the story, though the mother of the girl corroborated it. Monks admitted to sending a private investigator to Hathaway's former residence of Huntsville, Alabama to look into the story. Ultimately, both stories proved to benefit Susan Collins, who won over 55% of the primary vote.

=== Candidates ===
- Susan Collins, former Deputy Treasurer of Massachusetts and nominee for Governor in 1994
- W. John Hathaway, State Senator
- Robert A. G. Monks, nominee for the United States Senate in 1976

=== Results ===
Republican primary results
Party	Candidate	Votes	%
Republican	Susan Collins	53,339	55.50%
Republican	W. John Hathaway	29,792	31.00%
Republican	Robert A. G. Monks	12,943	13.47%
Republican	Write-ins	33	0.03%
Total votes		96,107	100.00%

== General election ==
=== Results ===

United States Senate election in Maine, 1996
Party	Candidate	Votes	%	±%
Republican	Susan Collins	298,422	49.18%	−12.16%
Democratic	Joseph E. Brennan	266,226	43.88%	+5.24%
Independent	John Rensenbrink	23,441	3.86%	N/A
Constitution	William P. Clarke	18,618	3.07%	N/A
Write-in		70	0.01%	N/A
Majority		32,196	5.31%	−17.39%
Turnout		606,777		
Republican hold				

==== Results by county ====
County	Susan Collins Republican		Joseph Brennan Democratic		All others		Margin		Total votes cast
County	#	%	#	%	#	%	#	%	Total votes cast
Androscoggin	20,881	44.0%	22,888	48.3%	3,654	7.7%	-2,007	-4.3%	47,423
Aroostook	19,269	55.4%	13,462	38.7%	2,072	5.9%	5,807	16.7%	34,803
Cumberland	59,647	46.0%	60,979	47.0%	9,163	7.0%	-1,332	-1.0%	129,789
Franklin	7,000	47.9%	6,612	45.3%	1,000	6.8%	388	2.6%	14,612
Hancock	14,602	55.4%	9,504	36.0%	2,270	8.6%	5,098	19.4%	26,376
Kennebec	25,375	45.3%	26,849	47.9%	3,843	6.8%	-1,474	-2.6%	56,067
Knox	9,516	51.0%	7,416	39.8%	1,724	9.3%	2,100	11.2%	18,656
Lincoln	9,859	53.9%	6,986	38.2%	1,446	7.9%	2,873	15.7%	18,291
Oxford	12,482	47.7%	11,929	45.6%	1,747	6.7%	553	2.1%	26,158
Penobscot	38,865	55.1%	27,814	39.4%	3,831	5.4%	11,051	15.7%	70,510
Piscataquis	5,057	56.3%	3,429	38.2%	494	5.5%	1,628	18.1%	8,980
Sagadahoc	8,119	48.5%	6,989	41.7%	1,648	9.8%	1,130	6.8%	16,756
Somerset	10,742	46.8%	10,730	46.7%	1,501	6.6%	12	0.1%	22,973
Waldo	9,235	53.6%	6,415	37.2%	1,577	9.1%	2,820	16.4%	17,227
Washington	8,233	53.8%	5,981	39.1%	1,077	7.0%	2,252	14.7%	15,291
York	39,822	47.9%	38,231	46.0%	5,079	6.1%	1,591	1.9%	83,132
Totals	298,422	49.2%	266,226	43.9%	42,129	6.9%	32,196	5.3%	606,777

Counties that flipped from Republican to Democratic

- Androscoggin
- Cumberland
- Kennebec

== See also ==
- 1996 United States Senate elections
