= 2020 United States Senate election in Maine =

- November 3, 2020
- Turnout: 75.8%
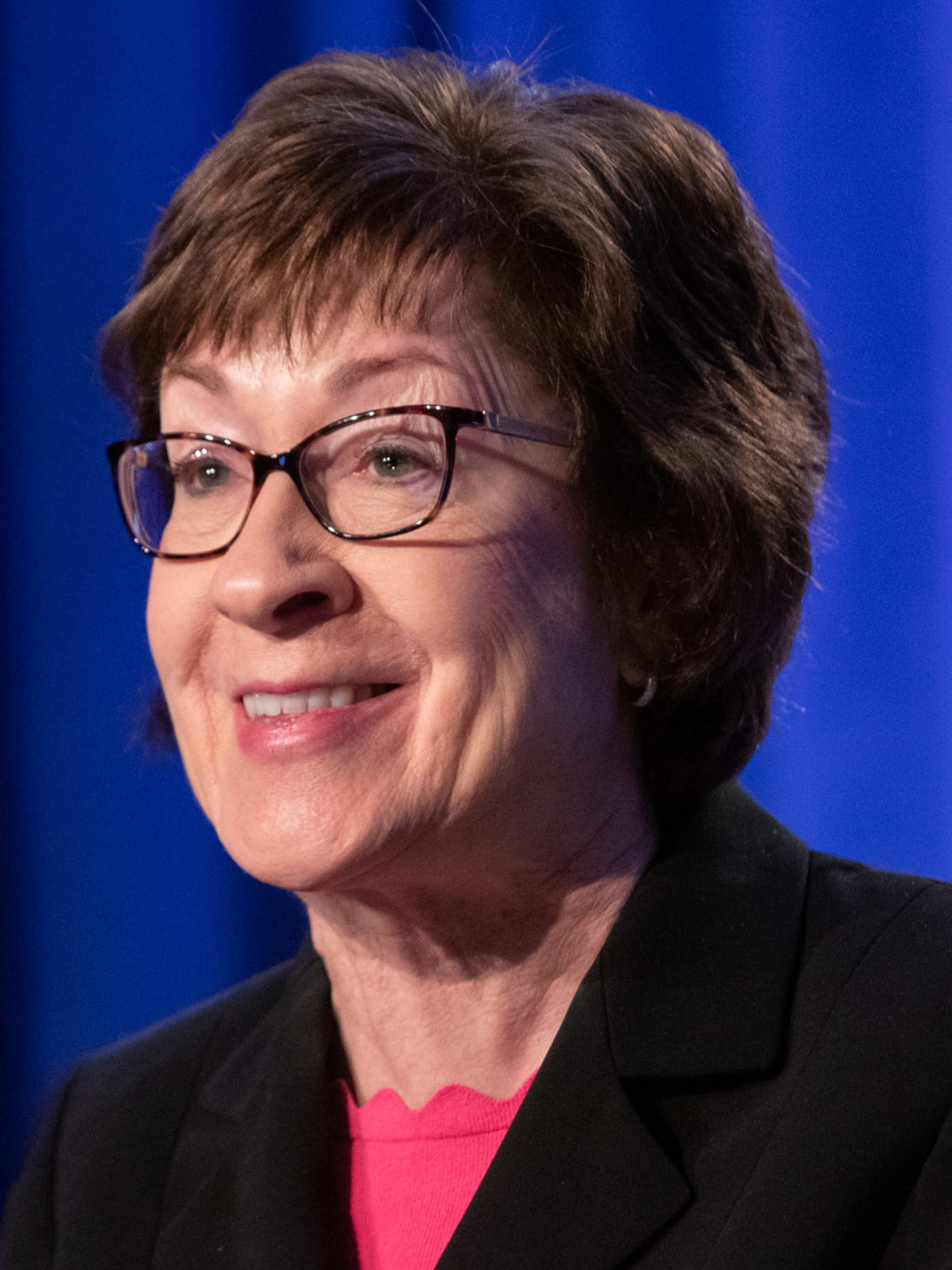

Nominee	Susan Collins	Sara Gideon
Party	Republican	Democratic
Popular vote	417,645	347,223
Percentage	50.98%	42.39%
- Collins: 40–50% 50–60% 60–70% 70–80% 80–90% >90% Gideon: 40–50% 50–60% 60–70% 70–80% Tie: 50%
U.S. senator before election
Susan Collins
Republican
Elected U.S. Senator
Susan Collins
Republican

The 2020 United States Senate election in Maine was held on November 3, 2020, to elect a member of the United States Senate to represent the state of Maine. Republican incumbent Susan Collins won re-election to a fifth term, defeating Democratic state House speaker Sara Gideon.

The race became the most expensive in Maine's history, with Collins spending $23 million and Gideon $48 million. It also had national implications, as defeating Collins was a key part of the Democrats' strategy to achieve a Senate majority. While Gideon led Collins in nearly every public poll, Collins unexpectedly defeated Gideon by 8.6 points on election day. Collins outperformed Republican President Donald Trump, who lost the state to Democratic nominee Joe Biden by more than nine percent. Maine was the only state to elect a senator of a different party than the winner of its presidential contest in the November 3 election.

Maine used a ranked choice voting system in the 2020 U.S. Senate election, as established by a 2016 referendum. Because Collins won a majority of the first-place votes cast, no additional vote tabulation rounds were needed. This was the first Senate election in Maine since 1996 where Democrats won a county.

== Background ==
Republican U.S. Senator Susan Collins ran for a fifth term. Collins had won each election to this seat by a greater victory margin than the one before it. Observers did not expect this election to continue that trend.

Collins was criticized for her decision to vote to confirm Brett Kavanaugh to the United States Supreme Court despite his anti-abortion stances (Collins is pro-choice) and allegations of sexual misconduct and abuse against him, though she gave a highly publicized speech on the Senate floor explaining her reasoning. She also faced criticism for her stance on the impeachment of President Donald Trump. Collins voted in favor of allowing witness testimony in the Senate trial, and was the first Republican to do so, and she voted to acquit Trump on both charges of abuse of power and obstruction of Congress. She said she voted to acquit because "impeachment of a president should be reserved for conduct that poses such a serious threat to our governmental institutions as to warrant the extreme step of immediate removal from office." She initially claimed that Trump "learned a pretty big lesson" from the impeachment, but later said that she thought he had not learned from it after all. She was also criticized for running for third, fourth, and fifth Senate terms despite vowing to serve no more than two terms during her 1996 campaign, though she has explained this as a product of having learned the value of seniority in the Senate. The emphasis on seniority became a key theme of her campaign. Collins was widely considered one of the two least conservative Republican U.S. senators (the other being Lisa Murkowski).

During Trump's presidency, Collins's stance on Trump waffled, as he did not share her moderate politics but had a strong base in Maine's sprawling, rural 2nd congressional district. Collins voted against the Affordable Care Act repeal, but for the GOP's 2017 tax bill and to acquit Trump in his first impeachment. She voted to confirm Trump's nominees Brett Kavanaugh and Neil Gorsuch to the Supreme Court but against the confirmation of Amy Coney Barrett just days before the 2020 election, citing disagreement with process.

The Democratic nominee, Speaker of the Maine House of Representatives Sara Gideon, supported criminal justice reforms, expansion of the Affordable Care Act, rejoining the Paris Climate Accord, and imposing universal background checks on gun sales to combat gun violence. In 2019, Gideon faced an election ethics complaint for accepting reimbursements for her political donations from her own PAC. Gideon apologized for the violation, reimbursed the federal government a total of $3,250, and closed the PAC. Gideon was also criticized for keeping the Maine House of Representatives adjourned for most of the year (neighboring New Hampshire had reconvened its sizably larger legislature by late spring) and for allegedly turning a blind eye to a legislative colleague accused of molesting underage girls until she was forced to acknowledge the scandal.

Lisa Savage, an antiwar activist and schoolteacher from Solon, initially sought the Maine Green Independent Party nomination, but in late February, she announced her intention to instead qualify for the ballot as an independent due to Maine's ballot access measures.

Max Linn, a financial planner and conservative activist from Bar Harbor, was a Trump supporter and former candidate of the Republican and Reform parties. In July 2020, he qualified for the ballot as an independent. Former Republican state senator Mary Small challenged the signatures on his petition, but the secretary of state found that he had enough and he was placed on the ballot. Later that month, he announced his intention to drop out of the race to support Collins. But days later, he decided not to drop out unless Collins agreed to a list of policies, which she did not.

Party primaries were initially scheduled to take place on June 9, but due to the COVID-19 pandemic and its impact on the state, Governor Janet Mills rescheduled them for July 14. Mills's executive order also expanded voters' ability to request absentee ballots, which could then be done up to and on election day. The primaries were conducted with ranked choice voting. Parties qualified to participate in the 2020 primary election were the Democratic Party, the Republican Party, and the Maine Green Independent Party.

== Republican primary ==
=== Candidates ===
==== Nominee ====
- Susan Collins, incumbent U.S. senator

==== Eliminated in primary ====
- Amy Colter, law office manager (write-in candidate)

==== Withdrawn ====
- Derek Levasseur, police officer

==== Declined ====
- Paul LePage, former governor of Maine (endorsed Collins)
- Max Linn, financial planner, Reform nominee for governor of Florida in 2006, Democratic candidate for Florida's 10th congressional district in 2008 and disqualified candidate for U.S. Senate in 2018 (qualified for the general election as Independent)
- Bruce Poliquin, former U.S. representative for Maine's 2nd congressional district and former treasurer of Maine

=== Polling ===
Poll source	Date(s) administered	Sample size (Note: Key: A – all adults RV – registered voters LV – likely voters V – unclear)	Margin of error	Susan Collins	Derek Levasseur	Undecided
Public Policy Polling (D)	October 11–13, 2019	271 (LV)	± 6%	55%	10%	34%

Hypothetical polling

with Susan Collins and Paul LePage

Poll source	Date(s) administered	Sample size	Margin of error	Susan Collins	Paul LePage	Undecided
Public Policy Polling (D)	October 11–13, 2019	271 (LV)	± 6%	29%	63%	8%

with Susan Collins and Shawn Moody

Poll source	Date(s) administered	Sample size	Margin of error	Susan Collins	Shawn Moody	Undecided
Public Policy Polling (D)	October 11–13, 2019	271 (LV)	± 6%	36%	45%	18%

with Susan Collins and generic Republican if Collins supported impeaching Trump

Poll source	Date(s) administered	Sample size	Margin of error	Susan Collins	Generic Republican	Undecided
Public Policy Polling (D)	October 11–13, 2019	271 (LV)	± 6%	35%	55%	10

with Susan Collins and Derek Levasseur if Collins supported impeaching Trump

Poll source	Date(s) administered	Sample size	Margin of error	Susan Collins	Derek Levasseur	Undecided
Public Policy Polling (D)	October 11–13, 2019	271 (LV)	± 6%	37%	24%	39%

with Susan Collins and generic Republican

Poll source	Date(s) administered	Sample size	Margin of error	Susan Collins	Generic Republican	Undecided
Public Policy Polling (D)	October 11–13, 2019	271 (LV)	± 6%	53%	38%	9%

=== Results ===
Republican primary results
Party	Candidate	Votes	%
Republican	Susan Collins (incumbent)	87,375	98.79%
Republican	Amy Colter (write-in)	1,073	1.21%
Total votes		88,448	100.0%

== Democratic primary ==
On April 20, 2019, attorney and activist Bre Kidman became the first person to announce their candidacy for the Democratic nomination. If elected, they would have been the first ever non-binary U.S. senator. On June 13, 2019, former Maine gubernatorial candidate Betsy Sweet declared her candidacy. Eleven days later, Maine House Speaker Sara Gideon announced her candidacy, receiving widespread media coverage. General Jon Treacy had previously announced his candidacy before withdrawing. Former Google executive and political aide Ross LaJeunesse, who would have been the first openly gay man elected to the Senate, announced his candidacy in November 2019. He received the endorsement of the national political group the Victory Fund in January 2020. LaJeunesse withdrew from the race in March 2020, citing the inability to continue his strategy of campaigning in person due to the COVID-19 pandemic, and endorsed Gideon. Two debates were held with all three candidates, while one hosted by WCSH was attended only by Sweet and Kidman.

=== Candidates ===
==== Nominee ====
- Sara Gideon, speaker of the Maine House of Representatives

==== Eliminated in primary ====
- Bre Kidman, attorney, activist, and artist
- Betsy Sweet, activist, former director of the Maine Women's Lobby, and candidate for governor of Maine in 2018

==== Withdrawn ====
- Michael Bunker, travel agent
- Christine Gates
- Ross LaJeunesse, former head of international relations at Google, former aide to George J. Mitchell, Ted Kennedy, Steve Westly and Arnold Schwarzenegger (endorsed Gideon)
- Cathleen London, physician and member of the Maine Democratic Party State Committee
- Jon Treacy, retired U.S. Air Force major general

==== Declined ====
- Shenna Bellows, state senator and nominee for U.S. Senate in 2014
- Seth Berry, state representative (endorsed Gideon)
- Emily Cain, executive director of EMILY's List, nominee for Maine's 2nd congressional district in 2014 and 2016, former state senator, and former state representative
- Adam Cote, candidate for Maine's 1st congressional district in 2008 and candidate for governor of Maine in 2018
- Matthew Dunlap, Maine secretary of state and candidate for U.S. Senate in 2012
- Jared Golden, incumbent U.S. representative for Maine's 2nd congressional district and former state representative
- James Howaniec, former mayor of Lewiston
- Stephen King, author (endorsed Gideon)
- Daniel Kleban, businessman
- Janet Mills, governor of Maine and former attorney general of Maine
- Chellie Pingree, incumbent U.S. representative for Maine's 1st congressional district and nominee for the U.S. Senate in 2002
- Hannah Pingree, former Speaker of the Maine House of Representatives (endorsed Gideon)
- Susan Rice, former United States National Security Advisor and former United States Ambassador to the United Nations
- Cecile Richards, former president of Planned Parenthood
- Zak Ringelstein, schoolteacher and nominee for U.S. Senate in 2018 (endorsed Sweet)
- Rosa Scarcelli, businesswoman and candidate for governor of Maine in 2010
- Ethan Strimling, former mayor of Portland and candidate for Maine's 1st congressional district in 2008

=== Polling ===
Poll source	Date(s) administered	Sample size	Margin of error	Sara Gideon	Betsy Sweet	Other / Undecided
Victory Geek (D)	May 13–18, 2020	– (LV) (Note: Likely primary voter subsample of 306 likely general election Democratic voters)	–	67%	17%	17% (Note: Undecided with 17%)
Colby College/SocialSphere	February 10–13, 2020	383 (LV)	–	60%	8%	33% (Note: Undecided with 31%; LaJeunesse with 0%; "another candidate" with 2%)

=== Results ===
Results by county Gideon: 60–70%; 70–80%

Democratic primary results
Party	Candidate	Votes	%
Democratic	Sara Gideon	116,264	71.47%
Democratic	Betsy Sweet	37,327	22.94%
Democratic	Bre Kidman	9,090	5.59%
Total votes		162,681	100.0%

== Other candidates ==
=== Green Independent Party ===
Two candidates declared their intentions to run for the Maine Green Independent Party's nomination, but one withdrew and the other left the party to become an independent. Lisa Savage left the party because of Maine's ballot access requirements; Savage needed 2,000 registered party members to sign a nomination petition to appear on the ballot as the Green Party candidate but could only gather them from January 1 until the March 15 deadline. The Green Party had roughly 41,000 members statewide, which was significantly fewer than the Democratic and Republican parties but nonetheless required the same number of signatures. No alternative party candidate for statewide office had been able to meet this requirement since Pat LaMarche did so in 2006 for governor. Instead, Savage sought to appear as an independent candidate, which required 4,000 signatures, but they may be from any registered voter, not just party members, and they could have been gathered until the June deadline.

==== Withdrawn ====
- David Gibson, solar design specialist (endorsed Savage)
- Lisa Savage, school teacher (switched to independent)

=== Write-in candidates ===
- Tiffany Bond, lawyer and candidate for Maine's 2nd congressional district in 2018
- Ian Kenton Engelman
- Douglas E. Fogg

=== Independents ===
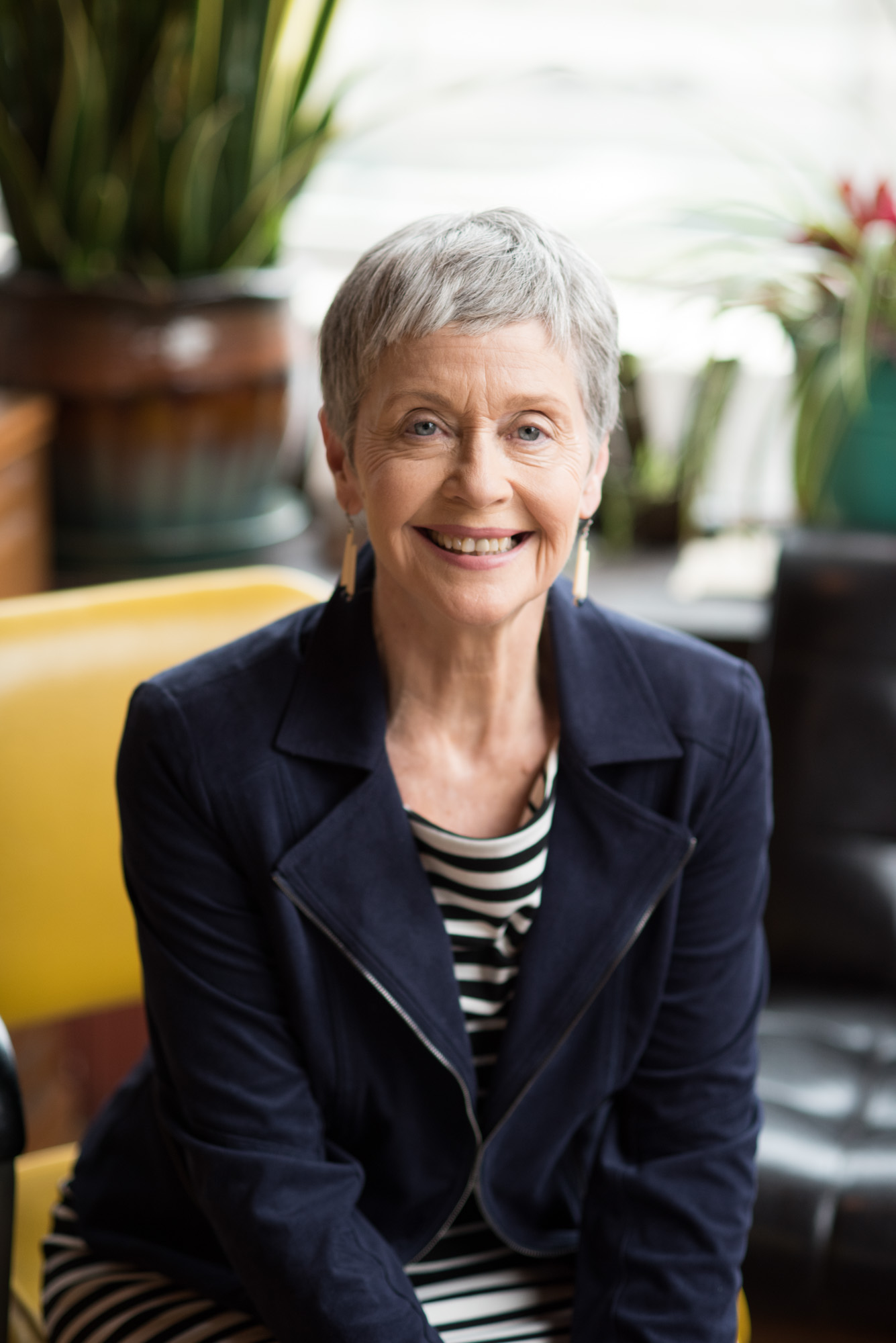
Independent Lisa Savage is a peace activist and retired schoolteacher from Solon, Maine.

Eight Independents declared their candidacy for Senate in 2020, including one affiliated with the Libertarian Party of Maine, which lost ballot access after the 2018 elections. Two qualified for positions on the November ballot.

==== Declared ====
- Max Linn, perennial candidate, financial planner, and disqualified Republican candidate for the 2018 United States Senate election in Maine
- Lisa Savage, peace activist and schoolteacher (switched from Green Independent candidacy)

==== Withdrawn ====
- Joshua Arnone, accounting clerk affiliated with the Libertarian Party of Maine
- Steven Golieb, Millinocket town councilor
- Leigh Hawes, truck driver
- Danielle VanHelsing, LGBTQ rights activist
- Linda Wooten, vocational educator and conservative activist

== General election ==
=== Predictions ===
Source	Ranking	As of
The Cook Political Report	Tossup	October 29, 2020
Inside Elections	Tilt D (flip)	October 28, 2020
Sabato's Crystal Ball	Lean D (flip)	November 2, 2020
Daily Kos	Tossup	October 30, 2020
Politico	Tossup	November 2, 2020
RCP	Tossup	October 23, 2020
DDHQ	Lean D (flip)	November 3, 2020
538	Tossup	November 2, 2020
Economist	Lean D (flip)	November 2, 2020

=== Debates ===
The four candidates participated in two in-person debates on September 11 and September 29, both held without an audience. Collins at one point proposed holding 16 debates, one for every county in Maine, but such a schedule was not agreed upon.

2020 United States Senate election in Maine debates
N°	Date	Moderator	Participants			
Key: P Participant. NI Not invited.			Republican	Democratic	Independent	Independent
Key: P Participant. NI Not invited.			United States Senator Susan Collins	Maine House Speaker Sara Gideon	Financial planner Max Linn	Public schoolteacher Lisa Savage
1	Friday, September 11, 2020	Pat Callaghan; Rachel Ohm; Michael Shepherd	P	P	P	P
2	Tuesday, September 29, 2020	Kelly O'Mara; Jason Parent	P	P	P	P
3	Thursday, October 15, 2020	Jennifer Rooks; Steve Mistler; Mal Leary	P	P	P	P
4	Thursday, October 22, 2020	Pat Callaghan	P	P	P	P
5	Wednesday, October 28, 2020	Steve Bottari	P	P	NI	NI

=== Endorsements ===
Susan Collins (R)

Executive branch officials

- George W. Bush, former president of the United States (2001–2009)
- William Cohen, former secretary of defense (1997–2001)
- Donald Trump, president of the United States (2017–2021) and 2020 presidential nominee

U.S. senators

- Lindsey Graham, South Carolina (2003–2026)
- Joe Lieberman, former Connecticut (1989–2013) (independent; Democratic until 2006)
- Joe Manchin, West Virginia (2010–2025) (Democratic)

Statewide officials

- Charlie Baker, governor of Massachusetts (2015–2023)
- Larry Hogan, governor of Maryland (2015–2023)
- Paul LePage, former governor of Maine (2011–2019)

Individuals

- Laura Bush, former first lady of the United States (2001–2009)

Organizations

- Maggie's List
- Maine Fraternal Order of Police
Sara Gideon (D)

Executive branch officials

- Joe Biden, former vice president of the United States (2009–2017) and 2020 presidential nominee
- Barack Obama, former president of the United States (2009–2017)

U.S. senators

- Catherine Cortez Masto, Nevada (2017–present)
- Tammy Duckworth, Illinois (2017–present)
- Kirsten Gillibrand, New York (2009–present)
- Kamala Harris, California (2017–2021) and 2020 vice-presidential nominee
- Chris Murphy, Connecticut (2013–present)
- Elizabeth Warren, Massachusetts (2013–present)

U.S. representatives

- Chellie Pingree, ME-01 (2009–present)

Statewide officials

- Janet Mills, governor of Maine (2019–present)

State legislators

- Stacey Abrams, former Democratic leader of the Georgia House of Representatives, 2018 nominee for governor of Georgia

Individuals

- Stephen King, author
- Ross LaJeunesse, former aide to George J. Mitchell, Ted Kennedy, Steve Westly and Arnold Schwarzenegger

Organizations

- Asian American Action Fund
- Bend the Arc: Jewish Action
- CAPA21
- Council for a Livable World
- Democratic Majority for Israel
- Emerge America
- Everytown for Gun Safety
- Feminist Majority PAC
- J Street PAC
- Joint Action Committee for Political Affairs
- NARAL
- National Organization for Women
- Natural Resources Defense Council Action Fund
- Planned Parenthood
- Population Connection
- Sierra Club
- Voter Protection Project
- Women's Political Committee

Unions

- Carpenters Local 349
- Carpenters Local 352
- Heat and Frost Insulators Local 6
- International Union of Operating Engineers
- Maine State Association of Letter Carriers
- United Food and Commercial Workers Local 791
- United Food and Commercial Workers Local 1445
Lisa Savage (I)

Organizations

- RootsAction

Newspapers

- Mainer
Declined to endorse
- Jared Golden, ME-02 (2019–present) (Democratic)

=== Fundraising ===
Campaign finance reports as of December 30, 2020
Candidate	Raised	Spent	Cash on hand
Sara Gideon (D)	$75,629,137	$64,069,682	$11,559,504
Susan Collins (R)	$30,783,433	$30,417,004	$1,295,192
Source: Federal Election Commission

=== Polling ===
==== Graphical summary ====
View source data.

==== Aggregate polls ====
Sara Gideon vs. Susan Collins
Source of poll aggregation	Dates administered	Dates updated	Sara Gideon	Susan Collins	Other/undecided (Note: Calculated by taking the difference of 100% and all other candidates combined.)	Margin
270 to Win	October 6 – November 1, 2020	November 3, 2020	46.4%	42.6%	11.0%	Gideon +3.8
Real Clear Politics	September 10–23, 2020	September 25, 2020	48.5%	42.0%	9.5%	Gideon +6.5

Poll source	Date(s) administered	Sample size	Margin of error	Susan Collins (R)	Sara Gideon (D)	Lisa Savage (I)	Other / Undecided
Change Research	October 29 – November 2, 2020	1,024 (LV)	± 3.5%	42% (Note: Standard VI response)	46%	7%	5% (Note: Linn (I) with 2%; "Don't recall", would not vote, and Undecided with 1%; Did not vote with 0%)
Change Research	October 29 – November 2, 2020	1,024 (LV)	± 3.5%	46% (Note: With 3 rounds of Ranked Choice Voting)	54%	–	–
Emerson College	October 29–31, 2020	611 (LV)	± 3.9%	46% (Note: With voters who lean towards a given candidate)	48%	5%	5% (Note: Linn (I) and "Someone else" with 1%; Undecided with 4%)
Emerson College	October 29–31, 2020	611 (LV)	± 3.9%	47% (Note: Reassigning the second preferences of Linn, Savage and "Someone else" voters)	51%	–	5% (Note: "No second choice" and "Someone else" with 1%; Undecided with 4%)
SurveyUSA	October 23–27, 2020	1007 (LV)	± 3.7%	45%	46%	4%	5% (Note: Linn (I) with 1%; Undecided with 4%)
SurveyUSA	October 23–27, 2020	1007 (LV)	± 3.7%	49% (Note: With Ranked Choice Voting)	51%	–	–
Colby College	October 21–25, 2020	879 (LV)	± 3.3%	43%	47%	5%	5% (Note: Linn (I) with 2%; Undecided with 4%)
Colby College	October 21–25, 2020	879 (LV)	± 3.3%	44% (Note: Reassigning the second preferences of Savage voters)	49%	–	7% (Note: Linn (I) with 3%; Undecided with 4%)
Pan Atlantic Research	October 2–6, 2020	600 (LV)	± 4.5%	40%	47%	5%	8% (Note: Linn (I) with 2%; Undecided with 6%)
Pan Atlantic Research	October 2–6, 2020	600 (LV)	± 4.5%	41% (Note: Reassigning the second preferences of Linn and Savage voters)	49%	1%	9% (Note: Linn (I) with 2%; Undecided with 8%)
Critical Insights	September 25 – October 4, 2020	466 (LV)	± 4.4%	43%	44%	3%	11% (Note: Linn (I), "Someone else" and "Refused" with 1%; would not vote with 0%; Undecided with 7%)
Critical Insights	September 25 – October 4, 2020	466 (LV)	± 4.4%	43%	46%	1%	10% (Note: "No second preference" and "Refused" with 1%; Linn (I) and "Someone else" with 0%; Undecided with 7%)
Data for Progress (D)	September 23–28, 2020	718 (LV)	± 3.7%	41%	46%	3%	11% (Note: Linn (I) with 1%; Undecided with 10%)
Data for Progress (D)	September 23–28, 2020	718 (LV)	± 3.7%	42% (Note: If only Collins and Gideon were candidates)	50%	–	8% (Note: Undecided with 8%)
Colby College	September 17–23, 2020	847 (LV)	± 3.4%	41%	45%	3%	11% (Note: Linn (I) with 5%; Undecided with 6%)
Colby College	September 17–23, 2020	847 (LV)	± 3.4%	43%	47%	–	6% (Note: Undecided with 6%)
Moore Information (R) (Note: Poll sponsored by the NRSC, which exclusively supports Republican candidates in U.S. Senate elections.)	September 20–22, 2020	600 (LV)	–	42%	42%	–	9% (Note: Undecided with 9%)
Suffolk University	September 17–20, 2020	500 (LV)	± 4.4%	41%	46%	4%	7% (Note: Linn (I) with 2%; "Other" and "Refused" with 1%; Undecided with 5%)
Suffolk University	September 17–20, 2020	500 (LV)	± 4.4%	42% (Note: Assigning the second preferences of non-Collins/Gideon voters)	49%	1%	8% (Note: Linn (I) and "Refused" with 1%; "Other" with 0%; Undecided with 6%)
Siena College/NYT Upshot	September 11–16, 2020	663 (LV)	± 5.1%	40%	44%	2%	2% (Note: Linn (I) with 2%)
Siena College/NYT Upshot	September 11–16, 2020	663 (LV)	± 5.1%	44% (Note: Topline after Ranked Choice Voting is used)	49%	0%	7% (Note: Would not vote with 1%; Linn (I) and "someone else" with 0%; "Undecided/Refused" with 6%)
Quinnipiac University	September 10–14, 2020	1,183 (LV)	± 2.9%	42%	54%	–	4% (Note: "Someone else" with 1%; Undecided with 3%)
Citizen Data	September 4–7, 2020	600 (LV)	± 4%	41%	49%	1%	9% (Note: "Other" with 2%; Linn (I) with 0%; Undecided with 7%)
Fabrizio Ward/Hart Research Associates (Note: Poll sponsored by AARP.)	August 30 – September 5, 2020	800 (LV)	± 3.5%	43%	44%	6%	8% (Note: Would not vote with 1%; Undecided with 7%)
Fabrizio Ward/Hart Research Associates	August 30 – September 5, 2020	800 (LV)	± 3.5%	47%	48%	–	5% (Note: Would not vote with 1%; Undecided with 4%)
Public Policy Polling	August 13–14, 2020	571 (V)	± 4.1%	44%	49%	–	7% (Note: Undecided with 7%)
Critical Insights	July 28 – August 9, 2020	453 (LV)	± 4.3%	38%	43%	5%	15% (Note: "Refused" and would not vote with 1%; Undecided with 13%)
Critical Insights	July 28 – August 9, 2020	499 (RV)	± 4.3%	35%	43%	5%	18% (Note: Would not vote with 2%; "Refused" with 1%; Undecided with 14%)
Critical Insights	July 28 – August 9, 2020	499 (RV)	± 4.3%	37%	44%	1%	18% (Note: Would not vote with 2%; "Refused" with 1%; Undecided with 15%)
Quinnipiac University	July 30 – August 3, 2020	807 (RV)	± 3.5%	43%	47%	–	10% (Note: "Someone else" and would not vote with 2%; Undecided with 6%)
RMG Research	July 27 – August 2, 2020	500 (RV)	± 4.5%	41%	48%	–	11% (Note: Undecided with 11%)
Data for Progress	July 24 – August 2, 2020	866 (LV)	± 3.0%	45%	48%	–	7% (Note: "No one" with 7%)
Colby College/SocialSphere	July 18–24, 2020	888 (LV)	± 3.9%	39%	44%	–	18% (Note: "Minor party candidates" with 6%; Undecided with 12%)
Public Policy Polling	July 22–23, 2020	561 (V)	± 3.6%	42%	47%	–	11%
Public Policy Polling	July 2–3, 2020	1,022 (V)	± 3.1%	42%	46%	–	11%
Moore Information (R)	June 20–24, 2020 (Note: Additional data sourced from FiveThirtyEight)	600 (RV)	± 4.0%	45%	37%	3%	1% (Note: Linn (I) with 1%)
Victory Geek (D)	May 13–18, 2020	512 (LV)	± 4.3%	42%	51%	–	7%
Tarrance Group (R) (Note: Poll sponsored by the 1820 PAC.)	April 2020	– (Note: Not yet released)	–	48%	47%	–	5%
Public Policy Polling	March 2–3, 2020	872 (V)	± 3.3%	43%	47%	–	10% (Note: Undecided with 10%)
Colby College/SocialSphere	February 10–13, 2020	1,008 (LV)	± 3.1%	42%	43%	–	14% (Note: Undecided with 14%)
Fabrizio Ward	July 29–31, 2019	600 (LV)	± 4.0%	52%	35%	–	13% (Note: Undecided with 12%; "Would not vote/would not vote for US Senate" with 1%)
Gravis Marketing	June 24, 2019	767 (RV)	± 3.5%	44% (Note: First choice on an RCV ballot if the candidates were Collins, Gideon and VanHelsing (I))	30%	–	26% (Note: Undecided with 19%; VanHelsing with 7%)
Gravis Marketing	June 24, 2019	767 (RV)	± 3.5%	52%	36%	–	12% (Note: Undecided with 12%)
Pan Atlantic Research	March 4–13, 2019	500 (LV)	± 4.4%	51%	29%	–	20% (Note: "Other" with 12%; Undecided with 8%)

Hypothetical polling

with Betsy Sweet

Poll source	Date(s) administered	Sample size	Margin of error	Betsy Sweet (D)	Susan Collins (R)	Other / Undecided
Victory Geek (D)	May 13–18, 2020	512 (LV)	± 4.3%	44%	43%	10%

with Susan Rice

Poll source	Date(s) administered	Sample size	Margin of error	Susan Rice (D)	Susan Collins (R)	Other / Undecided
Emerson College	October 27–29, 2018	883 (LV) (Note: Using the likely voter screen for the 2018 U.S. Senate election in Maine)	± 3.5%	20%	44%	35%

with generic Democrat

Poll source	Date(s) administered	Sample size	Margin of error	Generic Democrat	Susan Collins (R)	Other / Undecided
Victory Geek (D)	May 13–18, 2020	512 (LV)	± 4.3%	49%	39%	12%
Colby College/SocialSphere	Feb 10–13, 2020	1,008 (LV)	± 3.1%	34%	40%	26%
Public Policy Polling	October 11–13, 2019	939 (V)	± 3.2%	44%	41%	15% (Note: Undecided with 15%)
Public Policy Polling	October 1–2, 2018	–	± 3.3%	34%	42%	–
Public Policy Polling (D) (Note: Poll sponsored by Our Lives on the Line)	August 28–29, 2017	501 (V)	–	21%	51%	27% (Note: Undecided with 27%)

with generic Democrat if Collins supports impeaching Donald Trump

Poll source	Date(s) administered	Sample size	Margin of error	Generic Democrat	Susan Collins (R)	Other / Undecided
Public Policy Polling	October 11–13, 2019	939 (V)	± 3.2%	38%	32%	30% (Note: Undecided with 30%)

with generic Democrat if Collins opposes impeaching Donald Trump

Poll source	Date(s) administered	Sample size	Margin of error	Generic Democrat	Susan Collins (R)	Other / Undecided
Public Policy Polling	October 11–13, 2019	939 (V)	± 3.2%	47%	40%	13% (Note: Undecided with 13%)

with Generic Opponent

Poll source	Date(s) administered	Sample size	Margin of error	Susan Collins (R)	Generic Opponent	Other / Undecided
Fabrizio Ward	July 29–31, 2019	600 (LV)	± 4.0%	38%	55%	7% (Note: "Refused" with 0%; Undecided with 7%)
Pan Atlantic Research	March 4–13, 2019	500 (LV)	± 4.4%	25%	27%	48% (Note: "Consider voting for Collins" with 40%; Undecided with 8%)

with Generic Republican and Generic Democrat

Poll source	Date(s) administered	Sample size	Margin of error	Generic Republican	Generic Democrat	Other / Undecided
Siena College/NYT Upshot	September 11–16, 2020	663 (LV)	± 5.1%	41%	53%	6% (Note: "Undecided/Refused" with 6%)
Quinnipiac University	September 10–14, 2020	1,183 (LV)	± 2.9%	40%	53%	7%
Fabrizio Ward	July 29–31, 2019	600 (LV)	± 4.0%	43%	42%	15% (Note: "Undecided/Don't know/Refused" with 15%)

=== Results ===
Collins defeated Gideon in the general election with 51.0% of the first-place votes. Maine used a ranked choice voting system in the election, as established by a 2016 referendum. Because Collins won a majority of the first-place votes cast, no additional rounds of vote tabulation rounds were needed. Gideon conceded the race to Collins on November 4.

United States Senate election in Maine, 2020
Party	Candidate	Votes	%	±%
Republican	Susan Collins (incumbent)	417,645	50.98%	−17.48%
Democratic	Sara Gideon	347,223	42.39%	+10.89%
Independent	Lisa Savage	40,579	4.95%	N/A
Independent	Max Linn	13,508	1.65%	N/A
Write-in		228	0.03%	–0.01%
Total votes		819,183	100.0%	N/A
Republican hold				

==== By county ====
County	Susan Collins Republican		Sara Gideon Democratic		Lisa Savage Independent		Max Linn Independent		Write-in		Margin		Total votes
County	#	%	#	%	#	%	#	%	#	%	#	%	Total votes
Androscoggin	32,979	56.19	22,181	37.79	2,438	4.15	1,090	1.86	2	0.00	10,798	18.40	58,690
Aroostook	24,033	67.51	9,750	27.39	1,072	3.01	743	2.09	3	0.01	14,283	40.12	35,601
Cumberland	74,592	38.45	105,308	54.29	11,907	6.14	2,138	1.10	39	0.02	-30,716	-15.83	193,984
Franklin	9,817	56.47	6,276	36.10	969	5.57	322	1.85	0	0.00	3,541	20.37	17,384
Hancock	17,371	49.19	15,379	43.55	1,821	5.16	736	2.08	8	0.02	1,992	5.64	35,315
Kennebec	39,481	54.92	27,664	38.49	3,407	4.74	1,324	1.84	10	0.01	11,817	16.44	71,886
Knox	11,705	45.44	12,190	47.32	1,461	5.67	399	1.55	3	0.01	-485	-1.88	25,758
Lincoln	12,075	51.08	10,102	42.73	1,111	4.70	349	1.48	3	0.01	1,973	8.35	23,640
Oxford	19,567	58.54	11,705	35.02	1,511	4.52	635	1.90	4	0.01	7,862	23.52	33,422
Penobscot	51,088	59.96	28,958	33.98	3,461	4.06	1,600	1.88	100	0.12	22,130	25.97	85,207
Piscataquis	6,603	66.95	2,655	26.92	394	3.99	210	2.13	0	0.00	3,948	40.03	9,862
Sagadahoc	11,558	48.08	10,787	44.87	1,354	5.63	337	1.40	3	0.01	771	3.21	24,039
Somerset	17,861	64.92	7,355	26.73	1,770	6.43	525	1.91	3	0.01	10,506	38.18	27,514
Waldo	12,538	51.57	9,768	40.18	1,604	6.60	394	1.62	9	0.04	2,770	11.39	24,313
Washington	11,196	64.56	5,251	30.28	547	3.15	338	1.95	10	0.06	5,945	34.28	17,342
York	64,092	49.46	57,826	44.63	5,389	4.16	2,255	1.74	16	0.01	6,266	4.84	129,578
Overseas	1,089	19.28	4,068	72.02	363	6.43	113	2.00	15	0.27	-2,979	-52.74	5,648
Totals	417,645	50.98	347,223	42.39	40,579	4.95	13,508	1.65	228	0.03	70,422	8.60	819,183

Counties that flipped from Republican to Democratic

- Cumberland (largest municipality: Portland)
- Knox (largest municipality: Rockland)

==== By congressional district ====
Collins won Maine's second congressional district, which elected Democrat Jared Golden to the House of Representatives.

District	Collins	Gideon	Others	Representative
1st	44%	49%	7%	Chellie Pingree
2nd	59%	35%	6%	Jared Golden

== Analysis ==
According to AP News, "Collins defied prognostications of doom from Washington's consultant class to score perhaps the most unexpected victory of the 2020 cycle, hanging a lopsided loss on a Democratic challenger despite a pile of outside Democratic money and open hostility from the leader of her party, President Donald Trump".

The hotly contested race became the most expensive in Maine history, with Collins spending $23 million and Gideon nearly $48 million. The race also had national implications, as defeating Collins was a key part of the Democrats' strategy to achieve a Senate majority. Collins defeated Gideon despite trailing in nearly every public poll. Like many Republican Senate candidates in 2020, Collins did much better on Election Day than the polls predicted. She positioned herself as an underdog candidate running against an opponent who was not a Maine native and who received extensive support from out-of-staters.

Following her first election to the Senate in 1996, Collins had won her previous re-election campaigns easily. She had received over 68% of the vote in 2014. In this election, Collins outperformed Republican U.S. President Donald Trump, who lost the state to Democratic nominee Joe Biden by more than nine percent. Maine was the only state to elect a senator of a different party than the winner of its presidential contest in the November 3 election.

Gideon underperformed winning Democratic presidential candidate Joe Biden by 10.6%. Her performance was the second-worst underperformance by a Democratic Senate candidate in the country. In the coastal town of Wells, Biden won by 14% and Collins by 6%.

== See also ==
- 2020 Maine elections

== Notes ==
Partisan clients

Voter samples
