= William Hathaway =

American politician (1924–2013)

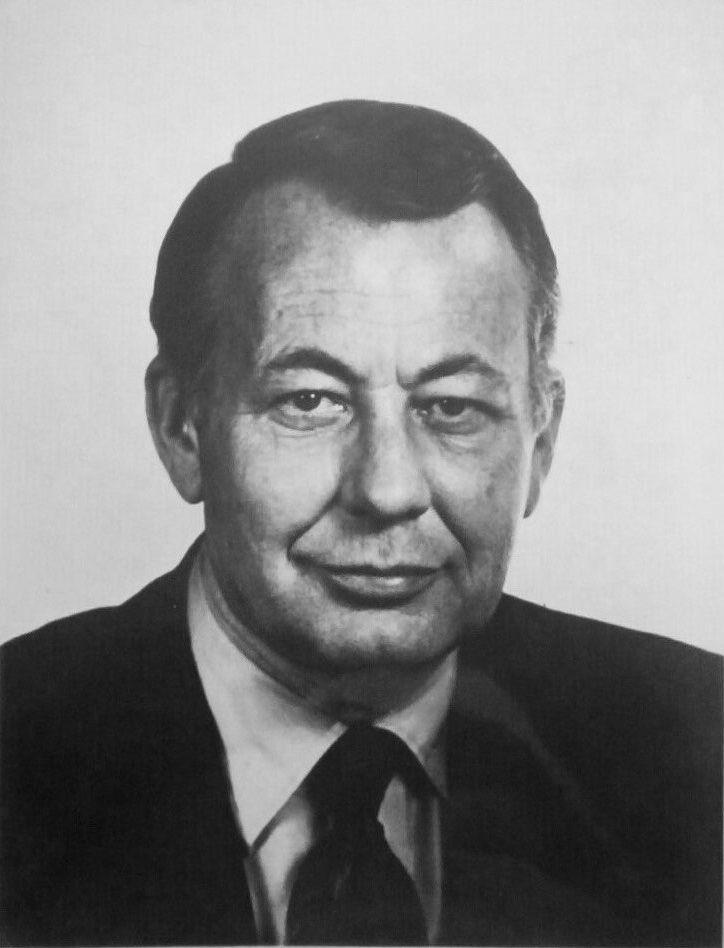

Commissioner of the Federal Maritime Commission
- In office February 8, 1990 – November 11, 1999
- Nominated by: George H. W. Bush (1990); Bill Clinton (1993)
- Preceded by: Thomas F. Moakley
- Succeeded by: Joseph E. Brennan

United States Senator from Maine
- In office January 3, 1973 – January 3, 1979
- Preceded by: Margaret Chase Smith
- Succeeded by: William Cohen

Member of the U.S. House of Representatives from Maine's 2nd district
- In office January 3, 1965 – January 3, 1973
- Preceded by: Clifford McIntire
- Succeeded by: William Cohen

Personal details
- Born: William Dodd Hathaway; February 21, 1924 Cambridge, Massachusetts, U.S.
- Died: June 24, 2013 (aged 89) McLean, Virginia, U.S.
- Party: Democratic
- Education: Harvard University

Military service
- Allegiance: United States
- Branch/service: United States Army Air Corps
- Years of service: 1942–1946
- Battles/wars: World War II; Operation Tidal Wave
- Awards: Purple Heart

William Dodd Hathaway (February 21, 1924 – June 24, 2013) was an American politician and lawyer from Maine. A member of the Democratic Party, he served as a United States senator for Maine from 1973 to 1979, as the U.S. representative for Maine's 2nd congressional district from 1965 to 1973, and as the commissioner of the Federal Maritime Commission from 1990 to 1999.

== Early life ==
Hathaway was born in Cambridge, Massachusetts. He served in World War II in the United States Army Air Corps, where he was shot down while bombing the Ploiești, Romania oil fields during Operation Tidal Wave and was a prisoner of war for over two months. He was awarded the Air Medal, the Purple Heart, and the Distinguished Flying Cross.

After the war he attended Harvard University, graduating in 1949, and Harvard Law School, graduating in 1953. He then moved to Maine and practiced law in Lewiston.

== Political career ==
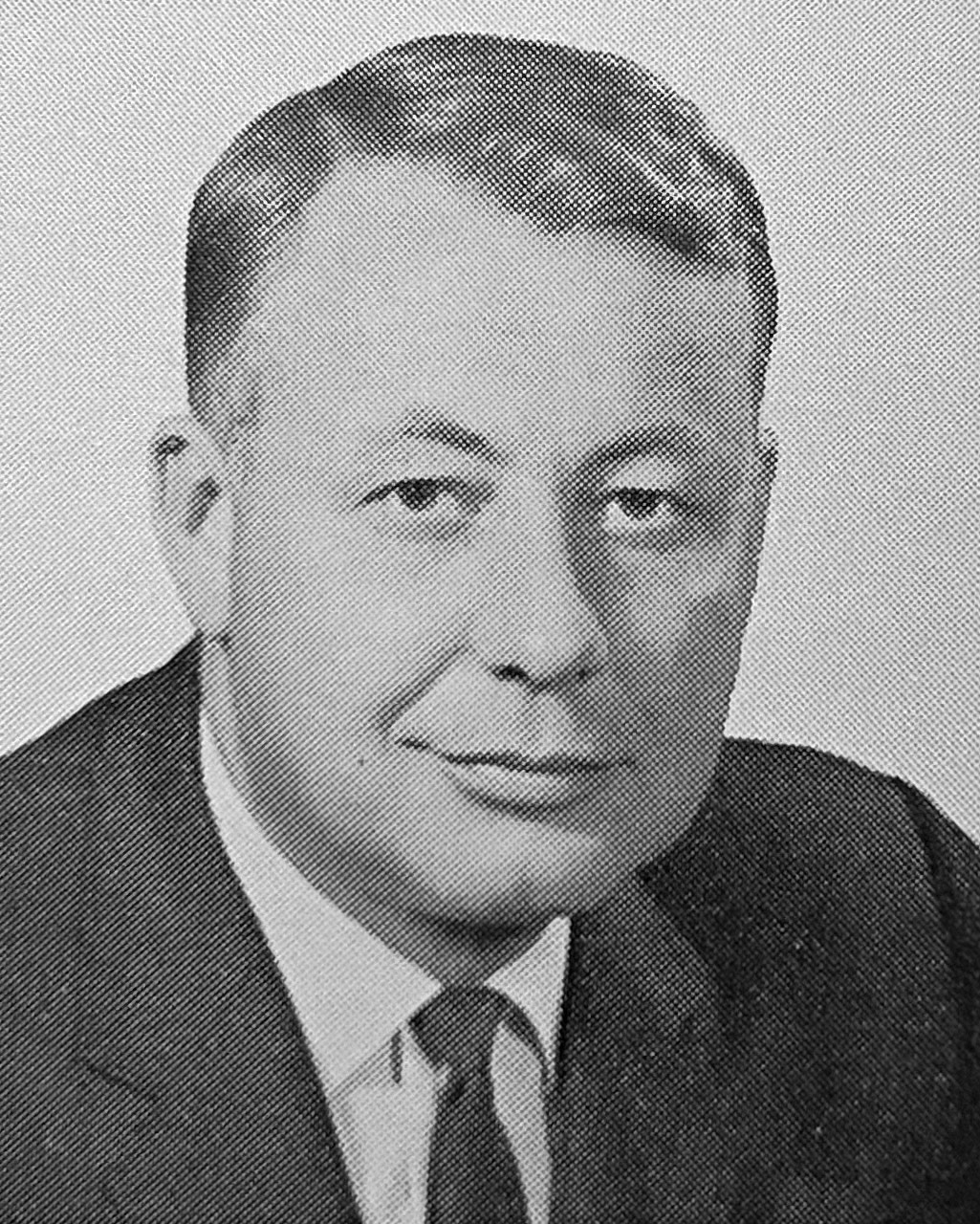
Congressional portrait, c. 1970–71

He served as Assistant County Attorney for Androscoggin County from 1955 to 1957, and he was a Hearing Examiner for the State Liquor Commission from 1957 to 1961.

=== United States Representative ===
A Democrat, in 1964 he was elected to the U.S. House from the 2nd District after incumbent Republican Clifford McIntire ran unsuccessfully for the United States Senate, and he served from 1965 until 1973. This was a time of resurgence for Democrats in Maine, at that time a traditionally Republican state. The same period saw the growth of the political careers of Edmund S. Muskie and Kenneth M. Curtis. As a congressman Hathaway supported President Johnson's Great Society. He also helped lay groundwork to establish the Occupational Safety and Health Administration.

=== United States Senator ===
In 1972, Hathaway ran for the U.S. Senate and defeated four-term Republican incumbent Margaret Chase Smith by 27,230 votes. In 1973, Hathaway was one of the three senators who opposed the nomination of Gerald Ford to be Vice President. (The other two were fellow Democrats Thomas Eagleton of Missouri and Gaylord Nelson of Wisconsin.) One of his Senate aides was future Maine Governor and Senator Angus King. In 1973, Hathaway received a letter from a woman complaining that she had been rejected by the United States Military Academy at West Point, New York because she was female. He then introduced legislation that led to the admission of women at West Point and other military academies in 1976. Hathaway was an unsuccessful candidate for reelection in 1978, losing to his successor in the 2nd District, and future Secretary of Defense William Cohen, by 84,967 votes.

== Later life ==
Hathaway resided in the Washington, D.C., area after leaving the Senate and worked as a lobbyist and lawyer. In 1990 he was appointed by President George H. W. Bush to the Federal Maritime Commission, and he served as chairman from 1993 to 1996.

He retired in 1996 and continued to live in the Washington, DC, area.

In June 2002, at the age of 78, Hathaway was awarded the Distinguished Flying Cross for heroism during Operation Tidal Wave.

Hathaway was married to Mary Lee Bird of Horse Shoe, North Carolina, and Akron, Ohio, for over 61 years until her death, in 2007. Hathaway had two children, Susan and Fred.

Hathaway died of pulmonary fibrosis exactly 69 years to the day after he was shot down during World War II.

== Notes ==
Party political offices
Preceded by Elmer H. Violette	Democratic nominee for U.S. Senator from Maine (Class 2); 1972, 1978	Succeeded by Libby Mitchell
U.S. House of Representatives
Preceded by Clifford McIntire	Member of the U.S. House of Representatives from Maine's 2nd congressional district 1965–1973	Succeeded by William Cohen
U.S. Senate
Preceded by Margaret Smith	United States Senator (Class 2) from Maine; 1973–1979; Served alongside: Edmund Muskie	Succeeded by William Cohen
