= Nell Minow =

American film reviewer and corporate governance expert

- Education: University of Chicago Law School
- Occupations: Film critic; corporate governance scholar
- Years active: 1980s–present
- Spouse: David Apatoff

Nell Minow is an American film critic and corporate governance scholar and expert who writes and speaks frequently on film, media, corporate governance, and investing. Minow was dubbed "the queen of good corporate governance" in BusinessWeek Online in 2003

Minow is the daughter of former Federal Communications Commission chairman Newton Minow and his wife, Josephine Minow. Her sister is Harvard Law School professor Martha Minow.

== Career ==
=== Movie Critic ===
According to Rotten Tomatoes,

Minow writes as the "Movie Mom" about movies, television, the Internet, and parenting; her "Media Mom" column appeared in the Chicago Tribune and her weekly advisory for parents about the new movie releases appears in the Chicago Sun-Times and the Kansas City Star. Minow's articles have appeared in other newspapers and magazines, including USA Today and Slate. Minow reviews movies every week on radio stations across the United States and in Canada.

Her reviews, blog, interviews, commentary, and other features appeared on Beliefnet from 2005-2017 and have also appeared on HuffPost, Rogerebert.com, and thecredits.org. Minow is a member of the Online Film Critics Society, the Broadcast Film Critics Association, the Washington D.C. Area Film Critics Association, and the Association of Women Film Journalists.

=== Corporate Governance Expert ===
Minow received her Juris Doctor degree from the University of Chicago Law School. She wrote the "Risky Business" column for BNET and was a member of the board of GMI Ratings, an independent research company, until August 2014, when it was acquired by MSCI. She is vice chair of ValueEdge Advisors. She has co-written three books in the field with Robert A. G. Monks and is founder and editor of publishing company Miniver Press.

She was principal of LENS, an "investment firm that bought stock in under-performing companies and used shareholder activism to increase their value." In addition, she was dubbed "the CEO Killer" by Fortune magazine for her record of ousting non-performing CEOs at companies like Sears, American Express, Kodak, and Waste Management. Furthermore, she "served as general counsel and then President of Institutional Shareholder Services, Inc., a firm that advises institutional investors on issues of corporate governance, and as an attorney at the Environmental Protection Agency, the Office of Management and Budget, and the United States Department of Justice." Minow frequently comments on the financial markets in the press and on television, including twice annual appearances on the Motley Fool Money podcast and op-eds in The Wall Street Journal, The New York Times, Chicago Tribune, and USA Today, and on network news broadcasts.

She has "written more than 200 articles about corporate governance" and has contributed to a number of business books.

In 2012, John Wiley & Sons, Inc. published Corporate Governance co-edited by Minow and Robert A. G. Monks. Minow was prominently featured in an October 2009 article in "The New Yorker" about CEO compensation. The International Corporate Governance Network (IGCN) gave Minow a Lifetime Achievement Award in 2024.

Since 2024, Minow has remained active in corporate governance and shareholder-rights advocacy through her role as vice chair of ValueEdge Advisors. In this capacity, she has commented publicly on board accountability, executive compensation, and corporate oversight practices, including the dismissal of senior executives and governance issues at major corporations. Her public statements have emphasized board independence, executive performance evaluation, and the alignment of compensation with shareholder interests.

== Commentary ==
Minow has continued to participate in policy discussions concerning corporate regulation and investor rights. In 2025, she provided commentary related to hearings of the United States House Committee on Financial Services addressing proxy advisory firms and shareholder engagement. Her positions have focused on proxy voting, climate-related shareholder proposals, and the role of institutional investors in corporate oversight.

In 2025, she delivered a keynote address at the 30th-anniversary conference of the International Corporate Governance Network, discussing institutional investor responsibilities and long-term corporate governance practices. During the same period, she also appeared on governance-related media programs, including the Shareholder Primacy Podcast, where she discussed developments in shareholder activism, board practices, and regulatory policy in the United States.
