= 2006 United States Senate election in Maine =

- November 7, 2006
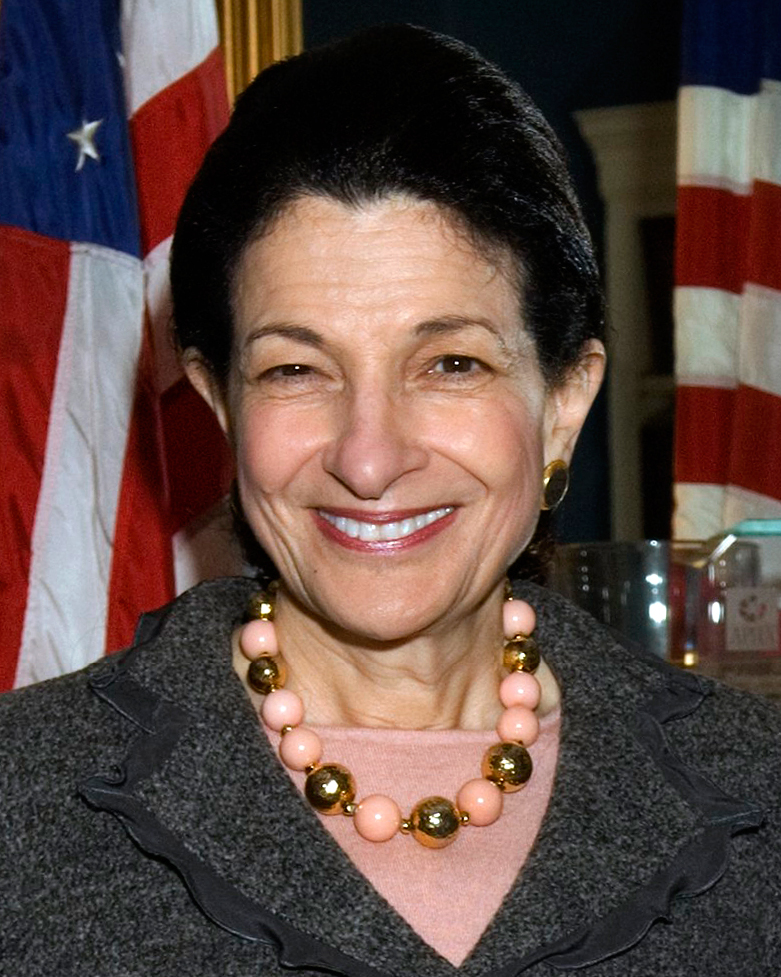

Nominee	Olympia Snowe	Jean Hay Bright	Bill Slavick
Party	Republican	Democratic	Independent
Popular vote	402,598	111,984	29,220
Percentage	74.01%	20.59%	5.37%
- Snowe: 50–60% 60–70% 70–80% 80–90% >90% Bright: 40–50% Slavick: 80–90%
U.S. senator before election
Olympia Snowe
Republican
Elected U.S. Senator
Olympia Snowe
Republican

The 2006 United States Senate election in Maine was held November 7, 2006. Incumbent Republican Olympia Snowe won re-election to a third term, defeating Democrat Jean Hay Bright and independent candidate Bill Slavick. As of 2024, this was the last time Republicans won the Class 1 U.S. Senate seat in Maine.

Along with Pennsylvania and Rhode Island, this was one of the three Republican-held Senate seats up for election in a state that John Kerry won in the 2004 presidential election.

== General election ==
=== Candidates ===
- Jean Hay Bright, activist (Democratic)
- Bill Slavick, activist (Independent)
- Olympia Snowe, incumbent U.S. Senator since 1995 (Republican)

=== Campaign ===
Snowe, who had been elected to both of her previous terms by at least three-to-two margins, had never lost an election. Her success is accredited to her centrist Republican ideology, which resulted in high approval ratings. Meanwhile, her Democratic opponent in the 2006 election, Jean Hay Bright, had never been elected to political office.

Democrats' best hope for taking the seat was that Snowe would retire rather than run in 2006, but there was never any indication that Snowe seriously considered not running for re-election.

The filing deadline for major party candidates was March 15, 2006. The primary was held June 13, 2006. Olympia Snowe was unopposed for the Republican nomination; Jean Hay Bright narrowly won the Democratic nod with 50.7% of the vote against Eric Mehnert.

Hay Bright announced her candidacy in May 2005. Hay Bright was previously an unsuccessful candidate for the Democratic nomination to the House in 1994 and the Senate in 1996.

Despite a nationwide blue wave that saw Democrats gain five seats in the Senate, the race was called by FOX News for the Republican incumbent Olympia Snowe 23 minutes after the polls had closed. Snowe won re-election by a greater margin than any U.S. Senator that cycle except Indiana's Richard Lugar, who faced only a Libertarian opponent.

Hay Bright would only carry the heavily Democratic town of Grand Isle on the Canadian border, while Slavick would win the towns of North Yarmouth, Glenburn, and Kingman with over 80% of the vote according to official tallies.

=== Predictions ===
Source	Ranking	As of
The Cook Political Report	Solid R	November 6, 2006
Sabato's Crystal Ball	Safe R	November 6, 2006
Rothenberg Political Report	Safe R	November 6, 2006
Real Clear Politics	Safe R	November 6, 2006

=== Polling ===
Poll source	Date(s) administered	Sample size (Note: Key: A – all adults RV – registered voters LV – likely voters V – unclear)	Margin of error	Olympia Snowe (R)	Jean Bright (D)	Bill Slavick (I)	Undecided
Critical Insights	October 16–23, 2006	600 (LV)	± 4.0%	74%	14%	6%	6%
Rasmussen Reports	October 17, 2006	500 (LV)	± 4.5%	70%	24%	–	6%
Rasmussen Reports	August 17, 2006	500 (LV)	± 4.5%	68%	20%	–	12%
Rasmussen Reports	July 19, 2006	500 (LV)	± 4.5%	69%	22%	–	9%
Rasmussen Reports	June 15, 2006	500 (LV)	± 4.5%	66%	26%	–	8%

== Results ==

General election results
Party	Candidate	Votes	%	±%
Republican	Olympia Snowe (incumbent)	402,598	74.01%	+5.50
Democratic	Jean Hay Bright	111,984	20.59%	−10.60
Independent	Bill Slavick	29,220	5.37%	N/A
Majority		290,614	53.42	
Turnout		543,802		
Republican hold		Swing		

=== Results by county ===
County	Olympia Snowe Republican		Jean Hay Bright Democratic		William Slavick Other parties		Margin		Total votes cast
County	#	%	#	%	#	%	#	%	Total votes cast
Androscoggin	31,465	77.8%	6,690	16.5%	2,260	5.6%	24,775	61.3%	40,415
Aroostook	19,845	76.4%	5,221	20.1%	908	3.5%	14,624	56.3%	25,974
Cumberland	83,490	69.6%	28,270	23.6%	8,105	6.8%	55,220	46.0%	119,865
Franklin	10,777	76.5%	2,640	18.7%	665	4.7%	8,137	57.8%	14,082
Hancock	16,792	67.7%	6,752	27.3%	1,249	5.0%	10,040	40.4%	24793
Kennebec	39,687	78.0%	8,958	17.6%	2,223	4.4%	30,729	60.4%	50,868
Knox	13,070	71.2%	4,423	24.1%	860	4.7%	8,647	47.1%	18,353
Lincoln	13,274	75.8%	3,427	19.6%	796	4.5%	9,847	56.2%	17,497
Oxford	19,055	79.3%	3,804	15.8%	1,171	4.9%	15,251	63.5%	24,030
Penobscot	42,700	73.7%	11,507	19.9%	3,722	6.4%	31,193	53.4%	57,929
Piscataquis	5,564	75.4%	1,244	16.9%	558	7.7%	4,320	58.5%	7,366
Sagadahoc	12,704	75.6%	3,267	19.4%	825	4.9%	9,437	56.2%	16,796
Somerset	15,053	75.6%	3,934	19.8%	921	4.6%	11,119	55.8%	19,908
Waldo	11,626	69.6%	4,292	25.7%	774	4.7%	7,334	43.9%	16,692
Washington	9,691	74.2%	2,623	20.1%	725	5.7%	7,068	54.1%	13,039
York	57,805	75.8%	14,932	19.6%	3,468	4.6%	42,873	56.2%	76,205
Totals	402,598	74.01%	111,984	20.59%	29,220	5.37%	290,614	53.42%	543,802

== See also ==
- 2006 United States Senate elections
