= List of United States senators from Maine =

Current delegation

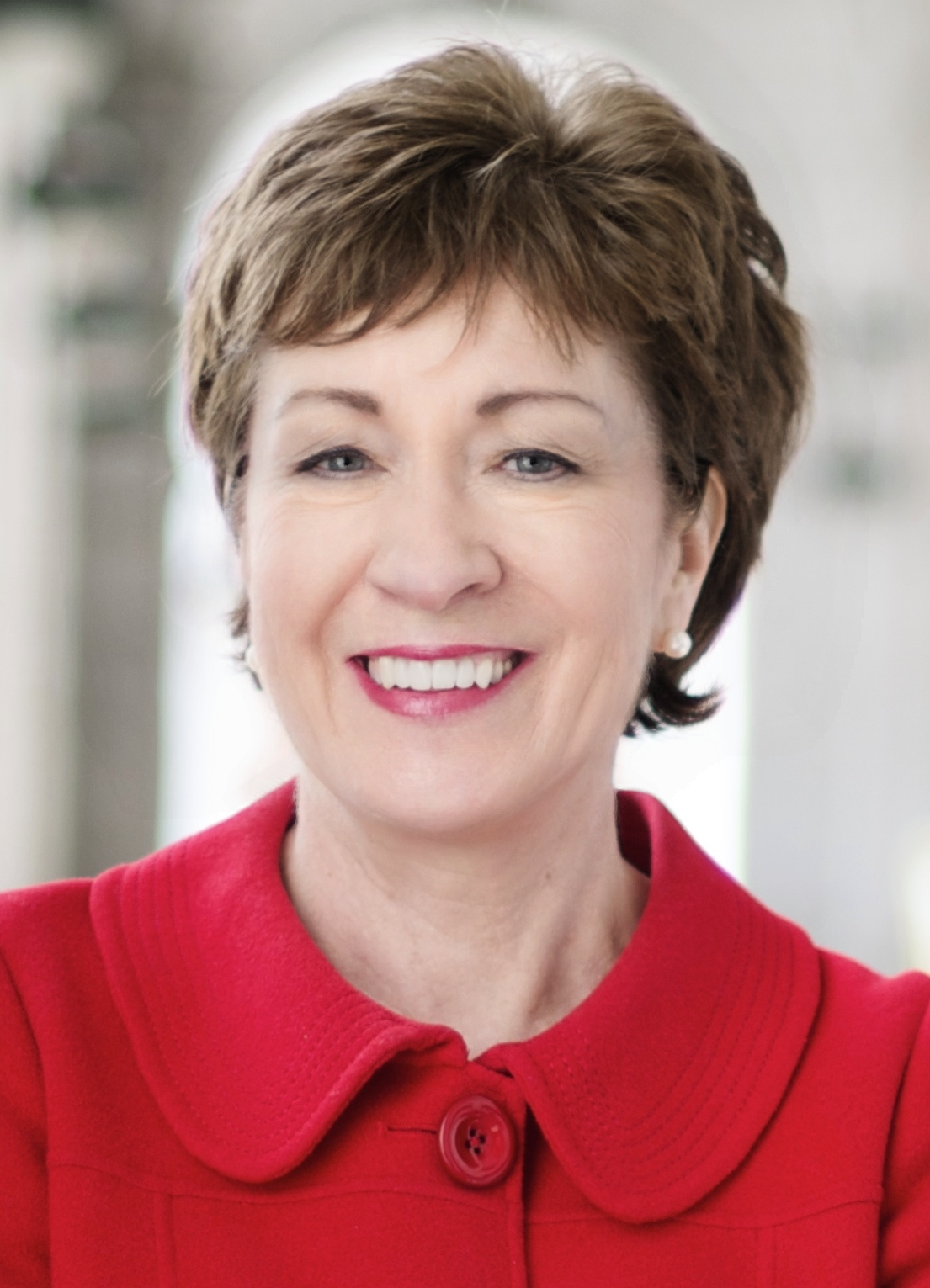
Susan Collins (R)

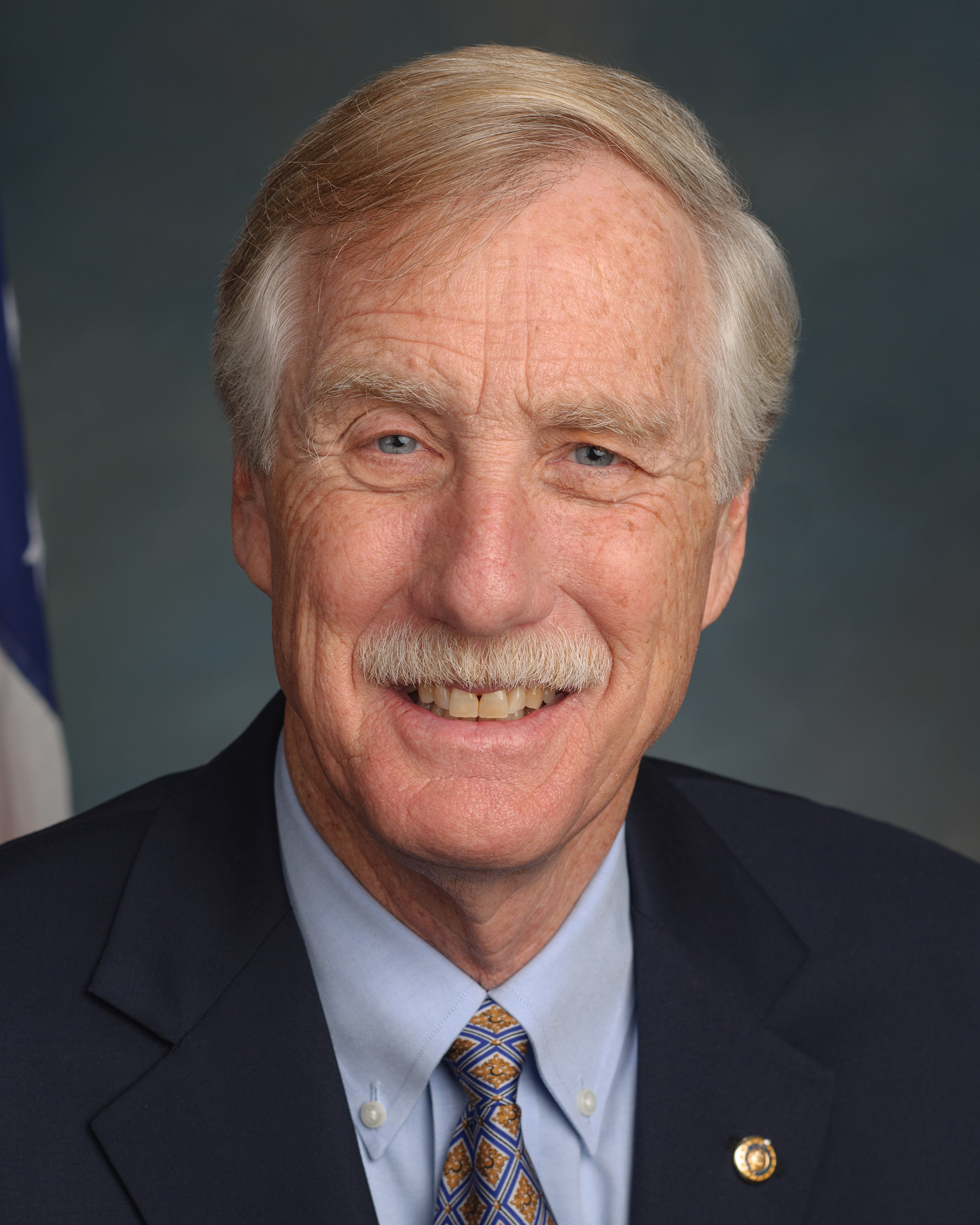
Angus King (I)

(ordered by seniority)

Maine was admitted to the Union on March 15, 1820. The state's U.S. senators belong to class 1 and class 2. Republican Susan Collins (first elected in 1996) and independent Angus King (first elected in 2012) are Maine's current U.S. senators, making Maine one of four states to have a split United States Senate delegation. William P. Frye was Maine's longest serving senator (1881–1911).

== List of senators ==
Class 1 Class 1 senators belong to the electoral cycle that most recently had regular elections in 2006, 2012, 2018, and 2024. The next election will be in 2030.						C	Class 2 Class 2 senators belong to the electoral cycle that most recently had regular elections in 2008, 2014, 2020, and 2026. The next election will be in 2032.					
#	Senator	Party	Dates in office	Electoral history	T	C	T	Electoral history	Dates in office	Party	Senator	#
1	John Holmes (Alfred)	Democratic- Republican	Jun 13, 1820 – Mar 3, 1827	Elected in 1820.	1	16th	1	Elected in 1820.	Jun 14, 1820 – Mar 3, 1829	Democratic- Republican	John Chandler (Monmouth)	1
1	John Holmes (Alfred)	Democratic- Republican	Jun 13, 1820 – Mar 3, 1827	Re-elected in 1821.	2	17th	1	Elected in 1820.	Jun 14, 1820 – Mar 3, 1829	Democratic- Republican	John Chandler (Monmouth)	1
1	John Holmes (Alfred)	Democratic- Republican	Jun 13, 1820 – Mar 3, 1827	Re-elected in 1821.	2	18th	2	Re-elected in 1823. Retired.	Jun 14, 1820 – Mar 3, 1829	Democratic- Republican	John Chandler (Monmouth)	1
1	John Holmes (Alfred)	National; Republican	Jun 13, 1820 – Mar 3, 1827	Re-elected in 1821.	2	19th	2	Re-elected in 1823. Retired.	Jun 14, 1820 – Mar 3, 1829	Jacksonian	John Chandler (Monmouth)	1
2	Albion Parris (Portland)	Jacksonian	Mar 4, 1827 – Aug 26, 1828	Elected in 1827. Resigned to become a judge on the Maine Supreme Judicial Court.	3	20th	2	Re-elected in 1823. Retired.	Jun 14, 1820 – Mar 3, 1829	Jacksonian	John Chandler (Monmouth)	1
Vacant			Aug 26, 1828 – Jan 15, 1829		3	20th	2	Re-elected in 1823. Retired.	Jun 14, 1820 – Mar 3, 1829	Jacksonian	John Chandler (Monmouth)	1
3	John Holmes (Alfred)	National; Republican	Jan 15, 1829 – Mar 3, 1833	Elected to finish Parris's term. Retired.	3	20th	2	Re-elected in 1823. Retired.	Jun 14, 1820 – Mar 3, 1829	Jacksonian	John Chandler (Monmouth)	1
3	John Holmes (Alfred)	National; Republican	Jan 15, 1829 – Mar 3, 1833	Elected to finish Parris's term. Retired.	3	21st	3	Elected in 1829. Resigned.	Mar 4, 1829 – Jan 1, 1835	National; Republican	Peleg Sprague (Hallowell)	2
3	John Holmes (Alfred)	National; Republican	Jan 15, 1829 – Mar 3, 1833	Elected to finish Parris's term. Retired.	3	22nd	3	Elected in 1829. Resigned.	Mar 4, 1829 – Jan 1, 1835	National; Republican	Peleg Sprague (Hallowell)	2
4	Ether Shepley (Saco)	Jacksonian	Mar 4, 1833 – Mar 3, 1836	Elected in 1833. Resigned to become Justice of the Maine Supreme Judicial Court.	4	23rd	3	Elected in 1829. Resigned.	Mar 4, 1829 – Jan 1, 1835	National; Republican	Peleg Sprague (Hallowell)	2
4	Ether Shepley (Saco)	Jacksonian	Mar 4, 1833 – Mar 3, 1836	Elected in 1833. Resigned to become Justice of the Maine Supreme Judicial Court.	4	23rd	3		Jan 1, 1835 – Jan 20, 1835	Vacant		
4	Ether Shepley (Saco)	Jacksonian	Mar 4, 1833 – Mar 3, 1836	Elected in 1833. Resigned to become Justice of the Maine Supreme Judicial Court.	4	23rd	3	Elected to finish Sprague's term, having already been elected to the next term.	Jan 20, 1835 – Mar 3, 1841	Jacksonian	John Ruggles (Thomaston)	3
4	Ether Shepley (Saco)	Jacksonian	Mar 4, 1833 – Mar 3, 1836	Elected in 1833. Resigned to become Justice of the Maine Supreme Judicial Court.	4	24th	4	Elected in 1835. Lost re-election.	Jan 20, 1835 – Mar 3, 1841	Jacksonian	John Ruggles (Thomaston)	3
5	Judah Dana (Fryeburg)	Jacksonian	Mar 4, 1836 – Mar 3, 1837	Appointed to continue Shepley's term. Either lost election to finish the term or retired when elected successor qualified.	4	24th	4	Elected in 1835. Lost re-election.	Jan 20, 1835 – Mar 3, 1841	Jacksonian	John Ruggles (Thomaston)	3
6	Reuel Williams (Augusta)	Democratic	Mar 4, 1837 – Feb 15, 1843	Elected to finish Shepley's term.	4	25th	4	Elected in 1835. Lost re-election.	Jan 20, 1835 – Mar 3, 1841	Democratic	John Ruggles (Thomaston)	3
6	Reuel Williams (Augusta)	Democratic	Mar 4, 1837 – Feb 15, 1843	Re-elected in 1839. Resigned.	5	26th	4	Elected in 1835. Lost re-election.	Jan 20, 1835 – Mar 3, 1841	Democratic	John Ruggles (Thomaston)	3
6	Reuel Williams (Augusta)	Democratic	Mar 4, 1837 – Feb 15, 1843	Re-elected in 1839. Resigned.	5	27th	5	Elected in 1840. Lost re-election.	Mar 4, 1841 – Mar 3, 1847	Whig	George Evans (Gardiner)	4
Vacant			Feb 15, 1843 – Dec 4, 1843		5	27th	5	Elected in 1840. Lost re-election.	Mar 4, 1841 – Mar 3, 1847	Whig	George Evans (Gardiner)	4
Vacant			Feb 15, 1843 – Dec 4, 1843		5	28th	5	Elected in 1840. Lost re-election.	Mar 4, 1841 – Mar 3, 1847	Whig	George Evans (Gardiner)	4
7	John Fairfield (Saco)	Democratic	Dec 4, 1843 – Dec 24, 1847	Elected to finish Williams's term.	5	28th	5	Elected in 1840. Lost re-election.	Mar 4, 1841 – Mar 3, 1847	Whig	George Evans (Gardiner)	4
7	John Fairfield (Saco)	Democratic	Dec 4, 1843 – Dec 24, 1847	Re-elected in 1844 or 1845. Died.	6	29th	5	Elected in 1840. Lost re-election.	Mar 4, 1841 – Mar 3, 1847	Whig	George Evans (Gardiner)	4
7	John Fairfield (Saco)	Democratic	Dec 4, 1843 – Dec 24, 1847	Re-elected in 1844 or 1845. Died.	6	30th	6	Elected in 1846. Retired.	Mar 4, 1847 – Mar 3, 1853	Democratic	James W. Bradbury (Augusta)	5
Vacant			Dec 24, 1847 – Jan 5, 1848		6	30th	6	Elected in 1846. Retired.	Mar 4, 1847 – Mar 3, 1853	Democratic	James W. Bradbury (Augusta)	5
8	Wyman B. S. Moor (Bangor)	Democratic	Jan 5, 1848 – June 7, 1848	Appointed to continue term. Successor elected.	6	30th	6	Elected in 1846. Retired.	Mar 4, 1847 – Mar 3, 1853	Democratic	James W. Bradbury (Augusta)	5
9	Hannibal Hamlin (Hampden)	Democratic	Jun 8, 1848 – Jan 7, 1857	Elected in 1848 to finish term.	6	30th	6	Elected in 1846. Retired.	Mar 4, 1847 – Mar 3, 1853	Democratic	James W. Bradbury (Augusta)	5
9	Hannibal Hamlin (Hampden)	Democratic	Jun 8, 1848 – Jan 7, 1857	Elected in 1848 to finish term.	6	31st	6	Elected in 1846. Retired.	Mar 4, 1847 – Mar 3, 1853	Democratic	James W. Bradbury (Augusta)	5
9	Hannibal Hamlin (Hampden)	Democratic	Jun 8, 1848 – Jan 7, 1857	Re-elected in 1851. Changed parties in 1856. Resigned to become Governor of Maine.	7	32nd	6	Elected in 1846. Retired.	Mar 4, 1847 – Mar 3, 1853	Democratic	James W. Bradbury (Augusta)	5
9	Hannibal Hamlin (Hampden)	Democratic	Jun 8, 1848 – Jan 7, 1857	Re-elected in 1851. Changed parties in 1856. Resigned to become Governor of Maine.	7	33rd	7	Legislature failed to elect.	Mar 4, 1853 – Feb 10, 1854	Vacant		
9	Hannibal Hamlin (Hampden)	Democratic	Jun 8, 1848 – Jan 7, 1857	Re-elected in 1851. Changed parties in 1856. Resigned to become Governor of Maine.	7	33rd	7	Elected to finish term.	Feb 10, 1854 – Jul 1, 1864	Whig	William P. Fessenden (Portland)	6
9	Hannibal Hamlin (Hampden)	Democratic	Jun 8, 1848 – Jan 7, 1857	Re-elected in 1851. Changed parties in 1856. Resigned to become Governor of Maine.	7	34th	7	Elected to finish term.	Feb 10, 1854 – Jul 1, 1864	Whig	William P. Fessenden (Portland)	6
9	Hannibal Hamlin (Hampden)	Republican	Jun 8, 1848 – Jan 7, 1857	Re-elected in 1851. Changed parties in 1856. Resigned to become Governor of Maine.	7	34th	7	Elected to finish term.	Feb 10, 1854 – Jul 1, 1864	Whig	William P. Fessenden (Portland)	6
Vacant			Jan 7, 1857 – Jan 16, 1857		7	34th	7	Elected to finish term.	Feb 10, 1854 – Jul 1, 1864	Whig	William P. Fessenden (Portland)	6
10	Amos Nourse (Bath)	Republican	Jan 16, 1857 – Mar 3, 1857	Elected in 1857 to finish term. Retired.	7	34th	7	Elected to finish term.	Feb 10, 1854 – Jul 1, 1864	Whig	William P. Fessenden (Portland)	6
11	Hannibal Hamlin (Hampden)	Republican	Mar 4, 1857 – Jan 17, 1861	Elected in 1857. Resigned to become Vice President of the United States.	8	35th	7	Elected to finish term.	Feb 10, 1854 – Jul 1, 1864	Republican	William P. Fessenden (Portland)	6
11	Hannibal Hamlin (Hampden)	Republican	Mar 4, 1857 – Jan 17, 1861	Elected in 1857. Resigned to become Vice President of the United States.	8	36th	8	Re-elected in 1859. Resigned to become U.S. Secretary of the Treasury.	Feb 10, 1854 – Jul 1, 1864	Republican	William P. Fessenden (Portland)	6
12	Lot M. Morrill (Augusta)	Republican	Jan 17, 1861 – Mar 3, 1869	Elected in 1861 to finish term.	8	36th	8	Re-elected in 1859. Resigned to become U.S. Secretary of the Treasury.	Feb 10, 1854 – Jul 1, 1864	Republican	William P. Fessenden (Portland)	6
12	Lot M. Morrill (Augusta)	Republican	Jan 17, 1861 – Mar 3, 1869	Elected in 1861 to finish term.	8	37th	8	Re-elected in 1859. Resigned to become U.S. Secretary of the Treasury.	Feb 10, 1854 – Jul 1, 1864	Republican	William P. Fessenden (Portland)	6
12	Lot M. Morrill (Augusta)	Republican	Jan 17, 1861 – Mar 3, 1869	Re-elected in 1863. Lost re-election.	9	38th	8	Re-elected in 1859. Resigned to become U.S. Secretary of the Treasury.	Feb 10, 1854 – Jul 1, 1864	Republican	William P. Fessenden (Portland)	6
12	Lot M. Morrill (Augusta)	Republican	Jan 17, 1861 – Mar 3, 1869	Re-elected in 1863. Lost re-election.	9	38th	8		Jul 1, 1864 – Oct 27, 1864	Vacant		
12	Lot M. Morrill (Augusta)	Republican	Jan 17, 1861 – Mar 3, 1869	Re-elected in 1863. Lost re-election.	9	38th	8	Appointed to continue Fessenden's term. Elected in 1865 to finish Fessenden's term. Retired.	Oct 27, 1864 – Mar 3, 1865	Republican	Nathan A. Farwell (Rockland)	7
12	Lot M. Morrill (Augusta)	Republican	Jan 17, 1861 – Mar 3, 1869	Re-elected in 1863. Lost re-election.	9	39th	9	Elected in 1864 or 1865. Died.	Mar 4, 1865 – Sep 8, 1869	Republican	William P. Fessenden (Portland)	8
12	Lot M. Morrill (Augusta)	Republican	Jan 17, 1861 – Mar 3, 1869	Re-elected in 1863. Lost re-election.	9	40th	9	Elected in 1864 or 1865. Died.	Mar 4, 1865 – Sep 8, 1869	Republican	William P. Fessenden (Portland)	8
13	Hannibal Hamlin (Bangor)	Republican	Mar 4, 1869 – Mar 3, 1881	Elected in 1869.	10	41st	9	Elected in 1864 or 1865. Died.	Mar 4, 1865 – Sep 8, 1869	Republican	William P. Fessenden (Portland)	8
13	Hannibal Hamlin (Bangor)	Republican	Mar 4, 1869 – Mar 3, 1881	Elected in 1869.	10	41st	9		Sep 8, 1869 – Oct 30, 1869	Vacant		
13	Hannibal Hamlin (Bangor)	Republican	Mar 4, 1869 – Mar 3, 1881	Elected in 1869.	10	41st	9	Appointed to finish Fessenden's term. Elected in 1870 to finish Fessenden's term.	Oct 30, 1869 – Jul 7, 1876	Republican	Lot M. Morrill (Augusta)	9
13	Hannibal Hamlin (Bangor)	Republican	Mar 4, 1869 – Mar 3, 1881	Elected in 1869.	10	42nd	10	Re-election year unknown. Resigned to become U.S. Secretary of the Treasury.	Oct 30, 1869 – Jul 7, 1876	Republican	Lot M. Morrill (Augusta)	9
13	Hannibal Hamlin (Bangor)	Republican	Mar 4, 1869 – Mar 3, 1881	Elected in 1869.	10	43rd	10	Re-election year unknown. Resigned to become U.S. Secretary of the Treasury.	Oct 30, 1869 – Jul 7, 1876	Republican	Lot M. Morrill (Augusta)	9
13	Hannibal Hamlin (Bangor)	Republican	Mar 4, 1869 – Mar 3, 1881	Re-elected in 1875. Retired.	11	44th	10	Re-election year unknown. Resigned to become U.S. Secretary of the Treasury.	Oct 30, 1869 – Jul 7, 1876	Republican	Lot M. Morrill (Augusta)	9
13	Hannibal Hamlin (Bangor)	Republican	Mar 4, 1869 – Mar 3, 1881	Re-elected in 1875. Retired.	11	44th	10		Jul 7, 1876 – Jul 10, 1876	Vacant		
13	Hannibal Hamlin (Bangor)	Republican	Mar 4, 1869 – Mar 3, 1881	Re-elected in 1875. Retired.	11	44th	10	Appointed to finish Morrill's term. Elected in 1877 to finish Morrill's term.	Jul 10, 1876 – Mar 5, 1881	Republican	James G. Blaine (Augusta)	10
13	Hannibal Hamlin (Bangor)	Republican	Mar 4, 1869 – Mar 3, 1881	Re-elected in 1875. Retired.	11	45th	11	Elected to full term in 1877. Resigned to become U.S. Secretary of State.	Jul 10, 1876 – Mar 5, 1881	Republican	James G. Blaine (Augusta)	10
13	Hannibal Hamlin (Bangor)	Republican	Mar 4, 1869 – Mar 3, 1881	Re-elected in 1875. Retired.	11	46th	11	Elected to full term in 1877. Resigned to become U.S. Secretary of State.	Jul 10, 1876 – Mar 5, 1881	Republican	James G. Blaine (Augusta)	10
14	Eugene Hale (Ellsworth)	Republican	Mar 4, 1881 – Mar 3, 1911	Elected in 1881.	12	47th	11	Elected to full term in 1877. Resigned to become U.S. Secretary of State.	Jul 10, 1876 – Mar 5, 1881	Republican	James G. Blaine (Augusta)	10
14	Eugene Hale (Ellsworth)	Republican	Mar 4, 1881 – Mar 3, 1911	Elected in 1881.	12	47th	11		Mar 5, 1881 – Mar 18, 1881	Vacant		
14	Eugene Hale (Ellsworth)	Republican	Mar 4, 1881 – Mar 3, 1911	Elected in 1881.	12	47th	11	Elected to finish Blaine's term	Mar 18, 1881 – Aug 8, 1911	Republican	William P. Frye (Lewiston)	11
14	Eugene Hale (Ellsworth)	Republican	Mar 4, 1881 – Mar 3, 1911	Elected in 1881.	12	48th	12	Re-elected in 1883.	Mar 18, 1881 – Aug 8, 1911	Republican	William P. Frye (Lewiston)	11
14	Eugene Hale (Ellsworth)	Republican	Mar 4, 1881 – Mar 3, 1911	Elected in 1881.	12	49th	12	Re-elected in 1883.	Mar 18, 1881 – Aug 8, 1911	Republican	William P. Frye (Lewiston)	11
14	Eugene Hale (Ellsworth)	Republican	Mar 4, 1881 – Mar 3, 1911	Re-elected in 1887.	13	50th	12	Re-elected in 1883.	Mar 18, 1881 – Aug 8, 1911	Republican	William P. Frye (Lewiston)	11
14	Eugene Hale (Ellsworth)	Republican	Mar 4, 1881 – Mar 3, 1911	Re-elected in 1887.	13	51st	13	Re-elected in 1889.	Mar 18, 1881 – Aug 8, 1911	Republican	William P. Frye (Lewiston)	11
14	Eugene Hale (Ellsworth)	Republican	Mar 4, 1881 – Mar 3, 1911	Re-elected in 1887.	13	52nd	13	Re-elected in 1889.	Mar 18, 1881 – Aug 8, 1911	Republican	William P. Frye (Lewiston)	11
14	Eugene Hale (Ellsworth)	Republican	Mar 4, 1881 – Mar 3, 1911	Re-elected in 1893.	14	53rd	13	Re-elected in 1889.	Mar 18, 1881 – Aug 8, 1911	Republican	William P. Frye (Lewiston)	11
14	Eugene Hale (Ellsworth)	Republican	Mar 4, 1881 – Mar 3, 1911	Re-elected in 1893.	14	54th	14	Re-elected in 1895.	Mar 18, 1881 – Aug 8, 1911	Republican	William P. Frye (Lewiston)	11
14	Eugene Hale (Ellsworth)	Republican	Mar 4, 1881 – Mar 3, 1911	Re-elected in 1893.	14	55th	14	Re-elected in 1895.	Mar 18, 1881 – Aug 8, 1911	Republican	William P. Frye (Lewiston)	11
14	Eugene Hale (Ellsworth)	Republican	Mar 4, 1881 – Mar 3, 1911	Re-elected in 1899.	15	56th	14	Re-elected in 1895.	Mar 18, 1881 – Aug 8, 1911	Republican	William P. Frye (Lewiston)	11
14	Eugene Hale (Ellsworth)	Republican	Mar 4, 1881 – Mar 3, 1911	Re-elected in 1899.	15	57th	15	Re-elected in 1901.	Mar 18, 1881 – Aug 8, 1911	Republican	William P. Frye (Lewiston)	11
14	Eugene Hale (Ellsworth)	Republican	Mar 4, 1881 – Mar 3, 1911	Re-elected in 1899.	15	58th	15	Re-elected in 1901.	Mar 18, 1881 – Aug 8, 1911	Republican	William P. Frye (Lewiston)	11
14	Eugene Hale (Ellsworth)	Republican	Mar 4, 1881 – Mar 3, 1911	Re-elected in 1905. Retired.	16	59th	15	Re-elected in 1901.	Mar 18, 1881 – Aug 8, 1911	Republican	William P. Frye (Lewiston)	11
14	Eugene Hale (Ellsworth)	Republican	Mar 4, 1881 – Mar 3, 1911	Re-elected in 1905. Retired.	16	60th	16	Re-elected in 1907. Died.	Mar 18, 1881 – Aug 8, 1911	Republican	William P. Frye (Lewiston)	11
14	Eugene Hale (Ellsworth)	Republican	Mar 4, 1881 – Mar 3, 1911	Re-elected in 1905. Retired.	16	61st	16	Re-elected in 1907. Died.	Mar 18, 1881 – Aug 8, 1911	Republican	William P. Frye (Lewiston)	11
15	Charles F. Johnson (Waterville)	Democratic	Mar 4, 1911 – Mar 3, 1917	Elected in 1911. Lost re-election.	17	62nd	16	Re-elected in 1907. Died.	Mar 18, 1881 – Aug 8, 1911	Republican	William P. Frye (Lewiston)	11
15	Charles F. Johnson (Waterville)	Democratic	Mar 4, 1911 – Mar 3, 1917	Elected in 1911. Lost re-election.	17	62nd	16		Aug 8, 1911 – Sep 23, 1911	Vacant		
15	Charles F. Johnson (Waterville)	Democratic	Mar 4, 1911 – Mar 3, 1917	Elected in 1911. Lost re-election.	17	62nd	16	Appointed to continue Frye's term. Elected in 1912 to finish Frye's term. Lost re-election.	Sep 23, 1911 – Mar 3, 1913	Democratic	Obadiah Gardner (Rockland)	12
15	Charles F. Johnson (Waterville)	Democratic	Mar 4, 1911 – Mar 3, 1917	Elected in 1911. Lost re-election.	17	63rd	17	Elected in 1913. Died.	Mar 4, 1913 – Jun 16, 1916	Republican	Edwin C. Burleigh (Augusta)	13
15	Charles F. Johnson (Waterville)	Democratic	Mar 4, 1911 – Mar 3, 1917	Elected in 1911. Lost re-election.	17	64th	17	Elected in 1913. Died.	Mar 4, 1913 – Jun 16, 1916	Republican	Edwin C. Burleigh (Augusta)	13
15	Charles F. Johnson (Waterville)	Democratic	Mar 4, 1911 – Mar 3, 1917	Elected in 1911. Lost re-election.	17	64th	17		Jun 16, 1916 – Sep 12, 1916	Vacant		
15	Charles F. Johnson (Waterville)	Democratic	Mar 4, 1911 – Mar 3, 1917	Elected in 1911. Lost re-election.	17	64th	17	Elected to finish Burleigh's term.	Sep 12, 1916 – Aug 23, 1926	Republican	Bert M. Fernald (West Poland)	14
16	Frederick Hale (Portland)	Republican	Mar 4, 1917 – Jan 3, 1941	Elected in 1916.	18	65th	17	Elected to finish Burleigh's term.	Sep 12, 1916 – Aug 23, 1926	Republican	Bert M. Fernald (West Poland)	14
16	Frederick Hale (Portland)	Republican	Mar 4, 1917 – Jan 3, 1941	Elected in 1916.	18	66th	18	Re-elected in 1918.	Sep 12, 1916 – Aug 23, 1926	Republican	Bert M. Fernald (West Poland)	14
16	Frederick Hale (Portland)	Republican	Mar 4, 1917 – Jan 3, 1941	Elected in 1916.	18	67th	18	Re-elected in 1918.	Sep 12, 1916 – Aug 23, 1926	Republican	Bert M. Fernald (West Poland)	14
16	Frederick Hale (Portland)	Republican	Mar 4, 1917 – Jan 3, 1941	Re-elected in 1922.	19	68th	18	Re-elected in 1918.	Sep 12, 1916 – Aug 23, 1926	Republican	Bert M. Fernald (West Poland)	14
16	Frederick Hale (Portland)	Republican	Mar 4, 1917 – Jan 3, 1941	Re-elected in 1922.	19	69th	19	Re-elected in 1924. Died.	Sep 12, 1916 – Aug 23, 1926	Republican	Bert M. Fernald (West Poland)	14
16	Frederick Hale (Portland)	Republican	Mar 4, 1917 – Jan 3, 1941	Re-elected in 1922.	19	69th	19		Aug 23, 1926 – Nov 30, 1926	Vacant		
16	Frederick Hale (Portland)	Republican	Mar 4, 1917 – Jan 3, 1941	Re-elected in 1922.	19	69th	19	Elected to finish Fernald's term. Retired.	Nov 30, 1926 – Mar 3, 1931	Republican	Arthur R. Gould (Presque Isle)	15
16	Frederick Hale (Portland)	Republican	Mar 4, 1917 – Jan 3, 1941	Re-elected in 1922.	19	70th	19	Elected to finish Fernald's term. Retired.	Nov 30, 1926 – Mar 3, 1931	Republican	Arthur R. Gould (Presque Isle)	15
16	Frederick Hale (Portland)	Republican	Mar 4, 1917 – Jan 3, 1941	Re-elected in 1928.	20	71st	19	Elected to finish Fernald's term. Retired.	Nov 30, 1926 – Mar 3, 1931	Republican	Arthur R. Gould (Presque Isle)	15
16	Frederick Hale (Portland)	Republican	Mar 4, 1917 – Jan 3, 1941	Re-elected in 1928.	20	72nd	20	Elected in 1930.	Mar 4, 1931 – Jan 3, 1949	Republican	Wallace H. White (Auburn)	16
16	Frederick Hale (Portland)	Republican	Mar 4, 1917 – Jan 3, 1941	Re-elected in 1928.	20	73rd	20	Elected in 1930.	Mar 4, 1931 – Jan 3, 1949	Republican	Wallace H. White (Auburn)	16
16	Frederick Hale (Portland)	Republican	Mar 4, 1917 – Jan 3, 1941	Re-elected in 1934. Retired.	21	74th	20	Elected in 1930.	Mar 4, 1931 – Jan 3, 1949	Republican	Wallace H. White (Auburn)	16
16	Frederick Hale (Portland)	Republican	Mar 4, 1917 – Jan 3, 1941	Re-elected in 1934. Retired.	21	75th	21	Re-elected in 1936.	Mar 4, 1931 – Jan 3, 1949	Republican	Wallace H. White (Auburn)	16
16	Frederick Hale (Portland)	Republican	Mar 4, 1917 – Jan 3, 1941	Re-elected in 1934. Retired.	21	76th	21	Re-elected in 1936.	Mar 4, 1931 – Jan 3, 1949	Republican	Wallace H. White (Auburn)	16
17	Owen Brewster (Dexter)	Republican	Jan 3, 1941 – Dec 31, 1952	Elected in 1940.	22	77th	21	Re-elected in 1936.	Mar 4, 1931 – Jan 3, 1949	Republican	Wallace H. White (Auburn)	16
17	Owen Brewster (Dexter)	Republican	Jan 3, 1941 – Dec 31, 1952	Elected in 1940.	22	78th	22	Re-elected in 1942. Retired.	Mar 4, 1931 – Jan 3, 1949	Republican	Wallace H. White (Auburn)	16
17	Owen Brewster (Dexter)	Republican	Jan 3, 1941 – Dec 31, 1952	Elected in 1940.	22	79th	22	Re-elected in 1942. Retired.	Mar 4, 1931 – Jan 3, 1949	Republican	Wallace H. White (Auburn)	16
17	Owen Brewster (Dexter)	Republican	Jan 3, 1941 – Dec 31, 1952	Re-elected in 1946. Resigned, having already lost renomination.	23	80th	22	Re-elected in 1942. Retired.	Mar 4, 1931 – Jan 3, 1949	Republican	Wallace H. White (Auburn)	16
17	Owen Brewster (Dexter)	Republican	Jan 3, 1941 – Dec 31, 1952	Re-elected in 1946. Resigned, having already lost renomination.	23	81st	23	Elected in 1948.	Jan 3, 1949 – Jan 3, 1973	Republican	Margaret Chase Smith (Skowhegan)	17
17	Owen Brewster (Dexter)	Republican	Jan 3, 1941 – Dec 31, 1952	Re-elected in 1946. Resigned, having already lost renomination.	23	82nd	23	Elected in 1948.	Jan 3, 1949 – Jan 3, 1973	Republican	Margaret Chase Smith (Skowhegan)	17
Vacant			Dec 31, 1952 – Jan 3, 1953		23	82nd	23	Elected in 1948.	Jan 3, 1949 – Jan 3, 1973	Republican	Margaret Chase Smith (Skowhegan)	17
18	Frederick G. Payne (Waldoboro)	Republican	Jan 3, 1953 – Jan 3, 1959	Elected in 1952. Lost re-election.	24	83rd	23	Elected in 1948.	Jan 3, 1949 – Jan 3, 1973	Republican	Margaret Chase Smith (Skowhegan)	17
18	Frederick G. Payne (Waldoboro)	Republican	Jan 3, 1953 – Jan 3, 1959	Elected in 1952. Lost re-election.	24	84th	24	Re-elected in 1954.	Jan 3, 1949 – Jan 3, 1973	Republican	Margaret Chase Smith (Skowhegan)	17
18	Frederick G. Payne (Waldoboro)	Republican	Jan 3, 1953 – Jan 3, 1959	Elected in 1952. Lost re-election.	24	85th	24	Re-elected in 1954.	Jan 3, 1949 – Jan 3, 1973	Republican	Margaret Chase Smith (Skowhegan)	17
19	Edmund Muskie (Waterville)	Democratic	Jan 3, 1959 – May 7, 1980	Elected in 1958.	25	86th	24	Re-elected in 1954.	Jan 3, 1949 – Jan 3, 1973	Republican	Margaret Chase Smith (Skowhegan)	17
19	Edmund Muskie (Waterville)	Democratic	Jan 3, 1959 – May 7, 1980	Elected in 1958.	25	87th	25	Re-elected in 1960.	Jan 3, 1949 – Jan 3, 1973	Republican	Margaret Chase Smith (Skowhegan)	17
19	Edmund Muskie (Waterville)	Democratic	Jan 3, 1959 – May 7, 1980	Elected in 1958.	25	88th	25	Re-elected in 1960.	Jan 3, 1949 – Jan 3, 1973	Republican	Margaret Chase Smith (Skowhegan)	17
19	Edmund Muskie (Waterville)	Democratic	Jan 3, 1959 – May 7, 1980	Re-elected in 1964.	26	89th	25	Re-elected in 1960.	Jan 3, 1949 – Jan 3, 1973	Republican	Margaret Chase Smith (Skowhegan)	17
19	Edmund Muskie (Waterville)	Democratic	Jan 3, 1959 – May 7, 1980	Re-elected in 1964.	26	90th	26	Re-elected in 1966. Lost re-election.	Jan 3, 1949 – Jan 3, 1973	Republican	Margaret Chase Smith (Skowhegan)	17
19	Edmund Muskie (Waterville)	Democratic	Jan 3, 1959 – May 7, 1980	Re-elected in 1964.	26	91st	26	Re-elected in 1966. Lost re-election.	Jan 3, 1949 – Jan 3, 1973	Republican	Margaret Chase Smith (Skowhegan)	17
19	Edmund Muskie (Waterville)	Democratic	Jan 3, 1959 – May 7, 1980	Re-elected in 1970.	27	92nd	26	Re-elected in 1966. Lost re-election.	Jan 3, 1949 – Jan 3, 1973	Republican	Margaret Chase Smith (Skowhegan)	17
19	Edmund Muskie (Waterville)	Democratic	Jan 3, 1959 – May 7, 1980	Re-elected in 1970.	27	93rd	27	Elected in 1972. Lost re-election.	Jan 3, 1973 – Jan 3, 1979	Democratic	Bill Hathaway (Auburn)	18
19	Edmund Muskie (Waterville)	Democratic	Jan 3, 1959 – May 7, 1980	Re-elected in 1970.	27	94th	27	Elected in 1972. Lost re-election.	Jan 3, 1973 – Jan 3, 1979	Democratic	Bill Hathaway (Auburn)	18
19	Edmund Muskie (Waterville)	Democratic	Jan 3, 1959 – May 7, 1980	Re-elected in 1976. Resigned to become U.S. Secretary of State.	28	95th	27	Elected in 1972. Lost re-election.	Jan 3, 1973 – Jan 3, 1979	Democratic	Bill Hathaway (Auburn)	18
19	Edmund Muskie (Waterville)	Democratic	Jan 3, 1959 – May 7, 1980	Re-elected in 1976. Resigned to become U.S. Secretary of State.	28	96th	28	Elected in 1978.	Jan 3, 1979 – Jan 3, 1997	Republican	William Cohen (Bangor)	19
Vacant			May 7, 1980 – May 19, 1980		28	96th	28	Elected in 1978.	Jan 3, 1979 – Jan 3, 1997	Republican	William Cohen (Bangor)	19
20	George J. Mitchell (South Portland)	Democratic	May 19, 1980 – Jan 3, 1995	Appointed to finish Muskie's term.	28	96th	28	Elected in 1978.	Jan 3, 1979 – Jan 3, 1997	Republican	William Cohen (Bangor)	19
20	George J. Mitchell (South Portland)	Democratic	May 19, 1980 – Jan 3, 1995	Appointed to finish Muskie's term.	28	97th	28	Elected in 1978.	Jan 3, 1979 – Jan 3, 1997	Republican	William Cohen (Bangor)	19
20	George J. Mitchell (South Portland)	Democratic	May 19, 1980 – Jan 3, 1995	Elected in 1982.	29	98th	28	Elected in 1978.	Jan 3, 1979 – Jan 3, 1997	Republican	William Cohen (Bangor)	19
20	George J. Mitchell (South Portland)	Democratic	May 19, 1980 – Jan 3, 1995	Elected in 1982.	29	99th	29	Re-elected in 1984.	Jan 3, 1979 – Jan 3, 1997	Republican	William Cohen (Bangor)	19
20	George J. Mitchell (South Portland)	Democratic	May 19, 1980 – Jan 3, 1995	Elected in 1982.	29	100th	29	Re-elected in 1984.	Jan 3, 1979 – Jan 3, 1997	Republican	William Cohen (Bangor)	19
20	George J. Mitchell (South Portland)	Democratic	May 19, 1980 – Jan 3, 1995	Re-elected in 1988. Retired.	30	101st	29	Re-elected in 1984.	Jan 3, 1979 – Jan 3, 1997	Republican	William Cohen (Bangor)	19
20	George J. Mitchell (South Portland)	Democratic	May 19, 1980 – Jan 3, 1995	Re-elected in 1988. Retired.	30	102nd	30	Re-elected in 1990. Retired.	Jan 3, 1979 – Jan 3, 1997	Republican	William Cohen (Bangor)	19
20	George J. Mitchell (South Portland)	Democratic	May 19, 1980 – Jan 3, 1995	Re-elected in 1988. Retired.	30	103rd	30	Re-elected in 1990. Retired.	Jan 3, 1979 – Jan 3, 1997	Republican	William Cohen (Bangor)	19
21	Olympia Snowe (Auburn)	Republican	Jan 3, 1995 – Jan 3, 2013	Elected in 1994.	31	104th	30	Re-elected in 1990. Retired.	Jan 3, 1979 – Jan 3, 1997	Republican	William Cohen (Bangor)	19
21	Olympia Snowe (Auburn)	Republican	Jan 3, 1995 – Jan 3, 2013	Elected in 1994.	31	105th	31	Elected in 1996.	Jan 3, 1997 – present	Republican	Susan Collins (Bangor)	20
21	Olympia Snowe (Auburn)	Republican	Jan 3, 1995 – Jan 3, 2013	Elected in 1994.	31	106th	31	Elected in 1996.	Jan 3, 1997 – present	Republican	Susan Collins (Bangor)	20
21	Olympia Snowe (Auburn)	Republican	Jan 3, 1995 – Jan 3, 2013	Re-elected in 2000.	32	107th	31	Elected in 1996.	Jan 3, 1997 – present	Republican	Susan Collins (Bangor)	20
21	Olympia Snowe (Auburn)	Republican	Jan 3, 1995 – Jan 3, 2013	Re-elected in 2000.	32	108th	32	Re-elected in 2002.	Jan 3, 1997 – present	Republican	Susan Collins (Bangor)	20
21	Olympia Snowe (Auburn)	Republican	Jan 3, 1995 – Jan 3, 2013	Re-elected in 2000.	32	109th	32	Re-elected in 2002.	Jan 3, 1997 – present	Republican	Susan Collins (Bangor)	20
21	Olympia Snowe (Auburn)	Republican	Jan 3, 1995 – Jan 3, 2013	Re-elected in 2006. Retired.	33	110th	32	Re-elected in 2002.	Jan 3, 1997 – present	Republican	Susan Collins (Bangor)	20
21	Olympia Snowe (Auburn)	Republican	Jan 3, 1995 – Jan 3, 2013	Re-elected in 2006. Retired.	33	111th	33	Re-elected in 2008.	Jan 3, 1997 – present	Republican	Susan Collins (Bangor)	20
21	Olympia Snowe (Auburn)	Republican	Jan 3, 1995 – Jan 3, 2013	Re-elected in 2006. Retired.	33	112th	33	Re-elected in 2008.	Jan 3, 1997 – present	Republican	Susan Collins (Bangor)	20
22	Angus King (Brunswick)	Independent	Jan 3, 2013 – present	Elected in 2012.	34	113th	33	Re-elected in 2008.	Jan 3, 1997 – present	Republican	Susan Collins (Bangor)	20
22	Angus King (Brunswick)	Independent	Jan 3, 2013 – present	Elected in 2012.	34	114th	34	Re-elected in 2014.	Jan 3, 1997 – present	Republican	Susan Collins (Bangor)	20
22	Angus King (Brunswick)	Independent	Jan 3, 2013 – present	Elected in 2012.	34	115th	34	Re-elected in 2014.	Jan 3, 1997 – present	Republican	Susan Collins (Bangor)	20
22	Angus King (Brunswick)	Independent	Jan 3, 2013 – present	Re-elected in 2018.	35	116th	34	Re-elected in 2014.	Jan 3, 1997 – present	Republican	Susan Collins (Bangor)	20
22	Angus King (Brunswick)	Independent	Jan 3, 2013 – present	Re-elected in 2018.	35	117th	35	Re-elected in 2020. Lost re-election.	Jan 3, 1997 – present	Republican	Susan Collins (Bangor)	20
22	Angus King (Brunswick)	Independent	Jan 3, 2013 – present	Re-elected in 2018.	35	118th	35	Re-elected in 2020. Lost re-election.	Jan 3, 1997 – present	Republican	Susan Collins (Bangor)	20
22	Angus King (Brunswick)	Independent	Jan 3, 2013 – present	Re-elected in 2024.	36	119th	35	Re-elected in 2020. Lost re-election.	Jan 3, 1997 – present	Republican	Susan Collins (Bangor)	20
22	Angus King (Brunswick)	Independent	Jan 3, 2013 – present	Re-elected in 2024.	36	120th	32	Elected in 2026.	Taking office Jan 3, 2027	Democratic	Troy Jackson (elect) (Allagash)	21
22	Angus King (Brunswick)	Independent	Jan 3, 2013 – present	Re-elected in 2024.	36	121st	32	Elected in 2026.	Taking office Jan 3, 2027	Democratic	Troy Jackson (elect) (Allagash)	21
To be determined in the 2030 election.					32	122nd	32	Elected in 2026.	Taking office Jan 3, 2027	Democratic	Troy Jackson (elect) (Allagash)	21
To be determined in the 2030 election.					32	123rd	33	To be determined in the 2032 election.				

== See also ==
- Elections in Maine
- List of United States representatives from Maine
- Maine's congressional delegations
