= 1972 United States Senate election in Maine =

- November 7, 1972
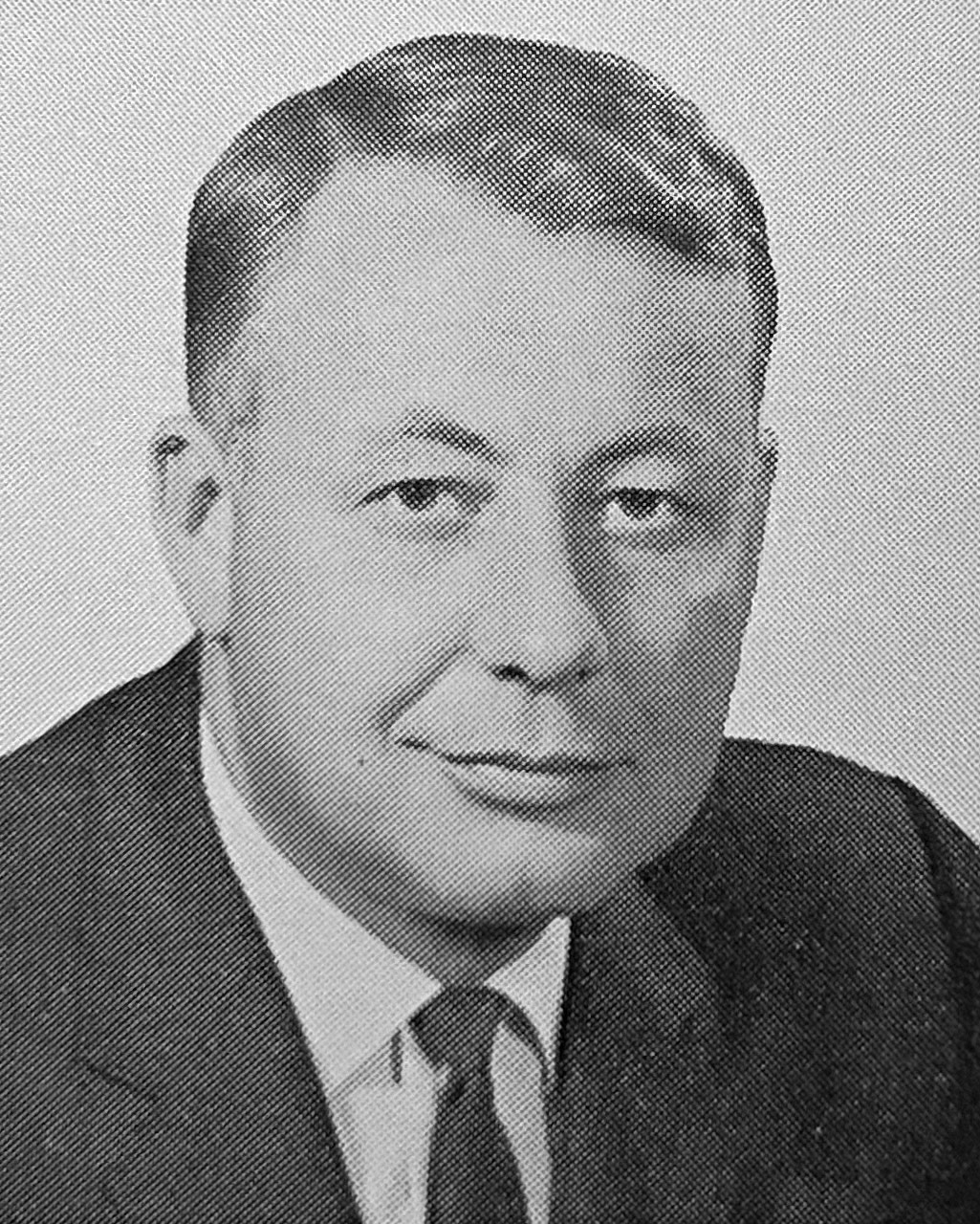

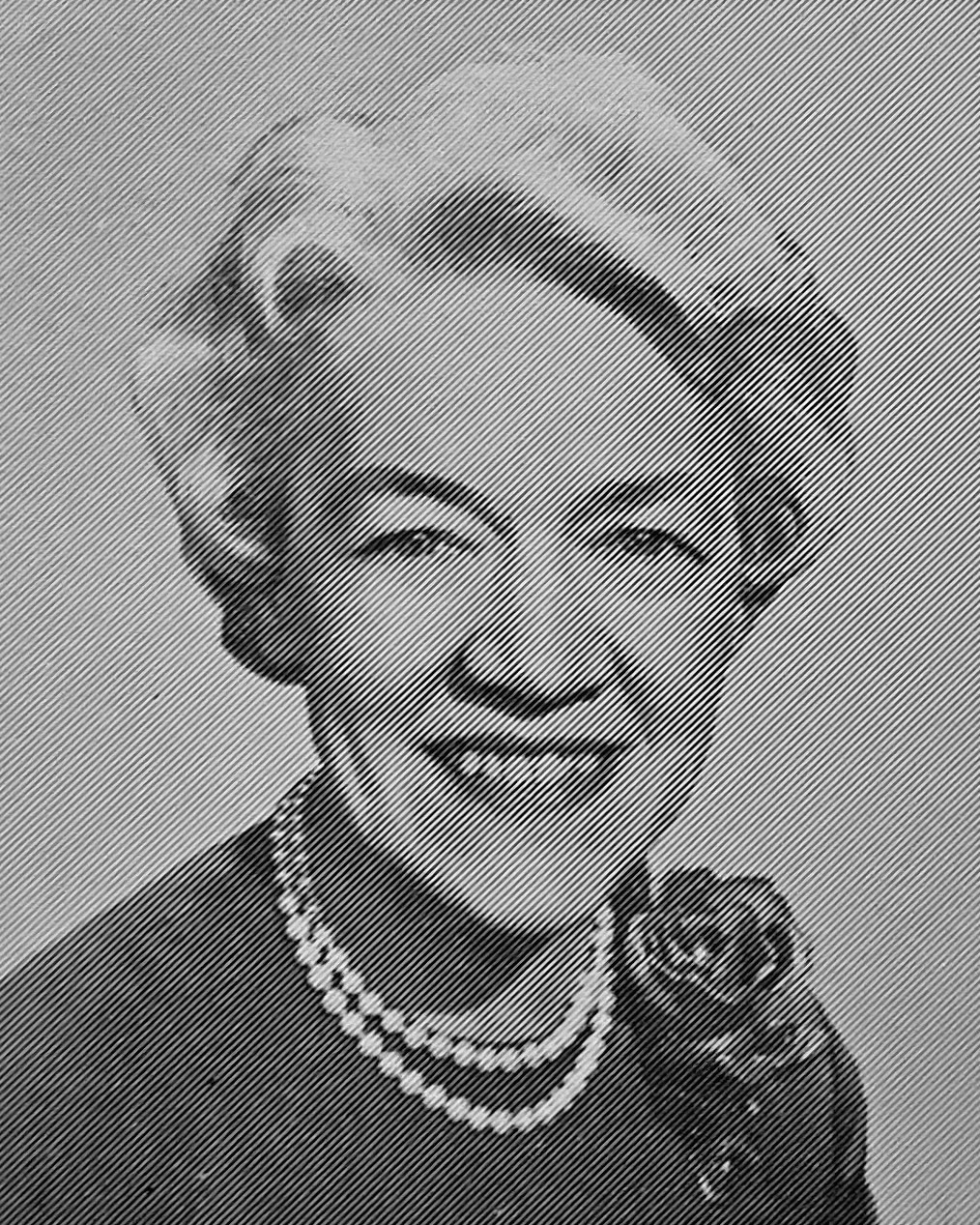
Nominee	William Hathaway	Margaret Chase Smith
Party	Democratic	Republican
Popular vote	224,270	197,040
Percentage	53.23%	46.77%
- Hathaway: 50–60% 60–70% 70–80% 80–90% >90% Smith: 50–60% 60–70% 70–80% 80–90% >90% Tie: 50%
U.S. senator before election
Margaret Chase Smith
Republican
Elected U.S. Senator
William Hathaway
Democratic

The 1972 United States Senate election in Maine was held on November 7, 1972. Incumbent Republican U.S. Senator Margaret Chase Smith ran for re-election to a fifth term, but was defeated by Democrat William Hathaway. This was the last time the Democrats won the Class 2 Senate seat from Maine until 2026.

Maine was one of fifteen states, alongside Alabama, Arkansas, Colorado, Delaware, Georgia, Iowa, Louisiana, Minnesota, Mississippi, Montana, New Hampshire, Rhode Island, South Dakota and West Virginia, that were won by Republican President Richard Nixon in 1972 that elected Democrats to the United States Senate.

== Background ==
A very popular senator, Margaret Chase Smith was at first seen as the overwhelming favorite to win the November election. However, after a disastrous meeting with college students at Colby College in Waterville, Maine on May 10, 1970, her standing was hurt gravely with young voters in Maine. In the meeting, she reaffirmed her strong support for the Vietnam War, while her Democratic colleague, Edmund Muskie, spoke out against it. However, the biggest blow came when she answered "No" to a student asking if U.S. troops were stationed in Laos. Immediately after, former Marine Everett Carson spoke into the microphone, explaining that he was a platoon commander in Vietnam and had been sent on search and destroy missions over the Laotian border and into Laotian territory. Smith was unable to respond, and the incident became widely publicized, leading to an even stronger feeling with voters that she was uninformed and out of touch with what they wanted. Furthermore, she lost support from the increasingly powerful women's movement, who endorsed her opponent instead.

== Republican primary ==
=== Candidates ===
- Robert A. G. Monks, attorney
- Margaret Chase Smith, U.S. senator since 1949

=== Results ===
1972 Maine Republican US Senate primary
Party	Candidate	Votes	%
Republican	Margaret Chase Smith (incumbent)	76,964	66.75%
Republican	Robert A. G. Monks	38,345	33.25%
Total votes		115,309	100.0%

== Democratic primary ==
=== Candidates ===
- William Hathaway, U.S. representative from Maine's 2nd congressional district since 1965
- Jack L. Smith, candidate for Senate in 1966

=== Results ===
General election results
Party	Candidate	Votes	%
Democratic	William Hathaway	61,921	90.82%
Democratic	Jack L. Smith	6,263	9.19%
Total votes		68,184	100.0%

== General election ==
Smith opted to run a simple campaign, employing few volunteers and making few appearances. She emphasized her record of public service, particularly the fact that she never missed a vote except for when she underwent hip surgery, setting a record of 2,941 consecutive votes on the Senate floor. Smith also practically ignored younger voters, many of whom were unfamiliar with her record and upset with her refusal to engage with them. Another key shortcoming of her campaign was her refusal of donations, spending only $4,130 on her general election campaign, as opposed to Hathaway's $200,000. Smith also refused to buy campaign advertisements, relying on pamphlets and bumper stickers to get her message out. She also had a press that was often hostile to her and her message, particularly Ralph Nader, who released a very damaging profile of her a month before the election was held.

Hathaway ran a very modern and energetic campaign, buying many advertisements and campaigning often. Crucially, he also won the support of the National Committee for an Effective Congress, who had previously supported Smith due to her opposition to McCarthyism in the 1950s. Hathaway's campaign also let outside figures, namely former Tennessee Senator Albert Gore Sr., criticize Smith's positions on policy issues such as an anti-ballistic missile system and the Vietnam War. By election day, Hathaway was seen as the likely victor, as his campaign had gained momentum dramatically over the past months.

=== Debate ===
1972 Maine United States Senate election debate
No.	Date	Host	Moderator	Link	Republican	Democratic
Key: P Participant A Absent N Not invited I Invited W Withdrawn						
Key: P Participant A Absent N Not invited I Invited W Withdrawn					Margaret Chase Smith	William Hathaway
1		Maine Public Broadcasting Network	David Platt		P	P

=== Results ===
General election results
Party	Candidate	Votes	%
Democratic	William Hathaway	224,270	53.23%
Republican	Margaret Chase Smith (incumbent)	197,040	46.77%
Total votes		421,310	100.0%
Democratic gain from Republican			

== See also ==
- 1972 United States Senate elections
