= Senator Collins (disambiguation) =

Susan Collins (born 1952) is a U.S. Senator from Maine since 1997.

Senator Collins may also refer to:

- Annazette Collins (born 1962), Illinois State Senate
- Dennis J. Collins (1900–1974), Illinois State Senate
- Donald Collins (Maine politician) (1925–2018), Maine State Senate
- Donald Collins (Vermont politician) (born 1942), Vermont State Senate
- E. B. Collins (1873–1967), Alaska Territorial Senate
- Earlean Collins (born 1937), Illinois State Senate
- Francis Dolan Collins (1841–1891), Pennsylvania State Senate
- Jacqueline Y. Collins (born 1949), Illinois State Senate
- Jay Collins (born 1976), Florida State Senate
- John F. Collins (1919–1995), Massachusetts State Senate
- Josiah Collins (North Carolina politician) (1807–1863), North Carolina State Senate
- Lakesia Collins (born 1985), Illinois State Senate
- LeRoy Collins (1909–1991), Florida State Senate
- Lorenzo D. Collins (1821–1898), New York State Senate
- Mac Collins (1944–2018), Georgia State Senate
- Michael F. Collins (1854–1928), New York State Senate
- Nancy Adams Collins (born 1947), Mississippi State Senate
- Oakley C. Collins (1916–1994), Ohio State Senate
- Patrick Collins (mayor) (1844–1905), Massachusetts State Senate
- Ronald F. Collins (fl. 2010s), Maine State Senate
- Samuel Collins (Maine politician) (1923–2012), Maine State Senate
- Thomas Collins (governor) (1732–1789), Delaware State Senate
- Vinson Allen Collins (1867–1966), Texas State Senate
- William O. Collins (1809–1880), Ohio State Senate
