= Patricia M. Collins =

American politician and civic leader

Mayor of Caribou, Maine
- In office 1981–1982

Personal details
- Born: Patricia McGuigan; April 14, 1927 Colombia
- Died: March 5, 2024 (aged 96) Caribou, Maine, US
- Spouse: Donald Collins (m. 1948; died 2018)
- Children: 6, including Susan
- Education: University of Maine (BA); University of Maine at Presque Isle (BA)
- Occupation: Civic leader

Patricia M. Collins (April 14, 1927 – March 5, 2024) was an American civic leader and politician who served as the mayor of Caribou, Maine from 1981 to 1982. She chaired numerous local and state boards and organizations, including the Caribou School Board, the Maine Committee for Judicial Responsibility and Disability, Catholic Charities Maine, and the University of Maine Board of Trustees. She was inducted into the Maine Women's Hall of Fame in 2005.

Collins was the matriarch of a political family: her husband, Donald Collins, was also a former mayor of Caribou and four-term state senator, and her daughter, Susan Collins, is the senior United States senator from Maine.

== Early life and education ==
Born Patricia McGuigan in Colombia and raised in Port Jervis, New York, Collins earned a bachelor's degree in mathematics from the University of Maine in 1970 and a second bachelor's degree in art from the University of Maine at Presque Isle.

== Career ==
Collins was active on many local and state boards and organizations. She was a member of the Caribou School Board from 1967 to 1975, serving as chair of that body in her final year. She was director of the Caribou Public Library, advisory board member of the Maine Public Broadcasting Network, member of the Cary Medical Center Auxiliary, member of the University of Maine at Presque Isle committee on graduate studies, member of the Aroostook County Emergency Medical Services Committee, and chair of the Red Cross Caribou Flood Disaster Fund. She was the religious education coordinator for the Holy Rosary Catholic Church for eight years.

She chaired the Maine Committee for Judicial Responsibility and Disability, and Catholic Charities Maine. In 1987 she became a member of the University of Maine Board of Trustees, serving as chairman of that board from 1991 to 1994. In 1993 she was a member of the board's five-person search committee for a new University of Maine chancellor following the resignation of Robert Woodbury.

=== Mayoralty ===
Collins joined the Caribou City Council in 1978. In January 1981 she was unanimously elected mayor of Caribou, making her the second woman to fill that post. Her appointment made her and her husband the first married couple to each serve as mayor of the city; Donald Collins was the second mayor of Caribou, in 1968.

In November 1981 she ran for a second term as mayor against a field of five candidates. Both she and incumbent deputy mayor Roy W. Doak retained their seats.

== Other activities ==
Collins is an artist. In 1991 she exhibited her portrait series of Maine legislators at several University of Maine venues.

== Honors and awards ==
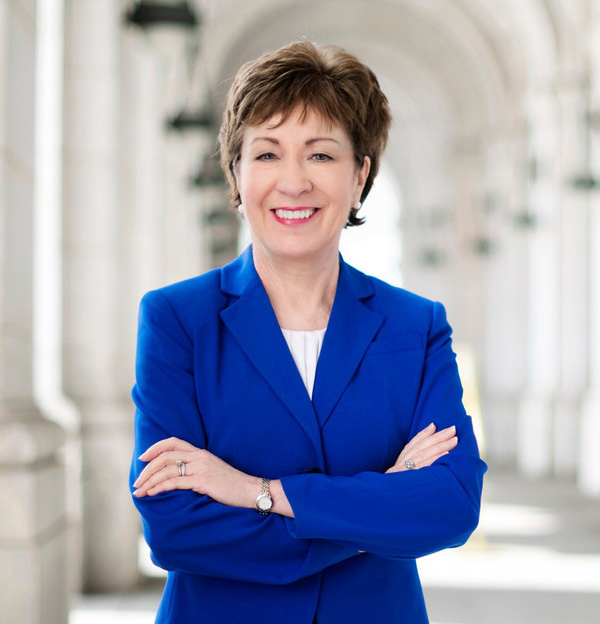
Susan Collins

In 2005 she was inducted into the Maine Women's Hall of Fame. With the induction of her daughter, United States Senator Susan Collins, in 2011, it marked the first time both a mother and daughter became members of the Maine Women's Hall of Fame.

== Family ==
She and her husband Donald had six children. In addition to his political career, Donald was the retired president of the S. W. Collins Company, a fifth-generation lumber business now led by two of their sons. Their daughter, Susan Collins, is currently serving her fifth term as the senior United States Senator from Maine.
