= Susan Collins =

American politician (born 1952)

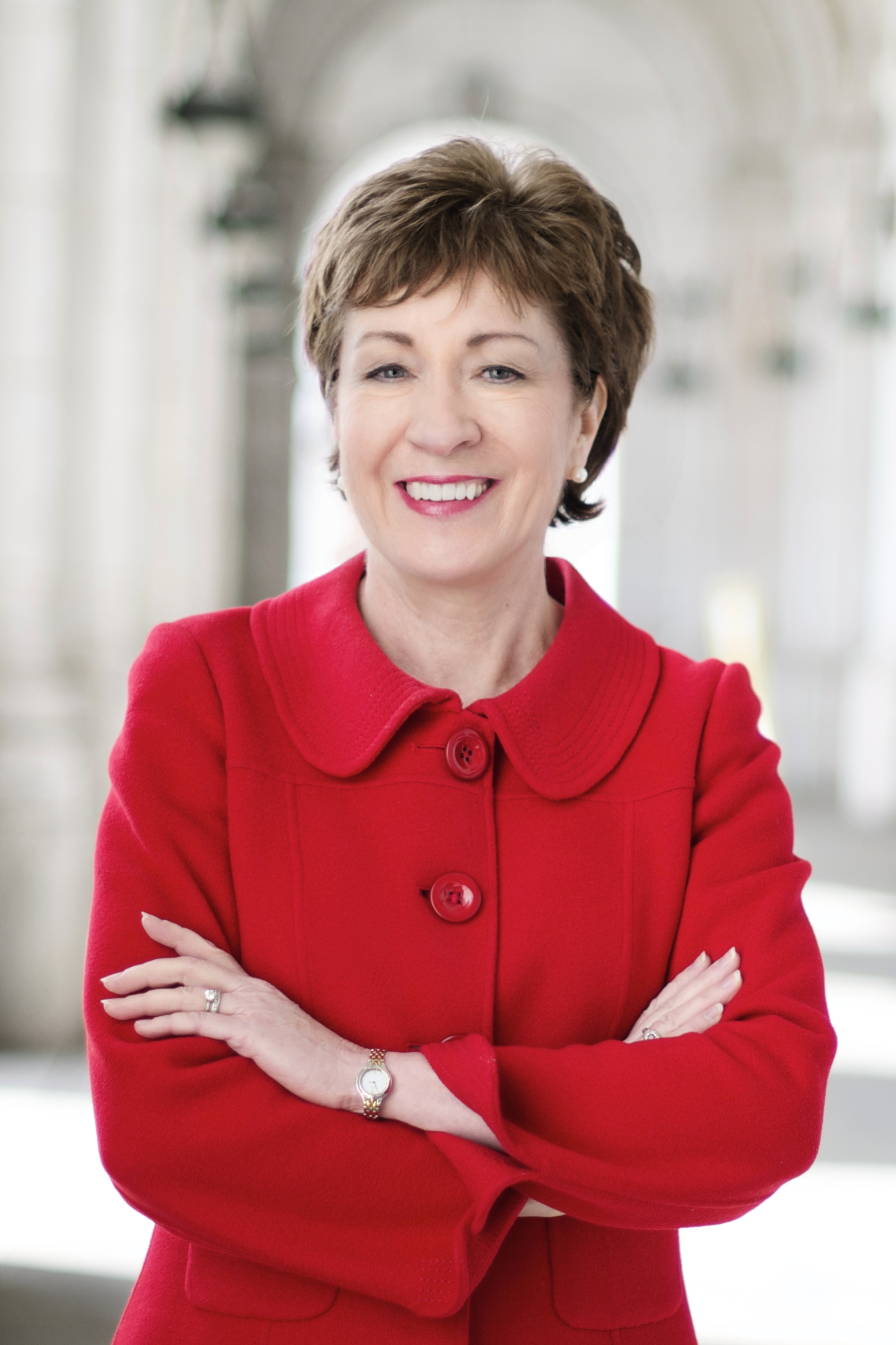
- Official portrait, 2014

United States Senator from Maine
- Incumbent
- Assumed office January 3, 1997 Serving with Angus King
- Preceded by: William Cohen
Committee positions
Chair of the Senate Appropriations Committee
Incumbent
Assumed office January 3, 2025
Preceded by	Patty Murray
Vice Chair of the Senate Appropriations Committee
In office January 3, 2023 – January 3, 2025
Preceded by	Richard Shelby
Succeeded by	Patty Murray
Chair of the Senate Aging Committee
In office January 3, 2015 – February 3, 2021
Preceded by	Bill Nelson
Succeeded by	Bob Casey Jr.
Ranking Member of the Senate Aging Committee
In office January 3, 2013 – January 3, 2015
Preceded by	Bob Corker
Succeeded by	Claire McCaskill
Ranking Member of the Senate Homeland Security Committee
In office January 3, 2007 – January 3, 2013
Preceded by	Joe Lieberman
Succeeded by	Tom Coburn
Chair of the Senate Homeland Security and Governmental Affairs Committee
In office January 3, 2003 – January 3, 2007
Preceded by	Joe Lieberman
Succeeded by	Joe Lieberman

Personal details
- Born: Susan Margaret Collins; December 7, 1952 (age 73) Caribou, Maine, U.S.
- Party: Republican
- Spouse: Thomas Daffron (m. 2012)
- Parents: Donald Collins (father); Patricia McGuigan (mother)
- Relatives: Samuel Collins (uncle)
- Education: St. Lawrence University (BA)
- Website: Senate website Campaign website
- Collins's voice Collins supporting Brett Kavanaugh for the Supreme Court; Recorded October 5, 2018

Susan Margaret Collins (born December 7, 1952) is an American politician who has served since 1997 as a United States senator for Maine. A member of the Republican Party, she is Maine's longest-serving member of Congress and the longest-serving Republican woman in the Senate.

Born in Caribou, Maine, Collins is a graduate of St. Lawrence University in Canton, New York. Beginning her career as a staff assistant for Senator William Cohen in 1975, she became staff director of the Oversight of Government Management Subcommittee of the Committee on Governmental Affairs in 1981. Governor John R. McKernan Jr. then appointed her commissioner of the Maine Department of Professional and Financial Regulation in 1987. In 1992, President George H. W. Bush appointed her director of the Small Business Administration's regional office in Boston. Collins became a deputy state treasurer in the office of the Treasurer and Receiver-General of Massachusetts in 1993. After moving back to Maine in 1994, she became the Republican nominee for governor of Maine in the 1994 general election. She was the first female major-party nominee for the post, finishing third in a four-way race with 23% of the vote. After that, she became the founding director of the Center for Family Business at Husson University.

Collins was first elected to the Senate in 1996 and was reelected four times until losing to Democrat Troy Jackson in 2026. She chaired the Senate Special Committee on Aging from 2015 to 2021 and the Senate Committee on Homeland Security and Governmental Affairs from 2003 to 2007. Collins is the dean of Maine's congressional delegation and was the only New England Republican in the 116th through 119th Congresses. She is one of only two Republicans representing a Northeastern state in the Senate. From 2019 to 2026, she was the only Republican holding statewide office in Maine. In 2021, Collins became the longest-serving Republican female senator in history, surpassing Margaret Chase Smith, who held the same Senate seat.

Generally seen as a moderate Republican, Collins is often a pivotal vote in the Senate. She was one of three Republicans to vote against a partial repeal of the Affordable Care Act. She was the sole Republican to vote against confirming Amy Coney Barrett to the Supreme Court and one of three to vote to confirm Ketanji Brown Jackson. Meanwhile, as a pro-choice Republican, Collins drew scrutiny for her vote to confirm Brett Kavanaugh, who joined the majority opinion in Dobbs v. Jackson Women's Health Organization, which overturned Roe v. Wade. In procedural issues, she has maintained her support for the 60-vote Senate threshold, arguing for bipartisan compromise and preserving the filibuster.

During the impeachment trial of Bill Clinton, Collins was one of the few Republican senators who voted to acquit him on both charges. During the first impeachment trial of Donald Trump, Collins joined most other Senate Republicans in voting to acquit on both charges. In his second impeachment trial, she was one of seven Republicans to vote to convict Trump of incitement of insurrection.

== Early life and education ==
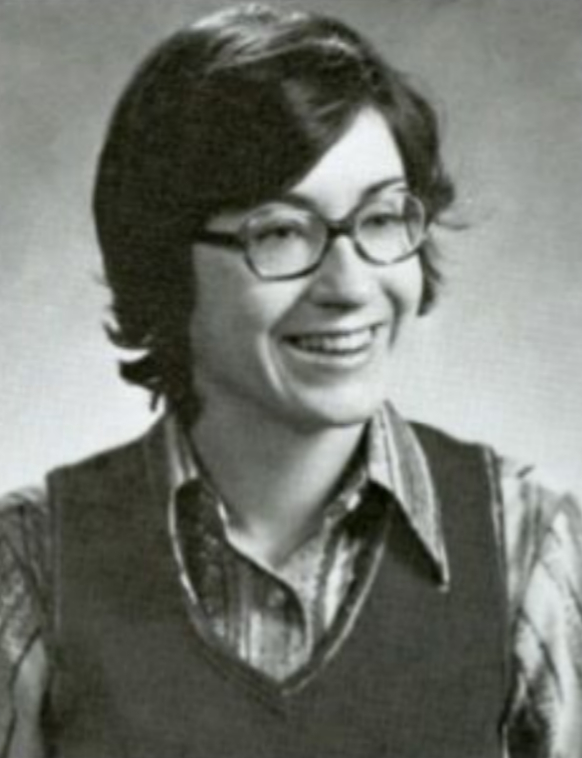
Collins in the St. Lawrence University's 1975 yearbook

One of six children, Collins was born in Caribou, Maine, where her family operates a lumber business established by her great-great-great-grandfather, Samuel W. Collins, in 1844. Her parents, Patricia (née McGuigan) and Donald Collins (1925–2018), each served as mayor of Caribou. Her father, a decorated veteran of World War II, also served in the Maine legislature, with one term in the House, and four in the Senate. Her uncle, Samuel W. Collins Jr., sat on the Maine Supreme Judicial Court from 1988 to 1994 and served in the Maine Senate from 1973 to 1984. Her family owns S. W. Collins, a lumberyard and hardware store chain in northern Maine; her brother Samuel serves as president of S. W. Collins.

Collins attended Caribou High School, where she was president of the student council. During her senior year of high school in 1971, she was chosen to participate in the U.S. Senate Youth Program, through which she visited Washington, D.C., for the first time and had a two-hour conversation with Maine's first female United States Senator, Margaret Chase Smith, also a Republican. Collins is the first program delegate elected to the Senate and holds the seat once held by Smith. After graduating from high school, she continued her education at St. Lawrence University in Canton, New York. Like her father, she was elected to the Phi Beta Kappa national academic honor society. She graduated from St. Lawrence magna cum laude with a Bachelor of Arts degree in government in 1975.

== Early political career (1975–1996) ==
Following graduation, Collins worked as a legislative assistant to U.S. Representative and later U.S. Senator William Cohen from 1975 to 1987. She was staff director of the Oversight of Government Management Subcommittee on the United States Senate Committee on Homeland Security and Governmental Affairs from 1981 to 1987.

In 1987, Collins joined the cabinet of Governor John R. McKernan Jr. as Commissioner of the Department of Professional and Financial Regulation. President George H. W. Bush appointed her the New England regional director for the Small Business Administration in 1992. After briefly serving in this post until the 1992 presidential election, which Bill Clinton won, she moved to Massachusetts and became Deputy State Treasurer of Massachusetts under Joe Malone in 1993.

Returning to Maine, Collins won an eight-way Republican primary in the 1994 gubernatorial election, becoming the first woman nominated by a major party for governor of Maine. Collins had considered leaving the crowded gubernatorial race to seek election to Maine's 2nd congressional district, with incumbent Republican Olympia Snowe seeking election to the U.S. Senate, but ultimately chose to stay in the gubernatorial race. During the campaign, she received little support from Republican leaders and was criticized by conservative groups for her more liberal views on social issues. She lost the general election, receiving 23% of the vote and placing third behind Democrat Joseph E. Brennan and the winner, independent candidate Angus King.

In December 1994, Collins became the founding executive director of the Richard E. Dyke Center for Family Business at Husson College. She served in this post until 1996, when she announced her candidacy for the U.S. Senate seat being vacated by her former boss, William Cohen, who retired to become United States Secretary of Defense under President Bill Clinton. With Cohen's public endorsement, she won a difficult four-way primary and faced Brennan in the general election, a partial rematch of the 1994 gubernatorial race. She defeated Brennan, 49% to 44%.

== U.S. Senate (1997–2027) ==
=== Elections ===
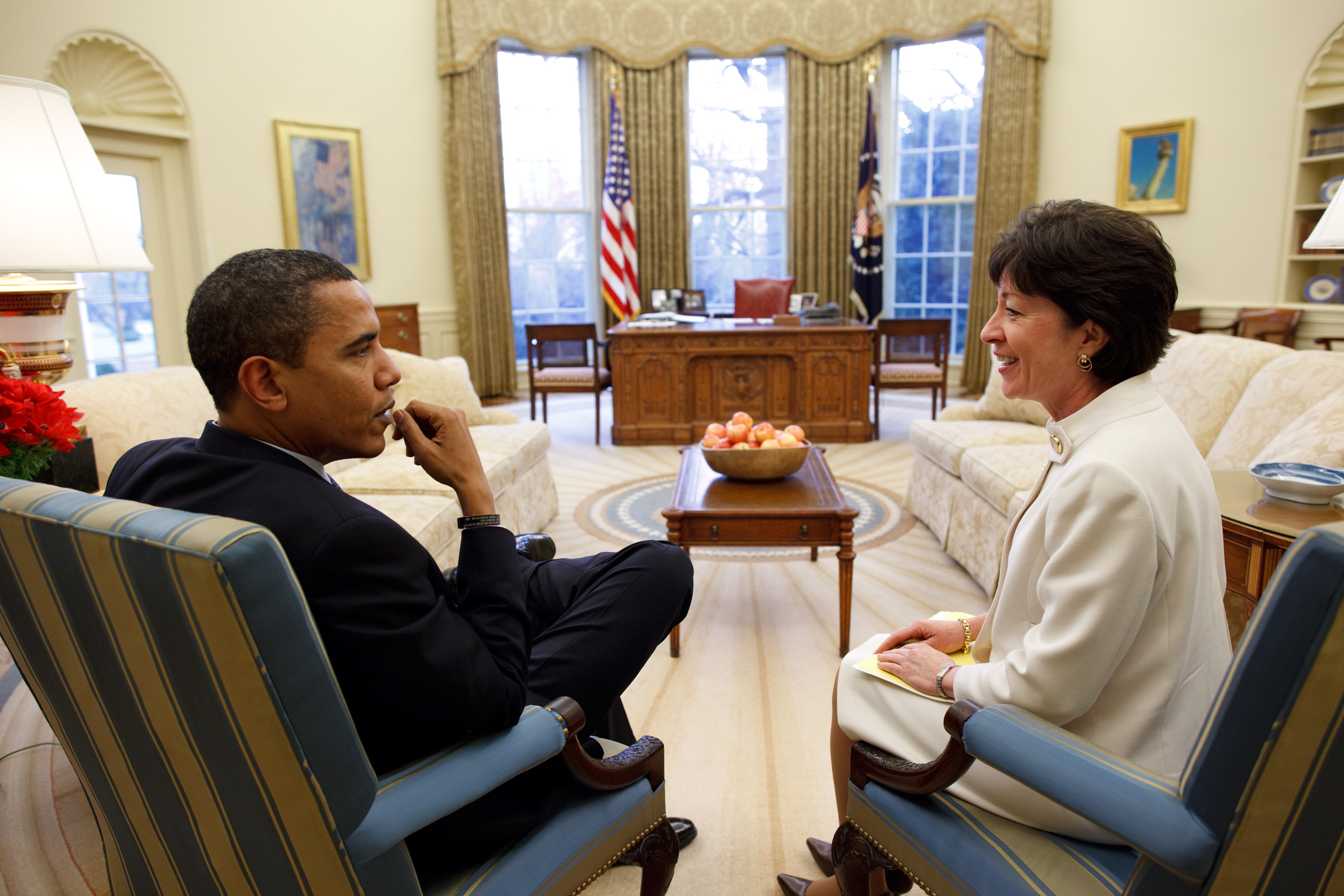
Collins with President Barack Obama in the Oval Office in 2009

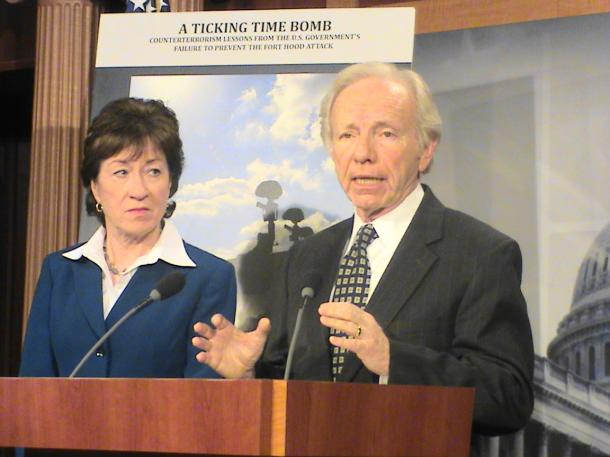
Collins with Joe Lieberman

Collins was elected to the Senate in 1996. During the campaign she pledged that, if elected, she would serve only two terms.

Collins was reelected in 2002 over State Senator Chellie Pingree, 58.4% to 41.6%, in 2008 over Representative Tom Allen, 61.5% to 38.5%, and in 2014 over Shenna Bellows, 68.5% to 31.5%. In each of those campaigns, she carried every county in Maine.

In 2020, Collins was challenged by Democratic State House Speaker Sara Gideon. The hotly contested race became the most expensive in Maine history, with Collins spending $23 million and Gideon nearly $48 million. The race also had national implications, as defeating Collins was a key part of the Democrats' strategy to achieve a Senate majority. Despite trailing Gideon in every public poll of the race, Collins defeated Gideon by a decisive margin.

In 2009, Collins was called one of "the last survivors of a once common species of moderate Northeastern Republican". She is considered a centrist Republican and an influential player in the Senate.

Although she shared a centrist ideology with Maine's former senator, Olympia Snowe, Collins is considered a "half-turn more conservative" than Snowe. She was consistently endorsed by the Human Rights Campaign, a major LGBT rights organization, until 2020. She supported John McCain in the 2008 presidential election. She became the state's senior senator in 2013 when Snowe left the Senate and was replaced by independent Angus King, who defeated Collins in the 1994 governor election.

==== 2026 election ====
In the 2026 election, Collins was set to face Democratic nominee Graham Platner after he won the primary, but on July 7, Politico published an article in which Platner was accused of rape by a former girlfriend; this resulted in the withdrawal of numerous endorsements, and although he denied the allegation, Platner withdrew from the race on July 10. The state Democrats nominated Troy Jackson, a former president of the Maine Senate, to replace Platner on the ballot.

Between January 2025 and May 2026, 79 billionaires donated almost $10 million, a third of all donations, to Collins's campaign and political action committees supporting her election. Around $9 million went to Pine Tree Results PAC, a super PAC.

Jackson defeated Collins, as Democrats won nine Republican-held Senate seats in the 2026 midterm election.

=== Tenure ===
==== First term ====
In the 1990s, Collins played an important role during the Senate's impeachment trial of Bill Clinton when she and Snowe sponsored a motion that would have allowed the Senate to vote separately on the charges and the sentence. The motion failed, and Snowe and Collins voted to acquit, believing that while Clinton had committed perjury, that was not grounds for removal from office.

In 1997, the Senate adopted a broader investigation into White House and congressional campaign fund-raising practices than Senate Republicans initially wanted. Collins said there were "a number of allegations that may or may not be illegal, but they may be improper."

In 2001, Collins authored a measure that granted the United States Secretary of Education authority to grant waivers that would relieve reservists and members of the National Guard from making federal student loan payments during active duty and grant the same privileges to victims and families of those affected by the September 11 attacks. The bill passed the Senate and House in December 2001.

In 2002, the Senate overwhelmingly approved the creation of the Department of Homeland Security while a Democratic effort to remove the bill's provisions fell short on a 52-to-47 vote that came after President George W. Bush lobbied against the vote. Collins and other senators said that Senate and House Republicans, as well as the White House, had given them an "ironclad promise" to essentially rescind provisions in the first spending bill to pass Congress the following year.

==== Second term ====
In 2004, Collins was a primary sponsor of legislation overhauling the U.S. intelligence community by creating a new post, Director of National Intelligence, to oversee budgets and most assets of the spy agencies, and mandating that federal agencies establish minimum standards for states pertaining to issuing driver's licenses and birth certificates along with directing the United States Department of Homeland Security to form standards for ID used to board airplanes. Collins said, "This was the most difficult bill to bring from conception to birth that I can imagine being involved with. But that makes the victory doubly satisfying." Bush signed the Intelligence Reform and Terrorism Prevention Act on December 17, 2004.

In May 2005, Collins was one of 14 senators (seven Democrats and seven Republicans) to forge a compromise on the Democrats' use of the judicial filibuster, thus allowing the Republican leadership to end debate without having to exercise the nuclear option. Under the agreement, Democrats agreed they would filibuster Bush's judicial nominees only in "extraordinary circumstances"; three Bush appellate court nominees (Janice Rogers Brown, Priscilla Owen, and William Pryor) would receive a vote by the full Senate; and two others, Henry Saad and William Myers, were expressly denied such protection (both eventually withdrew their names from consideration).

In 2007, Collins introduced the Accountability in Government Contracting Act, which removed a 3% withholding tax for federal contractors and required the Federal Acquisition Institute to develop a strategic acquisition plan.

In October 2008, Collins criticized robocalls by the McCain campaign claiming that Barack Obama "has worked closely with domestic terrorist Bill Ayers, whose organization bombed the U.S. Capitol, the Pentagon, a judge's home and killed Americans", asserting that those "kind of tactics have no place in Maine politics" and urging McCain to cease the calls immediately.

==== Third term ====
In 2009, Collins played a role in removing $870 million in pandemic flu funding from a $787 billion stimulus package. She said she had done so on procedural grounds: "It is the regular appropriations process that is the appropriate vehicle for considering funding for many of these programs that, while worthwhile, do not boost our economy."

In April 2010, Collins and Senator Joe Lieberman issued a subpoena seeking documents and interviews associated with the American government's investigation into the conduct of investigators during their interactions with Nidal Hasan before the Fort Hood shooting. The Pentagon announced that the Obama administration would not authorize Senate investigators to question intelligence agents who reviewed e-mails between Hasan and an extremist Islamic cleric before the shooting. Collins and Lieberman issued a statement accusing the Departments of Justice and Defense of refusing "to provide access to their agents who reportedly reviewed Major Hasan's communications with radical extremist cleric Anwar al Awlaki and to transcripts of prosecution interviews with Hasan's associates and superiors, which DOD already provided to its internal review."

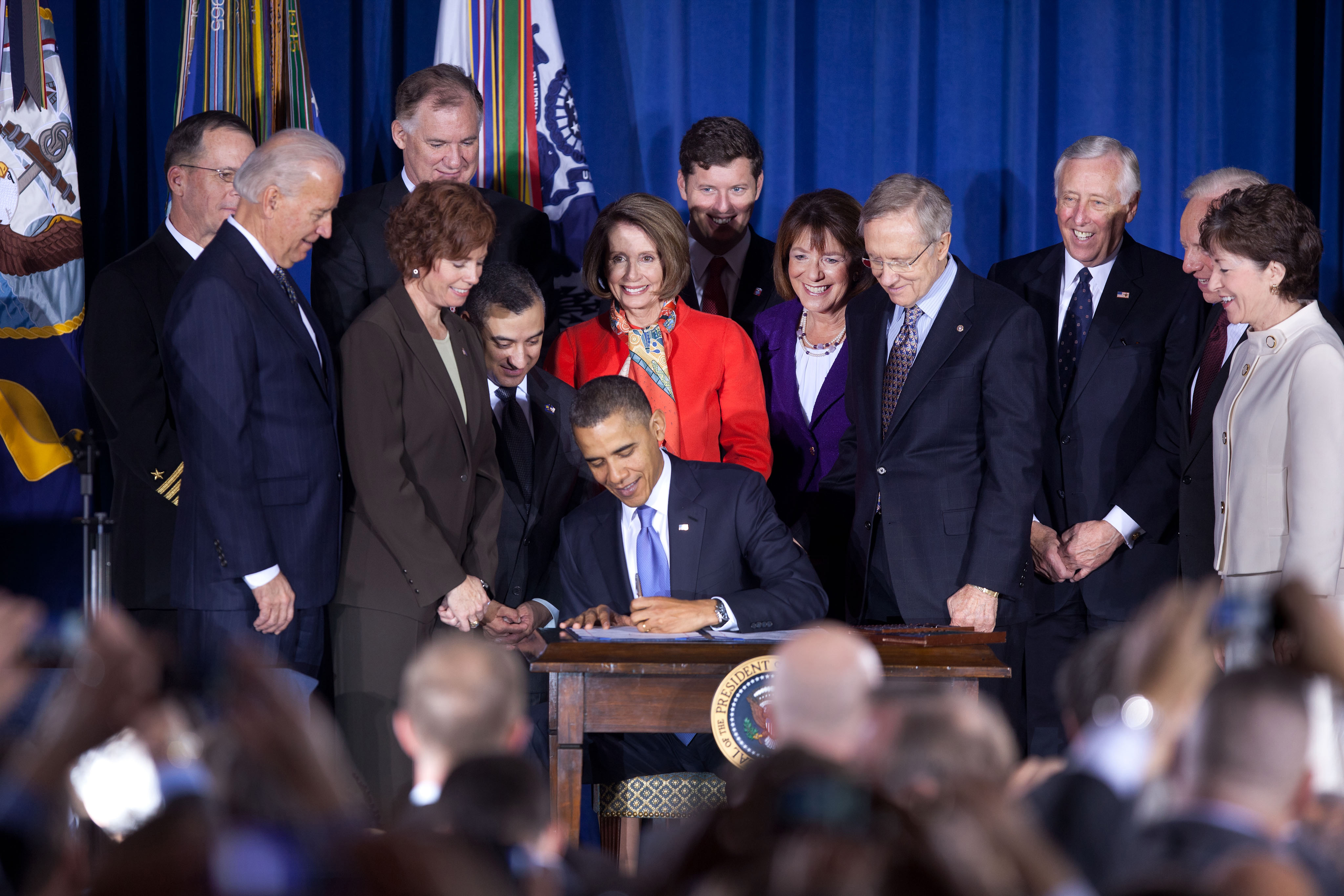
Collins, right, stands near President Barack Obama as he signs the repeal of Don't Ask Don't Tell.

In May 2010, Collins and Snowe were the only two Republicans to vote for an unsuccessful Democratic measure that would have prevented bailouts, highlighted financial products of complexity and toughened consumer protection.

In February 2013, Collins announced her opposition to the confirmation of Chuck Hagel as Secretary of Defense, citing her belief that Hagel's "past positions, votes and statements [do not] match the challenges of our time." The announcement came as a surprise, as Collins was considered a possible supporter of his nomination, and it occurred while the nomination was being filibustered. The filibuster on Hagel's nomination was defeated, and he was confirmed later that month.

In May 2013, following a report that the Internal Revenue Service had put additional scrutiny on conservative groups, Collins said the revelation "contributes to the profound distrust that the American people have in government" and added that she was disappointed that Obama "hasn't personally condemned this and spoken out".

In April 2014, the Senate debated the Minimum Wage Fairness Act (S. 1737; 113th Congress). The bill would have amended the Fair Labor Standards Act of 1938 to increase the federal minimum wage to $10.10 per hour over two years. The bill was strongly supported by Obama and many Democratic senators but strongly opposed by Republicans in the Senate and House. Collins tried to negotiate a compromise bill that centrist Republicans could agree to but was unable to do so.

==== Fourth term ====
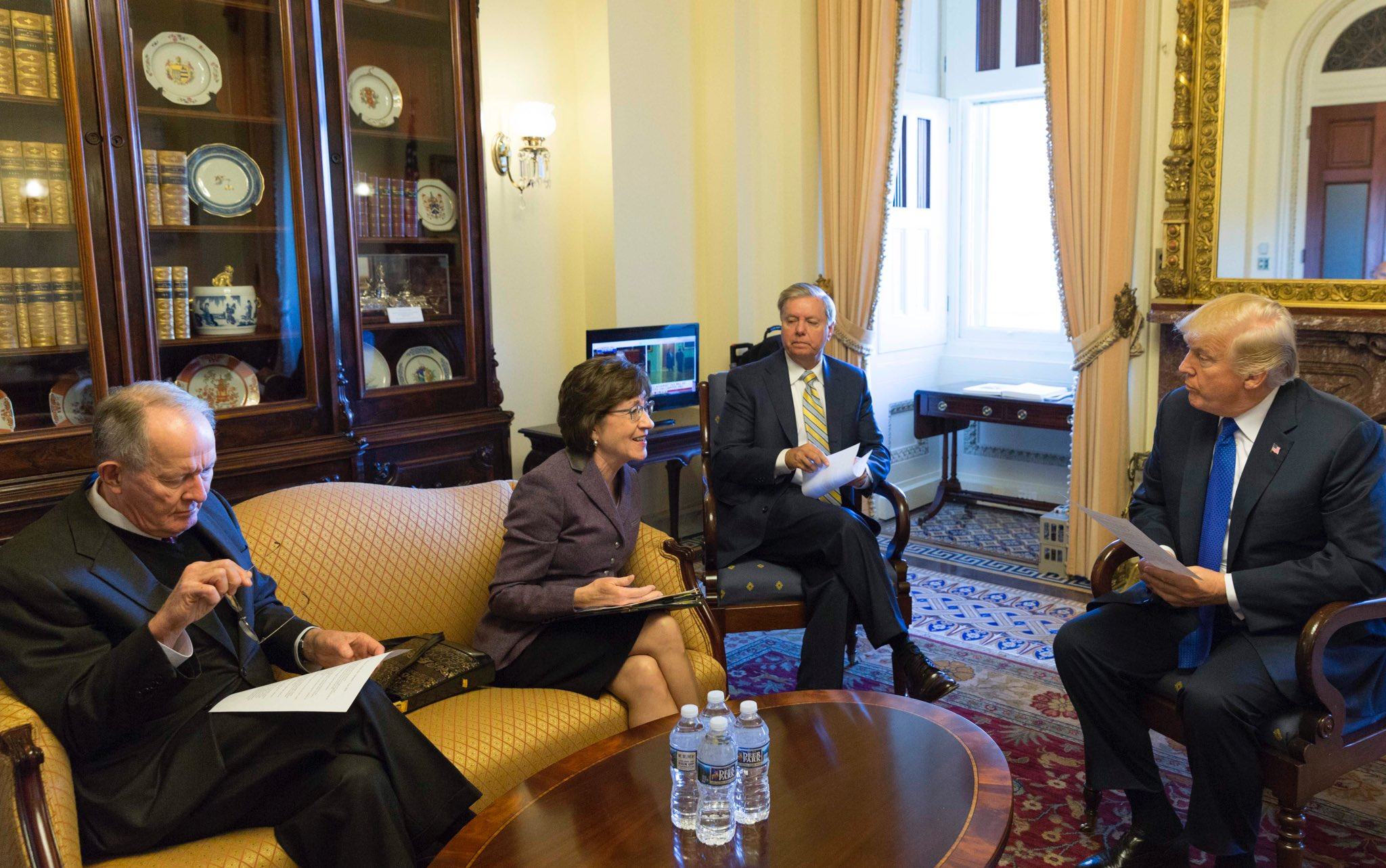
Collins, Lamar Alexander, and Lindsey Graham meet with President Donald Trump in November 2017.

In May 2016, the Senate passed an appropriations bill containing an amendment by Collins that she said would help prevent the Department of Housing and Urban Development from gaining "national zoning authority for every neighborhood in our country". The legislation was given a veto threat by the White House, which was said by the Office of Management and Budget to oppose "the inclusion of problematic ideological provisions that are beyond the scope of funding legislation".

In 2016, Collins authored the Safe Treatments and Opportunities to Prevent Pain Act, a provision intended to encourage the National Institutes of Health to further its research into opioid therapy alternatives for pain management, and the Infant Plan of Safe Care Act, which mandated that states ensure safe care plans are developed for infants who are drug-dependent before they are discharged from hospitals. These provisions were included in the Comprehensive Addiction and Recovery Act, legislation that created programs and expanded treatment access alongside implementing $181 million in new spending as part of an attempt to curb heroin and opioid addiction. Obama signed the Comprehensive Addiction and Recovery Act into law on July 22, 2016.

On August 8, 2016, Collins announced that she would not vote for Donald Trump, the Republican nominee in the 2016 presidential election. She said that as a lifelong Republican she did not make the decision lightly but felt he was unsuitable for office, "based on his disregard for the precept of treating others with respect, an idea that should transcend politics". She considered voting for the Libertarian Party's ticket or a write-in candidate.

In the 2016 United States presidential election, Collins received one electoral vote for vice president from a faithless elector in Washington.

In January 2017, Collins and Senator Lisa Murkowski voted for Trump's nominee for Secretary of Education, Betsy DeVos, within the Senate Health, Education, Labor and Pensions Committee, passing DeVos's nomination by a vote of 12–11 to allow the full Senate to vote. Collins justified her vote, saying, "Presidents are entitled to considerable deference in the selection of Cabinet members." Later, she and Murkowski were the only Republicans to break party lines and vote against DeVos's confirmation. This caused a 50–50 tie that was broken by Senate President Mike Pence to confirm DeVos.

In March 2017, Collins said she could not support the American Health Care Act, the House Republicans' plan to repeal and replace the Affordable Care Act. She announced she would vote against the Senate version of the Republican bill to repeal Obamacare. Collins also clarified that she opposed repealing the ACA without a replacement proposal. On July 26, Collins was one of seven Republicans in voting against repealing the ACA without a suitable replacement. On July 27, she joined two other Republicans in voting against the "skinny" repeal of the ACA. In October, Collins called on Trump to support a bipartisan congressional effort led by Lamar Alexander and Patty Murray to reinstate insurer payments, saying that what Trump was doing was "affecting people's access and the cost of health care right now".

On December 14, 2017, the day the FCC was set to hold a vote on net neutrality, Collins and King sent the FCC a letter asking that the vote be postponed to allow public hearings on the merits of repealing net neutrality. They expressed concerns that repealing net neutrality could adversely affect the U.S. economy. As part of this drive, Collins is reported to support using the authority under the Congressional Review Act to nullify the FCC's repeal vote. In 2018, Collins was one of three Republicans voting with Democrats to repeal rule changes enacted by the Republican-controlled FCC. The measure was meant to restore Obama-era net neutrality rules.

In 2017, The Lugar Center, a Washington, D.C.-based nonprofit founded by Senator Richard Lugar, released a bipartisan index in cooperation with Georgetown University that ranked Collins the most bipartisan senator during the first session of the 115th Congress.

In January 2018, in response to the Trump administration's not implementing congressionally approved sanctions on Russia, Collins said it was confirmed Russia had tried to interfere in the 2016 U.S. presidential election, adding, "not only should there be a price to pay in terms of sanctions, but also we need to put safeguards in place right now for the elections for this year." She noted that the legislation received bipartisan support and predicted Russia would also attempt to interfere in the 2018 elections. In January 2019, Collins was one of 11 Republican senators to vote to advance legislation intended to block Trump from lifting sanctions on three Russian companies. She said she disagreed with "the easing of the sanctions because I think it sends the wrong message to Russia and to the oligarch and close ally of Mr. Putin, Oleg Deripaska, who will in my judgment continue to maintain considerable [ownership] under the Treasury's plan."

In 2018, Collins and Senators Tim Kaine, Catherine Cortez Masto, and Shelley Moore Capito authored the Building Our Largest Dementia (BOLD) Infrastructure for Alzheimer's Act, legislation centered on providing a public health approach to Alzheimer's. The bill would authorize $20 million annually to establish the "Alzheimer's Disease and Related Dementias Public Health Centers of Excellence" and aid statewide efforts to promote brain health and reduce cognitive decline. It passed the Senate and House and was signed by Trump in January 2019.

In September 2018, Collins authored two bills as part of the Opioid Crisis Response Act, a bipartisan package of 70 Senate bills that would alter programs across multiple agencies in an effort to prevent opioids from being shipped through the U.S. Postal Service and grant doctors the ability to prescribe medications designed to wean opioid addictions. The bills passed 99 to 1.

In February 2019, Collins was one of five senators to sponsor legislation authorizing the Treasury Department to mint coins honoring George H. W. Bush and Barbara Bush under the Presidential $1 Coin Act of 2005 and introduced the Reviving America's Scenic Byways Act of 2019 along with Ben Cardin. The bill required the Secretary of Transportation to request nominations and make determinations in regard to roads that would be designed under a voluntary, community-based program and was signed into law by Trump in September of that year. After the Senate Intelligence Committee held a closed-door meeting with Michael Cohen, Collins said senators "clearly need to re-interview some witnesses whose accounts [Cohen] contradicts". Her comment was seen as hinting at the Intelligence Committee's interest in speaking with Donald Trump Jr. again. In June, Collins cosponsored an amendment to form the John S. McCain III Human Rights Commission, which would hold hearings and briefings on human rights violations ahead of collaborations with the Trump administration to address the violations, and be included in a defense authorization bill McCain had helped create as Armed Services Committee chairman.

In her May 2019 commencement speech at Maine Maritime Academy, Collins said getting the Senate to approve funding for a new training ship for the academy was her "number one priority" and that funding was included in Trump's proposed budget while she would still seek further funds through other measures.

In July 2019, Collins cosponsored the Fallen Journalists Memorial Act, a bill introduced by Ben Cardin and Rob Portman that would create a new, privately funded memorial that would be constructed on federal lands in Washington, D.C. in order to honor journalists, photographers, and broadcasters who died in the line of duty. Collins called freedom of the press "one of our fundamental constitutional rights" and spoke of the risks of reprisals faced by reporters around the world for their work.

In February 2020, Collins voted "not guilty" on both articles in the first impeachment trial of Donald Trump.

On October 26, 2020, Collins was the only Republican senator to vote against the confirmation of Trump's nominee Amy Coney Barrett to the Supreme Court. Barrett was confirmed by a vote of 52–48.

==== Fifth term ====
Collins giving her 2021 United States Electoral College vote count speech after the January 6 United States Capitol attack

On January 6, 2021, Collins was participating in the certification of the Electoral College vote count when Trump supporters attacked the United States Capitol. She was on the Senate floor listening to speeches related to the objection to counting Arizona's votes when the Sergeant at Arms of the U.S. Senate and U.S. Capitol Police removed Vice President Mike Pence and Senators Mitch McConnell and Chuck Schumer. She called the experience "frightening and appalling." Collins later called the attack "a dangerous, shameful, and outrageous attack on our democracy" and blamed Trump for "working up the crowd and inciting this mob". She called on him to call off the rioters. When Congress reconvened after the Capitol was secure, Collins voted to certify the count.

Toward the end of January 2021, Collins led a group of 10 Republican senators who requested that President Joe Biden join bipartisan negotiations when creating his COVID-19 economic relief package. After meeting with the group, Biden opted to pass his relief package using the reconciliation process, for which he did not need Republican support.

On February 13, 2021, Collins was one of seven Republican senators to vote to convict Trump in his second impeachment trial.

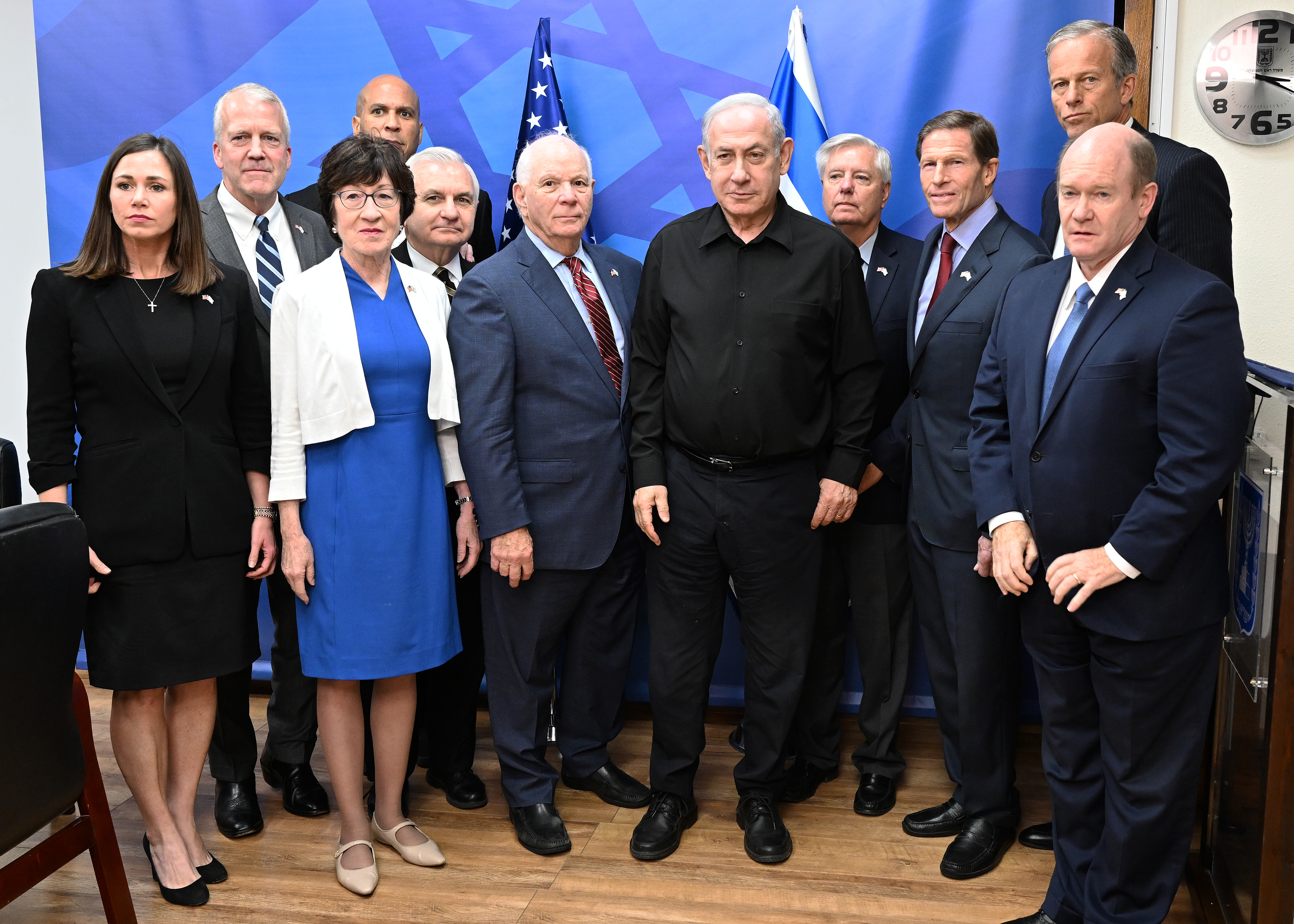
Collins with Israeli Prime Minister Benjamin Netanyahu in Israel on October 22, 2023

Collins cast her 8,000th consecutive roll call vote on October 28, 2021; only Chuck Grassley and William Proxmire had longer streaks. On April 19, 2024, the Senate recognized her 9,000th vote that night, surpassing Grassley's 8,927-vote streak earlier in March. In June 2026, senators in both parties lauded Collins for casting a record 10,000 consecutive votes in the Senate.

Collins voted to confirm Ketanji Brown Jackson to the Supreme Court, making her one of the only three GOP senators to support her nomination, the other two being Lisa Murkowski and Mitt Romney.

In February 2025, Collins voted to confirm Trump nominees Robert F. Kennedy Jr. for United States Secretary of Health and Human Services and Russell Vought for Office of Management and Budget budget director.

In May 2025, Collins criticized the Trump administration for cutting science funding and firing federal scientists.

On June 29, 2025, Collins voted to move the One Big Beautiful Bill Act through the legislative process to file a "number of amendments". She ultimately voted against it.

Collins and CEO Martin Kao (second to left) celebrate an $8 million contract awarded to Navatek, 2019

In September 2026, ProPublica reported that in 2019, a political action committee (PAC) supporting Collins, asked Martin Kao, chief executive of defense contractor Navatek, for a $500,000 donation. Collins's office directed millions of dollars of government contracts to Navatek after Kao, several employees, and family members made contributions to Collins's campaign, which were characterized as illegal straw donations. Kao was convicted in 2025 and sentenced to 33 months in prison. He told the FBI the donations were part of a pay-to-play operation to trade donations for government contracts. An FBI spokesperson said the agency had investigated Kao's claims against Collins years earlier and "ultimately found nothing implicating Senator Collins or Senator Collins' campaign". In September 2026, Collins's office said it had "fully cooperated" with the FBI, and that the matter was resolved in 2021 when the campaign disgorged the illegal contributions. The investigation conclusively ended in 2026 when the DOJ's Public Integrity Section was dismantled. Collins's office denied Kao's allegations, and the head of the pro-Collins PAC denied that he had ever discussed with Collins or her subordinates any donations by Kao or Navatek to his PAC.

=== Committee assignments ===
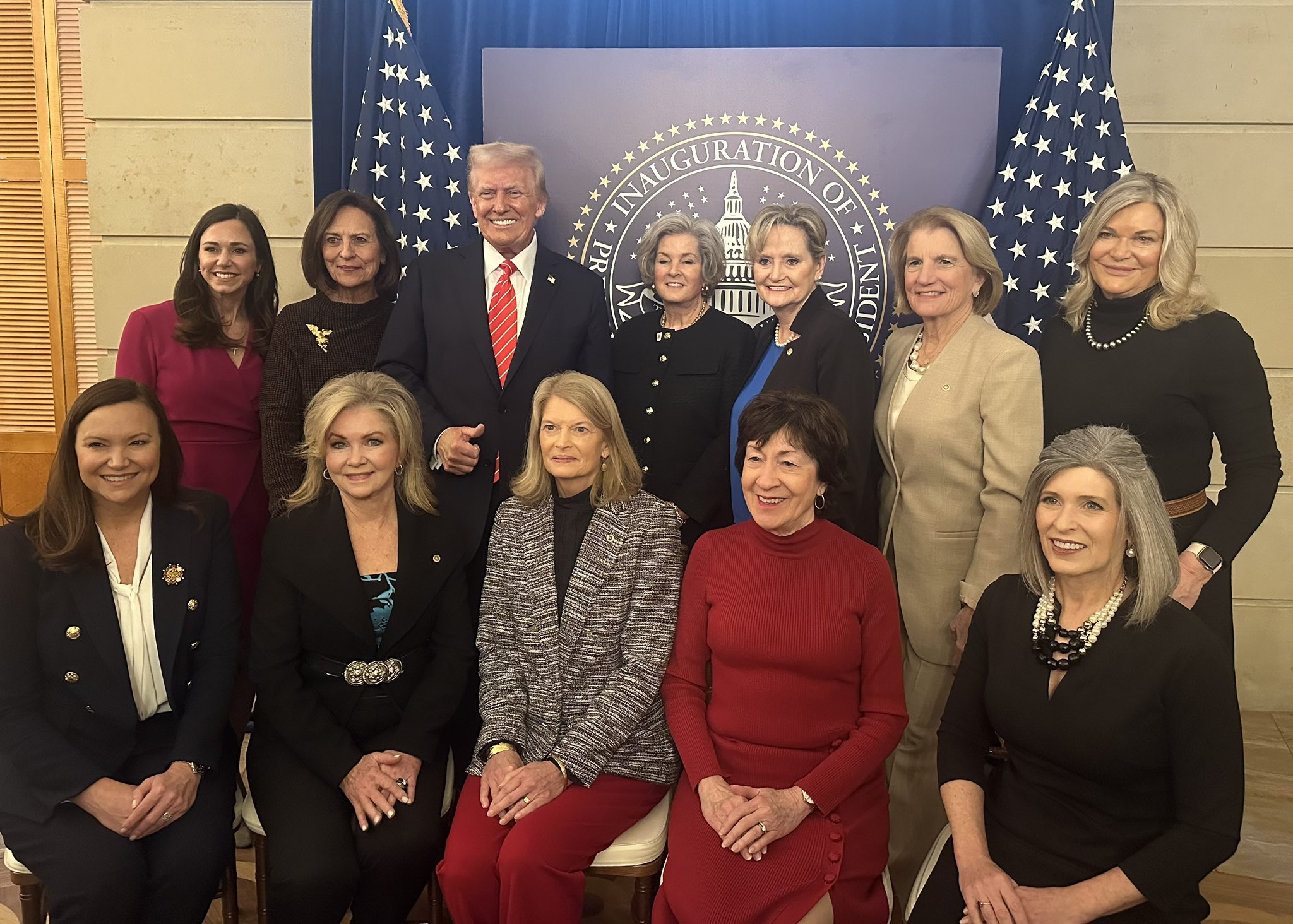
Collins with President Donald Trump, Susie Wiles, and fellow female Republican senators, January 2025

Collins's committee assignments for the 119th Congress are as follows:

- Committee on Appropriations (chair)
  - In addition to the below, as chair, Collins is an ex officio member of all subcommittees.
  - Subcommittee on Agriculture, Rural Development, Food and Drug Administration, and Related Agencies
  - Subcommittee on Commerce, Justice, Science, and Related Agencies
  - Subcommittee on Defense
  - Subcommittee on Military Construction, Veterans Affairs, and Related Agencies
  - Subcommittee on Transportation, Housing and Urban Development, and Related Agencies
- Committee on Health, Education, Labor, and Pensions
  - Subcommittee on Primary Health and Retirement Security
- Select Committee on Intelligence

=== Caucus memberships ===
- Afterschool Caucuses
- Republican Main Street Partnership
- Congressional Coalition on Adoption
- Senate Taiwan Caucus

== Political positions ==
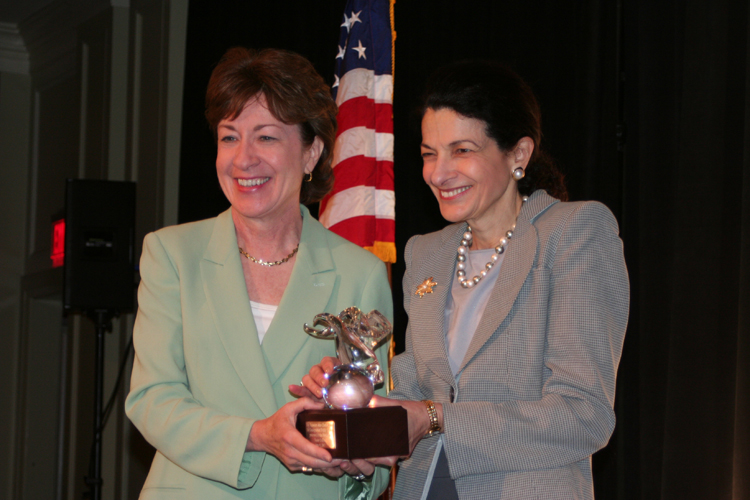
With former U.S. Senator Olympia Snowe (R-ME), November 2010

Collins has been described as a moderate Republican and a centrist, having voted with her party 59% of the time from 1997 to 2016. She voted with her party more often, about 87% of the time, in 2017, at the beginning of the Trump administration.

In 2013, Collins sided with Obama's position 75.9% of the time, one of only two Republicans to vote with him more than 70% of the time. As of January 2021, according to FiveThirtyEight, she had voted with Trump's positions about 65% of the time, the lowest among all Republican senators. During Trump's presidency she voted with the Republican majority on party-line votes much more often than during Obama's presidency. According to FiveThirtyEight, as of January 2023, she had voted with Biden's position about 67% of the time.

Collins voted to acquit Trump of all charges at his first impeachment trial. She said she did not think Trump's request that the Ukrainian President announce an investigation into Joe Biden met the "high bar" for "removing a duly elected president". She said Trump had "learned from this case" and "will be much more cautious in the future." Shortly after his acquittal, Trump fired witnesses in the impeachment inquiry. In the following months, he fired inspectors general of the State Department and the intelligence community. Collins criticized the firing, provoking a retaliatory response from Trump.

On February 13, 2021, Collins was one of the seven Republican senators who voted to convict Trump in his second impeachment trial. On May 27, 2021, along with five other Republicans and all present Democrats, she voted to establish a bipartisan commission to investigate the Capitol attack. She had amended the bill in the hopes of drawing sufficient Republicans to support it, but the vote failed for lack of 60 required "yes" votes to prevent a filibuster.

In 2023, the Lugar Center ranked Collins first among senators for bipartisanship. According to Govtrack, Collins's voting record in the 118th Congress (2023-2025) was less conservative than 48 other Republican senators, and more conservative than no Republican senators.

=== Abortion ===
In a May 1997 interview, Collins said she supported a proposal by Tom Daschle to ban all abortions after the fetus is capable of living outside the womb except to save the life of the woman or protect her from physical injury. Of an alternative measure proposed by Rick Santorum that would ban partial-birth abortion, Collins said it "ignores cases in the medical literature involving women with very serious physical health problems".

Collins is one of two Republican U.S. Senators, along with Lisa Murkowski, who describe themselves as pro-choice, or pro-abortion rights, and supported Roe v. Wade.

According to HuffPost, Collins has repeatedly voted to confirm judges who have signaled opposition to abortion rights. She has defended these votes by citing her support for both of Obama's Supreme Court appointments. She voted to confirm Brett Kavanaugh to the U.S. Supreme Court, saying she did not believe he would overturn Roe. She said she felt "vindication" in 2018 when Kavanaugh voted with the court's four Democratic-appointed justices and Chief Justice John Roberts not to hear cases against Planned Parenthood from Kansas and Louisiana, although Planned Parenthood disagreed with her assessment of the situation. In 2020, Collins faced renewed criticism of her vote by progressive groups when Kavanaugh said states should be permitted to severely reduce access to and availability of abortion in his dissent in June Medical Services LLC v Russo.

In 2021, Collins was one of three Republican senators to decline to sign an amicus brief supporting an anti-abortion Mississippi law banning abortion after 15 weeks of pregnancy. She faced renewed criticism after Kavanaugh voted with the majority, in a 5–4 vote, to reject an emergency petition to block a Texas law banning abortion after six weeks of pregnancy; the law went into effect while facing continued challenges in the courts. Responding to the legislation and criticism, Collins denounced the Texas anti-abortion law as "extreme, inhumane, and unconstitutional" and said she supports the Roe precedent as the "law of the land".

In 2022, Collins received additional criticism for her support of Kavanaugh after a leaked draft of the Supreme Court opinion in Dobbs v. Jackson Women's Health Organization indicated the Court would overturn Roe v. Wade, with Kavanaugh breaking with his statements that Roe was "settled law". She called the police after protesters wrote a chalk message in front of her home due to her votes to confirm justices involved in the draft ruling. Police said the chalk message was non-threatening and did not constitute a crime.

On May 11, 2022, Collins voted against the Women's Health Protection Act of 2022, a bill that would prohibit a variety of restrictions on access to abortion, on the basis that it went too far beyond the standards established in Roe v. Wade and Planned Parenthood v. Casey. Collins joined Murkowski and Senator Kyrsten Sinema in drafting the Reproductive Choice Act, alternative legislation that would codify Roe and Casey into federal law more narrowly.

=== Economy ===
In 2004, Collins expressed concerns about how the Bush administration wanted to implement its proposed plan to cut taxes. She cited deficit concerns as a reason for opposing the plan, but ultimately voted in favor of the Bush tax cuts in 2003 and for their extension in 2006. Collins was one of just three Republican lawmakers to vote for the American Recovery and Reinvestment Act, prompting heated criticism from the right for crossing party lines.

In December 2017, Collins voted to pass the 2017 Republican tax plan. The bill greatly reduces corporate taxes while reducing taxes for some individuals and increasing them for others by removing some popular deductions. The bill also repeals Affordable Care Act's individual mandate, leaving thirteen million Americans uninsured and raising premiums by an estimated additional 10% per year. After the vote, Collins said she received assurances from congressional leaders that they would pass legislation intended to mitigate some of the adverse effects of the individual mandate's repeal. When asked how she could vote for a bill that would increase the deficit by an estimated $1 trillion (over ten years) after having railed against the deficit during the Obama administration, Collins insisted that it would not increase the deficit. She said she had been advised in this determination by economists Glenn Hubbard, Larry Lindsey, and Douglas Holtz-Eakin. Conservative columnist Jennifer Rubin wrote that Hubbard and Holtz-Eakin denied saying the plan would not increase the deficit.

After voting for the tax plan, Collins became the top recipient of political donations from private equity firms. Blackstone chief executive Stephen A. Schwarzman donated $2 million to Collins's PAC, and Kenneth C. Griffin of the hedge fund Citadel donated $1.5 million.

Along with all other Senate and House Republicans, Collins voted against the American Rescue Plan Act of 2021. On September 30, 2021, she was one of 15 Senate Republicans to join all Democrats and both Independents to approve a temporary spending bill to continue government funding and avoid a government shutdown. On October 7, 2021, she voted with 10 other Republicans and all members of the Democratic caucus to break the filibuster on raising the debt ceiling. She voted with all Republicans against the legislation to raise the debt ceiling.

=== Environment ===
In 2008, Collins joined the bipartisan Gang of 20, which sought to break a deadlock on a bill allowing offshore drilling that would devote billions in proceeds to renewable energy development.

In February 2017, Collins was the only Republican to vote against undoing an Obama administration rule that required coal mining companies to avoid contaminating local waterways. She was the only Republican to vote against the confirmation of Scott Pruitt, and later Andrew Wheeler, to lead the Environmental Protection Agency. That same year, Collins voted for the Tax Cuts and Jobs Act, allowing oil drilling in the Arctic National Wildlife Refuge after unsuccessfully attempting to remove that part of the bill.

As of 2022, Collins has a lifetime score of 60% from the League of Conservation Voters, the highest of any incumbent Senate Republican.

=== Foreign policy and national security ===
In 2002, Collins voted in favor of the Iraq War Resolution authorizing President Bush to go to war against Iraq. In November 2007, she was one of four Republicans to vote for a Democratic proposal of $50 billion that would condition further spending on a timeline for withdrawing troops, mandating that a withdrawal begin 30 days after the bill was enacted as part of a goal of removing all U.S. troops in Iraq by December 15, 2008. The bill failed to get the 60 votes needed to overcome a filibuster. In April 2008, Collins and Senators Ben Nelson and Evan Bayh met with Bush's advisor on Iraq and Afghanistan, Douglas Lute, and expressed support for a prohibition on spending for major reconstruction projects, the proposal requiring Iraqis to pay for its security forces to be trained and equipped and reimburse the American military for the estimated $153 million a month the military spent on fueling in combat operations in Iraq. Collins said after the meeting that while the administration did not have a view entirely similar to the senators', it at least seemed open to their proposal. In June 2014, while growing violence erupted in Iraq under the leadership of Prime Minister Nouri al-Maliki, Collins said the violence would have been slower had a residual NATO force been present in Iraq and that the question was whether airstrikes were effective.

In September 2009, Collins said she was unsure whether sending more American troops to Afghanistan would help end the Afghanistan War, but cited the need for "more American civilians to help build up institutions" and growth of the Afghan army. In 2010, she called for the removal of Arnold Fields as Special Inspector General for Afghanistan Reconstruction, citing his repeated expressing of concern for the SIGAR and his disappointment with the Obama administration's "ongoing failure to take decisive action". In August 2017, Collins commended Trump for providing clarity after years of the U.S. lacking a "clear focus and defined strategy" with respect to Afghanistan and said he made the case that the Afghan government must participate "in defending its people, ending havens for terrorists, and curtailing corruption".

Before Obama met President of China Xi Jinping at an informal retreat in June 2013, Collins co-sponsored legislation to authorize the Commerce Department to investigate whether currency manipulation is a form of subsidization. In April 2018, she said the U.S. needed "a more nuanced approach" in dealing with China but gave Trump "credit for levying these tariffs against the Chinese, with whom we've talked for a decade about their unfair trade practices and their theft of intellectual property from American firms", adding that while the U.S. needed to toughen its stance against China, it would need to do this in a manner that did not create "a trade war and retaliation that will end up with our European and Asian competitors getting business that otherwise would have come to American farmers".

In March 2015, Collins was one of seven Senate Republicans not to sign a March 2015 letter to the leadership of the Islamic Republic of Iran attempting to cast doubt on the Obama administration's authority to engage in nuclear-proliferation negotiations with Iran. She announced her opposition to the Iran nuclear agreement later that year, saying it was "fundamentally flawed because it leaves Iran as capable of building a nuclear weapon at the expiration of the agreement as it is today", and predicted Iran "will be a more dangerous and stronger nuclear threshold state" after the agreement expires. In June 2019, after the United States nearly launched an airstrike on Iran after Iran downed an American surveillance drone, Collins said the U.S. could not "allow Iran to continue to launch this kind of attack" but warned that miscalculations by either side "could lead to a war in the Middle East".

In March 2017, Collins co-sponsored the Israel Anti-Boycott Act (S.270), which made it a federal crime, punishable by a maximum sentence of 20 years imprisonment, for Americans to encourage or participate in boycotts against Israel and Israeli settlements in the occupied Palestinian territories if protesting actions by the Israeli government.

In March 2018, Collins was one of five Republican senators to vote against tabling a resolution that would cease the U.S. military's support for the Saudi Arabian-led intervention in Yemen. In December, she was one of seven Republican senators to vote for the resolution withdrawing American armed forces' support for the Saudi-led coalition in Yemen and an amendment by Todd Young ensuring midair refueling between American and Saudi Air Force did not resume. Collins was one of seven Republicans to vote to end U.S. support for the war in Yemen in February 2019, and, in May 2019, she was one of seven Republicans to vote to override Trump's veto of the resolution on Yemen. In June 2019, Collins was one of seven Republicans to vote to block Trump's Saudi arms deal providing weapons to Saudi Arabia, United Arab Emirates, and Jordan and one of five Republicans to vote against an additional 20 arms sales.

In May 2020, Collins voted to confirm U.S. Representative John Ratcliffe as Director of National Intelligence. In 2019, there was bipartisan opposition to Ratcliffe's nomination. The Washington Post called Collins's support for Ratcliffe "key" to his 2020 confirmation.

Collins said she was "saddened" by Trump's White House clash with Ukrainian President Volodymyr Zelenskyy on February 28, 2025.

After the second Trump administration launched the 2026 Iran war, Collins initially voted against multiple Democratic-led resolutions to require congressional approval. She changed her position in late April 2026, citing the 60-day deadline under the War Powers Act of 1973, and voted with Democrats to end military hostilities unless Congress authorized their continuation. In May 2026 she voted to advance a war powers resolution requiring congressional approval for further operations.

The 2025–2026 Canada–United States trade war was a major issue of Collins's 2026 campaign. Trump announced exemptions for some Canadian products used in Maine industry. Collins said she was responsible for negotiating the exemptions.

=== Gun policy ===
Collins voted for the Manchin–Toomey bill to amend federal law to expand background checks for gun purchases. She voted against a ban on high-capacity (more than ten rounds) magazines. In 2014 she received a "C" grade on gun rights from the NRA Political Victory Fund, rising to a "B" rating in 2020. She received a D− from Gun Owners of America in 2012.

In 2018, Collins co-sponsored the NICS Denial Notification Act, legislation developed in the aftermath of the Stoneman Douglas High School shooting that would require federal authorities to inform states within a day after a person failing the National Instant Criminal Background Check System attempted to buy a firearm.

In February 2019, Collins supported the Terrorist Firearms Prevention Act, legislation enabling the attorney general to deny the sale of a firearm to people on the no-fly list or selectee list. It passed the House but failed to advance in the Senate.

In 2022, Collins became one of ten Republican senators to support a bipartisan agreement on gun control, which included a red flag provision, a support for state crisis intervention orders, funding for school safety resources, stronger background checks for buyers under the age of 21, and penalties for straw purchases.

=== Health care ===
In May 2017, Collins was one of six senators to introduce the Medicaid Coverage for Addiction Recovery Expansion Act, legislation that would allow treatment facilities with up to 40 beds reimbursement by Medicaid for 60 consecutive days of inpatient services and serve as a modification of the Medicaid Institutions for Mental Disease law, which authorized Medicaid coverage for only those facilities with 16 or fewer beds.

Though she voted against the Affordable Care Act (Obamacare), Collins (along with fellow Republicans John McCain and Lisa Murkowski) voted against an unsuccessful "skinny repeal" attempt in July 2017. Later that year, she voted with Republican senators to repeal the individual mandate of the ACA. The absence of the individual mandate weakened the ACA's legal stability, leading the Trump administration in 2020 to seek to have the ACA ruled unconstitutional by the courts (in a 5–4 Supreme Court decision in 2012, Chief Justice Roberts upheld the ACA by citing the individual mandate). The ACA remained intact, despite the lack of the individual mandate, following a 7-2 Supreme Court decision to reject a challenge to the law.

In December 2017, Collins was one of nine senators to sign a letter to Senate Majority Leader Mitch McConnell and Minority Leader Chuck Schumer describing opioid use as a nonpartisan issue that was "ravaging communities in every state and preys upon individuals and families regardless of party affiliation" and requesting that they "make every effort to ensure that new, substantial and sustained funding for the opioid epidemic is included in any legislative package".

In April 2019, Collins cosponsored the Protecting Jessica Grubb's Legacy Act, legislation that authorized the sharing of the medical records of patients being treated for substance use disorder among healthcare providers if the patient provided the information. Cosponsor Shelley Moore Capito said the bill also prevented medical providers from unintentionally providing opioids to individuals in recovery.

=== Immigration ===
In 2007, Collins voted against the bipartisan McCain-Kennedy comprehensive immigration reform proposal, which would have given undocumented immigrants (including those brought into the United States as minors) a pathway to citizenship if they met certain requirements, while also substantially increasing border enforcement. In 2010, she voted against the DREAM Act. In 2013, Collins was one of 14 Republicans to vote in favor of a comprehensive immigration bill that included border security and a pathway to citizenship for undocumented immigrants. She opposed Obama's decision to achieve immigration reform through executive action, which gave deportation relief to as many as five million undocumented immigrants through Deferred Action for Childhood Arrivals (DACA).

In 2017, Collins opposed Trump's executive order to ban entry to the U.S. by citizens of seven Muslim-majority countries, saying, "The worldwide refugee ban set forth in the executive order is overly broad and implementing it will be immediately problematic." In 2019, she introduced bipartisan legislation to oppose Trump's declaration emergency at the southern border in order to build a wall. She was one of a dozen Republicans who broke with their party, joining all Democrats, to vote for the resolution rejecting the emergency declaration. In September 2019, she again voted with 10 other Republicans to overturn Trump's emergency declaration on the border.

=== Animal welfare ===
In 2023, Collins was a signatory to a letter opposing the inclusion of the Ending Agricultural Trade Suppression (EATS) Act in the Farm Bill, leading to praise from animal welfare advocates. The EATS act would have overturned state-level animal protection laws in agriculture.

=== LGBTQ policy ===
In 2004, Collins was one of six Republicans who voted against the Federal Marriage Amendment, a proposed amendment to the U.S. Constitution that would ban same-sex marriage. She voted in favor of the Don't Ask, Don't Tell Repeal Act of 2010 and was the primary Republican sponsor of the repeal effort. In 2015, she was one of 11 Republican senators to vote to give Social Security benefits to same-sex couples in states where same-sex marriage was not yet recognized.

In 2017, Collins voted to confirm Steven Grasz, a board member for the Nebraska Family Alliance (NFA), as a federal judge. Maine Public reported the NFA opposes LGBT anti-discrimination protections, and "has supported conversion therapy for LGBT minors." The American Bar Association (ABA) said Grasz was unqualified. Collins was criticized for her vote. The ABA said Grasz's views on LGBT and abortion were not in themselves at issue, but were too strong for him to judge related cases impartially. Collins disagreed and said the ABA's review had been unfair. After she met Grasz, Collins said, "I did not find any evidence at all to indicate that he would be prejudiced in his rulings or that he would not follow precedent."

In 2017 and 2019, Collins co-sponsored bills with Democratic senators to prevent Trump from banning transgender people from the United States military and prohibit anti-LGBT housing discrimination. She was the only Republican co-sponsor of the Equality Act, which aims to comprehensively prohibit LGBT discrimination. In February 2021, Collins announced she would no longer co-sponsor the bill over amendments that were not made.

In 2021, Collins was one of 49 senators to vote for an amendment to the American Rescue Plan Act of 2021, which aimed to defund schools allowing transgender students to compete in sports. In 2025, she signed a referendum petition for her state that would bar transgender students from girls' sports teams and from using women's changing rooms and bathrooms.

The Human Rights Campaign (HRC), which rates politicians' support for LGBT issues, gave Collins a score of 85% during the 114th Congress (2015–17), and a score of 33% during the 115th Congress (2017–19). She received a 49% score in the 116th Congress. In 2020, the HRC endorsed an opponent of Collins for the first time since 1996, citing her votes for judicial nominees, particularly Brett Kavanaugh. In 2022, Collins was one of 12 Republicans in the Senate voting to advance and pass the Respect for Marriage Act, legislation intended to codify same-sex marriage rights into federal law.

=== Net neutrality ===
Collins strongly supports FCC Open Internet Order 2010. After former Federal Communications Commission chairman Ajit Pai repealed net neutrality regulations in 2017, Collins and Senator Angus King announced they would support a bipartisan enactment of the Congressional Review Act to reverse the FCC's decision. In another statement, Collins argued that net neutrality regulations would help rural communities obtain access to the internet and that the regulations strengthened consumer privacy protections, citing the Facebook–Cambridge Analytica data scandal for failing to protect consumers' privacy.

=== United States Postal Service ===
In 2006, Collins sponsored the Postal Accountability and Enhancement Act, which passed the Senate unanimously. It requires the USPS to prepay 50 years' worth of employee health and retirement benefits.

== Honors and awards ==
The United States Chamber of Commerce awarded Collins the 2013 Spirit of Enterprise Award for her support of its positions.

On May 7, 2014, The National Journal recognized Collins as the senator with "perfect attendance", noting that she had not missed a single vote since her election to the Senate in 1997.

In 2014, Elle magazine named Collins one of its "10 Most Powerful Women in D.C."

Collins received the Publius Award from the Center for the Study of the Presidency and Congress on March 12, 2014.

The Veterans of Foreign Wars gave Collins its 2017 Congressional Award, which is annually given to one member of Congress for their significant legislative contributions on behalf of military veterans.

In 2022, Collins received the Academy of Achievement's Golden Plate Award.

In December 2024, Susan Collins was included on the BBC's 100 Women list.

== Honorary degrees ==
Honorary degrees awarded to Susan Collins
School	Location	Date	Degree	Gave commencement address
Husson University	Bangor, Maine	1997	Doctor of Public Service	No
University of New England	Biddeford, Maine	1999	Doctor of Laws (LL.D.)	Yes
Maine Maritime Academy	Castine, Maine	2007	Doctorate	Yes
Colby College	Waterville, Maine	September 13, 2014	Doctorate	No
University of Maine at Augusta	Augusta, Maine	May 9, 2015	Doctor of Humane Letters (DHL)	Yes
Middlebury College	Middlebury, Vermont	May 29, 2016	Doctorate	No
St. Lawrence University	Canton, New York	May 21, 2017	Doctor of Humane Letters (DHL)	Yes
Bates College	Lewiston, Maine	May 28, 2017	Doctor of Humane Letters (DHL)	No

== Personal life ==
Collins is married to Thomas Daffron, a lobbyist who worked as chief operating officer at Jefferson Consulting Group in Washington, D.C., from 2006 to 2016; he consulted on Collins's 1996, 2002 and 2008 Senate campaigns. Daffron and Collins married on August 11, 2012, at the Gray Memorial United Methodist Church in Caribou, Maine. Collins is Catholic.

In 2026, Collins said that she had been diagnosed with a benign essential tremor that did not interfere with her ability to serve in Washington.

== Electoral history ==
=== 1994 ===
1994 Maine gubernatorial Republican primary
Party	Candidate	Votes	%
Republican	Susan Collins	19,133	21.35%
Republican	Sumner Lipman	15,214	16.98%
Republican	Jasper Wyman	14,335	15.99%
Republican	Judith Foss	11,734	13.09%
Republican	Paul R. Young	10,088	11.26%
Republican	Mary Adams	7,678	8.57%
Republican	Charles Webster	6,220	6.94%
Republican	Pamela Cahill	5,154	5.75%
Write-in		67	0.07%
Total votes		89,623	100%

1994 Maine gubernatorial general election
Party	Candidate	Votes	%
Independent	Angus King	180,829	35.37%
Democratic	Joseph Brennan	172,951	33.83%
Republican	Susan Collins	117,990	23.08%
Green	Jonathan Carter	32,695	6.39%
Write-in	Ed Finks	6,576	1.29%
Write-in		267	0.05%
Total votes		511,308	100%
Independent gain from Republican			

=== 1996 ===
1996 United States Senate election in Maine, Republican primary
Party	Candidate	Votes	%
Republican	Susan Collins	53,339	55.50%
Republican	W. John Hathaway	29,792	31.00%
Republican	Robert A. G. Monks	12,943	13.47%
Write-in		33	0.03%
Total votes		96,107	100%

1996 United States Senate election in Maine, general election
Party	Candidate	Votes	%
Republican	Susan Collins	298,422	49.18%
Democratic	Joseph Brennan	266,226	43.88%
Green	John Rensenbrink	23,441	3.86%
Constitution	William P. Clarke	18,618	3.07%
Write-in		70	0.01%
Total votes		606,777	100%
Republican hold			

=== 2002 ===
2002 United States Senate election in Maine, Republican primary
Party	Candidate	Votes	%
Republican	Susan Collins (incumbent)	74,643	100.00%
Total votes		74,643	100%

2002 United States Senate election in Maine, general election
Party	Candidate	Votes	%
Republican	Susan Collins (incumbent)	295,041	58.44%
Democratic	Chellie Pingree	209,858	41.56%
Total votes		504,899	100%
Republican hold			

=== 2008 ===
2008 United States Senate election in Maine, Republican primary
Party	Candidate	Votes	%
Republican	Susan Collins (incumbent)	56,304	99.97%
Write-in		19	0.03%
Total votes		56,323	100%

2008 United States Senate election in Maine, general election
Party	Candidate	Votes	%
Republican	Susan Collins (incumbent)	444,300	61.33%
Democratic	Tom Allen	279,510	38.58%
Write-in		620	0.09%
Total votes		724,430	100%
Republican hold			

=== 2014 ===
2014 United States Senate election in Maine, Republican primary
Party	Candidate	Votes	%
Republican	Susan Collins (incumbent)	59,767	100.00%
Total votes		59,767	100%

2014 United States Senate election in Maine, general election
Party	Candidate	Votes	%
Republican	Susan Collins (incumbent)	413,495	68.46%
Democratic	Shenna Bellows	190,244	31.50%
Write-in		269	0.04%
Total votes		604,008	100%
Republican hold			

=== 2020 ===
2020 United States Senate election in Maine, Republican primary
Party	Candidate	Votes	%
Republican	Susan Collins (incumbent)	87,375	98.79%
Write-in	Amy Colter	1,073	1.21%
Total votes		88,448	100.0%

2020 United States Senate election in Maine, general election
Party	Candidate	Votes	%
Republican	Susan Collins (incumbent)	417,645	50.98%
Democratic	Sara Gideon	347,223	42.39%
Independent	Lisa Savage	40,579	4.95%
Independent	Max Linn	13,508	1.65%
Write-in		228	0.03%
Total votes		819,183	100.0%
Republican hold			

== See also ==
- Women in the United States Senate

Party political offices
Preceded by Jock McKernan	Republican nominee for Governor of Maine; 1994	Succeeded by Jim Longley
Preceded by Bill Cohen	Republican nominee for U.S. Senator from Maine (Class 2); 1996, 2002, 2008, 2014, 2020, 2026	Most recent
Preceded by Jennifer Dunn; Steve Largent	Response to the State of the Union address 2000; Served alongside: Bill Frist	Succeeded by Tom Daschle; Dick Gephardt
U.S. Senate
Preceded by Bill Cohen	U.S. Senator (Class 2) from Maine; 1997–present Served alongside: Olympia Snowe, Angus King	Incumbent
Preceded by Joe Lieberman	Chair of the Senate Homeland Security Committee; 2003–2007	Succeeded by Joe Lieberman
Preceded by Joe Lieberman	Ranking Member of the Senate Homeland Security Committee; 2007–2013	Succeeded by Tom Coburn
Preceded by Bob Corker	Ranking Member of the Senate Aging Committee; 2013–2015	Succeeded by Claire McCaskill
Preceded by Bill Nelson	Chair of the Senate Aging Committee; 2015–2021	Succeeded by Bob Casey Jr.
Preceded by Richard Shelby	Ranking Member of the Senate Appropriations Committee; 2023–2025	Succeeded by Patty Murray
Preceded by Patty Murray	Chair of the Senate Appropriations Committee; 2025–present	Incumbent
U.S. order of precedence (ceremonial)
Preceded by Jack Reed	Order of precedence of the United States as United States Senator	Succeeded by Mike Crapo
Preceded by Jack Reed	United States senators by seniority 7th	Succeeded by Chuck Schumer
