= Leo Kieffer =

American politician

R. Leo Kieffer

Member of the Maine Senate from the 2nd district
- In office 1992–2000
- Preceded by: Donald Collins
- Succeeded by: Richard Kneeland

Personal details
- Born: September 11, 1930 Mauston, Wisconsin
- Died: August 12, 2017 (aged 86) Bangor, Maine
- Party: Republican
- Spouse: Mary Patricia Hoye

Robert Leo Kieffer (September 11, 1930 – August 12, 2017) was an American businessperson and politician from Maine. Kieffer, a Republican, served in the Maine State Senate from 1992 to 2000, representing his residence in Caribou, Maine as well as much of Aroostook County. He replaced fellow Republican Donald Collins, who did not seek re-election. Prior to serving in the State Senate, Kieffer served five years on the Caribou Town Council, including a stint as mayor (1991-1992). In February 1997, Kieffer was named legislator of the year by the Economic Development Council of Maine. From 1996 to 1998, Kieffer served as Assistant Senate Minority Leader.

Kieffer was born in Mauston, Wisconsin, served in the United States Army, and graduated from Madison College.
