= Richard Barringer =

American politician and writer (1937–2025)

Richard Edward Barringer (November 21, 1937 – October 20, 2025) was an American politician and writer from Maine. Barringer served as Director of Public Lands in Maine from 1973 to 1975, when he was appointed Conservation Commissioner. In 1994, Barringer ran for Governor of Maine as a Democrat, finishing in third place in the primary. He is the author of The Maine Manifest and Changes.

== Life and career ==
Barringer was born on November 21, 1937, and grew up in the Charlestown neighborhood of Boston, Massachusetts. He attended Harvard University. He enlisted in the United States Coast Guard and was on both active and reserve duty from 1959 to 1967 mostly serving in Latin America. He earned a Ph.D. in political science and economics from the Massachusetts Institute of Technology and subsequently taught at Harvard.

Barringer died on October 20, 2025, at the age of 87.
