= Samuel Collins (Maine politician) =

American judge & politician (1923–2012)

Samuel Collins Jr.

Associate Justice of the Maine Supreme Court
- In office September 16, 1988 – March 15, 1994

Member of the Maine Senate
- In office 1974–1984

Personal details
- Born: Samuel Wilson Collins; September 17, 1923 Caribou, Maine, U.S.
- Died: March 22, 2012 (aged 88) Rockland, Maine, U.S.
- Party: Republican
- Spouse: Dorothy Collins
- Relations: Donald Collins (brother); Susan Collins (niece)
- Education: University of Maine; Harvard Law School
- Profession: Attorney

Samuel Wilson Collins Jr. (September 17, 1923 – March 22, 2012) was an American lawyer, jurist and politician from Maine. A Republican, Collins was first elected to the Maine Senate in 1974. He served for 10 years until 1984, when he did not seek re-election. Collins served for six years (1988 to 1994) as an associate justice of the Maine Supreme Judicial Court. He also served on his local school board from 1952 to 1960.

Collins chose to return to Maine following law school graduation and took a position with Alan Bird's law firm in Rockland, where he was later named a managing partner. The law firm was later renamed Collins, Crandall, Hanscom and Pease.

A Republican, Collins served in the state senate with his brother, Donald Collins of Caribou. Collins' tenure included terms as the state senate's majority leader.

== Personal ==
Collins was born and raised in Caribou, Maine and worked as a youth on a potato farm. He was the oldest of four sons to Samuel Wilson Collins and Elizabeth Black Collins. Collins graduated from Caribou High School and attended the University of Maine. He graduated in three years and worked during World War II in the War Department in Arlington, Virginia doing army intelligence work.

After the war ended, Collins attended and graduated from Harvard Law School in 1947. An active Unitarian-Universalist, Collins served as president of the Universalist Churches of Maine and president of the Northeast District of the Universalist/Unitarian Association. He was the uncle of the U.S. Senator of Maine Susan Collins.
