= Richard Cebra =

American politician (born 1964)

Richard M. Cebra
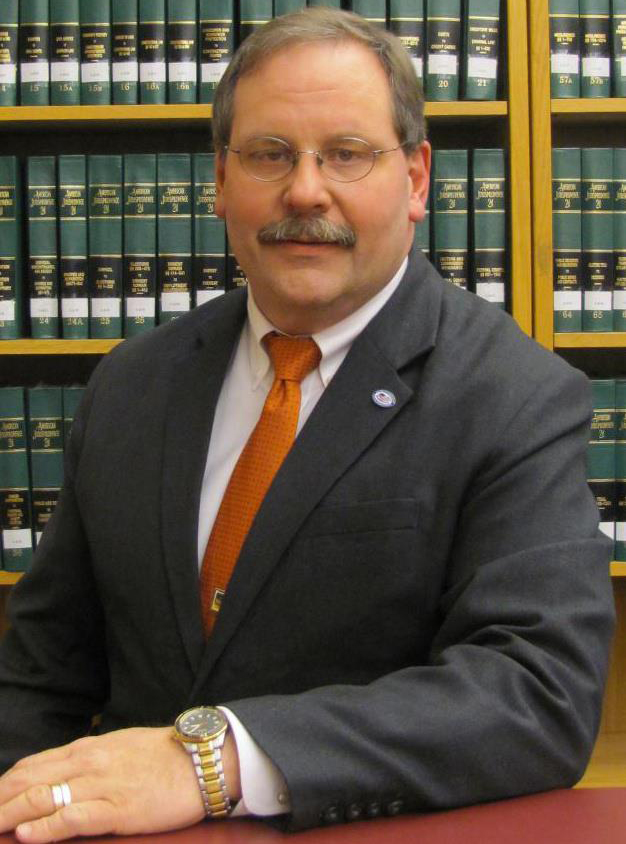

Member of the Maine House of Representatives from the 68th district
- In office December 7, 2016 – December 7, 2022
- Preceded by: Christine Powers
- Succeeded by: Amanda Collamore

Chairman of the Maine Republican Party
- In office December 1, 2012 – July 3, 2013
- Preceded by: Charlie Webster
- Succeeded by: Rick Bennett

Member of the Maine House of Representatives from the 101st district
- In office December 2004 – December 2012
- Preceded by: Phillip Cressey
- Succeeded by: Christine Powers

Personal details
- Born: May 18, 1964 (age 62) Passaic, New Jersey
- Party: Republican
- Spouse: Philippa Cebra

Richard M. Cebra (born May 18, 1964) is an American politician from Maine. A Republican, he represented Maine House of Representatives District 101, which included Casco, Naples and part of Poland from 2004 to 2012. He was elected to the 128th Legislature in November 2016 serving district House District 68, which includes the towns of Naples, Sebago, Baldwin, Cornish and part of Parsonfield. Following his initial departure from the legislature in 2012, he served as chairman of the Maine Republican Party, from which he stepped down in 2013. Cebra represented District 68 until 2022. Cebra is known as a social and fiscal conservative, and was a close ally of Governor Paul LePage.

== Early life and education ==
Cebra graduated from the Eastern Christian High School in North Haledon, New Jersey, in 1982. He studies theology at Liberty University in Lynchburg, Virginia.

== Personal life ==
Cebra has been married to his wife Philippa since 1991. He has two adult children, and three grandsons.

Cebra had previously served on the Naples Budget Committee for five years. He is a founding member of Naples Main Street and the Naples Causeway Restoration Committee. Cebra is currently a selectman, assessor and overseer of the poor in the Town of Naples, and also serves as a commissioner on the Naples Casco Bulky Waste Facility Board.

== Business experience ==
Cebra began as a self-employed project manager and systems technician in the professional video and trade show field.

In 1995, he became the Operations Manager, MSI Communications, Inc., an ESOP computer networking company.

In 2001, he became the owner of Steamboat Landing, a tourism based business which includes a mini-golf course in Naples.

== Maine House of Representatives ==
In November 2004, Cebra was elected to represent the 101st House District in the Maine State Legislature. He was re-elected in 2006, 2008, 2010.

In November 2016 was elected to represent house District 68, the Towns of Naples, Sebago, Baldwin, Cornish and part of Parsonsfield.

In the Maine House of Representatives, Cebra has served on the Joint Standing Committee on Inland Fisheries and Wildlife (1 term), The Joint Standing Committee on State and Local Government (1 term), The Joint standing Committee on Transportation (4 terms, 2 years as House Chairman), The House Committee on Ethics (chairman) (1 term), and the Joint Select Committee on Joint Rules (1 term).

Cebra was appointed to the commission to Reapportion Maine's Congressional Districts in 2011.

== Time in Legislature ==
He worked with members of both parties to pass LD 2313 "An Act to Keep Maine Bridges Safe" in 2008.

He sponsored and lead the efforts on the Turnpike Reform Bill which was passed into law to reform the Maine Turnpike Authority.

He sponsored a successful bill that banned traffic enforcement cameras in Maine.

He cosponsored and helped craft a compromise bill to bring Maine into compliance with the Federal Real ID program.

== Chairman of the Maine Republican Party ==
Following the resignation of the previous chairman of the Maine Republican Party, Charlie Webster, Cebra submitted his name for election as the new chairman. Following a meeting of the party leadership in Augusta, Maine in December 2012, he was elected to serve as party chairman.

After his election, Cebra stated that his goal was to "unify the party" following a series of well-publicized inter-party squabbles.

Cebra served as the Republican Chairman on the Statewide Redistricting Commission in 2013.

=== Resignation ===
Cebra resigned as chair of the Maine State Republican Party on July 3, 2013, citing "personal reasons".

According to Maine Republican Party bylaws, a new election was held on July 20, for the selection of a new chairman. Former Senate President Rick Bennett, was elected to replace Cebra.
