= Paryse Martin =

American-Canadian artist

- Born: Caribou, Maine, United States
- Education: Université Laval 1986 and 1994
- Alma mater: Université du Québec à Montréal 2007
- Known for: Painting; Sculpture; Drawing; Animation

Paryse Martin is an American-born Canadian artist. She works in multiple disciplines, including painting, sculpture, drawing, engraving and animation.

== Life and work ==
Paryse Martin was born in Caribou, Maine in the United States. In 1986, she completed her bachelor's degree in fine art from Université Laval, followed by her Master's of Fine Arts in 1994, again at Laval. Martin became a professor of fine art at Université Laval in 2000, where she continues to work today. In 2007, she completed PhD in art at the Université du Québec à Montréal.

== Notable collections ==
- L'Univers chiffonné, 2005, Musée national des beaux-arts du Québec
- Cultiver L'Imaginaiare, 2007, City of Montreal
