= Charlie Webster (politician) =

American politician

Charles M. Webster is an American politician from Maine. Webster, a Republican from Farmington, served 14 years in the Maine Legislature, including four in the Maine House of Representatives (1980–1984) and ten in the Maine Senate (1984–1994). In the Senate, Webster served one term (1986–1988) as Assistant Minority Leader and two terms (1988–1992) as Minority Leader.

In 1994, Webster sought the Republican nomination for Governor. Webster finished 7th of 8 candidates.

Webster was named Chair of the Maine Republican Party in 2008. He stepped down in December 2012 after the party lost control of both the House of Representatives and Senate in the November 2012 general election. He was replaced as chair by Richard Cebra, a former State Representative from Naples, Maine.

On August 10, 2015, Maine Governor Paul LePage appointed Webster to serve as a county commissioner for Franklin County's District 2, as an interim replacement for Commissioner Fred Hardy, who died on July 4 in the third year of his four-year term.

Maine House of Representatives
Preceded by Richard G. Morton	Member of the Maine House of Representatives from the 36th district 1980–1984	Succeeded by Ada K. Brown
Maine Senate
Preceded by Peter W. Danton	Member of the Maine Senate from the 4th district 1984–1994	Succeeded by Vinton Cassidy
Preceded by Thomas R. Perkins	Minority Leader of the Maine Senate; 1988–1992	Succeeded by Pamela Cahill
Party political offices
Preceded by Mark J. Ellis	Chairman of the Maine Republican Party; 2008–2012	Succeeded by Richard Cebra
