= 1994 Maine gubernatorial election =

- November 8, 1994
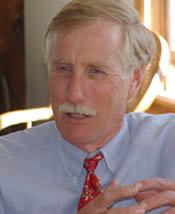

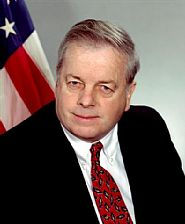

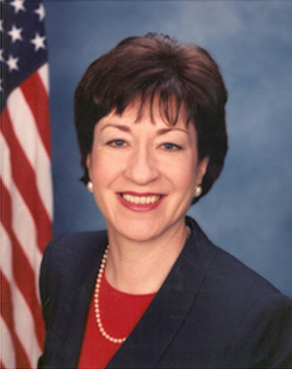

Nominee	Angus King	Joseph Brennan
Party	Independent	Democratic
Popular vote	180,829	172,951
Percentage	35.37%	33.83%
Nominee	Susan Collins	Jonathan Carter
Party	Republican	Green
Popular vote	117,990	32,695
Percentage	23.08%	6.39%
- King: 20–30% 30–40% 40–50% 50–60% 60–70% Brennan: 20–30% 30–40% 40–50% 50–60% 60–70% 70–80% Collins: 20–30% 30–40% 40–50% 50–60% 60–70% >90% Tie: 20–30% 30–40%
Governor before election
John R. McKernan, Jr.
Republican
Elected Governor
Angus King
Independent

The 1994 Maine gubernatorial election took place on November 8, 1994 to elect the governor of Maine. Incumbent Republican governor John McKernan was term-limited and could not seek re-election to a third consecutive term. Independent candidate Angus King won the election.

King defeated Democratic nominee Joseph Brennan, a former governor and congressman, Republican nominee Susan Collins, a regional coordinator of the Small Business Administration and the former Deputy Treasurer of Massachusetts, and Green nominee Jonathan Carter, an environmentalist activist. This was the first election since 1974 in which Maine elected an independent governor. Both King and Collins represented the state's delegation in the United States Senate from 2013 to 2027.

Carter's 6.4% of the vote allowed the Maine Green Independent Party to be recognized as a political party by the state.

== Republican primary ==
=== Candidates ===
==== Nominated ====
- Susan Collins, businesswoman and former Deputy Treasurer of Massachusetts

==== Eliminated in primary ====
- Mary Adams, tax activist
- Pamela Cahill, state representative
- Judith Foss, state representative
- Sumner Lipman, attorney and state representative
- Charlie Webster, state senator
- Jasper Wyman, leader of Maine Christian Civic League and businessman
- Paul R. Young, professor and state representative

=== Results ===
Republican primary results
Party	Candidate	Votes	%
Republican	Susan Collins	19,133	21.3
Republican	Sumner Lipman	15,214	17.0
Republican	Jasper Wyman	14,335	16.0
Republican	Judith Foss	11,734	13.1
Republican	Paul R. Young	10,088	11.3
Republican	Mary Adams	7,678	8.6
Republican	Charles Webster	6,220	6.9
Republican	Pamela Cahill	5,154	5.8
Total votes		89,623	100.0

== Democratic primary ==
=== Candidates ===
==== Nominated ====
- Joseph E. Brennan, former Governor and former U.S. Representative from the 1st congressional district

==== Eliminated in primary ====
- Tom Allen, former Mayor of Portland
- Richard Barringer, former Director of Public Lands in Maine
- Donnell Carroll, state representative
- Robert Woodbury, former president of the University of Southern Maine

==== Withdrawn ====
- James Howaniec, former Mayor of Lewiston (ran for U.S. House)

=== Results ===
Democratic primary results
Party	Candidate	Votes	%
Democratic	Joseph E. Brennan	56,359	56.2
Democratic	Tom Allen	23,881	23.8
Democratic	Dick Barringer	9,136	9.1
Democratic	Robert Woodbury	8,150	8.1
Democratic	Donnell Carroll	2,618	2.6
Total votes		100,144	100.0

== General election ==
Despite a crowded Democratic primary field, Brennan easily dispatched his challengers in the Democratic primary, winning over 56% of the primary vote. Collins triumphed in an even more crowded GOP field, taking 21% of the vote against seven other candidates. As a moderate, Collins was subjected to attacks from the right wing of the Republican Party, who claimed she was too liberal. She was also criticized for her residency; despite being a Maine native, she had lived and worked in Massachusetts and only returned to Maine shortly before launching her gubernatorial campaign with the support of Senator William Cohen. Her closest opponent had been Sumner Lipman, the preferred candidate of incumbent governor John R. McKernan Jr.

King made heavy use of campaign ads, including running them during the primary season despite not being subjected to a primary as an independent candidate. The state's two largest newspapers split their endorsements, with Brennan receiving the endorsement of the Portland Press Herald and Collins the Bangor Daily News, while the Sportsman's Alliance of Maine, a gun group, endorsed King.

=== Candidates ===
- Angus King (Independent), lawyer and public television host
- Joseph Brennan (Democratic), former governor and U.S. Representative from the 1st congressional district
- Susan Collins (Republican), businesswoman
- Jonathan Carter (Green), environmentalist and scientist

=== Results ===
County Flips: Independent Flip / Republican Hold / Democratic Hold Flip

1994 Maine gubernatorial election
Party	Candidate	Votes	%
Independent	Angus King	180,829	35.37%
Democratic	Joseph Brennan	172,951	33.83%
Republican	Susan Collins	117,990	23.08%
Green	Jonathan Carter	32,695	6.39%
Write-in	Write-ins	6,843	1.34%
Total votes		511,308	100.00%
Independent gain from Republican			

==== By county ====
County	Angus King Independent		Joseph Brennan Democratic		Susan Collins Republican		Jonathan Carter Green		Write-ins		Margin		Total votes
County	#	%	#	%	#	%	#	%	#	%	#	%	Total votes
Androscoggin	18,265	45.4%	14,232	35.4%	5,426	13.5%	1,739	4.3%	539	1.3%	4,033	10.0%	40,201
Aroostook	7,155	24.5%	10,020	34.4%	10,669	36.6%	861	3.0%	450	1.5%	-649 (Note: Compares margin between Collins and Brennan.)	-2.2%	29,155
Cumberland	41,139	37.9%	39,229	36.1%	19,469	17.9%	7,606	7.0%	1,207	1.1%	1,910	1.8%	108,650
Franklin	5,163	41.4%	4,204	33.7%	2,039	16.3%	979	7.8%	98	0.8%	959	7.7%	12,483
Hancock	6,514	29.1%	5,073	22.7%	8,246	36.9%	2,328	10.4%	199	0.9%	-1,732 (Note: Compares margin between Collins and King.)	-7.8%	22,360
Kennebec	18,087	37.0%	18,882	38.6%	8,441	17.3%	2,955	6.0%	553	1.1%	-795	-1.6%	48,918
Knox	6,152	38.4%	4,027	25.1%	4,122	25.7%	1,460	9.1%	272	1.7%	2,030 (Note: Compares margin between King and Collins.)	12.7%	16,033
Lincoln	6,477	41.5%	4,167	26.7%	3,428	22.0%	1,282	8.2%	243	1.6%	2,310	14.8%	15,597
Oxford	8,138	37.5%	7,857	36.2%	4,137	19.1%	1,327	6.1%	237	1.1%	281	1.3%	21,696
Penobscot	16,955	28.7%	17,403	29.4%	19,905	33.6%	3,618	6.1%	1,296	2.2%	-2,502	-4.2%	59,177
Piscataquis	2,131	27.9%	2,206	28.9%	2,649	34.7%	514	6.7%	141	1.8%	-443	-5.8%	7,641
Sagadahoc	6,710	46.7%	4,208	29.3%	2,244	15.6%	1,002	7.0%	190	1.3%	2,502	17.4%	14,354
Somerset	6,487	33.7%	7,023	36.4%	4,085	21.2%	1,411	7.3%	263	1.4%	-536	-2.7%	19,269
Waldo	5,720	32.9%	3,557	24.8%	4,279	29.9%	1,576	11.0%	195	1.4%	441	4.0%	14,327
Washington	3,427	26.4%	3,840	29.6%	4,742	36.5%	721	5.6%	257	2.0%	-602	-6.9%	12,987
York	23,309	34.0%	27,023	39.5%	14,109	20.6%	3,316	4.8%	703	1.0%	-3,714	-5.5%	68,460
Totals	180,829	35.4%	172,951	33.8%	117,990	23.1%	32,695	6.4%	6,843	1.3%	7,878	1.6%	511,308

Counties that flipped from Democratic to Independent

- Androscoggin (largest city: Lewiston)
- Cumberland (largest city: Portland)
- Oxford (largest town: Rumford)

Counties that flipped from Republican to Independent

- Franklin (largest town: Farmington)
- Lincoln (largest city: Waldoboro)
- Knox (largest municipality: Rockland)
- Sagadahoc (largest town: Bath)
- Waldo (largest city: Belfast)

Counties that flipped from Republican to Democratic

- York (largest town: Biddeford)

== Analysis ==
King would narrowly win over Brennan, with Collins and Carter lagging behind. King would carry much of southern and western Maine — including traditionally Democratic Cumberland and Androscoggin counties — while Brennan would take York County in the extreme south of the state, Kennebec County in Mid-Maine, and Somerset County in western Maine. Collins would win much of northern and eastern Maine. King and Brennan would tie in the municipalities of Chester, Lyman, and Northfield, while King and Collins would tie in Castle Hill, Hersey, Talmadge, and Topsfield, and Brennan and Collins would tie in Merrill.

=== Aftermath ===
Collins and Brennan would face off again for William Cohen's Senate seat in 1996, with Collins winning. King would be re-elected in a landslide in 1998. After a decade outside of political office, King would be elected to the U.S. Senate in 2012. King and Collins held Maine's two Senate seats from 2013 until Collins was defeated for re-election in 2026.
