= Mary Adams (activist) =

American tax activist from Maine (born 1938)

- Born: 1938 (age 87–88); Dover-Foxcroft, Maine, U.S.
- Occupation: Activist
- Spouse: Thatcher Adams (m. 1962)
- Children: 2

Mary G. Adams (born 1938) is an American tax activist from Maine. Adams successfully led the effort to repeal Maine's statewide property tax in the mid-1970s. She led a failed 2006 referendum effort to enact a Taxpayer Bill of Rights in the state.

In the mid-1970s, Adams challenged Maine's educational establishment and through her grass roots "Freedom Fighters" successfully repealed Maine's statewide property tax and prevented the state from reducing local control of public schools in Maine.

In 1994, Adams unsuccessfully ran for Governor of Maine. She sought the Maine Republican Party's nomination, finishing in sixth out of eight candidates. Susan Collins won the nomination.

In both 1996 and 1997, Adams and her "Common Sense" grass roots effort defeated a citizens' initiative to expand the regulation of private forest land in Maine.

Adams was appointed to the Maine State Board of Education by Maine's first independent Governor, James B. Longley following the repeal of the statewide property tax.
