= Martin Defense Group =

American military contractor

PacMar Technologies
- Formerly: Navatek, Martin Defense Group
- Type: Private
- Headquarters: Honolulu, Hawaii
- Key people: Steven Loui

PacMar Technologies, formerly Navatek and later Martin Defense Group, is a military contractor based in Hawaii, founded by Steven Loui in 1979. It was later sold to Martin Kao.

== Company history ==
Navatek was founded by Steven Loui in 1979 (47 years ago). Martin Kao joined Navatek as CFO in the late 2000's, and in 2019 took over the company. Loui sold the company to Kao and gave him most of the company's shares in 2019.

Navatek changed its name to Martin Defense Group in September 2020. An indictment against Kao was unsealed on 30 September 2020. Kao was charged with bank fraud and money laundering related to the CARES Act. In November 2020, Kao stepped down, with Daniel J. Brunk taking over. In September 2022 Kao pleaded guilty to bank fraud and money laundering in a plea agreement with federal prosecutors. Kao's sentencing was scheduled for January 2023. However, in January, Kao faced a new federal bank fraud charge. He pleaded not guilty. Kao was sentenced to 87 months in prison in 2025. In 2022, ownership of Navatek reverted back to Loui. Loui has renamed the company "PacMar Technologies".

== Hydrofoil catamarans ==
They purchased an 85-foot (26 m) hydrofoil catamaran named the Skye and known as Navatek II. By 2019 it was sitting, derelict and gathering fees, in the Ala Wai Harbor. and failed to sell at auction. It began to sink, then was removed by crane.

The company donated a similar 45-foot (14 m) vessel to Hawaii Pacific University in 2016.

== Lobbying ==
Check for $150,000 to Maine Senator Susan Collins Super PAC 1820 from the "Society of Young Women Scientist and Engineers" – a shell company for the defense contractor Navatek.

Kao and Navatek made notable political donations from 2013 to 2020, prompting an investigation into their donations to Maine Senator Susan Collins. On February 10, 2022, three former executives, including Kao, were indicted for illegal campaign contributions. All three have pleaded guilty and face sentencing in August 2023.

Kao and Navatek also made significant political donations to Lindsey Graham, Jim Clyburn, and Joe Wilson.

== See also ==
- DARPA Captive Air Amphibious Transporter
