= DARPA Captive Air Amphibious Transporter =

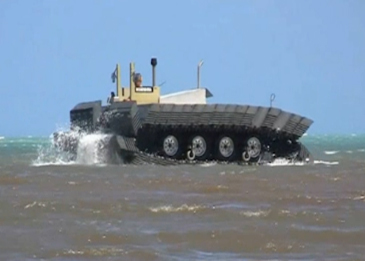
- CAAT driving on water
- Type: Amphibious vehicle
- Place of origin: United States

Service history
- Used by: DARPA (R&D vehicle)

Production history
- Designer: Navatek

Specifications
- Length: 31m
- Width: 8m
- Height: 5m
- Crew: 1 driver
- Maximum speed: 37 km/h (water)

External videos
- Official Youtube video for 1/5 scale
- Half scale carrying Humvee
- UHAC½ unloading a vehicle
- UHAC½ at sea
- UHAC½ coming aboard the USS Rushmore

The Captive Air Amphibious Transporter (CAAT) is a 1:5 scale tracked amphibious vehicle prototype being developed by DARPA. It drives on the water with air-filled pontoons attached to the tracks and is intended to demonstrate how to transport standard 20- or 40-foot containers from ordinary container ships to shore without using a harbor. DARPA is investigating its usefulness in disasters so that commercial shipping can relieve military ships to focus on military tasks. The CAAT is one of four elements in the Tactically Expandable Maritime Platform (TEMP) program; the others being a containerized living quarter, a stabilized crane, and an unmanned powered parachute delivering containers by air.

== UHAC ==
UHAC
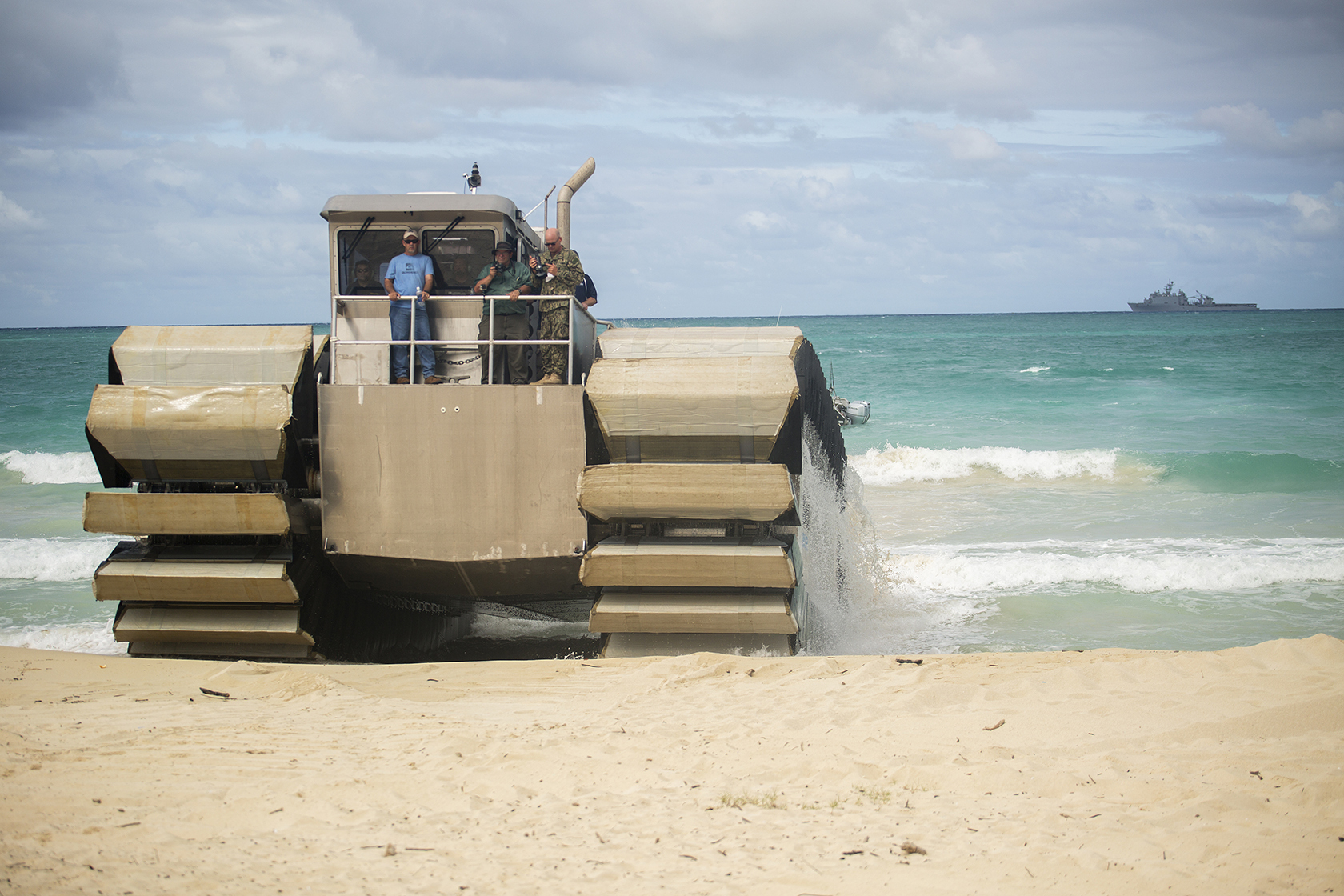
- Ultra Heavy-Lift Amphibious Connector lands on the shore during RIMPAC 2014.
- Type: Amphibious connector
- Place of origin: United States

Service history
- Used by: United States Marine Corps

Production history
- Designer: Navatek

Specifications
- Length: 84 ft (26 m)
- Height: 34 ft (10 m)
- Operational range: 200 nmi (230 mi; 370 km)
- Maximum speed: 20 knots (37 km/h) (water)

The Marine Corps Warfighting Laboratory is using the CAAT's air-filled track system in its Ultra Heavy-Lift Amphibious Connector (UHAC) concept. The objective is to develop a new amphibious connector to transport U.S. Marine Corps vehicles from ship to shore in heavier loads and over shore obstacles. A half-scale demonstrator was used during RIMPAC 2014, where it was loaded with an Internally Transportable Vehicle, launched from the USS Rushmore (LSD-47), then paddled to shore. The demonstrator was 42 ft (13 m) long, 26 ft (8 m) wide, 17 ft (5 m) high, weighed 38 tons, and traveled at 4–5 knots (7.4–9.3 km/h) knots on water; the hull was made of aluminum, with a small pilothouse mounted on the bow. Using track feet fitted with dense air-impregnated foam blocks make it buoyant in the water and propel it on land, allowing it to traverse through mud, sand, and marshland when ashore. This made the demonstrator's ground pressure about 1 PSI, compared to 9.7 PSI for the Amphibious Assault Vehicle. The full-size UHAC is planned to be 84 ft (26 m) long and up to 34 ft (10 m) high. The UHAC is primarily aimed at potentially replacing the Landing Craft Air Cushion hovercraft, but it could also supplement it and replace the Landing Craft Utility. Compared to the LCAC, the UHAC is planned to have a heavier payload of 150 tons (standard) to 190 tons (overload) compared to 65 tons, a longer range of 200 nmi (230 mi; 370 km) compared to 86 nmi (99 mi; 159 km), has the advantage of using its tracks to move inland from the beach and over 10 ft (3.0 m) sea walls, and is estimated to cost less than half as much to build and maintain per unit; the LCAC has a faster water speed of over 30 knots compared to 20 knots for the UHAC, and a smaller area of 1,800 sq ft (170 m^{2}) compared to 2,500 sq ft (230 m^{2}). The UHAC would be faster on water than the AAV and could even transport them to get closer to shore or carry up to three M1 Abrams tanks. A production version would be survivable with a lower profile, armor, and armament. The concept for the UHAC began in 2008 with the goal to design an amphibious vehicle with low PSI. The Office of Naval Research accepted the design from Navatek, and three prototypes have been constructed since (a one-fifth scale model, a one-quarter scale model, and the half-scale model). Currently, the UHAC effort is a collaborative effort between the U.S. ONR and the Singapore Ministry of Defense Science and Technology department. No decision has been made on taking the final steps necessary to produce the full-scale version.
