= Christine Powers =

American politician and librarian

Member of the Maine House of Representatives for the 101st District
- In office December 2012 – December 2014
- Preceded by: Richard Cebra
- Succeeded by: Redistricted

Member of the Maine House of Representatives for the 68th District
- In office December 2014 – December 2016
- Preceded by: Redistricted
- Succeeded by: Richard Cebra

Personal details
- Party: Democratic
- Profession: Librarian
- Website: Official site

Christine Powers is an American politician and librarian from Maine. A Democrat, Powers was a member of the Maine House of Representatives from December 2012 until December 2016. She has served on the Naples Board of Selectmen since 2002 and as Director of the Naples Public Library.

She replaced Richard Cebra as State Representative. Cebra subsequently was chosen Chairman of the Maine Republican Party.
