= National Weather Service Caribou, Maine =

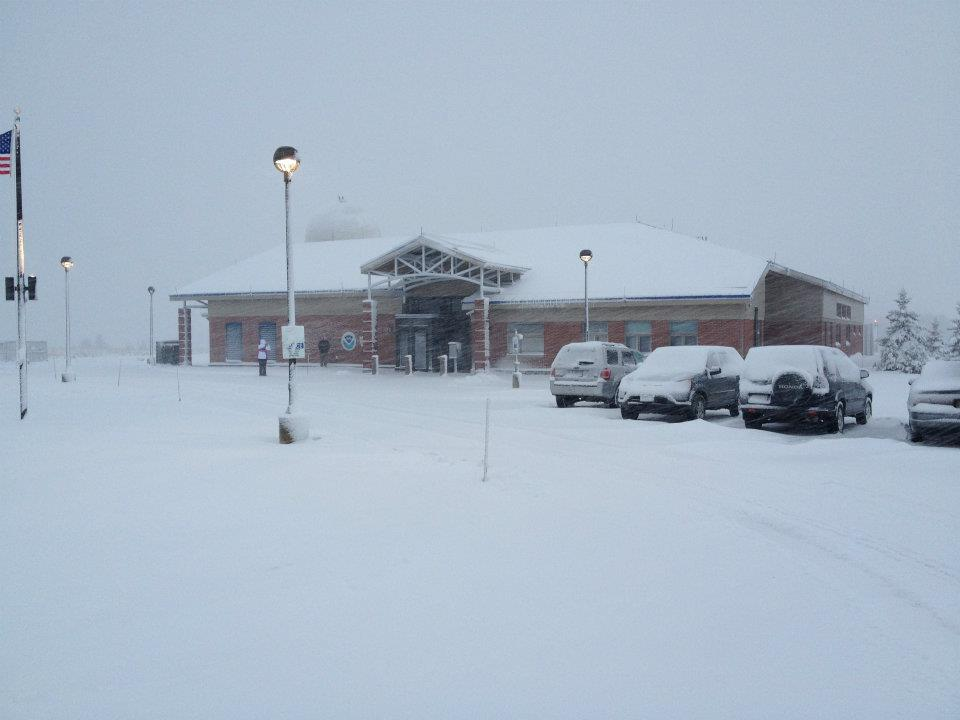
- The office in winter 2011.
- Types: branch
- Location: Caribou
- Country: United States
- Coordinates: 46°52′06″N 68°00′49″W
- Website: www.weather.gov/car/

The National Weather Service Caribou, Maine is a local office of the National Weather Service responsible for monitoring weather conditions in northern Maine. It is co-located with an upper air sounding facility but the NEXRAD radar KCBW is near Houlton, Maine, further south.

== Mission ==
Coverage of NWS Weather Forecast Offices where Caribou is CAR.

The National Weather Service in Caribou provides weather, hydrologic, and climate forecasts and warnings for northeastern Maine, and adjacent waters for the protection of life and property and the enhancement of the national economy.

== NOAA Weather Radio ==
National Weather Service Caribou, Maine forecast office provides programming for eight NOAA Weather Radio stations in Maine.

City of license	Call sign	Frequency (MHz)	Power
Ellsworth	KEC93	162.400 MHz	1,000 watts
Milo	KHB54	162.550 MHz	1,000 watts
Frenchville	KHB55	162.475 MHz	300 watts
Meddybemps	KHC47	162.425 MHz	300 watts
Greenville	WNG542	162.425 MHz	300 watts
Jonesboro	WNG543	162.450 MHz	1,000 watts
Caribou	WXM77	162.525 MHz	200 watts
Springfield	WXN28	162.500 MHz	1,000 watts
