= Martin Kao =

American former businessman

- Spouse: Tiffany Jennifer Lam

Martin Kao is an American former businessman, currently serving an 87-month term in federal prison for wire fraud. Kao was the president and CEO of Navatek LLC, a Hawaii-based engineering firm and US defense contractor.

== Career ==
In 2022, Kao was sentenced to 87 months in prison for wire fraud, after fraudulently obtaining over $12.8 million in loans from the Paycheck Protection Program.

In September 2024, a judge allowed Kao to attend classes at Harvard University in advance of his sentencing.

In October 2025, Kao was sentenced to 33 months in prison for engineering a scheme to send over $200,000 in illegal campaign donations to Senator Susan Collins and a super PAC that supported her 2020 reelection bid. The illegal donations were made following Navatek receiving an $8 million federal contract that Collins secured funding for, and subsequently celebrated during an August 2019 ceremony with Navatek executives, including Kao.

=== Susan Collins pay-to-play probe ===
In September 2026, ProPublica published a report detailing an investigation into Kao and his relationship with Senator Susan Collins.

The FBI shut down the probe in 2025.

== Personal life ==
Kao is married to Tiffany Jennifer Lam.
