= Sumner Lipman =

American politician and attorney

Sumner H. Lipman

Member of the Maine House of Representatives (District 90)
- In office 1991–1994
- Preceded by: Daniel B. Hickey

Personal details
- Party: Republican
- Education: Boston University
- Profession: Attorney

Sumner H. Lipman was an American politician and attorney from Maine. Lipman, a Republican from Augusta, Maine, served in the Maine House of Representatives from 1991 to 1994.

Lipman sought the Republican Party's nomination for governor in 1994. He finished in second place behind future U.S. Senator Susan Collins with 17.3% of the vote.

Lipman is a founding partner of Lipman & Katz, P.A., which began in 1971. Lipman & Katz focuses on personal injury and medical malpractice. He graduated from Boston University with a B.A. in 1963 and a J.D. in 1966.
