= Judith Foss =

American politician

Judith C. Foss

Member of the Maine House of Representatives (District 40)
- In office 1985–1994
- Preceded by: Edward Ainsworth
- Succeeded by: John T. Buck

Personal details
- Party: Republican

Judith C. Foss was an American politician from Maine. Foss, a Republican from Yarmouth, Maine, served in the Maine House of Representatives from 1985 to 1994.

Foss sought the Republican Party's nomination for governor in 1994. She finished in fourth place out of eight candidates.
