= Donald Collins (Maine politician) =

American politician (1925–2018)

Member of the Maine Senate from the 2nd district
- In office December 1986 – December 1992
- Succeeded by: Leo Kieffer

Member of the Maine Senate from the 31st district
- In office December 1976 – December 1978
- Preceded by: Hayes Gahagan

Member of the Maine House of Representatives from Aroostook
- In office December 1970 – December 1972

Mayor of Caribou, Maine
- In office 1968–1970

Personal details
- Born: Donald Frederick Collins; November 30, 1925 Caribou, Maine, U.S.
- Died: March 10, 2018 (aged 92) Caribou, Maine, U.S.
- Party: Republican
- Spouse: Patricia McGuigan (m. 1948)
- Children: 6, including Susan
- Education: University of Maine (BA)

Military service
- Allegiance: United States
- Branch/service: United States Army
- Years of service: 1943–1946
- Rank: Sergeant
- Battles/wars: World War II; Battle of the Bulge
- Awards: Bronze Star Medal; Purple Heart (2)

Donald Frederick Collins (November 30, 1925 – March 10, 2018) was an American politician from Maine. Collins, a Republican from Caribou, Aroostook County, served 5 terms in the Maine Legislature between 1970 and 1992. He also served as mayor of Caribou.

In 1970, Collins was elected to the Maine House of Representatives, and served a single term. In 1976, Collins was elected to his first, two-year term in the Maine Senate. Running again in 1986, Collins was re-elected, serving three more terms in the Maine Senate, retiring in 1992 from elected office.

== Background and Family ==
Donald Collins was the father of United States Senator Susan Collins. His brother, Samuel W. Collins Jr., sat on the Maine Supreme Judicial Court from 1988 to 1994 and served in the Maine Senate from 1972 to 1984. He was one of four children in his family and had six children. Collins was born in Caribou, Maine. He served in the United States Army during World War II, receiving a Bronze Star for heroism, and a Purple Heart with an Oak Leaf Cluster, after being wounded twice in the Battle of the Bulge. Collins went to the University of Maine. He worked in the family lumber business, established by his great-great grandfather, Samuel Collins, in 1844.
