= Robert Woodbury (academic administrator) =

American politician

Robert Woodbury (1938 - September 12, 2009) was an American politician and university administrator. Woodbury was the Chancellor of the University of Maine system from 1986 to 1993. In 1994, Woodbury ran in the Democratic Party's primary for Governor, losing to former Governor Joe Brennan. Woodbury finished in fourth place with 8%.

After earning his Ph.D., Woodbury worked as professor at the California Institute of Technology. Leaving California, Woodbury took an administrative position at the University of Massachusetts Amherst. He moved to Maine in 1979 and took a position with the University of Maine. He helped form the Muskie School of Public Service at the University of Southern Maine.

== Personal ==
Woodbury graduated from Belmont Hill School, a boarding school in Massachusetts, in 1956. He married Anne Pelletreau in August 1959 and graduated from Amherst College a year later. He earned his Ph.D. in American studies from Yale University in 1966. Woodbury was diagnosed with cancer in January 2009 and died on September 12, 2009. His son, Richard G. Woodbury, served in the Maine House of Representatives from 2002 to 2008 and was elected to the Maine Senate in 2010.
