= Pamela Cahill =

American politician

Member of the Maine House of Representatives
- In office 1981–1986

Personal details
- Party: Republican
- Profession: Partner at Howe, Cahill & Company

Pamela Cahill is a lobbyist and politician from Maine. Cahill, was elected to seven consecutive terms between the Maine House of Representatives (1981–1986) and Maine Senate (1987–1994). The Wiscasset Republican served in leadership positions, both as Assistant Minority Leader and Minority Leader. She ran unsuccessfully for the Republican nomination for governor in the Maine gubernatorial election, 1994. She was twice elected Assistant Secretary of the Maine Senate, in both 1994 and 2000. She also served as Chairwoman of the Maine Republican Party.

Cahill is a partner at the governmental relations firm Howe, Cahill & Company.
