= 2026 Maine House of Representatives election =

- November 3, 2026

all 151 seats in the Maine House of Representatives 76 seats needed for a majority
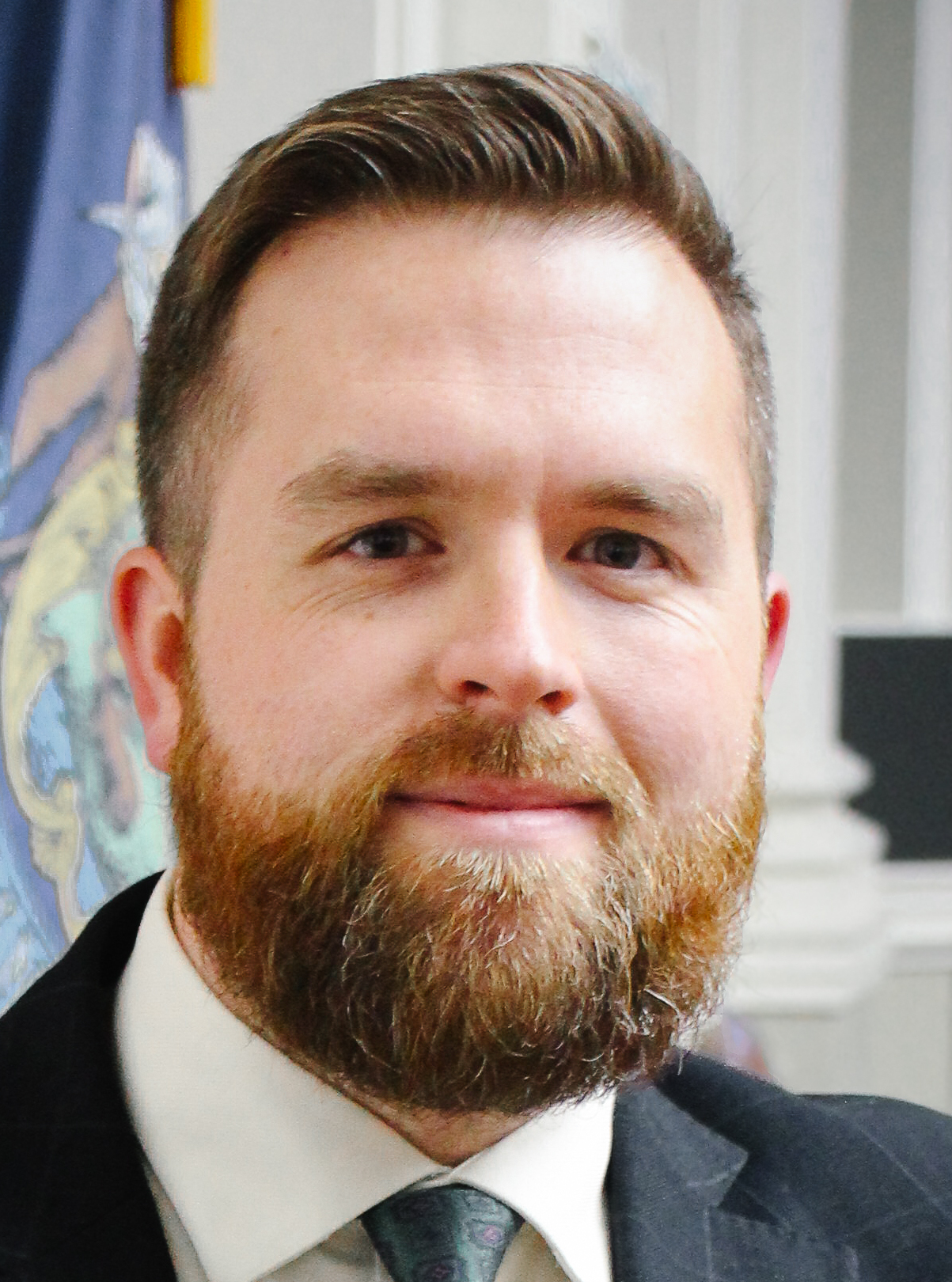

Leader	Ryan Fecteau	Billy Bob Faulkingham (term-limited)
Party	Democratic	Republican
Leader since	December 4, 2024	December 7, 2022
Leader's seat	132nd	12th
Last election	76	73
Current seats	75	73
Seats needed	▲1	▲3
Seats up	76	73
Party	Independent
Last election	2
Current seats	3
Seats up	0
- Democratic incumbent Democratic incumbent retiring/term-limited Republican incumbent Republican incumbent retiring/term-limited
Incumbent Speaker
Ryan Fecteau
Democratic

The 2026 Maine House of Representatives election was held on November 3, 2026, alongside the other 2026 United States elections. Voters elected members of the Maine House of Representatives in all 151 of the U.S. state of Maine's legislative districts to serve a two-year term.

== Retirements ==
=== Democratic ===
- District 23: Amy Roeder is retiring to run for Maine Senate.
- District 39: Janice Dodge is term-limited.
- District 41: Victoria Doudera is term-limited.
- District 43: Ann Matlack is term-limited and running for Maine Senate.
- District 46: Lydia Crafts is retiring.
- District 48: Holly Stover is term-limited.
- District 49: Allison Hepler is term-limited.
- District 55: Daniel Shagoury is retiring.
- District 59: David Rollins is retiring.
- District 75: Stephan Bunker is retiring.
- District 95: Mana Abdi is retiring to run for Maine Senate.
- District 96: Michel Lajoie is retiring.
- District 102: Melanie Sachs is retiring.
- District 103: Arthur L. Bell is retiring.
- District 109: Eleanor Sato is retiring to run for Maine Senate.
- District 122: Deqa Dhalac is retiring.
- District 124: Sophia Warren is retiring to run for Maine Senate.
- District 131: Lori Gramlich is term-limited.
- District 135: Daniel Sayre is retiring to run for Maine Senate.
- District 142: Anne-Marie Mastraccio is retiring.
- District 149: Tiffany Roberts is term-limited and attempted to run for United States Congress.
- District 150: Michele Meyer is term-limited and running for Maine Senate.

=== Republican ===
- District 1: Lucien Daigle is retiring to run for Maine Senate.
- District 3: Mark Babin is retiring.
- District 5: Joseph F. Underwood is retiring.
- District 7: Gregory Swallow is retiring.
- District 12: Billy Bob Faulkingham is term-limited.
- District 27: Gary Drinkwater is term-limited.
- District 31: Chad R. Perkins is retiring.
- District 32: Steven D. Foster is term-limited.
- District 34: Abigail Griffin is term-limited.
- District 45: Abden Simmons is retiring.
- District 66: Robert Nutting is retiring.
- District 67: Shelley Rudnicki is term-limited.
- District 72: Elizabeth Caruso is retiring.
- District 74: Randall Hall is term-limited.
- District 80: Caldwell Jackson is retiring.
- District 82: Nathan Wadsworth is retiring.
- District 85: Kimberly Pomerleau is retiring to run for Maine Senate.
- District 90: Laurel Libby is retiring.
- District 91: Joshua Morris is term-limited.
- District 97: Rick Mason is term-limited.
- District 104: Amy Arata is term-limited.
- District 138: Mark Blier is term-limited.
- District 139: David Woodsome is retiring.
- District 141: Lucas Lanigan is retiring.
- District 143: Ann Fredericks is retiring.
- District 145: Robert Foley is retiring.

=== Independent ===
- District 112: Ed Crockett is retiring to run for Governor.

== Predictions ==
Source	Ranking	As of
Sabato's Crystal Ball	Lean D	January 22, 2026
State Navigate	Safe D	October 21, 2026

== Special elections ==
=== 94th district ===
Democratic incumbent Kristen Cloutier resigned from the Maine House of Representatives on October 31, 2025, to become chief of staff to Maine Senate President Mattie Daughtry. A special election was held on February 24, 2026. Democratic candidate Scott Harriman won the election, defeating Republican candidate Janet Beaudoin.

2026 Maine House of Representatives special election, 94th District
Party	Candidate	Votes	%
Democratic	Scott A. Harriman	572	53.11%
Republican	Janet I. Beaudoin	503	46.70%
	Blank ballots	2	0.19%
Total votes		1,077	100.00%
Democratic hold			

=== 29th district ===
Incumbent Republican representative Kathy Javner died on January 10, 2026. A special election was held on June 9. Republican Nancy Theriault defeated Democrat Nancy McDowell and will serve the remainder of Javner's term.

2026 Maine House of Representatives special election, 29th District (unofficial results)
Party	Candidate	Votes	%
Republican	Nancy Theriault	1,192	61.13%
Democratic	Nancy McDowell	758	38.87%
Total votes		1,920	100.00%
Republican hold			

== Results ==
Italics denote an open seat held by the incumbent party; bold text denotes a gain for a party.

State House District	Incumbent	Party	Elected Representative	Outcome
1st	Lucien J.B. Daigle	Rep	Austin Theriault	Rep Hold
2nd	Roger Albert	Rep	Roger Albert	Rep Hold
3rd	Mark Babin	Rep	Susan Y. Bernard	Rep Hold
4th	Timothy Guerrette	Rep	Timothy Guerrette	Rep Hold
5th	Joseph F. Underwood	Rep	Douglas Carlisle	Rep Hold
6th	Donald Ardell	Rep	Donald Ardell	Rep Hold
7th	Gregory Swallow	Rep	Jantzen Craine	Rep Hold
8th	Tracy Quint	Rep	Tracy Quint	Rep Hold
9th	Arthur Kevin Mingo	Dem	Arthur Kevin Mingo	Rep Hold
10th	William R. Tuell	Rep	William R. Tuell	Rep Hold
11th	Tiffany Strout	Rep	Tiffany Strout	Rep Hold
12th	Billy Bob Faulkingham	Rep	Thomas Arthur Hart Jr.	Rep Hold
13th	Russell White	Dem	**Russell White**	Rep Hold
14th	Gary Friedmann	Dem	Gary Friedmann	Dem Hold
15th	Holly Eaton	Dem	Holly Eaton	Dem Hold
16th	Nina Milliken	Dem	Nina Milliken	Dem Hold
17th	Steven Bishop	Rep	Steven Bishop	Rep Hold
18th	Mathew McIntyre	Rep	Mathew McIntyre	Rep Hold
19th	Richard H. Campbell	Rep	Richard H. Campbell	Rep Hold
20th	Dani L. O'Halloran	Dem	Dani L. O'Halloran	Dem Hold
21st	Ambureen Rana	Dem	Ambureen Rana	Dem Hold
22nd	Laura Supica	Dem	Laura Supica	Dem Hold
23rd	Amy Roeder	Dem	Victoria Kornfield	Dem Hold
24th	Sean Faircloth (Note: Won seat in a 2025 special election following Joe Perry's resignation.)	Dem	Sean Faircloth	Dem Hold
25th	Laurie Osher	Dem	Laurie Osher	Dem Hold
26th	James Dill	Dem	James Dill	Dem Hold
27th	Gary Drinkwater	Rep	David Giles	Rep Hold
28th	Irene Gifford	Rep	Irene Gifford	Rep Hold
29th	Nancy J. Theriault (Note: Won seat in a 2026 special election following Kathy Javner's death.)	Rep	Nancy J. Theriault	Rep Hold
30th	James L. White	Rep	James L. White	Rep Hold
31st	Chad R. Perkins	Rep	Andrew R. Torbett	Rep Hold
32nd	Steven D. Foster	Rep	Shawn L. Lancaster	Rep Hold
33rd	Kenneth Fredette	Rep	Kenneth Fredette	Rep Hold
34th	Abigail W. Griffin	Rep	Stacey Guerin	Rep Hold
35th	James E. Thorne	Rep	James E. Thorne	Rep Hold
36th	Kimberly M. Haggan	Rep	Kimberly M. Haggan	Rep Hold
37th	Reagan Paul	Rep	Reagan Paul	Rep Hold
38th	Benjamin C. Hymes	Rep	Benjamin C. Hymes	Rep Hold
39th	Janice Dodge	Dem	Madison Cook	Dem Hold
40th	Michael Ray	Dem	Michael Ray	Dem Hold
41st	Victoria Doudera	Dem	Joshua Gerritsen	Dem Hold
42nd	Valli Geiger	Dem	Valli Geiger	Dem Hold
43rd	Ann Matlack	Dem	Rhiannon Hampson	Dem Hold
44th	William Pluecker	Ind	Shawn Saindon	Ind Hold
45th	Abden Simmons	Rep	Clinton Collamore	**Ind Gain**
46th	Lydia Crafts	Dem	Jennifer F. Mayher	Dem Hold
47th	Wayne Farrin	Dem	Wayne Farrin	Dem Hold
48th	Holly Stover	Dem	Charlotte Nutt	Dem Hold
49th	Allison Hepler	Dem	Trent E. Vellella	Dem Hold
50th	David Sinclair	Dem	David Sinclair	Dem Hold
51st	Rafael Macias	Dem	Rafael Macias	Dem Hold
52nd	Sally Jeane Cluchey	Dem	Sally Jeane Cluchey	Dem Hold
53rd	Michael Lemelin	Rep	Michael Lemelin	Rep Hold
54th	Karen Montell	Dem	Karen Montell	Dem Hold
55th	Daniel Shagoury	Dem	Maureen AuCoin	Dem Hold
56th	Randall Greenwood	Rep	Randall Greenwood	Rep Hold
57th	Tavis Hasenfus	Dem	Tavis Hasenfus	Dem Hold
58th	Sharon Frost	Ind	Sharon Frost	Ind Hold
59th	David Rollins	Dem	Katrina Couch Ray-Saulis	Dem Hold
60th	William Bridgeo	Dem	William Bridgeo	Dem Hold
61st	Alicia Collins	Rep	Alicia Collins	Rep Hold
62nd	Katrina Smith	Rep	Katrina Smith	Rep Hold
63rd	Paul Flynn	Rep	Paul Flynn	Rep Hold
64th	Flavia DeBrito	Dem	Flavia DeBrito	Dem Hold
65th	Cassie Julia	Dem	Cassie Julia	Dem Hold
66th	Robert Nutting	Rep	Michael Perkins	Rep Hold
67th	Shelley Rudnicki	Rep	Shawn M. Dixon	Rep Hold
68th	Amanda Collamore	Rep	Amanda Collamore	Rep Hold
69th	Dean Cray	Rep	Dean Cray	Rep Hold
70th	Jennifer Poirier	Rep	Jennifer Poirier	Rep Hold
71st	John Ducharme	Rep	John Ducharme	Rep Hold
72nd	Elizabeth Caruso	Rep	Douglas Andrew Thomas	Rep Hold
73rd	Michael Soboleski	Rep	Michael Soboleski	Rep Hold
74th	Randall C. Hall	Rep	Russell Black	Rep Hold
75th	Stephan Bunker	Dem	H. Scott Landry	Dem Hold
76th	Sheila A. Lyman	Rep	Sheila A. Lyman	Rep Hold
77th	Tammy Schmersal-Burgess	Rep	Tammy Schmersal-Burgess	Rep Hold
78th	Rachel Ann Henderson	Rep	Rachel Ann Henderson	Rep Hold
79th	Michael Lance	Rep	Michael Lance	Rep Hold
80th	Caldwell Jackson	Rep	Ernest M. Fitts IV	Rep Hold
81st	Peter Wood	Rep	**Christopher A. Easton**	**Dem Gain**
82nd	Nathan J. Wadsworth	Rep	**Christopher Alfred Lewey**	**Dem Gain**
83rd	Marygrace Cimino	Rep	**Timothy J. Becker**	**Dem Gain**
84th	Mark Walker	Rep	Mark Walker	Rep Hold
85th	Kimberly Pomerleau	Rep	Adrienne Paul	Rep Hold
86th	Rolf A. Olsen	Rep	Uncalled	
87th	David Boyer	Rep	David Boyer	Rep Hold
88th	Quentin Chapman	Dem	**Dana Staples**	**Dem Gain**
89th	Adam R. Lee	Dem	Adam R. Lee	Dem Hold
90th	Laurel Libby	Rep	**Pamela B. Hart**	**Dem Gain**
91st	Joshua Morris	Rep	Jeffrrey Timberlake	Rep Hold
92nd	Stephen J. Wood	Rep	Stephen J. Wood	Rep Hold
93rd	Julia A.G. McCabe	Dem	Julia A.G. McCabe	Dem Hold
94th	Scott Harriman (Note: Won seat in a 2026 special election following Kristen Cloutier's resignation.)	Dem	Scott Harriman	Dem Hold
95th	Mana Abdi	Dem	Kiernan Majerus-Collins	Dem Hold
96th	Michel Lajoie	Dem	**Lee Clement**	**Rep Gain**
97th	Richard G. "Rick" Mason	Rep	Dale Crafts	Rep Hold
98th	Kilton Webb	Dem	Kilton Webb	Dem Hold
99th	Cheryl Golek	Dem	Cheryl Golek	Dem Hold
100th	Daniel Ankeles	Dem	Daniel Ankeles	Dem Hold
101st	Poppy Arford	Dem	Poppy Arford	Dem Hold
102nd	Melanie Sachs	Dem	Maura Pillsbury	Dem Hold
103rd	Arthur L. Bell	Dem	Karin Orenstein	Dem Hold
104th	Amy Arata	Rep	R. Melissa Winslow	Rep Hold
105th	Anne P. Graham	Dem	Anne P. Graham	Dem Hold
106th	Barbara Bagshaw	Rep	**Bradley M. Youngs**	**Dem Gain**
107th	Mark Cooper	Rep	**Joseph Campbell**	**Dem Gain**
108th	Parnell Terry	Dem	Parnell Terry	Dem Hold
109th	Eleanor Sato	Dem	Seven Siegel	Dem Hold
110th	Christina Mitchell	Dem	Christina Mitchell	Dem Hold
111th	Amy Kuhn	Dem	Amy Kuhn	Dem Hold
112th	W. Edward Crockett	Ind (Note: Elected as a Democrat, became an independent during his term.)	Sean M. Mahoney	Dem Hold
113th	Grayson Lookner	Dem	Grayson Lookner	Dem Hold
114th	Dylan Pugh	Dem	April Dawn Fournier	Dem Hold
115th	Michael F. Brennan	Dem	Andrew Zarro	Dem Hold
116th	Samuel Zager	Dem	Samuel Zager	Dem Hold
117th	Matthew Moonen	Dem	Matthew Moonen	Dem Hold
118th	Yusuf Yusuf	Dem	Yusuf Yusuf	Dem Hold
119th	Charles Skold	Dem	Michael P. Dixon	Dem Hold
120th	Deqa Dhalac	Dem	Jason Shedlock	Dem Hold
121st	Christopher Kessler	Dem	Lucy Louisa Perkins	Dem Hold
122nd	Matthew D. Beck	Dem	Matthew D. Beck	Dem Hold
123rd	Michelle Boyer	Dem	Michelle Boyer	Dem Hold
124th	Sophia Warren	Dem	Eric Nathanson	Dem Hold
125th	Kelly Noonan Murphy	Dem	Kelly Noonan Murphy	Dem Hold
126th	Andrew Gattine	Dem	Andrew Gattine	Dem Hold
127th	Morgan Rielly	Dem	Morgan Rielly	Dem Hold
128th	Suzanne Salisbury	Dem	Suzanne Salisbury	Dem Hold
129th	Marshall Archer	Dem	Marshall Archer	Dem Hold
130th	Lynn Copeland	Dem	Lynn Copeland	Dem Hold
131st	Lori Gramlich	Dem	Robert James Kelly	Dem Hold
132nd	Ryan Fecteau	Dem	Ryan Fecteau	Dem Hold
133rd	Marc Malon	Dem	Marc Malon	Dem Hold
134th	Traci Gere	Dem	Traci Gere	Dem Hold
135th	Daniel Sayre	Dem	Lisa Pratt	Dem Hold
136th	John M. Eder	Rep	John M. Eder	Rep Hold
137th	Nathan Carlow	Rep	**Charles Tilburg**	**Dem Gain**
138th	Mark Blier	Rep	Jonathan Lee Kinney	Rep Hold
139th	David Woodsome	Rep	Jamie K. Newton	Rep Hold
140th	Wayne Parry	Rep	Wayne Parry	Rep Hold
141st	Lucas Lanigan (Note: Lanigan resigned following the election, but prior to the end of his term.)	Rep	Marc A. Boisse	Rep Hold
142nd	Anne-Marie Mastraccio	Dem	Ayn M. Hanselmann	Dem Hold
143rd	Ann Marie Fredericks	Rep	**John R. Henkelman**	**Dem Gain**
144th	Jeffrey S. Adams	Rep	Karen Gerrish	Rep Hold
145th	Robert Alan Foley	Dem	Kristin T. Davis	**Dem Gain**
146th	Walter Runte	Dem	Walter Runte	Dem Hold
147th	Holly Sargent	Dem	Holly Sargent	Dem Hold
148th	Thomas Lavigne	Rep	**Marissa L. Tasker**	**Dem Gain**
149th	Tiffany Danielle Roberts	Dem	Mallory A. Cook	Dem Hold
150th	Michele Meyer	Dem	Alexandros Orestis	Dem Hold
151st	Kristi Mathieson	Dem	Kristi Mathieson	Dem Hold
**Non-Voting Members**
Passamaquoddy	Aaron Dana	NVT (Note: Non-voting tribal member)	Aaron Dana	NVT
Maliseet	Brian Reynolds	NVT		NVT
