= 2026 Maine Senate election =

United States local election

- November 3, 2026

All 35 seats in the Maine Senate 18 seats needed for a majority
	Majority party	Minority party
Leader	Mattie Daughtry	Trey Stewart
Party	Democratic	Republican
Leader since	December 4, 2024	November 10, 2022
Leader's seat	23rd	2nd
Last election	20	15
Seats before	20	14
Seats won	24	11
Seat change	▲4	▼3
Seats up	20	14
Races won	24	11
	Third party
Party	Independent
Last election	N/A
Seats before	1
Seats up	0
- Democratic incumbent Democratic incumbent retiring Republican incumbent Republican incumbent retiring Independent incumbent retiring
President of the Maine Senate before election
Mattie Daughtry
Democratic
Elected President of the Maine Senate
Mattie Daughtry
Democratic

The 2026 Maine Senate election was held on November 3, 2026, alongside the other 2026 United States elections. Voters elected members of the Maine Senate in all 35 seats to serve a two-year term.

Democrats won a supermajority of 24 seats, their first since 1985. This includes winning the Norway area seat for the first time since 1992.

== Retirements ==
=== Democrat ===
- District 9: Joe Baldacci is retiring to run for the United States House of Representatives from Maine's 2nd congressional district.
- District 12: Pinny Beebe-Center is retiring.
- District 21: Peggy Rotundo is retiring.
- District 30: Stacy Brenner is retiring.
- District 34: Joe Rafferty is retiring.
- District 35: Mark Lawrence is term-limited.

=== Republican ===
- District 1: Susan Y. Bernard is retiring to run for the Maine House of Representatives.
- District 3: Brad Farrin is term-limited.
- District 4: Stacey Guerin is term-limited.
- District 5: Russell Black is term-limited.
- District 6: Marianne Moore is term-limited.
- District 15: Richard Bradstreet is retiring.
- District 17: Jeff Timberlake is term-limited.
- District 22: James Libby is retiring.

=== Independent ===
- District 18: Rick Bennett is retiring to run for Governor. He was a Republican until announcing his campaign.

== Predictions ==
Source	Ranking	As of
Sabato's Crystal Ball	Likely D	January 22, 2026
State Navigate	Safe D	January 22, 2026

== Results ==
Italics denote an open seat held by the incumbent party; bold text denotes a gain for a party.

State Senate District	Incumbent	Party	Elected Senator	Outcome
1st	Susan Y. Bernard	Rep	Lucien J.B. Daigle	Rep Hold
2nd	Harold L. "Trey" Stewart III	Rep	Harold L. "Trey" Stewart III	Rep Hold
3rd	Bradlee Thomas "Brad" Farrin	Rep	Joel Stetkis	Rep Hold
4th	Stacey K. Guerin	Rep	Chad R. Perkins	Rep Hold
5th	Russell J. Black	Rep	Elizabeth M. Caruso	Rep Hold
6th	Marianne Moore	Rep	Billy Bob Faulkingham	Rep Hold
7th	Nicole C. Grohoski	Dem	Nicole C. Grohoski	Dem Hold
8th	Michael "Mike" Tipping	Dem	Michael "Mike" Tipping	Dem Hold
9th	Joseph M. "Joe" Baldacci	Dem	Amy Roeder	Dem Hold
10th	David G. Haggan	Rep	David G. Haggan	Rep Hold
11th	Glenn Chip Curry	Dem	Glenn Chip Curry	Dem Hold
12th	Anne H. "Pinny" Beebe-Center	Dem	Ann H. Matlack	Dem Hold
13th	Cameron D. Reny	Dem	Cameron D. Reny	Dem Hold
14th	Craig V. Hickman	Dem	Craig V. Hickman	Dem Hold
15th	Richard Bradstreet	Rep	**Amanda Heath**	**Dem Gain**
16th	Scott Cyrway	Rep	**Patric Aaron Moore**	**Dem Gain**
17th	Jeffrey L. "Jeff" Timberlake	Rep	Richard G. Mason	Rep Hold
18th	Richard A. "Rick" Bennett	Ind (Note: Elected as a Republican.)	**Elizabeth Bosworth**	**Dem Gain**
19th	Joseph E. Martin	Rep	Joseph E. Martin	Rep Hold
20th	Bruce Bickford	Rep	**Michael R. Scott**	**Dem Gain**
21st	Margaret R. "Peggy" Rotundo	Dem	Shanna Cox	Dem Hold
22nd	James D. Libby	Rep	Kimberly J. Pomerleau	Rep Hold
23rd	Matthea Elisabeth "Mattie" Daughtry	Dem	Matthea Elisabeth "Mattie" Daughtry	Dem Hold
24th	Denise Tepler	Dem	Denise Tepler	Dem Hold
25th	Teresa S. Pierce	Dem	Teresa S. Pierce	Dem Hold
26th	Timothy E. "Tim" Nangle	Dem	Timothy E. "Tim" Nangle	Dem Hold
27th	Jill C. Duson	Dem	Jill C. Duson	Dem Hold
28th	Rachel Talbot Ross	Dem	Rachel Talbot Ross	Dem Hold
29th	Anne M. Carney	Dem	Anne M. Carney	Dem Hold
30th	Stacy Fielding Brenner	Dem	Sophia Bailey Warren	Dem Hold
31st	Donna Bailey	Dem	Donna Bailey	Dem Hold
32nd	Henry L. Ingwersen	Dem	Henry L. Ingwersen	Dem Hold
33rd	Matthew A. Harrington	Rep	Matthew A. Harrington	Rep Hold
34th	Joseph E. "Joe" Rafferty Jr.	Dem	Daniel Sayre	Dem Hold
35th	Mark W. Lawrence	Dem	Michele Meyer	Dem Hold
