= Mastraccio =

Mastraccio or Mastracchio is a surname. Notable people with the surname include:

- Anne-Marie Mastraccio, American politician
- Richard Mastracchio (born 1960), American astronaut
