= Lucas Lanigan =

American politician

Member of the Maine House of Representatives from the 141st district
- In office December 7, 2022 – November 16, 2026
- Preceded by: Kathy Javner

Personal details
- Party: Republican

Lucas Lanigan is an American politician and businessman. From 2022 until his resignation in 2026, he served as the representative for the 141st district in the Maine House of Representatives. A member of the Republican Party, he previously served on the city council of Sanford, Maine, from 2016 to 2021, and served as the city's deputy mayor at one point.

In October 2024, Lanigan was charged with one count of domestic violence aggravated assault, stemming from an incident where he allegedly choked his wife for around 20 seconds. His arrest led to numerous calls from Democratic leaders in the House for Lanigan to resign, including speaker Rachel Talbot Ross and majority leader Maureen Terry. Lanigan won re-election in 2024, defeating his Democratic opponent by just a singular vote.

In January 2025, an ethics investigation into Lanigan was started by the House.

== Life and career ==
Lanigan co-owns the Mill Towne Tavern in Sanford, Maine, alongside Billy Bruno. Lanigan has a wife named Catalina. At the time of his 2020 campaign for Sanford mayor, he operated a women's clothing store with Catalina and owned Event Lighting Concepts.

=== Sanford City Council (2014–2021) ===
Lanigan ran unsuccessfully for a seat on the city council of Sanford in 2014. Two years later, he ran again and won; he was sworn in on January 6, 2016. As a city councilor, he served as deputy mayor of Sanford and chair of Sanford's marijuana policy task force. In May 2017, Lanigan criticized Sanford Parks and Recreation Director Marcel Blouin on a Facebook post, questioning Blouin's competence and honesty due to local lacrosse fields that were yet to be painted. He soon removed the posts a few days later and apologized, stating that his "intention was to draw attention to an issue that should have been handled through the correct channels, and not Facebook." At a city council meeting in September 2019, Lanigan alleged that drug houses were "known" by the Sanford Police Department, stating that "for [the department] not to be able to multitask and maybe write a ticket and enforce drug incidents is really sad." Following Lanigan's remarks, police chief Thomas Connolly began hiring an officer from the Maine Drug Enforcement Agency.

In August 2020, Lanigan filed paperwork to run for mayor of Sanford. In his campaign, Lanigan praised the incumbent mayor—Tom Cote, who was term-limited—for his "impeccable leadership" and said that he "just want[s] to keep that momentum moving forward." Lanigan was running against state representative Anne-Marie Mastraccio and former Sanford town councilor Victor DiGregorio. In a candidates forum held virtually in October, Lanigan said that he would help attract more businesses and residents to Sanford, describing the city as a "business-friendly community" but lacking a "business-friendly process" for companies. When the election was held in November, Lanigan ended up losing to Mastraccio, receiving 4,409 votes to Mastraccio's 4,634. In a post-election statement, Lanigan thanked his supporters, however was "disappointed we didn't get the W." He further stated that he "will continue to use my voice for our businesses and our residents, moving Sanford to its next economic revolution." Mastraccio was sworn in as mayor of Sanford on January 1, 2021.

2020 Sanford mayoral election
Candidate	Votes	%
Anne-Marie Mastraccio	4,634	45.61%
Lucas Lanigan	4,409	43.40%
Victor DiGregorio	1,117	10.99%
Total votes	10,160	100.00%

Facebook post by Lucas Lanigan, January 31, 2021

Communities have local budget control over schools. No kids in school! No school budget! #defundteachersunion.

On January 31, 2021, Lanigan posted on Facebook advocating to defund teachers' unions. Within the following days, educators and residents alike had written to Mastraccio in complaint to Lanigan's post. Mastraccio read them out in a city council meeting held two days after Lanigan made his comments, as well as reading, in full, a letter from fellow councilor Ayn Hanselmann. In the letter, Hanselmann said that his remarks could be damaging to the city's current budget process and that they did not represent the whole council's view. She also said it marginalized teachers, created an appearance of division, did not give residents opportunities to engage, and offered no solutions. Lanigan claimed that his post was referencing the Chicago Teachers Union and the "$170 billion being requested that is holding up the stimulus package." Mastraccio alleged that he was pertaining to teachers in Sanford rather than in Chicago. After failing to reach out to Lanigan via private messages, Mastraccio stripped Lanigan of his three subcommitee positions on February 2. Following this action, Lanigan claimed that Mastraccio lacks the authority to remove him from his subcommittee assignments, as well as emphasizing his stance on freedom of speech in regards to his Facebook page.

Responses to Lanigan from city councilors were mixed. Jonathan Martell said that Lanigan had "valuable input" and only wanted to "express his personal opinion and his frustration with the lack of in-person classes this year." Bob Stackpole said that Lanigan had "multiple violations of the code of conduct." In March, Lanigan sued Mastraccio, the Sanford City Council, and the city of Sanford, alleging that Mastraccio violated the city council's Code of Conduct and Rules and Order of Business and the City Charter. He also claimed that his First Amendment and due process rights were violated. Attorneys for the city of Sanford soon filed to dismiss the lawsuit.

=== Maine House of Representatives (2022–present) ===
On August 10, 2021, Lanigan announced that he would forgo a third term to the Sanford city council and instead run for the Maine House of Representatives after being asked by the Maine GOP Caucus to do so. Originally running for the House's 19th district, he later ran for the 141st district. In the Republican Party primary, he won unopposed, and faced Democrat Jack McAdam in the general election. Lanigan promised that, if elected, he would try to reduce food, fuel, and electricity costs in Maine, and criticized the Republican's lack of willingness to work with Democrats. In the general election, Lanigan defeated McAdam by over 10 percentage points. Lanigan, alongside the rest of the legislature, was sworn in on December 7, 2022.

2022 Maine's 141st House of Representatives district general election
Party	Candidate	Votes	%
Republican	Lucas Lanigan	2,216	55.73%
Democratic	John McAdam	1,760	44.27%
Total votes		3,976	100.00%

==== Domestic violence charge and 2024 election ====
On October 25, 2024, the Sanford Police Department issued an arrest warrant for Lanigan on one count of domestic violence aggravated assault, a class B felony. According to the warrant, he "did intentionally, knowingly or recklessly cause bodily injury" to a female "under circumstances manifesting extreme indifference to the value of human life."

An affidavit filed by Jeremy Riddle, a Sanford police officer, wrote that Lanigan's wife Catalina had discovered him having an affair in a storage unit. She confronted him, where Lanigan then proceeded to grab Catalina "around the neck with both hands and choked her for approximately 20 seconds." An act legally and medically referred to as non-fatal strangulation, which exponentially increases the risk of intimate partner homicide perpetrated against victims. She was able to get away and go back home, calling two of her friends. First responders took Catalina to the Maine Medical Center in Sanford, where they discovered bruises on both the left and right sides of her neck. She also had marks on her face and nose and within her mouth.

Three days after the arrest warrant was issued, Lanigan turned himself in to the York County Jail on October 28, nearly a week before Election Day. Lanigan had his first court hearing on October 30. At the court hearing, Catalina attempted to have Lanigen's charge dropped, claiming that he had never tried to choke her and was instead trying to help her. Initially held without bail, district court judge John Lucy set his bail to $3,000 as Lanigan had "no appreciable criminal record" and a low risk of re-offense. Lanigan was released on bail on November 1.

Following his arrest, Democratic legislators and leaders called for Lanigen's resignation. Rachel Talbot Ross, the speaker of the Maine House of Representatives, called for "his immediate resignation," stating that "it is clear that he no longer has the public’s trust or the ethical or moral standing necessary to serve in the Maine House of Representatives." Majority leader Maureen Terry and assistant majority leader Kristen Cloutier also called for Lanigan's resignation. Bev Uhlenhake, chair of the Maine Democratic Party, said that the allegations against Lanigan were "appalling, and they are far beyond the conduct we as Mainers will tolerate from anyone claiming or seeking to represent us in the state legislature." House Republican leader Billy Bob Faulkingham stated that the allegations will be resolved in court: "I trust our justice system and remain confident that our justice system is the best in the world and that it will be resolved there." Patty Kidder, Lanigen's Democratic opponent in the 2024 election, said that she did not believe that Lanigan "has any business making laws that affect anyone, especially women."

Lanigan stated on November 1 that he had no intentions of canceling his re-election bid, with his lawyer stating: "We have a principle in this country." In the 2024 election, while initial results on November 6 showed Kidder with a significant lead over Lanigan tied, the city of Sanford reported a human error, and a new count showed Kidder and Lanigan tied, each having 2,476 votes. Following the tie, a recount was held. The recount showed Lanigan leading over Kidder by a margin of just one vote. Lanigan was sworn into office for his second term on December 4, 2024.

2024 Maine's 141st House of Representatives district general election
Party	Candidate	Votes	%
Republican	Lucas Lanigan	2,478	50.01%
Democratic	Patricia Kidder	2,477	49.99%
Total votes		4,955	100.00%

In December 2024, speaker Ryan Fecteau quietly removed Lanigan from the House Labor Committee. On January 8, 2025, the House approved an ethics investigation into Lanigan in a 74–69 following requests from Democrats. Lanigan, who voted against the motion, walked out of the chamber following the vote's conclusion. The following day, a protest in Sanford was held to raise awareness surrounding domestic violence.

On November 16, 2026, Lanigan resigned from his seat. His successor, fellow Republican Marc A. Boisse, had been elected two weeks prior.
