= David Rollins =

David Rollins may refer to:

- David Rollins (baseball)
- David Rollins (actor)
- David Rollins (politician)
