= Roger Fuller =

American politician

Member of the Maine House of Representatives for the 59th District
- In office December 7, 2016 – December 5, 2018
- Preceded by: Margaret Rotundo
- Succeeded by: Margaret Craven

Personal details
- Party: Democrat
- Education: University of Maine
- Profession: Retired educator

Roger Jason Fuller is an American politician who represented part of Lewiston in the Maine House of Representatives as a Democrat from 2016 to 2018. He grew up in New Hampshire. He lives in Lewiston.

== Education ==
Fuller earned a BA degree from the University of Maine, Orono, in 1972. In 1979, he earned a MS from the University of Maine Orono. In 1989, he earned an MEd from the University of Virginia, Charlottseville. In 1999, he earned a MD from Thomas College in Waterville. In 2009, he earned a PhD from Antioch University.

== Biography ==
Fuller grew up in New Hampshire. Fuller served as a teacher and principal at Oak Hill High School for 28 years. He was an English teacher, department chair and the speech and debate coach. Fuller coordinated the gifted and talented program at Oak Hill. Previously, he taught at Lewiston High School.

In 2016, Fuller was elected to the Maine House of Representatives for the 59th District. In 2018, Fuller announced he would not seek reelection to his seat and endorsed Margaret Craven to succeed him.

Fuller is married and has two children and four grandchildren.
