= Anne C. Perry =

American politician (born 1947)

Member of the Maine House of Representatives from the 9 district
- In office December 6, 2022 – December 3, 2024
- Preceded by: Traci Gere
- Succeeded by: Arthur Mingo

Member of the Maine House of Representatives from the 140th district
- In office 2002–2012
- Succeeded by: Wayne Parry

Personal details
- Born: September 6, 1947 (age 78) Bangor, Maine, U.S.
- Party: Democratic
- Children: 3
- Education: Bachelor of Science in nursing, Master of Science in nursing
- Alma mater: Husson University, University of Maine
- Profession: Nurse

Anne C. Perry (born September 6, 1947) is an American politician who served as member of the Maine House of Representatives, representing Maine's 9th House district from 2022 to 2024.

== Electoral history ==
She was elected to the 140th district in the 2008 Maine House of Representatives election. In 2010 she was term limited. She ran for election to the senate in the 2012 Maine Senate election, but lost. She ran for election to the senate in the 2014 Maine Senate election, but lost. She was elected to the house in the 2016 Maine House of Representatives election. She was re-elected to the house in the 2018 Maine House of Representatives election. She was re-elected to the house in the 2020 Maine House of Representatives election. Due to redistricting, she was elected to the 9th district in the 2022 Maine House of Representatives election.

== Biography ==
Perry earned a Bachelor of Science in nursing from the University of Maine in 1970 and a Master of Science in nursing from Husson University in 1998.
