= Farrin =

Farrin is a surname. Notable people with the surname include:

- Brad Farrin (born 1964), American politician from Maine
- Suzanne Farrin (born 1976), American composer and ondist
- Wayne Farrin, American politician from Maine
