= Nathan Wadsworth =

American politician

Member of the Maine House of Representatives from the 82nd district
- Incumbent
- Assumed office December 4, 2024
- Preceded by: Caleb Ness

Member of the Maine House of Representatives from the 70th district
- In office December 3, 2014 – December 7, 2022
- Preceded by: R. Wayne Werts
- Succeeded by: Jennifer Poirier

Personal details
- Party: Republican
- Education: Montana State University

Nathan J. Wadsworth is an American politician from Hiram, Maine who has been serving as a member of the Maine House of Representatives since 2024. He had previously served as representative from 2014 to 2022.

Wadsworth was a candidate in the 2024 Maine House of Representatives election in District 82. He won the general election in November.
