= Nancy Theriault =

American politician

Member of the Maine House of Representatives for District 29
- Incumbent
- Assumed office July 14, 2026
- Preceded by: Kathy Javner

Personal details
- Party: Republican

Nancy Theriault is an American politician who has represented District 29 on the Maine House of Representatives since 2026. Her district contains the towns of Chester, East Millinocket, Grindstone Township, Herseytown Township, Long A, Medway, Millinocket, Mount Chase, North Penobscot, Patten, Soldiertown Township and Woodville. She was elected in a special election to replace Kathy Javner. She is a member of the Agriculture, Conservation and Forestry Committee. She is a registered nurse.

She is a candidate in the 2026 Maine House of Representatives election.

== See also ==
- List of nurse-politicians
