= Charlotte Nutt =

American politician

Member-elect of the Maine House of Representatives from the 48th district
- Assuming office December 2026
- Succeeding: Holly Stover

Personal details
- Party: Democratic

Charlotte Nutt is an American politician. A member of the Democratic Party, she is the member-elect for the 48th district of the Maine House of Representatives.
