= Lydia Crafts =

American politician and social worker

Member of the Maine House of Representatives from the 90th district
- Incumbent
- Assumed office December 2, 2020
- Preceded by: Michael Devin
- Succeeded by: Jennifer Mayher

Personal details
- Born: Belfast, Maine, U.S.
- Party: Democratic
- Spouse: Kevin
- Children: 2
- Education: Smith College (BA); University of Maine (MSW)

Lydia V. Crafts is an American politician and social worker serving as a member of the Maine House of Representatives from the 90th district. She assumed office on December 2, 2020.

== Early life and education ==
Crafts was born in Belfast, Maine. She earned a Bachelor of Arts degree in anthropology from Smith College and a Master of Social Work from the University of Maine.

== Career ==
Outside of politics, Crafts works as a clinical social worker and the behavior program director of Bristol Consolidated School. She was elected to the Maine House of Representatives in November 2020 and assumed office on December 2, 2020. She was re-elected in 2022 and 2024 but chose not to run for re-election in 2026.

Crafts endorsed independent state senator Rick Bennett for Governor of Maine in the 2026 election. Bennett had been a Republican prior to the start of his campaign. In September 2026, Crafts claimed that Governor Janet Mills, a fellow Democrat who was backing Democratic nominee Hannah Pingree, had blocked Crafts from getting a state government job because she had endorsed Bennett.
