= Douglas Carlisle =

American politician

Member-elect of the Maine House of Representatives from the 5th district
- Assuming office December 2026
- Succeeding: Joseph F. Underwood

Personal details
- Party: Republican

Douglas Carlisle is an American politician. A member of the Republican Party, he is the member-elect for the 5th district of the Maine House of Representatives.
