= Ambureen Rana =

American politician

Member of the Maine House of Representatives from the 21st district
- Incumbent
- Assumed office December 7, 2022
- Preceded by: Barbara Cardone

Personal details
- Born: Brewer, Maine
- Party: Democratic
- Education: University of Maine

Ambureen Rana is an American politician who has served as a member of the Maine House of Representatives since December 7, 2022. She represents Maine's 21st House district, which covers part of the city of Bangor.

== Early life and education ==
Rana was born and raised in Brewer and attended Brewer High School, where she participated in the Brewer Youth Theater. Rana later attended the University of Maine where she earned a Bachelor of Science in biology. Rana also earned a certificate in Leadership, Organizing and Action from the Harvard Kennedy School.

== Career ==
Rana has worked at a number of non-profits and progressive advocacy organizations. She was the policy and programs director at the Maine Women's Lobby and has worked as a community organizer and advocate with Maine Equal Justice and with the Health Equity Alliance.

== Politics ==
In 2018, Rana won the Democratic nomination for the 100th district in the 2018 Maine House of Representatives election, but withdrew. In 2022, Bangor Democrats selected Rana to be their nominee for House District 21, after Democratic incumbent Barbara Cardone withdrew. Rana won the 21st district seat in the 2022 Maine House of Representatives election with 58% of the vote.

In her first term, Rana introduced legislation that created a long-term funding mechanism for recovery community centers. The legislature passed and funded the bill, which allocates $2 million annually using revenue generated from recreational cannabis sales.

In 2024, Rana was re-elected with 54% of the vote against Republican Reda Edelman and independent Colby Lapointe. In her second term, Rana was selected to serve on the Maine House of Representatives' Appropriation and Financial Affairs Committee. In 2025, Rana introduced and secured funding to permanently establish the Eviction Prevention Program.

After being re-elected in 2026, Rana was chosen as assistant majority leader of the House of Representatives.

== Electoral History ==
=== 2022 Maine House District 21 ===
2022 Maine House of Representatives General Election
Party	Candidate	Votes	%
Democratic	Ambureen Rana	1,878	58.2%
Independent	Marianna Reeves	1,350	41.8%
Total votes		3,228	100%

=== 2024 Maine House District 21 ===
==== 2024 Maine House of Representatives Primary Election ====
Party	Candidate	Votes	%
Democratic	Ambureen Rana	236	100%
Total votes		3,228	100%

2024 Maine House of Representatives General Election
Party	Candidate	Votes	%
Democratic	Ambureen Rana	2,358	54.7%
Republican	Rena Edelman	1,429	33.2%
Independent	Colby Lapointe	523	12.1%
Total votes		4,310	100%

== Personal Life ==
Rana lives in Bangor. She is LGBTQ+ and Muslim.

Maine House of Representatives
Preceded by Heidi Sampson	Member of the Maine House of Representatives; 2022–present	Succeeded by incumbent
