= Joseph F. Underwood =

American politician

Member of the Maine House of Representatives from the 5th district
- Incumbent
- Assumed office December 7, 2022
- Preceded by: Beth O'Connor
- Succeeded by: Douglas Carlisle (elect)

Member of the Maine House of Representatives from the 147h district
- In office December 2020 – December 7, 2022
- Preceded by: Harold Stewart
- Succeeded by: Holly Sargent

Personal details
- Party: Republican
- Spouse: name
- Children: name, name
- Education: Bachelor of Science
- Alma mater: Husson University

Joseph F. Underwood is an American politician who has served as a member of the Maine House of Representatives since December 2020.

== Electoral history ==
Underwood is a Republican. He was elected to the 147th district in the 2020 Maine House of Representatives election and redistricted to the 5th district in the 2022 Maine House of Representatives election.

== Biography ==
Underwood earned a Bachelor of Science from Husson University.
