= Jantzen Craine =

American politician

Member-elect of the Maine House of Representatives from the 7th district
- Assuming office December 2026
- Succeeding: Gregory Swallow

Personal details
- Party: Republican

Jantzen Craine is an American politician. A member of the Republican Party, he is the member-elect for the 7th district of the Maine House of Representatives.
