= Donald Ardell =

American politician

Member of the Maine House of Representatives from the 6th district
- Incumbent
- Assumed office December 7, 2022
- Preceded by: Tiffany Roberts-Lovell

Personal details
- Party: Republican
- Spouse: Corazon Ardell
- Children: 4
- Education: Bachelor of Arts
- Alma mater: State University of New York at Plattsburgh
- Profession: Criminal investigator

Donald Ardell is an American politician who has served as a member of the Maine House of Representatives from the 6th district. He assumed office on December 7, 2022. A Republican, he represents communities in Aroostook County, including Monticello, Mars Hill, and Mapleton. Before becoming a politician, he was a federal agent and criminal investigator.

== Electoral history ==
Ardell was elected on November 8, 2022, in the 2022 Maine House of Representatives election. He assumed office on December 7, 2022. He is serving in the 131st and 132nd Maine Legislatures. Ardell serves on the Criminal Justice and Public Safety Committee and the Engrossed Bills Committee.

== Political career ==
In the Maine House, Ardell has been active on issues affecting his district. In 2023, he opposed a gun-control bill, describing it as “unconstitutional” and saying it “disrespects the rights of our constituents.” He supported LD 439, a 2025 measure allowing youth with junior hunting licenses or 18-year-old secondary-school students to hunt on Sundays during the appropriate season. In November 2024, Ardell joined other Aroostook legislators in urging the Libra Foundation and Pineland Farms to keep the Presque Isle Nordic Heritage Outdoor Center open. He also backed a 2025 bill providing tax credits to potato processors in Aroostook County to support local jobs, working alongside Sen. Trey Stewart and other Republican lawmakers.

== Biography ==
Ardell resides in Monticello, Maine.

Before entering politics, he had a long career in federal law enforcement as a special agent and criminal investigator from approximately 1996 to 2021. His work included service with agencies such as the U.S. Immigration and Naturalization Service, U.S. Customs Service, and Homeland Security Investigations, as well as collaboration with the Maine Drug Enforcement Agency. He also served internationally, including an assignment in Jeddah, Saudi Arabia. Ardell is a retired federal law enforcement officer. He earned a Bachelor of Arts in fine arts and criminology from the State University of New York at Plattsburgh in 1995.

He is married to Corazon Ardell and has four children.

Maine House of Representatives
| Preceded by Tiffany Roberts-Lovell | Member of the Maine House of Representatives; 2022–present | Succeeded by incumbent |
