= H. Scott Landry =

American politician

Member of the Maine House of Representatives from the 75th district
- In office December 7, 2022 – December 3, 2024
- Preceded by: Joshua Morris
- Succeeded by: Stephan Bunker

Member of the Maine House of Representatives from the 113th district
- In office December 2016 – December 7, 2022
- Preceded by: Lance Harvell
- Succeeded by: Stephan Bunker

Personal details
- Born: 1948 or 1949 (age 76–77) Dexter Maine
- Party: Democratic
- Spouse: Brenda
- Children: 7
- Education: Bachelor of Science
- Alma mater: University of Maine at Farmington

H. Scott Landry Jr. (born 1948) is an American politician who served as a member of the Maine House of Representatives from December 2016 to December 2024. He also owns a small farm.

== Electoral history ==
Scott Landry was first elected to the 113th district in the 2016 Maine House of Representatives election. He was reelected in the 2018 Maine House of Representatives election. He was reelected in the 2020 Maine House of Representatives election. He was redistricted and elected to the 75th district in the 2022 Maine House of Representatives election.

== Biography ==
Landry earned a Bachelor of Science in elementary education from the University of Maine at Farmington in 1970.
