= Margaret Craven (politician) =

American politician from Maine

Member of the Maine House of Representatives
- In office December 7, 2022 – 2024
- Preceded by: Valli Geiger
- Succeeded by: Michelle Boyer
- Constituency: 93rd district
- In office December 5, 2018 – December 7, 2022
- Preceded by: Roger Fuller
- Succeeded by: Raegan LaRochelle
- Constituency: 59th district
- In office December 4, 2002 – December 3, 2008
- Succeeded by: Margaret Rotundo
- Constituency: 59th district

Member of the Maine Senate from the 16th district
- In office December 3, 2008 – December 3, 2014
- Preceded by: Margaret Rotundo
- Succeeded by: Nate Libby

Personal details
- Born: 1944 (age 81–82) Galway, Ireland
- Party: Democratic
- Spouse(s): Jim Craven (died, 2017)
- Profession: Community activist, politician

Margaret Craven (born 1944) is an American politician from Maine. Craven served as a Democratic State Senator from Maine's 16th District, representing Lewiston. She was first elected to office in 2002, when she won a seat in the Maine House of Representatives. She served in the House from 2002 to 2008, when she was elected to the Maine State Senate. She was re-elected in 2010 and 2012. In February 2014, Craven announced her retirement from Maine politics following the 2014 election, citing the need to take care of her ailing husband.

In 2018, after her husband's death, Craven announced her candidacy for the Maine House of Representatives in the 59th district. She won the uncontested Democratic primary in June, and defeated her Republican opponent in the November general election.

== Personal ==
Craven was born into an impoverished family of 11 in Galway, Ireland; her father worked odd jobs and her mother was a housewife. Craven moved to Boston, Massachusetts in 1961 at the age of 17 and worked as a housekeeper. She eventually returned to Ireland, only to move back to New England after feeling a sense of not belonging. She moved to Maine, earned a high school diploma, bachelor's and master's degrees and began work with the disabled and senior citizens. She was convinced to run in 2002 by the outgoing state representative. She has two children, Walter Matthew and TJ.
