= Cheryl Golek =

American politician

Member of the Maine House of Representatives from the 99th district
- Incumbent
- Assumed office December 7, 2022
- Preceded by: MaryAnne Kinney

Personal details
- Born: Maine
- Party: Democratic
- Spouse: Johanna Wigg
- Children: 4

Cheryl Golek is an American politician who has served as a member of the Maine House of Representatives since December 7, 2022. She represents Maine's 99th House district.

== Electoral history ==
She was elected on November 8, 2022, in the 2022 Maine House of Representatives election against Republican opponent Stephen Davis. She assumed office on December 7, 2022.

== Career ==
Golek started work in the house as a volunteer lobbyist for the recognition of the Wabanaki sovereignty. She also started a care center for those living with dementia called The Vicarage by the Sea with her wife Johanna Wigg. In 2021, Golek was appointed to a commission on zoning and land use restrictions.

Maine House of Representatives
Preceded by MaryAnne Kinney	Member of the Maine House of Representatives; 2022–present	Succeeded by incumbent
