= Marshall Archer =

American politician

Marshall F. Archer is an American politician from Maine. He is a Democrat and represented District 129 in the Maine House of Representatives. He was first elected in 2024.

== Biography ==
Archer served in the United States Marine Corps from 2001 to 2005 twice deploying to Iraq. He is the holder of a bachelor’s degree in social work from the University of Southern Maine and a master's degree in social work from the University of New England. Archer served as the Deputy Mayor and Councilor in Ward 1 for the City of Saco.
