= Tracy Quint =

American politician

Member of the Maine House of Representatives
- Incumbent
- Assumed office December 7, 2022
- Preceded by: Christopher Babbidge
- Constituency: 8th district
- In office December 2, 2020 – December 7, 2022
- Preceded by: Gregory Swallow
- Succeeded by: Jeffrey S. Adams
- Constituency: 144th district

Personal details
- Party: Republican
- Spouse: Clayton
- Children: 2
- Occupation: Nurse

Tracy Quint is an American politician from Hodgdon, Maine. She is currently serving in the Maine House of Representatives from the 8th district, having first been elected in 2020 from the Republican Party.

== Career ==
Quint is a registered nurse. She got her degree in 1997.

In September 2020, incumbent Representative Gregory Swallow withdrew from the race for the Maine House of Representatives seat from the 144th district after winning the Republican primary unopposed. Tracy Quint announced that she would seek the seat instead in early October, running as a Republican. Her platform emphasized combatting obesity, support for small businesses, and support for the Second Amendment. Quint won the election, defeating Democrat Kathryn Harnish with 68 percent of the vote.

In March 2021, Quint introduced a bill that would ban mandates of the COVID-19 vaccine in Maine until 2024. Quint said the measure was "not an anti-vaccine bill", arguing in part that it was intended to stem reproductive harm. Patrick Whittle with the Associated Press pushed back on this claim, citing the Centers for Disease Control and Prevention's statement that there is "no evidence that any of the COVID-19 vaccines affect future fertility". Whittle also said that Maine was not considering any vaccine mandates at the time of the bill's drafting. The bill was later dropped in May 2021. Quint again introduced legislation prohibiting vaccine mandates in 2022; a legislative committee rejected it in January of that year.

In August 2021, Quint spoke at a rally protesting a COVID-19 vaccination mandate for Maine healthcare workers. The progressive States Newsroom affiliate Maine Beacon said that the event "validated false and dangerous claims about vaccines, at times framing the public health initiative as a government experiment in violation of individual liberties."

In November 2022, Quint won re-election to the Maine House of Representatives with 72.8% of the vote.

== Personal life ==
Quint is married and has two children.

== Electoral history ==
2020 Maine House of Representatives election, District 144
Party	Candidate	Votes	%
Republican	Tracy Quint	2,835	68.3%
Democratic	Kathryn Harnish	1,325	31.7%

2024 Maine House of Representatives election, District 8
Party	Candidate	Votes	%
Republican	Tracy Quint	3,865	77.9%
Democratic	Nicole Collins	1,096	22.1%
