= Karen Montell =

American politician

Member of the Maine House of Representatives from the 54th district
- Incumbent
- Assumed office December 7, 2022
- Preceded by: Denise Tepler

Personal details
- Born: Gardiner, Maine
- Party: Democratic
- Spouse: Donald Brown
- Children: 2
- Education: Modeling degree
- Alma mater: Barbizon Modeling and Acting School
- Profession: Model

Karen Montell is an American politician who has served as a member of the Maine House of Representatives since December 7, 2022. She represents Maine's 54th House district. She has worked as a small business owner and as a legislative staffer before being elected.

== Electoral history ==
She was elected on November 8, 2022, in the 2022 Maine House of Representatives election. She assumed office on December 7, 2022.

== Biography ==
Montell graduated from Gardiner High School. She earned a modeling degree from Barbizon Modeling and Acting School in 1989.

Maine House of Representatives
Preceded by Denise Tepler	Member of the Maine House of Representatives; 2022–present	Succeeded by incumbent
