= Traci Gere =

American politician

Member of the Maine House of Representatives
- Incumbent
- Assumed office December 7, 2022
- Preceded by: Genevieve McDonald
- Constituency: 134th district
- In office December 2, 2020 – December 7, 2022
- Preceded by: Diane Denk
- Succeeded by: Anne C. Perry
- Constituency: 9th district

Personal details
- Party: Democratic
- Children: 2
- Education: Brown University (BA) Boston University (MBA)

Traci Gere is an American politician from Maine. She is the representative for Maine House District 9. She is on the Labor and Housing committee. She defeated Steadman Seavey in the 2020 Maine House election with 58% of the vote.
