= Michael Lance =

American politician

Member of the Maine House of Representatives from the 79th district
- Incumbent
- Assumed office December 3, 2024
- Preceded by: John Andrews

Personal details
- Party: Republican

Michael J. Lance is an American politician. He has served as a member of the Maine House of Representatives since December 2024. He represents the 79th district which contains the communities of Paris, Sumner, West Paris and Woodstock.
