= Arthur Mingo =

American politician

Member of the Maine House of Representatives from the 9th district
- Incumbent
- Assumed office December 3, 2024
- Preceded by: Anne C. Perry

Personal details
- Party: Republican
- Spouse: Angela
- Children: 3

Arthur Kevin Mingo is an American politician who has represented District 9 in the Maine House of Representatives since December 3, 2024.

== Political career ==
Mingo served as a city councilor in Calais, Maine for 18 years, and became mayor there in 2022. In 2024, he was elected to represent District 9 in the Maine House of Representatives.

== Electoral record ==
2024 Maine House District 9 General Election
Party	Candidate	Votes	%
Republican	Arthur Mingo	2,878	61.6%
Democratic	John Martin	1,791	38.4%
Total votes		4,669	100.0%
