= Holly Stover =

American politician (born 1960)

Member of the Maine House of Representatives from the 48th district
- Incumbent
- Assumed office December 7, 2022
- Preceded by: Melanie Sachs
- Succeeded by: Charlotte Nutt (elect)

Member of the Maine House of Representatives from the 89th district
- In office December 5, 2018 – December 7, 2022
- Preceded by: Stephanie Hawke
- Succeeded by: Adam R. Lee

Personal details
- Born: Holly Beth Stover; November 2, 1960 (age 66) Boothbay Harbor, Maine
- Party: Democratic
- Children: 1
- Education: Nasson College (BS); University of Southern Maine (BA)
- Profession: Nonprofit director

Holly Beth Stover (born November 2, 1960) is an American politician who has served as a member of the Maine House of Representatives since December 2018.

== Electoral history ==
Stover was elected in the 2018 Maine House of Representatives election to the 89th district. She was reelected in the 2020 Maine House of Representatives election. She was redistricted to the 48th district in the 2022 Maine House of Representatives election and was subsequently elected. She was reelected in the 2024 Maine House of Representatives election.

== Biography ==
Stover earned a bachelor's degrees from Nasson College and the University of Southern Maine.
