= Christina Mitchell =

American politician

Member of the Maine House of Representatives from the 110th district
- Incumbent
- Assumed office December 3, 2024
- Preceded by: Stephen Moriarty

Personal details
- Party: Democratic
- Website: mitchell.mainecandidate.com

Christina R.C. Mitchell is an American politician. She has served as a member of the Maine House of Representatives since December 2024. She represents the 110th district which contains the communities of Chebeague Island, Cumberland and Long Island. She was previously a councilwoman in Cumberland.
