= Michelle Boyer =

American politician

Member of the Maine House of Representatives from the 93rd district
- Incumbent
- Assumed office December 3, 2024
- Preceded by: Margaret Craven

Personal details
- Party: Democratic

Michelle Nicole Boyer is an American politician from Maine. She is a Democrat and represented District 93 in the Maine House of Representatives. She was first elected in 2024.

Boyer lives in Cape Elizabeth with her husband and two daughters.
