= Dani L. O'Halloran =

American politician

Member of the Maine House of Representatives from the 20th district
- Incumbent
- Assumed office December 3, 2024
- Preceded by: Kevin O'Connell

Personal details
- Party: Democratic
- Spouse: Dana Andrews
- Children: 2

Dani L. O'Halloran is an American politician serving as a Democratic member of the Maine House of Representatives for the 20th district. She graduated from the University of Maine. She is a realtor.
