= Flavia DeBrito =

American politician

Member of the Maine House of Representatives from the 64th district
- Incumbent
- Assumed office December 3, 2024
- Preceded by: Colleen Madigan

Personal details
- Party: Democratic
- Website: www.flaviaformaine.com

Flavia M. DeBrito is an American politician. She has served as a member of the Maine House of Representatives since December 2024. She represents the 64th district which is contains parts of Waterville and Winslow. She was previously a councilwoman in Waterville.
