= Mark Blier =

American politician

Member of the Maine House of Representatives from the 138th district
- Incumbent
- Assumed office December 7, 2022
- Preceded by: Robert Alley

Member of the Maine House of Representatives from the 22nd district
- In office December 2018 – December 7, 2022
- Preceded by: Jonathan Kinney
- Succeeded by: Laura Supica

Personal details
- Party: Republican
- Profession: Real estate agent

Mark Blier is an American politician who has served as a member of the Maine House of Representatives since December 2018.

== Electoral history ==
Blier was first elected to the 22nd district in the 2018 Maine House of Representatives election. He was reelected in the 2020 Maine House of Representatives election. Blier was redistricted to the 138th district in the 2022 Maine House of Representatives election.
