= Kristi Mathieson =

American politician

Member of the Maine House of Representatives
- Incumbent
- Assumed office December 7, 2022
- Preceded by: John L. Martin
- Constituency: 151st district
- In office December 2, 2020 – December 7, 2022
- Preceded by: Deane Rykerson
- Succeeded by: Austin Theriault
- Constituency: 1st district

Personal details
- Party: Democratic
- Education: University of New Hampshire (BA and MS)

Kristi Michele Mathieson is an American politician from Maine. She is the representative for Maine House District 151. She is on the Health Coverage, Insurance and Financial Services committee. Mathieson is also a registered dietitian.
