= Marygrace Cimino =

American politician

Member of the Maine House of Representatives from the 83rd district
- Incumbent
- Assumed office December 3, 2024
- Preceded by: Walter Riseman

Personal details
- Party: Republican
- Education: College of William & Mary

Marygrace Caroline Cimino is an American politician. She has served as a member of the Maine House of Representatives since December 2024.

Cimino has worked as a retail manager and graduated from the College of William & Mary.
