= Parnell Terry =

American politician

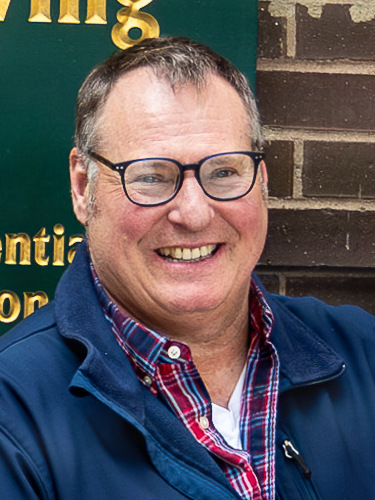

Member of the Maine House of Representatives from the 108th district
- Incumbent
- Assumed office December 3, 2024
- Preceded by: Maureen Terry

Personal details
- Party: Democratic
- Education: University of Maine

Parnell William Terry is an American politician. He has served as a member of the Maine House of Representatives since December 2024. He represents the 108th district which contains part of the town of Gorham, Maine. He previously worked for the Gorham School Department Facilities Maintenance Department for 16 years.
