= Tavis Hasenfus =

American attorney and politician

Member of the Maine House of Representatives from the 81st district
- Incumbent
- Assumed office December 2, 2020
- Preceded by: Craig Hickman

Personal details
- Born: Tavis Rock Hasenfus Augusta, Maine, U.S.
- Party: Democratic
- Spouse: Nicole Emery
- Children: 2
- Education: University of Maine (BA, JD)

Tavis Rock Hasenfus is an American attorney and politician serving as a member of the Maine House of Representatives from the 81st district. He assumed office on December 2, 2020.

== Early life and education ==
Hasenfus was born in Augusta, Maine and raised in Winthrop. After graduating from Winthrop High School in 2006. He earned a Bachelor of Arts degree in philosophy from the University of Maine and a Juris Doctor from the University of Maine School of Law.

== Career ==
Hasenfus served as an intern in the Kennebec County, Maine District Attorney's Office. He has since worked as an attorney at Levey, Wagley, Putman & Eccher. He was elected to the Maine House of Representatives in November 2020 and assumed office the following month. He is also a member of the Winthrop Lakes Region Chamber of Commerce and Winthrop Recreation Committee.
