= Steven D. Foster =

American politician

The Honorable

Member of the Maine House of Representatives from the 32nd district
- Incumbent
- Assumed office December 7, 2022
- Preceded by: Christopher Kessler

Member of the Maine House of Representatives from the 104th district
- In office December 2018 – December 7, 2022
- Preceded by: Raymond Wallace
- Succeeded by: Amy Arata

Personal details
- Party: Republican
- Spouse: Sharon
- Children: 3
- Profession: engineer

Steven D. Foster is an American politician who has served as a member of the Maine House of Representatives since December 2018.

== Electoral history ==
Foster was first elected in the 2018 Maine House of Representatives election to the 104th district. He was reelected in the 2020 Maine House of Representatives election. He was redistricted to the 32nd district in the 2022 Maine House of Representatives election.

== Biography ==
Foster earned a bachelor's degree in marine engineering from the Maine Maritime Academy in 1978 and an associate degree in pulp and paper technology from Kennebec Valley Community College in 2002. He is a Baptist.
