= Elizabeth Bosworth =

American politician

Member-elect of the Maine Senate from the 18th district
- Assuming office January 2027
- Succeeding: Rick Bennett

Personal details
- Party: Democratic

Elizabeth Bosworth is an American politician. A Democrat, she is the Senator-elect for the 18th district of the Maine Senate. Outside of politics, Bosworth formerly worked as a teacher.
