= Adam R. Lee =

American politician

Member of the Maine House of Representatives from the 89th district
- Incumbent
- Assumed office December 7, 2022
- Preceded by: Holly Stover

Personal details
- Party: Democratic
- Spouse: Heidi McCarthy
- Education: Bachelor of Arts in history, Juris Doctor cum laude
- Alma mater: Vermont Law and Graduate School, University of Texas at Austin
- Profession: Lawyer

Adam R. Lee is an American politician who has served as a member of the Maine House of Representatives since December 7, 2022. He represents Maine's 89th House district.

== Electoral history ==
He was elected on November 8, 2022, in the 2022 Maine House of Representatives election. He assumed office on December 7, 2022.

== Biography ==
Lee earned a Bachelor of Arts in history from the University of Texas at Austin in 2002 and a Juris Doctor cum laude from Vermont Law and Graduate School in 2007. He owns three cats.

Maine House of Representatives
Preceded by Holly Stover	Member of the Maine House of Representatives; 2023–present	Succeeded by incumbent
