= William Bridgeo =

American politician

Member of the Maine House of Representatives from the 60th district
- Incumbent
- Assumed office December 7, 2022
- Preceded by: Kristen Cloutier

Personal details
- Born: January 17, 1950 (age 76) Aroostook County, Maine
- Party: Democratic
- Spouse: Janice Church Bridgeo
- Children: 2
- Education: bachelor's degree, Master of Public Administration

William "Bill" Bridgeo is an American politician who has served as a member of the Maine House of Representatives since December 7, 2022. He represents Maine's 60th House district.

== Electoral history ==
He was elected on November 8, 2022, in the 2022 Maine House of Representatives election against Republican opponent William Clardy. He assumed office on December 7, 2022. He was city manager of Augusta, Maine between 1998 and 2021. He was re-elected in 2024.

== Biography ==
Bridgeo earned a bachelor's degree in political science from St. Michael's College in Vermont, and a Master of Public Administration from the University of Hartford in 1979. He also teaches at University of Maine at Augusta.

Bridgeo initially endorsed independent State Senator Rick Bennett for Governor of Maine in the 2026 election. Bennett had previously been a Republican prior to his campaign. In October, Bridgeo switched his support to Democratic nominee Hannah Pingree.

Maine House of Representatives
Preceded by Kristen Cloutier	Member of the Maine House of Representatives; 2022–present	Succeeded by incumbent
