= Laurie Osher =

American politician (born 1960)

Member of the Maine House of Representatives
- Incumbent
- Assumed office December 7, 2022
- Preceded by: Patrick Corey
- Constituency: 25th district
- In office December 2, 2020 – December 7, 2022
- Preceded by: Ryan Tipping
- Constituency: 123rd district

Personal details
- Born: June 8, 1960 (age 66) Philadelphia, Pennsylvania, U.S.
- Party: Democratic
- Education: Cornell University (BS); North Carolina State University (MS); University of California, Berkeley (PhD)

Laurie Osher (born June 8, 1960) is an American politician, who was elected to the Maine House of Representatives in 2020. She will represent the 123rd House District as a member of the Maine Democratic Party.

Prior to her election to the state legislature, Osher served on the town council of Orono.

Osher moved to Maine in 1999 to join the faculty at the University of Maine.
