= Paul Flynn (American politician) =

American politician

Member of the Maine House of Representatives from the 63rd district
- Incumbent
- Assumed office December 3, 2024
- Preceded by: Scott Cyrway

Personal details
- Party: Republican
- Website: www.flynnforme.com

Paul R. Flynn is an American politician. He has served as a member of the Maine House of Representatives since December 2024.
