= Julia McCabe =

American politician

Julia A. G. McCabe is an American politician from Maine. She is a Democrat and represented District 93 in the Maine House of Representatives. She was elected in 2024.

McCabe holds a bachelor's degree from Bates College and a master's degree in government from Johns Hopkins University. She is a schoolteacher by profession.
