= Matthew D. Beck =

American politician

Member of the Maine House of Representatives from the 122nd district
- Incumbent
- Assumed office March 6, 2024
- Preceded by: Lois Galgay Reckitt

Personal details
- Party: Democratic
- Spouse: Denise
- Children: 2
- Education: SUNY Binghamton (BA)

Matthew D. Beck is an American trade unionist and politician. He serves as a Democratic member for the 122nd district of the Maine House of Representatives.

Beck spent nearly 17 years as a staff organizer and business manager for International Brotherhood of Electrical Workers 1837, which represents electrical workers in Maine and New Hampshire.
