= Tiffany Strout =

American politician

Member of the Maine House of Representatives from the 11th district
- Incumbent
- Assumed office December 7, 2022
- Preceded by: Ryan Fecteau

Personal details
- Party: Republican
- Spouse: Zac
- Children: Konner
- Education: associate degree
- Alma mater: University of Maine at Augusta
- Profession: Event planner

Tiffany Strout is an American politician who has served as a member of the Maine House of Representatives since December 7, 2022. She represents Maine's 11th House district. She has also worked in MSAD 37.

== Electoral history ==
She was elected on November 8, 2022, in the 2022 Maine House of Representatives election against Democratic opponent Roland Rogers. She assumed office on December 7, 2022.

== Biography ==
Strout earned an associate degree from the University of Maine at Augusta in 2000.

Maine House of Representatives
Preceded by Ryan Fecteau	Member of the Maine House of Representatives; 2022–present	Succeeded by incumbent
