= James Lee White =

American politician

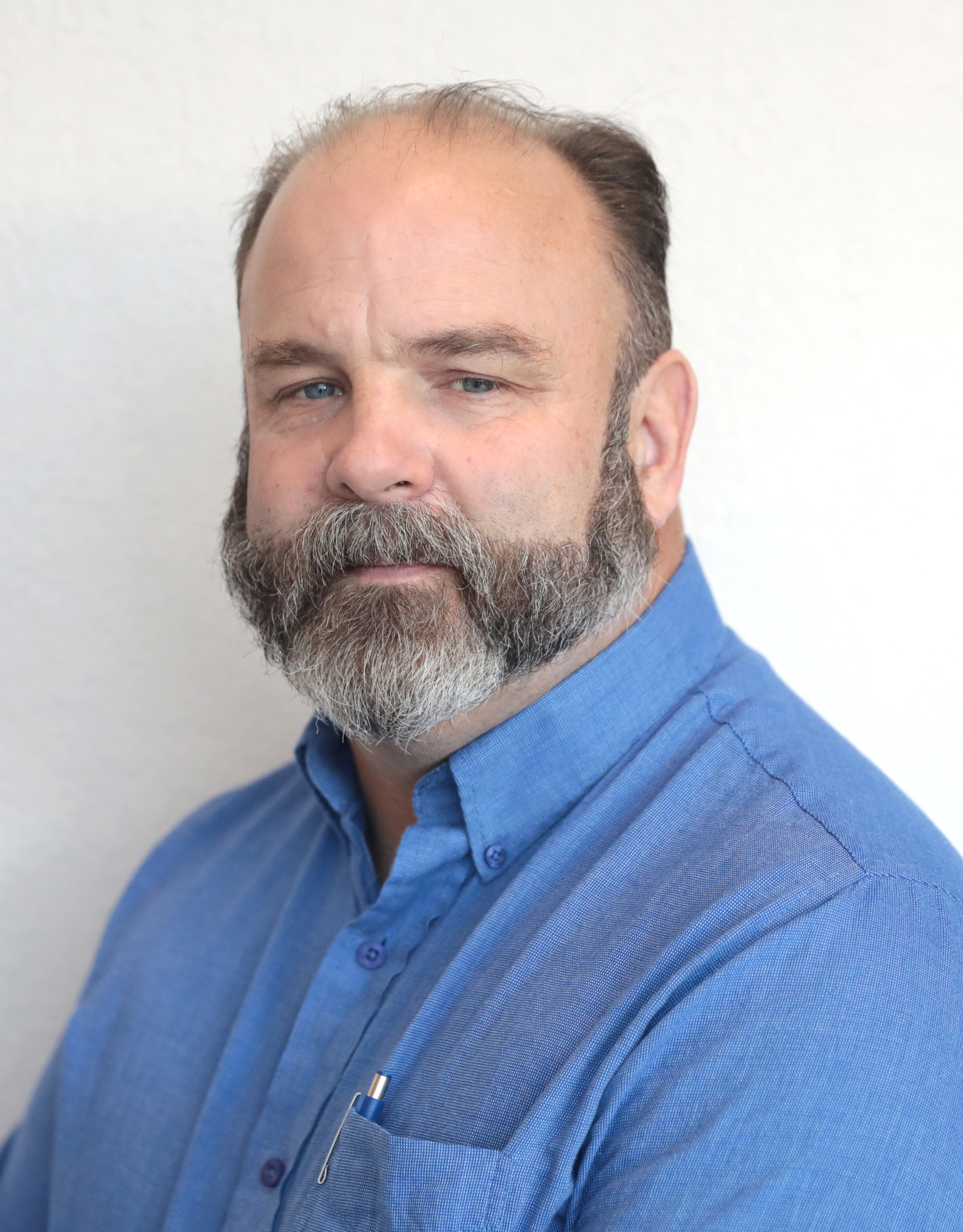

Member of the Maine House of Representatives from the 30th district
- Incumbent
- Assumed office December 7, 2022
- Preceded by: Rebecca Millett

Personal details
- Party: Republican
- Spouse: Tricia
- Children: 3
- Profession: Gunsmith

James Lee "Jim" White is an American politician who has served as a member of the Maine House of Representatives since December 7, 2022. He represents Maine's 30th House district.

== Electoral history ==
He was elected on November 8, 2022, in the 2022 Maine House of Representatives election. He assumed office on December 7, 2022.

== Biography ==
He graduated from Epping High School in New Hampshire in 1986. He served in the United States Navy from 1986 to 1993, as an engineer. He lives in Guilford, Maine, and is a gunsmith. He is married, with three children, and three grandchildren.

Maine House of Representatives
Preceded by Rebecca Millett	Member of the Maine House of Representatives; 2022–present	Succeeded by incumbent
