= Kilton Webb =

American politician

Kilton M. Webb is an electrician and Democratic politician from Maine who was elected in 2024 to represent District 98 of the Maine House of Representatives (encompassing part or all of Bowdoin, Durham, Pownal, Topsham, and Lisbon in Androscoggin County). He is an active member of the International Brotherhood of Electrical Workers.

He won over perennial Republican candidate Guy Lebida by only 55 votes (2,996 votes to Lebida’s 2,941 votes). Lebida had defeated incumbent Joseph Galletta (who had reportedly been absent the most out of any member of the House, being absent 67% of days the legislature convened) in the June 2024 Republican primary.
