= Michael Lemelin =

American politician

Michael Lemlin

Member of the Maine House of Representatives from the 88th district
- Incumbent
- Assumed office December 2, 2020
- Preceded by: Chloe Maxmin

Personal details
- Born: Biddeford, Maine, U.S.
- Party: Republican
- Children: 3
- Education: Boston University (BS)

Michael H. Lemelin is an American politician who is currently serving as a member of the Maine House of Representatives for the 88th district. He assumed office on December 2, 2020.

== Early life and education ==
Lemelin was born in Biddeford, Maine, and graduated from Brunswick High School. He earned a Bachelor of Science degree in aerospace engineering from Boston University.

== Career ==
From 1989 to 1996, Lemelin worked as a commercial and private pilot. He later worked in the restaurant industry, operating several Subway and Red Robin franchises around Augusta, Maine. Lemelin also owned as gym called Curves in Gardiner and manages his wife's chiropractic practice. He was an unsuccessful candidate for the Maine House of Representatives in 2018. He was elected to the House in 2020.

In April 2024, Lemelin attracted controversy for his claim that the 2023 mass shooting in Lewiston, Maine was an act of divine intervention resulting from Maine’s recent expansion of abortion rights, stating “God heard you, and the horrible events on Oct. 25 happened”. He was censured by the House as a result.
