= Gregory Swallow =

American politician

Member of the Maine House of Representatives from the 7th district
- Incumbent
- Assumed office December 7, 2022
- Succeeded by: Jantzen Craine (elect)

Member of the Maine House of Representatives from the 114th district
- In office December 2018 – December 2, 2020
- Succeeded by: Tracy Quint

Personal details
- Party: Republican
- Spouse: Kristy
- Education: Bachelor of Arts
- Alma mater: University of Maine

Gregory Swallow is an American politician who has served as a member of the Maine House of Representatives since December 7, 2022. He represents Maine's 7th House district. Before entering politics, he worked as an insurance marketer.

== Electoral history ==
Swallow was elected to the 114th district in the 2018 Maine House of Representatives election. He won the Republican primary but was replaced by Tracy Quint in the general election. He was redistricted to the 7th district and elected in the 2022 Maine House of Representatives election.

== Biography ==
Swallow earned a Bachelor of Arts in economics from the University of Maine in 1981.
