= Sharon Frost =

American politician

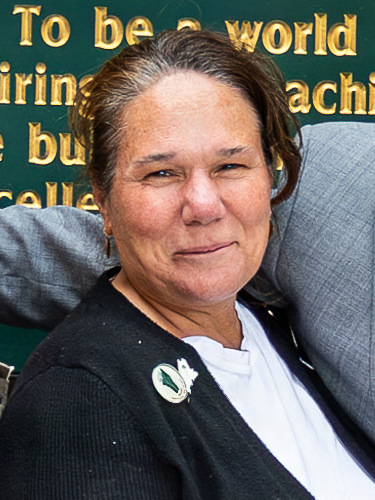

Member of the Maine House of Representatives from the 58th district
- Incumbent
- Assumed office December 3, 2024
- Preceded by: Daniel J. Newman

Personal details
- Party: Independent

Sharon C. Frost is an American politician. She has served as a member of the Maine House of Representatives since December 2024. She is a former educator.
