= Anne P. Graham =

American politician

Member of the Maine House of Representatives from the 105th district
- Incumbent
- Assumed office December 7, 2022
- Preceded by: Joel Stetkis

Member of the Maine House of Representatives from the 109th district
- In office December 2010 – 2014

Personal details
- Party: Democratic
- Children: 3
- Education: Bachelor of Science, Master of Science
- Alma mater: Boston College, Yale University
- Profession: Pediatric nurse practitioner

Anne P. Graham is an American politician who served as a member of the Maine House of Representatives from 2010 to 2014, and since December 7, 2022. She currently represents Maine's 105th House district.

== Biography ==
Graham earned a Bachelor of Science from Boston College in 1981 and a Master of Science from Yale University in 1986. She is a Roman Catholic.

== Electoral history ==
Graham was first elected to the 109th district in the 2010 Maine House of Representatives election. She was reelected in the 2012 Maine House of Representatives election. She was reelected in the 2014 Maine House of Representatives election. She did not seek reelection until the 2022 Maine House of Representatives election, where she was redistricted into the 105th district.
