= Joshua Morris =

American politician

Member of the Maine House of Representatives from the 91st district
- Incumbent
- Assumed office December 2022
- Preceded by: Jeffrey Evangelos

Member of the Maine House of Representatives from the 75th district
- In office 2018 – December 2022
- Preceded by: Jeff Timberlake
- Succeeded by: H. Scott Landry

Personal details
- Party: Republican
- Education: University of Southern Maine

Joshua Morris is an American realtor and politician who has represented the 75th district in the Maine House of Representatives since 2018. He is a Republican. He is on the Health Coverage, Insurance and Financial Services committee. He is also a realtor.

== Electoral history ==
Morris was elected to the 75th district in the 2018 Maine House of Representatives election. He was reelected in the 2020 Maine House of Representatives election. He was redistricted to the 91st district and elected to it in the 2022 Maine House of Representatives election.

== Biography ==
Morris graduated from Leavitt Area High School and the University of Southern Maine, where he earned a degree in Political Science.
