= Ann Fredericks =

American politician

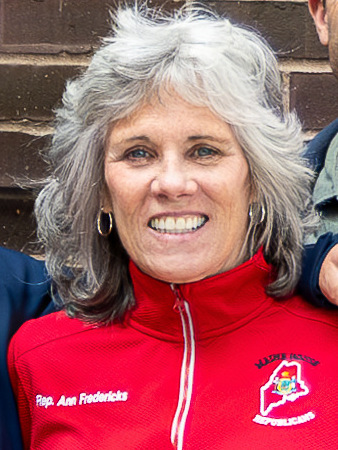

Member of the Maine House of Representatives from the 143rd district
- Incumbent
- Assumed office December 7, 2022
- Preceded by: Peggy Stanley

Personal details
- Party: Republican
- Education: Bachelor's degree, Master's degree
- Profession: Nurse

Ann Fredericks is an American politician who has served as a member of the Maine House of Representatives since December 7, 2022. She represents Maine's 143rd House district.

== Electoral history ==
She was elected on November 8, 2022, in the 2022 Maine House of Representatives election and assumed office on December 7, 2022.

Maine House of Representatives
| Preceded by Peggy Stanley | Member of the Maine House of Representatives; 2022–present | Succeeded by incumbent |
