= Caldwell Jackson =

American politician

Member of the Maine House of Representatives from the 80th district
- Incumbent
- Assumed office December 7, 2022
- Preceded by: Richard Bradstreet

Personal details
- Party: Republican
- Spouse: Diane
- Children: 3
- Profession: Farmer

Caldwell Jackson is an American politician who has served as a member of the Maine House of Representatives since December 7, 2022. He represents Maine's 80th House district.

== Electoral history ==
He was elected on November 8, 2022, in the 2022 Maine House of Representatives election. He assumed office on December 7, 2022.

Maine House of Representatives
Preceded by Richard Bradstreet	Member of the Maine House of Representatives; 2022–present	Succeeded by incumbent
