= Laura Supica =

American politician

Member of the Maine House of Representatives from the 22nd district
- Incumbent
- Assumed office December 7, 2022
- Preceded by: Mark Blier

Member of the Maine House of Representatives from the 126th district
- In office December 2020 – December 7, 2022
- Preceded by: Drew Gattine
- Succeeded by: John Schneck

Personal details
- Born: California
- Party: Democratic
- Spouse: Chris
- Website: https://laurasupica.mainecandidate.com

Laura Supica is an American politician who has served as a member of the Maine House of Representatives since December 2020. She currently represents Maine's 22nd House district. She previously worked as an assistant to the Secretary of State of Maine.

== Electoral history ==
She was elected to the 126th district in the 2020 Maine House of Representatives election. She was redistricted to the 22nd district and was elected to it in the 2022 Maine House of Representatives election. She has also been a member of the Bangor city council.
