= Rolf Olsen (American politician) =

American politician

Member of the Maine House of Representatives from the 86th district
- Incumbent
- Assumed office December 3, 2024
- Preceded by: Jessica Fay

Personal details
- Born: 1955 or 1956 (age 70)
- Party: Republican
- Children: 2
- Education: University of Maine
- Profession: Insurance Agent

Rolf A. Olsen, Jr. is an American politician who has represented District 86 in the Maine House of Representatives since December 3, 2024.

== Political career ==
Olsen served on the Budget Committee of Raymond, Maine for 29 years, and on the Select Board for eight years. In 2024, he was elected to represent District 86 in the Maine House of Representatives.

== Electoral record ==
2024 Maine House District 9 General Election
Party	Candidate	Votes	%
Republican	Rolf Olsen Jr.	2,912	52.0%
Democratic	Craig Messinger	2,685	48.0%
Total votes		5,597	100.0%
