= Steven Bishop (politician) =

American politician

Member of the Maine House of Representatives from the 17th district
- Incumbent
- Assumed office December 3, 2024
- Preceded by: Ronald B. Russell

Personal details
- Party: Republican
- Website: bishopforus.com

Steven M. Bishop is an American politician. He has served as a member of the Maine House of Representatives since December 2024.
