= Gary Friedmann =

American politician

Member of the Maine House of Representatives from the 14th district
- Incumbent
- Assumed office December 3, 2024
- Preceded by: Lynne Williams

Personal details
- Party: Democratic

Gary Friedmann is an American politician serving as a member of the Maine House of Representatives. A member of the Democratic Party, he represents District 14, comprising Bar Harbor, Lamoine, Mount Desert, and Cranberry Isles. Prior to representing in the Maine House of Representatives, Friedmann served on the Bar Harbor Town Council.

== Career ==
Friedmann served on the Bar Harbor Town Council for four three-year terms before running in the 2024 Maine House of Representatives election. Friedmann co-founded the lobbying group Our Power, which called for a return of Maine's power grid to local control, environmental lobbying groups Maine Climate Action Now and A Climate to Thrive, and campaign finance reform organization Maine Citizens for Clean Elections.

Friedmann was elected to District 14, comprising Bar Harbor, Lamoine, Mount Desert, and Cranberry Isles, in November 2024, defeating Republican Party candidate Sandra Gray with 67.8% of the vote (4,170). The seat had been vacant as Lynne Williams, the previous representative in this district, resigned from the position after accepting a job as a workers' compensation mediator for the Maine government.

In February 2025, Friedmann proposed a bill to permit municipalities to impose a 2% sales tax on short-term lodging, if approved by referendum, to fund affordable housing. The measure failed to pass.
