= Richard H. Campbell =

American politician

Member of the Maine House of Representatives from the 19th district
- Incumbent
- Assumed office December 7, 2022
- Preceded by: Matthew Harrington

Member of the Maine House of Representatives from the 130th district
- In office December 2014 – December 2020
- Succeeded by: Kathy Downes

Member of the Maine House of Representatives from the 40th district
- In office December 2012 – December 2014

Personal details
- Party: Republican

Richard H. Campbell is an American politician who has served as a member of the Maine House of Representatives since December 7, 2022.

== Electoral history ==
He was first elected to the 40th district in the 2012 Maine House of Representatives election. He was redistricted to the 130th district and was elected in the 2014 Maine House of Representatives election. He was reelected in the 2016 Maine House of Representatives election, 2018 Maine House of Representatives election, and the 2020 Maine House of Representatives election. In the 2022 Maine House of Representatives election he was redistricted to the 19th district.

== Biography ==
Campbell graduated from Brewer High School. He also served in the Maine Air National Guard during the Vietnam War. He is a congregationalist.
