= Lynn Copeland =

American politician

Lynn H. Copeland

Member of the Maine House of Representatives
- In office December 2, 2020 – December 7, 2022
- Preceded by: Donna Bailey
- Succeeded by: Lynne Williams
- Constituency: 14th district
- Incumbent
- Assumed office December 7, 2022
- Preceded by: Kathy Downes
- Constituency: 130th district

Personal details
- Born: 1960 (age 65–66) Huntington, New York, U.S.
- Party: Democratic
- Spouse: Gregory

Lynn Copeland (born 1960 in Huntington, New York) is a state representative in the Maine House of Representatives, representing the 130th district.

== Political career ==
Copeland was elected to the Maine House of Representatives in 2020. She is a member of the Democratic Party. She was redistricted into the 130th district and was elected in the 2022 Maine House of Representatives election. She previously served on the Saco City Council as the member for Ward 4.

2021-2022 Maine House Committee Assignments

- State and Local Government Committee
