= Roger Albert =

American politician

Member of the Maine House of Representatives from the 2nd district
- Incumbent
- Assumed office December 7, 2022
- Preceded by: Michele Meyer

Personal details
- Party: Republican
- Spouse: Jacqueline
- Children: 3
- Profession: Retired construction worker

Roger Albert is an American politician who has served as a member of the Maine House of Representatives since December 7, 2022. He represents Maine's 2nd House district. A member of the Republican Party, his district includes several municipalities in Aroostook County, including Madawaska, Frenchville, and Van Buren.

== Electoral history ==
Albert was elected to represent Maine's 2nd congressional district on November 8, 2022, in the 2022 Maine House of Representatives election. He assumed office on December 7, 2022 and was reelected in the 2024 Maine House of Representatives election. He serves on the Transportation Committee.

== Biography ==
Albert resides in Madawaska, Maine. He is married and has three children. He is a retired constructed worker. Albert served in the Maine Army National Guard.

Maine House of Representatives
Preceded by Michele Meyer	Member of the Maine House of Representatives; 2022–present	Succeeded by incumbent
