= Tammy Schmersal-Burgess =

American politician

Tammy Schmersal-Burgess is an American politician who has served as a member of the Maine House of Representatives since December 7, 2022. She represents Maine's 77th House district.
