= Shelley Rudnicki =

American politician (born 1966)

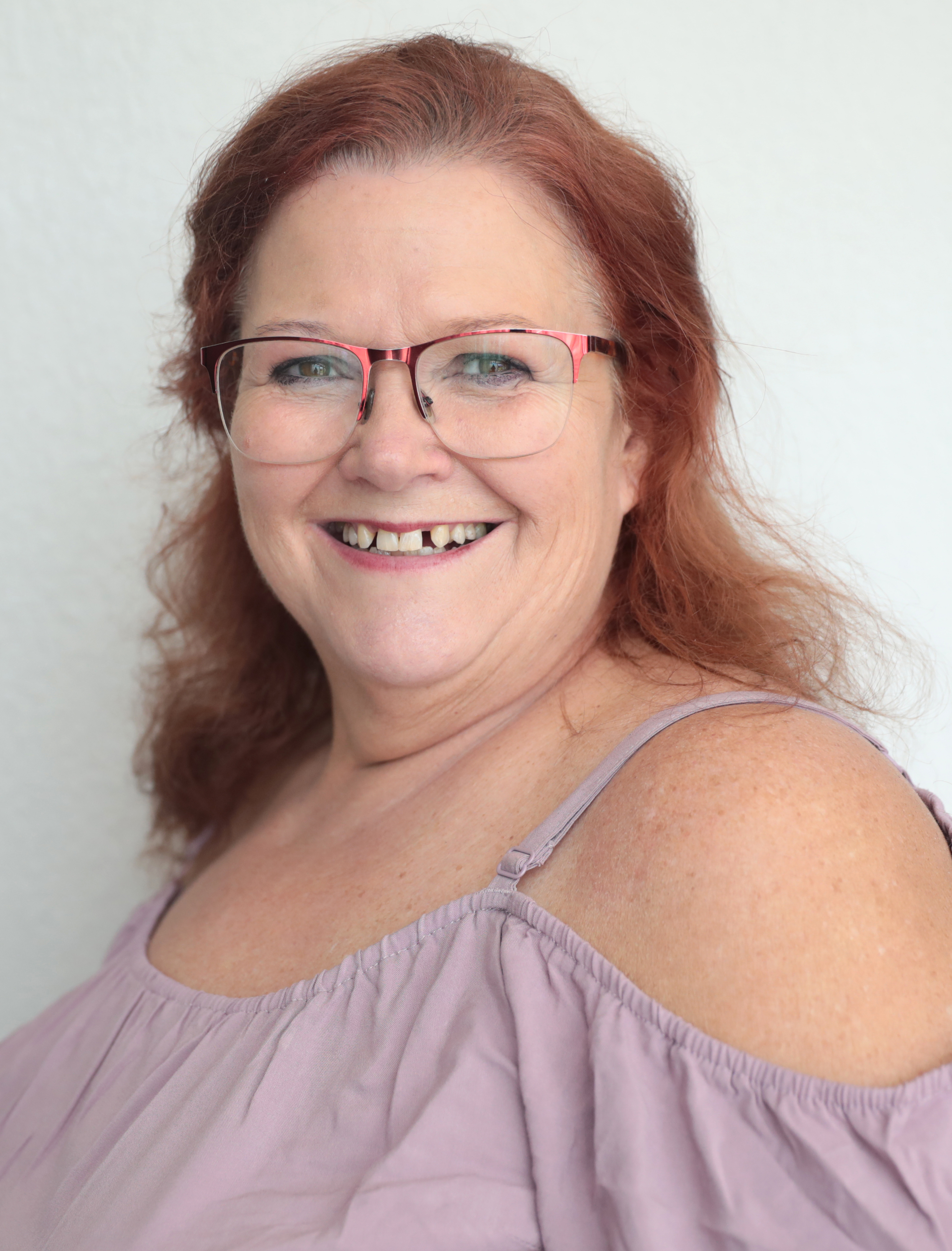
- Rudnicki in 2022

Member of the Maine House of Representatives from the 67th district
- Incumbent
- Assumed office December 7, 2022
- Preceded by: Susan Austin

Personal details
- Born: 2 September 1966 (age 59) Bangor, Maine, United States
- Party: Republican
- Spouse: Anthony Rudnicki
- Children: Anthony Rudnicki II, Shelby Rudnicki
- Profession: Business owner

Shelley J. Rudnicki (born 2 September 1966) is an American politician who has served as a member of the Maine House of Representatives since December 2019. A Republican, she represents Maine's 67th House district.

Rudnicki graduated from Ashford University. She was previously Chairwoman of the School Board of Lawrence High School in Fairfield, Maine.
