= Kathy Javner =

American politician (1973–2026)

Member of the Maine House of Representatives
- In office December 7, 2022 – January 10, 2026
- Preceded by: Sophia Warren
- Succeeded by: Nancy Theriault
- Constituency: 29th district
- In office December 5, 2018 – December 7, 2022
- Preceded by: Beth Turner
- Succeeded by: Lucas Lanigan
- Constituency: 141st district

Personal details
- Born: Kathy Irene Javner; 1973 Chester, Maine, U.S.
- Died: January 10, 2026 (aged 52)
- Party: Republican
- Children: 3
- Education: Bethany Global University

Kathy Irene Javner (1973 – January 10, 2026) was an American politician who served as a member of the Maine House of Representatives from the 141st district. Elected in November 2018, she assumed office on December 5, 2018. She died during her final term in office on January 10, 2026.

== Early life and education ==
Javner was born and raised in Chester, Maine. She graduated from Bethany Global University.

== Career ==
Javner was elected to the Maine House of Representatives in November 2018 and assumed office on December 5, 2018. Beginning in 2019, she was a member of the House Health and Human Services Committee.

== Death ==
Javner died from breast cancer on January 10, 2026, at the age of 52.
