= Scott Harriman =

Member of the Maine House of Representatives

Member of the Maine House of Representatives from the 94th District
- Incumbent
- Assumed office February 25, 2026
- Preceded by: Kristen Cloutier

Lewiston City Councilor for Ward 3
- Incumbent
- Assumed office January 3, 2022

Personal details
- Born: 1986 or 1987 (age 39–40)
- Party: Democratic

Scott A. Harriman (born 1986 or 1987) is an American politician and member of the Maine House of Representatives. He serves on the Joint Standing Committee On Taxation.

Harriman is also a member of the Lewiston City Council, representing Ward 3. He has served on the Lewiston Public Art Committee, Complete Streets Committee, Housing Committee, L/A Transit Committee, and the Mayoral Ad Hoc Shelter Committee and as Council President.

In October 2025, Harriman, alongside fellow City Councilor Joshua Nagine, was unanimously censured by his colleagues on the City Council for using Signal, an encrypted messaging service, to discuss "city matters" with a Lewiston police officer. The messages were set to automatically delete after a set amount of time (a privacy feature of Signal), which violated Maine's Freedom of Access Act, which requires communications by elected officials to be retained. Harriman stated he did not know the messages were set to automatically delete, and apologized for the incident. No further action was taken against him or Nagine.

On February 24, 2026, Harriman won a special election for the 94th district in the Maine House of Representatives, defeating Republican candidate Janet Beaudoin. The election result was a notable Democratic underperformance.

Harriman was censured by his Lewiston City Council colleagues for a third time, by a 4-3 vote, on June 2, 2026, for alleged uncivil behavior.
