= Jeffrey S. Adams =

American politician

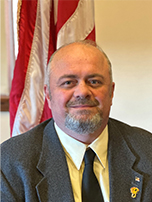

Member of the Maine House of Representatives from the 144th district
- Incumbent
- Assumed office December 7, 2022
- Preceded by: Tracy Quint (redistricting)

Personal details
- Party: Republican

Jeffrey Sean Adams is an American politician who has served as a member of the Maine House of Representatives since December 7, 2022. He represents Maine's 144th House district.
