= Samuel Zager =

American politician

Sam Zager

Member of the Maine House of Representatives

Member of the Maine House of Representatives 116th district
- Incumbent
- Assumed office December 7, 2022
- Preceded by: Richard Pickett
- In office December 2, 2020 – December 7, 2022
- Preceded by: Erik Jorgensen
- Succeeded by: Victoria Doudera
- Constituency: 41st district

Personal details
- Born: Samuel Lewis Zager Subic Bay, Philippines
- Party: Democratic
- Education: United States Naval Academy (BS); University College, Oxford (MPhil); Harvard University (MD)

Military service
- Branch/service: United States Navy
- Battles/wars: War in Afghanistan

Samuel Lewis Zager is an American politician and physician serving as a member of the Maine House of Representatives from the 41st district, which is part of the city of Portland. Elected in November 2020, he assumed office on December 2, 2020.

== Early life and education ==
Zager was born in Subic Bay, Philippines. He graduated from Rumson-Fair Haven High School in 1993. He attended Brookdale Community College,while still in high School. He earned a Bachelor of Science in naval history from the United States Naval Academy. He later earned a Master of Philosophy from University College, Oxford. After completing pre-med courses at the University of Washington Medical Center, he earned a Doctor of Medicine from Harvard Medical School.

== Career ==
Zager served as an intelligence officer in the United States Navy from 1998 to 2004. During his medical studies, Zager completed a residency in family medicine at the Maine Medical Center. He later became a family physician at Martin's Point Health Care. He has also worked as a medical volunteer at the Deering High School-Based Health Center and a professor at the Tufts University School of Medicine. Zager was elected to the Maine House of Representatives in November 2020 and assumed office on December 2, 2020.
