= Walter Runte =

American politician

Walter Gerard "Gerry" Runte Jr.

Member of the Maine House of Representatives from the 146th district
- Incumbent
- Assumed office December 7, 2022
- Preceded by: Patty Hymanson

Personal details
- Born: November 3, 1949 (age 76) Ft. Benning, Georgia
- Party: Democratic
- Spouse: Michelle
- Children: 4
- Education: Bachelor's degree in General Science, master's degree in nuclear engineering
- Alma mater: Pennsylvania State University

Walter "Gerry" Runte Jr. is an American politician who has served as a member of the Maine House of Representatives since December 7, 2022. He represents Maine's 146th House district.

== Electoral history ==
He was elected on November 8, 2022, in the 2022 Maine House of Representatives election against Republican opponent Bradley Moulton. He assumed office on December 7, 2022. He was reelected in the November 2024 general election.

== Biography ==
Walter Gerard "Gerry" Runte Jr.' is an American energy executive, consultant, and politician serving as a member of the Maine House of Representatives from the 146th district since 2022. A Democrat, he represents parts of York County, including Ogunquit, Wells, and York. He serves on the Legislature’s Energy, Utilities and Technology Committee.

== Early life and education ==
Runte was born in Ft. Benning, GA. He attended Pennsylvania State University, earning an undergraduate degree in science and a master's degree in nuclear engineering in 1976. He also served in the United States Army.

== Career ==
Runte spent more than four decades in the energy and utility sectors, working in electric utilities, clean energy development, fuel cells, hydrogen technologies, and energy infrastructure strategy. According to his LinkedIn profile, his career was divided between the traditional utility industry and emerging clean-energy technologies.

During his career, Runte held executive and senior management positions with several energy and technology firms, including ARES Corporation, where he served in clean-energy and strategic development roles; Gas Technology Institute; Mosaic Energy; and M-C Power Corporation. He later became principal of Worthington Sawtelle, an energy consulting and strategic advisory firm focused on utility modernization, distributed energy resources, and energy policy.

Prior to his election to the Legislature, Runte was active in local government and energy planning in York, Maine. He served on the York Energy Steering Committee and Planning Board and chaired the town’s Climate Action Plan Steering Committee.

== Political career ==
Runte was elected to the Maine House of Representatives in the 2022 election, defeating Republican candidate Bradley Moulton. He took office on December 7, 2022.

In the Legislature, Runte has focused primarily on energy policy, utility regulation, grid modernization, renewable energy financing, and integrated electric-system planning. He has been involved in debates concerning community solar policy, transmission planning, distributed energy resources, and large-load electricity consumers such as data centers.

== Personal life ==
Runte resides in York with his wife, Michelle. They have four children.

Maine House of Representatives
Preceded by Patty Hymanson	Member of the Maine House of Representatives; 2022–present	Succeeded by incumbent
