= William Tuell =

American politician

William R. Tuell

Member of the Maine House of Representatives from the 10th district
- Incumbent
- Assumed office December 4, 2024
- Preceded by: Kenneth Davis Jr.

Member of the Maine House of Representatives from the 139th district
- In office December 3, 2014 – December 7, 2022
- Preceded by: Aaron Libby
- Succeeded by: David Woodsome

Personal details
- Party: Republican
- Education: University of Maine, Machias (BA)

William R. Tuell is an American politician from East Machias, Maine who has been serving as a member of the Maine House of Representatives since 2024. He had previously served as representative from 2014 to 2022. He has a BA in History from the University of Maine at Machias.

Tuell was a candidate in the 2024 Maine House of Representatives election in District 10. He won the general election in November.
