= Stephan Bunker =

American politician

Member of the Maine House of Representatives from the 75th district
- Incumbent
- Assumed office December 3, 2024
- Preceded by: H. Scott Landry

Personal details
- Party: Democratic

Stephan M. Bunker is an American politician. He has served as a member of the Maine House of Representatives since December 2024. He represents the 75th district which contains the communities of Chesterville and Farmington. Until 2024, he was a selectman in Farmington. He previously worked as a firefighter.
