= Mathew McIntyre =

American politician

Member of the Maine House of Representatives from the 18th district
- Incumbent
- Assumed office December 3, 2024
- Preceded by: Meldon Carmichael

Personal details
- Party: Republican
- Education: Excelsior University

Mathew David McIntyre is an American politician. He has served as a member of the Maine House of Representatives since December 2024.

McIntyre served in the U.S. Navy for seven years before being honorably discharged in 1998.
