= Alicia Collins =

American politician

Member of the Maine House of Representatives from the 61st district
- Incumbent
- Assumed office December 3, 2024
- Preceded by: Richard Bradstreet

Personal details
- Party: Republican

Alicia Carol Collins is an American politician. She has served as a member of the Maine House of Representatives since December 2024.
