= Mark Walker (Maine politician) =

American politician

Member of the Maine House of Representatives from the 84th district
- Incumbent
- Assumed office December 7, 2022
- Preceded by: Charlotte Warren

Commissioner of the Maine Human Rights Commission
- Incumbent
- Assumed office August 2022

Personal details
- Born: Fryeburg, Maine, U.S.
- Party: Republican
- Spouse: Priscilla
- Children: 4
- Profession: Business owner

Mark Walker is an American politician who has served as a member of the Maine House of Representatives since December 7, 2022. He represents Maine's 84th House district. He also works with PragerU. He was appointed to the Maine Human Rights Commission by Janet Mills in August 2022.

== Electoral history ==
He was elected on November 8, 2022, in the 2022 Maine House of Representatives election against Democratic opponent Barry Powers. He assumed office on December 7, 2022. He has served as mayor of Hallowell and on its city council.

== Biography ==
Walker earned a Master of Business Administration in 2006.

Maine House of Representatives
Preceded by Charlotte Warren	Member of the Maine House of Representatives; 2022–present	Succeeded by incumbent
