= Aaron M. Dana =

Passamaquoddy politician

Member of the Maine House of Representatives from Passamaquoddy Tribe
- Incumbent
- Assumed office December 7, 2022
- Preceded by: Rena Newell

Personal details
- Party: Independent

Aaron M. Dana is a Passamaquoddy politician. He serves as a tribal member of the Maine House of Representatives.
