= Benjamin C. Hymes =

American politician

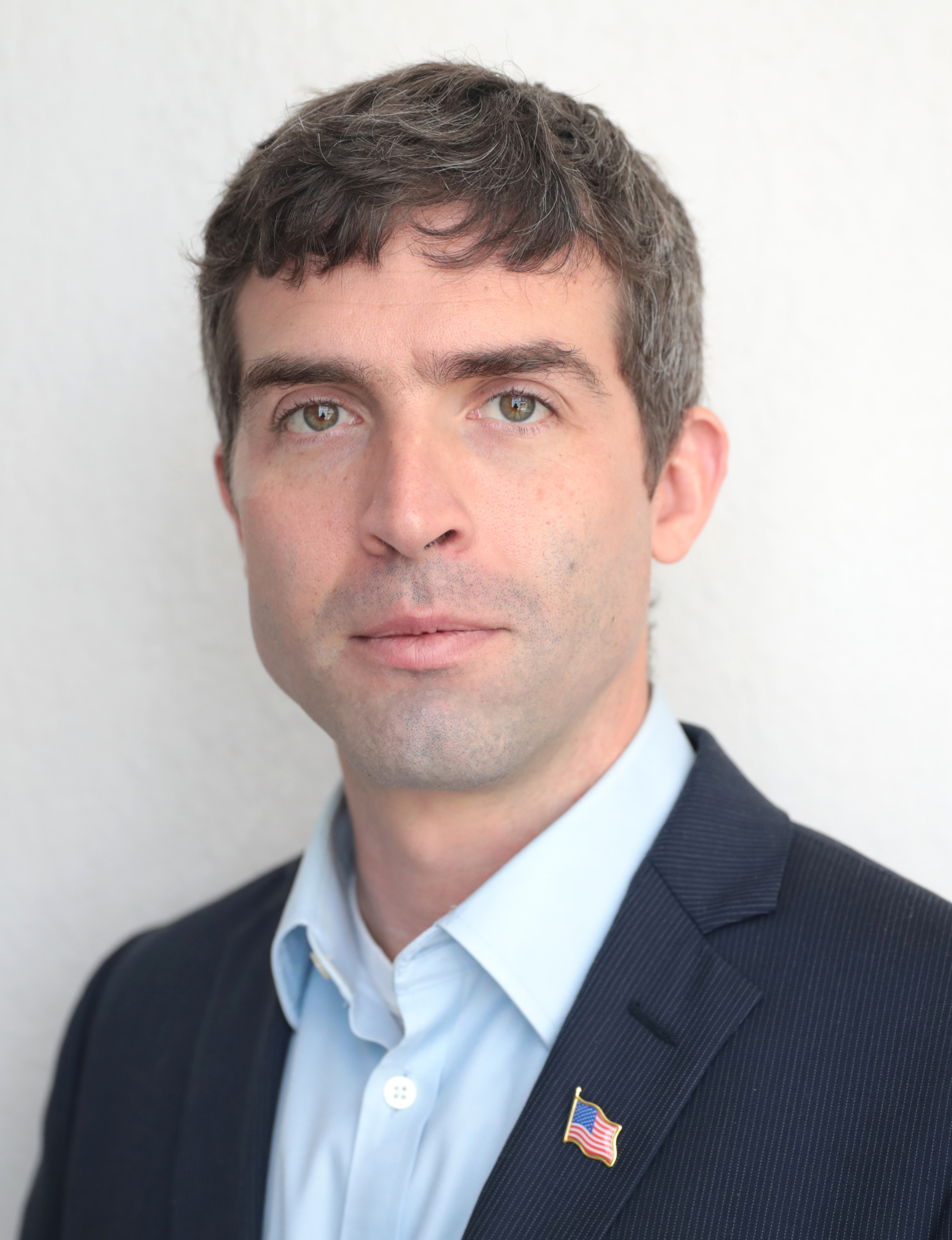
- Hymes in 2022

Member of the Maine House of Representatives from the 38th district
- Incumbent
- Assumed office December 7, 2022

Personal details
- Party: Republican

Benjamin C. Hymes is an American politician and small business owner. He serves as a Republican member for the 38th district of the Maine House of Representatives. He has served 20 years in the Navy.
