= Brian Reynolds (politician) =

Maliseet politician

Member of the Maine House of Representatives from the Houlton Band of Maliseet Indians
- Incumbent
- Assumed office May 14, 2025
- Preceded by: Henry John Bear (Note: The Houlton Band of Maliseet Indians did not elect to send a member to the Maine House of Representatives in 2018; from 2018 until 2025, when Reynolds was sworn in, the seat was vacant.)

Personal details
- Born: 1968 or 1969 (age 57–58)
- Party: Independent

Brian Reynolds (born 1968 or 1969) is a Maliseet politician. He is the non-voting representative for the Houlton Band of Maliseet Indians in the Maine House of Representatives. He is also the Tribal Administrator for the Houlton Band of Maliseet Indians.
