= Katrina Smith =

American politician

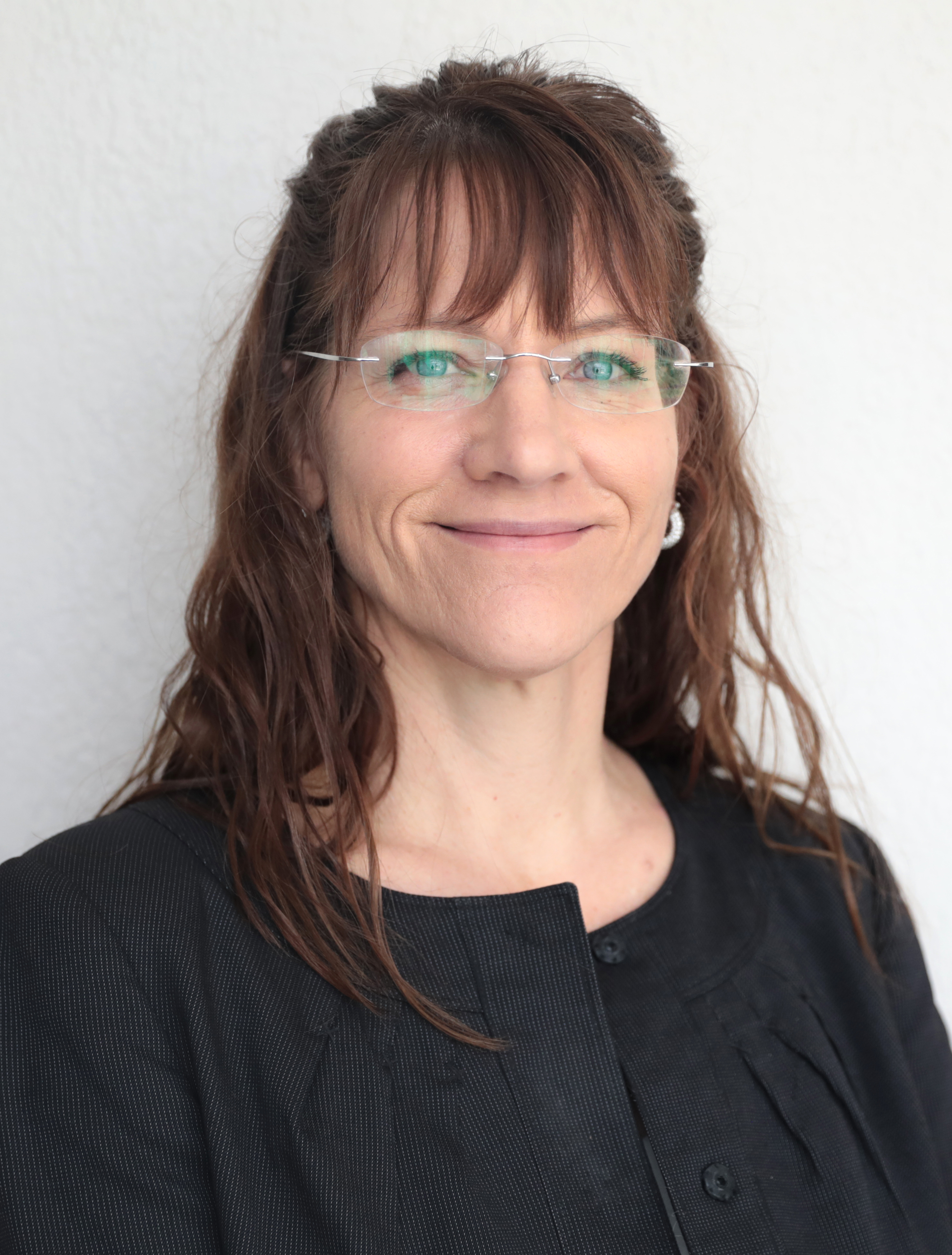

Member of the Maine House of Representatives from the 62nd district
- Incumbent
- Assumed office December 7, 2022
- Preceded by: Tim Theriault

Personal details
- Born: 1973 or 1974 (age 52–53) Rockland, Maine
- Party: Republican
- Spouse: Mike
- Children: 5
- Education: Bachelor of Arts
- Alma mater: Gordon College
- Profession: Real estate broker, Banker

Katrina Smith (born 1973 or 1974) is an American politician who has served as a member of the Maine House of Representatives since December 7, 2022. She represents Maine's 62nd House district. She lives in Palermo, Maine.

== Electoral history ==
Smith ran in the 2020 Maine House of Representatives election but lost to Democratic opponent Stanley Zeigler. She ran in the 2022 Maine House of Representatives election and won. After the 2024 election, Republicans innthe Maine House chose Smith as their assistant leader.

== Biography ==
Smith earned a Bachelor of Arts in sociology from Gordon College in 1995. She is a Christian.

Maine House of Representatives
Preceded by Gina Melaragno	Member of the Maine House of Representatives; 2022–present	Succeeded by incumbent
