= Rafael Macias =

American politician

Member of the Maine House of Representatives from the 51st district
- Incumbent
- Assumed office December 3, 2024
- Preceded by: Rebecca Jauch

Personal details
- Party: Democratic
- Education: University of Missouri
- Website: maciasforme.com www.rafaelmacias.com

Rafael Leo Macias is an American politician. He has served as a member of the Maine House of Representatives since December 2024. He represents the 51st district which contains the town of Topsham, Maine. He is a United States Navy veteran of the War in Afghanistan.
