= Kristen Cloutier =

American politician from Lewiston, Maine

Member of the Maine House of Representatives from the 94th district
- In office December 7, 2022 – October 31, 2025
- Preceded by: Victoria Doudera
- Succeeded by: Scott Harriman

Member of the Maine House of Representatives from the 60th district
- In office December 5, 2018 – December 7, 2022
- Preceded by: Jared Golden
- Succeeded by: William Bridgeo

Mayor of Lewiston
- In office March 8, 2019 – January 6, 2020
- Preceded by: Shane Bouchard
- Succeeded by: Mark Cayer

President of the Lewiston City Council
- In office January 2016 – March 8, 2019
- Preceded by: Mark Cayer
- Succeeded by: Mike Lajoie

Member of the Lewiston City Council
- In office January 2014 – March 8, 2019
- Preceded by: Craig Saddlemire
- Succeeded by: Luke Jensen

Personal details
- Born: Lewiston, Maine, U.S.
- Party: Democratic
- Spouse: Denny Bourgoin
- Children: 1
- Education: Northeastern University (BJ); University of Southern Maine (MSL)

Kristen Cloutier is an American politician from Lewiston, Maine. She served as a state representative from 2018 to 2025.

== Career ==
Cloutier was elected to the Lewiston City Council from Ward 5 in 2013. She became City Council President following the 2015 elections, making her first in line to succeed the incumbent mayor. After incumbent mayor Shane Bouchard resigned on March 8, 2019, following allegations of an extramarital affair, illegal conduct, and racism, Cloutier became mayor of Lewiston, serving until January 6, 2020, when Mark Cayer, the winner of the 2019 mayoral election, was sworn in.

On November 6, 2018, Cloutier was elected to the Maine House of Representatives representing part of Lewiston. She succeeded Jared Golden, who was elected to Congress. She is a member of the Democratic Party.

Cloutier resigned from the Maine House in October 2025 in order to take a position as chief of staff to Maine Senate President Mattie Daughtry. As chief of staff, Cloutier makes $142,001, a large increase from her previous legislative salary. She was succeeded by Scott Harriman, who was elected in the subsequent special election.
