= Sophia Warren =

American politician

Sophie Warren
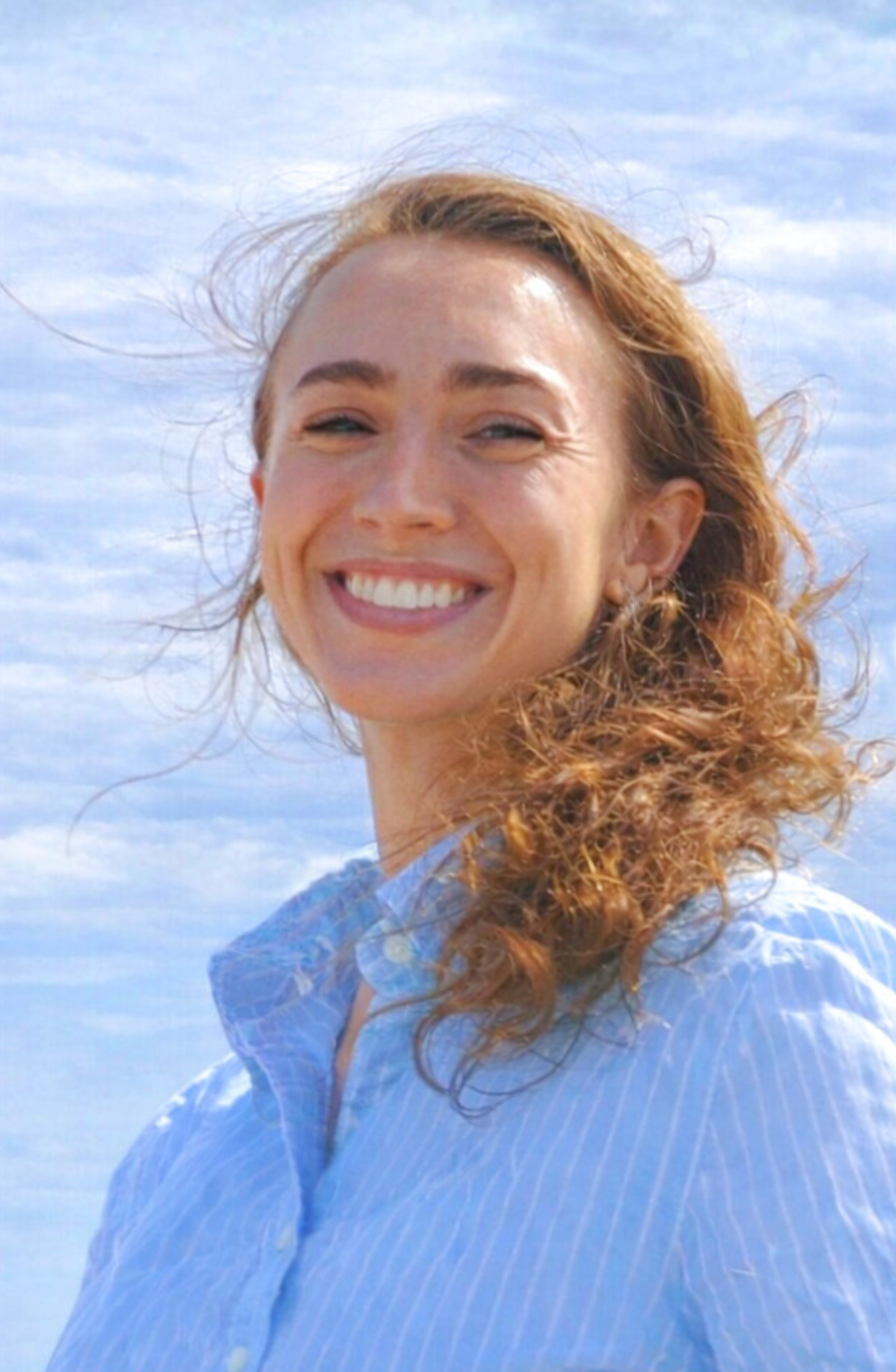

Member of the Maine House of Representatives
- Incumbent
- Assumed office December 7, 2022
- Preceded by: Joe Perry
- Constituency: 124th district
- In office December 2, 2020 – December 7, 2022
- Preceded by: Shawn Babine
- Succeeded by: Kathy Javner
- Constituency: 29th district

Personal details
- Born: Sophie Warren Portland, Maine, U.S.
- Party: Democratic
- Other political affiliations: Independent
- Education: Brandeis University (BA)

Sophia B. Warren is an American politician serving as a member of the Maine House of Representatives from the 29th district. She assumed office on December 2, 2020.

== Early life and education ==
Warren was born in Portland, Maine and raised in Scarborough. Warren attended Seeds of Peace International Camp as a teenager. She graduated from Catherine McAuley High School before earning a Bachelor of Arts degree in international and global studies from Brandeis University in 2019.

== Career ==
Warren served as a legislative intern in the office of Senator Angus King. She was also a deputy field organizer for the Bernie Sanders 2020 presidential campaign. She was elected to the Maine House of Representatives in November 2020 and assumed office the following month.
