= Chad R. Perkins =

American politician

The Honorable

Member of the U.S. House of Representatives from 's 31st district

Member of the Maine House of Representatives
- Incumbent
- Assumed office December 7, 2022
- Preceded by: Lois Galgay Reckitt

Member of the Maine House of Representatives from the 120th district
- In office December 2020 – December 7, 2022

Personal details
- Party: Republican
- Spouse: Dorothea
- Children: 10
- Profession

Chad R. Perkins is an American politician who has served as a member of the Maine House of Representatives since December 2020. Outside of politics, he works as a consultant and in law enforcement.

== Electoral history ==
He was first elected in the 2020 Maine House of Representatives election to the 120th district. He was redistricted to the 31st district in the 2022 Maine House of Representatives election.

== Biography ==
Perkins served in the United States Army for 11 years.
