= Kimberly Pomerleau =

American politician

The Honorable

Member of the Maine House of Representatives from the 85th district
- Incumbent
- Assumed office December 7, 2022
- Preceded by: Donna Doore

Personal details
- Party: Republican
- Spouse: Philip
- Children: 3
- Profession: Business owner

Kimberly Pomerleau is an American politician who has served as a member of the Maine House of Representatives since December 7, 2022. She represents Maine's 85th House district.

== Electoral history ==
Pomerleau was elected on November 8, 2022, in the 2022 Maine House of Representatives election against Democratic opponent Christopher Struebing. She assumed office on December 7, 2022.

Maine House of Representatives
Preceded by Donna Doore	Member of the Maine House of Representatives; 2022–present	Succeeded by incumbent
