= Lucien Daigle =

American politician

Member of the Maine House of Representatives from the 1st district
- Incumbent
- Assumed office December 3, 2024
- Preceded by: Austin Theriault

Personal details
- Born: Fort Kent, Maine
- Party: Republican
- Spouse: Cheryl
- Children: 1

Lucien J.B. Daigle is an American politician who has represented District 1 in the Maine House of Representatives since December 3, 2024.

== Biography ==
Daigle was born in Fort Kent, Maine. He holds a bachelor's degree from the University of Maine and an M.D. from Tufts University. He has previously worked as a dentist.

== Electoral record ==
2024 Maine House District 1 General Election
Party	Candidate	Votes	%
Republican	Lucien Daigle	3,170	65.1%
Democratic	John Martin	1,698	34.9%
Total votes		4,868	100.0%
