= Wayne Farrin =

American politician

Member of the Maine House of Representatives from the 47th district
- Incumbent
- Assumed office December 3, 2024
- Preceded by: Edward Polewarczyk

Personal details
- Party: Democratic
- Spouse: Lynn
- Children: 2
- Education: Southern Maine Community College
- Profession: Real estate

Wayne K. Farrin is an American politician who has represented District 47 in the Maine House of Representatives since December 3, 2024.

== Biography ==
Farrin attended Lincoln Academy and then Southern Maine Community College, then known as Southern Maine Vocational School, where he got his marine engineer's license. He worked in commercial shipping for 11 years, and later worked in real estate.

== Electoral record ==
2024 Maine House District 47 General Election
Party	Candidate	Votes	%
Democratic	Wayne Farrin	3,087	51.7%
Republican	Ed Polewarczyk	2,882	48.2%
Total votes		5,969	100.0%
