= David Rollins (politician) =

American politician

David (Dave) M. Rollins is an American politician from Maine. He is a Democrat and represented District 59 in the Maine House of Representatives. He was elected in 2024.

Rollins grew up in Augusta, Maine and graduated from Cony High School and graduated from Husson University in 1980.
