= Jennifer Poirier =

American politician

Member of the Maine House of Representatives from the 70th district
- Incumbent
- Assumed office December 7, 2020
- Preceded by: Betty Austin

Personal details
- Party: Republican

Jennifer Lynn Poirier is an American politician who has served as a member of the Maine House of Representatives since December 7, 2020. She represents Maine's 70th House district.
