= Amy Roeder =

American politician

Member of the Maine House of Representatives
- Incumbent
- Assumed office December 7, 2022
- Preceded by: Lester Ordway
- Constituency: 23rd district
- In office December 2, 2020 – December 7, 2022
- Preceded by: Victoria Kornfield
- Succeeded by: Kelly Noonan Murphy
- Constituency: 125th district

Personal details
- Born: Minneapolis, Minnesota, U.S.
- Party: Democratic
- Children: 2
- Education: University of Evansville (BFA); University of Georgia (MFA); University of Maine (MBA)

Amy J. Roeder is an American politician, actress, and academic serving as a member of the Maine House of Representatives from the 125th/23rd district. Elected in November 2020, she assumed office on December 2, 2020.

== Early life and education ==
Roeder was born in Minneapolis, Minnesota and raised in New London, Minnesota. She earned a Bachelor of Fine Arts degree in theatre from the University of Evansville and a Master of Fine Arts in theatre from the University of Georgia. She earned a Master of Business Administration from the University of Maine where she currently serves as an adjunct professor.

== Career ==
Roeder is a member of the Actors' Equity Association and SAG-AFTRA. From 1998 to 2002, she was an actor, writer, and instructor at Improv Asylum. In 2003 and 2004, she was a member of Gotham City Improv. In 2013 and 2014, she was an instructor at the Second City Training Center. From 2014 to 2018, was the director of education at the Penobscot Theatre Company. In 2018 and 2019, she was the executive director of the Criterion Theatre. Roeder was elected to the Maine House of Representatives in November 2020 and assumed office on December 2, 2020.

== Personal life ==
Roeder has two adopted sons and lives Bangor, Maine.

== Filmography ==
=== Film ===
Year	Title	Role	Notes
2007	Brothers Three: An American Gothic	Mourner	Uncredited
2021	Downeast	Darlene	

=== Television ===
Year	Title	Role	Notes
1996	Dying to be Perfect: The Ellen Hart Pena Story	Extra	Television film
2001	Home Movies	Episode: "Brendon's Choice"	
2003	Late Night with Conan O'Brien	Various	Episode: "DJ Qualls/Jesse James"
2003	Sketch Pad 2	Self	Television film
