= Holly Sargent =

American politician

Member of the Maine House of Representatives
- Incumbent
- Assumed office December 7, 2022
- Constituency: 147th district

Personal details
- Party: Democratic
- Education: Harvard College (BA)

Holly Sargent is an American politician from Maine. Sargent, a Democrat from Portland, Maine, has served in the Maine House of Representatives since December 2022.
