= Tiffany Roberts (politician) =

American politician

Member of the Maine House of Representatives
- Incumbent
- Assumed office December 4, 2018
- Preceded by: Jennifer Parker
- Constituency: 6th district (2018–2022); 149th district (2022–present)

Personal details
- Born: 1979 or 1980 (age 46–47)
- Party: Democratic
- Education: Salem State University; University of Phoenix (BA); University of Southern Maine (MPA)

Tiffany D. Roberts, (born 1979/1980) formerly Roberts-Lovell, is an American politician from Maine. Roberts, a Democrat from South Berwick, has served in the Maine House of Representatives since 2019.

== Biography ==
Roberts holds a bachelor's degree in business administration from the University of Phoenix. Roberts is a small business owner. She has three sons. One of her sons, Keagan, is openly gay and was elected to the South Berwick town council at age 19 in 2019.

== Political career ==
Roberts was first elected in the 2018 election, representing District 6. She was re-elected in 2020. She was redistricted to District 149 for the 2022 election. She won again, and was re-elected to District 149 in 2024. Her district contains parts of North Berwick and South Berwick. She served her first term on the Joint Standing Committee on Agriculture Conservation and Forestry, and her second and third terms as the House Chair of the Joint Standing Committee on Innovation Development Economic Advancement and Business. In 2024, she earned the award of Business Champion from the Maine State Chamber of Commerce for her work on the Dirigo Business Incentive Program.

On September 15, 2025, Roberts announced that she was forming an exploratory committee to prepare a primary challenge to Democratic Congresswoman Chellie Pingree of Maine's 1st congressional district in the 2026 election. She subsequently announced a campaign, but failed to qualify for the ballot.
