= Anne-Marie Mastraccio =

American politician

Member of the Maine House of Representatives
- Incumbent
- Assumed office December 7, 2022
- Succeeded by: Jeffrey Gifford
- Constituency: 142nd district
- In office December 3, 2014 – December 2, 2020
- Preceded by: redistricting
- Succeeded by: John Tuttle
- Constituency: 18th district
- In office December 5, 2012 – December 3, 2014
- Preceded by: John Tuttle
- Succeeded by: Stephen Stanley
- Constituency: 143rd district

Personal details
- Party: Democratic
- Profession: Dental hygienist

Anne-Marie Mastraccio is an American politician from Maine. Mastraccio, a Democrat from Sanford, Maine, has served in the Maine House of Representatives since December 2012.

== Positions ==
In 2017, Mastraccio co-sponsored a bill to reverse scheduled increases in the tipped minimum wage. The minimum wage increase was passed via a citizen's initiative in November 2016.
