= Maine House of Representatives =

Lower house of the Maine state legislature

- Maine State Legislature

Type
- Type: Lower house
- Term limits: 4 terms (8 years) consecutive

History
- New session started: December 4, 2024

Leadership
- Speaker: Ryan Fecteau (D) since December 4, 2024
- Majority Leader: Matt Moonen (D) since December 4, 2024
- Minority Leader: Billy Bob Faulkingham (R) since December 7, 2022

Structure
- Seats: 151 (and 3 non-voting)
- Political groups: Governing Minority: Democratic (75); Minority: Republican (73); Other: Independent (3); Nonpartisan (2 non-voting); Vacant: Vacant (1 non-voting (Note: The Penobscot Nation has withdrawn their non-voting representative to the Maine House of Representatives.))
- Length of term: 2 years
- Authority: Article IV, Part First, Maine Constitution
- Salary: Session 1: $13,526/year Session 2: $9,661/year + per diem

Elections
- Last election: November 5, 2024 (151 seats)
- Next election: November 3, 2026 (151 seats)
- Redistricting: Legislative Control

Meeting place
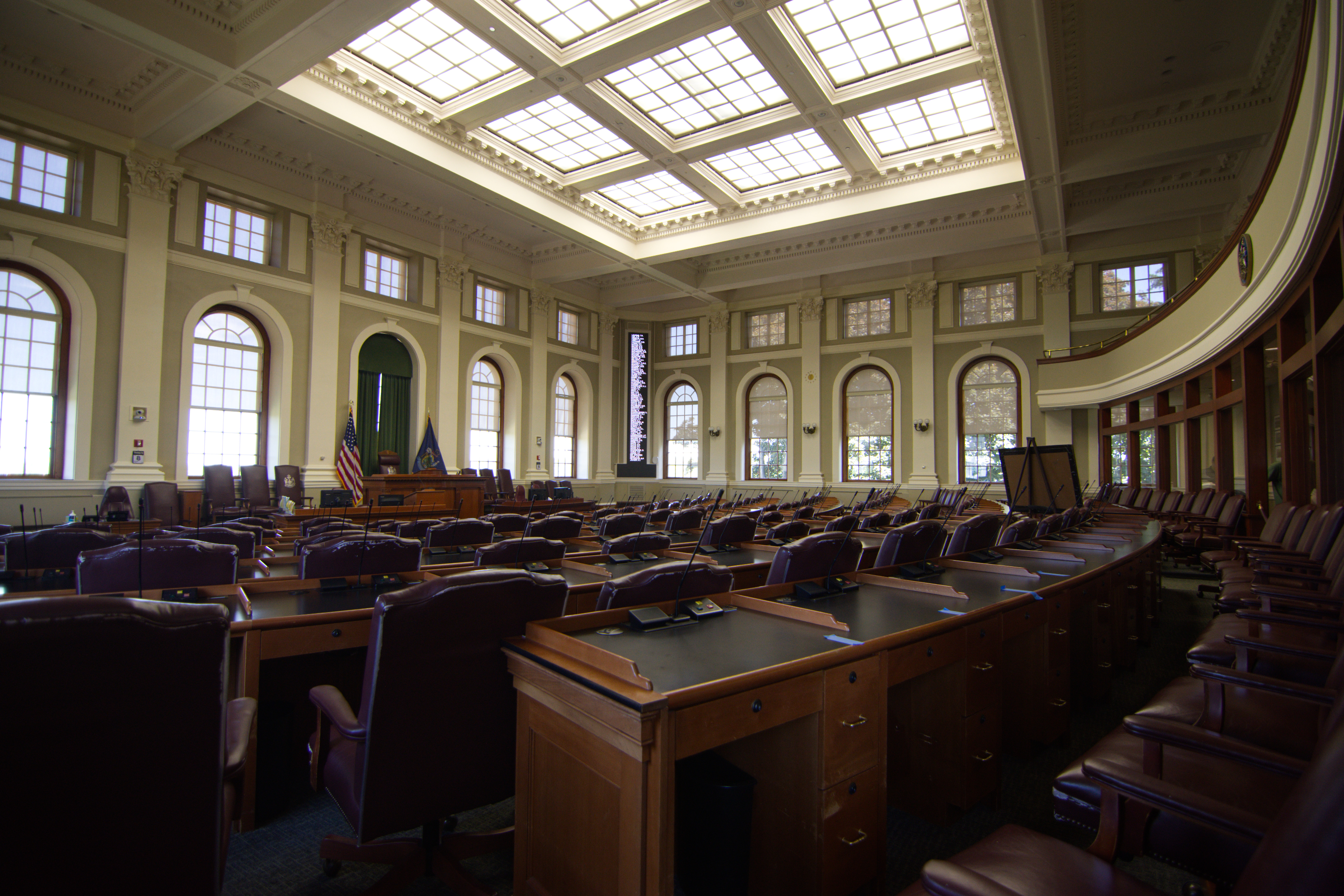
- House of Representatives Chamber; Maine State House; Augusta, Maine

Website
- Maine House of Representatives

The Maine House of Representatives is the lower house of the Maine Legislature. The House consists of 151 voting members and three nonvoting members. The voting members represent an equal number of districts across the state and are elected via plurality voting. The nonvoting members represent three of Maine's Native American tribes, though one tribe (the Penobscot Nation) has declined to send a representative. Each voting member of the House represents around 9,000 citizens of the state. Because it is a part-time position, members of the Maine House of Representatives usually have outside employment as well. Members are limited to four consecutive terms of two years each, but may run again after two years.

The House meets at the Maine State House in Augusta.

== Leadership of the House ==
The Speaker of the House presides over the House of Representatives. The Speaker is elected by the majority party caucus followed by confirmation of the full House through the passage of a House Resolution. In addition to presiding over the body, the Speaker is also the chief leadership position, and controls the flow of legislation and committee assignments. Other House leaders, such as the majority and minority leaders, are elected by their respective party caucuses relative to their party's strength in the chamber.

== Composition of the 132nd (2024–2026) Maine House of Representatives ==
Affiliation	Party (Shading indicates majority caucus)					Total	Vacant
Affiliation	Democratic	Republican	Independent	Green	Nonpart.	Total	Vacant
Begin 126th Legislature (Dec. 2012)	89	58	4	0		151	0
End 126th Legislature	89	57	4	0		150	1
Begin 127th Legislature (Dec. 2014)	79	68	4	0		151	0
End 127th Legislature	78	69	4	0		151	0
Begin 128th Legislature (Dec. 2016)	77	72	2	0		151	0
End 128th Legislature	73	70	6	1		150	1
Begin 129th Legislature (Dec. 2018) (Note: Includes a Rep.-elect who declined to take the oath of office.)	89	57	5	0		151	0
End 129th Legislature	87	56	6	0		149	2
Begin 130th Legislature (Dec. 2020)	80	67	4	0		151	0
End 130th Legislature	76	63	3	0		142	9
Begin 131st Legislature (Dec. 2022)	82	67	2	0		151	0
End 131st Legislature	79	67	2	0		148	3
Begin 132nd Legislature (Dec. 2024)	76	73	2	0		151	0
December 4, 2024 (Note: Rep.-elect Joe Perry (D-24) declined to take the oath of office after being nominated by Democrats in the Legislature to be Maine State Treasurer, to which post he was subsequently elected unanimously by joint ballot of the Legislature.)	75	73	2	0		150	1
February 25, 2025 (Note: Sean Faircloth (D) is elected to replace Joe Perry (D-24).)	76	73	2	0		151	0
September 17, 2025 (Note: W. Edward Crockett (D-112) leaves the Democratic Party to become an independent.)	75	73	3	0		151	0
October 31, 2025 (Note: Kristen Cloutier (D-94) resigned to become Chief of Staff to the President of the Maine Senate, Mattie Daughtry.)	74	73	3	0		150	1
January 10, 2026 (Note: Death of Kathy Irene Javner (R-29).)	74	72	3	0		149	2
February 24, 2026 (Note: Scott Harriman (D) is elected to replace Kristen Cloutier (D-94).)	75	72	3	0		150	1
June 9, 2026 (Note: Nancy Theriault (R) is elected to replace Kathy Irene Javner (R-29))	75	73	3	0		151	0
November 16, 2026 (Note: Lucas Lanigan (R–141) resigned.)	75	72	3	0		150	1
Latest voting share	50%	48%	2%				
Non-voting members					2	2	1

=== Nonvoting members of the House ===
The three nonvoting members within the House represent the Wabanaki or Dawnland nations of the Penobscot, the Passamaquoddy, and the Maliseet. The special Representatives can sponsor legislation relating specifically to the Tribes or in relation to Tribal – State land claims, as well as co-sponsor any other legislation brought before the House, but do not cast a legislative vote due to their unique tribal status representing their tribal members only. The Penobscot, Passamaquoddy and Maliseet tribal representatives are also entitled to sit as members of joint standing committees during hearings and deliberations, where they do cast votes, which can be very important with respect to specific legislative proposals.

Starting with the second session of the 125th Legislature, the Houlton Band of Maliseets was given a legislative seat in the House of Representatives. The first elected occupant of the seat was Henry John Bear. After being sworn in by Governor Paul LePage, Bear stated he would introduce legislation to give the Micmac people of Maine a nonvoting seat.

The Passamaquoddy and Penobscots announced at a State House rally on May 26, 2015, that they would withdraw their representatives from the Legislature, citing disputes over tribal fishing rights, jurisdictional issues, and a lack of respect for tribal sovereignty. They further cited an executive order by Governor Paul LePage that rescinded a prior order requiring consultation with the tribes on state issues that affected them as a reason for their decision. Subsequently, Matthew Dana II of the Passamaquoddy and Wayne Mitchell of the Penobscot left the legislature leaving Henry John Bear of the Maliseet the only non-voting tribal representative. In response, Speaker Eves said that the tribal representatives are always welcome in the House. Matthew Dana II returned to the House from the Passamaquoddy Tribe in the 2016 elections.

The Maliseets chose not to send a Representative to the 129th Legislature, elected in 2018. In 2025, the Maliseets chose Brian Reynolds to be their representative, filling the vacancy created in 2018.

As of February 2026, the Penobscots have not sent a Representative to the Legislature, leaving their seat vacant.

=== Independents and other parties ===
Due to the independent political tradition in the state, the Maine House of Representatives has been an entry ground for several of the state's prominent Independent politicians. From 2002 to 2006, Representative John Eder of Portland (District 118), belonging to the Maine Green Independent Party, served in the Legislature, the highest elected Green politician in U.S. politics at that time. Eder secured recognition as a one-member Green Party caucus in the House, receiving a dedicated staff person, which is unusual for individual legislators in the Maine House. In the 2006 elections, Eder lost his seat to a Democratic challenger. Having moved to Waterboro, Eder returned to the House in 2024 as a Republican.

On September 21, 2017, Ralph Chapman, previously registered as an independent, switched his registration to the Maine Green Independent Party, the first time in over a decade that the Maine Green Independent Party was represented at the state level. Chapman had been elected in 2016 as a Democrat.

There have been at least two independent members of the Maine House of Representatives continuously since the 126th legislature, elected in 2012. The current independent representatives are William Pluecker of Warren, Sharon Frost of Belgrade, and Ed Crockett of Portland. Crockett was elected as a Democrat, but became an independent in August 2025 ahead of a campaign for governor, while Pluecker and Frost were elected as independents.

=== Officers ===
Position	Representative	Party	Hometown
Speaker of the House	Ryan Fecteau	Democratic	Biddeford
Majority Leader	Matt Moonen	Democratic	Portland
Assistant Majority Leader/Whip	Lori Gramlich	Democratic	Old Orchard Beach
Minority Leader	Billy Bob Faulkingham	Republican	Winter Harbor
Assistant Minority Leader/Whip	Katrina Smith	Republican	Palermo

=== Members of the Maine House of Representatives ===
Districts are currently numbered starting with 1 from north to south. This is often reversed after each decennial redistricting, and it was reversed in the redistricting which occurred in 2021 and which went into effect beginning with the 2022 primary and general elections. The previous district lines, which were drawn in 2013 and were first used in the 2014 primary and general elections, were only in effect for 8 years rather than the usual 10 as Maine adjusted its legislative redistricting cycle to conform with most other states.

↑ denotes that the Representative first won in a special election

District	Representative	Party	Residence	First elected	Term-limited
1	Lucien J.B. Daigle	Rep	Fort Kent	2024	2032
2	Roger Albert	Rep	Madawaska	2022	2030
3	Mark Babin	Rep	Fort Fairfield	2022	2030
4	Timothy Guerrette	Rep	Caribou	2022	2030
5	Joseph F. Underwood	Rep	Presque Isle	2020	2028
6	Donald Ardell	Rep	Monticello	2022	2030
7	Gregory Swallow	Rep	Houlton	2022 (2018–2020)	2030
8	Tracy Quint	Rep	Hodgdon	2020	2028
9	Arthur Kevin Mingo	Rep	Calais	2024	2032
10	William R. Tuell	Rep	East Machias	2024 (2014–2022)	2032
11	Tiffany Strout	Rep	Harrington	2022	2030
12	Billy Bob Faulkingham	Rep	Winter Harbor	2018	2026
13	Russell P. White	Rep	Ellsworth	2024	2032
14	Gary Friedmann	Dem	Bar Harbor	2024	2032
15	Holly Eaton	Dem	Deer Isle	2022	2030
16	Nina Milliken	Dem	Blue Hill	2022	2030
17	Steven M. Bishop	Rep	Bucksport	2024	2032
18	Mathew David McIntyre	Rep	Lowell	2024	2032
19	Richard H. Campbell	Rep	Orrington	2022 (1992–2000; 2012–2020)	2030
20	Dani L. O'Halloran	Dem	Brewer	2024	2032
21	Ambureen Rana	Dem	Bangor	2022	2030
22	Laura Supica	Dem	Bangor	2020	2028
23	Amy Roeder	Dem	Bangor	2020	2028
24	Sean Faircloth	Dem	Bangor	2025↑ (1992–1994; 2002–2008)	2032
25	Laurie Osher	Dem	Orono	2020	2028
26	Jim Dill	Dem	Old Town	2022 (2010–2014)	2030
27	Gary Drinkwater	Rep	Milford	2018	2026
28	Irene Gifford	Rep	Lincoln	2022	2030
29	Nancy Theriault	Rep	Millinocket	2026↑	2034
30	James Lee White	Rep	Guilford	2022	2030
31	Chad R. Perkins	Rep	Dover-Foxcroft	2022	2030
32	Steven D. Foster	Rep	Dexter	2018	2026
33	Kenneth Fredette	Rep	Newport	2024 (2010–2018)	2032
34	Abigail Griffin	Rep	Levant	2018	2026
35	James E. Thorne	Rep	Carmel	2020	2028
36	Kimberly M. Haggan	Rep	Hampden	2024	2032
37	Reagan Paul	Rep	Winterport	2022	2030
38	Benjamin C. Hymes	Rep	Waldo	2022	2030
39	Janice Dodge	Dem	Belfast	2018	2026
40	D. Michael Ray	Dem	Lincolnville	2024	2032
41	Victoria Doudera	Dem	Camden	2018	2026
42	Valli Geiger	Dem	Rockland	2020	2028
43	Ann Matlack	Dem	St. George	2018	2026
44	William Pluecker	Ind	Warren	2018	2026
45	Abden Simmons	Rep	Waldoboro	2023↑ (2016–2018)	2030
46	Lydia Crafts	Dem	Newcastle	2020	2028
47	Wayne K. Farrin	Dem	Jefferson	2024	2032
48	Holly Stover	Dem	Boothbay	2018	2026
49	Allison Hepler	Dem	Woolwich	2018	2026
50	David Sinclair	Dem	Bath	2023↑	2032
51	Rafael Leo Macias	Dem	Topsham	2024	2032
52	Sally Cluchey	Dem	Bowdoinham	2022	2030
53	Michael Lemelin	Rep	Chelsea	2020	2028
54	Karen Montell	Dem	Gardiner	2022	2030
55	Daniel Shagoury	Dem	Hallowell	2022	2030
56	Randall Greenwood	Rep	Wales	2020 (2014–2016)	2028
57	Tavis Hasenfus	Dem	Readfield	2020	2028
58	Sharon C. Frost	Ind	Belgrade	2024	2032
59	David Rollins	Dem	Augusta	2024	2032
60	William Bridgeo	Dem	Augusta	2022	2030
61	Alicia Carol Collins	Rep	Sidney	2024	2032
62	Katrina Smith	Rep	Palermo	2022	2030
63	Paul R. Flynn	Rep	Albion	2024	2032
64	Flavia M. DeBrito	Dem	Waterville	2024	2032
65	Cassie Lynn Julia	Dem	Waterville	2024	2032
66	Robert Nutting	Rep	Oakland	2022 (1998–2006; 2008–2016)	2030
67	Shelley Rudnicki	Rep	Fairfield	2018	2026
68	Amanda Collamore	Rep	Pittsfield	2020	2028
69	Dean Cray	Rep	Palmyra	2022 (2006–2014)	2030
70	Jennifer Poirier	Rep	Skowhegan	2020	2028
71	John Ducharme	Rep	Madison	2020	2028
72	Elizabeth M. Caruso	Rep	Caratunk	2024	2032
73	Michael Soboleski	Rep	Phillips	2022	2030
74	Randall Hall	Rep	Wilton	2018	2026
75	Stephan M. Bunker	Dem	Farmington	2024	2032
76	Sheila Lyman	Rep	Livermore Falls	2020	2028
77	Tammy Schmersal-Burgess	Rep	Mexico	2022	2030
78	Rachel A. Henderson	Rep	Rumford	2022	2030
79	Michael J. Lance	Rep	Paris	2024	2032
80	Caldwell Jackson	Rep	Oxford	2022	2030
81	Peter Conley Wood	Rep	Norway	2024	2032
82	Nathan Wadsworth	Rep	Hiram	2024 (2014–2022)	2032
83	Marygrace Caroline Cimino	Rep	Bridgton	2024	2032
84	Mark Walker	Rep	Naples	2022	2030
85	Kimberly Pomerleau	Rep	Standish	2022	2030
86	Rolf A. Olsen	Rep	Raymond	2024	2032
87	David Boyer	Rep	Poland	2022	2030
88	Quentin J. Chapman	Rep	Auburn	2024	2032
89	Adam R. Lee	Dem	Auburn	2022	2030
90	Laurel Libby	Rep	Auburn	2020	2028
91	Joshua Morris	Rep	Turner	2018	2026
92	Stephen J. Wood	Rep	Greene	2022 (2010–2018)	2030
93	Julia A.G. McCabe	Dem	Lewiston	2024	2032
94	Scott Harriman	Dem	Lewiston	2026↑	2034
95	Mana Abdi	Dem	Lewiston	2022	2030
96	Michel Lajoie	Dem	Lewiston	2022 (2008–2016)	2030
97	Richard G. Mason	Rep	Lisbon	2017↑	2026
98	Kilton M. Webb	Dem	Durham	2024	2032
99	Cheryl Golek	Dem	Harpswell	2022	2030
100	Daniel Ankeles	Dem	Brunswick	2022	2030
101	Poppy Arford	Dem	Brunswick	2020	2028
102	Melanie Sachs	Dem	Freeport	2020	2028
103	Arthur L. Bell	Dem	Yarmouth	2020	2028
104	Amy Arata	Rep	New Gloucester	2018	2026
105	Anne P. Graham	Dem	North Yarmouth	2022 (2010–2014)	2030
106	Barbara Bagshaw	Rep	Windham	2022	2030
107	Mark C. Cooper	Rep	Windham	2024	2032
108	Parnell William Terry	Dem	Gorham	2024	2032
109	Eleanor Y. Sato	Dem	Gorham	2024	2032
110	Christina R.C. Mitchell	Dem	Cumberland	2024	2032
111	Amy Kuhn	Dem	Falmouth	2022	2030
112	W. Edward Crockett	Ind	Portland	2018	2026
113	Grayson Lookner	Dem	Portland	2020	2028
114	Dylan R. Pugh	Dem	Portland	2024	2032
115	Michael F. Brennan	Dem	Portland	2018 (1992–2000)	2026
116	Samuel Zager	Dem	Portland	2020	2028
117	Matt Moonen	Dem	Portland	2022 (2012–2020)	2030
118	Yusuf M. Yusuf	Dem	Portland	2024	2032
119	Charles Skold	Dem	Portland	2022	2030
120	Deqa Dhalac	Dem	South Portland	2022	2030
121	Christopher Kessler	Dem	South Portland	2018	2026
122	Matthew D. Beck	Dem	South Portland	2024↑	2032
123	Michelle Nicole Boyer	Dem	Cape Elizabeth	2024	2032
124	Sophia Warren	Dem	Scarborough	2020	2028
125	Kelly Noonan Murphy	Dem	Scarborough	2022	2030
126	Drew Gattine	Dem	Westbrook	2022 (2012–2020)	2030
127	Morgan Rielly	Dem	Westbrook	2020	2028
128	Suzanne Salisbury	Dem	Westbrook	2020	2028
129	Marshall F. Archer	Dem	Saco	2024	2032
130	Lynn Copeland	Dem	Saco	2020	2028
131	Lori Gramlich	Dem	Old Orchard Beach	2018	2026
132	Ryan Fecteau	Dem	Biddeford	2024 (2014–2022)	2032
133	Marc Malon	Dem	Biddeford	2022	2030
134	Traci Gere	Dem	Kennebunkport	2020	2028
135	Daniel Sayre	Dem	Kennebunk	2022	2030
136	John Eder	Rep	Waterboro	2024 (2002–2006)	2032
137	Nathan Carlow	Rep	Buxton	2020	2028
138	Mark Blier	Rep	Buxton	2018	2026
139	David Woodsome	Rep	Waterboro	2022	2030
140	Wayne Parry	Rep	Arundel	2020 (2010–2018)	2028
141	Vacant				
142	Anne-Marie Mastraccio	Dem	Sanford	2022 (2012–2020)	2030
143	Ann Fredericks	Rep	Sanford	2022	2030
144	Jeffrey S. Adams	Rep	Lebanon	2022	2030
145	Robert Foley	Rep	Wells	2024 (2014–2018)	2032
146	Walter Runte	Dem	York	2022	2030
147	Holly Sargent	Dem	York	2022	2030
148	Thomas Lavigne	Rep	Berwick	2022	2030
149	Tiffany Roberts	Dem	South Berwick	2018	2026
150	Michele Meyer	Dem	Eliot	2018	2026
151	Kristi Mathieson	Dem	Kittery	2020	2028

=== Tribal Representatives (non-voting) ===
Tribe	Name	Party	Residence	Start	Term Limited
Houlton Band of Maliseet Indians	Brian Reynolds	Nptsn	Augusta	2025	2034
Passamaquoddy Tribe	Aaron M. Dana	Nptsn	Princeton	2022	2030
Penobscot Nation	Vacant				

↑ Member was first elected in a special election

== Notable former members ==
- Augusta Kalloch Christie, first woman to serve in both houses of the Maine legislature, 1953–1961
- Hannibal Hamlin, Vice President of the United States during the United States Civil War.

== See also ==
- Category:Members of the Maine House of Representatives
- Maine State House
- Maine Legislature
- Maine Senate
- Wabanaki Confederacy
