= 2022 Maine House of Representatives election =

- November 8, 2022

All 151 seats in the Maine House of Representatives 76 seats needed for a majority
- Registered: 1,145,052(▲0.55 pp)
- Turnout: 59.47%(▼13.27 pp)
	Majority party	Minority party	Third party
Leader	Ryan Fecteau (term-limited)	Billy Bob Faulkingham	None
Party	Democratic	Republican	Independents
Leader's seat	133rd	12th	N/A
Last election	80	67	4
Seats after	82	67	2
Seat change	▲2	Steady	▼2
Popular vote	323,064	295,258	24,798
Percentage	50.19%	45.87%	3.85%
Swing	▼1.35 (pp)	▲1.36 (pp)	▲0.49 (pp)
- Democratic gain Republican gain Democratic hold Republican hold Independent hold Democratic: 50–60% 60–70% 70–80% 80–90% >90% Republican: 40–50% 50–60% 60–70% 70–80% >90% Independent: 50–60%
Speaker before election
Ryan Fecteau
Democratic
Elected Speaker
Rachel Talbot Ross
Democratic

The 2022 Maine House of Representatives elections took place on November 8, 2022, alongside the biennial United States elections. Maine voters elected members of the Maine House of Representatives via instant-runoff voting in all 151 of the state house's districts, as well as a non-voting member from the Passamaquoddy Tribe. These were the first elections in Maine following the 2020 United States redistricting cycle, which resulted in nearly all members being assigned to new districts.

The election was also held alongside elections for the Maine Senate. State representatives serve two-year terms in the Maine State House. Democrats gained five seats and Republicans gained four seats, many of them previously vacant.

== Predictions ==
Source	Ranking	As of
Sabato's Crystal Ball	Tossup	October 28, 2022

== Overview ==
=== Election ===
2022 Maine House of Representatives election General election — November 8, 2022
Maine House voting December 7, 2022
Party	Votes	Percentage	Seats	+/–
Democratic	323,064	50.19	82	▲2
Republican	295,258	45.87	67	Steady
Independents (Note: Independents are sometimes called "Unenrolled" or other names in source)	24,798	3.85	2	▼2
Green	586	0.09	0	Steady
Valid votes	643,706	94.55	—	—
Blank votes	37,133	5.45	—	—
**Totals**	**680,839**	**100**	**151**	—
Registered voter/turnout	1,145,052	59.57		

=== Summary of results by House district ===
Italics denote an open seat held by the incumbent party; bold text denotes a gain for a party.

State House District	Redistricted from	Incumbent	Party	Elected Representative	Party
1st	151st	John L. Martin	Dem	**Austin Theriault**	**Rep**
2nd	150th	Danny Martin	Dem	**Roger Albert**	**Rep**
3rd	148th	David McCrea	Dem	**Mark Babin**	**Rep**
4th	149th	Susan Bernard	Rep	Timothy Guerrette	Rep
4th	146th	Dustin White	Rep	Timothy Guerrette	Rep
5th	147th	Joseph F. Underwood	Rep	Joseph F. Underwood	Rep
6th	143rd	Peggy Jo Stanley	Rep	Donald Ardell	Rep
7th	Vacant			**Gregory Swallow**	**Rep**
8th	144th	Tracy Quint	Rep	Tracy Quint	Rep
9th	140th	Anne C. Perry	Dem	Anne C. Perry	Dem
10th	138th	Robert Alley	Dem	**Kenneth Ralph Davis Jr.**	**Rep**
11th	139th	William Tuell	Rep	Tiffany Strout	Rep
12th	136th	Billy Bob Faulkingham	Rep	Billy Bob Faulkingham	Rep
13th	Vacant			**J. Mark Worth**	**Dem**
14th	135th	Lynne Williams	Dem	Lynne Williams	Dem
15th	Vacant			**Holly Eaton**	**Dem**
16th	133rd	Sarah Pebworth	Dem	Nina Milliken	Dem
17th	131st	Sherman Hutchins	Rep	**Ronald B. Russell**	**Dem**
18th	137th	Meldon Carmichael	Rep	Meldon Carmichael	Rep
19th	130th	Kathy Downes	Rep	Richard H. Campbell	Rep
19th	129th	Peter Lyford	Rep	Richard H. Campbell	Rep
20th	128th	Kevin O'Connell	Dem	Kevin O'Connell	Dem
21st	Vacant			**Ambureen Rana**	**Dem**
22nd	126th	Laura Supica	Dem	Laura Supica	Dem
23rd	125th	Amy Roeder	Dem	Amy Roeder	Dem
24th	124th	Joe Perry	Dem	Joe Perry	Dem
25th	123rd	Laurie Osher	Dem	Laurie Osher	Dem
26th	122nd	Michelle Dunphy	Dem	James Dill	Dem
27th	121st	Gary Drinkwater	Rep	Gary Drinkwater	Rep
28th	Vacant			**Irene Gifford**	**Rep**
29th	141st	Kathy Javner	Rep	Kathy Javner	Rep
30th	119th	Paul Stearns	Rep	James Lee White	Rep
31st	120th	Richard Evans	Dem	**Chad R. Perkins**	**Rep**
32nd	104th	Steven D. Foster	Rep	Steven D. Foster	Rep
33rd	100th	Danny Costain	Rep	Danny Costain	Rep
34th	102nd	Abigail W. Griffin	Rep	Abigail W. Griffin	Rep
35th	103rd	James E. Thorne	Rep	James E. Thorne	Rep
36th	101st	David Haggan	Rep	David Haggan	Rep
37th	98th	Scott Cuddy	Dem	**Reagan Paul**	**Rep**
38th	99th	MaryAnne Kinney	Rep	Benjamin C. Hymes	Rep
39th	97th	Janice Dodge	Dem	Janice Dodge	Dem
40th	96th	Stanley Zeigler	Dem	Stanley Zeigler	Dem
41st	94th	Victoria Doudera	Dem	Victoria Doudera	Dem
42nd	93rd	Valli Geiger	Dem	Valli Geiger	Dem
43rd	92nd	Ann Matlack	Dem	Ann Matlack	Dem
44th	95th	William Pluecker	Ind	William Pluecker	Ind
45th	91st	Jeffrey Evangelos	Ind	**Clinton Collamore**	**Dem**
46th	90th	Lydia Crafts	Dem	Lydia Crafts	Dem
47th	87th	Jeffery Hanley	Rep	Edward Polewarczyk	Rep
48th	89th	Holly Stover	Dem	Holly Stover	Dem
49th	53rd	Allison Hepler	Dem	Allison Hepler	Dem
50th	52nd	Sean Paulhus	Dem	Sean Paulhus	Dem
51st	54th	Denise Tepler	Dem	Rebecca Jauch	Dem
52nd	Vacant			**Sally Jeane Cluchey**	**Dem**
53rd	88th	Michael Lemelin	Rep	Michael Lemelin	Rep
54th	83rd	Thom Harnett	Dem	Karen Montell	Dem
55th	84th	Charlotte Warren	Dem	Daniel Shagoury	Dem
56th	82nd	Randall Greenwood	Rep	Randall Greenwood	Rep
57th	81st	Tavis Hasenfus	Dem	Tavis Hasenfus	Dem
58th	76th	Daniel J. Newman	Rep	Daniel J. Newman	Rep
59th	86th	Raegan LaRochelle	Dem	Raegan LaRochelle	Dem
60th	Vacant			**William Bridgeo**	**Dem**
61st	80th	Richard Bradstreet	Rep	Richard Bradstreet	Rep
62nd	79th	Timothy Theriault	Rep	Katrina Smith	Rep
63rd	78th	Cathy Nadeau	Rep	Scott Cyrway	Rep
64th	110th	Colleen Madigan	Dem	Colleen Madigan	Dem
65th	109th	Bruce A. White	Dem	Bruce A. White	Dem
66th	77th	Michael Perkins	Rep	Robert Nutting	Rep
67th	108th	Shelley Rudnicki	Rep	Shelley Rudnicki	Rep
68th	106th	Amanda Collamore	Rep	Amanda Collamore	Rep
69th	105th	Joel Stetkis	Rep	Dean Cray	Rep
70th	107th	Jennifer Poirier	Rep	Jennifer Poirier	Rep
71st	111th	John E. Ducharme III	Rep	John E. Ducharme III	Rep
72nd	112th	Thomas Skolfield	Rep	Larry Dunphy	Rep
73rd	118th	Chad Wayne Grignon	Rep	Michael Soboleski	Rep
74th	114th	Randall C. Hall	Rep	Randall C. Hall	Rep
75th	113th	H. Scott Landry	Dem	H. Scott Landry	Dem
76th	74th	Sheila Lyman	Rep	Sheila Lyman	Rep
77th	116th	Richard Pickett	Rep	Tammy Schmersal-Burgess	Rep
78th	115th	Josanne C. Dolloff	Rep	Rachel Ann Henderson	Rep
78th	117th	Frances Head	Rep	Rachel Ann Henderson	Rep
79th	73rd	John Andrews	Rep	John Andrews	Rep
80th	72nd	Kathleen Dillingham	Rep	Caldwell Jackson	Rep
81st	71st	Sawin Millett	Rep	Sawin Millett	Rep
82nd	70th	Nathan Wadsworth	Rep	Caleb Joshua Ness	Rep
83rd	69th	Walter N. Riseman	Ind	Walter N. Riseman	Ind
84th	68th	Richard Cebra	Rep	Mark Walker	Rep
85th	23rd	Lester Ordway	Rep	Kimberly Pomerleau	Rep
86th	66th	Jessica Fay	Dem	Jessica Fay	Dem
87th	Vacant			**David Boyer**	**Rep**
88th	63rd	Bruce Bickford	Rep	**Kathleen A. "Kathy" Shaw**	**Dem**
89th	62nd	Gina Melaragno	Dem	Adam R. Lee	Dem
90th	64th	Laurel Libby	Rep	Laurel Libby	Rep
91st	75th	Joshua Morris	Rep	Joshua Morris	Rep
92nd	57th	Thomas Martin	Rep	Stephen J. Wood	Rep
93rd	59th	Margaret Craven	Dem	Margaret Craven	Dem
94th	60th	Kristen Cloutier	Dem	Kristen Cloutier	Dem
95th	61st	Heidi Brooks	Dem	Mana Abdi	Dem
96th	58th	Jonathan Connor	Rep	**Michel Lajoie**	**Dem**
97th	56th	Richard G. "Rick" Mason	Rep	Richard G. "Rick" Mason	Rep
98th	46th	Braden Sharpe	Dem	**Joseph C. Galletta**	**Rep**
99th	51st	Joyce McCreight	Dem	Cheryl Golek	Dem
100th	50th	Ralph Tucker	Dem	Daniel Ankeles	Dem
101st	49th	Poppy Arford	Dem	Poppy Arford	Dem
102nd	48th	Melanie Sachs	Dem	Melanie Sachs	Dem
103rd	47th	Arthur L. Bell	Dem	Arthur L. Bell	Dem
104th	65th	Amy Arata	Rep	Amy Arata	Rep
105th	67tth	Susan Austin	Rep	**Anne P. Graham**	**Dem**
106th	24th	Mark Bryant	Dem	**Barbara Bagshaw**	**Rep**
107th	25th	Patrick Corey	Rep	**Jane Pringle**	**Dem**
108th	108th	Maureen Terry	Dem	Maureen Terry	Dem
109th	27th	James Boyle	Dem	James Boyle	Dem
110th	45th	Stephen Moriarty	Dem	Stephen Moriarty	Dem
111th	44th	Teresa Pierce	Dem	Amy Kuhn	Dem
112th	43rd	W. Edward Crockett	Dem	W. Edward Crockett	Dem
113th	37th	Grayson Lookner	Dem	Grayson Lookner	Dem
114th	42nd	Benjamin Collings	Dem	Benjamin Collings	Dem
115th	36th	Michael F. Brennan	Dem	Michael F. Brennan	Dem
116th	41st	Samuel Zager	Dem	Samuel Zager	Dem
117th	38th	Barbara Wood	Dem	Matthew Moonen	Dem
118th	40th	Rachel Talbot Ross	Dem	Rachel Talbot Ross	Dem
119th	39th	Michael Sylvester	Dem	Charles Skold	Dem
120th	33rd	Victoria Morales	Dem	Deqa Dhalac	Dem
121st	32nd	Christopher Kessler	Dem	Christopher Kessler	Dem
122nd	31st	Lois Reckitt	Dem	Lois Reckitt	Dem
123rd	30th	Rebecca Millett	Dem	Rebecca Millett	Dem
124th	29th	Sophia Warren	Dem	Sophia Warren	Dem
125th	28th	Chris Caiazzo	Dem	Kelly Noonan Murphy	Dem
126th	Vacant			**Andrew Gattine**	**Dem**
127th	34th	Morgan Rielly	Dem	Morgan Rielly	Dem
128th	35th	Suzanne Salisbury	Dem	Suzanne Salisbury	Dem
129th	15th	Margaret O'Neil	Dem	Margaret O'Neil	Dem
130th	14th	Lynn Copeland	Dem	Lynn Copeland	Dem
131st	13th	Lori Gramlich	Dem	Lori Gramlich	Dem
132nd	12th	Erin Sheehan	Dem	Erin Sheehan	Dem
133rd	11th	Ryan Fecteau	Dem	Marc Malon	Dem
134th	9th	Traci Gere	Dem	Traci Gere	Dem
135th	8th	Christopher Babbidge	Dem	Daniel Sayre	Dem
136th	21st	Heidi Sampson	Rep	Heidi Sampson	Rep
137th	16th	Nathan Carlow	Rep	Nathan Carlow	Rep
138th	22nd	Mark Blier	Rep	Mark Blier	Rep
139th	17th	Dwayne Prescott	Rep	David Woodsome	Rep
140th	10th	Wayne Parry	Rep	Wayne Parry	Rep
141st	19th	Matthew Harrington	Rep	Lucas Lanigan	Rep
142nd	Vacant			**Anne-Marie Mastraccio**	**Dem**
143rd	7th	Lydia Blume	Dem	**Ann Marie Fredericks**	**Rep**
144th	Vacant			**Jeffrey Sean Adams**	**Rep**
145th	3rd	Timothy Roche	Rep	**Daniel Hobbs**	**Dem**
146th	Vacant			**Walter Runte**	**Dem**
147th	4th	Patricia Hymanson	Dem	Holly Sargent	Dem
148th	5th	Beth O'Connor	Rep	Thomas Lavigne	Rep
149th	6th	Tiffany Danielle Roberts	Dem	Tiffany Danielle Roberts	Dem
150th	2nd	Michele Meyer	Dem	Michele Meyer	Dem
151st	1st	Kristi Mathieson	Dem	Kristi Mathieson	Dem
**Non-Voting Members**
Passamaquoddy		Aaron Dana	NVT (Note: Non-voting tribal member)	Aaron Dana	NVT
Maliseet		Zeke Crofton-Macdonald	NVT	Zeke Crofton-Macdonald	NVT

== Detailed results ==
Sources for election results:

=== District 1 ===
Primary Election Results
Party	Candidate	Votes	%
Democratic Party Primary Results
Democratic	Toby D. Jandreau (Note: After winning the primary election, Jandreau voluntarily withdrew. He was replaced on the general election ballot by Democrat Dana Marie Appleby.)	303	100.00%
Total votes		303	100.00%
Republican Party Primary Results
Republican	Austin L. Theriault	348	100.00%
Total votes		348	100.00%

General Election Results
Party	Candidate	Votes	%
Republican	Austin L. Theriault	2,809	69.15%
Democratic	Dana Marie Appleby	1,253	30.85%
Total votes		4,062	100.00%
Republican gain from Democratic			

=== District 2 ===
Primary Election Results
Party	Candidate	Votes	%
Democratic Party Primary Results
Democratic	Bernard Paradis	385	100.00%
Total votes		385	100.00%
Republican Party Primary Results
Republican	Roger Clarence Albert	297	100.00%
Total votes		297	100.00%

General Election Results
Party	Candidate	Votes	%
Republican	Roger Clarence Albert	2,403	58.91%
Democratic	Bernard Paradis	1,676	41.09%
Total votes		4,079	100.00%
Republican gain from Democratic			

=== District 3 ===
Primary Election Results
Party	Candidate	Votes	%
Democratic Party Primary Results
Democratic	David H. McCrea (incumbent)	209	100.00%
Total votes		209	100.00%
Republican Party Primary Results
Republican	Mark Michael Babin	416	100.00%
Total votes		416	100.00%

General Election Results
Party	Candidate	Votes	%
Republican	Mark Michael Babin	2,065	51.75%
Democratic	David H. McCrea (incumbent)	1,925	48.25%
Total votes		3,990	100.00%
Republican gain from Democratic			

=== District 4 ===
Primary Election Results
Party	Candidate	Votes	%
Democratic Party Primary Results
Democratic	Jordyn Victoria Rossignol	261	100.00%
Total votes		261	100.00%
Republican Party Primary Results
Republican	Timothy C. Guerrette	546	100.00%
Total votes		546	100.00%

General Election Results
Party	Candidate	Votes	%
Republican	Timothy C. Guerrette	2,387	63.76%
Democratic	Jordyn Victoria Rossignol	1,357	36.24%
Total votes		3,744	100.00%
Republican hold			

=== District 5 ===
Primary Election Results
Party	Candidate	Votes	%
Democratic Party Primary Results
Democratic	Kevin Gregory Freeman	148	100.00%
Total votes		148	100.00%
Republican Party Primary Results
Republican	Joseph F. Underwood (incumbent)	263	100.00%
Total votes		263	100.00%

General Election Results
Party	Candidate	Votes	%
Republican	Joseph F. Underwood (incumbent)	1,857	57.05%
Democratic	Kevin Gregory Freeman	1,398	42.95%
Total votes		3,255	100.00%
Republican hold			

=== District 6 ===
Primary Election Results
Party	Candidate	Votes	%
Republican Party Primary Results
Republican	Donald J. Ardell	451	100.00%
Total votes		451	100.00%

General Election Results
Party	Candidate	Votes	%
Republican	Donald J. Ardell	3,294	100.00%
Total votes		3,294	100.00%
Republican hold			

=== District 7 ===
Primary Election Results
Party	Candidate	Votes	%
Democratic Party Primary Results
Democratic	Michael E. Carpenter (Note: Despite winning the Democratic primary election, Carpenter did not advance to the general election ballot.)	91	100.00%
Total votes		91	100.00%
Republican Party Primary Results
Republican	Gregory L. Swallow	323	100.00%
Total votes		323	100.00%

General Election Results
Party	Candidate	Votes	%
Republican	Gregory L. Swallow	2,752	100.00%
Total votes		2,752	100.00%
Republican win (new seat)			

=== District 8 ===
Primary Election Results
Party	Candidate	Votes	%
Democratic Party Primary Results
Democratic	Kevin B. Ritchie	159	100.00%
Total votes		159	100.00%
Republican Party Primary Results
Republican	Tracy Lynn Quint (incumbent)	542	100.00%
Total votes		542	100.00%

General Election Results
Party	Candidate	Votes	%
Republican	Tracy Lynn Quint (incumbent)	2,966	72.82%
Democratic	Kevin B. Ritchie	1,107	27.18%
Total votes		4,073	100.00%
Republican hold			

=== District 9 ===
Primary Election Results
Party	Candidate	Votes	%
Democratic Party Primary Results
Democratic	Anne C. Perry (incumbent)	218	100.00%
Total votes		218	100.00%
Republican Party Primary Results
Republican	John Victor Chambers	353	100.00%
Total votes		353	100.00%

General Election Results
Party	Candidate	Votes	%
Democratic	Anne C. Perry (incumbent)	1,947	52.99%
Republican	John Victor Chambers	1,727	47.01%
Total votes		3,674	100.00%
Democratic hold			

=== District 10 ===
Primary Election Results
Party	Candidate	Votes	%
Republican Party Primary Results
Republican	Kenneth Ralph Davis, Jr.	588	100.00%
Total votes		588	100.00%

General Election Results
Party	Candidate	Votes	%
Republican	Kenneth Ralph Davis, Jr.	2,777	61.07%
Independent	Melissa Louisa Hinerman (Note: The candidate's party was officially listed as "Unenrolled" in Maine election results.)	1,770	38.93%
Total votes		4,547	100.00%
Republican gain from Democratic			

=== District 11 ===
Primary Election Results
Party	Candidate	Votes	%
Democratic Party Primary Results
Democratic	Roland Eben Rogers III	190	100.00%
Total votes		190	100.00%
Republican Party Primary Results
Republican	Tiffany Strout	448	61.71%
Republican	Kendall M. Alley	278	38.29%
Total votes		726	100.00%

General Election Results
Party	Candidate	Votes	%
Republican	Tiffany Strout	3,031	68.02%
Democratic	Roland Eben Rogers III	1,425	31.98%
Total votes		4,456	100.00%
Republican hold			

=== District 12 ===
Primary Election Results
Party	Candidate	Votes	%
Republican Party Primary Results
Republican	Billy Bob Faulkingham (incumbent)	744	100.00%
Total votes		744	100.00%

General Election Results
Party	Candidate	Votes	%
Republican	Billy Bob Faulkingham (incumbent)	2,727	60.16%
Independent	Roy D. Gott	1,806	39.84%
Total votes		4,533	100.00%
Republican hold			

=== District 13 ===
Primary Election Results
Party	Candidate	Votes	%
Democratic Party Primary Results
Democratic	Barbara W. Reeve (Note: After winning the primary election, Reeve withdrew and was replaced on the general election ballot by Democrat J. Mark Worth.)	703	100.00%
Total votes		703	100.00%
Republican Party Primary Results
Republican	John Linnehan	600	100.00%
Total votes		600	100.00%

General Election Results
Party	Candidate	Votes	%
Democratic	J. Mark Worth	2,371	57.90%
Republican	John Linnehan	1,724	42.10%
Total votes		4,095	100.00%
Democratic win (new seat)			

=== District 14 ===
Primary Election Results
Party	Candidate	Votes	%
Democratic Party Primary Results
Democratic	Lynne A. Williams (incumbent)	1,522	100.00%
Total votes		1,522	100.00%
Republican Party Primary Results
Republican	Stephen A. Coston	307	61.52%
Republican	Duncan G. Haass	192	38.48%
Total votes		499	100.00%

General Election Results
Party	Candidate	Votes	%
Democratic	Lynne A. Williams (incumbent)	3,620	66.62%
Republican	Stephen A. Coston	1,814	33.38%
Total votes		5,434	100.00%
Democratic hold			

=== District 15 ===
Primary Election Results
Party	Candidate	Votes	%
Democratic Party Primary Results
Democratic	Holly Eaton	1,071	100.00%
Total votes		1,071	100.00%
Republican Party Primary Results
Republican	Jason Manantan Joyce	427	100.00%
Total votes		427	100.00%

General Election Results
Party	Candidate	Votes	%
Democratic	Holly Eaton	2,865	54.24%
Republican	Jason Joyce	2,417	45.76%
Total votes		5,282	100.00%
Democratic win (new seat)			

=== District 16 ===
Primary Election Results
Party	Candidate	Votes	%
Democratic Party Primary Results
Democratic	Nina Azella Milliken	1,307	100.00%
Total votes		1,307	100.00%
Republican Party Primary Results
Republican	Stephen M. Hanrahan III	483	100.00%
Total votes		483	100.00%

General Election Results
Party	Candidate	Votes	%
Democratic	Nina Azella Milliken	3,396	63.80%
Republican	Stephen M. Hanrahan III	1,927	36.20%
Total votes		5,323	100.00%
Democratic hold			

=== District 17 ===
Primary Election Results
Party	Candidate	Votes	%
Democratic Party Primary Results
Democratic	Pamela W. Person (Note: After winning the primary election, Person withdrew and was replaced on the general election ballot by Democrat Ronald B. Russell.)	368	100.00%
Total votes		368	100.00%
Republican Party Primary Results
Republican	Sherman H. Hutchins (incumbent)	468	100.00%
Total votes		468	100.00%

General Election Results
Party	Candidate	Votes	%
Democratic	Ronald B. Russell	2,398	51.70%
Republican	Sherman H. Hutchins (incumbent)	2,240	48.30%
Total votes		4,638	100.00%
Democratic gain from Republican			

=== District 18 ===
Primary Election Results
Party	Candidate	Votes	%
Democratic Party Primary Results
Democratic	Timothy B. Throckmorton	244	100.00%
Total votes		244	100.00%
Republican Party Primary Results
Republican	Meldon H. Carmichael (incumbent)	660	100.00%
Total votes		660	100.00%

General Election Results
Party	Candidate	Votes	%
Republican	Meldon H. Carmichael (incumbent)	2,697	59.29%
Democratic	Timothy B. Throckmorton	1,852	40.71%
Total votes		4,549	100.00%
Republican hold			

=== District 19 ===
Primary Election Results
Party	Candidate	Votes	%
Republican Party Primary Results
Republican	Richard H. Campbell	728	100.00%
Total votes		728	100.00%

General Election Results
Party	Candidate	Votes	%
Republican	Richard H. Campbell	4,043	100.00%
Total votes		4,043	100.00%
Republican hold			

=== District 20 ===
Primary Election Results
Party	Candidate	Votes	%
Democratic Party Primary Results
Democratic	Kevin J.M. O'Connell (incumbent)	205	100.00%
Total votes		205	100.00%
Republican Party Primary Results
Republican	Jennifer Marie Morin	463	100.00%
Total votes		463	100.00%

General Election Results
Party	Candidate	Votes	%
Democratic	Kevin J.M. O'Connell (incumbent)	2,057	50.65%
Republican	Jennifer Marie Morin	2,004	49.35%
Total votes		4,061	100.00%
Democratic hold			

=== District 21 ===
Primary Election Results
Party	Candidate	Votes	%
Democratic Party Primary Results
Democratic	Barbara A. Cardone (incumbent) (Note: After winning the primary election, Cardone withdrew and was replaced on the general election ballot by Democrat Ambureen Rana.)	427	100.00%
Total votes		427	100.00%

General Election Results
Party	Candidate	Votes	%
Democratic	Ambureen Rana	1,878	58.18%
Independent	Marianna H. Reeves	1,350	41.82%
Total votes		3,228	100.00%
Democratic win (new seat)			

=== District 22 ===
Primary Election Results
Party	Candidate	Votes	%
Democratic Party Primary Results
Democratic	Laura D. Supica (incumbent)	265	100.00%
Total votes		265	100.00%
Republican Party Primary Results
Republican	Douglas K. Damon	193	100.00%
Total votes		193	100.00%

General Election Results
Party	Candidate	Votes	%
Democratic	Laura D. Supica (incumbent)	1,653	58.43%
Republican	Douglas K. Damon	1,176	41.57%
Total votes		2,829	100.00%
Democratic hold			

=== District 23 ===
Primary Election Results
Party	Candidate	Votes	%
Democratic Party Primary Results
Democratic	Amy J. Roeder (incumbent)	431	100.00%
Total votes		431	100.00%
Republican Party Primary Results
Republican	David J. Pece (Note: After winning the primary election, Pece withdrew on September 12, 2022. Since this was less than 70 days before the election, no replacement was allowed under Maine law.)	259	100.00%
Total votes		259	100.00%

General Election Results
Party	Candidate	Votes	%
Democratic	Amy J. Roeder (incumbent)	2,563	100.00%
Total votes		2,563	100.00%
Democratic hold			

=== District 24 ===
Primary Election Results
Party	Candidate	Votes	%
Democratic Party Primary Results
Democratic	Joseph C. Perry (incumbent)	714	100.00%
Total votes		714	100.00%
Republican Party Primary Results
Republican	Roderick Allen Hathaway	301	100.00%
Total votes		301	100.00%

General Election Results
Party	Candidate	Votes	%
Democratic	Joseph C. Perry (incumbent)	2,465	62.58%
Republican	Roderick Allen Hathaway	1,474	37.42%
Total votes		3,939	100.00%
Democratic hold			

=== District 25 ===
Primary Election Results
Party	Candidate	Votes	%
Democratic Party Primary Results
Democratic	Laurie J. Osher (incumbent)	389	100.00%
Total votes		389	100.00%
Republican Party Primary Results
Republican	Cameron S. Bowie	55	100.00%
Total votes		55	100.00%

General Election Results
Party	Candidate	Votes	%
Democratic	Laurie J. Osher (incumbent)	1,842	78.42%
Republican	Cameron S. Bowie	507	21.58%
Total votes		2,349	100.00%
Democratic hold			

=== District 26 ===
Primary Election Results
Party	Candidate	Votes	%
Democratic Party Primary Results
Democratic	James F. Dill	537	100.00%
Total votes		537	100.00%
Republican Party Primary Results
Republican	Christina M. Ouellette	272	100.00%
Total votes		272	100.00%

General Election Results
Party	Candidate	Votes	%
Democratic	James F. Dill	2,419	59.49%
Republican	Christina M. Ouellette	1,647	40.51%
Total votes		4,066	100.00%
Democratic hold			

=== District 27 ===
Primary Election Results
Party	Candidate	Votes	%
Democratic Party Primary Results
Democratic	Julie Vaillancourt (Note: After winning the primary election, Vaillancourt withdrew and was replaced on the general election ballot by Democrat Peter A. Crockett.)	264	100.00%
Total votes		264	100.00%
Republican Party Primary Results
Republican	Gary Drinkwater (incumbent)	651	100.00%
Total votes		651	100.00%

General Election Results
Party	Candidate	Votes	%
Republican	Gary Drinkwater (incumbent)	3,030	69.19%
Democratic	Peter A. Crockett	1,349	30.81%
Total votes		4,379	100.00%
Republican hold			

=== District 28 ===
Primary Election Results
Party	Candidate	Votes	%
Democratic Party Primary Results
Democratic	Natalie D. DiPentino	306	100.00%
Total votes		306	100.00%
Republican Party Primary Results
Republican	Jeffery Allen Gifford (incumbent) (Note: After winning the primary election, Jeffery Gifford died. Irene Gifford was selected to replace her deceased husband on the general election ballot.)	395	100.00%
Total votes		395	100.00%

General Election Results
Party	Candidate	Votes	%
Republican	Irene A. Gifford	2,840	70.93%
Democratic	Natalie D. DiPentino	1,164	29.07%
Total votes		4,004	100.00%
Republican win (new seat)			

=== District 29 ===
Primary Election Results
Party	Candidate	Votes	%
Democratic Party Primary Results
Democratic	Laurie E. York	252	100.00%
Total votes		252	100.00%
Republican Party Primary Results
Republican	Kathy Irene Javner (incumbent)	542	100.00%
Total votes		542	100.00%

General Election Results
Party	Candidate	Votes	%
Republican	Kathy Irene Javner (incumbent)	2,549	58.54%
Democratic	Laurie E. York	1,805	41.46%
Total votes		4,354	100.00%
Republican hold			

=== District 30 ===
Primary Election Results
Party	Candidate	Votes	%
Democratic Party Primary Results
Democratic	W. Louis Sidell, Jr.	208	100.00%
Total votes		208	100.00%
Republican Party Primary Results
Republican	James Lee White	673	100.00%
Total votes		673	100.00%

General Election Results
Party	Candidate	Votes	%
Republican	James Lee White	3,008	66.30%
Democratic	W. Louis Sidell, Jr.	1,529	33.70%
Total votes		4,537	100.00%
Republican hold			

=== District 31 ===
Primary Election Results
Party	Candidate	Votes	%
Democratic Party Primary Results
Democratic	Richard A. Evans (incumbent)	299	100.00%
Total votes		299	100.00%
Republican Party Primary Results
Republican	Chad Richard Perkins	479	100.00%
Total votes		479	100.00%

General Election Results
Party	Candidate	Votes	%
Republican	Chad Richard Perkins	2,108	54.58%
Democratic	Richard A. Evans (incumbent)	1,754	45.42%
Total votes		3,862	100.00%
Republican gain from Democratic			

=== District 32 ===
Primary Election Results
Party	Candidate	Votes	%
Republican Party Primary Results
Republican	Steven D. Foster (incumbent)	498	100.00%
Total votes		498	100.00%

General Election Results
Party	Candidate	Votes	%
Republican	Steven D. Foster (incumbent)	3,195	100.00%
Total votes		3,195	100.00%
Republican hold			

=== District 33 ===
Primary Election Results
Party	Candidate	Votes	%
Democratic Party Primary Results
Democratic	Donovan E. Todd III	183	100.00%
Total votes		183	100.00%
Republican Party Primary Results
Republican	Danny E. Costain (incumbent)	515	100.00%
Total votes		515	100.00%

General Election Results
Party	Candidate	Votes	%
Republican	Danny E. Costain (incumbent)	2,989	71.68%
Democratic	Donovan E. Todd III	1,181	28.32%
Total votes		4,170	100.00%
Republican hold			

=== District 34 ===
Primary Election Results
Party	Candidate	Votes	%
Democratic Party Primary Results
Democratic	Frank Lawrence Roma	121	100.00%
Total votes		121	100.00%
Republican Party Primary Results
Republican	Abigail W. Griffin (incumbent)	513	100.00%
Total votes		513	100.00%

General Election Results
Party	Candidate	Votes	%
Republican	Abigail W. Griffin (incumbent)	2,622	61.65%
Democratic	Frank Lawrence Roma	1,394	32.78%
Independent	Joshua James Pietrowicz (Note: The candidate's party was officially listed as "Compassionate Patriotic American" in Maine election results.)	237	5.57%
Total votes		4,253	100.00%
Republican hold			

=== District 35 ===
Primary Election Results
Party	Candidate	Votes	%
Democratic Party Primary Results
Democratic	Candace T. Augustine (Note: Despite winning the primary election, Augustine withdrew after the deadline during which replacements were allowed.)	255	100.00%
Total votes		255	100.00%
Republican Party Primary Results
Republican	James E. Thorne (incumbent)	732	100.00%
Total votes		732	100.00%

General Election Results
Party	Candidate	Votes	%
Republican	James E. Thorne (incumbent)	3,871	100.00%
Total votes		3,871	100.00%
Republican hold			

=== District 36 ===
Primary Election Results
Party	Candidate	Votes	%
Democratic Party Primary Results
Democratic	Kristen M. Card	292	100.00%
Total votes		292	100.00%
Republican Party Primary Results
Republican	David G. Haggan (incumbent)	539	100.00%
Total votes		539	100.00%

General Election Results
Party	Candidate	Votes	%
Republican	David G. Haggan (incumbent)	2,930	59.69%
Democratic	Kristen M. Card	1,979	40.31%
Total votes		4,909	100.00%
Republican hold			

=== District 37 ===
Primary Election Results
Party	Candidate	Votes	%
Democratic Party Primary Results
Democratic	Margaret D. English-Flanagan	403	100.00%
Total votes		403	100.00%
Republican Party Primary Results
Republican	Reagan L. Paul	515	73.99%
Republican	Kevin J. Kelley	181	26.01%
Total votes		696	100.00%

General Election Results
Party	Candidate	Votes	%
Republican	Reagan L. Paul	2,619	52.21%
Democratic	Margaret D. English-Flanagan	2,397	47.79%
Total votes		5,016	100.00%
Republican gain from Democratic			

=== District 38 ===
Primary Election Results
Party	Candidate	Votes	%
Democratic Party Primary Results
Democratic	Robyn M. Stanicki	247	100.00%
Total votes		247	100.00%
Republican Party Primary Results
Republican	Benjamin C. Hymes	293	54.36%
Republican	Jesse J. Waryck	246	45.64%
Total votes		539	100.00%
Green Party Primary Results
Green	Heather Elizabeth Garrold	37	100.00%
Total votes		37	100.00%

General Election Results
Party	Candidate	Votes	%
Republican	Benjamin C. Hymes	2,155	51.11%
Democratic	Robyn M. Stanicki	1,475	34.99%
Green	Heather Elizabeth Garrold	586	13.90%
Total votes		4,216	100.00%
Republican hold			

=== District 39 ===
Primary Election Results
Party	Candidate	Votes	%
Democratic Party Primary Results
Democratic	Janice S. Dodge (incumbent)	544	100.00%
Total votes		544	100.00%
Republican Party Primary Results
Republican	Stephen J. Hemenway	325	100.00%
Total votes		325	100.00%

General Election Results
Party	Candidate	Votes	%
Democratic	Janice S. Dodge (incumbent)	3,442	68.65%
Republican	Stephen J. Hemenway	1,572	31.35%
Total votes		5,014	100.00%
Democratic hold			

=== District 40 ===
Primary Election Results
Party	Candidate	Votes	%
Democratic Party Primary Results
Democratic	Stanley Paige Zeigler, Jr. (incumbent)	642	100.00%
Total votes		642	100.00%
Republican Party Primary Results
Republican	Tricia M. Harrington (Note: After winning the primary election, Harrington withdrew and was replaced on the general election ballot by Republican Joseph M. McLaughlin.)	436	100.00%
Total votes		436	100.00%

General Election Results
Party	Candidate	Votes	%
Democratic	Stanley Paige Zeigler, Jr. (incumbent)	2,950	58.72%
Republican	Joseph M. McLaughlin	2,074	41.28%
Total votes		5,024	100.00%
Democratic hold			

=== District 41 ===
Primary Election Results
Party	Candidate	Votes	%
Democratic Party Primary Results
Democratic	Victoria W. Doudera (incumbent)	1,276	100.00%
Total votes		1,276	100.00%
Republican Party Primary Results
Republican	Susan Lee Butterworth	333	100.00%
Total votes		333	100.00%

General Election Results
Party	Candidate	Votes	%
Democratic	Victoria W. Doudera (incumbent)	4,083	75.46%
Republican	Susan Lee Butterworth	1,328	24.54%
Total votes		5,411	100.00%
Democratic hold			

=== District 42 ===
Primary Election Results
Party	Candidate	Votes	%
Democratic Party Primary Results
Democratic	Valli D. Geiger (incumbent)	404	100.00%
Total votes		404	100.00%
Republican Party Primary Results
Republican	Roger V. Tranfaglia	198	100.00%
Total votes		198	100.00%

General Election Results
Party	Candidate	Votes	%
Democratic	Valli D. Geiger (incumbent)	2,784	65.54%
Republican	Roger V. Tranfaglia	1,464	34.46%
Total votes		4,248	100.00%
Democratic hold			

=== District 43 ===
Primary Election Results
Party	Candidate	Votes	%
Democratic Party Primary Results
Democratic	Ann Higgins Matlack (incumbent)	647	100.00%
Total votes		647	100.00%
Republican Party Primary Results
Republican	Heather Anne Sprague	353	100.00%
Total votes		353	100.00%

General Election Results
Party	Candidate	Votes	%
Democratic	Ann Higgins Matlack (incumbent)	2,927	59.91%
Republican	Heather Anne Sprague	1,959	40.09%
Total votes		4,886	100.00%
Democratic hold			

=== District 44 ===
Primary Election Results
Party	Candidate	Votes	%
Republican Party Primary Results
Republican	Crystal L. Robinson	544	100.00%
Total votes		544	100.00%

General Election Results
Party	Candidate	Votes	%
Independent	William D. Pluecker (incumbent) (Note: The candidate's party was officially listed as "Independent for Maine" in Maine election results.)	2,372	54.04%
Republican	Crystal L. Robinson	2,017	45.96%
Total votes		4,389	100.00%
Independent hold			

=== District 45 ===
Primary Election Results
Party	Candidate	Votes	%
Democratic Party Primary Results
Democratic	Clinton E. Collamore	590	100.00%
Total votes		590	100.00%
Republican Party Primary Results
Republican	Lynn J. Madison	575	100.00%
Total votes		575	100.00%

General Election Results
Party	Candidate	Votes	%
Democratic	Clinton E. Collamore	2,502	53.23%
Republican	Lynn J. Madison	2,198	46.77%
Total votes		4,700	100.00%
Democratic gain from Independent			

=== District 46 ===
Primary Election Results
Party	Candidate	Votes	%
Democratic Party Primary Results
Democratic	Lydia V. Crafts (incumbent)	957	100.00%
Total votes		957	100.00%
Republican Party Primary Results
Republican	Merle James Parise II	321	100.00%
Total votes		321	100.00%

General Election Results
Party	Candidate	Votes	%
Democratic	Lydia V. Crafts (incumbent)	3,693	65.01%
Republican	Merle James Parise II	1,988	34.99%
Total votes		5,681	100.00%
Democratic hold			

=== District 47 ===
Primary Election Results
Party	Candidate	Votes	%
Republican Party Primary Results
Republican	Edward J. Polewarczyk	508	100.00%
Total votes		508	100.00%

General Election Results
Party	Candidate	Votes	%
Republican	Edward J. Polewarczyk	2,055	40.63%
Independent	Evan C. Goodkowsky	1,773	35.05%
Independent	Leslie T. Fossel	1,230	24.32%
Total votes		5,058	100.00%
Republican hold			

=== District 48 ===
Primary Election Results
Party	Candidate	Votes	%
Democratic Party Primary Results
Democratic	Holly B. Stover (incumbent)	1,033	96.18%
Democratic	Thomas A. Moroney	41	3.82%
Total votes		1,074	100.00%
Republican Party Primary Results
Republican	Tricia L. Warren	458	100.00%
Total votes		458	100.00%

General Election Results
Party	Candidate	Votes	%
Democratic	Holly B. Stover (incumbent)	3,570	63.46%
Republican	Tricia L. Warren	2,056	36.54%
Total votes		5,626	100.00%
Democratic hold			

=== District 49 ===
Primary Election Results
Party	Candidate	Votes	%
Democratic Party Primary Results
Democratic	Allison L. Hepler (incumbent)	577	100.00%
Total votes		577	100.00%
Republican Party Primary Results
Republican	Richard Henry Tetrev (Note: After winning the primary election, Tetrev withdrew and was replaced on the general election ballot by Republican Kelly James.)	410	100.00%
Total votes		410	100.00%

General Election Results
Party	Candidate	Votes	%
Democratic	Allison L. Hepler (incumbent)	3,284	57.64%
Republican	Kelly James	2,413	42.36%
Total votes		5,697	100.00%
Democratic hold			

=== District 50 ===
Primary Election Results
Party	Candidate	Votes	%
Democratic Party Primary Results
Democratic	Sean C. Paulhus (incumbent)	415	100.00%
Total votes		415	100.00%
Republican Party Primary Results
Republican	Jason E. Desjardins	162	100.00%
Total votes		162	100.00%

General Election Results
Party	Candidate	Votes	%
Democratic	Sean C. Paulhus (incumbent)	2,993	70.57%
Republican	Jason E. Desjardins	1,248	29.43%
Total votes		4,241	100.00%
Democratic hold			

=== District 51 ===
Primary Election Results
Party	Candidate	Votes	%
Democratic Party Primary Results
Democratic	Rebecca L. Jauch	481	100.00%
Total votes		481	100.00%
Republican Party Primary Results
Republican	Linda L. Baker	260	100.00%
Total votes		260	100.00%

General Election Results
Party	Candidate	Votes	%
Democratic	Rebecca L. Jauch	3,090	59.08%
Republican	Linda L. Baker	2,140	40.92%
Total votes		5,230	100.00%
Democratic hold			

=== District 52 ===
Primary Election Results
Party	Candidate	Votes	%
Democratic Party Primary Results
Democratic	Seth A. Berry (incumbent) (Note: After winning the primary election, Berry withdrew and was replaced on the general election ballot by Democrat Sally Jeane Cluchey.)	379	100.00%
Total votes		379	100.00%

General Election Results
Party	Candidate	Votes	%
Democratic	Sally Jeane Cluchey	2,504	56.38%
Independent	Peter A. Lewis	1,937	43.62%
Total votes		4,441	100.00%
Democratic win (new seat)			

=== District 53 ===
Primary Election Results
Party	Candidate	Votes	%
Democratic Party Primary Results
Democratic	Jane L. Beckwith	317	100.00%
Total votes		317	100.00%
Republican Party Primary Results
Republican	Michael Lemelin (incumbent)	427	100.00%
Total votes		427	100.00%

General Election Results
Party	Candidate	Votes	%
Republican	Michael Lemelin (incumbent)	2,672	57.61%
Democratic	Jane L. Beckwith	1,966	42.39%
Total votes		4,638	100.00%
Republican hold			

=== District 54 ===
Primary Election Results
Party	Candidate	Votes	%
Democratic Party Primary Results
Democratic	Karen L. Montell	448	100.00%
Total votes		448	100.00%
Republican Party Primary Results
Republican	Charles J. Bussell	378	100.00%
Total votes		378	100.00%

General Election Results
Party	Candidate	Votes	%
Democratic	Karen L. Montell	2,142	49.87%
Republican	Charles J. Bussell	1,987	46.26%
Independent	Nicolas Delli Paoli	166	3.86%
Total votes		4,295	100.00%
Democratic hold			

=== District 55 ===
Primary Election Results
Party	Candidate	Votes	%
Democratic Party Primary Results
Democratic	Daniel Joseph Shagoury	523	56.18%
Democratic	Patrick B. Wynne	408	43.82%
Total votes		931	100.00%
Republican Party Primary Results
Republican	Phillip Ryan Wiseman	469	100.00%
Total votes		469	100.00%

General Election Results
Party	Candidate	Votes	%
Democratic	Daniel Joseph Shagoury	2,781	54.91%
Republican	Phillip Ryan Wiseman	2,284	45.09%
Total votes		5,065	100.00%
Democratic hold			

=== District 56 ===
Primary Election Results
Party	Candidate	Votes	%
Republican Party Primary Results
Republican	Randall Adam Greenwood (incumbent)	529	100.00%
Total votes		529	100.00%

General Election Results
Party	Candidate	Votes	%
Republican	Randall Adam Greenwood (incumbent)	2,449	50.93%
Independent	Kent Ackley (Note: The candidate's party was officially listed as "Your Local Independent" in Maine election results.)	2,360	49.07%
Total votes		4,809	100.00%
Republican hold			

=== District 57 ===
Primary Election Results
Party	Candidate	Votes	%
Democratic Party Primary Results
Democratic	Tavis Rock Hasenfus (incumbent)	620	100.00%
Total votes		620	100.00%
Republican Party Primary Results
Republican	Corey S. Wilson	540	100.00%
Total votes		540	100.00%

General Election Results
Party	Candidate	Votes	%
Democratic	Tavis Rock Hasenfus (incumbent)	2,639	53.90%
Republican	Corey S. Wilson	2,257	46.10%
Total votes		4,896	100.00%
Democratic hold			

=== District 58 ===
Primary Election Results
Party	Candidate	Votes	%
Democratic Party Primary Results
Democratic	Robert Smith Neal	555	100.00%
Total votes		555	100.00%
Republican Party Primary Results
Republican	Daniel J. Newman (incumbent)	622	100.00%
Total votes		622	100.00%

General Election Results
Party	Candidate	Votes	%
Republican	Daniel J. Newman (incumbent)	2,874	52.71%
Democratic	Robert Smith Neal	2,578	47.29%
Total votes		5,452	100.00%
Republican hold			

=== District 59 ===
Primary Election Results
Party	Candidate	Votes	%
Democratic Party Primary Results
Democratic	Raegan French LaRochelle (incumbent)	350	100.00%
Total votes		350	100.00%
Republican Party Primary Results
Republican	James E. Orr	332	62.76%
Republican	Michael Raymond Michaud	197	37.24%
Total votes		529	100.00%

General Election Results
Party	Candidate	Votes	%
Democratic	Raegan French LaRochelle (incumbent)	2,418	60.53%
Republican	James E. Orr	1,577	39.47%
Total votes		3,995	100.00%
Democratic hold			

=== District 60 ===
Primary Election Results
Party	Candidate	Votes	%
Democratic Party Primary Results
Democratic	William R. Bridgeo	272	100.00%
Total votes		272	100.00%
Republican Party Primary Results
Republican	William L. Clardy	238	100.00%
Total votes		238	100.00%

General Election Results
Party	Candidate	Votes	%
Democratic	William R. Bridgeo	2,354	59.70%
Republican	William L. Clardy	1,589	40.30%
Total votes		3,943	100.00%
Democratic win (new seat)			

=== District 61 ===
Primary Election Results
Party	Candidate	Votes	%
Democratic Party Primary Results
Democratic	Amy J. Davidoff	152	100.00%
Total votes		152	100.00%
Republican Party Primary Results
Republican	Richard T. Bradstreet (incumbent)	446	100.00%
Total votes		446	100.00%

General Election Results
Party	Candidate	Votes	%
Republican	Richard T. Bradstreet (incumbent)	2,838	61.95%
Democratic	Amy J. Davidoff	1,743	38.05%
Total votes		4,581	100.00%
Republican hold			

=== District 62 ===
Primary Election Results
Party	Candidate	Votes	%
Democratic Party Primary Results
Democratic	Pamela J. Swift	357	100.00%
Total votes		357	100.00%
Republican Party Primary Results
Republican	Katrina J. Smith	524	62.38%
Republican	Jennifer V. Tuminaro	316	37.62%
Total votes		840	100.00%

General Election Results
Party	Candidate	Votes	%
Republican	Katrina J. Smith	2,666	57.84%
Democratic	Pamela J. Swift	1,505	32.65%
Independent	Lindsey D. Harwath	438	9.50%
Total votes		4,609	100.00%
Republican hold			

=== District 63 ===
Primary Election Results
Party	Candidate	Votes	%
Democratic Party Primary Results
Democratic	Phillip Bloomstein (Note: Despite winning the primary election, Bloomstein withdrew after the deadline during which replacements were allowed.)	183	100.00%
Total votes		183	100.00%
Republican Party Primary Results
Republican	Scott Wynn Cyrway	654	100.00%
Total votes		654	100.00%

General Election Results
Party	Candidate	Votes	%
Republican	Scott Wynn Cyrway	3,728	100.00%
Total votes		3,728	100.00%
Republican hold			

=== District 64 ===
Primary Election Results
Party	Candidate	Votes	%
Democratic Party Primary Results
Democratic	Colleen M. Madigan (incumbent)	182	100.00%
Total votes		182	100.00%
Republican Party Primary Results
Republican	Ruth Ann Malcolm	156	100.00%
Total votes		156	100.00%

General Election Results
Party	Candidate	Votes	%
Democratic	Colleen M. Madigan (incumbent)	2,230	69.10%
Republican	Ruth Ann Malcolm	997	30.90%
Total votes		3,227	100.00%
Democratic hold			

=== District 65 ===
Primary Election Results
Party	Candidate	Votes	%
Democratic Party Primary Results
Democratic	Bruce A. White (incumbent)	237	100.00%
Total votes		237	100.00%
Republican Party Primary Results
Republican	Tammy Brown	211	100.00%
Total votes		211	100.00%

General Election Results
Party	Candidate	Votes	%
Democratic	Bruce A. White (incumbent)	2,055	67.27%
Republican	Tammy Brown	1,000	32.73%
Total votes		3,055	100.00%
Democratic hold			

=== District 66 ===
Primary Election Results
Party	Candidate	Votes	%
Democratic Party Primary Results
Democratic	Alicia Barnes	221	100.00%
Total votes		221	100.00%
Republican Party Primary Results
Republican	Robert W. Nutting	600	100.00%
Total votes		600	100.00%

General Election Results
Party	Candidate	Votes	%
Republican	Robert W. Nutting	2,671	60.13%
Democratic	Alicia Barnes	1,771	39.87%
Total votes		4,442	100.00%
Republican hold			

=== District 67 ===
Primary Election Results
Party	Candidate	Votes	%
Democratic Party Primary Results
Democratic	Robert Sezak	264	100.00%
Total votes		264	100.00%
Republican Party Primary Results
Republican	Shelley J. Rudnicki (incumbent)	478	100.00%
Total votes		478	100.00%

General Election Results
Party	Candidate	Votes	%
Republican	Shelley J. Rudnicki (incumbent)	2,262	55.81%
Democratic	Robert Sezak	1,791	44.19%
Total votes		4,053	100.00%
Republican hold			

=== District 68 ===
Primary Election Results
Party	Candidate	Votes	%
Democratic Party Primary Results
Democratic	Stanley Byron Short, Jr.	178	100.00%
Total votes		178	100.00%
Republican Party Primary Results
Republican	Amanda Noelle Collamore (incumbent)	437	100.00%
Total votes		437	100.00%

General Election Results
Party	Candidate	Votes	%
Republican	Amanda Noelle Collamore (incumbent)	2,366	58.22%
Democratic	Stanley Byron Short, Jr.	1,698	41.78%
Total votes		4,064	100.00%
Republican hold			

=== District 69 ===
Primary Election Results
Party	Candidate	Votes	%
Democratic Party Primary Results
Democratic	Stephen A. Hale	141	100.00%
Total votes		141	100.00%
Republican Party Primary Results
Republican	Dean A. Cray	590	100.00%
Total votes		590	100.00%

General Election Results
Party	Candidate	Votes	%
Republican	Dean A. Cray	2,960	74.50%
Democratic	Stephen A. Hale	1,013	25.50%
Total votes		3,973	100.00%
Republican hold			

=== District 70 ===
Primary Election Results
Party	Candidate	Votes	%
Democratic Party Primary Results
Democratic	Iver W. Lofving	300	100.00%
Total votes		300	100.00%
Republican Party Primary Results
Republican	Jennifer Lynn Poirier (incumbent)	408	100.00%
Total votes		408	100.00%

General Election Results
Party	Candidate	Votes	%
Republican	Jennifer Lynn Poirier (incumbent)	2,007	60.49%
Democratic	Iver W. Lofving	1,311	39.51%
Total votes		3,318	100.00%
Republican hold			

=== District 71 ===
Primary Election Results
Party	Candidate	Votes	%
Democratic Party Primary Results
Democratic	Allison Mary Perkins	229	100.00%
Total votes		229	100.00%
Republican Party Primary Results
Republican	John E. Ducharme III (incumbent)	529	100.00%
Total votes		529	100.00%

General Election Results
Party	Candidate	Votes	%
Republican	John E. Ducharme III (incumbent)	2,693	65.75%
Democratic	Allison Mary Perkins	1,403	34.25%
Total votes		4,096	100.00%
Republican hold			

=== District 72 ===
Primary Election Results
Party	Candidate	Votes	%
Republican Party Primary Results
Republican	Larry C. Dunphy	599	100.00%
Total votes		599	100.00%

General Election Results
Party	Candidate	Votes	%
Republican	Larry C. Dunphy	3,379	100.00%
Total votes		3,379	100.00%
Republican hold			

=== District 73 ===
Primary Election Results
Party	Candidate	Votes	%
Democratic Party Primary Results
Democratic	Vincent Michael House	291	100.00%
Total votes		291	100.00%
Republican Party Primary Results
Republican	Michael Soboleski	418	50.30%
Republican	Nancy J. Bessey	413	49.70%
Total votes		831	100.00%

General Election Results
Party	Candidate	Votes	%
Republican	Michael Soboleski	2,824	57.26%
Democratic	Vincent Michael House	2,108	42.74%
Total votes		4,932	100.00%
Republican hold			

=== District 74 ===
Primary Election Results
Party	Candidate	Votes	%
Democratic Party Primary Results
Democratic	Gregory M. Kimber	329	100.00%
Total votes		329	100.00%
Republican Party Primary Results
Republican	Randall C. Hall (incumbent)	538	100.00%
Total votes		538	100.00%

General Election Results
Party	Candidate	Votes	%
Republican	Randall C. Hall (incumbent)	2,945	62.95%
Democratic	Gregory M. Kimber	1,733	37.05%
Total votes		4,678	100.00%
Republican hold			

=== District 75 ===
Primary Election Results
Party	Candidate	Votes	%
Democratic Party Primary Results
Democratic	H. Scott Landry (incumbent)	284	100.00%
Total votes		284	100.00%
Republican Party Primary Results
Republican	Tiffany E. Estabrook	300	100.00%
Total votes		300	100.00%

General Election Results
Party	Candidate	Votes	%
Democratic	H. Scott Landry (incumbent)	2,513	65.29%
Republican	Tiffany E. Estabrook	1,336	34.71%
Total votes		3,849	100.00%
Democratic hold			

=== District 76 ===
Primary Election Results
Party	Candidate	Votes	%
Democratic Party Primary Results
Democratic	Tamara N. Hoke	222	100.00%
Total votes		222	100.00%
Republican Party Primary Results
Republican	Sheila A. Lyman (incumbent)	358	100.00%
Total votes		358	100.00%

General Election Results
Party	Candidate	Votes	%
Republican	Sheila A. Lyman (incumbent)	2,530	59.63%
Democratic	Tamara N. Hoke	1,713	40.37%
Total votes		4,243	100.00%
Republican hold			

=== District 77 ===
Primary Election Results
Party	Candidate	Votes	%
Democratic Party Primary Results
Democratic	Bonita L. Bishop	282	100.00%
Total votes		282	100.00%
Republican Party Primary Results
Republican	Tammy L. Schmersal-Burgess	384	60.57%
Republican	Jody W. Brown	250	39.43%
Total votes		634	100.00%

General Election Results
Party	Candidate	Votes	%
Republican	Tammy L. Schmersal-Burgess	2,694	66.55%
Democratic	Bonita L. Bishop	1,354	33.45%
Total votes		4,048	100.00%
Republican hold			

=== District 78 ===
Primary Election Results
Party	Candidate	Votes	%
Democratic Party Primary Results
Democratic	David P. Thurston	462	100.00%
Total votes		462	100.00%
Republican Party Primary Results
Republican	Josanne C. Dolloff (incumbent) (Note: After winning the primary election, Dolloff withdrew and was replaced on the general election ballot by Republican Rachel Ann Henderson.)	427	100.00%
Total votes		427	100.00%

General Election Results
Party	Candidate	Votes	%
Republican	Rachel Ann Henderson	2,306	54.84%
Democratic	David P. Thurston	1,899	45.16%
Total votes		4,205	100.00%
Republican hold			

=== District 79 ===
Primary Election Results
Party	Candidate	Votes	%
Democratic Party Primary Results
Democratic	Don R. Berry (Note: Despite winning the primary election, Berry withdrew after the deadline during which replacements were allowed.)	238	100.00%
Total votes		238	100.00%
Republican Party Primary Results
Republican	John E. Andrews (incumbent)	318	50.16%
Republican	Ryan G. Ricci	181	28.55%
Republican	Dannie D. Abbott	135	21.29%
Total votes		634	100.00%

General Election Results
Party	Candidate	Votes	%
Republican	John E. Andrews (incumbent)	3,197	100.00%
Total votes		3,197	100.00%
Republican hold			

=== District 80 ===
Primary Election Results
Party	Candidate	Votes	%
Republican Party Primary Results
Republican	Caldwell Jackson	476	100.00%
Total votes		476	100.00%

General Election Results
Party	Candidate	Votes	%
Republican	Caldwell Jackson	3,722	100.00%
Total votes		3,722	100.00%
Republican hold			

=== District 81 ===
Primary Election Results
Party	Candidate	Votes	%
Democratic Party Primary Results
Democratic	Daniel A. Sipe	376	100.00%
Total votes		376	100.00%
Republican Party Primary Results
Republican	H. Sawin Millett, Jr. (incumbent)	488	100.00%
Total votes		488	100.00%

General Election Results
Party	Candidate	Votes	%
Republican	H. Sawin Millett, Jr. (incumbent)	2,517	54.30%
Democratic	Daniel A. Sipe	2,118	45.70%
Total votes		4,635	100.00%
Republican hold			

=== District 82 ===
Primary Election Results
Party	Candidate	Votes	%
Democratic Party Primary Results
Democratic	Nathan Robert Burnett	288	100.00%
Total votes		288	100.00%
Republican Party Primary Results
Republican	Caleb Joshua Ness	371	100.00%
Total votes		371	100.00%

General Election Results
Party	Candidate	Votes	%
Republican	Caleb Joshua Ness	2,275	50.51%
Democratic	Nathan Robert Burnett	2,229	49.49%
Total votes		4,504	100.00%
Republican hold			

=== District 83 ===
Primary Election Results
Party	Candidate	Votes	%
Republican Party Primary Results
Republican	Donna Dodge	463	68.80%
Republican	Sierra Dyan Scribner	210	31.20%
Total votes		673	100.00%

General Election Results
Party	Candidate	Votes	%
Independent	Walter N. Riseman (incumbent) (Note: The candidate's party was officially listed as "Independent-Unenrolled" in Maine election results.)	2,491	52.00%
Republican	Donna Dodge	2,299	48.00%
Total votes		4,790	100.00%
Independent hold			

=== District 84 ===
Primary Election Results
Party	Candidate	Votes	%
Democratic Party Primary Results
Democratic	Barry F. Powers	373	100.00%
Total votes		373	100.00%
Republican Party Primary Results
Republican	Mark Walker	655	100.00%
Total votes		655	100.00%

General Election Results
Party	Candidate	Votes	%
Republican	Mark Walker	2,720	58.63%
Democratic	Barry F. Powers	1,919	41.37%
Total votes		4,639	100.00%
Republican hold			

=== District 85 ===
Primary Election Results
Party	Candidate	Votes	%
Democratic Party Primary Results
Democratic	Christopher V. Struebing	428	100.00%
Total votes		428	100.00%
Republican Party Primary Results
Republican	Kimberly J. Pomerleau	478	100.00%
Total votes		478	100.00%

General Election Results
Party	Candidate	Votes	%
Republican	Kimberly J. Pomerleau	2,337	54.90%
Democratic	Christopher V. Struebing	1,920	45.10%
Total votes		4,257	100.00%
Republican hold			

=== District 86 ===
Primary Election Results
Party	Candidate	Votes	%
Democratic Party Primary Results
Democratic	Jessica L. Fay (incumbent)	355	100.00%
Total votes		355	100.00%
Republican Party Primary Results
Republican	Gregory E. Foster	340	71.88%
Republican	Karen L. Lockwood	133	28.12%
Total votes		473	100.00%

General Election Results
Party	Candidate	Votes	%
Democratic	Jessica L. Fay (incumbent)	2,421	51.59%
Republican	Gregory E. Foster	2,272	48.41%
Total votes		4,693	100.00%
Democratic hold			

=== District 87 ===
Primary Election Results
Party	Candidate	Votes	%
Republican Party Primary Results
Republican	David W. Boyer	342	100.00%
Total votes		342	100.00%

General Election Results
Party	Candidate	Votes	%
Republican	David W. Boyer	2,434	61.13%
Independent	Mary-Beth H. Taylor (Note: The candidate's party was officially listed as "Unaffiliated Independent" in Maine election results.)	1,548	38.87%
Total votes		3,982	100.00%
Republican win (new seat)			

=== District 88 ===
Primary Election Results
Party	Candidate	Votes	%
Democratic Party Primary Results
Democratic	Kathleen A. Shaw	225	100.00%
Total votes		225	100.00%
Republican Party Primary Results
Republican	Patrick W. Munsell (Note: After winning the primary election, Munsell withdrew and was replaced on the general election ballot by Republican James W. Sorcek.)	272	100.00%
Total votes		272	100.00%

General Election Results
Party	Candidate	Votes	%
Democratic	Kathleen A. Shaw	2,074	50.87%
Republican	James W. Sorcek	2,003	49.13%
Total votes		4,077	100.00%
Democratic gain from Republican			

=== District 89 ===
Primary Election Results
Party	Candidate	Votes	%
Democratic Party Primary Results
Democratic	Adam R. Lee	172	100.00%
Total votes		172	100.00%

General Election Results
Party	Candidate	Votes	%
Democratic	Adam R. Lee	1,342	56.77%
Independent	Benjamin J. Weisner	1,022	43.23%
Total votes		2,364	100.00%
Democratic hold			

=== District 90 ===
Primary Election Results
Party	Candidate	Votes	%
Democratic Party Primary Results
Democratic	Amy Dieterich (Note: Despite winning the primary election, Dieterich withdrew and was originally replaced by Democrat Thomas Fogarty. However, Fogarty then later also withdrew after the deadline during which replacements were allowed.)	367	100.00%
Total votes		367	100.00%
Republican Party Primary Results
Republican	Laurel D. Libby (incumbent)	345	100.00%
Total votes		345	100.00%

General Election Results
Party	Candidate	Votes	%
Republican	Laurel D. Libby (incumbent)	3,075	100.00%
Total votes		3,075	100.00%
Republican hold			

=== District 91 ===
Primary Election Results
Party	Candidate	Votes	%
Democratic Party Primary Results
Democratic	Hildie J. Lipson	308	100.00%
Total votes		308	100.00%
Republican Party Primary Results
Republican	Joshua K. Morris (incumbent)	574	100.00%
Total votes		574	100.00%

General Election Results
Party	Candidate	Votes	%
Republican	Joshua K. Morris (incumbent)	3,014	62.70%
Democratic	Hildie J. Lipson	1,793	37.30%
Total votes		4,807	100.00%
Republican hold			

=== District 92 ===
Primary Election Results
Party	Candidate	Votes	%
Republican Party Primary Results
Republican	Stephen J. Wood	358	55.85%
Republican	Thomas Henry Martin, Jr. (incumbent)	283	44.15%
Total votes		641	100.00%

General Election Results
Party	Candidate	Votes	%
Republican	Stephen J. Wood	3,728	100.00%
Total votes		3,728	100.00%
Republican hold			

=== District 93 ===
Primary Election Results
Party	Candidate	Votes	%
Democratic Party Primary Results
Democratic	Margaret M. Craven (incumbent)	183	100.00%
Total votes		183	100.00%
Republican Party Primary Results
Republican	Robert Andrew McCarthy	144	100.00%
Total votes		144	100.00%

General Election Results
Party	Candidate	Votes	%
Democratic	Margaret M. Craven (incumbent)	2,143	65.82%
Republican	Robert Andrew McCarthy	1,113	34.18%
Total votes		3,256	100.00%
Democratic hold			

=== District 94 ===
Primary Election Results
Party	Candidate	Votes	%
Democratic Party Primary Results
Democratic	Kristen Sarah Cloutier (incumbent)	172	100.00%
Total votes		172	100.00%
Republican Party Primary Results
Republican	Janet Inger Beaudoin	157	100.00%
Total votes		157	100.00%

General Election Results
Party	Candidate	Votes	%
Democratic	Kristen Sarah Cloutier (incumbent)	1,813	59.95%
Republican	Janet Inger Beaudoin	1,211	40.05%
Total votes		3,024	100.00%
Democratic hold			

=== District 95 ===
Primary Election Results
Party	Candidate	Votes	%
Democratic Party Primary Results
Democratic	Mana H. Abdi	131	100.00%
Total votes		131	100.00%
Republican Party Primary Results
Republican	Fred O. Sanborn-Silvers (Note: Despite winning the primary election, Sanborn-Silvers withdrew after the deadline during which replacements were allowed.)	120	100.00%
Total votes		120	100.00%

General Election Results
Party	Candidate	Votes	%
Democratic	Mana H. Abdi	1,854	100.00%
Total votes		1,854	100.00%
Democratic hold			

=== District 96 ===
Primary Election Results
Party	Candidate	Votes	%
Democratic Party Primary Results
Democratic	John V. Myrand (Note: After winning the primary election, Myrand withdrew and was replaced on the general election ballot by Democrat Michel A. Lajoie.)	181	100.00%
Total votes		181	100.00%
Republican Party Primary Results
Republican	Jonathan M. Connor (incumbent)	217	100.00%
Total votes		217	100.00%

General Election Results
Party	Candidate	Votes	%
Democratic	Michel A. Lajoie	2,161	51.44%
Republican	Jonathan M. Connor (incumbent)	2,040	48.56%
Total votes		4,201	100.00%
Democratic gain from Republican			

=== District 97 ===
Primary Election Results
Party	Candidate	Votes	%
Democratic Party Primary Results
Democratic	Scott Newman Gaiason	142	100.00%
Total votes		142	100.00%
Republican Party Primary Results
Republican	Richard G. Mason (incumbent)	301	100.00%
Total votes		301	100.00%

General Election Results
Party	Candidate	Votes	%
Republican	Richard G. Mason (incumbent)	2,157	59.88%
Democratic	Scott Newman Gaiason	1,445	40.12%
Total votes		3,602	100.00%
Republican hold			

=== District 98 ===
Primary Election Results
Party	Candidate	Votes	%
Democratic Party Primary Results
Democratic	Orion Evenstar Breen	338	100.00%
Total votes		338	100.00%
Republican Party Primary Results
Republican	Joseph C. Galletta	262	55.39%
Republican	Guy M. Lebida	211	44.61%
Total votes		473	100.00%

General Election Results
Party	Candidate	Votes	%
Republican	Joseph C. Galletta	2,599	52.16%
Democratic	Orion Evenstar Breen	2,384	47.84%
Total votes		4,983	100.00%
Republican gain from Democratic			

=== District 99 ===
Primary Election Results
Party	Candidate	Votes	%
Democratic Party Primary Results
Democratic	Cheryl A. Golek	614	100.00%
Total votes		614	100.00%
Republican Party Primary Results
Republican	Stephen Warner Davis	257	77.41%
Republican	Michael J. Lawler	75	22.59%
Total votes		332	100.00%

General Election Results
Party	Candidate	Votes	%
Democratic	Cheryl A. Golek	3,034	57.59%
Republican	Stephen Warner Davis	2,234	42.41%
Total votes		5,268	100.00%
Democratic hold			

=== District 100 ===
Primary Election Results
Party	Candidate	Votes	%
Democratic Party Primary Results
Democratic	Daniel J. Ankeles	920	94.36%
Democratic	Andrew Kingman Kaleigh	55	5.64%
Total votes		975	100.00%
Republican Party Primary Results
Republican	Angela D. Lallier (Note: Despite winning the primary election, Lallier withdrew after the deadline during which replacements were allowed.)	128	100.00%
Total votes		128	100.00%

General Election Results
Party	Candidate	Votes	%
Democratic	Daniel J. Ankeles	4,056	100.00%
Total votes		4,056	100.00%
Democratic hold			

=== District 101 ===
Primary Election Results
Party	Candidate	Votes	%
Democratic Party Primary Results
Democratic	Poppy T. Arford (incumbent)	956	100.00%
Total votes		956	100.00%
Republican Party Primary Results
Republican	Ravi Jackson	223	100.00%
Total votes		223	100.00%

General Election Results
Party	Candidate	Votes	%
Democratic	Poppy T. Arford (incumbent)	3,889	72.27%
Republican	Ravi Jackson	1,492	27.73%
Total votes		5,381	100.00%
Democratic hold			

=== District 102 ===
Primary Election Results
Party	Candidate	Votes	%
Democratic Party Primary Results
Democratic	Melanie F. Sachs (incumbent)	698	100.00%
Total votes		698	100.00%
Republican Party Primary Results
Republican	James J. Finegan, Jr.	198	62.26%
Republican	Gina B. LeDuc-Kuntz	120	37.74%
Total votes		318	100.00%

General Election Results
Party	Candidate	Votes	%
Democratic	Melanie F. Sachs (incumbent)	3,693	71.07%
Republican	James J. Finegan, Jr.	1,503	28.93%
Total votes		5,196	100.00%
Democratic hold			

=== District 103 ===
Primary Election Results
Party	Candidate	Votes	%
Democratic Party Primary Results
Democratic	Arthur L. Bell (incumbent)	786	100.00%
Total votes		786	100.00%
Republican Party Primary Results
Republican	William C. Gardiner (Note: Despite winning the primary election, Gardiner withdrew after the deadline during which replacements were allowed.)	324	100.00%
Total votes		324	100.00%

General Election Results
Party	Candidate	Votes	%
Democratic	Arthur L. Bell (incumbent)	4,554	100.00%
Total votes		4,554	100.00%
Democratic hold			

=== District 104 ===
Primary Election Results
Party	Candidate	Votes	%
Republican Party Primary Results
Republican	Amy Bradstreet Arata (incumbent)	524	100.00%
Total votes		524	100.00%

General Election Results
Party	Candidate	Votes	%
Republican	Amy Bradstreet Arata (incumbent)	2,636	52.50%
Independent	Anne B. Gass (Note: The candidate's party was officially listed as "Practical Thrifty Independent" in Maine election results.)	2,385	47.50%
Total votes		5,021	100.00%
Republican hold			

=== District 105 ===
Primary Election Results
Party	Candidate	Votes	%
Democratic Party Primary Results
Democratic	Anne Graham	753	100.00%
Total votes		753	100.00%
Republican Party Primary Results
Republican	David Lawrence Reed	497	100.00%
Total votes		497	100.00%

General Election Results
Party	Candidate	Votes	%
Democratic	Anne Graham	3,084	58.02%
Republican	David Lawrence Reed	2,231	41.98%
Total votes		5,315	100.00%
Democratic gain from Republican			

=== District 106 ===
Primary Election Results
Party	Candidate	Votes	%
Democratic Party Primary Results
Democratic	Jonathan E. Priest (Note: After winning the primary election, Priest withdrew and was replaced on the general election ballot by Democrat Dana Reed.)	397	100.00%
Total votes		397	100.00%
Republican Party Primary Results
Republican	Barbara A. Bagshaw	372	67.76%
Republican	Thomas M. Tyler	177	32.24%
Total votes		549	100.00%

General Election Results
Party	Candidate	Votes	%
Republican	Barbara A. Bagshaw	2,373	50.24%
Democratic	Dana Reed	2,350	49.76%
Total votes		4,723	100.00%
Republican gain from Democratic			

=== District 107 ===
Primary Election Results
Party	Candidate	Votes	%
Democratic Party Primary Results
Democratic	Paul C. Fullam (Note: After winning the primary election, Fullam withdrew and was replaced on the general election ballot by Democrat Jane Pringle.)	366	100.00%
Total votes		366	100.00%
Republican Party Primary Results
Republican	Michael David Hall	344	100.00%
Total votes		344	100.00%

General Election Results
Party	Candidate	Votes	%
Democratic	Jane Pringle	2,349	51.49%
Republican	Michael David Hall	2,213	48.51%
Total votes		4,562	100.00%
Democratic gain from Republican			

=== District 108 ===
Primary Election Results
Party	Candidate	Votes	%
Democratic Party Primary Results
Democratic	Maureen Fitzgerald Terry (incumbent)	302	100.00%
Total votes		302	100.00%
Republican Party Primary Results
Republican	Stephanie R. Cressey (Note: Despite winning the primary election, Cressey withdrew after the deadline during which replacements were allowed.)	247	100.00%
Total votes		247	100.00%

General Election Results
Party	Candidate	Votes	%
Democratic	Maureen Fitzgerald Terry (incumbent)	3,017	100.00%
Total votes		3,017	100.00%
Democratic hold			

=== District 109 ===
Primary Election Results
Party	Candidate	Votes	%
Democratic Party Primary Results
Democratic	James Allen Boyle (incumbent)	467	100.00%
Total votes		467	100.00%
Republican Party Primary Results
Republican	Joseph Edwards Velozo	329	100.00%
Total votes		329	100.00%

General Election Results
Party	Candidate	Votes	%
Democratic	James Allen Boyle (incumbent)	2,987	60.77%
Republican	Joseph Edwards Velozo	1,928	39.23%
Total votes		4,915	100.00%
Democratic hold			

=== District 110 ===
Primary Election Results
Party	Candidate	Votes	%
Democratic Party Primary Results
Democratic	Stephen W. Moriarty (incumbent)	1,054	100.00%
Total votes		1,054	100.00%
Republican Party Primary Results
Republican	Scott William Jordan	464	100.00%
Total votes		464	100.00%

General Election Results
Party	Candidate	Votes	%
Democratic	Stephen W. Moriarty (incumbent)	4,006	69.12%
Republican	Scott William Jordan	1,790	30.88%
Total votes		5,796	100.00%
Democratic hold			

=== District 111 ===
Primary Election Results
Party	Candidate	Votes	%
Democratic Party Primary Results
Democratic	Amy D. Kuhn	1,037	100.00%
Total votes		1,037	100.00%
Republican Party Primary Results
Republican	Christopher Mark Storms (Note: After winning the primary election, Storms withdrew and was replaced on the general election ballot by Republican Jeffrey York.)	395	100.00%
Total votes		395	100.00%

General Election Results
Party	Candidate	Votes	%
Democratic	Amy D. Kuhn	3,927	69.14%
Republican	Jeffrey York	1,753	30.86%
Total votes		5,680	100.00%
Democratic hold			

=== District 112 ===
Primary Election Results
Party	Candidate	Votes	%
Democratic Party Primary Results
Democratic	W. Edward Crockett (incumbent)	932	100.00%
Total votes		932	100.00%
Republican Party Primary Results
Republican	Tammy Ryan	348	100.00%
Total votes		348	100.00%

General Election Results
Party	Candidate	Votes	%
Democratic	W. Edward Crockett (incumbent)	3,781	71.77%
Republican	Tammy Ryan	1,487	28.23%
Total votes		5,268	100.00%
Democratic hold			

=== District 113 ===
Primary Election Results
Party	Candidate	Votes	%
Democratic Party Primary Results
Democratic	Grayson B. Lookner (incumbent)	597	100.00%
Total votes		597	100.00%

General Election Results
Party	Candidate	Votes	%
Democratic	Grayson B. Lookner (incumbent)	3,274	100.00%
Total votes		3,274	100.00%
Democratic hold			

=== District 114 ===
Primary Election Results
Party	Candidate	Votes	%
Democratic Party Primary Results
Democratic	Benjamin T. Collings (incumbent)	632	100.00%
Total votes		632	100.00%
Republican Party Primary Results
Republican	Daniel L. Merrill (Note: Despite winning the primary election, Merrill withdrew after the deadline during which replacements were allowed.)	119	100.00%
Total votes		119	100.00%

General Election Results
Party	Candidate	Votes	%
Democratic	Benjamin T. Collings (incumbent)	3,347	100.00%
Total votes		3,347	100.00%
Democratic hold			

=== District 115 ===
Primary Election Results
Party	Candidate	Votes	%
Democratic Party Primary Results
Democratic	Michael F. Brennan (incumbent)	1,055	100.00%
Total votes		1,055	100.00%
Republican Party Primary Results
Republican	Andrew Thomas Mahaleris (Note: Despite winning the primary election, Mahaleris withdrew after the deadline during which replacements were allowed.)	108	100.00%
Total votes		108	100.00%

General Election Results
Party	Candidate	Votes	%
Democratic	Michael F. Brennan (incumbent)	4,224	100.00%
Total votes		4,224	100.00%
Democratic hold			

=== District 116 ===
Primary Election Results
Party	Candidate	Votes	%
Democratic Party Primary Results
Democratic	Samuel Lewis Zager (incumbent)	1,160	100.00%
Total votes		1,160	100.00%
Republican Party Primary Results
Republican	Dale J. Holman	108	100.00%
Total votes		108	100.00%

General Election Results
Party	Candidate	Votes	%
Democratic	Samuel Lewis Zager (incumbent)	4,007	84.38%
Republican	Dale J. Holman	742	15.62%
Total votes		4,749	100.00%
Democratic hold			

=== District 117 ===
Primary Election Results
Party	Candidate	Votes	%
Democratic Party Primary Results
Democratic	Matthew Moonen	676	100.00%
Total votes		676	100.00%

General Election Results
Party	Candidate	Votes	%
Democratic	Matthew Moonen	3,755	100.00%
Total votes		3,755	100.00%
Democratic hold			

=== District 118 ===
Primary Election Results
Party	Candidate	Votes	%
Democratic Party Primary Results
Democratic	Rachel Talbot Ross (incumbent)	485	100.00%
Total votes		485	100.00%

General Election Results
Party	Candidate	Votes	%
Democratic	Rachel Talbot Ross (incumbent)	2,865	100.00%
Total votes		2,865	100.00%
Democratic hold			

=== District 119 ===
Primary Election Results
Party	Candidate	Votes	%
Democratic Party Primary Results
Democratic	Charles A. Skold	649	54.77%
Democratic	Susanne K. Robins	536	45.23%
Total votes		1,185	100.00%
Republican Party Primary Results
Republican	Peter Ignatius Doyle	63	100.00%
Total votes		63	100.00%

General Election Results
Party	Candidate	Votes	%
Democratic	Charles A. Skold	4,226	87.49%
Republican	Peter Ignatius Doyle	604	12.51%
Total votes		4,830	100.00%
Democratic hold			

=== District 120 ===
Primary Election Results
Party	Candidate	Votes	%
Democratic Party Primary Results
Democratic	Victoria Morales (incumbent) (Note: After winning the primary election, Morales withdrew and was replaced on the general election ballot by Democrat Deqa Dhalac.)	301	100.00%
Total votes		301	100.00%
Republican Party Primary Results
Republican	Michael J. Dougherty	90	100.00%
Total votes		90	100.00%

General Election Results
Party	Candidate	Votes	%
Democratic	Deqa Dhalac	2,470	67.67%
Republican	Michael J. Dougherty	1,180	32.33%
Total votes		3,650	100.00%
Democratic hold			

=== District 121 ===
Primary Election Results
Party	Candidate	Votes	%
Democratic Party Primary Results
Democratic	Christopher J. Kessler (incumbent)	532	100.00%
Total votes		532	100.00%
Republican Party Primary Results
Republican	Tammy Walter	114	100.00%
Total votes		114	100.00%

General Election Results
Party	Candidate	Votes	%
Democratic	Christopher J. Kessler (incumbent)	3,615	75.16%
Republican	Tammy Walter	1,195	24.84%
Total votes		4,810	100.00%
Democratic hold			

=== District 122 ===
Primary Election Results
Party	Candidate	Votes	%
Democratic Party Primary Results
Democratic	Lois Galgay Reckitt (incumbent)	711	100.00%
Total votes		711	100.00%

General Election Results
Party	Candidate	Votes	%
Democratic	Lois Galgay Reckitt (incumbent)	4,074	100.00%
Total votes		4,074	100.00%
Democratic hold			

=== District 123 ===
Primary Election Results
Party	Candidate	Votes	%
Democratic Party Primary Results
Democratic	Rebecca J. Millett (incumbent)	1,086	100.00%
Total votes		1,086	100.00%
Republican Party Primary Results
Republican	Annie Christy	239	100.00%
Total votes		239	100.00%

General Election Results
Party	Candidate	Votes	%
Democratic	Rebecca J. Millett (incumbent)	4,491	74.19%
Republican	Annie Christy	1,562	25.81%
Total votes		6,053	100.00%
Democratic hold			

=== District 124 ===
Primary Election Results
Party	Candidate	Votes	%
Democratic Party Primary Results
Democratic	Sophia B. Warren (incumbent)	744	100.00%
Total votes		744	100.00%
Republican Party Primary Results
Republican	Lisa Markowski	326	100.00%
Total votes		326	100.00%

General Election Results
Party	Candidate	Votes	%
Democratic	Sophia B. Warren (incumbent)	3,609	67.62%
Republican	Lisa Markowski	1,728	32.38%
Total votes		5,337	100.00%
Democratic hold			

=== District 125 ===
Primary Election Results
Party	Candidate	Votes	%
Democratic Party Primary Results
Democratic	Christopher James Caiazzo (incumbent) (Note: After winning the primary election, Caiazzo withdrew and was replaced on the general election ballot by Democrat Kelly Noonan Murphy.)	450	100.00%
Total votes		450	100.00%
Republican Party Primary Results
Republican	Christopher A. Bolduc (Note: After winning the primary election, Bolduc withdrew and was replaced on the general election ballot by Republican Alan R. Livingston.)	285	100.00%
Total votes		285	100.00%

General Election Results
Party	Candidate	Votes	%
Democratic	Kelly Noonan Murphy	2,863	59.63%
Republican	Alan R. Livingston	1,938	40.37%
Total votes		4,801	100.00%
Democratic hold			

=== District 126 ===
Primary Election Results
Party	Candidate	Votes	%
Democratic Party Primary Results
Democratic	Andrew "Drew" Gattine	334	59.86%
Democratic	Jean-Marie Caterina	224	40.14%
Total votes		558	100.00%
Republican Party Primary Results
Republican	Leslie Eugene Smith, Jr. (Note: Despite winning the primary election, Smith withdrew after the deadline during which replacements were allowed.)	215	100.00%
Total votes		215	100.00%

General Election Results
Party	Candidate	Votes	%
Democratic	Andrew "Drew" Gattine	3,186	100.00%
Total votes		3,186	100.00%
Democratic win (new seat)			

=== District 127 ===
Primary Election Results
Party	Candidate	Votes	%
Democratic Party Primary Results
Democratic	Morgan J. Rielly (incumbent)	373	100.00%
Total votes		373	100.00%
Republican Party Primary Results
Republican	Ryan C. Poitras	93	100.00%
Total votes		93	100.00%

General Election Results
Party	Candidate	Votes	%
Democratic	Morgan J. Rielly (incumbent)	2,491	71.77%
Republican	Ryan C. Poitras	980	28.23%
Total votes		3,471	100.00%
Democratic hold			

=== District 128 ===
Primary Election Results
Party	Candidate	Votes	%
Democratic Party Primary Results
Democratic	Suzanne M. Salisbury (incumbent)	400	100.00%
Total votes		400	100.00%
Republican Party Primary Results
Republican	Charles William Ellis	143	100.00%
Total votes		143	100.00%

General Election Results
Party	Candidate	Votes	%
Democratic	Suzanne M. Salisbury (incumbent)	2,879	67.95%
Republican	Charles William Ellis	1,358	32.05%
Total votes		4,237	100.00%
Democratic hold			

=== District 129 ===
Primary Election Results
Party	Candidate	Votes	%
Democratic Party Primary Results
Democratic	Margaret M. O'Neil (incumbent)	453	100.00%
Total votes		453	100.00%
Republican Party Primary Results
Republican	Stephen R. DuPuis	126	100.00%
Total votes		126	100.00%

General Election Results
Party	Candidate	Votes	%
Democratic	Margaret M. O'Neil (incumbent)	2,707	67.56%
Republican	Stephen R. DuPuis	1,300	32.44%
Total votes		4,007	100.00%
Democratic hold			

=== District 130 ===
Primary Election Results
Party	Candidate	Votes	%
Democratic Party Primary Results
Democratic	Lynn H. Copeland (incumbent)	471	100.00%
Total votes		471	100.00%
Republican Party Primary Results
Republican	Theodore L. Sirois	161	100.00%
Total votes		161	100.00%

General Election Results
Party	Candidate	Votes	%
Democratic	Lynn H. Copeland (incumbent)	2,624	61.83%
Republican	Theodore L. Sirois	1,620	38.17%
Total votes		4,244	100.00%
Democratic hold			

=== District 131 ===
Primary Election Results
Party	Candidate	Votes	%
Democratic Party Primary Results
Democratic	Lori Kathryn Gramlich (incumbent)	505	100.00%
Total votes		505	100.00%
Republican Party Primary Results
Republican	Scott B. Eccleston	177	100.00%
Total votes		177	100.00%

General Election Results
Party	Candidate	Votes	%
Democratic	Lori Kathryn Gramlich (incumbent)	3,170	63.92%
Republican	Scott B. Eccleston	1,789	36.08%
Total votes		4,959	100.00%
Democratic hold			

=== District 132 ===
Primary Election Results
Party	Candidate	Votes	%
Democratic Party Primary Results
Democratic	Erin R. Sheehan (incumbent)	241	100.00%
Total votes		241	100.00%
Republican Party Primary Results
Republican	Timothy S. Keenan	67	100.00%
Total votes		67	100.00%

General Election Results
Party	Candidate	Votes	%
Democratic	Erin R. Sheehan (incumbent)	2,182	70.59%
Republican	Timothy S. Keenan	909	29.41%
Total votes		3,091	100.00%
Democratic hold			

=== District 133 ===
Primary Election Results
Party	Candidate	Votes	%
Democratic Party Primary Results
Democratic	Marc G. Malon II	413	100.00%
Total votes		413	100.00%

General Election Results
Party	Candidate	Votes	%
Democratic	Marc G. Malon II	3,331	100.00%
Total votes		3,331	100.00%
Democratic hold			

=== District 134 ===
Primary Election Results
Party	Candidate	Votes	%
Democratic Party Primary Results
Democratic	Traci L. Gere (incumbent)	831	100.00%
Total votes		831	100.00%
Republican Party Primary Results
Republican	Elizabeth A. Jordan	406	73.55%
Republican	Ronald C. Russell	146	26.45%
Total votes		552	100.00%

General Election Results
Party	Candidate	Votes	%
Democratic	Traci L. Gere (incumbent)	3,273	63.06%
Republican	Elizabeth A. Jordan	1,917	36.94%
Total votes		5,190	100.00%
Democratic hold			

=== District 135 ===
Primary Election Results
Party	Candidate	Votes	%
Democratic Party Primary Results
Democratic	Daniel Sayre	852	100.00%
Total votes		852	100.00%
Republican Party Primary Results
Republican	Todd V. DiFede (Note: After winning the primary election, DiFede withdrew and was replaced on the general election ballot by Republican Jared Hayes Hirshfield.)	387	100.00%
Total votes		387	100.00%

General Election Results
Party	Candidate	Votes	%
Democratic	Daniel Sayre	3,530	65.41%
Republican	Jared Hayes Hirshfield	1,867	34.59%
Total votes		5,397	100.00%
Democratic hold			

=== District 136 ===
Primary Election Results
Party	Candidate	Votes	%
Democratic Party Primary Results
Democratic	Joseph Andrew Wagner	340	100.00%
Total votes		340	100.00%
Republican Party Primary Results
Republican	Heidi H. Sampson (incumbent)	449	100.00%
Total votes		449	100.00%

General Election Results
Party	Candidate	Votes	%
Republican	Heidi H. Sampson (incumbent)	2,569	55.35%
Democratic	Joseph Andrew Wagner	2,072	44.65%
Total votes		4,641	100.00%
Republican hold			

=== District 137 ===
Primary Election Results
Party	Candidate	Votes	%
Democratic Party Primary Results
Democratic	Robert W. Faucher	428	100.00%
Total votes		428	100.00%
Republican Party Primary Results
Republican	Nathan M. Carlow (incumbent)	487	100.00%
Total votes		487	100.00%

General Election Results
Party	Candidate	Votes	%
Republican	Nathan M. Carlow (incumbent)	2,758	57.28%
Democratic	Robert W. Faucher	2,057	42.72%
Total votes		4,815	100.00%
Republican hold			

=== District 138 ===
Primary Election Results
Party	Candidate	Votes	%
Republican Party Primary Results
Republican	Mark John Blier (incumbent)	438	100.00%
Total votes		438	100.00%

General Election Results
Party	Candidate	Votes	%
Republican	Mark John Blier (incumbent)	2,434	55.99%
Independent	Michael Thomas Barden III (Note: The candidate's party was officially listed as "A True Independent" in Maine election results.)	1,913	44.01%
Total votes		4,347	100.00%
Republican hold			

=== District 139 ===
Primary Election Results
Party	Candidate	Votes	%
Democratic Party Primary Results
Democratic	Nancy Germaine Piche	196	100.00%
Total votes		196	100.00%
Republican Party Primary Results
Republican	David Woodsome	292	100.00%
Total votes		292	100.00%

General Election Results
Party	Candidate	Votes	%
Republican	David Woodsome	2,573	64.84%
Democratic	Nancy Germaine Piche	1,395	35.16%
Total votes		3,968	100.00%
Republican hold			

=== District 140 ===
Primary Election Results
Party	Candidate	Votes	%
Democratic Party Primary Results
Democratic	Kirstan L. Watson (Note: After winning the primary election, Watson withdrew on September 19, 2022. Since this was less than 70 days before the election, no replacement was allowed under Maine law.)	330	100.00%
Total votes		330	100.00%
Republican Party Primary Results
Republican	Wayne R. Parry (incumbent)	473	100.00%
Total votes		473	100.00%

General Election Results
Party	Candidate	Votes	%
Republican	Wayne R. Parry (incumbent)	2,954	100.00%
Total votes		2,954	100.00%
Republican hold			

=== District 141 ===
Primary Election Results
Party	Candidate	Votes	%
Democratic Party Primary Results
Democratic	John M. McAdam	206	59.71%
Democratic	Patricia E. Kidder	139	40.29%
Total votes		345	100.00%
Republican Party Primary Results
Republican	Lucas John Lanigan	268	100.00%
Total votes		268	100.00%

General Election Results
Party	Candidate	Votes	%
Republican	Lucas John Lanigan	2,219	55.68%
Democratic	John M. McAdam	1,766	44.32%
Total votes		3,985	100.00%
Republican hold			

=== District 142 ===
Primary Election Results
Party	Candidate	Votes	%
Democratic Party Primary Results
Democratic	Joseph Robert Hanslip (Note: After winning the primary election, Hanslip withdrew and was replaced on the general election ballot by Democrat Anne-Marie Mastraccio.)	179	100.00%
Total votes		179	100.00%
Republican Party Primary Results
Republican	Pamela Diane Buck	174	100.00%
Total votes		174	100.00%

General Election Results
Party	Candidate	Votes	%
Democratic	Anne-Marie Mastraccio	1,501	53.55%
Republican	Pamela Diane Buck	1,302	46.45%
Total votes		2,803	100.00%
Democratic win (new seat)			

=== District 143 ===
Primary Election Results
Party	Candidate	Votes	%
Democratic Party Primary Results
Democratic	Wesley John Davie	222	100.00%
Total votes		222	100.00%
Republican Party Primary Results
Republican	Matthew J. Toth (Note: After winning the primary election, Toth withdrew and was replaced on the general election ballot by Republican Ann Marie Fredericks.)	195	100.00%
Total votes		195	100.00%

General Election Results
Party	Candidate	Votes	%
Republican	Ann Marie Fredericks	1,778	52.63%
Democratic	Wesley John Davie	1,600	47.37%
Total votes		3,378	100.00%
Republican gain from Democratic			

=== District 144 ===
Primary Election Results
Party	Candidate	Votes	%
Democratic Party Primary Results
Democratic	Daniel M. Norwood	212	57.61%
Democratic	Corinna Cole	156	42.39%
Total votes		368	100.00%
Republican Party Primary Results
Republican	Jeffrey Sean Adams	515	100.00%
Total votes		515	100.00%

General Election Results
Party	Candidate	Votes	%
Republican	Jeffrey Sean Adams	2,425	61.85%
Democratic	Daniel M. Norwood	1,496	38.15%
Total votes		3,921	100.00%
Republican win (new seat)			

=== District 145 ===
Primary Election Results
Party	Candidate	Votes	%
Democratic Party Primary Results
Democratic	Daniel J. Hobbs	486	100.00%
Total votes		486	100.00%
Republican Party Primary Results
Republican	Timothy M. Roche (incumbent)	421	100.00%
Total votes		421	100.00%

General Election Results
Party	Candidate	Votes	%
Democratic	Daniel J. Hobbs	2,774	51.71%
Republican	Timothy M. Roche (incumbent)	2,591	48.29%
Total votes		5,365	100.00%
Democratic gain from Republican			

=== District 146 ===
Primary Election Results
Party	Candidate	Votes	%
Democratic Party Primary Results
Democratic	Walter Gerard Runte, Jr.	355	56.62%
Democratic	Heath Ryan Ouellette	272	43.38%
Total votes		627	100.00%
Republican Party Primary Results
Republican	Bradley S. Moulton	264	100.00%
Total votes		264	100.00%

General Election Results
Party	Candidate	Votes	%
Democratic	Walter Gerard Runte, Jr.	3,035	58.20%
Republican	Bradley S. Moulton	2,180	41.80%
Total votes		5,215	100.00%
Democratic win (new seat)			

=== District 147 ===
Primary Election Results
Party	Candidate	Votes	%
Democratic Party Primary Results
Democratic	Holly T. Sargent	236	100.00%
Total votes		236	100.00%
Republican Party Primary Results
Republican	David D. Koopman	129	100.00%
Total votes		129	100.00%

General Election Results
Party	Candidate	Votes	%
Democratic	Holly T. Sargent	3,294	66.36%
Republican	David D. Koopman	1,670	33.64%
Total votes		4,964	100.00%
Democratic hold			

=== District 148 ===
Primary Election Results
Party	Candidate	Votes	%
Democratic Party Primary Results
Democratic	Margaret Wheeler	274	100.00%
Total votes		274	100.00%
Republican Party Primary Results
Republican	Thomas A. Lavigne	300	100.00%
Total votes		300	100.00%

General Election Results
Party	Candidate	Votes	%
Republican	Thomas A. Lavigne	2,190	52.99%
Democratic	Margaret Wheeler	1,943	47.01%
Total votes		4,133	100.00%
Republican hold			

=== District 149 ===
Primary Election Results
Party	Candidate	Votes	%
Democratic Party Primary Results
Democratic	Tiffany Danielle Roberts (incumbent)	369	100.00%
Total votes		369	100.00%
Republican Party Primary Results
Republican	Mark A. Rouillard	238	100.00%
Total votes		238	100.00%

General Election Results
Party	Candidate	Votes	%
Democratic	Tiffany Danielle Roberts (incumbent)	2,578	56.06%
Republican	Mark A. Rouillard	2,021	43.94%
Total votes		4,599	100.00%
Democratic hold			

=== District 150 ===
Primary Election Results
Party	Candidate	Votes	%
Democratic Party Primary Results
Democratic	Michele Meyer (incumbent)	600	100.00%
Total votes		600	100.00%
Republican Party Primary Results
Republican	David J. Rumery	391	100.00%
Total votes		391	100.00%

General Election Results
Party	Candidate	Votes	%
Democratic	Michele Meyer (incumbent)	3,232	64.64%
Republican	David J. Rumery	1,768	35.36%
Total votes		5,000	100.00%
Democratic hold			

=== District 151 ===
Primary Election Results
Party	Candidate	Votes	%
Democratic Party Primary Results
Democratic	Kristi Michele Mathieson (incumbent)	548	100.00%
Total votes		548	100.00%
Republican Party Primary Results
Republican	Howard L. Patten (Note: Despite winning the primary election, Patten withdrew after the deadline during which replacements were allowed.)	205	100.00%
Total votes		205	100.00%

General Election Results
Party	Candidate	Votes	%
Democratic	Kristi Michele Mathieson (incumbent)	3,751	100.00%
Total votes		3,751	100.00%
Democratic hold			

== See also ==
- List of Maine state legislatures
