= David Boyer =

American politician

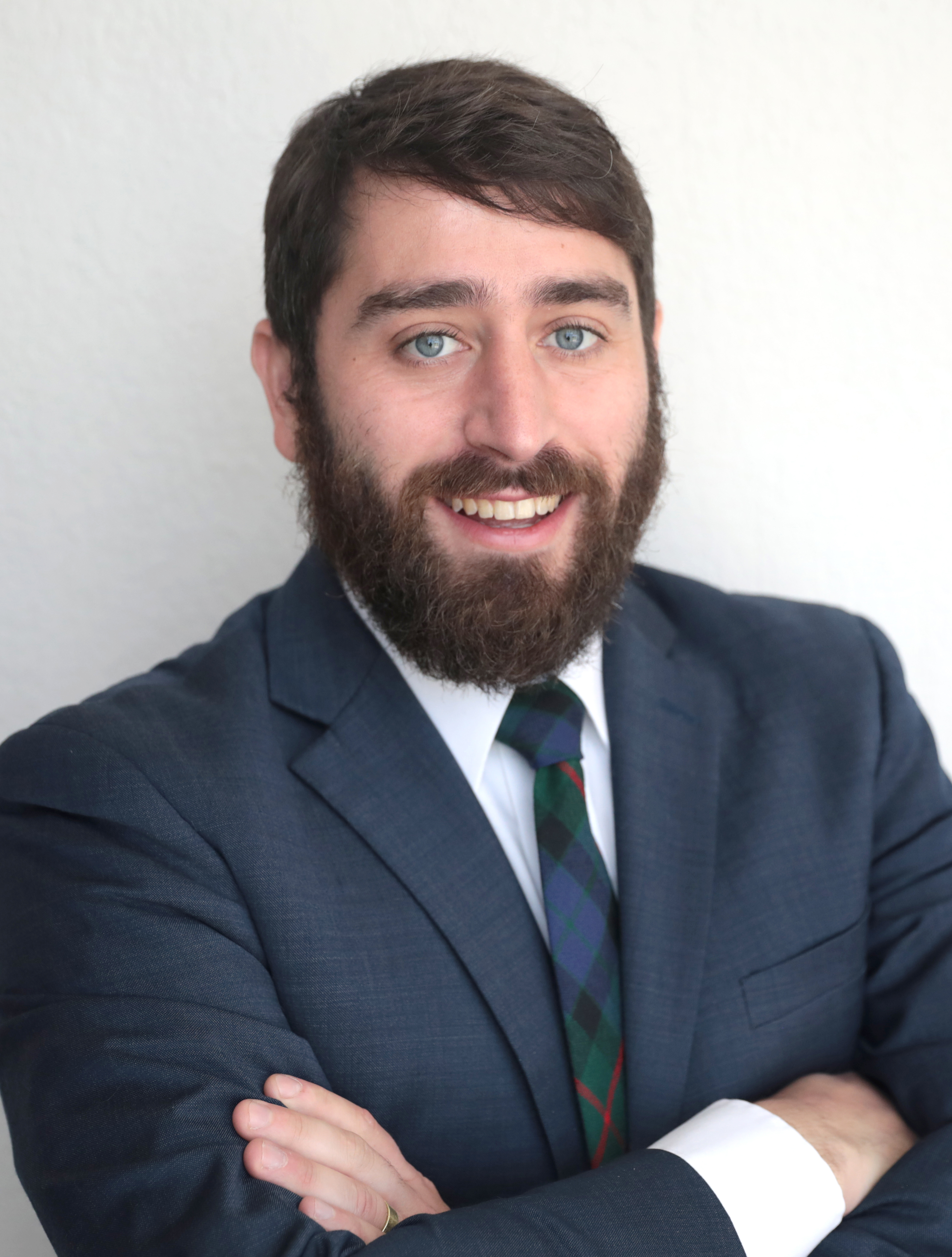

The Honorable

Member of the Maine House of Representatives from the 87th district
- Incumbent
- Assumed office December 7, 2022
- Preceded by: Jeffery Hanley

Personal details
- Party: Republican
- Spouse: Sara McKee
- Children: 2
- Profession: Antique dealer

David Boyer (c. 1961-) is an American politician who has served as a member of the Maine House of Representatives since December 7, 2022. He represents Maine's 87th House district. He is a Republican.

== Electoral history ==
He was elected on November 8, 2022, in the 2022 Maine House of Representatives election. He assumed office on December 7, 2022.

== Biography ==
Boyer is an Eagle Scout.

== Political Positions ==
Boyer introduced a bill in 2024 to lower restrictions and fines and regulate marijuana like alcohol.

Maine House of Representatives
Preceded by predeccesor	Member of the Maine House of Representatives; 2022–present	Succeeded by incumbent
