= Sally Cluchey =

American politician

Member of the Maine House of Representatives from the 52nd district
- Incumbent
- Assumed office December 7, 2022
- Preceded by: Sean Paulhus

Personal details
- Party: Democratic
- Children: 2
- Education: Bachelor of Arts, Master of Science
- Alma mater: Kenyon College, Hood College
- Website: Campaign Personal

Sally Cluchey is an American politician who has served as a member of the Maine House of Representatives since December 7, 2022. She represents Maine's 52nd House district.

== Electoral history ==
She was elected on November 8, 2022, in the 2022 Maine House of Representatives election against Peter Lewis. She assumed office on December 7, 2022.

== Biography ==
Cluchey earned a Bachelor of Arts in classics and classical languages, literatures, and linguistics from Kenyon College in 2001 and a Master of Science in biomedical science and regulatory compliance from Hood College in 2008.

Maine House of Representatives
| Preceded by Sean Paulhus | Member of the Maine House of Representatives; 2022–present | Succeeded by incumbent |
