= James E. Thorne =

American politician

The Honorable

Member of the Maine House of Representatives from the 35th district
- Incumbent
- Assumed office December 7, 2022
- Preceded by: Suzanne Salisbury

Member of the Maine House of Representatives from the 103rd district
- In office December 2020 – December 7, 2022
- Preceded by: Roger Reed
- Succeeded by: Arthur L. Bell

Personal details
- Born: Portland, Maine, U.S.
- Party: Republican
- Spouse: Suzanne
- Children: 2

James E. Thorne is an American politician who has served as a member of the Maine House of Representatives since December 2020.

== Electoral history ==
Thorne was first elected to the 103rd district in the 2020 Maine House of Representatives election. He was redistricted to the 35th district in the 2022 Maine House of Representatives election.

== Biography ==
Thorne served in the United States Air Force from 1983 to 2003. After the Air Force, he works as an advertising sales manager.
