= Barbara Bagshaw =

American politician

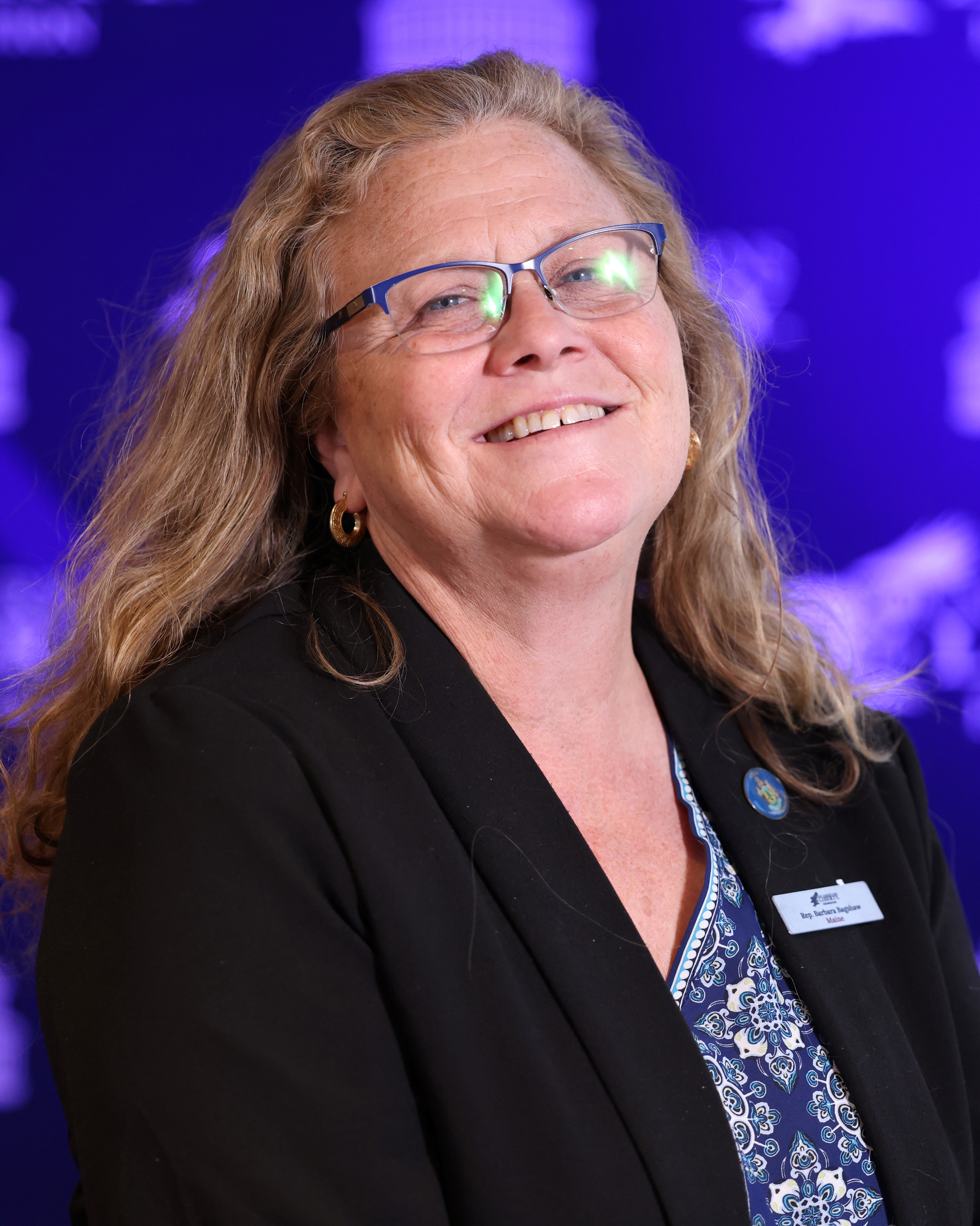
- Bagshaw at the 2024 Hazlitt Summit hosted by Young Americans for Liberty Foundation

Member of the Maine House of Representatives from the 106th district
- In office December 7, 2022 – November 3, 2026
- Preceded by: Amanda Collamore
- Succeeded by: Bradley Youngs

Personal details
- Party: Republican
- Profession: Teacher

Barbara Bagshaw is an American politician who served as a member of the Maine House of Representatives for Maine's 106th House district from December 7, 2022 until her defeat in the November 3, 2026 election to Bradley Youngs.

During the 2025 elections, Bagshaw was the subject of scrutiny when she was found to have been present during the January 6 United States Capitol attack. Bagshaw has denied entering any buildings or participating in any of the violence during the event.

== Electoral history ==
She was elected on November 8, 2022, in the 2022 Maine House of Representatives election. She assumed office on December 7, 2022.

She lost her election to a third term on November 3, 2026.

On November 10, 2026, she officially requested a recount in her loss to Bradley Youngs, claiming too many voters "looked foreign". The recount was held on November 18, 2026 and the results reaffirmed her loss, 51.4% - 48.6%.

== Maine House ==
As a legislator, Bagshaw has advocated for various controversial bills during her tenure. Proposals sponsored or cosponsored by Bagshaw have included the reintroduction of single-use plastic bags, religious exemptions for students from vaccinations, and the abolition of same-day voter registration.

In May 2025, while debating LD 702, which would designate January 6th as a "Day to Remember" in Maine, Bagshaw gave a speech defending her attendance at the Capitol and blamed Capitol Police for inciting violence. She further blamed actors and not supporters of Donald Trump for initiating the riot. Before House Minority Leader Faulkingham successfully got both sides to end the debate, Bagshaw went further to decry that people were arrested and convicted without due process.

Maine House of Representatives
| Preceded by Amanda Collamore | Former Member of the Maine House of Representatives; 2022–2026 | Succeeded by Bradley Youngs |
