= Edward Polewarczyk =

American politician

Edward J. Polewarczyk

The Honorable

Member of the Maine House of Representatives from the 47th district
- In office December 7, 2022 – December 4, 2024
- Preceded by: Arthur L. Bell
- Succeeded by: Wayne Farrin

Personal details
- Born: 1942 (age 83–84)
- Party: Republican
- Spouse: Arlene
- Children: 2
- Education: Bachelor of Science, Master of Business Administration
- Alma mater: Worcester Polytechnic Institute

Edward Polewarczyk is an American politician who served as a member of the Maine House of Representatives. He represented Maine's 47th House district.

== Electoral history ==
He was elected on November 8, 2022, in the 2022 Maine House of Representatives election. He assumed office on December 7, 2022. He lost his reelection bid on November 5, 2024, in the 2024 Maine House of Representatives election.

== Biography ==
Polewarczyk served in the United States Army. He earned a Bachelor of Science in electrical engineering in 1963 and a Master of Business Administration in 1973. He worked on the Space Shuttle program, being a member of the team that brought the first person to the moon. He is a Christian. He is also a member of the school board of St. John's Catholic School.

Maine House of Representatives
Preceded by Arthur L. Bell	Member of the Maine House of Representatives; 2022–2024	Succeeded by Wayne K. Farrin
