= Reagan Paul =

American politician

The Honorable

Member of the Maine House of Representatives from the 37th district
- Incumbent
- Assumed office December 7, 2022
- Preceded by: Grayson Lookner

Personal details
- Born: Maine
- Party: Republican
- Education: Bachelor's degree
- Alma mater: Liberty University

Reagan Paul is an American politician who has served as a member of the Maine House of Representatives since December 7, 2022. She represents Maine's 37th House district.

== Electoral history ==
Paul was elected on November 8, 2022, in the 2022 Maine House of Representatives election. She assumed office on December 7, 2022.

== Biography ==
Paul earned a bachelor's degree from Liberty University. She is a Christian.

Maine House of Representatives
Preceded by Grayson Lookner	Member of the Maine House of Representatives; 2022–present	Succeeded by incumbent
