= Marc Malon =

American politician

Member of the Maine House of Representatives from the 133rd district
- Incumbent
- Assumed office December 7, 2022
- Preceded by: Sarah Pebworth

Personal details
- Party: Democratic
- Spouse: Jennifer
- Children: 2
- Education: Bachelor of Arts, Master of Arts
- Alma mater: American University

Marc Malon is an American politician who has served as a member of the Maine House of Representatives since December 7, 2022. He represents Maine's 133rd House district. Before being elected, he worked with the Maine Democratic Party.

== Electoral history ==
He was elected on November 8, 2022, in the 2022 Maine House of Representatives election. He assumed office on December 7, 2022.

== Biography ==
Malon earned a Bachelor of Arts in political science and public communications in 2005 and a Master of Arts in political science in 2007 from American University.

Maine House of Representatives
| Preceded by Sarah Pebworth | Member of the Maine House of Representatives; 2022–present | Succeeded by incumbent |
