= Mark Babin =

American politician

Member of the Maine House of Representatives from the 3rd district
- Incumbent
- Assumed office December 7, 2022
- Preceded by: Lydia Blume

Personal details
- Party: Republican
- Spouse: Claudette Babin
- Children: 5
- Education: Berean School of the Bible
- Profession: Pilot

Mark Babin is an American politician who has served as a member of the Maine House of Representatives since December 7, 2022. He represents Maine's 3rd House district. Outside of politics, he is a Christian minister and pastor.

== Electoral history ==
He was elected on November 8, 2022, in the 2022 Maine House of Representatives election. He assumed office on December 7, 2022.

Maine House of Representatives
Preceded by Lydia Blume	Member of the Maine House of Representatives; 2022–present	Succeeded by incumbent
