= Daniel J. Newman =

American politician

The Honorable

Member of the Maine House of Representatives from the 58th district
- In office December 7, 2022 – December 3, 2024
- Preceded by: Jonathan M. Connor
- Succeeded by: Sharon Frost

Member of the Maine House of Representatives from the 76th district
- In office December 2020 – December 7, 2022
- Preceded by: Dennis Keschl
- Succeeded by: Sheila Lyman

Personal details
- Party: Republican
- Spouse: Patricia
- Children: 2
- Profession: Fireman

Daniel J. Newman is an American politician who served as a member of the Maine House of Representatives from December 2020 to December 2024.

== Electoral history ==
He was first elected to the 76th district in the 2020 Maine House of Representatives election. He was redistricted into the 58th district in the 2022 Maine House of Representatives election.
