= David Sinclair (politician) =

American politician

Member of the Maine House of Representatives from the 50th district
- Incumbent
- Assumed office November 9, 2023
- Preceded by: Sean Paulhus

Member of Bath city council
- In office 2008–2014

Personal details
- Party: Democratic
- Spouse: Lauren
- Children: Beckett, Ani
- Profession: lawyer

David Sinclair is an American politician who has served as a member of the Maine House of Representatives since November 9, 2023. He represents Maine's 50th House district. Outside of politics, he is a lawyer.

== Electoral history ==
Sinclair served two terms as a member of the city council in Bath, ME from 2008 to 2014. In 2014, he ran for District Attorney of Maine's sixth Prosecutorial District, but lost to Geoffrey Rushlau. On November 7, 2023, Sinclair was elected to the Maine House of Representatives in a special election following the resignation of Sean Paulhus. He assumed office November 9, 2023., and was re-elected in a contested election in 2024.

== Biography ==
Sinclair graduated from Brandeis University and the University of Maine School of Law.

Maine House of Representatives
Preceded by Sean Paulhus	Member of the Maine House of Representatives; 2023–present	Succeeded by incumbent
