= Caleb Ness =

American politician (born 1999)

Member of the Maine House of Representatives from District 82
- Incumbent
- Assumed office December 7, 2022
- Preceded by: Nathan Wadsworth
- Constituency: Brownfield, Fryeburg, Lovell, Hiram, Porter

Personal details
- Born: Caleb Joshua Ness; July 15, 1999 (age 27) North Conway, New Hampshire, U.S.
- Party: Republican
- Education: Hyles-Anderson College
- Occupation: Steel fabricator

Caleb Joshua Ness (/nəss/; born July 15, 1999) is an American politician. He previously served as a member of the Maine House of Representatives for District 82, which encompasses Brownfield, Fryeburg, Lovell, Hiram and Porter, for the Republican Party from 2022 until 2024. At the time, he was the youngest legislator in Maine and among the youngest state legislators in the United States.

== Early life and education ==
Ness was born July 15, 1999, in Fryeburg, Maine to Erick and Melanie Ness. He has one elder sister. His father is a pastor at Center Conway Baptist Church in Center Conway, New Hampshire and also operates Clear View Window Cleaning. His mother, Melanie Ness, works at Christmas Tree Shops and is a church pianist who leads the Junior Church for children. He studied at Hyles-Anderson College, private Baptist college, in Crown Point, Indiana.

== Career ==
He is currently employed as concrete reinforcing steel fabricator.

== Politics ==
Ness had a passion for politics for a long-time and has publicly engaged since 2020. In the 2022 Maine House of Representative election, he won the general election on November 8, 2022. He defeated Nathan Burnett (D) and assumed office on December 7, 2022. His current term expires on December 4, 2024. He currently serves on the Innovation, Development, Economic Advancement and Business committee.
