= Lynne Williams (politician) =

American lawyer and politician

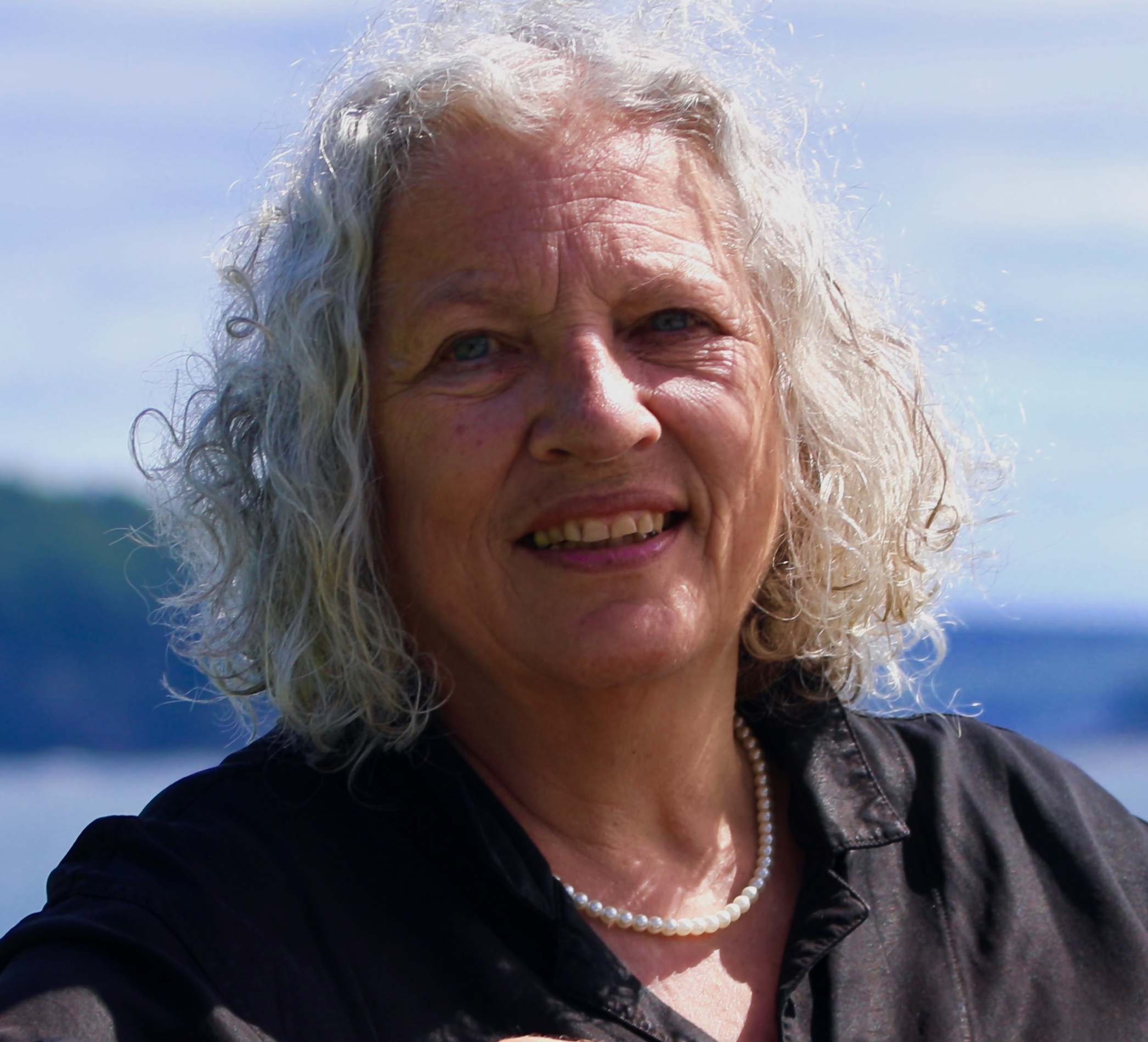
- Williams in 2020

Member of the Maine House of Representatives from the 14th district
- In office December 7, 2022 – April 1, 2024
- Preceded by: Lynn Copeland
- Succeeded by: Gary Friedmann

Member of the Maine House of Representatives from the 135th district
- In office December 2020 – December 7, 2022
- Preceded by: Brian Hubbell
- Succeeded by: Daniel Sayre

Personal details
- Party: Democratic (2011–present)
- Other political affiliations: Maine Green Independent Party (before 2011)
- Education: Merrimack College (BA); City University of New York (MA); University of Southern California (PhD); Golden Gate University School of Law (JD)

Lynne Williams is an American lawyer and politician from Maine. A Democrat from Bar Harbor, Williams represented District 14 in the Maine House of Representatives.

In 2010, Williams sought the Maine Green Independent Party nomination for Governor. However, she was unable to gather enough signatures to make the ballot nor to qualify for public financing. Instead, Williams was the Green Independent nominee for State Senate District 28, which she lost to Brian Langley.

Williams resigned from the Maine House in April 2024 in order to take a government job outside of the legislature.

== Education ==
She earned a Bachelor of Arts in psychology from Merrimack College in 1972, an M.A. in experimental psychology from Graduate Center of the City University of New York in 1975, a Doctor of Philosophy in social psychology from the University of Southern California in 1981, and a Juris Doctor from Golden Gate University School of Law in 1998.

== Electoral history ==
In 2004, Williams sought election to the Maine House of Representatives as a Green, running in District 47, which contained Rockland and Owls Head. She received 12% of the vote, finishing in third behind Democrat Edward Mazurek and Republican Douglas Curtis.

In 2010, Williams — at this point the chairperson of the Maine Green Independent Party — initially sought the Maine Green Independent Party's nomination for Governor of Maine in that year's gubernatorial election, but she ultimately dropped out of the race citing a lack of qualifying signatures. She instead ran in the 2010 Maine Senate election as a Green but lost to Republican Brian Langley, receiving 12% of the vote.

In 2020, Williams — now a Democrat — ran in that year's Maine House of Representatives election to the 135th district, and was elected, receiving 55% of the vote. In 2022, she was redistricted into the 14th district and was elected to it in the 2022 Maine House of Representatives election, receiving nearly 67% of the vote. She did not run for re-election in 2024.

The Maine Supreme Judicial Court in case Docket number Bar-24-2 8 issued an order of suspension dated January 29, 2025, concluding that Attorney William's conduct was an imminent threat to clients, the public and to the administration of justice. Williams is suspended from practicing Law in Maine until further orders from the Court.
