= Michele Meyer =

American politician

Maine House of Representatives
- Incumbent
- Assumed office December 6, 2022
- Preceded by: Roland Martin
- Constituency: 150th district
- In office December 4, 2018 – December 6, 2022
- Preceded by: Mark Lawrence
- Succeeded by: Roger Albert
- Constituency: 2nd district

Personal details
- Party: Democratic

Michele Meyer is an American politician from Maine. Meyer, a Democrat from Eliot, has served in the Maine House of Representatives since 2018.

== Political career ==
Meyer was elected in the 2018 election. She represented District 2, which contained the towns of Eliot, Kittery and South Berwick. She was redistricted to the 150th district ahead of the 2022 election.

Meyer endorsed Amy Klobuchar's presidential campaign in the 2020 Democratic Party presidential primaries.

Meyer has supported the investment into cannabis industry jobs in her district.

Meyer advocated for community engagement alongside social distancing during the COVID-19 pandemic in Maine.

Meyer endorsed Matthew Dunlap in the 2026 United States House of Representatives elections in Maine.

== Personal life ==
Meyer has long lived in Eliot, Maine, and is also a registered nurse.
