= Jane Pringle =

American politician

Member of the Maine House of Representatives from the 107th district
- In office December 7, 2022 – December 3, 2024
- Preceded by: Jennifer Poirier
- Succeeded by: Mark Cooper

Member of the Maine House of Representatives from the 111th district
- In office December 2012 – December 2014

Personal details
- Party: Democratic
- Spouse: James O. Pringle M.D.
- Children: 3
- Education: Bachelor of Arts, Doctor of Medicine
- Profession: Physician

Jane Pringle is an American politician who was a member of the Maine House of Representatives

== Electoral history ==
Pringle was elected to the 111th district in the 2012 Maine House of Representatives election. In the 2014 Maine House of Representatives election, she won the primary but withdrew before the general election. In the 2016 Maine House of Representatives election, she won the primary but withdrew before the general election. In the 2020 Maine House of Representatives election, she won the primary but withdrew before the general election. She was elected to the 107th district in the 2022 Maine House of Representatives election. She was unseated in the 2024 Maine House of Representatives election.

== Biography ==
Pringle graduated from Denison University in 1967 with a Bachelor of Arts in History and a Doctor of Medicine from Case Western Reserve University School of Medicine in 1971, being elected to Alpha Omega Alpha.
