= Kenneth Davis Jr. =

American politician

Member of the Maine House of Representatives from the 10th district
- Incumbent
- Assumed office December 7, 2022
- Preceded by: Wayne Parry

Personal details
- Party: Republican
- Spouse: Karla
- Children: 2

Kenneth "Bucket" Davis Jr. is an American politician who has served as a member of the Maine House of Representatives since December 7, 2022. He represents Maine's 10th House district. He has worked as a maintenance and transportation supervisor.

== Electoral history ==
He was elected on November 8, 2022, in the 2022 Maine House of Representatives election against Independent opponent Melissa Hinerman. He assumed office on December 7, 2022.

== Personal life ==
Davis hunts and fishes in his free time.

Maine House of Representatives
Preceded by Wayne Parry	Member of the Maine House of Representatives; 2022–present	Succeeded by incumbent
