= Allison Hepler =

American politician

Member of the Maine House of Representatives from the 49th district
- Incumbent
- Assumed office December 7, 2022
- Preceded by: Poppy Arford

Member of the Maine House of Representatives from the 53rd district
- In office December 5, 2018 – December 7, 2022
- Preceded by: Jeffrey Pierce
- Succeeded by: Michael Lemelin

Personal details
- Party: Democratic
- Spouse: Rob Stevens
- Education: Ph.D.
- Alma mater: Temple University
- Profession: Professor

Allison Hepler is an American politician who has served as a member of the Maine House of Representatives since December 2016. She currently represents Maine's 53rd House district.

== Electoral history ==
She was first elected to the 2018 Maine House of Representatives election. She was reelected in the 2020 Maine House of Representatives election. She was redistricted to the 49th district and was elected to that in the 2022 Maine House of Representatives election. She was reelected in the 2024 Maine House of Representatives election.

== Biography ==
Hepler earned a Ph.D. in history from Temple University in 1996. She worked as a history professor at University of Maine at Farmington.
