= Richard Evans (Maine politician) =

American politician

Richard Evans is an American physician and politician from Maine. Evans, a Democrat, served in the Maine House of Representatives from 2020 to 2022, representing the 120th district. He is a surgeon at Northern Light Mayo Hospital in Dover-Foxcroft, Maine. He is African-American and became the first Democrat to represent the overwhelmingly white district in 30 years. He served as a member on the Joint Committee on Health Coverage, Insurance and Financial Services.

Growing up in a poor part of Houston, Texas, Evans earned a Bachelor of Science in Microbiology and Chemistry from Howard University and a Doctorate of Medicine from Thomas Jefferson University's Jefferson Medical College. He first moved to Maine to become chief of medical services at Loring Air Force Base, and has lived in Maine since the 1990s.

Evans won a closely divided three-way race in 2020 over Independent incumbent Norm Higgins and Republican Chad Perkins, receiving 1,631 votes to Perkins' 1,520 and Higgins' 1,419. He was the only Democrat to flip a State House seat in the 2020 election, which saw the Democrats lose nine seats.

He was defeated for re-election in the overwhelmingly Republican district, now numbered District 31 following redistricting, in 2022. Perkins was again the Republican nominee. Unlike in 2020, there was no Independent candidate, and Perkins dispatched Evans 2,108–1,754 in the rematch.

In 2024, Evans ran for the Maine Senate in the 4th district. He was defeated by incumbent Republican Stacey Guerin,15,267 votes to 7,926.
