= Meldon Carmichael =

American politician

Member of the Maine House of Representatives from the 18th district
- In office December 7, 2022 – December 3, 2024
- Preceded by: John Tuttle
- Succeeded by: Mathew McIntyre

Member of the Maine House of Representatives from the 137th district
- In office December 2020 – December 7, 2022
- Preceded by: Lawrence Lockman
- Succeeded by: Nathan Carlow

Personal details
- Party: Republican
- Spouse: Vanessa

Meldon "Micky" Carmichael is an American politician who served as a member of the Maine House of Representatives from December 2020 to December 2024. He also started a company called Carmichael Transportation.

== Electoral history ==
He was first elected in the 2020 Maine House of Representatives election, and was reelected to a new district in the 2022 Maine House of Representatives election.

== Political positions ==
Carmichael introduced a bill that would prevent teachers from "engaging in political, ideological or religious advocacy in the classroom". He was advised by the David Horowitz Freedom Center, an anti-Muslim organization.
