= Poppy Arford =

American politician

Member of the Maine House of Representatives from the 101st district
- Incumbent
- Assumed office December 7, 2022
- Preceded by: David Haggan

Member of the Maine House of Representatives from the 49th district
- In office December 2020 – December 7, 2022
- Preceded by: Mattie Daughtry
- Succeeded by: Allison Hepler

Personal details
- Party: Democratic
- Spouse: Loren
- Children: 2
- Education: University of Southern Maine (BA)
- Website: https://arford.mainecandidate.com/

Poppy Arford is an American politician who has served as a member of the Maine House of Representatives since December 2020.

== Electoral history ==
Arford was first elected to the 49th district in 2020. She was redistricted to the 101st district in the 2022 Maine House of Representatives election.

== Biography ==
Arford earned a Bachelor of Arts in social work from the University of Southern Maine in 1981.

In 2023 she was named Legislator of the Year by the Brunswick-based Independence Association.
