= Jessica Fay =

American politician

Member of the Maine House of Representatives from the 86th district
- In office December 6, 2022 – December 3, 2024
- Preceded by: Michael McClellan
- Succeeded by: Rolf Olsen

Member of the Maine House of Representatives from the 66th district
- In office December 2016 – December 7, 2022

Personal details
- Party: Democratic
- Spouse: Kevin Fay
- Education: Simmons University

Jessica L. Fay is an American politician who served as a member of the Maine House of Representatives from 2016 to 2024, most recently representing District 86.

== Electoral history ==
Jessica Fay was first elected to the 66th district in the 2016 Maine House of Representatives election, defeating a three-term incumbent in the election. She was reelected in both the 2018 Maine House of Representatives election and in the 2020 Maine House of Representatives election. She was elected to the 86th district in the 2022 Maine House of Representatives election due to redistricting.

== Biography ==
Fay graduated from Simmons University with a Master of Arts.
