= Victoria Doudera =

American politician and author

Member of the Maine House of Representatives from the 41st district
- Incumbent
- Assumed office December 7, 2022
- Preceded by: Samuel Zager

Member of the Maine House of Representatives from the 94th district
- In office December 2018 – December 7, 2022
- Preceded by: Owen Casas
- Succeeded by: Kristen Cloutier

Personal details
- Party: Democratic
- Spouse: A. Edward Doudera
- Children: 3
- Education: Hamilton College (BA)
- Occupation: Real estate broker; author

Victoria Doudera is an American politician and author who has served as a member of the Maine House of Representatives since December 2018. She currently represents Maine's 41st House district, comprising Camden and Rockport.

A member of the Democratic Party, she serves as House chair of the Environment and Natural Resources Committee and is the founder and co-chair of the Legislature's Gun Safety Caucus. Outside of politics, she has worked as a real estate broker and is the author of multiple books, including the Darby Farr mystery series and non-fiction works about Maine.

== Legislative career ==
=== Committee assignments and leadership ===
Doudera serves as House chair of the Environment and Natural Resources Committee and has previously served on the Energy, Utilities and Technology Committee and the Marine Resources Committee. She also serves on the Maine Climate Council's Science and Technical Subcommittee.

=== Gun safety advocacy ===
Doudera is the founder and co-chair of the Legislature's Gun Safety Caucus and has been a prominent advocate for gun control legislation in Maine. She noted that gun safety was not a popular topic among her colleagues when she first arrived at the State House six years ago, but observed "a gradual, steady change as concerns grew about mass shootings across the country." Following the 2023 Lewiston shootings, Doudera stated that the tragedy "really helped to push people who were on the fence to say, you know, 'Enough is enough.'"

Doudera has sponsored significant gun safety legislation, including LD 759, which became law and requires safe storage of firearms in homes with children under 16, making it a Class D crime for caregivers who act with criminal negligence by storing loaded firearms where children can access them.

=== Environmental legislation ===
As chair of the Environment and Natural Resources Committee, Doudera has sponsored multiple environmental bills. Notable legislation includes LD 1467, which promotes the use of post-consumer recycled plastic content in beverage containers, requiring 25% recycled content by 2026 and increasing to 30% by 2031. She has also passed legislation to prohibit the use of dangerous pesticides, ban the sale of cosmetics tested on animals, and has worked on measures related to greenhouse gas emissions reduction.

== Electoral history ==
She was first elected to the 94th district in the 2018 Maine House of Representatives election, defeating incumbent Republican Owen Casas. She was reelected in the 2020 Maine House of Representatives election. Following redistricting, she was elected to represent the 41st district in the 2022 Maine House of Representatives election and was reelected in 2024, defeating Republican challenger Cory Raymond.

== Writing career ==
Doudera is an accomplished author who has written both fiction and non-fiction works. She is the author of the Darby Farr mystery series, featuring a real estate agent who solves crimes. Her mystery novels include "A House to Die For," which was chosen as a "Best of 2010" by Suspense Magazine, and "Killer Listing." New York Times bestselling author Tess Gerritsen praised "A House to Die For," stating that "Doudera expertly weaves a tale of suspense on a Maine island, where murder and real estate are an explosive combination."

Her non-fiction works include "Moving to Maine: The Essential Guide to Get You There and What You Need to Know to Stay," which has gone through multiple editions, and "Where to Retire in Maine." Doudera has stated, "I never imagined my day job as a top selling real estate agent would lead to my dream job of writing fiction." She is a member of Mystery Writers of America and serves on the board of Sisters in Crime, New England.

== Professional background ==
Doudera works as a real estate broker specializing in coastal Maine properties and was named Realtor of the Year in 2009. She belongs to the National Association of Realtors. Doudera and her husband settled in Maine in 1986 to open a bed and breakfast and raise a family.

== Personal life and community involvement ==
Doudera earned a Bachelor of Arts in comparative literature from Hamilton College in 1983, where she also played field and ice hockey. She is a Congregationalist and is associated with Phi Sigma Iota, an honor society for foreign language studies.

Doudera has served as vice president of Midcoast Habitat for Humanity and serves as Board President of her local chapter. She has three grown children, all of whom attended Camden-Rockport schools, as well as three grandchildren. She has contributed articles to Yankee, Parenting, and other magazines.
