= Corey Wilson =

American politician (born 1985)

Member of the Maine House of Representatives for the 56th District
- In office December 2012 – December 2014

Personal details
- Born: April 30, 1985 (age 41) Waterville, Maine
- Party: Republican
- Education: Park University; Southern New Hampshire University
- Profession: United States Marine Corps veteran and realtor
- Website: Corey Wilson for ME

Corey Wilson (born April 30, 1985) is an American politician and military veteran from Maine. A Republican, Wilson was elected to represent a portion of Augusta in the Maine House of Representatives in the November 2012 general election. He is a veteran of the Iraq War and served in the United States Marine Corps from 2002 to 2010.

During his term in office, he was noted for his service on the Criminal Justice and Public Safety Committee and described as a "maverick worth watching" by the Bangor Daily News.

== Personal life ==
Wilson was born on April 30, 1985, in Waterville and grew up in Albion and Clinton before settling at age 12 with his mother and 5 siblings in Fairfield. He has attended Southern New Hampshire University, where he has studied Healthcare Business. In 2012, he earned a B.S. in business management from Park University.
