= Heidi H. Sampson =

American politician and activist

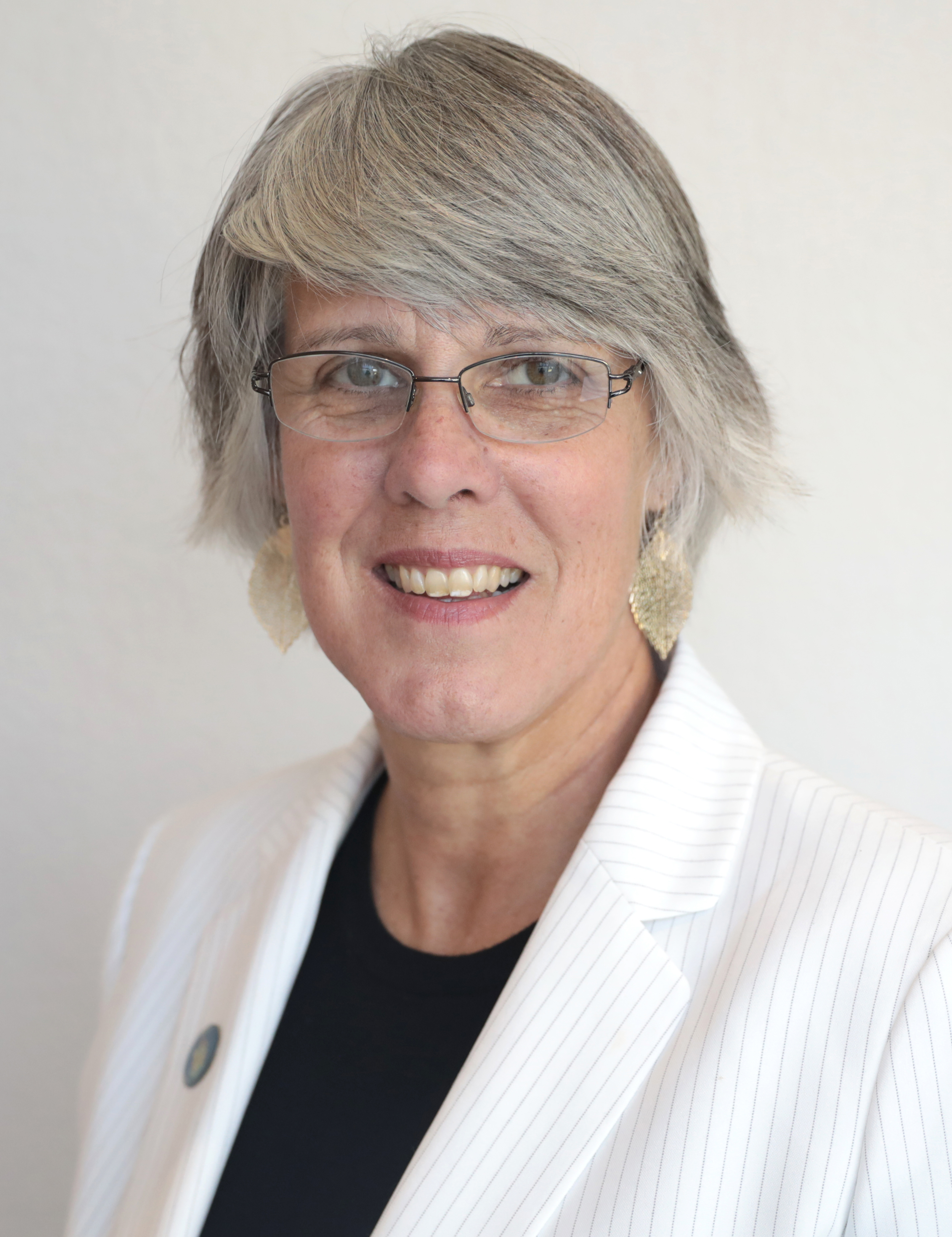
- Sampson in 2022

Member of the Maine House of Representatives
- In office December 7, 2016 – December 3, 2024
- Preceded by: James Campbell
- Succeeded by: John Eder
- Constituency: 136th district (2022–2024); 21st district (2016–2022)

Personal details
- Party: Republican
- Spouse: Robert
- Children: 3
- Education: St. Lawrence University
- Website: heidihsampson.com

Heidi Hilgartner Sampson is an American politician and anti-vaccine activist. A member of the Republican Party, she served as a member of the Maine House of Representatives from 2016 to 2024, representing the 136th district from 2022 to 2024.

Sampson's prominence in the anti-vaccination movement in Maine began with her 2019 opposition toward legislation eliminating religious and philosophical exemptions to childhood vaccinations in the state. Sampson was active in a campaign for a failed people's veto of the legislation, and spoke at anti-vaccine rallies and events throughout the United States. During the COVID-19 pandemic, Sampson was a vocal opponent of public health measures taken to limit the spread of the pandemic in Maine, participating in rallies and demonstrations against business closures, gathering limits, mask wearing and vaccinations. Sampson has made comparisons of vaccine and mask mandates to Nazi atrocities during the Holocaust.

== Early life and education ==
Sampson grew up in a military family and attended Gould Academy, graduating in 1977. She received a Bachelor of Science in 1981 from St. Lawrence University and worked in Maine as a field researcher for the New England Aquarium in 1982-83. In 2012, Maine Governor Paul LePage appointed Sampson to the Maine State Board of Education as a homeschool advocate.

== Maine House of Representatives ==
Sampson first ran for the Maine House of Representatives in 2016, replacing independent incumbent James Campbell, who did not seek re-election. She was re-elected in both 2018 and 2020. During the 130th Maine state legislature (2021-2022) Sampson voted No against issues involving Wabanaki Rights, including LD 906: An Act To Provide Passamaquoddy Tribal Members Access to Clean Drinking Water, and LD 585: An Act To Enhance Tribal-State Collaboration, To Revise the Tax Laws Regarding the Houlton Band of Maliseet Indians, the Passamaquoddy Tribe and the Penobscot Nation and To Authorize Casinos, Off-track Betting Facilities, Federally Recognized Indian Tribes and Certain Commercial Tracks To Conduct Sports Wagering. Sampson did not vote on LD 1626: An Act Implementing the Recommendations of the Task Force on Changes to the Maine Indian Claims Settlement Implementing Act.

=== Anti-vaccine activism ===
Sampson was a prominent opponent of 2019 state legislation to eliminate religious and philosophical exemptions to school-required vaccinations in Maine. In her testimony opposing the bill, Sampson likened childhood vaccination to Russian roulette. When the bill passed into law, she joined state anti-vaccine activists in an effort to collect enough voter signatures for a people's veto of the new legislation to appear on a statewide ballot. The group successfully collected the signatures, and Sampson spoke at a November 2019 "Vaccine Injury Epidemic Event" rally in Washington, D.C. to promote and celebrate the veto's advancement. Sampson herself collected over 1,000 signatures for the veto campaign during the summer of 2019. The veto attempt failed 73%-27%.

Sampson was a headlined speaker at a July 2021 event in Belfast, Maine co-sponsored by conspiracy theorist and Holocaust denier Robert David Steele. During the event, Sampson promoted an audit of Maine's presidential election results and urged attendees to continue participating in protests against COVID-19 mitigation measures such as masking, lockdowns and vaccination. Sampson came under fire from several groups, including a Bangor synagogue, the Anti-Defamation League and a group of 53 of her fellow state legislators, for her participation in an event co-sponsored by Steele.

=== COVID-19 response ===
Throughout the global COVID-19 pandemic, Sampson opposed public health measures implemented in Maine to reduce the spread of COVID-19 in the state. In March 2021, she joined several other plaintiffs in a lawsuit asking a U.S. District Court judge to declare Governor Janet Mills' emergency declarations to be unconstitutional.

Sampson made national headlines after an appearance at an August 2021 rally opposing mandated COVID-19 vaccinations for healthcare workers in Maine. During her appearance, she likened the behavior of state officials, including Mills, to that of prominent Nazis in the Holocaust:

"So we have Josef Mengele and Joseph Goebbels being reincarnated here in the state of Maine. I'll let you figure out who is in what role but I'll just say probably the Mengele...You probably have two by the same last name, of one is the governor."
Representative Heidi Sampson (R-Alfred), Monday, August 16, 2021

In the same speech, Sampson also suggested that the statewide vaccine mandate for healthcare workers violated the Nuremberg Code, comparing it to the Tuskegee Syphilis Study and suggesting that officials behind such mandates can be executed.

== Personal life ==
Sampson lives in Alfred, Maine with her husband Robert. She has three children and two grandchildren. In October 2020, Sampson's neighbors, Sasha and Christopher Malone, filed a lawsuit in York County Superior Court claiming that Sampson and Robert clear-cut more than 4,300 trees from the Malones' property, a protected woodland, and built several structures on the land.

== Electoral history ==
=== 2020 ===
2020 Maine House District 21 Republican Primary
Party	Candidate	Votes	%
Republican	Heidi Sampson	549	100%
Total votes		549	100.0%

2020 Maine House District 21 General Election
Party	Candidate	Votes	%
Republican	Heidi Sampson	3,625	63.9%
Democratic	Clifford Krolick	2,046	36.1%
Total votes		5,671	100.0%

=== 2018 ===
2018 Maine House District 21 Republican Primary
Party	Candidate	Votes	%
Republican	Heidi Sampson	672	100.0%
Total votes		672	100.0%

2018 Maine House District 21 General Election
Party	Candidate	Votes	%
Republican	Heidi Sampson	2,296	52.6%
Democratic	Kelcy McNamara	1,700	38.9%
Green	Justin Reinhardt	369	8.5%
Total votes		4,365	100.0%

=== 2016 ===
2016 Maine House District 21 Republican Primary
Party	Candidate	Votes	%
Republican	Heidi Sampson		
Total votes			100.0%

2016 Maine House District 21 General Election
Party	Candidate	Votes	%
Republican	Heidi Sampson	3,144	60.6%
Democratic	Aaron Carroll	2,042	39.4%
Total votes		5,186	100.0%
