= Charles Skold =

American politician

Member of the Maine House of Representatives
- Incumbent
- Assumed office December 7, 2022
- Constituency: 119th district

Personal details
- Party: Democratic
- Education: Tufts University (BA); Harvard Divinity School (MTS); Harvard Kennedy School (MPA)

Charles Skold is an American politician from Maine. Skold, a Democrat from Portland, Maine, has served in the Maine House of Representatives since December 2022.

Skold grew up in Freeport, Maine, where he graduated from high school in 2007.
