= Arthur L. Bell =

American politician

Member of the Maine House of Representatives from the 103rd district
- Incumbent
- Assumed office December 7, 2022
- Preceded by: James E. Thorne

Member of the Maine House of Representatives from the 47th district
- In office December 2020 – December 7, 2022
- Preceded by: Janice Cooper
- Succeeded by: Ed Polewarczyk

Personal details
- Party: Democratic
- Spouse: Robin Hodgskin
- Children: 3
- Education: Bachelor of Arts, Master of Business Administration
- Alma mater: Colby College, University of Pennsylvania

Arthur L. Bell is an American politician who has served as a member of the Maine House of Representatives since December 2020. Before politics, he worked in corporate finance.

== Electoral history ==
He was elected to the 47th district in the 2020 Maine House of Representatives election. He was redistricted to the 103rd district and elected to it in the 2022 Maine House of Representatives election.

As of 2025, Bell is serving his third consecutive term in the Maine House of Representatives, having served in the 130th, 131st, and 132nd Legislatures. He represents Yarmouth and serves on the Environment and Natural Resources Committee.

During his legislative tenure, Bell has sponsored and supported legislation concerning environmental policy, electoral reform, housing, and community development. In 2024, he sponsored LD 1578, a bill proposing that Maine join the National Popular Vote Interstate Compact.

== Biography ==
Bell earned a Bachelor of Arts in math and economics from Colby College in 1974 and a Master of Business Administration from the University of Pennsylvania in 1976.
