= Ralph Tucker (politician) =

Ralph Tucker is an American politician in the Democratic party. He graduated from Hobart College, and earned a JD from the University of Maine School of Law. He represented the 50th district in the Maine House of Representatives for four terms from 2014 to 2022. While in office he chaired the Environment and Natural Resources Committee, and the Ethics Committee.
