= Sheila Lyman =

American politician

Member of the Maine House of Representatives from the 76th district
- Incumbent
- Assumed office December 7, 2022
- Preceded by: Daniel J. Newman

Personal details
- Party: Republican
- Education: University of Maine at Farmington

Sheila A. Lyman is an American politician who has served as a member of the Maine House of Representatives since December 7, 2022. She represents Maine's 76th House district.

Lyman is a schoolteacher by profession. Lyman submitted a "988 suicide hotline bill".
