= Raegan LaRochelle =

American politician

Member of the Maine House of Representatives
- Incumbent
- Assumed office November 10, 2021
- Preceded by: Justin Fecteau
- Constituency: 86th district (2021–2022); 59th district (2022–present)

Personal details
- Party: Democratic

Raegan LaRochelle is an American politician from the state of Maine. She is a member of the Maine House of Representatives and former member of the Augusta City Council.

LaRochelle took office as the at-large councillor on the Augusta city council in January 2020. She ran in the special election to succeed Justin Fecteau, a Republican in the 86th district, and defeated James Orr, a Republican, in the election on November 2, 2021.

== Electoral history ==
2021 Maine House of Representatives 86th district special election
Party	Candidate	Votes	%	±%
Democratic	Raegan LaRochelle	1,372	56.16%	+13.16%
Republican	James Orr	1,071	43.83%	−13.17%
Total votes		2,443	100%	
Democratic gain from Republican				
