= Suzanne Salisbury =

American politician

Suzanne (Sue) Salisbury is an American politician from Maine. Salisbury, a Democrat from Westbrook, Maine, is a member of the Maine House of Representatives. She represents the 128th House District, and serves on the State and Local Government Committee as the House Chair. She owns a coffee shop and is the former Chair of the School Committee . Salisbury also runs the Westbrook Families Feeding Families food pantry which was started by her and her mother.
