= Jeffery Hanley =

American politician

Jeffery Hanley is an American politician from Maine. A resident of Pittston, Maine, Hanley is a former state legislator who served in the Maine House of Representatives from 2014 to 2022. He is a Republican.
