= Grayson Lookner =

American politician

Member of the Maine House of Representatives
- Incumbent
- Assumed office December 7, 2022
- Preceded by: District created
- Constituency: 113th district
- In office December 2, 2020 – December 7, 2022
- Preceded by: Richard Farnsworth
- Succeeded by: None
- Constituency: 37th district

Personal details
- Born: Camden, Maine, U.S.
- Party: Democratic
- Other political affiliations: Democratic Socialists of America
- Education: Prescott College (BA)

Grayson B. Lookner is an American politician who has served as a member of the Maine House of Representatives since 2020. He represents the 113th (formerly 37th) House District as a member of the Democratic Party. Lookner is a member of Democratic Socialists of America.

Lookner serves on the Criminal Justice and Public Safety Committee, and on the Joint Select Committee on Housing. in his first term introduced legislation to regulate the use of facial surveillance technology by authorities, as well as a bill that would have closed Long Creek Youth Development Center, Maine's last remaining Youth Prison. Both bills passed both chambers of the Legislature, but the bill to close Long Creek was vetoed by Governor Janet Mills.

== Early life and education ==
Raised in Camden, Maine, Lookner attended Prescott College.

== Career ==
After college, he worked in healthcare, wilderness guiding, and community organizing. He worked in progressive political organizations and for the Bernie Sanders presidential campaigns in 2016 and 2020.

== See also ==
- List of Democratic Socialists of America who have held office in the United States
