= Sean Paulhus =

American politician

Member of the Maine House of Representatives
- In office April 2019 – July 14, 2023
- Preceded by: Jennifer DeChant
- Succeeded by: David Sinclair
- Constituency: 52nd district (2019–2022); 50th district (2022–2023)

Personal details
- Party: Democrat

Sean Paulhus is an American politician from the state of Maine. He is a former member of the Maine House of Representatives representing District 50. Prior to redistricting he represented District 52. He is a member of the Maine Democratic Party.

Paulhus served as a city councillor for Bath, Maine. He won a special election to the Maine House of Representatives for the 52nd district on April 2, 2019.

Paulhaus resigned on July 14, 2023, to become register of probate of Sagadahoc County.
