= Sarah Pebworth =

American politician

Sarah Pebworth is an American politician. She earned a BS in education from the University of Wisconsin, and a master's degree in education from the University of Massachusetts Amherst. Pebworth served two terms in the Maine House of Representatives from 2018 to 2022.

== Electoral history ==
General election for Maine House of Representatives, 2018
Party	Candidate	Votes	%
Democratic	Sarah Pebworth	3,039	63.3%
Republican	Nancy Colwell	1,759	36.7%

General election for Maine House of Representatives, 2020
Party	Candidate	Votes	%
Democratic	Sarah Pebworth (unopposed)	4,497	100%

Pebworth did not run for re-election in 2022.
