= Amanda Collamore =

American politician

Member of the Maine House of Representatives from the 68th district
- Incumbent
- Assumed office December 2, 2020
- Preceded by: Scott Strom

Personal details
- Born: Waterville, Maine
- Party: Republican
- Education: Kennebec Valley Community College and University of Maine

Amanda Noelle Collamore is an American politician who has served as a member of the Maine House of Representatives since 2020. She represents Maine's 68th House district.

She was a member of Pittsfield Town Council.
