= Lydia Blume =

American politician from Maine

Member of the Maine House of Representatives from the 3rd district
- In office December 3, 2014 – December 7, 2022
- Succeeded by: Gregory Swallow

Personal details
- Party: Democratic

Lydia Blume is an American politician from Maine. Blume, a Democrat from York, Maine, served in the Maine House of Representatives for District 3 from December 2014 to December 2022.

In October 2014, Blume was endorsed by former State Senator Peter Bowman.
