= 2018 Maine House of Representatives election =

- November 6, 2018

All 151 seats in the Maine House of Representatives 76 seats needed for a majority

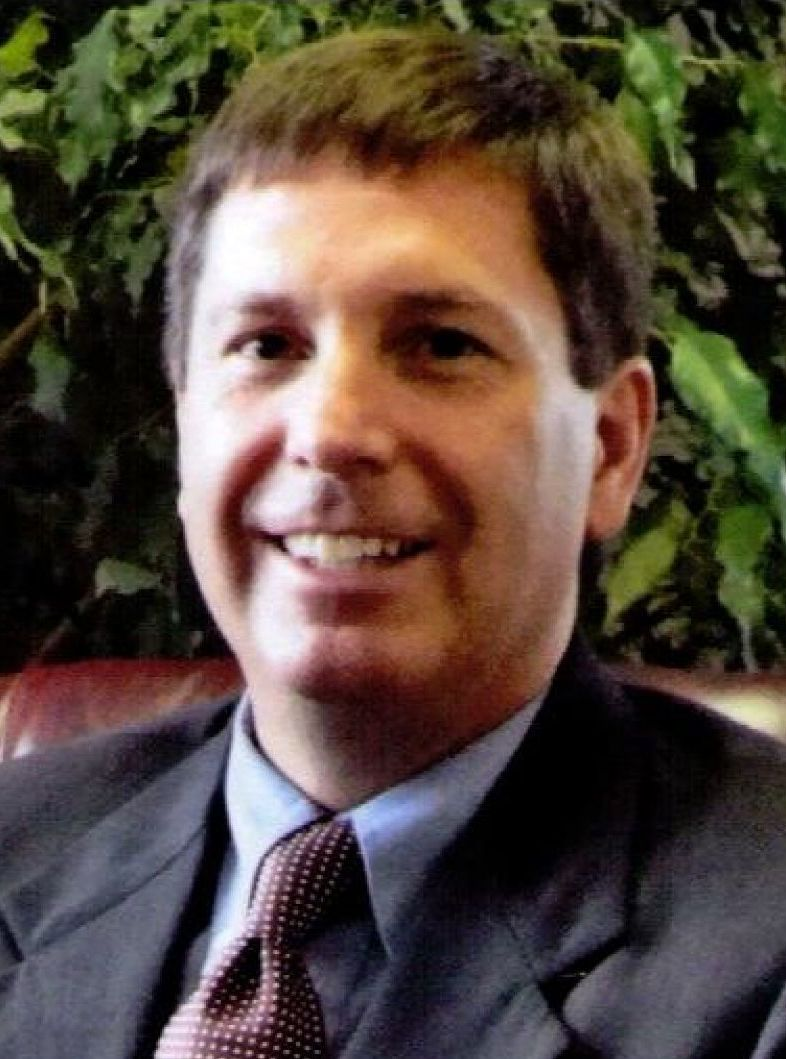

	Majority party	Minority party
Leader	Sara Gideon	Kenneth Fredette (term limited)
Party	Democratic	Republican
Leader's seat	48th	100th
Last election	77	72
Seats before	73	70
Seats won	89	57
Seat change	▲16	▼13
Popular vote	324,088	264,282
Percentage	52.68%	42.96%
Swing	▲1.57%	▼3.75%
	Third party	Fourth party
Leader	none	Jon Olsen & Niomi Larrivee (co-chairs)
Party	Independent	Green Independent
Leader's seat	none	none
Last election	2	0
Seats before	6	1
Seats won	5	0
Seat change	▼1	▼1
Popular vote	24,233	2,365
Percentage	3.94%	0.38%
Swing	▲1.76%	▲0.38%
- Results: Republican hold Republican gain Democratic hold Democratic gain Independent hold Independent gain
Speaker before election
Sara Gideon
Democratic
Elected Speaker
Sara Gideon
Democratic

The 2018 Maine House of Representatives elections took place as part of the biennial United States elections. Maine voters elected state representatives in all 151 of the state house's districts, as well as non-voting members from the Passamaquoddy Tribe and the Houlton Band of Maliseet Indians. State representatives serve two-year terms in the Maine State House.

A primary election on June 12, 2018, determined which candidates appeared on the November 6 general election ballot. Primary election results can be obtained from the Maine Secretary of State's website.

Following the 2016 state house elections, Democrats maintained effective control of the House with 77 members and two coalition Green representatives. Republicans held 72 seats following the 2016 elections. Following several vacancies and replacements between 2016 and 2018, on election day 2018, the Democrats had increased their majority to 74 Democrats, one Green, and six Independent representatives, while the Republicans had decreased from 72 to 70 seats.

The Maine Secretary of State provides both a detailed description of each house seat as well as maps for each district, including this statewide House map showing all 151 House districts.

The Democrats gained sixteen seats in the election, and the Republicans lost thirteen. The sole Green member — Ralph Chapman — was replaced by a Democrat, and the number of independents was reduced from six to five, with only two independent incumbents — Kent Ackley and Norman Higgins — being re-elected.

== Summary of results by State House district ==
Italics denote an open seat held by the incumbent party; bold text denotes a gain for a party.

State House district	Incumbent	Party	Elected representative	Party
1st	Deane Rykerson	Dem	Deane Rykerson	Dem
2nd	Mark W. Lawrence	Dem	Michele Meyer	Dem
3rd	Lydia Blume	Dem	Lydia Blume	Dem
4th	Patricia Hymanson	Dem	Patricia Hymanson	Dem
5th	Beth O'Connor	Rep	Beth O'Connor	Rep
6th	Jennifer Parker	Dem	Tiffany Roberts-Lovell	Dem
7th	Robert A. Foley	Rep	**Daniel Hobbs**	**Dem**
8th	Christopher Babbidge	Dem	Christopher Babbidge	Dem
9th	H. Stedman Seavey	Rep	**Diane Denk**	**Dem**
10th	Wayne Parry	Rep	**Henry Ingwersen**	**Dem**
11th	Ryan Fecteau	Dem	Ryan Fecteau	Dem
12th	Martin J. Grohman	Ind	**Victoria Foley**	**Dem**
13th	George W. Hogan	Dem	Lori Gramlich	Dem
14th	Donna Bailey	Dem	Donna Bailey	Dem
15th	Margaret M. O'Neil	Dem	Margaret M. O'Neil	Dem
16th	Donald G. Marean	Rep	Donald G. Marean	Rep
17th	Dwayne W. Prescott	Rep	Dwayne W. Prescott	Rep
18th	Anne-Marie Mastraccio	Dem	Anne-Marie Mastraccio	Dem
19th	Matthew Harrington	Rep	Matthew Harrington	Rep
20th	Karen Gerrish	Rep	Theodore Kryzak	Rep
21st	Heidi H. Sampson	Rep	Heidi H. Sampson	Rep
22nd	Jonathan L. Kinney	Rep	Mark Blier	Rep
23rd	Lester Ordway	Rep	Lester Ordway	Rep
24th	Mark Bryant	Dem	Mark Bryant	Dem
25th	Patrick Corey	Rep	Patrick Corey	Rep
26th	Maureen Fitzgerald Terry	Dem	Maureen Fitzgerald Terry	Dem
27th	Andrew McLean	Dem	Andrew McLean	Dem
28th	Heather Sirocki	Rep	**Christopher Caiazzo**	**Dem**
29th	Karen Vachon	Rep	**Shawn Babine**	**Dem**
30th	Kimberly J. Monaghan	Dem	Anne Carney	Dem
31st	Lois Galgay Reckitt	Dem	Lois Galgay Reckitt	Dem
32nd	Scott Hamann	Dem	Christopher Kessler	Dem
33rd	Kevin Battle	Ind	**Victoria Morales**	**Dem**
34th	Andrew Gattine	Dem	Andrew Gattine	Dem
35th	Dillon Bates	Dem	Ann Peoples	Dem
36th	Denise Harlow	Ind	**Michael Brennan**	**Dem**
37th	Richard Farnsworth	Dem	Richard Farnsworth	Dem
38th	Matthew Moonen	Dem	Matthew Moonen	Dem
39th	Michael A. Sylvester	Dem	Michael A. Sylvester	Dem
40th	Rachel Talbot Ross	Dem	Rachel Talbot Ross	Dem
41st	Erik Jorgensen	Dem	Erik Jorgensen	Dem
42nd	Benjamin Collings	Dem	Benjamin Collings	Dem
43rd	Heather B. Sanborn	Dem	W. Edward Crockett	Dem
44th	Teresa Pierce	Dem	Teresa Pierce	Dem
45th	Dale J. Denno	Dem	Dale J. Denno	Dem
46th	Paul Chace	Rep	**Braden Sharpe**	**Dem**
47th	Janice Cooper	Dem	Janice Cooper	Dem
48th	Sara Gideon	Dem	Sara Gideon	Dem
49th	Mattie Daughtry	Dem	Mattie Daughtry	Dem
50th	Ralph Tucker	Dem	Ralph Tucker	Dem
51st	Joyce McCreight	Dem	Joyce McCreight	Dem
52nd	Jennifer DeChant	Dem	Jennifer DeChant	Dem
53rd	Jeffrey Pierce	Rep	**Allison Hepler**	**Dem**
54th	Denise Tepler	Dem	Denise Tepler	Dem
55th	Seth Berry	Dem	Seth Berry	Dem
56th	Rick Mason	Rep	Rick Mason	Rep
57th	Stephen Wood	Rep	Thomas Martin	Rep
58th	James R. Handy	Dem	James R. Handy	Dem
59th	Roger Fuller	Dem	Margaret Craven	Dem
60th	Jared Golden	Dem	Kristen Cloutier	Dem
61st	Heidi Brooks	Dem	Heidi Brooks	Dem
62nd	Gina Melaragno	Dem	Gina Melaragno	Dem
63rd	Bruce Bickford	Rep	Bruce Bickford	Rep
64th	Bettyann Sheats	Dem	Bettyann Sheats	Dem
65th	Eleanor Espling	Rep	Amy Arata	Rep
66th	Jessica Fay	Dem	Jessica Fay	Dem
67th	Susan Austin	Rep	Susan Austin	Rep
68th	Richard Cebra	Rep	Richard Cebra	Rep
69th	Phyllis Ginzler	Rep	**Walter Riseman**	**Ind**
70th	Nathan Wadsworth	Rep	Nathan Wadsworth	Rep
71st	Tom Winsor	Rep	H. Sawin Millett	Rep
72nd	Kathleen Dillingham	Rep	Kathleen Dillingham	Rep
73rd	Lloyd Herrick	Rep	John Andrews	Rep
74th	Christina Riley	Dem	Christina Riley	Dem
75th	Jeff Timberlake	Rep	Joshua Morris	Rep
76th	Gary Hilliard	Rep	Dennis Keschl	Rep
77th	Michael D. Perkins	Rep	Michael D. Perkins	Rep
78th	Catherine Nadeau	Dem	Catherine Nadeau	Dem
79th	Timothy Theriault	Rep	Timothy Theriault	Rep
80th	Richard T. Bradstreet	Rep	Richard T. Bradstreet	Rep
81st	Craig Hickman	Dem	Craig Hickman	Dem
82nd	Kent Ackley	Ind	Kent Ackley	Ind
83rd	Gay Grant	Dem	Thomas Harnett	Dem
84th	Charlotte Warren	Dem	Charlotte Warren	Dem
85th	Donna Doore	Dem	Donna Doore	Dem
86th	Matthew Pouliot	Rep	Justin Fecteau	Rep
87th	Jeffery Hanley	Rep	Jeffery Hanley	Rep
88th	Deborah Sanderson	Rep	**Chloe Maxmin**	**Dem**
89th	Stephanie Hawke	Rep	**Holly Stover**	**Dem**
90th	Michael Devin	Dem	Michael Devin	Dem
91st	Abden Simmons	Rep	**Jeffrey Evangelos**	**Ind**
92nd	John Alden Spear	Dem	Ann Matlack	Dem
93rd	Anne Beebe-Center	Dem	Anne Beebe-Center	Dem
94th	Owen Casas	Ind	**Victoria Doudera**	**Dem**
95th	Paula G. Sutton	Rep	**William Pluecker**	**Ind**
96th	Stanley Zeigler	Dem	Stanley Zeigler	Dem
97th	Erin Herbig	Dem	Janice Dodge	Dem
98th	James S. Gillway	Rep	**Scott Cuddy**	**Dem**
99th	MaryAnne Kinney	Rep	MaryAnne Kinney	Rep
100th	Kenneth Fredette	Rep	Danny Costain	Rep
101st	David G. Haggan	Rep	David G. Haggan	Rep
102nd	Stacey Guerin	Rep	Abigail Griffin	Rep
103rd	Roger E. Reed	Rep	Roger E. Reed	Rep
104th	Raymond Wallace	Rep	Steven Foster	Rep
105th	Joel Stetkis	Rep	Joel Stetkis	Rep
106th	Scott Walter Strom	Rep	Scott Walter Strom	Rep
107th	Betty Austin	Dem	Betty Austin	Dem
108th	John Picchiotti	Rep	Shelley Rudnicki	Rep
109th	Thomas Longstaff	Dem	Bruce White	Dem
110th	Colleen Madigan	Dem	Colleen Madigan	Dem
111th	Brad Farrin	Rep	Philip Curtis	Rep
112th	Thomas Skolfield	Rep	Thomas Skolfield	Rep
113th	Lance Evans Harvell	Rep	**H. Scott Landry**	**Dem**
114th	Russell Black	Rep	Randall Hall	Rep
115th	John E. Madigan, Jr.	Dem	**Josanne Dolloff**	**Rep**
116th	Richard Pickett	Rep	Richard Pickett	Rep
117th	Frances Head	Rep	Frances Head	Rep
118th	Chad Wayne Grignon	Rep	Chad Wayne Grignon	Rep
119th	Paul Stearns	Rep	Paul Stearns	Rep
120th	Norman Higgins	Ind	Norman Higgins	Ind
121st	Robert Duchesne	Dem	**Gary Drinkwater**	**Rep**
122nd	Michelle Dunphy	Dem	Michelle Dunphy	Dem
123rd	Ryan Tipping	Dem	Ryan Tipping	Dem
124th	Aaron Frey	Dem	Aaron Frey	Dem
125th	Victoria Kornfield	Dem	Victoria Kornfield	Dem
126th	John Schneck	Dem	John Schneck	Dem
127th	Barbara A. Cardone	Dem	Barbara A. Cardone	Dem
128th	Garrel Robert Craig	Rep	**Arthur Verow**	**Dem**
129th	Peter Lyford	Rep	Peter Lyford	Rep
130th	Richard Campbell	Rep	Richard Campbell	Rep
131st	Karleton Ward	Rep	Sherman Hutchins	Rep
132nd	Louis Luchini	Dem	Nicole Grohoski	Dem
133rd	Ralph Chapman	Green	**Sarah Pebworth**	**Dem**
134th	Walter Kumiega	Dem	Genevieve McDonald	Dem
135th	Brian Hubbell	Dem	Brian Hubbell	Dem
136th	Richard Malaby	Rep	William Faulkingham	Rep
137th	Lawrence Lockman	Rep	Lawrence Lockman	Rep
138th	Robert Alley	Dem	Robert Alley	Dem
139th	William Tuell	Rep	William Tuell	Rep
140th	Anne C. Perry	Dem	Anne C. Perry	Dem
141st	Beth P. Turner	Rep	Kathy Javner	Rep
142nd	Sheldon Hanington	Rep	Sheldon Hanington	Rep
143rd	Stephen Stanley	Dem	Stephen Stanley	Dem
144th	Roger Sherman	Rep	Gregory Swallow	Rep
145th	Chris Johansen	Rep	Chris Johansen	Rep
146th	Dustin White	Rep	Dustin White	Rep
147th	Harold L. Stewart III	Rep	Harold L. Stewart III	Rep
148th	David Harold McCrea	Dem	David Harold McCrea	Dem
149th	Carol McElwee	Rep	John DeVeau	Rep
150th	Roland Martin	Dem	Roland Martin	Dem
151st	John L. Martin	Dem	John L. Martin	Dem
**Non-Voting Members**
Passamaquoddy Tribe	Matthew Dana II	Dem	Rena Newell	Dem
Houlton Band of Maliseet Indians	Henry John Bear	Green	N/A (Note: The Maliseet have chosen not to send a Representative to the Maine House for the 129th Legislature.)	

== Predictions ==
Source	Ranking	As of
Governing	Lean D	October 8, 2018

== Term-limited incumbents ==
21 incumbents (5 Democrats, 14 Republicans, one independent and one Green) were ineligible to run for a 5th consecutive term due to term limits.

- Wayne Parry (R), District 10
- Heather Sirocki (R), District 28
- Kimberly Monaghan (D), District 30
- Denise Harlow (I), District 36
- Stephen Wood (R), District 57
- Eleanor Espling (R), District 65
- Tom Winsor (R), District 71
- Jeff Timberlake (R), District 75
- Deborah Sanderson (R), District 88
- Erin Herbig (D), District 97
- James Gillway (R), District 98
- Kenneth Fredette (R), District 100
- Stacey Guerin (R), District 102
- Raymond Wallace (R), District 104
- Thomas Longstaff (D), District 109
- Russell Black (R), District 114
- Louis Luchini (D), District 132
- Ralph Chapman (G), District 133
- Walter Kumiega (D), District 134
- Richard Malaby (R), District 136
- Beth Turner (R), District 141

== Detailed results by State House district ==
=== District 1 ===
Maine House of Representatives district 1 general election, 2018
Party	Candidate	Votes	%
Democratic	Deane Rykerson (incumbent)	2,914	70.13%
Green	Andrew Howard	1,241	29.87%
Total votes		4,155	100.0
Democratic hold			

=== District 2 ===
Maine House of Representatives district 2 general election, 2018
Party	Candidate	Votes	%
Democratic	Michele Meyer	3,045	62.16%
Republican	Dan Ammons	1,854	37.86%
Total votes		4,899	100.0
Democratic hold			

=== District 3 ===
Maine House of Representatives district 3 general election, 2018
Party	Candidate	Votes	%
Democratic	Lydia Blume (incumbent)	3,272	60.22%
Republican	Allyson Cavaretta	2,161	39.78%
Total votes		5,433	100.0
Democratic hold			

=== District 4 ===
Maine House of Representatives district 4 general election, 2018
Party	Candidate	Votes	%
Democratic	Patricia Hymanson (incumbent)	2,902	58.51%
Republican	Bradley Moulton	2,058	41.49%
Total votes		4,960	100.0
Democratic hold			

=== District 5 ===
Maine House of Representatives district 5 general election, 2018
Party	Candidate	Votes	%
Republican	Beth O'Connor (incumbent)	1,941	51.36%
Democratic	Charles Galemmo	1,356	35.88%
Independent	Noah Cobb	482	12.75%
Total votes		3,772	100.0
Republican hold			

=== District 6 ===
Maine House of Representatives district 6 general election, 2018
Party	Candidate	Votes	%
Democratic	Tiffany Roberts-Lovell	2,400	58.10%
Republican	Manley Gove	1,731	41.90%
Total votes		4,131	100.0
Democratic hold			

=== District 7 ===
Maine House of Representatives district 7 general election, 2018
Party	Candidate	Votes	%
Democratic	Daniel Hobbs	2,820	52.65%
Republican	John Howarth	2,536	47.45%
Total votes		5,356	100.0
Democratic gain from Republican			

=== District 8 ===
Maine House of Representatives district 8 general election, 2018
Party	Candidate	Votes	%
Democratic	Christopher Babbidge (incumbent)	3,501	65.07%
Republican	Bradley Ducharme	1,879	34.93%
Total votes		5,351	100.0
Democratic hold			

=== District 9 ===
Maine House of Representatives district 9 general election, 2018
Party	Candidate	Votes	%
Democratic	Diane Denk	2,857	59.02%
Republican	Roger Seavey	1,984	40.98%
Total votes		4,841	100.0
Democratic gain from Republican			

=== District 10 ===
Maine House of Representatives district 10 general election, 2018
Party	Candidate	Votes	%
Democratic	Henry Ingwersen	2,374	51.74%
Republican	James Booth	2,214	48.26%
Total votes		4,588	100.0
Democratic gain from Republican			

=== District 11 ===
Maine House of Representatives district 11 general election, 2018
Party	Candidate	Votes	%
Democratic	Ryan Fecteau (incumbent)	2,395	62.03%
Republican	Emily Rousseau	1,466	37.97%
Total votes		3,861	100.0
Democratic hold			

=== District 12 ===
Maine House of Representatives district 12 general election, 2018
Party	Candidate	Votes	%
Democratic	Victoria Foley	2,389	100.0
Total votes		2,389	100.0
Democratic gain from Independent			

=== District 13 ===
Maine House of Representatives district 13 general election, 2018
Party	Candidate	Votes	%
Democratic	Lori Gramlich	2,775	59.50%
Republican	Sharri MacDonald	1,889	40.50%
Total votes		4,664	100.0
Democratic hold			

=== District 14 ===
Maine House of Representatives district 14 general election, 2018
Party	Candidate	Votes	%
Democratic	Donna Bailey (incumbent)	2,609	57.10%
Republican	Stephen DuPuis	1,282	28.06%
Independent	Frederick Samp	678	14.84%
Total votes		4,569	100.0
Democratic hold			

=== District 15 ===
Maine House of Representatives district 15 general election, 2018
Party	Candidate	Votes	%
Democratic	Margaret O'Neil (incumbent)	2,747	62.87%
Republican	Joseph Lynch	1,622	37.13%
Total votes		4,369	100.0
Democratic hold			

=== District 16 ===
Maine House of Representatives district 16 general election, 2018
Party	Candidate	Votes	%
Republican	Donald Marean (incumbent)	2,710	56.17%
Democratic	David Durrell	2,115	43.83%
Total votes		4,825	100.0
Republican hold			

=== District 17 ===
Maine House of Representatives district 17 general election, 2018
Party	Candidate	Votes	%
Republican	Dwayne W. Prescott (incumbent)	3,022	100.0
Total votes		3,022	100.0
Republican hold			

=== District 18 ===
Maine House of Representatives district 18 general election, 2018
Party	Candidate	Votes	%
Democratic	Anne-Marie Mastraccio (incumbent)	1,583	58.28%
Republican	Pamela Buck	1,133	41.72%
Total votes		2,716	100.0
Democratic hold			

=== District 19 ===
Maine House of Representatives district 19 general election, 2018
Party	Candidate	Votes	%
Republican	Matthew Harrington (incumbent)	1,879	55.99%
Democratic	Jeremy Mele	1,477	44.01%
Total votes		3,356	100.0
Republican hold			

=== District 20 ===
Maine House of Representatives district 20 general election, 2018
Party	Candidate	Votes	%
Republican	Theodore Kryzak	2,215	57.41%
Democratic	Daniel Lauzon	1,643	42.59%
Total votes		3,858	100.0
Republican hold			

=== District 21 ===
Maine House of Representatives district 21 general election, 2018
Party	Candidate	Votes	%
Republican	Heidi Sampson (incumbent)	2,296	52.60%
Democratic	Kelcy McNamara	1,700	38.95%
Green	Justin Reinhardt	369	8.45%
Total votes		4,365	100.0
Republican hold			

=== District 22 ===
Maine House of Representatives district 22 general election, 2018
Party	Candidate	Votes	%
Republican	Mark Blier	2,259	53.42%
Democratic	Richard Fitzgerald	1,970	46.58%
Total votes		4,229	100.0
Republican hold			

=== District 23 ===
Maine House of Representatives district 23 general election, 2018
Party	Candidate	Votes	%
Republican	Lester Ordway (incumbent)	2,298	54.52%
Democratic	Timothy Goodwin	1,917	45.48%
Total votes		4,215	100.0
Republican hold			

=== District 24 ===
Maine House of Representatives district 24 general election, 2018
Party	Candidate	Votes	%
Democratic	Mark Bryant (incumbent)	2,337	54.39%
Republican	Thomas Tyler	1,960	45.61%
Total votes		4,297	100.0
Democratic hold			

=== District 25 ===
Maine House of Representatives district 25 general election, 2018
Party	Candidate	Votes	%
Republican	Patrick Corey (incumbent)	2,222	56.15%
Democratic	Jennie Butler	1,735	43.85%
Total votes		3,957	100.0
Republican hold			

=== District 26 ===
Maine House of Representatives district 26 general election, 2018
Party	Candidate	Votes	%
Democratic	Maureen Terry (incumbent)	3,306	100.0
Total votes		3,306	100.0
Democratic hold			

=== District 27 ===
Maine House of Representatives district 27 general election, 2018
Party	Candidate	Votes	%
Democratic	Andrew McLean (incumbent)	3,056	59.59%
Republican	Roger Densmore	2,072	40.41%
Total votes		5,128	100.0
Democratic hold			

=== District 28 ===
Maine House of Representatives district 28 general election, 2018
Party	Candidate	Votes	%
Democratic	Christopher Caiazzo	2,792	53.11%
Republican	Linwood Higgins	2,476	46.89%
Total votes		5,268	100.0
Democratic gain from Republican			

=== District 29 ===
Maine House of Representatives district 29 general election, 2018
Party	Candidate	Votes	%
Democratic	Shawn Babine	3,001	53.56%
Republican	Karen Vachon (incumbent)	2,602	46.44%
Total votes		5,603	100.0
Democratic gain from Republican			

=== District 30 ===
Maine House of Representatives district 30 general election, 2018
Party	Candidate	Votes	%
Democratic	Anne Carney	4,028	75.15%
Republican	Charles Rich	1,332	24.85%
Total votes		5,360	100.0
Democratic hold			

=== District 31 ===
Maine House of Representatives district 31 general election, 2018
Party	Candidate	Votes	%
Democratic	Lois Galgay Reckitt (incumbent)	4,017	79.07%
Republican	Kenneth Decatur	1,063	20.93%
Total votes		5,080	100.0
Democratic hold			

=== District 32 ===
Maine House of Representatives district 32 general election, 2018
Party	Candidate	Votes	%
Democratic	Christopher Kessler	3,192	72.55%
Republican	Tammy Walter	1,308	27.45%
Total votes		4,400	100.0
Democratic hold			

=== District 33 ===
Maine House of Representatives district 33 general election, 2018
Party	Candidate	Votes	%
Democratic	Victoria Morales	2,638	74.44%
Republican	Christopher Hoy	906	25.56%
Total votes		3,544	100.0
Democratic gain from Independent			

=== District 34 ===
Maine House of Representatives district 34 general election, 2018
Party	Candidate	Votes	%
Democratic	Andrew Gattine (incumbent)	3,322	100.0
Total votes		3,322	100.0
Democratic hold			

=== District 35 ===
Maine House of Representatives district 35 general election, 2018
Party	Candidate	Votes	%
Democratic	Ann Peoples	2,682	62.39%
Republican	James Bourque	1,617	37.61%
Total votes		4,299	100.0
Democratic hold			

=== District 36 ===
Maine House of Representatives district 36 general election, 2018
Party	Candidate	Votes	%
Democratic	Michael F. Brennan	2,617	77.61%
Republican	Samuel Ledue	755	22.39%
Total votes		3,372	100.0
Democratic gain from Independent			

=== District 37 ===
Maine House of Representatives district 37 general election, 2018
Party	Candidate	Votes	%
Democratic	Richard Farnsworth (incumbent)	2,974	88.38%
Independent	Justin Pollard	381	11.62%
Total votes		3,365	100.0
Democratic hold			

=== District 38 ===
Maine House of Representatives district 38 general election, 2018
Party	Candidate	Votes	%
Democratic	Matthew Moonen (incumbent)	4,235	100.0
Total votes		4,235	100.0
Democratic hold			

=== District 39 ===
Maine House of Representatives district 39 general election, 2018
Party	Candidate	Votes	%
Democratic	Michael Sylvester (incumbent)	4,270	86.63%
Republican	Peter Doyle	659	13.37%
Total votes		4,929	100.0
Democratic hold			

=== District 40 ===
Maine House of Representatives district 40 general election, 2018
Party	Candidate	Votes	%
Democratic	Rachel Talbot Ross (incumbent)	3,134	100.0
Total votes		3,134	100.0
Democratic hold			

=== District 41 ===
Maine House of Representatives district 41 general election, 2018
Party	Candidate	Votes	%
Democratic	Erik Jorgensen (incumbent)	4,021	100.0
Total votes		4,021	100.0
Democratic hold			

=== District 42 ===
Maine House of Representatives district 42 general election, 2018
Party	Candidate	Votes	%
Democratic	Benjamin Collings (incumbent)	3,293	77.72%
Republican	Susan Abercrombie	944	22.28%
Total votes		4,237	100.0
Democratic hold			

=== District 43 ===
Maine House of Representatives district 43 general election, 2018
Party	Candidate	Votes	%
Democratic	W. Edward Crockett	4,161	100.0
Total votes		4,161	100.0
Democratic hold			

=== District 44 ===
Maine House of Representatives district 44 general election, 2018
Party	Candidate	Votes	%
Democratic	Teresa Pierce (incumbent)	3,474	59.36%
Republican	Sarah Sandlin	2,090	35.71%
Green	Kathryn Schrock	288	4.92%
Total votes		5,852	100.0
Democratic hold			

=== District 45 ===
Maine House of Representatives district 45 general election, 2018
Party	Candidate	Votes	%
Democratic	Dale Denno (incumbent)	3,731	65.02%
Republican	Tamsin Thomas	2,007	34.98%
Total votes		5,738	100.0
Democratic hold			

=== District 46 ===
Maine House of Representatives district 46 general election, 2018
Party	Candidate	Votes	%
Democratic	Braden Sharpe	2,652	50.76%
Republican	Paul Chace (incumbent)	2,573	49.24%
Total votes		5,225	100.0
Democratic gain from Republican			

=== District 47 ===
Maine House of Representatives district 47 general election, 2018
Party	Candidate	Votes	%
Democratic	Janice Cooper (incumbent)	2,987	53.13%
Independent	Dennis Welsh	2,635	46.87%
Total votes		5,622	100.0
Democratic hold			

=== District 48 ===
Maine House of Representatives district 48 general election, 2018
Party	Candidate	Votes	%
Democratic	Sara Gideon (incumbent)	4,003	73.54%
Republican	Paul Schulz	1,440	26.46%
Total votes		5,443	100.0
Democratic hold			

=== District 49 ===
Maine House of Representatives district 49 general election, 2018
Party	Candidate	Votes	%
Democratic	Mattie Daughtry (incumbent)	3,848	70.76%
Republican	Michael Stevens	1,590	29.24%
Total votes		5,438	100.0
Democratic hold			

=== District 50 ===
Maine House of Representatives district 50 general election, 2018
Party	Candidate	Votes	%
Democratic	Ralph Tucker (incumbent)	3,612	75.56%
Republican	Michael Lawler	1,168	24.44%
Total votes		4,780	100.0
Democratic hold			

=== District 51 ===
Maine House of Representatives district 51 general election, 2018
Party	Candidate	Votes	%
Democratic	Joyce McCreight (incumbent)	3,115	60.80%
Republican	Sean Hall	2,008	39.20%
Total votes		5,123	100.0
Democratic hold			

=== District 52 ===
Maine House of Representatives district 52 general election, 2018
Party	Candidate	Votes	%
Democratic	Jennifer DeChant (incumbent)	2,959	71.61%
Republican	Bil Weidner	1,173	28.39%
Total votes		4,132	100.0
Democratic hold			

=== District 53 ===
Maine House of Representatives district 53 general election, 2018
Party	Candidate	Votes	%
Democratic	Allison Hepler	2,583	51.16%
Republican	Jeffrey Pierce (incumbent)	2,466	48.84%
Total votes		5,049	100.0
Democratic gain from Republican			

=== District 54 ===
Maine House of Representatives district 54 general election, 2018
Party	Candidate	Votes	%
Democratic	Denise Tepler (incumbent)	3,273	63.66%
Republican	Leon Brillant	1,868	36.34%
Total votes		5,141	100.0
Democratic hold			

=== District 55 ===
Maine House of Representatives district 55 general election, 2018
Party	Candidate	Votes	%
Democratic	Seth Berry (incumbent)	2,667	56.35%
Republican	Guy Lebida	2,066	43.65%
Total votes		4,733	100.0
Democratic hold			

=== District 56 ===
Maine House of Representatives district 56 general election, 2018
Party	Candidate	Votes	%
Republican	Richard Mason (incumbent)	2,390	60.57%
Democratic	Martha Poliquin	1,556	39.43%
Total votes		3,946	100.0
Republican hold			

=== District 57 ===
Maine House of Representatives district 57 general election, 2018
Party	Candidate	Votes	%
Republican	Thomas Martin	2,526	62.85%
Democratic	Eryn Gilchrist	1,493	37.15%
Total votes			100.0
Republican hold			

=== District 58 ===
Maine House of Representatives district 58 general election, 2018
Party	Candidate	Votes	%
Democratic	James R. Handy (incumbent)	2,019	50.51%
Republican	Denise Hurilla	1,978	49.49%
Total votes		3,997	100.0
Democratic hold			

=== District 59 ===
Maine House of Representatives district 59 general election, 2018
Party	Candidate	Votes	%
Democratic	Margaret Craven	2,503	58.18%
Republican	John Reeder	1,799	41.82%
Total votes		4,302	100.0
Democratic hold			

=== District 60 ===
Maine House of Representatives district 60 general election, 2018
Party	Candidate	Votes	%
Democratic	Kristen Cloutier	2,040	75.86%
Republican	Leslie Dubois	649	24.14%
Total votes		2,689	100.0
Democratic hold			

=== District 61 ===
Maine House of Representatives district 61 general election, 2018
Party	Candidate	Votes	%
Democratic	Heidi Brooks (incumbent)	1,350	52.41%
Republican	Michael Lachance	1,004	38.98%
Independent	Luke Jensen	150	5.82%
Green	Kimberly Pfusch	72	2.8%
Total votes		2,576	100.0
Democratic hold			

=== District 62 ===
Maine House of Representatives district 62 general election, 2018
Party	Candidate	Votes	%
Democratic	Gina Melaragno (incumbent)	1,943	100.0
Total votes		1,943	100.0
Democratic hold			

=== District 63 ===
Maine House of Representatives district 63 general election, 2018
Party	Candidate	Votes	%
Republican	Bruce Bickford (incumbent)	2,403	59.26%
Democratic	Brian Carrier	1,652	40.74%
Total votes		4,055	100.0
Republican hold			

=== District 64 ===
Maine House of Representatives district 64 general election, 2018
Party	Candidate	Votes	%
Democratic	Bettyann Sheats (incumbent)	2,497	56.89%
Republican	Michael Travers	1,892	43.11%
Total votes		4,389	100.0
Democratic hold			

=== District 65 ===
Maine House of Representatives district 65 general election, 2018
Party	Candidate	Votes	%
Republican	Amy Arata	2,368	54.26%
Democratic	Misty Coolidge	1,996	45.74%
Total votes		4,364	100.0
Republican hold			

=== District 66 ===
Maine House of Representatives district 66 general election, 2018
Party	Candidate	Votes	%
Democratic	Jessica Fay (incumbent)	2,507	56.75%
Republican	Gregory Foster	1,987	43.25%
Total votes		4,594	100.0
Democratic hold			

=== District 67 ===
Maine House of Representatives district 67 general election, 2018
Party	Candidate	Votes	%
Republican	Susan Austin (incumbent)	2,417	53.11%
Independent	Anne Gass (Note: Listed on ballot as "Common Sense Independent.")	2,134	46.89%
Total votes		4,551	100.0
Republican hold			

=== District 68 ===
Maine House of Representatives district 68 general election, 2018
Party	Candidate	Votes	%
Republican	Richard Cebra (incumbent)	2,410	52.70%
Democratic	Janice Barter	2,163	47.30%
Total votes		4,573	100.0
Republican hold			

=== District 69 ===
Maine House of Representatives district 69 general election, 2018
Party	Candidate	Votes	%
Independent	Walter Riseman	2,420	55.01%
Republican	Tony Lorrain	1,979	44.99%
Total votes			100.0
Independent gain from Republican			

=== District 70 ===
Maine House of Representatives district 70 general election, 2018
Party	Candidate	Votes	%
Republican	Nathan Wadsworth (incumbent)	2,213	53.91%
Democratic	Warren Richardson	1,892	46.09%
Total votes		4,105	100.0
Republican hold			

=== District 71 ===
Maine House of Representatives district 71 general election, 2018
Party	Candidate	Votes	%
Republican	H. Sawin Millett	2,159	52.48%
Democratic	Doretta Colburn	1,755	47.52%
Total votes		3,914	100.0
Republican hold			

=== District 72 ===
Maine House of Representatives district 72 general election, 2018
Party	Candidate	Votes	%
Republican	Kathleen Dillingham (incumbent)	2,241	58.1
Democratic	Raymond Cote	953	24.7
Independent	Dennis O'Connor	665	17.2
Total votes		3,859	100.0
Republican hold			

=== District 73 ===
Maine House of Representatives district 73 general election, 2018
Party	Candidate	Votes	%
Republican	John Andrews	2,054	58.35%
Democratic	Robert Faunce	1,466	41.65%
Total votes		3,520	100.0
Republican hold			

=== District 74 ===
Maine House of Representatives district 74 general election, 2018
Party	Candidate	Votes	%
Democratic	Christina Riley (incumbent)	2,251	52.87%
Republican	Robert Staples	1,498	47.13%
Total votes		3,749	100.0
Democratic hold			

=== District 75 ===
Maine House of Representatives district 75 general election, 2018
Party	Candidate	Votes	%
Republican	Joshua Morris	2,212	52.87%
Democratic	John Nutting	1,972	47.13%
Total votes		4,184	100.0
Republican hold			

=== District 76 ===
Maine House of Representatives district 76 general election, 2018
Party	Candidate	Votes	%
Republican	Dennis Keschl	2,562	51.88%
Democratic	Carol Carothers	2,324	48.12%
Total votes		4,830	100.0
Republican hold			

=== District 77 ===
Maine House of Representatives district 77 general election, 2018
Party	Candidate	Votes	%
Republican	Michael D. Perkins (incumbent)	3,601	100.0
Total votes		3,601	100.0
Republican hold			

=== District 78 ===
Maine House of Representatives district 78 general election, 2018
Party	Candidate	Votes	%
Democratic	Catherine Nadeau (incumbent)	2,153	55.63%
Republican	Benjamin Twitchell	1,717	44.37%
Total votes		3,870	100.0
Democratic hold			

=== District 79 ===
Maine House of Representatives district 79 general election, 2018
Party	Candidate	Votes	%
Republican	Timothy Theriault (incumbent)	2,366	60.90%
Democratic	Dawn Castner	1,140	29.34%
Independent	Lindsey Harwath	379	9.76%
Total votes		3,877	100.0
Republican hold			

=== District 80 ===
Maine House of Representatives district 80 general election, 2018
Party	Candidate	Votes	%
Republican	Richard Bradstreet (incumbent)	2,312	56.57%
Democratic	Stephen Ball	1,775	43.43%
Total votes		4,087	100.0
Republican hold			

=== District 81 ===
Maine House of Representatives district 81 general election, 2018
Party	Candidate	Votes	%
Democratic	Craig Hickman (incumbent)	3,120	100.0
Total votes		3,120	100.0
Democratic hold			

=== District 82 ===
Maine House of Representatives district 82 general election, 2018
Party	Candidate	Votes	%
Independent	Kent Ackley (Note: Listed on ballot as "Candid Common Sense.") (incumbent)	2,155	50.19%
Republican	Randall Greenwood	2,139	49.81%
Total votes		4,294	100.0
Independent hold			

=== District 83 ===
Maine House of Representatives district 83 general election, 2018
Party	Candidate	Votes	%
Democratic	Thomas Harnett	2,164	54.36%
Republican	Denis Coutts	1,817	45.64%
Total votes		3,981	100.0
Democratic hold			

=== District 84 ===
Maine House of Representatives district 84 general election, 2018
Party	Candidate	Votes	%
Democratic	Charlotte Warren (incumbent)	2,421	51.07%
Republican	Earle McCormick	2,320	48.93%
Total votes		4,741	100.0
Democratic hold			

=== District 85 ===
Maine House of Representatives district 85 general election, 2018
Party	Candidate	Votes	%
Democratic	Donna Doore (incumbent)	2,274	62.54%
Republican	James Glusker	1,362	37.46%
Total votes		3,636	100.0
Democratic hold			

=== District 86 ===
Maine House of Representatives district 86 general election, 2018
Party	Candidate	Votes	%
Republican	Justin Fecteau	1,682	51.06%
Democratic	Jennifer Day	1,612	48.94%
Total votes		3,294	100.0
Republican hold			

=== District 87 ===
Maine House of Representatives district 87 general election, 2018
Party	Candidate	Votes	%
Republican	Jeffery Hanley (incumbent)	2,416	53.39%
Democratic	Jason Putnam	2,109	46.61%
Total votes		4,525	100.0
Republican hold			

=== District 88 ===
Maine House of Representatives district 88 general election, 2018
Party	Candidate	Votes	%
Democratic	Chloe Maxmin	2,272	52.52%
Republican	Michael Lemelin	2,054	47.48%
Total votes		4,326	100.0
Democratic gain from Republican			

=== District 89 ===
Maine House of Representatives district 89 general election, 2018
Party	Candidate	Votes	%
Democratic	Holly Stover	2,624	51.57%
Republican	Stephanie Hawke (incumbent)	2,464	48.43%
Total votes		5,088	100.0
Democratic gain from Republican			

=== District 90 ===
Maine House of Representatives district 90 general election, 2018
Party	Candidate	Votes	%
Democratic	Michael Devin (incumbent)	3,363	65.35%
Republican	Richard Van Knowe	1,783	34.65%
Total votes		5,146	100.0
Democratic hold			

=== District 91 ===
Maine House of Representatives district 91 general election, 2018
Party	Candidate	Votes	%
Independent	Jeffrey Evangelos	2,168	51.58%
Republican	Abden Simmons (incumbent)	2,035	48.42%
Total votes		4,203	100.0
Independent gain from Republican			

=== District 92 ===
Maine House of Representatives district 92 general election, 2018
Party	Candidate	Votes	%
Democratic	Ann Matlack	2,346	54.86%
Republican	Justin Thompson	1,930	45.14%
Total votes		4,276	100.0
Democratic hold			

=== District 93 ===
Maine House of Representatives district 93 general election, 2018
Party	Candidate	Votes	%
Democratic	Anne Beebe-Center (incumbent)	2,408	61.97%
Republican	Maynard Stanley	1,478	38.03%
Total votes		3,886	100.0
Democratic hold			

=== District 94 ===
Maine House of Representatives district 94 general election, 2018
Party	Candidate	Votes	%
Democratic	Victoria Doudera	2,970	52.43%
Independent	Owen Casas (incumbent)	2,695	47.57%
Total votes		5,665	100.0
Democratic gain from Independent			

=== District 95 ===
Maine House of Representatives district 95 general election, 2018
Party	Candidate	Votes	%
Independent	William Pluecker (Note: Listed on ballot as "Independent for Maine.")	2,259	54.41%
Republican	Paula Sutton (incumbent)	1,893	45.59%
Total votes		4,152	100.0
Independent gain from Republican			

=== District 96 ===
Maine House of Representatives district 96 general election, 2018
Party	Candidate	Votes	%
Democratic	Stanley Zeigler (incumbent)	2,644	55.31%
Republican	Robert Currier	2,136	44.69%
Total votes		4,780	100.0
Democratic hold			

=== District 97 ===
Maine House of Representatives district 97 general election, 2018
Party	Candidate	Votes	%
Democratic	Janice Dodge	3,440	72.70%
Republican	Bevelyn Beatty	1,292	27.30%
Total votes		4,732	100.0
Democratic hold			

=== District 98 ===
Maine House of Representatives district 98 general election, 2018
Party	Candidate	Votes	%
Democratic	Scott Cuddy	2,338	54.82%
Republican	Brian Kresge	1,927	45.18%
Total votes		4,265	100.0
Democratic gain from Republican			

=== District 99 ===
Maine House of Representatives district 99 general election, 2018
Party	Candidate	Votes	%
Republican	MaryAnne Kinney (incumbent)	2,125	51.88%
Democratic	April Turner	1,971	48.12%
Total votes		4,096	100.0
Republican hold			

=== District 100 ===
Maine House of Representatives district 100 general election, 2018
Party	Candidate	Votes	%
Republican	Danny Costain	2,456	67.49%
Democratic	Frederick Austin	1,183	32.51%
Total votes		3,639	100.0
Republican hold			

=== District 101 ===
Maine House of Representatives district 101 general election, 2018
Party	Candidate	Votes	%
Republican	David Haggan (incumbent)	2,514	58.14%
Democratic	James Davitt	1,542	35.66%
Green	Robin Downs	268	6.19%
Total votes		4,324	100.0
Republican hold			

=== District 102 ===
Maine House of Representatives district 102 general election, 2018
Party	Candidate	Votes	%
Republican	Abigail Griffin	2,432	65.84%
Democratic	Kimberly Hammill	1,262	34.16%
Total votes		3,694	100.0
Republican hold			

=== District 103 ===
Maine House of Representatives district 103 general election, 2018
Party	Candidate	Votes	%
Republican	Roger Reed (incumbent)	2,955	100.0
Total votes		2,955	100.0
Republican hold			

=== District 104 ===
Maine House of Representatives district 104 general election, 2018
Party	Candidate	Votes	%
Republican	Steven Foster	2,881	100.0
Total votes		2,881	100.0
Republican hold			

=== District 105 ===
Maine House of Representatives district 105 general election, 2018
Party	Candidate	Votes	%
Republican	Joel Stetkis	2,398	65.75%
Democratic	John Clark	1,249	34.25%
Total votes		3,647	100.0
Republican hold			

=== District 106 ===
Maine House of Representatives district 106 general election, 2018
Party	Candidate	Votes	%
Republican	Scott Strom (incumbent)	1,672	52.04%
Democratic	Stanley Short	1,541	47.96%
Total votes		3,213	100.0
Republican hold			

=== District 107 ===
Maine House of Representatives district 107 general election, 2018
Party	Candidate	Votes	%
Democratic	Betty Austin (incumbent)	1,752	54.31%
Republican	Anne Amadon	1,474	45.69%
Total votes		3,226	100.0
Democratic hold			

=== District 108 ===
Maine House of Representatives district 108 general election, 2018
Party	Candidate	Votes	%
Republican	Shelley Rudnicki	1,988	58.20%
Democratic	Aaron Rowden	1,428	41.80%
Total votes		3,416	100.0
Republican hold			

=== District 109 ===
Maine House of Representatives district 109 general election, 2018
Party	Candidate	Votes	%
Democratic	Bruce White	2,369	67.78%
Republican	Karen Rancourt-Thomas	1,126	32.22%
Total votes		3,495	100.0
Democratic hold			

=== District 110 ===
Maine House of Representatives district 110 general election, 2018
Party	Candidate	Votes	%
Democratic	Colleen Madigan (incumbent)	1,992	61.22%
Republican	Mark Andre	1,262	38.78%
Total votes		3,254	100.0
Democratic hold			

=== District 111 ===
Maine House of Representatives district 111 general election, 2018
Party	Candidate	Votes	%
Republican	Philip Curtis	2,114	57.24%
Democratic	Katherine Wilder	1,579	42.76%
Total votes		3,693	100.0
Republican hold			

=== District 112 ===
Maine House of Representatives district 112 general election, 2018
Party	Candidate	Votes	%
Republican	Thomas Skolfield (incumbent)	2,607	65.58%
Democratic	Cynthia Soma-Hernandez	1,386	44.42%
Total votes		3,975	100.0
Republican hold			

=== District 113 ===
Maine House of Representatives district 113 general election, 2018
Party	Candidate	Votes	%
Democratic	H. Scott Landry	2,381	58.46%
Republican	Paul Brown	1,692	41.54%
Total votes		4,073	100.0
Democratic gain from Republican			

=== District 114 ===
Maine House of Representatives district 114 general election, 2018
Party	Candidate	Votes	%
Republican	Randall Hall	2,184	54.21%
Democratic	Cherieann Harrison	1,437	35.67%
Independent	Maitland Lord (Note: Listed on ballot as "People's Unenrolled Independent.")	408	10.13%
Total votes		4,029	100.0
Republican hold			

=== District 115 ===
Maine House of Representatives district 115 general election, 2018
Party	Candidate	Votes	%
Republican	Josanne Dolloff	1,883	54.31%
Democratic	John Madigan (incumbent)	1,649	46.69%
Total votes		3,532	100.0
Republican gain from Democratic			

=== District 116 ===
Maine House of Representatives district 116 general election, 2018
Party	Candidate	Votes	%
Republican	Richard Pickett (incumbent)	2,367	73.85%
Democratic	Benjamin McCollister	1,340	36.15%
Total votes		3,707	100.0
Republican hold			

=== District 117 ===
Maine House of Representatives district 117 general election, 2018
Party	Candidate	Votes	%
Republican	Frances Head (incumbent)	2,497	50.82%
Democratic	Stephanie LeBlanc	2,416	49.18%
Total votes		4,913	100.0
Republican hold			

=== District 118 ===
Maine House of Representatives district 118 general election, 2018
Party	Candidate	Votes	%
Republican	Chad Grignon (incumbent)	2,219	64.19%
Democratic	John Thiele	1,238	35.81%
Total votes		3,457	100.0
Republican hold			

=== District 119 ===
Maine House of Representatives district 119 general election, 2018
Party	Candidate	Votes	%
Republican	Paul Stearns (incumbent)	2,324	58.84%
Independent	Tyler Adkins	1,499	37.95%
Green	Jaco Deertrack	127	3.21%
Total votes		3,950	100.0
Republican hold			

=== District 120 ===
Maine House of Representatives district 120 general election, 2018
Party	Candidate	Votes	%
Independent	Norman Higgins (incumbent)	1,853	54.55%
Democratic	Richard Evans	1,544	45.45%
Total votes		3,397	100.0
Independent hold			

=== District 121 ===
Maine House of Representatives district 121 general election, 2018
Party	Candidate	Votes	%
Republican	Gary Drinkwater	2,143	61.14%
Democratic	Terri Casavant	1,208	34.47%
Independent	Bonnie Young (Note: Listed on ballot as "Unenrolled.")	154	4.39%
Total votes		3,505	100.0
Republican gain from Democratic			

=== District 122 ===
Maine House of Representatives district 122 general election, 2018
Party	Candidate	Votes	%
Democratic	Michelle Dunphy (incumbent)	2,238	69.78%
Republican	Delaina Toothman	969	30.22%
Total votes		3,207	100.0
Democratic hold			

=== District 123 ===
Maine House of Representatives district 123 general election, 2018
Party	Candidate	Votes	%
Democratic	Ryan Tipping (incumbent)	2,736	76.38%
Republican	Derek Jones	846	23.62%
Total votes		3,582	100.0
Democratic hold			

=== District 124 ===
Maine House of Representatives district 124 general election, 2018
Party	Candidate	Votes	%
Democratic	Aaron Frey (incumbent)	2,346	63.30%
Republican	Daniel LaPointe	1,360	36.70%
Total votes		3,706	100.0
Democratic hold			

=== District 125 ===
Maine House of Representatives district 125 general election, 2018
Party	Candidate	Votes	%
Democratic	Victoria Kornfield (incumbent)	1,978	58.89%
Republican	Gary Capehart	1,186	35.31%
Libertarian	Cody Blackburn	195	5.81%
Total votes		3,359	100.0
Democratic hold			

=== District 126 ===
Maine House of Representatives district 126 general election, 2018
Party	Candidate	Votes	%
Democratic	John Schneck (incumbent)	1,443	56.54%
Republican	Joshua Hiatt	1,100	43.46%
Total votes		2,543	100.0
Democratic hold			

=== District 127 ===
Maine House of Representatives district 127 general election, 2018
Party	Candidate	Votes	%
Democratic	Barbara Cardone (incumbent)	2,028	54.09%
Independent	Carrie Mae Smith	1,142	45.91%
Total votes		3,170	100.0
Democratic hold			

=== District 128 ===
Maine House of Representatives district 128 general election, 2018
Party	Candidate	Votes	%
Democratic	Arthur Verow	1,957	52.20%
Republican	Garrel Craig (incumbent)	1,792	47.80%
Total votes		3,749	100.0
Democratic gain from Republican			

=== District 129 ===
Maine House of Representatives district 129 general election, 2018
Party	Candidate	Votes	%
Republican	Peter Lyford (incumbent)	2,734	100.0
Total votes		2,734	100.0
Republican hold			

=== District 130 ===
Maine House of Representatives district 130 general election, 2018
Party	Candidate	Votes	%
Republican	Richard Campbell (incumbent)	2,506	59.91%
Democratic	Michael Reynolds	1,677	40.09%
Total votes		4,183	100.0
Republican hold			

=== District 131 ===
Maine House of Representatives district 131 general election, 2018
Party	Candidate	Votes	%
Republican	Sherman Hutchins	2,474	53.18%
Democratic	Nathalie Arruda	2,178	46.82%
Total votes		4,652	100.0
Republican hold			

=== District 132 ===
Maine House of Representatives district 132 general election, 2018
Party	Candidate	Votes	%
Democratic	Nicole Grohoski	2,396	54.33%
Republican	Mark Remick	2,014	45.67%
Total votes		4,410	100.0
Democratic hold			

=== District 133 ===
Maine House of Representatives district 133 general election, 2018
Party	Candidate	Votes	%
Democratic	Sarah Pebworth	3,039	63.34%
Republican	Nancy Colwell	1,759	36.66%
Total votes		4,798	100.0
Democratic gain from Green			

=== District 134 ===
Maine House of Representatives district 134 general election, 2018
Party	Candidate	Votes	%
Democratic	Genevieve McDonald	3,111	70.53%
Republican	Philip Brady	1,300	29.47%
Total votes		4,411	100.0
Democratic hold			

=== District 135 ===
Maine House of Representatives district 135 general election, 2018
Party	Candidate	Votes	%
Democratic	Brian Hubbell (incumbent)	3,913	75.06%
Republican	Maurice Marshall	1,300	24.94%
Total votes		5,213	100.0
Democratic hold			

=== District 136 ===
Maine House of Representatives district 136 general election, 2018
Party	Candidate	Votes	%
Republican	William Faulkingham	2,308	57.53%
Democratic	Kylie Bragdon	1,704	42.47%
Total votes		4,012	100.0
Republican hold			

=== District 137 ===
Maine House of Representatives district 137 general election, 2018
Party	Candidate	Votes	%
Republican	Lawrence Lockman (incumbent)	2,084	59.17%
Democratic	Douglas Bunker	1,468	40.83%
Total votes		3,552	100.0
Republican hold			

=== District 138 ===
Maine House of Representatives district 138 general election, 2018
Party	Candidate	Votes	%
Democratic	Robert Alley (incumbent)	2,056	55.92%
Republican	Kimberley Robinson	1,621	44.08%
Total votes		3,677	100.0
Democratic hold			

=== District 139 ===
Maine House of Representatives district 139 general election, 2018
Party	Candidate	Votes	%
Republican	William Tuell (incumbent)	2,708	71.11%
Democratic	Lisa Hanscom	1,100	28.89%
Total votes		3,808	100.0
Republican hold			

=== District 140 ===
Maine House of Representatives district 140 general election, 2018
Party	Candidate	Votes	%
Democratic	Anne Perry (incumbent)	1,957	60.22%
Republican	Arthur Carter	1,293	39.78%
Total votes		3,250	100.0
Democratic hold			

=== District 141 ===
Maine House of Representatives district 141 general election, 2018
Party	Candidate	Votes	%
Republican	Kathy Javner	2,517	73.64%
Democratic	Donald Green	901	26.36%
Total votes		3,418	100.0
Republican hold			

=== District 142 ===
Maine House of Representatives district 142 general election, 2018
Party	Candidate	Votes	%
Republican	Sheldon Hanington (incumbent)	2,034	63.21%
Democratic	Patricia Nobel	1,184	36.79%
Total votes		3,218	100.0
Republican hold			

=== District 143 ===
Maine House of Representatives district 143 general election, 2018
Party	Candidate	Votes	%
Democratic	Stephen Stanley (incumbent)	2,185	58.96%
Republican	Galen Hale	1,521	41.04%
Total votes		3,706	100.0
Democratic hold			

=== District 144 ===
Maine House of Representatives district 144 general election, 2018
Party	Candidate	Votes	%
Republican	Gregory Swallow	1,773	55.05%
Democratic	Ted Sussman	1,481	44.95%
Total votes		3,221	100.0
Republican hold			

=== District 145 ===
Maine House of Representatives district 145 general election, 2018
Party	Candidate	Votes	%
Republican	Chris Johansen (incumbent)	2,281	66.52%
Democratic	Laura Farnsworth	1,148	33.48%
Total votes		3,429	100.0
Republican hold			

=== District 146 ===
Maine House of Representatives district 146 general election, 2018
Party	Candidate	Votes	%
Republican	Dustin White (incumbent)	2,456	65.25%
Democratic	Sarah LeClaire	1,308	34.75%
Total votes		2,764	100.0
Republican hold			

=== District 147 ===
Maine House of Representatives district 147 general election, 2018
Party	Candidate	Votes	%
Republican	Harold "Trey" Stewart III (incumbent)	1,737	58.04%
Democratic	Robert Saucier	1,256	41.96%
Total votes		2,993	100.0
Republican hold			

=== District 148 ===
Maine House of Representatives district 148 general election, 2018
Party	Candidate	Votes	%
Democratic	David McCrea (incumbent)	2,240	66.39%
Republican	Katherine Schupbach	1,134	33.61%
Total votes		3,374	100.0
Democratic hold			

=== District 149 ===
Maine House of Representatives district 149 general election, 2018
Party	Candidate	Votes	%
Republican	John DeVeau	2,649	100.0
Total votes		2,649	100.0
Republican hold			

=== District 150 ===
Maine House of Representatives district 150 general election, 2018
Party	Candidate	Votes	%
Democratic	Roland Martin (incumbent)	2,272	60.65%
Republican	Aaron Cyr	1,474	39.35%
Total votes		3,746	100.0
Democratic hold			

=== District 151 ===
Maine House of Representatives district 151 general election, 2018
Party	Candidate	Votes	%
Democratic	John L. Martin (incumbent)	2,254	59.30%
Republican	Kevin Bushey	1,527	40.70%
Total votes		3,801	100.0
Democratic hold			

== See also ==
- 2018 United States elections
- 2018 United States Senate election in Maine
- 2018 United States House of Representatives elections in Maine
- 2018 Maine gubernatorial election
- 2018 Maine State Senate election
- June 2018 Maine Question 1
- List of Maine state legislatures
