= Thomas Harnett =

American politician

Member of the Maine House of Representatives from the 83rd district
- In office December 5, 2018 – December 6, 2022
- Preceded by: Gay Grant
- Succeeded by: Walter Riseman

Personal details
- Party: Democratic
- Education: Fordham University, New York University

Thomas Harnett is an American politician who served two terms as a member of the Maine House of Representatives representing the 83rd district from 2018 to 2022. He also served six years as mayor of Gardiner, Maine.
