= Doore =

Doore may refer to:

- Donna Doore, American politician
- Doore Doore Oru Koodu Koottam, Indian film

== See also ==
- Door
