= Jennifer Parker =

Jennifer Parker may refer to:

- Jennifer Parker (Back to the Future), a character in the film series Back to the Future
- Jennifer D. Parker, American statistician
- Jennifer Parker (politician), member of the Maine House of Representatives
