= Ralph Chapman (politician) =

American politician (born 1951)

Member of the Maine House of Representatives from the 133rd district
- In office December 3, 2014 – January 3, 2019
- Preceded by: Barry J. Hobbins
- Succeeded by: Sarah Pebworth

Member of the Maine House of Representatives from the 37th district
- In office December 1, 2010 – December 3, 2014
- Preceded by: James M. Schatz
- Succeeded by: Richard R. Farnsworth

Personal details
- Born: February 5, 1951 (age 75)
- Party: Green Independent (since 2017)
- Other political affiliations: Democratic (before 2017); Independent (2017)
- Education: Tufts University

Ralph Chapman (born February 5, 1951) is a former Green member of the Maine House of Representatives. He represented the 133rd district, which covers parts of Hancock County. Originally elected as a Democrat, he later became an independent and finally a Green under the Maine Green Independent Party since September 22, 2017.

== Biography ==
Chapman graduated from Tufts University in 1973. He worked as the principal and technical director of LEO Engineering from 1987 until 1993 and was consultant and owner of Ralph Chapman Consulting from 2000 until 2003. Beginning in 2003, he served as coordinator and instructor of United Technologies Center.

Chapman was first elected to the House in 2010, and reelected in 2012, 2014, and 2016. On May 26, 2017, Chapman, along with fellow representative Denise Harlow, unenrolled from the Democratic Party and became an independent. Both were speculated to have unenrolled due to their opposition to a bill which would allow open-pit mining in the state of Maine. On September 22, 2017, Chapman became a member of the Maine Green Independent Party. He is the first Green Party legislator in Maine since John Eder, who served from 2003 until 2007 and the first Green Party state legislator in the country since Fred Smith of Arkansas, who was elected as a Green but became a Democrat in 2014.

Chapman was term-limited in 2018 and left office in January 2019.

== Personal life ==
Chapman and his wife, Rebecca, have 5 children.

== Political positions ==
For the 2016 United States presidential election, Chapman endorsed Bernie Sanders. He also is an advocate of environmental issues.

== Electoral history ==
Maine House District 37 Democratic primary, 2010
Party	Candidate	Votes	%
Democratic	Ralph Chapman	580	53.02
Democratic	J. Benjamin Wootten	514	46.98
Total votes		1,094	100.00

Maine House District 37 election, 2010
Party	Candidate	Votes	%
Democratic	Ralph Chapman	2,266	50.39
Republican	Madeleine Gay Leach	2,231	49.61
Total votes		4,497	100.00

Maine House District 37 Democratic primary, 2012
Party	Candidate	Votes	%
Democratic	Ralph Chapman	436	59.97
Democratic	James M. Schatz	291	40.03
Total votes		727	100.00

Maine House District 37 election, 2012
Party	Candidate	Votes	%
Democratic	Ralph Chapman	2,958	55.74
Republican	Sherman H. Hutchins	2,349	44.26
Total votes		5,307	100.00

Maine House District 133 election, 2014
Party	Candidate	Votes	%
Democratic	Ralph Chapman	2,481	57.30
Republican	Susan Walsh	1,849	42.70
Total votes		4,330	100.00

Maine House District 133 election, 2016
Party	Candidate	Votes	%
Democratic	Ralph Chapman	3,074	57.62
Republican	Nancy Faye Colwell	2,261	42.38
Total votes		5,335	100.00
