= Chloe Maxmin =

American politician from Maine

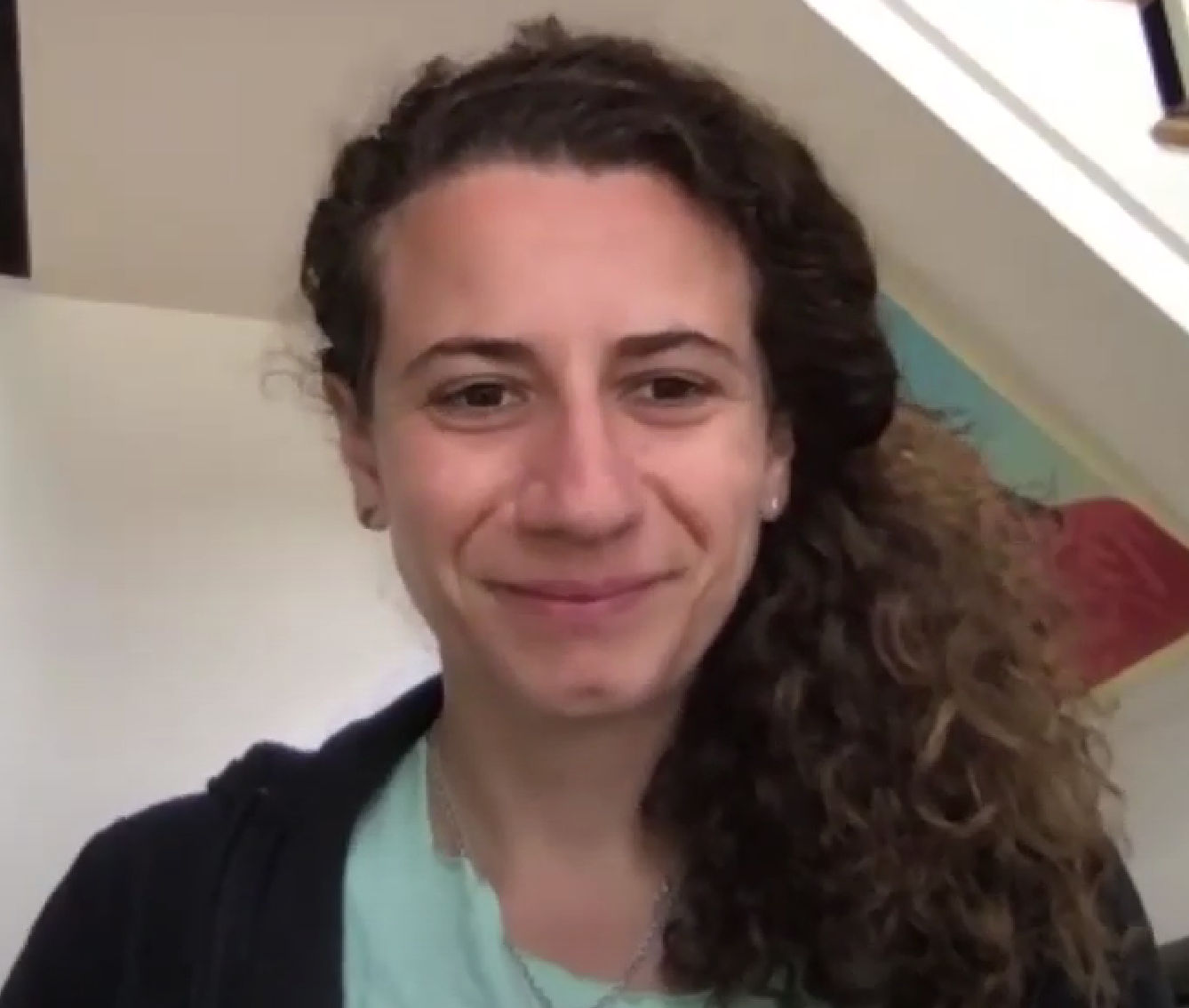
- Maxmin in 2020

Member of the Maine Senate from the 13th district
- In office December 2, 2020 – December 7, 2022
- Preceded by: Dana Dow
- Succeeded by: Cameron Reny

Member of the Maine House of Representatives from the 88th district
- In office December 5, 2018 – December 2, 2020
- Preceded by: Deborah Sanderson
- Succeeded by: Michael Lemelin

Personal details
- Born: 1992 (age 33–34)
- Party: Democratic
- Parent: Shoshana Zuboff (mother)
- Education: Harvard University (AB)
- Website: chloe.mainecandidate.com

Chloe Sophia Maxmin (born 1992) is an American Democratic politician and environmental activist who served as the Maine State Senator for District 13. A resident of Nobleboro, she was elected to the Maine House of Representatives in November 2018 and to the Maine Senate in November 2020, defeating incumbent Minority Leader Dana Dow. Maxmin was the first Democrat ever to represent Maine House District 88, the youngest member of the 129th Maine Legislature, and is the youngest female state senator in Maine's history. She is the co-owner of Begin Again Farm in Warren, Maine with Bill Pluecker.

== Early life and education ==
Maxmin was born in 1992 and grew up on a venison farm in Nobleboro, Maine. She attended Lincoln Academy. Inspired by a 2005 proposal by Plum Creek Development Company to develop Moosehead Lake in the North Maine Woods, she founded the Lincoln Academy Climate Action Club as a ninth grader.. Her late father, Jim Maxmin, was a CEO of Volvo, and her mother, Shoshana Zuboff, is an academic and author. She is Jewish.

The Climate Action Club conducted a massive reusable shopping bag campaign, established a no-idling policy on the Lincoln Academy campus, recycled 4,000 batteries and won a $5,000 national award to install solar panels at the school. In part for her work with the Climate Action Club, Maxmin was featured on the "Communities" episode during Season 3 of Big Ideas for a Small Planet in 2009 and was one of ten national winners of the Gloria Barron Prize for Young Heroes in 2010.

Maxmin graduated from Lincoln Academy in 2010 and attended Harvard University beginning in the fall of 2011. At Harvard, Maxmin led the Community Action Committee and co-founded the Divest Harvard campaign focused on ending the University's endowment relationship with fossil fuel companies. Divest Harvard began with 10 participants in 2012 and grew to almost 70,000 by 2015.

Maxmin was named a Green Hero by Rolling Stone, and received an annual Brower Youth Award, both in 2013. In 2014, the Maine Women's Fund presented her with the 2014 Samantha Smith Award for her youth activism and work toward social change.

Maxmin graduated from Harvard University in 2015 with a degree in social studies and a minor in environmental science and public policy and returned to Maine.

== Political career ==
=== Maine State House ===
In February 2018, Maxmin announced her candidacy for District 88 representative to the Maine House of Representatives. In the Democratic primary on June 12, 2018, she defeated Alan Plummer 80%-20%. In the 2018 Maine House of Representatives general election, Maxmin defeated Republican Michael Lemelin 53%-47%, becoming the first Democrat ever to represent House District 88 and the youngest woman in the Maine State Legislature.

Maxmin served as a member of the Joint Standing Committee on Agriculture, Conservation and Forestry in the 129th Maine Legislature. In March 2019, she introduced the “Act to Establish a Green New Deal for Maine”, and on April 16, 2019, the Maine AFL-CIO announced its support for the bill. This was the first time a state AFL-CIO chapter has endorsed a Green New Deal proposal. Although the final bill was significantly smaller than the original (it was pared from five sections down to two), it passed the Maine Legislature in June 2019 and was signed into law by Governor Janet Mills on June 17, 2019.

Maxmin is a graduate of the Emerge Maine candidate training program.

=== Maine State Senate ===
On January 13, 2020, Maxmin announced her candidacy for Maine State Senate District 13. She was unopposed in the Democratic primary and received all 5,335 votes cast. In the 2020 Maine State Senate general election, Maxmin defeated incumbent Senate Minority Leader Dana Dow 51%-49% becoming the youngest female state senator in Maine's history.

Rural Runner, a short film about Maxmin's 2020 Maine State Senate race, was released in October 2020.

In January 2021, Maxmin was one of over 70 lawmakers to sign a letter asking the Maine Public Utilities Commission to reinstate a moratorium on power disconnections during the COVID-19 pandemic in Maine.

In February 2021, she was appointed by Senate president Troy Jackson to the Maine Climate Council.

In May 2021 she appeared on Fox News making the claim from her book that Democrats have abandoned rural America

On January 12, 2022 Chloe Maxmin announced she decided not to seek re-election and would leave office on December 7, 2022.

== Electoral history ==
=== 2018 Maine House District 88 ===
2018 Maine House of Representatives District 88 Primary Election
Party	Candidate	Votes	%
Democratic	Chloe Maxmin	730	79.9%
Democratic	Alan Plummer	184	20.1%
Total votes		914	100.0%

2018 Maine House of Representatives District 88 General Election
Party	Candidate	Votes	%
Democratic	Chloe Maxmin	2,272	52.52%
Republican	Michael Lemelin	2,054	47.48%
Total votes		4,326	100.0%
Democratic gain from Republican			

=== 2020 Maine State Senate ===
2020 Maine State Senate District 13 Primary Election
Party	Candidate	Votes	%
Democratic	Chloe Maxmin	5,335	100.0%
Total votes		5,335	100.0%

2020 Maine State Senate District 13 General Election
Party	Candidate	Votes	%
Democratic	Chloe Maxmin	12,806	51.5%
Republican	Dana Dow (incumbent)	12,072	48.5%
Total votes		24,878	100.0%
Democratic gain from Republican			

== Works ==
- with Canyon Woodward, Dirt Road Revival: How to Rebuild Rural Politics and Why Our Future Depends On It, ISBN 978-080700751-8
