= Beth Turner =

American politician (born 1958)

Beth Peloquin Turner

Member of the Maine House of Representatives from the 141st district
- In office March 2011 – December 2018
- Preceded by: Everett McLeod
- Succeeded by: Kathy Irene Javner

Personal details
- Born: May 13, 1958 (age 68) Maine
- Party: Republican
- Spouse: Stanley Turner

Beth P. Turner (born May 13, 1958 in Maine) is an American politician who served as a member of the Maine House of Representatives for the 141st district from 2011 to 2018. She was first elected on March 1, 2011, in a special election following the death of Rep. Everett McLeod in December 2010.

Turner served on the MSAD 31 School Board and the Select Board in her hometown of Burlington, Maine prior to her election the House of Representatives.
