= Lester Ordway =

American politician

Member of the Maine House of Representatives from the 23rd district
- In office December 7, 2015 – December 7, 2022
- Preceded by: Michael Shaw
- Succeeded by: Amy Roeder

Personal details
- Party: Republican
- Education: University of Southern Maine

Lester Ordway is an American politician and college instructor at Central Maine Community College. He served as a Republican member for the 23rd district of the Maine House of Representatives.

Ordway is a resident of Standish, Maine and attended the University of Southern Maine. In 2015, he was elected for the 23rd district of the Maine House of Representatives. Ordway succeeded Michael Shaw. He assumed his office on December 7, 2015.
