= Mark Eves =

American politician

101st Speaker of the Maine House of Representatives
- In office December 5, 2012 – December 6, 2016
- Preceded by: Robert Nutting
- Succeeded by: Sara Gideon

Member of the Maine House of Representatives from the 146th district
- In office 2008–2016
- Succeeded by: Dustin White

Personal details
- Born: March 16, 1977 (age 49) Northern California, U.S.
- Party: Democratic
- Education: University of Louisville (BS); Louisville Seminary (MS)
- Website: Campaign website

Mark W. Eves is an American politician and family counselor who served as a member of the Maine House of Representatives for the 146th district from 2008 to 2014. He was also a Democratic candidate in the 2018 Maine gubernatorial election.

== Early life and education ==
Mark Eves was born in Northern California to Arthur Eves, a former military chaplain during World War II, and his mother, a school teacher. The Eves family moved to Oregon when he was three months old. He is the youngest of seven children. When he was five, his family moved again, this time to Italy so that his father could study to become a Montessori teacher. His family later moved to Arizona and later to Louisville, Kentucky, where Eves settled at age 11. He earned a Bachelor of Science degree from the University of Louisville and a Master of Science from the Louisville Presbyterian Theological Seminary.

== Career ==
=== Maine Legislature ===
In 2008, he was elected to the Maine House of Representatives from District 146, North Berwick. He was re-elected in 2010 and 2012 before being chosen as the Speaker of the Maine House of Representatives for the 126th Maine Legislature (2012–2014). From 2010 to 2012, Eves was the ranking minority member of the Health and Human Services committee.

In the November 2014 general election, the Democrats lost control of the Maine Senate but retained a narrow majority in the Maine House of Representatives. The legislature subsequently re-elected Eves as Speaker.

During his time in the legislature, Eves focused on efforts to help seniors maintain independence and lower living costs. According to the Bangor Daily News, "He led efforts to provide direct-care workers with raises and in 2014 sponsored a successful property tax relief bill that included an extra benefit for homeowners older than 65. In 2015, Eves proposed a $15 million senior citizen housing bond, which was approved by more than 69 percent of voters at referendum."

On June 30, 2014, the Talking Points Memo website claimed that some Maine adherents to the sovereign citizen movement had called for Eves and fellow Democratic Senate President Justin Alfond to be tried, convicted, and executed for treason during meetings with Governor Paul LePage in 2013. LePage denied that such discussions took place, even after learning that audio recordings exist of two men claiming such a discussion took place.

=== 2018 gubernatorial campaign ===
On July 13, 2017, Eves announced he was running for the Democratic nomination for Governor of Maine. As part of his announcement, his campaign touted "under Eves' leadership the Legislature passed a bipartisan middle-class tax cut, boosted property tax relief for all Maine families, and strengthened investments in Maine's children, seniors and workers."

On February 24, 2018, former Bangor Mayor Sean Faircloth suspended his campaign for governor and endorsed Eves.

== Controversies ==
=== Charter school creation ===
In September 2012, Good Will-Hinckley, a private, not-for-profit organization located in Fairfield, Maine, opened a charter school called the Maine Academy of Natural Sciences ("MeANS"). As part of the 2013–2015 Maine State budget, MeANS received approximately $1,060,000 in discretionary funding from the State. The president of Good Will-Hinckley at the time was Glenn Cummings, the former Democratic Speaker of the Maine House of Representatives who had opposed charter schools while serving in the legislature.

=== Subsequent hiring process ===
In September 2014, Good Will-Hinckley initiated a nationwide search for a new president after Cummings resigned.

Bill Brown, who worked for Eves in the State Legislature, later testified that, at the request of former Speaker Cummings, he informed Eves of the job opening and suggested that Eves apply. Brown, who was also the chairman of MeANS's board at the time, helped Eves organize his resume but did not provide assistance to any of the other applicants.

Of the nineteen applications received, six candidates were selected to be interviewed, including Eves. Brown, in addition to being present for the hiring committee's interviews of Eves, also sat in on the interviews for all of the other candidates and commented on aspects of Eves' candidacy to other interview committee members. The committee eventually unanimously voted to offer Speaker Eves the position previously held by former Speaker Cummings.

On June 5, 2015, Eves signed an employment agreement with Good Will-Hinckley.

=== LePage funding threats and subsequent firing ===
When Governor LePage learned of Eves' selection, he contacted Good Will-Hinckley criticizing Eves as a "hack" and urging them to reconsider their decision. Governor LePage indicated that he would be withdrawing all support from Good Will-Hinckley as long as Eves remained as President of the organization and described Eves as "a longtime opponent of public charter schools". LePage thereafter stated that he would not send any more discretionary funding to Good Will-Hinckley, although he took no steps to reduce or eliminate funding allocated for Good Will-Hinckley in the proposed budget.

LePage went on to say "He [Eves] worked his entire political career to oppose and threaten charter schools in Maine. He is the mouthpiece for the Maine Education Association. Giving taxpayers' money to a person who has fought so hard against charter schools would be unconscionable." "Former legislator Paul Violette, the past head of the Maine Turnpike Authority, went to jail for enriching himself and misappropriating public money. . . . These former legislators used their political positions to land cushy, high-paying jobs in which they were trusted to use taxpayer money to improve the lives of Mainers. They abused that trust and had to face the consequences of their actions. The same is true of Mark Eves."

On June 24, 2015, Good Will-Hinckley fired Eves.

=== Civil lawsuit against LePage ===
Eves, as well as Republican State Sen. Roger Katz, criticized LePage for attacking Eves' personal livelihood and family. Eves filed a civil lawsuit against LePage on July 30, 2015, asserting illegal retaliation and blackmail. Eves said he and his office would not be involved in any legislative actions against LePage.

On May 3, 2016, U.S. District Judge George Singal dismissed Eves' lawsuit, finding that Governor LePage was entitled to immunity from suit for his actions as the discretion afforded LePage "clearly encompasses advocating for his preferred charter school policy" and the "dispurs[ment of] funds" for MeANS.

On January 26, 2018, the full United States Court of Appeals for the First Circuit in Boston agreed to hear Eves' case, after it had been rejected by a three-judge panel of the court.

== Personal life ==
He met his wife, Laura, while both were seeking master's degrees in marriage and family therapy at Louisville Presbyterian. The pair settled in North Berwick, Maine, around 2002 and have three children.
