= Lawrence Lockman =

American politician

Member of the Maine House of Representatives from the 137th district
- In office December 2014 – December 2020
- Preceded by: Alan Casavant
- Succeeded by: Meldon (Micky) Carmichael

Member of the Maine House of Representatives from the 30th district
- In office December 2012 – December 2014
- Preceded by: Howard McFadden
- Succeeded by: Kim Monaghan-Derrig

Personal details
- Party: Republican

Lawrence E. Lockman is an American lumber worker, lobbyist, political activist, and politician from Amherst, Maine. He was a Republican member of the Maine House of Representatives from 2012 through 2020. Lockman ran for the Maine State Senate, challenging incumbent state Senator Kimberley Rosen in its 2020 Republican primary, but was unsuccessful.

== Early life, family and education ==
Lockman is a 1967 graduate of Philadelphia-Montgomery Christian Academy in Jenkintown, Pennsylvania. He studied liberal arts at Covenant College in Lookout Mountain, Georgia and Pasadena City College in California.

== Career ==
Around 1976, he began working at a sawmill in Passadumkeag, Maine. In 1990, Lockman was part of a group seeking to break the union at the Passadumkeag sawmill where he worked, a drive which was defeated by an 81 to 18 vote. He left the mill in 1992 to work as a territory manager in eastern Maine for the National Federation of Independent Business, a position he held until 2010. He works as a territory manager in eastern and central Maine for National Write Your Congressman.

== Activity as politician and candidate ==
In 1986 and 1988, Lockman ran in District 143 of the Maine House of Representatives against the incumbent Democrat Michael Michaud. He lost both, finishing with 639 votes to Michaud's 2,438.

In 2012, Lockman was elected to the House's District 30, which included portions of Hancock and Washington counties, with 2,188 votes to 2,082 for Democrat Dennis Mahar. Lockman was a strong supporter of Maine's governor Paul LePage, who was challenged for re-election in the 2014 race by Lockman's previous opponent, Michael Michaud (who in 2013 came out as gay).

== Controversies ==
In 1975, Lockman stopped paying federal and state income taxes and founded a group called Maine Patriots which put forth various tax protester arguments and urged other Mainers to follow his example.

In the mid-to-late 1980s, Lockman switched his emphasis to activism about HIV, the AIDS epidemic, and homosexuality. In a letter to the Lewiston Daily Sun, Lockman wrote "Clearly the practice of sodomy is learned behavior, and those addicted to this form of biologically-insane sex are at high risk for all manner of serious medical problems."

In 1991, Lockman became one of the directors of the Pro Life Education Association, a Maine-based anti abortion organization. In a 1995 letter in the Sun Journal in Lewiston, a reader quoted a press statement by Lockman, then part of the Pro Life Education Association, saying, "If a woman has (the right to an abortion), why shouldn't a man be free to use his superior strength to force himself on a woman? At least the rapist’s pursuit of sexual freedom doesn’t (in most cases) result in anyone's death."

In a 1995 op-ed, Lockman warned of a "secret gay affirmative action plan," claiming "You can bet the rent money they will demand that employers set up goals and timetables to achieve 10 percent homosexual representation in the workforce and in government contracts."

=== Response ===
Lockman has released a statement saying "I have always been passionate about my beliefs, and years ago I said things that I regret. I hold no animosity toward anyone by virtue of their gender or sexual orientation, and today I am focused on ensuring freedom and economic prosperity for all Mainers."

== Personal life ==
Lockman and his wife Debbie were married in 1974. They have four children and five grandchildren.
