= White City (Philadelphia) =

Former amusement park in Erdenheim, Pennsylvania

White City (Philadelphia), originally known as Chestnut Hill Park, was an amusement park in Erdenheim, Pennsylvania. It was established in 1898 by the Chestnut Hill Casino Company, and operated until 1912, when it was shut down after continued complaints from residents of the area.

== Creation of Chestnut Hill Park ==
In February 1898, the Chestnut Hill Casino Company purchased 25 acres of land in Springfield Township at the northwest corner of Bethlehem Pike and Paper Mill Road. Their intent was to provide a park for the middle-to-working class of Philadelphia and Norristown with a trolley fare of only five cents. Within three months, the amusement park was completed. It was originally scheduled to open in May, but the opening had to be pushed back to June 11 because of heavy rains. It became a White City amusement park in 1906.

== Attractions and exhibits ==
At its opening, the park was described by The Philadelphia Inquirer as a "veritable fairyland scene". It claimed to have 50,000 fragrant plants, as well as a toboggan, a carousel, a lake with row boats, electric launches, and a live brass band conducted by Professor Kalitz. More amusement rides and other attractions were later built, such as a roller coaster, a pony track, and a roller skating rink. Events and entertainment were often hosted, such as athletic meets, vaudeville performances, acrobats and gymnasts, and the presentation of a trained baby elephant named Little Hip.

The park received major reconstruction and redecoration in 1906 when it was renamed White City Park. The park saw its most successful year in 1911.

== Criticism and closure ==
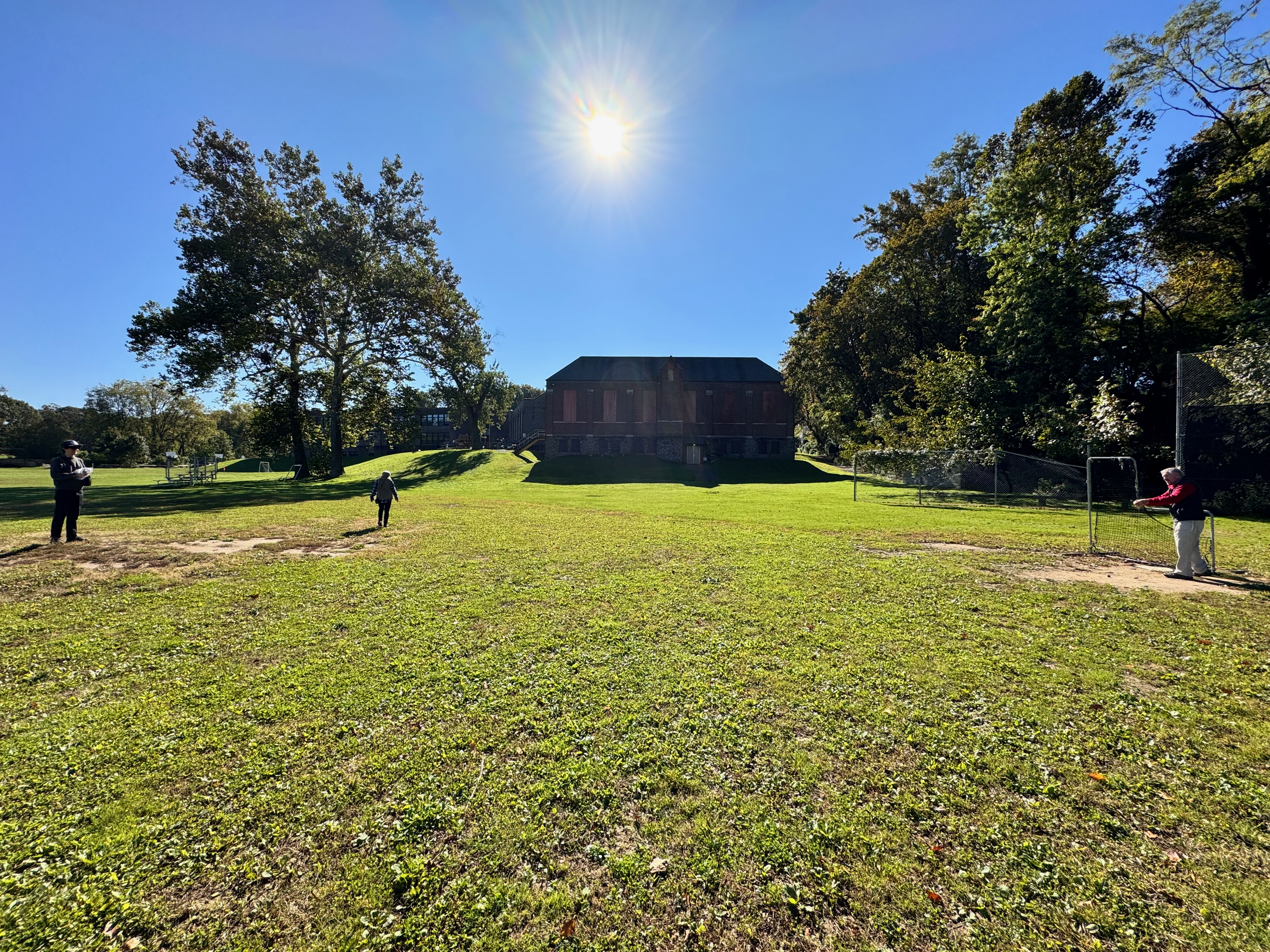
A baseball field and school now occupy the site of the former White City Park

Many upper class residents of the area resented the lower class visitors who frequented the park, claiming it depreciated the desirability and value of the suburb. In February 1912, several wealthy locals including George C. Thomas Jr., Charles N. Welsh, Wilson Potter, and Jay Cooke III combined their money, bought the park for about $500,000, and immediately shut it down before its opening in the coming spring. After demolishing it, the land remained vacant until 1927, when Springfield Township High School was built on part of it. The school now operates as the Philadelphia-Montgomery Christian Academy. A small pond is all that remains of the park and its lake today.
