= Philadelphia-Montgomery Christian Academy =

Coordinates: 40.089074°N 75.211787°W

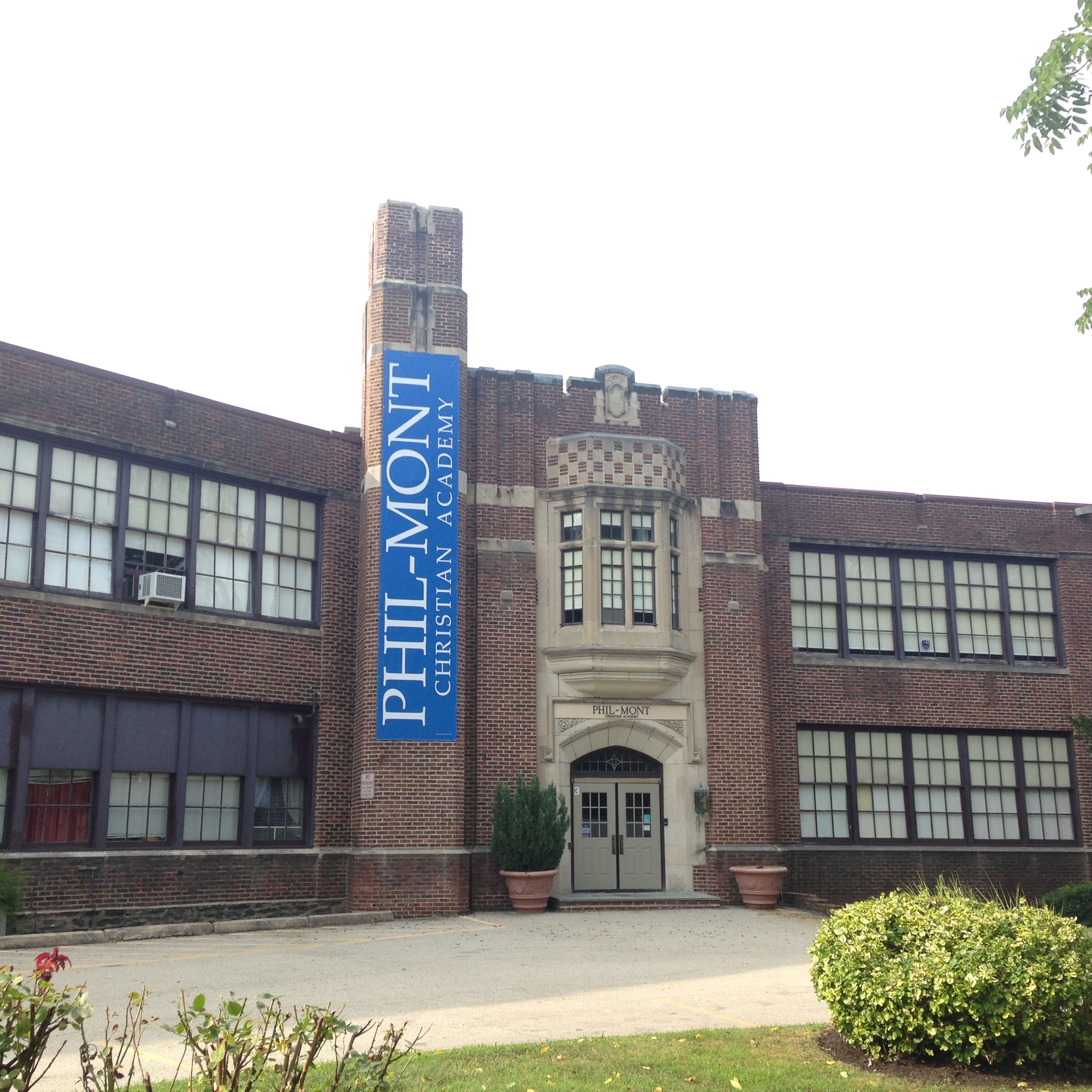

Location
- 35 Hillcrest Avenue; Erdenheim, Pennsylvania 19038; United States

Information
- School type: Private school
- Established: 1943
- School district: Springfield Township School District
- Head teacher: Todd Mangum
- Grades: PK-12
- Campus type: Suburban
- Colors: Blue and White
- Mascot: Falcon
- Publication: The Signet
- Yearbook: Philotheon
- Information: 215-233-0782
- Website: https://www.phil-mont.com/

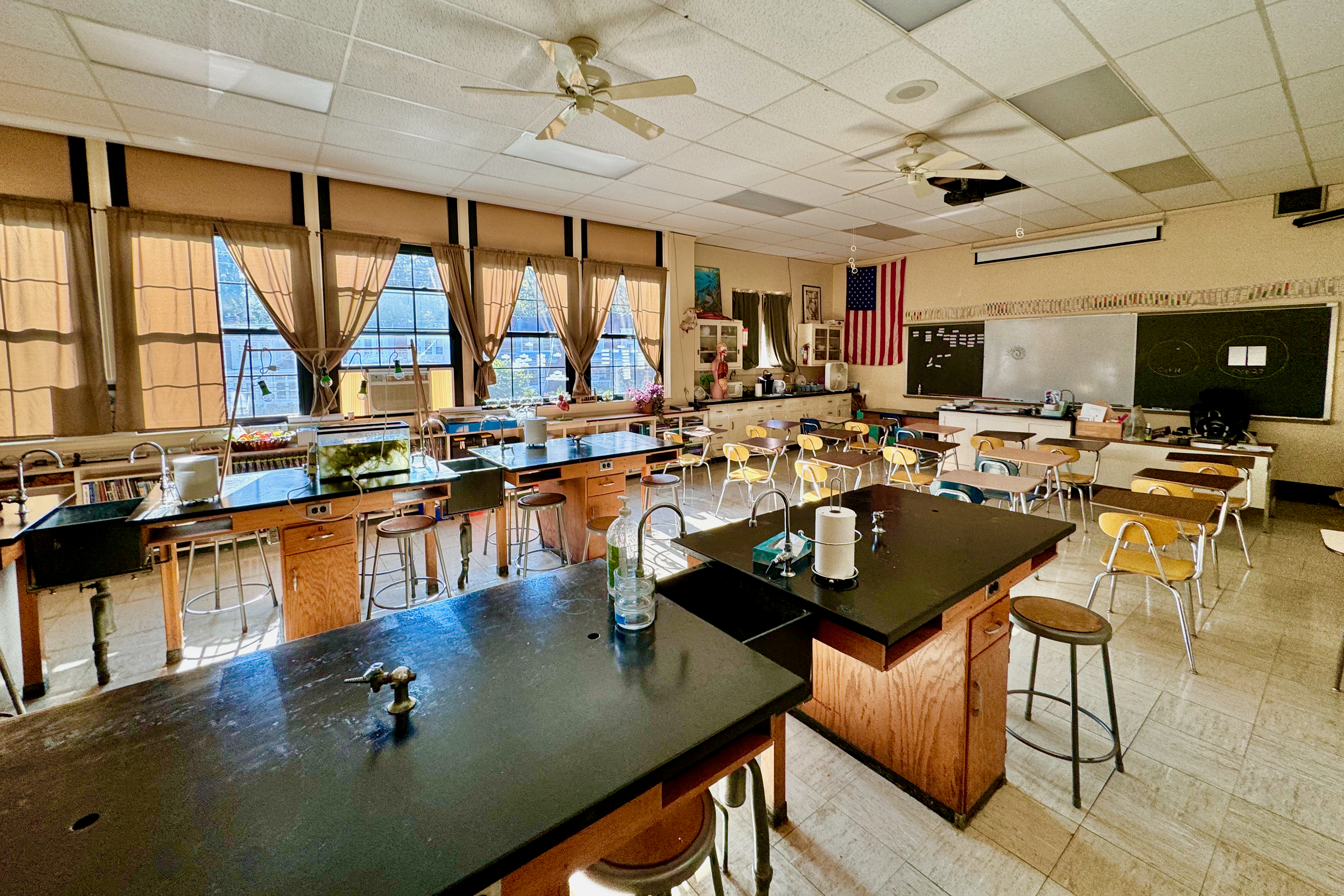
A Phil-Mont science classroom

Philadelphia-Montgomery Christian Academy, commonly known as Phil-Mont Christian Academy, is a selective private Christian school serving grades PK-12. Phil-Mont was founded in 1943 by Cornelius Van Til and others. Phil-Mont's curriculum is rooted in a Christian worldview, the principles of the liberal arts, and uses some features of a classical education model. Phil-Mont currently resides in the former Springfield Township High School & Hillcrest Junior High School building, built in 1923/24. Phil-Mont purchased the unused building and restored it to working order for grades 7-12 in 1979. The property was originally part of Chestnut Hill Park/White City Amusement Park, part of which is now also Springfield Township's James A. Cisco Park and Hillcrest Pond.

== Athletics ==
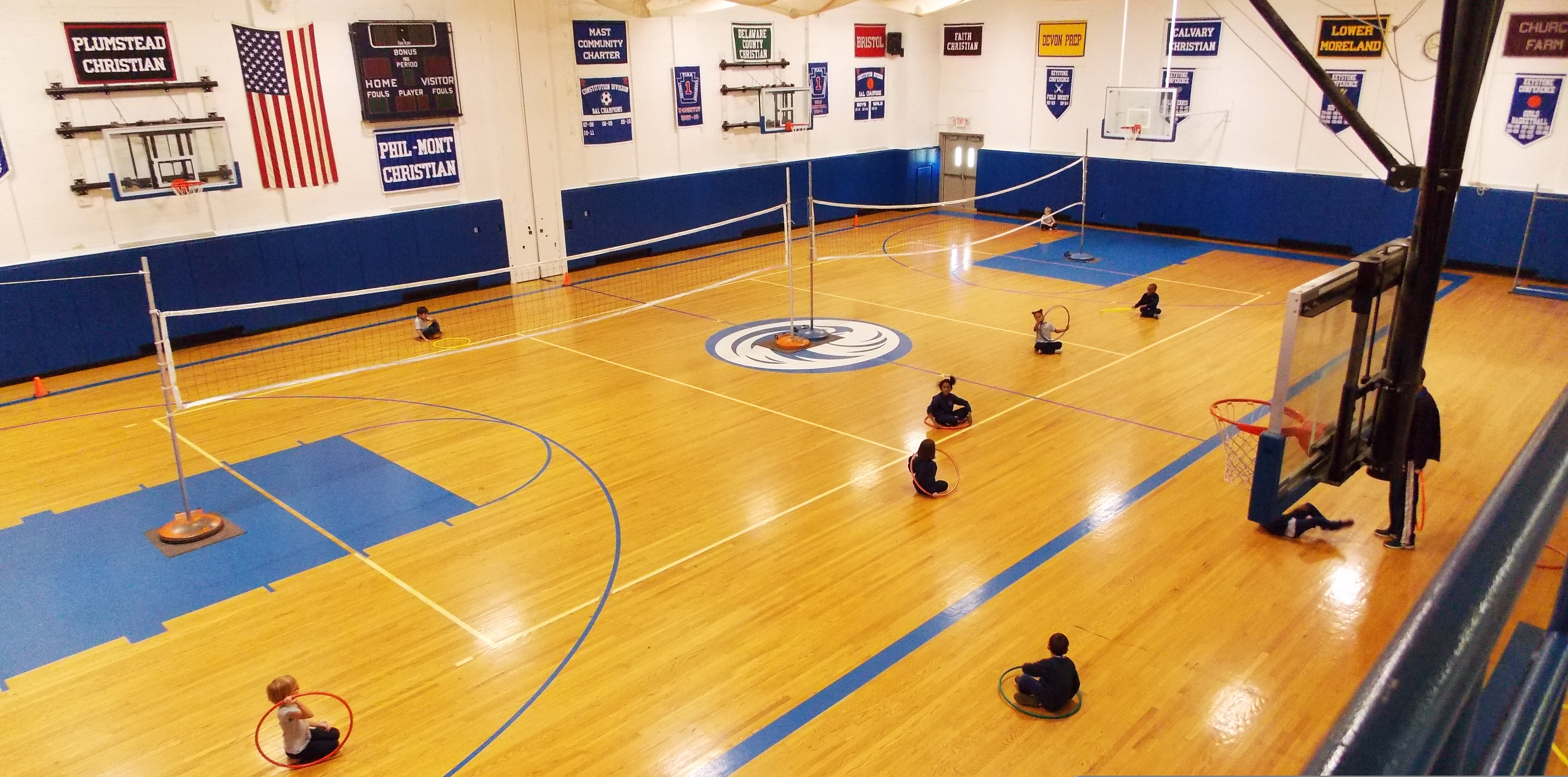
The Phil-Mont gymnasium

Over half of the student body participates on a team each year and several of the school's alumni return to serve their alma mater as coaches. Starting back in the 1960s, Phil-Mont was a member of the Keystone Scholastic Athletic Conference. This was a close-knit league made up of smaller-sized private schools within the surrounding counties. During their tenure within the KSAC, Phil-Mont won championships in boys' soccer, cross country, basketball, baseball, and tennis. Girls' championships were achieved in field hockey, tennis, basketball, and softball.

In 2007, Phil-Mont became a Class A member of the PIAA District One and joined the Bicentennial Athletic League. This new league, comprising both private and public schools, provides strong local competition along with the opportunity for teams as well as individuals to advance into District, Regional, and State Championships.

League and District Championships Since 2007

Soccer (B) '07 -'08, '08 -'09, '09 -'10, '10 -'11

X-Country (B) '07 -'08, '08 -'09

Basketball (B) '10 -'11, '13 -'14, '15 -'16

Basketball (G) '13 -'14, '14 -'15, '15 -'16

== Fine Arts ==
=== Art ===
Art class at Phil-Mont runs from Kindergarten through 12th grade, and includes AP Advanced Placement Art.

=== Drama ===
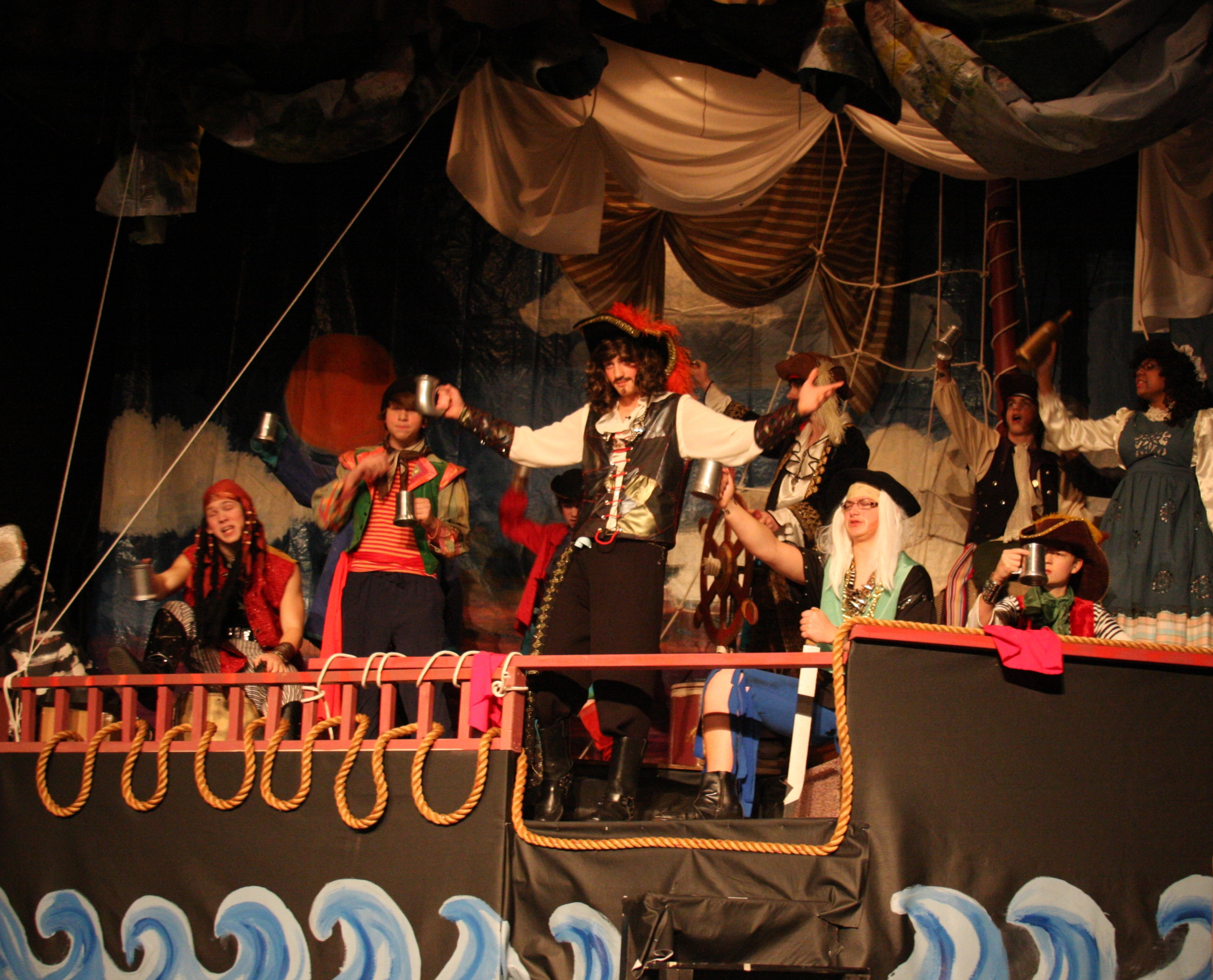
A Phil-Mont performance of The Pirates of Penzance

Phil-Mont hosts 3 stage performances a year, including a Fall Musical*, Winter Play**, and a Spring Fine Arts Festival*.

*Middle and High School combined

**High School only

=== Music ===
Music is taught at Phil-Mont at the elementary, middle, and high school levels.

	Elementary K-5th Grade	Middle School 6th-12th Grade	High School 9th-12th Grade
Instruments	Core*	Core* Other**	Core* Other**
Lessons	Yes	Yes	Independent Study
Classes	ES Band	MS Band	HS Band
Electives	None	Jazz Band MS Worship Team	Jazz Band HS Worship Team
Concerts	Christmas Spring	Christmas Spring ACSI Arts Festival	Christmas Spring ACSI Arts Festival

*Core Instruments: Clarinet, Flute, French Horn, Saxophone, Trumpet, Trombone, Percussion

**Other Instruments: Baritone Horn, Tuba, Saxophone

== History ==
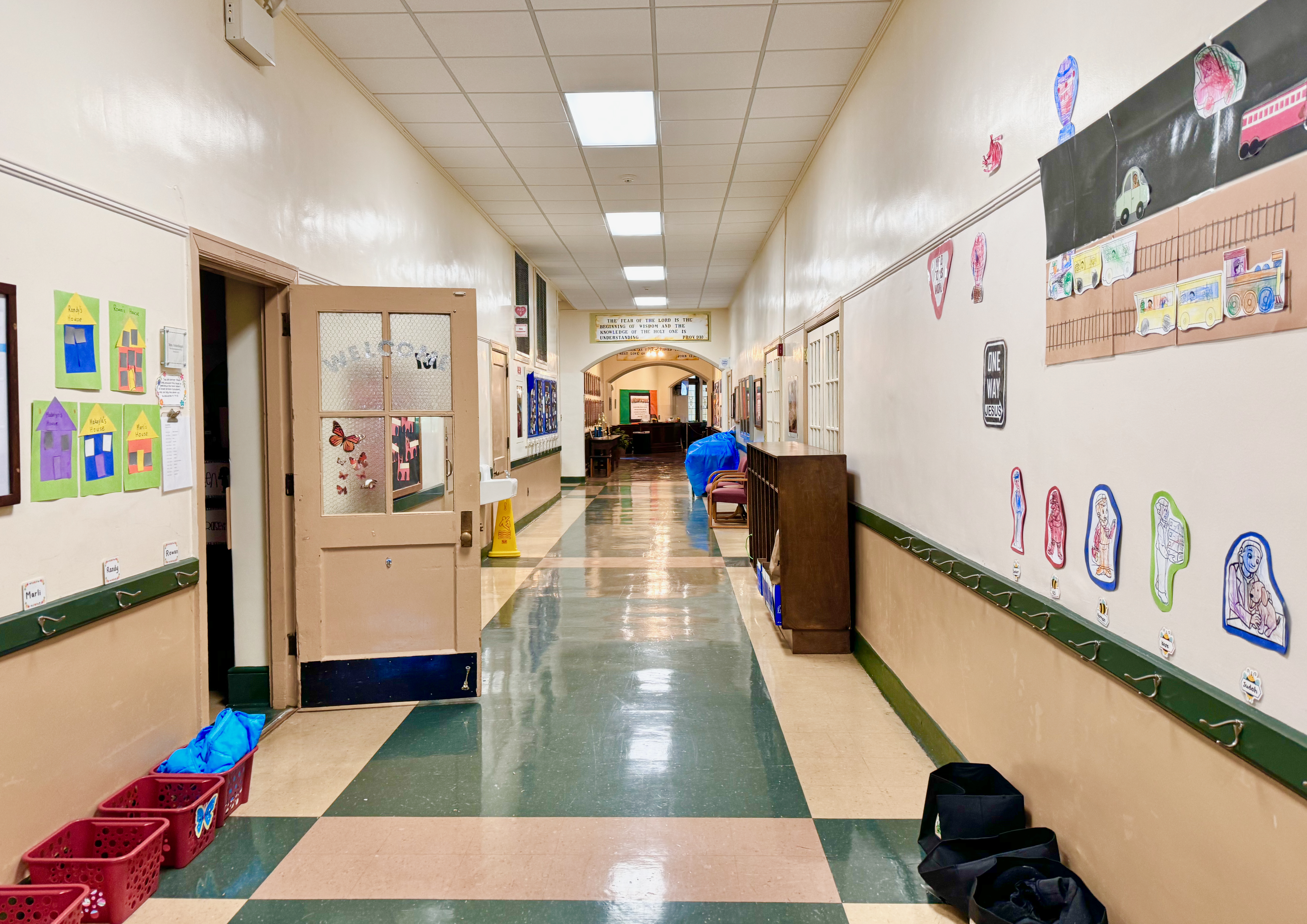
A Phil-Mont school hallway

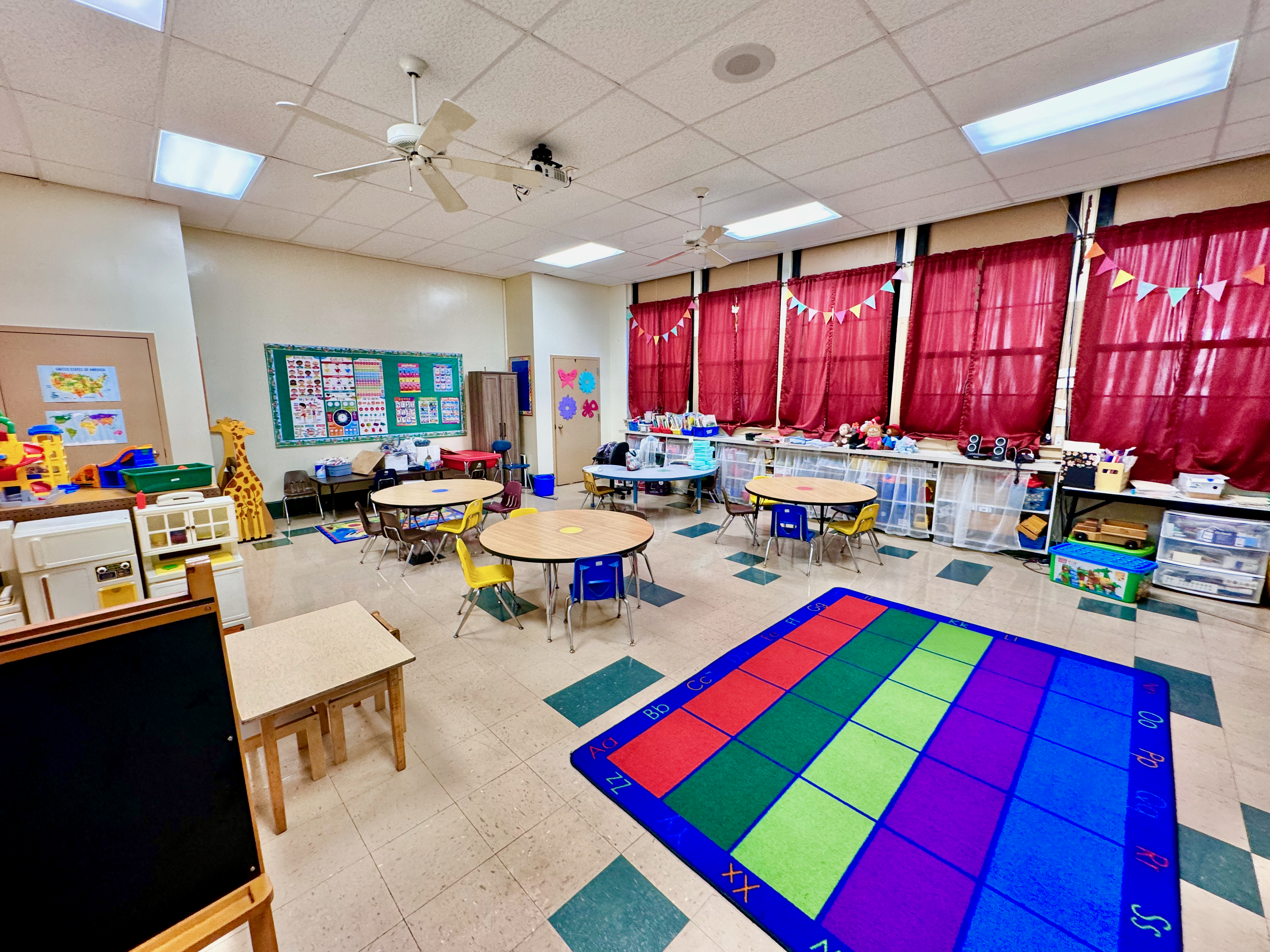
An early childhood classroom at Phil-Mont

In 1939, Dr. Cornelius Van Til gave a series of lectures at Calvary Pres. in Willow Grove, regarding the responsibility of Christian parents to train their children apart from the state schools. He was instrumental in leading a small group of families to start the Christian School Society of Willow Grove. Regarding the school's mission, Van Til wrote in the Presbyterian Guardian, "First of all, the instruction will be based entirely upon the assumption that the Christian religion is true. There will be prayer in this school, and Bible reading and catechism study.”

In September 1943, the first classes of the Willow Grove Christian Day School began with 1 teacher and 17 students in three elementary classes. The school met in the basement of Calvary Presbyterian Church in Willow Grove. The school grew to K–8 by 1955.

In 1956 the Philadelphia-Montgomery Christian High School began with 3 teachers and 34 ninth and tenth graders. The students met at the First Reformed Church of Germantown until the newly acquired Wyncote Elementary building was fixed up in preparation for grades 9–12.

In 1964–65, the elementary and high schools merged, becoming Philadelphia-Montgomery Christian Academy. In 1969 a new school facility, to house grades K–12, was built on a 20-acre site in nearby Dresher. In 1979 the former Hillcrest Junior High School was purchased to house the junior high and high schools (7-12). In 2006–07, the elementary, middle, and high schools merged on the Hillcrest campus.

== Press ==
In 2012, Philadelphia Magazine included Phil-Mont Christian Academy in their list, "Guide to (45) Great Private Schools" which ranks "the region’s best performers."

In 2021, nich.com ranked Phil-Mont #22 (out of 343) of Pennsylvania's most diverse private high schools, ranked Phil-Mont #14 (out of 82) of Pennsylvania's best Christian high schools, and ranked Phil-Mont #29 (out of 98) of Pennsylvania's best private K-12 schools

== Notable alumni ==
- Christian Smith - American Sociologist, and the William R. Kenan, Jr. Professor of Sociology and Director of the Center for the Study of Religion and Society at the University of Notre Dame.
- Lawrence E. Lockman - Representative (R) for District 137 in Maine's House of Representatives.
- Charles R. Gerow - Prominent American strategic communications professional, and CEO of Quantum Communications, a Harrisburg-based public relations and public affairs firm.
