= Joshua Plante =

American politician

Josh Plante

Member of the Maine House of Representatives for the 145th District
- In office December 2012 – December 2014
- Preceded by: Beth O'Connor
- Succeeded by: Beth O'Connor

Personal details
- Born: Berwick, Maine
- Party: Democrat
- Education: University of New Hampshire
- Profession: Licensed Loan Officer, Store Manager
- Website: JoshPlante.com

Joshua Plante is an American politician from Maine. Plante, a Democrat, represented District 145 in the Maine House of Representatives, which included Berwick and neighboring Lebanon. He earned a B.S. in Communications & Political Science from the University of New Hampshire in 2010. He is a lifelong resident of Berwick.

Plante served on the Criminal Justice and Public Safety Committee, and was appointed to serve on the State Council for Juvenile Supervision.
