= Seth Berry =

American educator & politician (born 1968)

Member of the Maine House of Representatives from the 55th district
- Incumbent
- Assumed office December 2016
- Preceded by: Brian Hobart
- In office December 6, 2006 – December 2014
- Preceded by: Deborah Hutton
- Succeeded by: Brian Hobart

Personal details
- Born: November 1, 1968 (age 57) Bowdoinham, Maine, U.S.
- Party: Democratic
- Education: Brown University; Columbia University
- Profession: Educator; Politician
- Website: Personal website House website

Seth Allan Berry (born November 1, 1968) is an American business, education and policy leader from the state of Maine. Berry ran 7 times from 2006 to 2020 for a seat in the Maine House of Representatives and was elected each time, representing Bowdoin, Bowdoinham, Richmond, and Swan Island, an historic wildlife preserve in the Kennebec River. In the Legislature, Berry was elected by his peers to serve as Majority Whip and later as Majority Leader, and served as chair of the committee on Energy, Utilities and Technology, chair of the Joint Select Committee on Maine's Workforce and Economic Future (2015-2016), and as lead Democrat on the committee overseeing tax policy.

== Early life and career ==
Berry was born in Bowdoinham, Maine, in 1968. He attended high school at Phillips Academy in Andover, Massachusetts, during which time he interned in the Washington, D.C., congressional office for Maine's District 1 representative, John R. McKernan, Jr. Berry attended college at Brown University, graduating in 1991 with a Bachelor's Degree as well as a high-school-teacher certification. While at Brown, Berry worked closely with professors Theodore Sizer and Arnold L. Weinstein. From 1992 to 2000, Berry taught public school in New York City in East Harlem and Washington Heights. During that time, he also earned his Master's Degree in Curriculum and Teaching from the Teachers College of Columbia University.

From June 2002 to December 2006, Berry served as selectperson for the town of Bowdoinham. He used this position to monitor town spending, promote local economic growth, advocate for long-term planning of land use, and improve local public services. He was elected Chair by fellow board members in 2004.

== Maine House of Representatives ==
Berry was elected to the Maine House of Representatives in November 2006. He represents the 55th District, which includes the towns of Bowdoin, Bowdoinham, and Richmond, as well as the unorganized territory of Perkins Township.

As a legislator, Berry served on the Joint Standing Committee on Utilities and Energy in 2007 and 2008. He was then elected by his Democratic peers to serve as Majority Whip in 2009 and 2010. In 2010, Berry's party lost its majority and he also lost a bid to become Minority Leader. In 2011 and 2012, Berry then served as the lead Democrat on the Joint Standing Committees on Taxation, as well as the House Committee on Elections.

Berry also served on the Maine Children's Growth Council, the 2008 Governor's Pre-Emergency Task Force, and on numerous committees of the National Council on State Legislatures.

During his time in the Maine legislature, Berry has sponsored over two dozen successful measures. He has made sustainability a priority, passing legislation to control air pollution, oversee nuclear waste disposal, and better fund energy efficiency efforts for Maine homes and businesses. Berry also focused on fiscally responsible economic development, working to ensure government accountability in tax incentives and to redesign federal social security offsets. Berry's successful bills have included enhanced consumer protections in telecommunication rate-setting, a first-in-the-nation ban on insurance caps to protect the most vulnerable from medical bankruptcy; a first-in-the-nation bill to require extended producer responsibility for compact fluorescent lamps; increased notification requirements for pesticide spraying, increased home visitation to assist families of at-risk infants and others; and one of the nation's first bans on the designer drugs misleadingly referred to as "bath salts."

Berry's environmental leadership earned him this praise from the Maine Conservation Voters in 2009: "The perfect combined ... score of Representatives Pingree, Piotti and Berry demonstrates the priority they place as a leadership team on policies to protect Maine’s air, land and water, to reduce our exposure to dangerous chemicals and to build a clean energy future. Pingree and Berry each sponsored significant legislation to protect human health, promote energy efficiency and advance clean energy jobs."

== Personal life ==
Berry lives in Bowdoinham with his wife and their two sons. He is fluent in Spanish; and his hobbies include guitar, sailing, and farming.

Berry has been the recipient of several awards in his professional and political work, including New York City's Hexter Award for Excellence in Teaching, which he received in 1998. His student-centered classroom was featured in the 1999 edition of "New York City's Best Middle Schools," a guide for New York parents, highlighting his successes leading one of the only non-selective public schools listed that year. In addition, Berry received the 2007 Healthy Air Award from the Maine chapter of the American Lung Association, and the 2010 Prevention Award from the Maine Alliance to Prevent Substance Abuse.

Berry is a member of the Midcoast United Way Success by Six Council, the Midcoast Area ACCESS Health Board, the Merrymeeting Bay Business Association, and the National Caucus of Environmental Legislators.
