= Timothy Theriault =

American politician

Member of the Maine House of Representatives from the 79th district
- Incumbent
- Assumed office December 3, 2014
- Preceded by: Sharon Treat

Personal details
- Party: Republican

Timothy Theriault is an American politician. He serves as a Republican member for the 79th district of the Maine House of Representatives.

In 2014, Theriault was elected to represent the 79th district in the Maine House of Representatives. He succeeded Sharon Treat. Theriault assumed his office on December 3, 2014.
