= Erik Jorgensen (politician) =

American politician

Member of the Maine House of Representatives
- In office December 5, 2012 – December 2, 2020
- Constituency: 41st district

Personal details
- Party: Democratic
- Education: Bowdoin College (BA); Harvard Kennedy School (MPA)

Erik Jorgensen is an American politician from Maine. Jorgensen, a Democrat from Portland, Maine, served in the Maine House of Representatives from 2012 to 2020. After leaving the Maine House of Representatives, Jorgensen began working as senior director of government relations and communications for the Maine State Housing Authority.
