= Christopher Babbidge =

American politician

Member of the Maine House of Representatives from the 8th district
- In office December 3, 2014 – December 7, 2022
- Preceded by: Paul Bennett (R)
- Succeeded by: Daniel Sayre (D)

Personal details
- Born: Christopher Welton Babbidge; March 14, 1949 (age 77) Portland, Maine U.S.
- Party: Democratic
- Education: South Portland High School; University of Maine Portland; University of Maine Orono; University of Maine Portland-Gorham (BA)
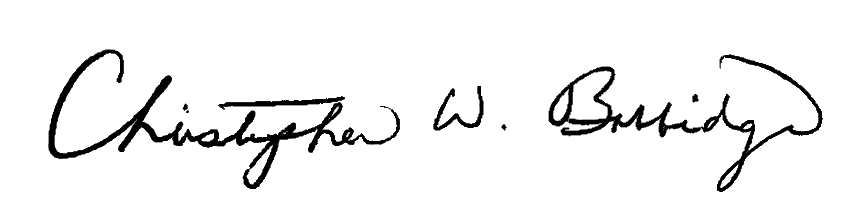
- Signature
- Website: Official website

Christopher Welton Babbidge (born March 14, 1949) is an American politician who served the 8th district in the Maine House of Representatives from 2014 to 2022.

An educator for four decades, he taught social studies at Greenville High School in the Moosehead region of Maine from 1973 to 1981. He continued to teach American history, government, and world cultures at Kennebunk High School near the coast of southern Maine from 1981 to 2012.

Babbidge was first elected to the Maine legislature in 2004, the first Democrat in 94 years to be elected from Kennebunk. At the time Kennebunk was 23% democratic. He represented Maine’s 141st District in the House of Representatives from 2004 to 2008, when despite being unopposed he announced he would not run for reelection.

Following the Republican wave of 2010, including the election of a Republican governor, Babbidge, a Democrat, returned to the legislature in 2014. He returned to advocate for gender equality, renewable energy, environmental protection, educational opportunity, and social justice. Having served on four legislative committees he concluded by serving three consecutive terms on the joint committee on judiciary. In accordance with Maine Statute, Rep. Babbidge was term-limited after four consecutive terms, ending in December 2022. Babbidge was elected at four state conventions to be a delegate from Maine to four Democratic National Conventions. Chicago in 1996, Los Angeles in 2000, Denver in 2008, and Philadelphia in 2016.
