= Richard Malaby =

Richard Steven Malaby (August 16, 1951 – February 11, 2025) was an American politician and innkeeper. He owned and operated the historic Crocker House Country Inn in Hancock Point, Maine from 1980 to 2021. A member of the Republican Party, he served in Maine House of Representatives from 2010 to 2018 as the representative of District 136.

== Life and career ==
Malaby attended Chaminade High School in Mineola, New York, and graduated from the University of Michigan. He received a master’s degree in Business Administration from Michigan State University. After completing his college education he moved to Washington D.C. where he worked in the restaurant industry. In 1980 he relocated to Hancock Point, Maine when he purchased the Crocker House Country Inn from artist Bill Moise; a business he owned and operated until 2021.

In 1984 Malaby married Elizabeth Holdsworth. They raised three children together. He served for fifteen years on the school board of Hancock Public Schools, and served on the board of Maine Coast Memorial Hospital (now Northern Light Maine Coast Hospital) for nine years. A Republican Party politician, he served as the representative of District 136 in the Maine House of Representatives from 2010 through 2018.

He died on February 11, 2025.
