= Paul Chace =

Paul Chace is an American politician from Maine in the Republican Party. He earned a BS from the University of Rhode Island. He served two terms representing the 46th district in the Maine House of Representatives from 2014 to 2018.
