= Karen Gerrish =

American politician

Member of the Maine House of Representatives from the 20th district district
- In office December, 2014 – December, 2018
- Preceded by: David Johnson
- Succeeded by: Theodore Kryzak

Personal details
- Party: Republican
- Education: Noble High School, University of New England,University of Southern Maine

Karen Gerrish is an American politician, and teacher from Lebanon, Maine.

== Political career ==
Gerrish served in the Maine House of Representatives. She represented Maine's 20th district for two terms, from 2014 to 2018.

== Electoral History ==
General election for Maine House of Representatives District 20, 2016
Party	Candidate	Votes	%
Republican	Karen Gerrish	3,365	68.26%
Democratic	Daniel Lauzon	1,565	31.74%

General election for Maine House of Representatives District 20, 2014
Party	Candidate	Votes	%
Republican	Karen Gerrish	2,070	56.4%
Democratic	Bettie Harris-Howard	1,336	36.4%
None	None	186	5.1%
None	Other	75	2%

Republican Primary election for Maine House of Representatives District 20, 2014
Party	Candidate	Votes	%
Republican	Karen Gerrish	310	60%
Republican	Harrison Thorp	207	40%
