= Brian Hubbell =

American politician

Member of the Maine House of Representatives from the 135th district
- In office 2012–2020
- Succeeded by: Lynne Williams

Personal details
- Party: Democratic
- Website: RepHubbell.com

Brian Hubbell is an American politician who was a member of the Maine House of Representatives from 2012 to 2020. He represented the 135th House District (Bar Harbor, Lamoine and Mount Desert) as a member of the Democratic Party. He was a member of the Joint Standing Committee on Appropriations and Financial Affairs from 2016 through 2020 and a member of the Joint Standing Committee on Education and Cultural Affairs from 2012 through 2016. He was ineligible for reelection in 2020 because of Maine state constitutional term limits.

Hubbell currently serves as a senior policy advisor in Governor Janet Mills' Office of Policy Innovation and the Future.

== Energy and Climate Policy ==
Hubbell wrote legislation which directs Maine to plan to triple its capacity for in-state renewable energy generation by 2030 in order to match the full value of the state's total projected energy needs for electrical power, transportation, and heating.

Hubbell served on the Scientific and Technical Subcommittee of the Maine Climate Council which is charged with developing a plan for Maine to reduce its greenhouse gas emissions to less than 45% of 1990 levels by 2030 and to at least 80% below 1990 levels by 2050.

In 2003 and 2004, Hubbell served on the stakeholder advisory group for Maine's Greenhouse Gas Initiative which, through Maine's 2004 Climate Action Plan led to the establishment in 2009 of the Northeastern US Regional Greenhouse Gas Initiative.

Hubbell earned a degree in Architecture from the Massachusetts Institute of Technology (MIT) where he did research on solar energy.

At MIT, he designed and built MIT’s fifth and sixth solar demonstration buildings which were the first applications of low-emissivity (low-E) glazing and phase change materials for isothermal heat storage.

== Education Policy ==
Hubbell served on the Bar Harbor school board from 2004 through 2014. He led an effort to shield schools from an unpopular 2007 state consolidation initiative, ultimately obtaining an expansion of the consolidation law to allow Maine school districts the choice of an alternative governance structure modeled after Mount Desert Island's schools. In 2009, Hubbell served as the first chair of the reorganized Mount Desert Island Regional School System which administers schools in the towns of Bar Harbor, Mount Desert, Southwest Harbor, Tremont, Cranberry Isles, Frenchboro, and Trenton.

In the legislature, Hubbell was a leader on education policy and school funding, serving on the legislature's Education Committee for two terms from 2012 to 2016 and, beginning in 2017, serving on the Appropriations Committee.

In 2014 Hubbell chaired the Maine legislature's commission to study adequacy and equity in school funding.

Originally an opponent of charter schools, in 2015 Hubbell sponsored a bill that ensured that charter schools approved by the state charter school commission are fully funded by the state rather than by local school districts.

Also in 2015, Hubbell negotiated a compromise which gave public school teachers greater voice in designing their professional evaluations while keeping Maine in compliance with federal requirements.

In 2015 and 2016, Hubbell led the action on several bills which direct transcript-based credentials for student learning and require that schools offer alternate pathways to proficiency in more rigorous high school graduation standards.

In 2017, as part of the state's biennial budget package which added $162 million in state aid to local schools, Hubbell negotiated accompanying substantive changes in education funding policy which increased funding allocation to economically disadvantaged students and incentives for regional school collaboration.

== Economic and other political positions ==
In 2020 during the COVID-19 pandemic, Hubbell was appointed to serve on Governor Janet Mills' Economic Recovery Committee charged with planning the rebuilding of Maine's economy.

In addition to his sponsorship of bills focused on education, Hubbell has co-sponsored numerous bonds supporting expanded capacity for scientific research and development in Maine. Hubbell serves on the Maine Economic Growth Council of the Maine Development Foundation. In 2017, Hubbell co-sponsored a bill to reverse scheduled increases in the tipped minimum wage; the minimum wage increase was passed via a citizen's initiative in November 2016.

In 2016, following a series of racially charged remarks from Governor LePage, Hubbell called for LePage's resignation.

== Personal ==
In 2021, Hubbell was nominated by Governor Janet Mills and confirmed by the Maine legislature to serve on the board of the Maine State Housing Authority.

Hubbell is a self-employed construction project manager, with experience primarily in public and commercial buildings, augmented by passive solar residential designs.

From 1998 through 2008, Hubbell served on the editorial board of the Beloit Poetry Journal. He is the author of a novel, Seeing Lily.

He is the son of writer Sue Hubbell and is married to the artist Liddy Hubbell.
