= Patrick Corey =

American politician

Patrick Corey is an American Republican politician and state legislator from Maine. Corey represents Maine House District 25, comprising part of the town of Windham, Maine. During his fourth term from 2020–2022, Corey served on the Committee on Appropriations and Financial Affairs and the Committee on Veterans and Legal Affairs.

== Personal life ==
After graduating from the University of Southern Maine in 1997, Corey worked as a graphic designer. He is now self-employed as a creative director.

== Political career ==
After winning an uncontested primary election, Corey was first elected to the Maine House in 2014. He defeated Democrat Jennie Butler 56.2%–43.8%.

Maine House of Representatives
Preceded by Kenneth Fredette	Member of the Maine House of Representatives from the 25th district 2014–2022	Succeeded by Laurie Osher
