= Heidi Brooks =

American politician and former physician

Member of the Maine House of Representatives
- In office December 3, 2014 – December 7, 2022

Personal details
- Party: Democrat
- Education: Boston College (Bachelor's Degree); New York Medical College (MD)
- Profession: Former physician

Heidi Brooks is an American politician and former physician who represented part of Lewiston in the Maine House of Representatives. First elected in 2014, Brooks served on the Insurance and Financial Services Committee, later becoming the Health Coverage, Insurance and Financial Services Committee. She served four two year terms.

== Background ==
A native of the Lewiston-Auburn area, Brooks graduated in the top 10 of the Edward Little High School Class of 1988. She earned a bachelor's degree from Boston College in 1992 and a medical degree from New York Medical College in 1996. She was active as an advocate and volunteer prior to running for the legislature.

== Political career ==
After years of local political involvement, Brooks ran for the Maine House of Representatives in 2014. She was unopposed in the Democratic primary, and faced then-independent Mark Cayer in the general election.

As a legislator, Brooks has pushed for single-payer health care in Maine.

Brooks served as the secretary of the Maine Democratic Party until 2018.
