= Gina Melaragno =

American politician

Member of the Maine House of Representatives from the 62nd district
- Incumbent
- Assumed office December 3, 2014
- Preceded by: Jennifer DeChant

Personal details
- Party: Democratic
- Education: University of Southern Maine (AA)

Gina M. Melaragno is an American politician serving as a member of the Maine House of Representatives from the 62nd district. Elected in November 2014, she assumed office on December 3, 2014.

== Early life and education ==
Melaragno was raised in Auburn, Maine and graduated from Edward Little High School. She earned an associate degree in liberal arts from the University of Southern Maine.

== Career ==
Outside of politics, Melaragno has worked as a customer service representative and in the healthcare industry. She was elected to the Maine House of Representatives in November 2014 and assumed office on December 3, 2014.
