= Diane Denk =

American politician

Member of the Maine House of Representatives from the 9th district
- In office December, 2018 – December, 2020
- Preceded by: H. Stedman Seavey
- Succeeded by: Traci Gere

Personal details
- Party: Democratic
- Education: National Louis University, Loyola University Chicago

Diane Denk is an American politician, and special education teacher from Springfield, Illinois. She served in the Maine House of Representatives from 2018 to 2020 representing the 9th district.

== Electoral History ==
General election for Maine House of Representatives District 9, 2018
Party	Candidate	Votes	%
Democratic	Diane Denk	2,857	59%
Republican	Roger Seavey	1,984	41%
None	Blank Votes	134	3.3%

General election for Maine House of Representatives District 9, 2016
Party	Candidate	Votes	%
Republican	Stedman Seavey	2,769	50.49%
Democratic	Diane Denk	2,715	49.51%

General election for Maine House of Representatives District 9, 2014
Party	Candidate	Votes	%
Republican	Stedman Seavey	2,254	49.9%
Democratic	Diane Denk	2,108	46.6%
None	Blank Votes	157	3.5%
