= Michael Shaw (Maine politician) =

American politician

Member of the Maine House of Representatives for the 102nd District
- In office December 2008 – August 21, 2015
- Succeeded by: Stacey Guerin

Personal details
- Party: Democrat
- Education: Southern Maine Community College
- Profession: Rail conductor
- Website: Official site

Michael A. Shaw is an American politician from Maine. A Democrat, Shaw was a member of the Maine House of Representatives from November 2008 to August 2015. He was re-elected in 2010, 2012 and 2014. Following his 2012 re-election, Shaw was appointed Chair of the Inland Fisheries & Wildlife Committee. Shaw resigned in August 2015 after his employer relocated to Freeport.

Shaw attended Southern Maine Community College.
