= Victoria Kornfield =

American teacher and politician

Victoria P. Kornfield is an American schoolteacher and politician from Maine. A Democrat from Bangor, Kornfield represented District 125 of the Maine House of Representatives, which encompassed part of Bangor of Penobscot County. First elected in 2012, Kornfield was re-elected in 2014, 2016, and 2018. She lost a tightly contested primary for the Bangor-area Maine Senate district in July 2018 to Joe Baldacci.

Kornfield worked as an English teacher in the Bangor School Department.
