= Jim Handy =

American politician

James R. Handy is an American politician from Maine. He has represented part of the city of Lewiston in the Maine House of Representatives since 2016. Handy previously served in the Maine House from 1982 to 1992, and in the Maine Senate from 1992 to 1994. Handy returned to service in the Maine House of Representatives in 2018 to 2020. He sponsored legislation to require health insurance policies to provide coverage for hearing aids. He also sponsored the bill the establish the Maine Bicentennial Commission. He is a member of the Democratic Party.

During Handy's tenure in Maine politics he has served chairperson for the Joint Standing Committee on Labor, Aging Retirement and Veterans; and, Utilities; and Chairperson of the Blue Ribbon Commission on Early Childhood Education, and a member of the Special Commission on Women in School Administration. He served on the Lewiston School Committee from 1999 to 2016, including many years as the chair.

Handy earned a bachelor's degree from the University of Southern Maine in Political Science and graduated cum laude in 1980.

Since leaving the legislature, Handy has been employed by Lewiston Public Schools. He is a retired Educational Technician serving special education students. In August 2022, Governor Janet T. Mills appointed Handy to serve on the Maine Charter School Commission (https://www.maine.gov/csc/home).
