= Beth O'Connor =

American politician and activist

Member of the Maine House of Representatives
- In office December 3, 2014 – December 7, 2022
- Preceded by: Joshua Plante
- Succeeded by: Joseph F. Underwood
- Constituency: 5th district
- In office December 1, 2010 – December 5, 2012
- Preceded by: Thomas Wright
- Succeeded by: Joshua Plante
- Constituency: 145th district

Personal details
- Party: Republican

Beth O'Connor is an American politician and activist from Maine. O'Connor, a Republican from Berwick, Maine, has served in the Maine House of Representatives since December 2014. She also served a single term from 2011 to 2012.

O'Connor has also served as chairwoman of Maine Taxpayers United.

O'Connor served for seven months as vice-chairwoman of the Maine Republican Party. She resigned on June 28, 2013, citing Republican legislators lack of support for Republican Governor Paul LePage's biennial budget.
