= Dustin White =

American politician

Member of the Maine House of Representatives from the 146th district
- In office December 3, 2014 – December 7, 2022
- Preceded by: Mark Eves
- Succeeded by: Walter Runte

Personal details
- Born: Dustin Michael White
- Party: Republican

Dustin Michael White is an American politician serving as a member of the Maine House of Representatives from the 146th district. He assumed office on December 3, 2014.

== Background ==
White lives in Mars Hill, Maine. He studied pre-law at Husson University and Risk Management & Insurance at the University of Southern Maine. Outside of politics, White works as a Regulatory Affairs & Compliance Specialist. He was elected to the Maine House of Representatives in November 2014 and assumed office on December 3, 2014. White served on the Environment and Natural Resources, Veteran and Legal Affairs, and Transportation committee's. He also served as the ranking member of the House Elections Committee.
