= Sara Gideon =

American politician (born 1971)

102nd Speaker of the Maine House of Representatives
- In office December 7, 2016 – December 2, 2020
- Preceded by: Mark Eves
- Succeeded by: Ryan Fecteau

Member of the Maine House of Representatives from the 48th district
- In office December 5, 2012 – December 2, 2020
- Preceded by: Charles Kruger
- Succeeded by: Melanie Sachs

Personal details
- Born: Sara Isher Gideon; December 4, 1971 (age 54) Warwick, Rhode Island, U.S.
- Party: Democratic
- Spouse: Benjamin Rogoff (m. 2001)
- Children: 3
- Education: George Washington University (BA)
- Website: Campaign website

Sara Isher Gideon (born December 4, 1971) is an American politician who served as the Speaker of the Maine House of Representatives. A member of the Democratic Party from Freeport, she represented the 48th district in the Maine House of Representatives, which includes part of Freeport and Pownal in Cumberland County.

Gideon was the Democratic nominee for the 2020 U.S. Senate election in Maine, losing to incumbent Republican Susan Collins.

== Early life and education ==
Gideon was born and raised in Rhode Island. Her father, a pediatrician, is from India and her mother, a nurse clinician, is a second-generation Armenian American. Gideon was raised Christian.

Gideon is the youngest of four siblings, one of whom, Melanie, is a novelist. She graduated from East Greenwich High School in East Greenwich, Rhode Island, in 1989. In 1994, she earned a Bachelor of Arts in international affairs from George Washington University's Elliott School of International Affairs in Washington, D.C.

== Career ==
=== Early career ===
She served as an intern for U.S. Senator Claiborne Pell. She also worked as an advertising account executive at USA Today.

In 2004, Gideon moved to Freeport, Maine. In October 2009, she won a seat on the Freeport Town Council. She served until 2012, and was the council's vice chair beginning in 2011.

=== Maine House of Representatives ===
First elected to the Maine House of Representatives in 2012, Gideon was reelected in 2014 and chosen as Assistant Majority Leader. In 2016, she was elected as Speaker by the House. As speaker, Gideon also supported Medicaid expansion in Maine, including the 2017 referendum on the topic, and helped override Governor Paul LePage's veto of a bill to make the anti-overdose drug naloxone (Narcan) available over-the-counter, aimed at preventing deaths from the opioid epidemic.

Gideon was a member of the Legislature's Joint Standing Committee on Energy, Utilities and Technology. According to India Abroad, "she worked to lower energy costs, encourage increased energy efficiency and promote clean and renewable energy to capitalize on Maine's natural resources and build a clean-energy economy."

After Democratic Governor Janet Mills was elected in 2018, the Maine Legislature under Gideon's speakership passed several key climate change bills, including a measure requiring Maine to achieve 80 percent renewable energy by 2030 and 100 percent by 2050. As speaker in 2019 and 2020, Gideon also sponsored legislation to expand abortion access by allowing physician assistants and advanced practice registered nurses to perform the procedure. She sponsored legislation to block the Quebec power company Hydro-Québec from spending money to influence a referendum of a controversial proposed power line project in Maine.

In 2019, Gideon faced an election ethics complaint for accepting reimbursements for her personal political donations from her own PAC. A spokesperson said, "The contributions were within the legal limit and fully disclosed, but the committee was given incorrect guidance on how to process them." The campaign said that it had reimbursed the federal government $3,250 for the violations and closed the PAC. In October 2019, the Maine Ethics Commission voted unanimously to fine the closed PAC $500.

=== 2020 U.S. Senate campaign ===
On June 24, 2019, Gideon announced her candidacy in the 2020 Senate election to challenge incumbent Republican Susan Collins. In the first week of her campaign, she raised more than $1 million. Gideon ran against Betsy Sweet and Bre Kidman in the ranked-choice Democratic primary election. In the primary, Gideon received support from the mainstream of the Democratic Party, while Sweet and Kidman drew support from the party's insurgent progressive wing. Before the July 14 primary, Gideon was endorsed by the Democratic Senatorial Campaign Committee as well as labor unions and women's groups. Gideon led in primary election polling, and won the primary with roughly 70% of the vote. By the time of the primary election, she had raised $23 million. The Bangor Daily News endorsed Gideon in the Democratic primary in June 2020.

Following her Democratic primary win in June, Gideon received endorsements from NARAL, EMILY's List, Progressive Democrats of America, Brand New Congress, and Our Revolution. In August, former President Barack Obama endorsed Gideon. In 2020, the Human Rights Campaign (HRC), the country's largest LGBTQ rights advocacy organization, opposed the reelection of Susan Collins and instead endorsed Gideon. It was the first time that the HRC has opposed Collins, who has been seen as a key Republican vote on LGBTQ rights.

The hotly contested race became the most expensive in Maine history, with Collins spending $23 million and Gideon nearly $48 million. The race also had national implications, as defeating Collins was a key part of the Democrats' strategy to achieve a Senate majority.

Gideon ultimately lost the election by over 8% to Collins. Gideon was defeated despite leading Collins in nearly every public poll.

Gideon underperformed winning Democratic presidential candidate Joe Biden by 10.6%. Her performance was the second-worst underperformance by a Democratic Senate candidate in the country.

== Political positions ==
Gideon said that affordable drugs and health care were her primary campaign issues. She supports the Affordable Care Act ("Obamacare"). She also supports a public health insurance option, which would allow Americans to buy into Medicare while also retaining a private health insurance market. She supports allowing Medicare to negotiate lower prices for prescription drugs, and a prohibition on pharmaceutical company "pay to delay" agreements.

In the state House, Gideon sponsored legislation to expand abortion access and extend benefits to families in poverty. She states she will fight any attempts to attack or defund Planned Parenthood; will work to roll back the Title X gag rule, which has impacted Maine Family Planning and Planned Parenthood clinics. Gideon has been endorsed by Planned Parenthood Action Fund and NARAL. Gideon opposed the Trump tax bill. Gideon supports the U.S. rejoining the Paris Agreement to combat climate change; the U.S. entered the agreement under Barack Obama, but withdrew under Donald Trump. She supports government funding for the development of renewable energy (e.g. solar, wind, geo-thermal) and the federal regulation of greenhouse gas emissions. Gideon supports universal background checks and red flag laws, and has expressed support for high-capacity magazine restrictions. Gideon supports various police reforms, including a police misconduct registry and requirements for the use of body cameras and vehicle cameras.

== Personal life ==
Gideon married attorney Benjamin Rogoff in November 2001. According to her sister Melanie, Gideon agreed to convert to Judaism as part of an agreement in which Rogoff took the Gideon surname. Benjamin Gideon is a medical malpractice and personal injury attorney at Gideon Asen LLC.

== Electoral history ==
=== 2012 ===
Maine House of Representatives District 106, 2012 Democratic Primary
Party	Candidate	Votes	%
Democratic	Sara Gideon	534	50.47%
Democratic	Melanie F. Sachs	470	44.30%
Democratic	Patrick T. Norton	46	4.34%
Blank		11	1.04%
Total votes		1,061	100%

Maine House of Representatives District 106, 2012 General Election
Party	Candidate	Votes	%
Democratic	Sara Gideon	3,525	62.85%
Republican	Jody James	1,837	32.75%
Blank		247	4.40%
Total votes		5,609	100%
Democratic hold			

=== 2014 ===
Maine House of Representatives District 48, 2014 General Election
Party	Candidate	Votes	%
Democratic	Sara Gideon (incumbent)	3,226	63.93%
Republican	Paul Schulz	1,589	31.49%
Blank		231	4.58%
Total votes		5,046	100%
Democratic hold			

=== 2016 ===
Maine House of Representatives District 48, 2016 General Election
Party	Candidate	Votes	%
Democratic	Sara Gideon (incumbent)	3,994	66.08%
Republican	Paul Schulz	1,589	30.46%
Blank		209	3.46%
Total votes		6,044	100%
Democratic hold			

=== 2018 ===
Maine House of Representatives District 48, 2018 General Election
Party	Candidate	Votes	%
Democratic	Sara Gideon (incumbent)	4,003	71.85%
Republican	Paul Schulz	1,440	25.85%
Blank		128	2.30%
Total votes		5,571	100%
Democratic hold			

=== 2020 ===
2020 United States Senate election in Maine, Democratic Primary
Party	Candidate	Votes	%
Democratic	Sara Gideon	116,264	71.5
Democratic	Betsy Sweet	37,327	22.9
Democratic	Bre Kidman	9,090	5.6
Total votes		162,681	100.0%

2020 United States Senate election in Maine, General Election
Party	Candidate	Votes	%
Republican	Susan Collins (incumbent)	417,645	50.98%
Democratic	Sara Gideon	347,223	42.39%
Independent	Lisa Savage	40,579	4.95%
Independent	Max Linn	13,508	1.65%
Write-in		228	0.03%
Total votes		819,183	100.0%
Republican hold			

== See also ==
- List of female speakers of legislatures in the United States

Political offices
Preceded by Mark Eves	Speaker of the Maine House of Representatives; 2016–2020	Succeeded by Ryan Fecteau
Party political offices
Preceded by Shenna Bellows	Democratic nominee for U.S. Senator from Maine (Class 2); 2020	Succeeded by Graham Platner; Withdrew
