= Walter Riseman =

American politician

Member of the Maine House of Representatives from the 83rd district
- Incumbent
- Assumed office December 7, 2022
- Preceded by: Thomas Harnett

Personal details
- Born: Norwood, Massachusetts
- Party: Independent
- Education: Babson College

Walter Riseman is an American politician who has served as a member of the Maine House of Representatives since December 7, 2022. He represents Maine's 83rd House district.

He did not seek re-election in 2024, choosing to retire instead.
