= Everett McLeod =

American politician

Everett McLeod Sr. (died December 20, 2010) was an American politician from Maine. McLeod, a Republican, was a member of the Maine House of Representatives for District 11 which included parts of Hancock, Washington and Penobscot Counties from 2004 to 2010. In his final term, outgoing Democratic Governor John Baldacci, who had known McLeod for 15 years, traveled to McLeod's home in Lee to swear him in due to illness.

He served as a trustee/director at Lee Academy.
