= Theodore Kryzak =

American politician (died 2022)

Member of the Maine House of Representatives from the 20th district
- In office December 5, 2018 – March 26, 2022
- Preceded by: Karen Gerrish
- Succeeded by: Kevin O'Connell

Personal details
- Died: March 26, 2022 (aged 66)
- Party: Republican
- Children: 4

Theodore Kryzak (died March 26, 2022) was an American politician. He served as a Republican member for the 20th district of the Maine House of Representatives.

In 2018, Kryzak won the election for the 20th district of the Maine House of Representatives. He succeeded Karen Gerrish. Kryzak died in March 2022 during serving his office which was the 20th district, at the age of 66.
