= Deborah Sanderson =

American politician

Member of the Maine House of Representatives from the 88th district
- In office December 3, 2014 – December 5, 2018
- Preceded by: Larry Dunphy
- Succeeded by: Chloe Maxmin

Member of the Maine House of Representatives from the 52nd district
- In office December 1, 2010 – December 3, 2014
- Preceded by: Elizabeth Miller
- Succeeded by: Jennifer DeChant

Personal details
- Party: Republican

Deborah Sanderson is an American politician who has served in the Maine House of Representatives from 2010 to 2018. She is from Chelsea, Maine.
