= Donna Doore =

American politician

Donna Doore (1952 – January 31, 2022) was an American politician from the Maine Democratic Party. She represented District 85 in the Maine House of Representatives from 2014 until her death.

Doore previously served as a member of the Augusta City Council. Doore died cancer in January 2022.
