= Jennifer Parker (politician) =

American politician

Member of the Maine House of Representatives from the 6th district
- In office 2016 – December 4, 2018
- Succeeded by: Tiffany Roberts-Lovell

Personal details
- Party: Democratic

Jennifer Ellen Parker is an American politician from Maine. She is a former Democratic member of the Maine House of Representatives.
