= Richard Farnsworth (politician) =

American politician

Member of the Maine House of Representatives from the 37th district
- In office December 5, 2012 – December 2, 2020
- Preceded by: Anne Haskell
- Succeeded by: Grayson Lookner

Member of the Maine House of Representatives from the 32nd district
- In office December 1996 – December 1998
- Preceded by: Fred Richardson
- Succeeded by: John McDonough

Personal details
- Party: Democratic
- Education: Ohio State University, Boston University, Temple University

Richard "Dick" Farnsworth is an American politician from Maine. Farnsworth, a Democrat, served in the Maine House of Representatives from 1996 to 1998 for District 32, then part of Portland. He chose not to seek re-election in 1998. In 2012, Farnsworth again sought election to the Maine House of Representatives, this time from the renamed District 117, also part of Portland. He won and was sworn in for a second time in December 2012.

Farnsworth earned a B.S. in education from Ohio State University, a Master's in Divinity from Boston University and an Ed.D. from Temple University.
