= Gay Grant =

American politician

Gay Grant is an American politician from Gardiner, Maine. She attended the University of Southern Maine and graduated with a bachelor's degree in history. Grant represented Maine's 83rd state house district from 2012 to 2018.

== Electoral History ==
General election for Maine House of Representatives District 83, 2016
Party	Candidate	Votes	%
Democratic	Gay Grant	2,715	58.12%
Republican	Scott Williams	1,956	41.88%

General election for Maine House of Representatives District 83, 2014
Party	Candidate	Votes	%
Democratic	Gay Grant	2,233	53.5%
Republican	Curtis Ayotte	1,804	43.2%
None	Blank Votes	138	3.3%

General election for Maine House of Representatives District 59, 2012
Party	Candidate	Votes	%
Democratic	Gay Grant	2,095	54.7%
Republican	Shirley Hanley	1,736	45.3%

Democratic Primary election for Maine House of Representatives District 59, 2012
Party	Candidate	Votes	%
Democratic	Gay Grant	283	44.8%
Democratic	Harvey DeVane	187	29.6%
Democratic	Phillip Barter	161	25.5%
