= Kim Monaghan-Derrig =

American politician

Kimberly J. Monaghan

Member of the Maine House of Representatives (District 121)
- In office August 16, 2011 – December 3, 2014
- Preceded by: Cynthia Dill
- Succeeded by: Redistricted

Member of the Maine House of Representatives (District 30)
- In office December 3, 2014 – December 5, 2018
- Preceded by: Redistricted
- Succeeded by: Anne Carney

Personal details
- Party: Democratic
- Education: University of Southern Maine

Kimberly J. Monaghan is an American politician from Maine. Monaghan, a Democrat from Cape Elizabeth, Maine, served in the Maine House of Representatives from August 2011, when she won a special election to finish the term begun by fellow Democrat Cynthia Dill. She served until December 2018, when she was term limited.

Before her election, Monaghan was a member of the Cape Elizabeth School Board. She was born and raised in Cape Elizabeth.
