= 2020 Maine House of Representatives election =

- November 3, 2020

All 151 seats in the Maine House of Representatives 76 seats needed for a majority
- Registered: 1,138,801 (▲7.61 pp)
- Turnout: 72.73% (▲11.50 pp)
	Majority party	Minority party	Third party
Leader	Sara Gideon (term-limited)	Kathleen Dillingham	None
Party	Democratic	Republican	Independent
Leader's seat	48th	72nd	None
Last election	89	56	6
Seats won	80	67	4
Seat change	▼9	▲11	▼2
Popular vote	384,500	332,087	25,049
Percentage	51.54%	44.51%	3.36%
- Results: Republican hold Republican gain Democratic hold Democratic gain Independent hold
Speaker before election
Sara Gideon
Democratic
Elected Speaker
Ryan Fecteau
Democratic

The 2020 Maine House of Representatives elections took place on November 3, 2020, alongside the biennial United States elections. Maine voters elected members of the Maine House of Representatives via plurality voting in all 151 of the state house's districts, as well as a non-voting member from the Passamaquoddy Tribe.

The election was also held alongside elections for the Maine Senate.

State representatives serve two-year terms in the Maine State House.

== Predictions ==
Source	Ranking	As of
The Cook Political Report	Likely D	October 21, 2020

== Results ==
Italics denote an open seat held by the incumbent party, bold text denotes a gain for a party.

State House District	Incumbent	Party	Elected Representative	Party
1st	Deane Rykerson	Dem	Kristi Mathieson	Dem
2nd	Michele Meyer	Dem	Michele Meyer	Dem
3rd	Lydia Blume	Dem	Lydia Blume	Dem
4th	Patricia Hymanson	Dem	Patricia Hymanson	Dem
5th	Beth O'Connor	Rep	Beth O'Connor	Rep
6th	Tiffany Roberts-Lovell	Dem	Tiffany Roberts-Lovell	Dem
7th	Daniel Hobbs	Dem	**Timothy Roche**	**Rep**
8th	Christopher Babbidge	Dem	Christopher Babbidge	Dem
9th	Diane Denk	Dem	Traci Gere	Dem
10th	Henry Ingwersen	Dem	**Wayne Parry**	**Rep**
11th	Ryan Fecteau	Dem	Ryan Fecteau	Dem
12th	Victoria Foley	Ind	**Erin Sheehan**	**Dem**
13th	Lori Gramlich	Dem	Lori Gramlich	Dem
14th	Donna Bailey	Dem	Lynn Copeland	Dem
15th	Margaret M. O'Neil	Dem	Margaret M. O'Neil	Dem
16th	Donald G. Marean	Rep	Nathan Carlow	Rep
17th	Dwayne W. Prescott	Rep	Dwayne W. Prescott	Rep
18th	Anne-Marie Mastraccio	Dem	John Tuttle	Dem
19th	Matthew Harrington	Rep	Matthew Harrington	Rep
20th	Theodore Kryzak	Rep	Theodore Kryzak	Rep
21st	Heidi H. Sampson	Rep	Heidi H. Sampson	Rep
22nd	Mark Blier	Rep	Mark Blier	Rep
23rd	Lester Ordway	Rep	Lester Ordway	Rep
24th	Mark Bryant	Dem	Mark Bryant	Dem
25th	Patrick Corey	Rep	Patrick Corey	Rep
26th	Maureen Fitzgerald Terry	Dem	Maureen Fitzgerald Terry	Dem
27th	Andrew McLean	Dem	Kyle Bailey	Dem
28th	Chrostopher Caiazzo	Dem	Christopher Caiazzo	Dem
29th	Shawn Babine	Dem	**Sophia Warren**	**Ind**
30th	Anne Carney	Dem	Rebecca Millett	Dem
31st	Lois Galgay Reckitt	Dem	Lois Galgay Reckitt	Dem
32nd	Christopher Kessler	Dem	Christopher Kessler	Dem
33rd	Victoria Morales	Dem	Victoria Morales	Dem
34th	Andrew Gattine	Dem	Morgan Rielly	Dem
35th	Vacant		Suzanne Salisbury	Dem
36th	Michael Brennan	Dem	Michael Brennan	Dem
37th	Richard Farnsworth	Dem	Grayson Lookner	Dem
38th	Matthew Moonen	Dem	Barbara Wood	Dem
39th	Michael A. Sylvester	Dem	Michael A. Sylvester	Dem
40th	Rachel Talbot Ross	Dem	Rachel Talbot Ross	Dem
41st	Erik Jorgensen	Dem	Samuel Zager	Dem
42nd	Benjamin Collings	Dem	Benjamin Collings	Dem
43rd	W. Edward Crockett	Dem	W. Edward Crockett	Dem
44th	Teresa Pierce	Dem	Teresa Pierce	Dem
45th	Dale J. Denno	Dem	Stephen Moriarty	Dem
46th	Braden Sharpe	Dem	Braden Sharpe	Dem
47th	Janice Cooper	Dem	Arthur Bell	Dem
48th	Sara Gideon	Dem	Melanie Sachs	Dem
49th	Mattie Daughtry	Dem	Poppy Arford	Dem
50th	Ralph Tucker	Dem	Ralph Tucker	Dem
51st	Joyce McCreight	Dem	Joyce McCreight	Dem
52nd	Jennifer DeChant	Dem	Sean Paulhus	Dem
53rd	Allison Hepler	Dem	Allison Hepler	Dem
54th	Denise Tepler	Dem	Denise Tepler	Dem
55th	Seth Berry	Dem	Seth Berry	Dem
56th	Rick Mason	Rep	Rick Mason	Rep
57th	Thomas Martin	Rep	Thomas Martin	Rep
58th	James R. Handy	Dem	**Jonathan Connor**	**Rep**
59th	Margaret Craven	Dem	Margaret Craven	Dem
60th	Kristen Cloutier	Dem	Kristen Cloutier	Dem
61st	Heidi Brooks	Dem	Heidi Brooks	Dem
62nd	Gina Melaragno	Dem	Gina Melaragno	Dem
63rd	Bruce Bickford	Rep	Bruce Bickford	Rep
64th	Bettyann Sheats	Dem	**Laurel Libby**	**Rep**
65th	Amy Arata	Rep	Amy Arata	Rep
66th	Jessica L. Fay	Dem	Jessica L. Fay	Dem
67th	Susan Austin	Rep	Susan Austin	Rep
68th	Richard Cebra	Rep	Richard Cebra	Rep
69th	Walter Riseman	Ind	Walter Riseman	Ind
70th	Nathan Wadsworth	Rep	Nathan Wadsworth	Rep
71st	H. Sawin Millett	Rep	H. Sawin Millett	Rep
72nd	Kathleen Dillingham	Rep	Kathleen Dillingham	Rep
73rd	John Andrews	Rep	John Andrews	Rep
74th	Christina Riley	Dem	**Sheila Lyman**	**Rep**
75th	Joshua Morris	Rep	Joshua Morris	Rep
76th	Dennis Keschl	Rep	Daniel Newman	Rep
77th	Michael D. Perkins	Rep	Michael D. Perkins	Rep
78th	Catherine Nadeau	Dem	**Cathy Nadeau** (Note: Not to be confused with Catherine Nadeau, D-Winslow, who was the term-limited incumbent previously in this seat.)	**Rep**
79th	Timothy Theriault	Rep	Timothy Theriault	Rep
80th	Richard T. Bradstreet	Rep	Richard T. Bradstreet	Rep
81st	Craig Hickman	Dem	Tavis Hasenfus	Dem
82nd	Kent Ackley	Ind	**Randall Greenwood**	**Rep**
83rd	Thomas Harnett	Dem	Thomas Harnett	Dem
84th	Charlotte Warren	Dem	Charlotte Warren	Dem
85th	Donna Doore	Dem	Donna Doore	Dem
86th	Justin Fecteau	Rep	Justin Fecteau	Rep
87th	Jeffery Hanley	Rep	Jeffery Hanley	Rep
88th	Chloe Maxmin	Dem	**Michael Lemelin**	**Rep**
89th	Holly Stover	Dem	Holly Stover	Dem
90th	Michael Devin	Dem	Lydia Crafts	Dem
91st	Jeffrey Evangelos	Ind	Jeffrey Evangelos	Ind
92nd	Ann Matlak	Dem	Ann Matlack	Dem
93rd	Anne Beebe-Center	Dem	Valli Geiger	Dem
94th	Victoria Doudera	Dem	Victoria Doudera	Dem
95th	William Pluecker	Ind	William Pluecker	Ind
96th	Stanley Zeigler	Dem	Stanley Zeigler	Dem
97th	Janice Dodge	Dem	Janice Dodge	Dem
98th	Scott Cuddy	Dem	Scott Cuddy	Dem
99th	MaryAnne Kinney	Rep	MaryAnne Kinney	Rep
100th	Danny Costain	Rep	Danny Costain	Rep
101st	David G. Haggan	Rep	David G. Haggan	Rep
102nd	Abigail Griffin	Rep	Abigail Griffin	Rep
103rd	Roger E. Reed	Rep	James Thorne	Rep
104th	Steven Foster	Rep	Steven Foster	Rep
105th	Joel Stetkis	Rep	Joel Stetkis	Rep
106th	Scott Walter Strom	Rep	Amanda Collamore	Rep
107th	Betty Austin	Dem	**Jennifer Poirier**	**Rep**
108th	Shelley Rudnicki	Rep	Shelley Rudnicki	Rep
109th	Bruce White	Dem	Bruce White	Dem
110th	Colleen Madigan	Dem	Colleen Madigan	Dem
111th	Philip Curtis	Rep	John Ducharme	Rep
112th	Thomas Skolfield	Rep	Thomas Skolfield	Rep
113th	H. Scott Landry	Dem	H. Scott Landry	Dem
114th	Randall Hall	Rep	Randall Hall	Rep
115th	Josanne Doloff	Rep	Josanne Dolloff	Rep
116th	Richard Pickett	Rep	Richard Pickett	Rep
117th	Frances Head	Rep	Frances Head	Rep
118th	Chad Wayne Grignon	Rep	Chad Wayne Grignon	Rep
119th	Paul Stearns	Rep	Paul Stearns	Rep
120th	Norman Higgins	Ind	**Richard Evans**	**Dem**
121st	Gary Drinkwater	Rep	Gary Drinkwater	Rep
122nd	Michelle Dunphy	Dem	Michelle Dunphy	Dem
123rd	Ryan Tipping	Dem	Laurie Osher	Dem
124th	Aaron Frey	Dem	Joseph Perry	Dem
125th	Victoria Kornfield	Dem	Amy Roeder	Dem
126th	John Schneck	Dem	Laura Supica	Dem
127th	Barbara A. Cardone	Dem	Barbara A. Cardone	Dem
128th	Kevin O'Connell (Note: Incumbent Arthur Verow died on December 19, 2019, and Kevin O'Connell won a special election for the remainder of his term.)	Dem	Kevin O'Connell	Dem
129th	Peter Lyford	Rep	Peter Lyford	Rep
130th	Richard Campbell	Rep	Kathy Downes	Rep
131st	Sherman Hutchins	Rep	Sherman Hutchins	Rep
132nd	Nicole Grohoski	Dem	Nicole Grohoski	Dem
133rd	Sarah Pebworth	Dem	Sarah Pebworth	Dem
134th	Genevieve McDonald	Dem	Genevieve McDonald	Dem
135th	Brian Hubbell	Dem	Lynne Williams	Dem
136th	William Faulkingham	Rep	William Faulkingham	Rep
137th	Lawrence Lockman	Rep	Meldon Carmichael	Rep
138th	Robert Alley	Dem	Robert Alley	Dem
139th	William Tuell	Rep	William Tuell	Rep
140th	Anne C. Perry	Dem	Anne C. Perry	Dem
141st	Kathy Javner	Rep	Kathy Javner	Rep
142nd	Sheldon Hanington	Rep	Jeffery Gifford	Rep
143rd	Stephen Stanley	Dem	**Peggy Stanley**	**Rep**
144th	Gregory Swallow	Rep	Tracy Quint	Rep
145th	Chris Johansen	Rep	Chris Johansen	Rep
146th	Dustin White	Rep	Dustin White	Rep
147th	Harold L. Stewart III	Rep	Joseph Underwood	Rep
148th	David Harold McCrea	Dem	David Harold McCrea	Dem
149th	John DeVeau	Rep	Susan Bernard	Rep
150th	Roland Martin	Dem	Roland Martin	Dem
151st	John L. Martin	Dem	John L. Martin	Dem
**Non-Voting Members**
Passamaquoddy	Rena Newell	NVT (Note: Non-voting tribal member)	Rena Newell	NVT
Maliseet	N/A (Note: The Maliseet chose not to send a Representative to the Maine House for the 129th Legislature.)			

Sources: Incumbents-2018 Maine House of Representatives election; Winners

=== Closest races ===
Seats where the margin of victory was under 10%:

1. **District 96, 0.8%**
2. **District 82, 1.2% gain**
3. **District 58, 1.6% gain**
4. **District 98, 2%**
5. **District 62, 2.4%**
6. **District 66, 2.4%**
7. **District 120, 2.4% gain**
8. **District 53, 2.6%**
9. **District 7, 3.2% gain**
10. **District 49, 3.4%**
11. **District 143, 3.4% gain**
12. **District 16, 3.6%**
13. **District 29, 3.7%**
14. **District 107, 4% gain**
15. **District 10, 4.2% gain**
16. **District 76, 4.8%**
17. **District 89, 5.07%**
18. **District 55, 5.4%**
19. **District 46, 5.8%**
20. **District 68, 6%**
21. **District 18, 6.4%**
22. **District 126, 6.8%**
23. **District 84, 7%**
24. **District 91, 7%**
25. **District 95, 7.2%**
26. **District 88, 7.4% gain**
27. **District 99, 8.8%**
28. **District 71, 9%**
29. **District 64, 9.2% gain**
30. **District 147, 9.2%**
31. **District 128, 9.4%**

== Incumbents not seeking reelection ==
=== Term-limited incumbents ===
22 incumbent representatives (eighteen Democrats, three Republicans and one independent) were term-limited and constitutionally prevented from seeking a fifth consecutive term.

1. Richard Campbell (R), District 130
2. Janice Cooper (D), District 47
3. Mattie Daughtry (D), District 49 (Ran for State Senate)
4. Michael Devin (D), District 90
5. Richard Farnsworth (D), District 37
6. Drew Gattine (D), District 34
7. Sara Gideon (D), District 48 (Ran for U.S. Senate)
8. Craig Hickman (D), District 81
9. Brian Hubbell (D), District 135
10. Erik Jorgensen (D), District 41
11. Victoria Kornfield (D), District 125 (Ran for State Senate)
12. Lawrence Lockman (R), District 137
13. Donald Marean (I), District 16
14. Anne-Marie Mastraccio (D), District 18
15. Andrew McLean (D), District 27
16. Matthew Moonen (D), District 38
17. Catherine Nadeau (D), District 78
18. Roger Reed (R), District 103
19. Deane Rykerson (D), District 1
20. John Schneck (D), District 126
21. Stephen Stanley (D), District 143
22. Ryan Tipping (D), District 123

=== Retiring incumbents ===
Eight incumbent representatives were eligible to seek another term but chose not to.

1. Anne Beebe-Center (D), District 93
2. Anne Carney (D), District 20 (Ran for State Senate)
3. Philip Curtis (R), District 111
4. Diane Denk (D), District 9
5. Sheldon Hanington (R), District 142
6. Chloe Maxmin (D), District 88 (Ran for State Senate)
7. Harold Stewart (R), District 147 (Ran for State Senate)
8. Scott Strom (R), District 106

== Defeated incumbents ==
=== In primary ===
One incumbent representative sought reelection but was defeated in the primary election.

1. John DeVeau (R), District 149

=== In general ===
Nine incumbent representatives sought reelection but were defeated in the general election.

1. Kent Ackley (I), District 82
2. Betty Austin (D), District 107
3. Shawn Babine (D), District 29
4. Jim Handy (D), District 58
5. Norman Higgins (I), District 120
6. Daniel Hobbs (D), District 7
7. Henry Ingwersen (D), District 10
8. Christina Riley (D), District 74
9. Bettyann Sheats (D), District 64

== Detailed results ==
=== District 1 ===
Maine House of Representatives district 1 General Election, 2020
Party	Candidate	Votes	%
Democratic	Kristi Mathieson (incumbent)	4,338	100.0%
Total votes		4,338	100.0%
Democratic hold			

=== District 2 ===
Maine House of Representatives district 2 General Election, 2020
Party	Candidate	Votes	%
Democratic	Michele Meyer	3,874	62.7%
Republican	Dan Ammons	2,306	37.3%
Total votes		6,180	100.0%
Democratic hold			

=== District 3 ===
Maine House of Representatives district 3 General Election, 2020
Party	Candidate	Votes	%
Democratic	Lydia Blume (incumbent)	5,015	100.0%
Total votes		5,433	100.0%
Democratic hold			

=== District 4 ===
Maine House of Representatives district 4 General Election, 2020
Party	Candidate	Votes	%
Democratic	Patricia Hymanson (incumbent)	3,630	58.0%
Republican	John Leifheit	2,631	42.0%
Total votes		6,261	100.0%
Democratic hold			

=== District 5 ===
Maine House of Representatives district 5 General Election, 2020
Party	Candidate	Votes	%
Republican	Beth O'Connor (incumbent)	3,261	62.6%
Democratic	Charles Galemmo	1,947	37.4%
Total votes		5,208	100.0%
Republican hold			

=== District 6 ===
Maine House of Representatives district 6 General Election, 2020
Party	Candidate	Votes	%
Democratic	Tiffany Roberts-Lovell (incumbent)	3,109	55.8%
Republican	Burnell Bailey	2,461	44.2%
Total votes		5,570	100.0%
Democratic hold			

=== District 7 ===
Maine House of Representatives district 7 General Election, 2020
Party	Candidate	Votes	%
Republican	Timothy Roche	3,711	51.6%
Democratic	Daniel Hobbs (incumbent)	3,480	48.4%
Total votes		7,191	100.0%
Republican gain from Democratic			

=== District 8 ===
Maine House of Representatives district 8 General Election, 2020
Party	Candidate	Votes	%
Democratic	Christopher Babbidge (incumbent)	4,256	64.4%
Republican	Todd DiFede	2,352	35.6%
Total votes		6,608	100.0%
Democratic hold			

=== District 9 ===
Maine House of Representatives district 9 General Election, 2020
Party	Candidate	Votes	%
Democratic	Traci Gere	3,359	57.6%
Republican	H. Seavey	2,473	42.4%
Total votes		5,832	100.0%
Democratic hold			

=== District 10 ===
Maine House of Representatives district 10 General Election, 2020
Party	Candidate	Votes	%
Republican	Wayne Parry	3,215	52.1%
Democratic	Henry Ingwersen (incumbent)	2,952	47.9%
Total votes		6,167	100.0%
Republican gain from Democratic			

=== District 11 ===
Maine House of Representatives district 11 General Election, 2020
Party	Candidate	Votes	%
Democratic	Ryan Fecteau (incumbent)	4,096	100%
Total votes		4,096	100.0%
Democratic hold			

=== District 12 ===
Maine House of Representatives district 12 General Election, 2020
Party	Candidate	Votes	%
Democratic	Erin Sheehan	2,662	67.8%
Republican	Timothy Keenan	1,263	32.2%
Total votes		3,925	100.0%
Democratic gain from Independent			

=== District 13 ===
Maine House of Representatives district 13 General Election, 2020
Party	Candidate	Votes	%
Democratic	Lori Gramlich (incumbent)	3,356	55.3%
Republican	Sharri MacDonald	2,711	44.7%
Total votes		6,067	100.0%
Democratic hold			

=== District 14 ===
Maine House of Representatives district 14 General Election, 2020
Party	Candidate	Votes	%
Democratic	Lynn Copeland	3,855	63.3%
Republican	Theodore Sirois	2,233	36.7%
Total votes		6,088	100.0%
Democratic hold			

=== District 15 ===
Maine House of Representatives district 15 General Election, 2020
Party	Candidate	Votes	%
Democratic	Margaret O'Neil (incumbent)	3,420	57.9%
Republican	Marc Chappell	2,482	42.1%
Total votes		5,902	100.0%
Democratic hold			

=== District 16 ===
Maine House of Representatives district 16 General Election, 2020
Party	Candidate	Votes	%
Republican	Nathan Carlow	3,162	51.8%
Democratic	David Durrell	2,942	48.2%
Total votes		6,104	100.0%
Republican hold			

=== District 17 ===
Maine House of Representatives district 17 General Election, 2020
Party	Candidate	Votes	%
Republican	Dwayne W. Prescott (incumbent)	3,138	60.9%
Democratic	Chelsea Sanders	2,011	39.1%
Total votes		5,149	100.0%
Republican hold			

=== District 18 ===
Maine House of Representatives district 18 General Election, 2020
Party	Candidate	Votes	%
Democratic	John Tuttle	2,168	53.2%
Republican	Pamela Buck	1,908	46.8%
Total votes		4,076	100.0%
Democratic hold			

=== District 19 ===
Maine House of Representatives district 19 General Election, 2020
Party	Candidate	Votes	%
Republican	Matthew Harrington (incumbent)	2,622	57.4%
Democratic	Patricia Kidder	1,942	42.6%
Total votes		4,564	100.0%
Republican hold			

=== District 20 ===
Maine House of Representatives district 20 General Election, 2020
Party	Candidate	Votes	%
Republican	Theodore Kryzak (incumbent)	3,406	62.4%
Democratic	Daniel Lauzon	2,052	37.6%
Total votes		5,458	100.0%
Republican hold			

=== District 21 ===
Maine House of Representatives district 21 General Election, 2020
Party	Candidate	Votes	%
Republican	Heidi Sampson (incumbent)	3,052	64.6%
Democratic	Clifford Krolick	1,676	35.4%
Total votes		4,728	100.0%
Republican hold			

=== District 22 ===
Maine House of Representatives district 22 General Election, 2020
Party	Candidate	Votes	%
Republican	Mark Blier (incumbent)	2,659	55.7%
Democratic	Richard Fitzgerald	1,336	28.0%
Green	Michael Barden	779	16.3%
Total votes		4,774	100.0%
Republican hold			

=== District 23 ===
Maine House of Representatives district 23 General Election, 2020
Party	Candidate	Votes	%
Republican	Lester Ordway (incumbent)	3,070	57.2%
Independent	Timothy Goodwin	2,298	42.8%
Total votes		5,368	100.0%
Republican hold			

=== District 24 ===
Maine House of Representatives district 24 General Election, 2020
Party	Candidate	Votes	%
Democratic	Mark Bryant (incumbent)	4,638	100.0%
Total votes		4,638	100.0%
Democratic hold			

=== District 25 ===
Maine House of Representatives district 25 General Election, 2020
Party	Candidate	Votes	%
Republican	Patrick Corey (incumbent)	4,334	100.0%
Total votes		4,334	100.0%
Republican hold			

=== District 26 ===
Maine House of Representatives district 26 General Election, 2020
Party	Candidate	Votes	%
Democratic	Maureen Terry (incumbent)	2,907	57.3%
Republican	George Vercelli	2,163	42.7%
Total votes		5,070	100.0%
Democratic hold			

=== District 27 ===
Maine House of Representatives district 27 General Election, 2020
Party	Candidate	Votes	%
Democratic	Kyle Bailey	3,709	58.5%
Republican	Roger Densmore	2,635	41.5%
Total votes		6,344	100.0%
Democratic hold			

=== District 28 ===
Maine House of Representatives district 28 General Election, 2020
Party	Candidate	Votes	%
Democratic	Christopher Caiazzo (incumbent)	5,300	100.0%
Total votes		5,300	100.0%
Democratic hold			

=== District 29 ===
Maine House of Representatives district 29 General Election, 2020
Party	Candidate	Votes	%
Independent	Sophia Warren	2,544	38.0%
Democratic	Shawn Babine (incumbent)	2,294	34.3%
Republican	Annalee Rosenblatt	1,848	27.6%
Total votes		6,686	100.0%
Independent gain from Democratic			

=== District 30 ===
Maine House of Representatives district 30 General Election, 2020
Party	Candidate	Votes	%
Democratic	Rebecca Millett	4,516	69.8%
Republican	Timothy Thompson	1,954	30.2%
Total votes		6,470	100.0%
Democratic hold			

=== District 31 ===
Maine House of Representatives district 31 General Election, 2020
Party	Candidate	Votes	%
Democratic	Lois Galgay Reckitt (incumbent)	4,845	100.0%
Total votes		4,845	100.0%
Democratic hold			

=== District 32 ===
Maine House of Representatives district 32 General Election, 2020
Party	Candidate	Votes	%
Democratic	Christopher Kessler (incumbent)	4,061	72.3%
Republican	Tammy Walter	1,555	27.7%
Total votes		5,616	100.0%
Democratic hold			

=== District 33 ===
Maine House of Representatives district 33 General Election, 2020
Party	Candidate	Votes	%
Democratic	Victoria Morales (incumbent)	3,797	100.0%
Total votes		3,797	100.0%
Democratic hold			

=== District 34 ===
Maine House of Representatives district 34 General Election, 2020
Party	Candidate	Votes	%
Democratic	Morgan Rielly	4,345	100.0%
Total votes		4,345	100.0%
Democratic hold			

=== District 35 ===
Maine House of Representatives district 35 General Election, 2020
Party	Candidate	Votes	%
Democratic	Suzanne Salisbury	4,450	100.0%
Total votes		4,450	100.0%
Democratic hold			

=== District 36 ===
Maine House of Representatives district 36 General Election, 2020
Party	Candidate	Votes	%
Democratic	Michael F. Brennan (incumbent)	3,615	100.0%%
Total votes		3,615	100.0%
Democratic hold			

=== District 37 ===
Maine House of Representatives district 37 General Election, 2020
Party	Candidate	Votes	%
Democratic	Grayson Lookner	3,545	91.5%
Republican	Jane Frey	330	8.5%
Total votes		3,875	100.0%
Democratic hold			

=== District 38 ===
Maine House of Representatives district 38 General Election, 2020
Party	Candidate	Votes	%
Democratic	Barbara Wood	5,130	100.0%
Total votes		5,130	100.0%
Democratic hold			

=== District 39 ===
Maine House of Representatives district 39 General Election, 2020
Party	Candidate	Votes	%
Democratic	Michael Sylvester (incumbent)	5,169	100.0%
Total votes		5,169	100.0%
Democratic hold			

=== District 40 ===
Maine House of Representatives district 40 General Election, 2020
Party	Candidate	Votes	%
Democratic	Rachel Talbot Ross (incumbent)	3,841	100.0%
Total votes		3,841	100.0%
Democratic hold			

=== District 41 ===
Maine House of Representatives district 41 General Election, 2020
Party	Candidate	Votes	%
Democratic	Samuel Zager	4,876	100.0%
Total votes		4,876	100.0%
Democratic hold			

=== District 42 ===
Maine House of Representatives district 42 General Election, 2020
Party	Candidate	Votes	%
Democratic	Benjamin Collings (incumbent)	3,459	67.8%
Republican	Susan Abercrombie	1,083	21.2%
Green	Carolyn Silvius	557	10.9%
Total votes		5,099	100.0%
Democratic hold			

=== District 43 ===
Maine House of Representatives district 43 General Election, 2020
Party	Candidate	Votes	%
Democratic	W. Edward Crockett (incumbent)	5,092	100.0%
Total votes		5,092	100.0%
Democratic hold			

=== District 44 ===
Maine House of Representatives district 44 General Election, 2020
Party	Candidate	Votes	%
Democratic	Teresa Pierce (incumbent)	5,370	100.0%
Total votes		5,370	100.0%
Democratic hold			

=== District 45 ===
Maine House of Representatives district 45 General Election, 2020
Party	Candidate	Votes	%
Democratic	Stephen Moriarty	4,063	62.6%
Republican	Michael Timmons	2,424	37.4%
Total votes		6,487	100.0%
Democratic hold			

=== District 46 ===
Maine House of Representatives district 46 General Election, 2020
Party	Candidate	Votes	%
Democratic	Braden Sharpe (incumbent)	3,327	52.9%
Republican	Erika Morse	2,960	47.1%
Total votes		6,287	100.0%
Democratic hold			

=== District 47 ===
Maine House of Representatives district 47 General Election, 2020
Party	Candidate	Votes	%
Democratic	Arthur Bell	4,771	70.3%
Republican	Anne Fleming	2,020	29.7%
Total votes		6,791	100.0%
Democratic hold			

=== District 48 ===
Maine House of Representatives district 48 General Election, 2020
Party	Candidate	Votes	%
Democratic	Melanie Sachs	4,204	66.2%
Republican	James Finegan	2,146	33.8%
Total votes		6,350	100.0%
Democratic hold			

=== District 49 ===
Maine House of Representatives district 49 General Election, 2020
Party	Candidate	Votes	%
Democratic	Poppy Arford	3,275	51.7%
Green	K. Frederick Horch	3,054	48.3%
Total votes		6,329	100.0%
Democratic hold			

=== District 50 ===
Maine House of Representatives district 50 General Election, 2020
Party	Candidate	Votes	%
Democratic	Ralph Tucker (incumbent)	4,166	73.6%
Republican	Michael Lawler	1,497	26.4%
Total votes		5,663	100.0%
Democratic hold			

=== District 51 ===
Maine House of Representatives district 51 General Election, 2020
Party	Candidate	Votes	%
Democratic	Joyce McCreight (incumbent)	3,647	57.9%
Republican	Stephen Davis	2,648	42.1%
Total votes		6,295	100.0%
Democratic hold			

=== District 52 ===
Maine House of Representatives district 52 General Election, 2020
Party	Candidate	Votes	%
Democratic	Sean Paulhus	3,339	67.0%
Republican	Christina Hughes	1,644	33.0%
Total votes		4,983	100.0%
Democratic hold			

=== District 53 ===
Maine House of Representatives district 53 General Election, 2020
Party	Candidate	Votes	%
Democratic	Allison Hepler (incumbent)	3,128	51.3%
Republican	Jeffrey Pierce	2,966	48.7%
Total votes		6,094	100.0%
Democratic hold			

=== District 54 ===
Maine House of Representatives district 54 General Election, 2020
Party	Candidate	Votes	%
Democratic	Denise Tepler (incumbent)	3,982	62.6%
Republican	Toni Bashinsky	2,384	37.4%
Total votes		6,366	100.0%
Democratic hold			

=== District 55 ===
Maine House of Representatives district 55 General Election, 2020
Party	Candidate	Votes	%
Democratic	Seth Berry (incumbent)	2,021	52.7%
Republican	Peter Lewis	1,815	47.3%
Total votes		3,836	100.0%
Democratic hold			

=== District 56 ===
Maine House of Representatives district 56 General Election, 2020
Party	Candidate	Votes	%
Republican	Richard Mason (incumbent)	3,174	61.7%
Democratic	Scott Gaiason	1,971	38.3%
Total votes		5,145	100.0%
Republican hold			

=== District 57 ===
Maine House of Representatives district 57 General Election, 2020
Party	Candidate	Votes	%
Republican	Thomas Martin	3,395	64.5%
Democratic	Patricia Fogg	1,872	35.5%
Total votes		5,267	100.0%
Republican hold			

=== District 58 ===
Maine House of Representatives district 58 General Election, 2020
Party	Candidate	Votes	%
Republican	Jonathan Connor	2,572	50.8%
Democratic	James R. Handy (incumbent)	2,488	49.2%
Total votes		5,060	100.0%
Republican gain from Democratic			

=== District 59 ===
Maine House of Representatives district 59 General Election, 2020
Party	Candidate	Votes	%
Democratic	Margaret Craven (incumbent)	2,964	57.3%
Republican	John Reeder	2,210	42.7%
Total votes		5,174	100.0%
Democratic hold			

=== District 60 ===
Maine House of Representatives district 60 General Election, 2020
Party	Candidate	Votes	%
Democratic	Kristen Cloutier (incumbent)	2,456	71.3%
Republican	John Morrison	988	28.7%
Total votes		3,444	100.0%
Democratic hold			

=== District 61 ===
Maine House of Representatives district 61 General Election, 2020
Party	Candidate	Votes	%
Democratic	Heidi Brooks (incumbent)	2,421	100.0%
Total votes		2,421	100.0%
Democratic hold			

=== District 62 ===
Maine House of Representatives district 62 General Election, 2020
Party	Candidate	Votes	%
Democratic	Gina Melaragno (incumbent)	1,590	51.2%
Independent	John Michael	1,514	48.8%
Total votes		3,104	100%
Democratic hold			

=== District 63 ===
Maine House of Representatives district 63 General Election, 2020
Party	Candidate	Votes	%
Republican	Bruce Bickford (incumbent)	3,988	100.0%
Total votes		3,998	100.0%
Republican hold			

=== District 64 ===
Maine House of Representatives district 64 General Election, 2020
Party	Candidate	Votes	%
Republican	Laurel Libby	2,945	54.6%
Democratic	Bettyann Sheats (incumbent)	2,445	45.4%
Total votes		5,390	100.0%
Republican gain from Democratic			

=== District 65 ===
Maine House of Representatives district 65 General Election, 2020
Party	Candidate	Votes	%
Republican	Amy Arata (incumbent)	3,206	59.4%
Democratic	Misty Coolidge	2,193	40.6%
Total votes		5,399	100.0%
Republican hold			

=== District 66 ===
Maine House of Representatives district 66 General Election, 2020
Party	Candidate	Votes	%
Democratic	Jessica Fay (incumbent)	2,884	51.2%
Republican	Gregory Foster	2,745	48.8%
Total votes		5,629	100.0%
Democratic hold			

=== District 67 ===
Maine House of Representatives district 67 General Election, 2020
Party	Candidate	Votes	%
Republican	Susan Austin (incumbent)	3,085	54.4%
Democratic	Susan Accardi	1,669	29.5%
Independent	Mark Grover	913	16.1%
Total votes		5,667	100.0%
Republican hold			

=== District 68 ===
Maine House of Representatives district 68 General Election, 2020
Party	Candidate	Votes	%
Republican	Richard Cebra (incumbent)	3,052	53.0%
Independent	Patrick Scully	2,709	47.0%
Total votes		5,761	100.0%
Republican hold			

=== District 69 ===
Maine House of Representatives district 69 General Election, 2020
Party	Candidate	Votes	%
Independent	Walter Riseman (incumbent)	3,035	55.6%
Republican	Michael Davis	2,421	44.4%
Total votes		5,456	100.0%
Independent hold			

=== District 70 ===
Maine House of Representatives district 70 General Election, 2020
Party	Candidate	Votes	%
Republican	Nathan Wadsworth (incumbent)	3,134	59.8%
Democratic	Nathan Burnett	2,110	40.2%
Total votes		5,244	100.0%
Republican hold			

=== District 71 ===
Maine House of Representatives district 71 General Election, 2020
Party	Candidate	Votes	%
Republican	H. Sawin Millett (incumbent	2,743	54.5%
Democratic	Kenneth Morse	2,286	45.5%
Total votes		5,029	100.0%
Republican hold			

=== District 72 ===
Maine House of Representatives district 72 General Election, 2020
Party	Candidate	Votes	%
Republican	Kathleen Dillingham (incumbent)	3,230	63.9%
Democratic	Jennifer Blastow	1,826	36.1%
Total votes		5,056	100.0%
Republican hold			

=== District 73 ===
Maine House of Representatives district 73 General Election, 2020
Party	Candidate	Votes	%
Republican	John Andrews (incumbent)	2,877	63.8%
Democratic	Joshua Woodburn	1,631	36.2%
Total votes		4,508	100.0%
Republican hold			

=== District 74 ===
Maine House of Representatives district 74 General Election, 2020
Party	Candidate	Votes	%
Republican	Sheila Lyman	3,094	57.4%
Democratic	Christina Riley (incumbent)	2,298	42.6%
Total votes		5,392	100.0%
Republican gain from Democratic			

=== District 75 ===
Maine House of Representatives district 75 General Election, 2020
Party	Candidate	Votes	%
Republican	Joshua Morris (incumbent)	2,599	55.4%
Democratic	John Nutting	2,094	44.6%
Total votes		4,693	100.0%
Republican hold			

=== District 76 ===
Maine House of Representatives district 76 General Election, 2020
Party	Candidate	Votes	%
Republican	Daniel Newman	3,145	52.4%
Democratic	Deborah Emery	2,860	47.6%
Total votes		6,005	100.0%
Republican hold			

=== District 77 ===
Maine House of Representatives district 77 General Election, 2020
Party	Candidate	Votes	%
Republican	Michael D. Perkins (incumbent)	3,653	68.1%
Democratic	Marion Menair	1,714	31.9%
Total votes		5,367	100.0%
Republican hold			

=== District 78 ===
Maine House of Representatives district 78 General Election, 2020
Party	Candidate	Votes	%
Republican	Cathy Nadeau	2,777	56.0%
Democratic	Raymond Caron	2,180	44.0%
Total votes		4,957	100.0%
Republican hold			

=== District 79 ===
Maine House of Representatives district 79 General Election, 2020
Party	Candidate	Votes	%
Republican	Timothy Theriault (incumbent)	3,260	66.5%
Democratic	Lindsey Harwath	1,640	33.5%
Total votes		4,900	100.0%
Republican hold			

=== District 80 ===
Maine House of Representatives district 80 General Election, 2020
Party	Candidate	Votes	%
Republican	Richard Bradstreet (incumbent)	3,323	66.2%
Democratic	Gregory Hallee	1,698	33.8%
Total votes		5,021	100.0%
Republican hold			

=== District 81 ===
Maine House of Representatives district 81 General Election, 2020
Party	Candidate	Votes	%
Democratic	Tavis Hasenfus	3,201	56.5%
Republican	Joseph Pietroski	2,465	43.5%
Total votes		5,666	100.0%
Democratic hold			

=== District 82 ===
Maine House of Representatives district 82 General Election, 2020
Party	Candidate	Votes	%
Republican	Randall Greenwood	2,699	50.6%
Independent	Kent Ackley (incumbent)	2,640	49.4%
Total votes		5,339	100.0%
Republican gain from Independent			

=== District 83 ===
Maine House of Representatives district 83 General Election, 2020
Party	Candidate	Votes	%
Democratic	Thomas Harnett	2,858	58.7%
Republican	Christopher Dilts	2,012	41.3%
Total votes		4,870	100.0%
Democratic hold			

=== District 84 ===
Maine House of Representatives district 84 General Election, 2020
Party	Candidate	Votes	%
Democratic	Charlotte Warren (incumbent)	3,063	53.5%
Republican	Scott Taylor	2,666	46.5%
Total votes		5,729	100.0%
Democratic hold			

=== District 85 ===
Maine House of Representatives district 85 General Election, 2020
Party	Candidate	Votes	%
Democratic	Donna Doore (incumbent)	2,691	60.1%
Republican	William Clardy	1,784	39.9%
Total votes		4,475	100.0%
Democratic hold			

=== District 86 ===
Maine House of Representatives district 86 General Election, 2020
Party	Candidate	Votes	%
Republican	Justin Fecteau (incumbent)	2,384	57.0%
Democratic	Adam Turner	1,795	43.0%
Total votes		4,179	100.0%
Republican hold			

=== District 87 ===
Maine House of Representatives district 87 General Election, 2020
Party	Candidate	Votes	%
Republican	Jeffery Hanley (incumbent)	3,117	56.3%
Democratic	Timothy Marks	2,419	43.7%
Total votes		5,536	100.0%
Republican hold			

=== District 88 ===
Maine House of Representatives district 88 General Election, 2020
Party	Candidate	Votes	%
Republican	Michael Lemelin	2,842	53.7%
Democratic	Christopher Hamilton	2,446	46.3%
Total votes		5,288	100.0%
Republican gain from Democratic			

=== District 89 ===
Maine House of Representatives district 89 General Election, 2020
Party	Candidate	Votes	%
Democratic	Holly Stover (incumbent)	3,242	51.57%
Republican	Stephanie Hawke	2,815	46.5%
Total votes		6,057	100.0%
Democratic hold			

=== District 90 ===
Maine House of Representatives district 90 General Election, 2020
Party	Candidate	Votes	%
Democratic	Lydia Crafts	3,962	64.6%
Republican	Merle Parise	2,171	35.4%
Total votes		6,133	100.0%
Democratic hold			

=== District 91 ===
Maine House of Representatives district 91 General Election, 2020
Party	Candidate	Votes	%
Independent	Jeffrey Evangelos (incumbent)	2,761	53.5%
Republican	Lowell Wallace	2,400	46.5%
Total votes		5,161	100.0%
Independent hold			

=== District 92 ===
Maine House of Representatives district 92 General Election, 2020
Party	Candidate	Votes	%
Democratic	Ann Matlack (incumbent)	3,894	100.0%
Total votes		3,894	100.0%
Democratic hold			

=== District 93 ===
Maine House of Representatives district 93 General Election, 2020
Party	Candidate	Votes	%
Democratic	Valli Geiger	2,675	55.0%
Republican	Michael Mullins	2,188	45.0%
Total votes		4,863	100.0%
Democratic hold			

=== District 94 ===
Maine House of Representatives district 94 General Election, 2020
Party	Candidate	Votes	%
Democratic	Victoria Doudera (incumbent)	5,410	100.0%
Total votes		5,410	100.0%
Democratic hold			

=== District 95 ===
Maine House of Representatives district 95 General Election, 2020
Party	Candidate	Votes	%
Independent	William Pluecker (incumbent)	2,767	53.6%
Republican	Molly Luce	2,393	46.4%
Total votes		5,160	100.0%
Independent hold			

=== District 96 ===
Maine House of Representatives district 96 General Election, 2020
Party	Candidate	Votes	%
Democratic	Stanley Zeigler (incumbent)	2,944	50.4%
Republican	Katrina Smith	2,899	49.6%
Total votes		5,843	100.0%
Democratic hold			

=== District 97 ===
Maine House of Representatives district 97 General Election, 2020
Party	Candidate	Votes	%
Democratic	Janice Dodge (incumbent)	3,789	66.9%
Republican	William Elliott	1,871	33.1%
Total votes		5,660	100.0%
Democratic hold			

=== District 98 ===
Maine House of Representatives district 98 General Election, 2020
Party	Candidate	Votes	%
Democratic	Scott Cuddy (incumbent)	2,691	51.0%
Republican	Jessica Connor	2,586	49.0%
Total votes		5,277	100.0%
Democratic hold			

=== District 99 ===
Maine House of Representatives district 99 General Election, 2020
Party	Candidate	Votes	%
Republican	MaryAnne Kinney (incumbent)	2,682	54.4%
Democratic	April Turner	2,248	45.6%
Total votes		4,930	100.0%
Republican hold			

=== District 100 ===
Maine House of Representatives district 100 General Election, 2020
Party	Candidate	Votes	%
Republican	Danny Costain (incumbent)	3,499	72.4%
Democratic	Carroll Payne	1,333	27.6%
Total votes		4,832	100.0%
Republican hold			

=== District 101 ===
Maine House of Representatives district 101 General Election, 2020
Party	Candidate	Votes	%
Republican	David Haggan (incumbent)	3,690	64.1%
Democratic	William Lippincott	2,069	35.9%
Total votes		5,759	100.0%
Republican hold			

=== District 102 ===
Maine House of Representatives district 102 General Election, 2020
Party	Candidate	Votes	%
Republican	Abigail Griffin (incumbent)	4,158	100.0%
Total votes		4,158	100.0%
Republican hold			

=== District 103 ===
Maine House of Representatives district 103 General Election, 2020
Party	Candidate	Votes	%
Republican	James Thorne	3,612	62.9%
Democratic	Robin Russel	2,127	37.1%
Total votes		5,739	100.0%
Republican hold			

=== District 104 ===
Maine House of Representatives district 104 General Election, 2020
Party	Candidate	Votes	%
Republican	Steven Foster (incumbent)	3,702	100.0%
Total votes		3,702	100.0%
Republican hold			

=== District 105 ===
Maine House of Representatives district 105 General Election, 2020
Party	Candidate	Votes	%
Republican	Joel Stetkis (incumbent)	4,049	100.0%
Total votes		4,049	100.0%
Republican hold			

=== District 106 ===
Maine House of Representatives district 106 General Election, 2020
Party	Candidate	Votes	%
Republican	Amanda Collamore	2,552	62.5%
Democratic	Ethan Brownell	1,534	37.5%
Total votes		4,086	100.0%
Republican hold			

=== District 107 ===
Maine House of Representatives district 107 General Election, 2020
Party	Candidate	Votes	%
Republican	Jennifer Poirier	2,137	52.0%
Democratic	Betty Austin (incumbent)	1,969	48.0%
Total votes		4,106	100.0%
Republican gain from Democratic			

=== District 108 ===
Maine House of Representatives district 108 General Election, 2020
Party	Candidate	Votes	%
Republican	Shelley Rudnicki (incumbent)	2,401	55.0%
Democratic	Nathaniel White	1,962	45.0%
Total votes		4,363	100.0%
Republican hold			

=== District 109 ===
Maine House of Representatives district 109 General Election, 2020
Party	Candidate	Votes	%
Democratic	Bruce White (incumbent)	2,945	67.5%
Republican	Richard Foss	1,420	32.5%
Total votes		4,365	100.0%
Democratic hold			

=== District 110 ===
Maine House of Representatives district 110 General Election, 2020
Party	Candidate	Votes	%
Democratic	Colleen Madigan (incumbent)	2,559	60.9%
Independent	Mark Andre	1,644	39.1%
Total votes		4,223	100.0%
Democratic hold			

=== District 111 ===
Maine House of Representatives district 111 General Election, 2020
Party	Candidate	Votes	%
Republican	John Ducharme	3,933	100.0%
Total votes		3,933	100.0%
Republican hold			

=== District 112 ===
Maine House of Representatives district 112 General Election, 2020
Party	Candidate	Votes	%
Republican	Thomas Skolfield (incumbent)	3,165	64.6%
Democratic	Peter Bourgelais	1,734	35.4%
Total votes		4,897	100.0%
Republican hold			

=== District 113 ===
Maine House of Representatives district 113 General Election, 2020
Party	Candidate	Votes	%
Democratic	H. Scott Landry (incumbent)	2,788	58.2%
Republican	Stephan Bunker	2,000	41.8%
Total votes		4,788	100.0
Democratic hold			

=== District 114 ===
Maine House of Representatives district 114 General Election, 2020
Party	Candidate	Votes	%
Republican	Randall Hall (incumbent)	3,149	65.1%
Democratic	Gregory Kimber	1,685	34.9%
Total votes		4,834	100.0%
Republican hold			

=== District 115 ===
Maine House of Representatives district 115 General Election, 2020
Party	Candidate	Votes	%
Republican	Josanne Dolloff (incumbent)	2,564	57.3%
Democratic	John Patrick	1,912	42.7%
Total votes		4,476	100.0%
Republican hold			

=== District 116 ===
Maine House of Representatives district 116 General Election, 2020
Party	Candidate	Votes	%
Republican	Richard Pickett (incumbent)	3,232	69.4%
Democratic	Christopher Berryment	1,422	30.6%
Total votes		4,654	100.0%
Republican hold			

=== District 117 ===
Maine House of Representatives district 117 General Election, 2020
Party	Candidate	Votes	%
Republican	Frances Head (incumbent)	3,026	55.0%
Democratic	Savannah Sessions	2,471	45.0%
Total votes		5,497	100.0%
Republican hold			

=== District 118 ===
Maine House of Representatives district 118 General Election, 2020
Party	Candidate	Votes	%
Republican	Chad Grignon (incumbent)	3,269	100.0%
Total votes		3,269	100.0%
Republican hold			

=== District 119 ===
Maine House of Representatives district 119 General Election, 2020
Party	Candidate	Votes	%
Republican	Paul Stearns (incumbent)	3,296	70.5%
Democratic	Margarita Contreni	1,377	29.5%
Total votes		4,673	100.0%
Republican hold			

=== District 120 ===
Maine House of Representatives district 120 General Election, 2020
Party	Candidate	Votes	%
Democratic	Richard Evans	1,631	35.7%
Republican	Chad Perkins	1,520	33.3%
Independent	Norman Higgins (incumbent)	1,419	31.1%
Total votes		4,570	100.0%
Democratic gain from Independent			

=== District 121 ===
Maine House of Representatives district 121 General Election, 2020
Party	Candidate	Votes	%
Republican	Gary Drinkwater (incumbent)	2,924	68.8%
Democratic	Megan Smith	1,325	31.2%
Total votes		4,249	100.0%
Republican hold			

=== District 122 ===
Maine House of Representatives district 122 General Election, 2020
Party	Candidate	Votes	%
Democratic	Michelle Dunphy (incumbent)	2,599	62.3%
Republican	Edward Paradis	1,576	37.7%
Total votes		4,175	100.0%
Democratic hold			

=== District 123 ===
Maine House of Representatives district 123 General Election, 2020
Party	Candidate	Votes	%
Democratic	Laurie Osher	2,958	72.1%
Republican	Cameron Bowie	1,147	27.9%
Total votes		4,105	100.0%
Democratic hold			

=== District 124 ===
Maine House of Representatives district 124 General Election, 2020
Party	Candidate	Votes	%
Democratic	Joseph Perry	2,995	63.1%
Republican	Daniel LaPointe	1,750	36.9%
Total votes		4,745	100.0%
Democratic hold			

=== District 125 ===
Maine House of Representatives district 125 General Election, 2020
Party	Candidate	Votes	%
Democratic	Amy Roeder	3,137	100.0%
Total votes		3,137	100.0%
Democratic hold			

=== District 126 ===
Maine House of Representatives district 126 General Election, 2020
Party	Candidate	Votes	%
Democratic	Laura Supica	1,770	53.4%
Republican	Joshua Hiatt	1,547	46.6%
Total votes		3,317	100.0%
Democratic hold			

=== District 127 ===
Maine House of Representatives district 127 General Election, 2020
Party	Candidate	Votes	%
Democratic	Barbara Cardone (incumbent)	2,529	64.2%
Republican	Noah Hall	1,409	35.8%
Total votes		3,938	100.0%
Democratic hold			

=== District 128 ===
Maine House of Representatives district 128 General Election, 2020
Party	Candidate	Votes	%
Democratic	Kevin O'Connell (incumbent)	2,578	54.7%
Republican	Garrel Craig	2,131	45.3%
Total votes		4,709	100.0%
Democratic hold			

=== District 129 ===
Maine House of Representatives district 129 General Election, 2020
Party	Candidate	Votes	%
Republican	Peter Lyford (incumbent)	4,339	100.0%
Total votes		4,339	100.0%
Republican hold			

=== District 130 ===
Maine House of Representatives district 130 General Election, 2020
Party	Candidate	Votes	%
Republican	Kathy Downes	3,331	63.8%
Democratic	Nicolas Delli Paoli	1,892	36.2%
Total votes		5,223	100.0%
Republican hold			

=== District 131 ===
Maine House of Representatives district 131 General Election, 2020
Party	Candidate	Votes	%
Republican	Sherman Hutchins (incumbent)	3,267	58.8%
Democratic	Veronica Magnan	2,292	41.2%
Total votes		5,559	100.0%
Republican hold			

=== District 132 ===
Maine House of Representatives district 132 General Election, 2020
Party	Candidate	Votes	%
Democratic	Nicole Grohoski (incumbent)	3,061	55.1%
Republican	Michelle Kaplan	2,497	44.9%
Total votes		5,558	100.0%
Democratic hold			

=== District 133 ===
Maine House of Representatives district 133 General Election, 2020
Party	Candidate	Votes	%
Democratic	Sarah Pebworth (incumbent)	4,402	100.0%
Total votes		4,402	100.0%
Democratic hold			

=== District 134 ===
Maine House of Representatives district 134 General Election, 2020
Party	Candidate	Votes	%
Democratic	Genevieve McDonald (incumbent)	4,367	100.0%
Total votes		44,367	100.0%
Democratic hold			

=== District 135 ===
Maine House of Representatives district 135 General Election, 2020
Party	Candidate	Votes	%
Democratic	Lynne Williams	3,339	55.8%
Republican	Timothy Oh	1,835	30.7%
Independent	Benjamin Meiklejohn	805	13.5%
Total votes		5,979	100.0%
Democratic hold			

=== District 136 ===
Maine House of Representatives district 136 General Election, 2020
Party	Candidate	Votes	%
Republican	William Faulkingham (incumbent)	3,151	64.1%
Democratic	Antonio Blasi	1,765	35.9%
Total votes		4,916	100.0%
Republican hold			

=== District 137 ===
Maine House of Representatives district 137 General Election, 2020
Party	Candidate	Votes	%
Republican	Meldon Carmichael	2,666	65.3%
Democratic	Maxwell Coolidge	1,418	34.7%
Total votes		4,084	100.0%
Republican hold			

=== District 138 ===
Maine House of Representatives district 138 General Election, 2020
Party	Candidate	Votes	%
Democratic	Robert Alley (incumbent)	2,499	58.0%
Republican	Kimberley Robinson	1,806	42.0%
Total votes		4,305	100.0%
Democratic hold			

=== District 139 ===
Maine House of Representatives district 139 General Election, 2020
Party	Candidate	Votes	%
Republican	William Tuell (incumbent)	3,407	72.5%
Democratic	Patricia Godin	1,290	27.5%
Total votes		4,697	100.0%
Republican hold			

=== District 140 ===
Maine House of Representatives district 140 General Election, 2020
Party	Candidate	Votes	%
Democratic	Anne Perry (incumbent)	2,011	61.7%
Republican	Michael Lawson	1,250	38.3%
Total votes		3,261	100.0%
Democratic hold			

=== District 141 ===
Maine House of Representatives district 141 General Election, 2020
Party	Candidate	Votes	%
Republican	Kathy Javner (incumbent)	3,060	77.9%
Democratic	Donald Green	868	22.1%
Total votes		3,928	100.0%
Republican hold			

=== District 142 ===
Maine House of Representatives district 142 General Election, 2020
Party	Candidate	Votes	%
Republican	Jeffery Gifford	3,042	72.1%
Democratic	Natalie DiPentino	1,175	27.9%
Total votes		4,217	100.0%
Republican hold			

=== District 143 ===
Maine House of Representatives district 143 General Election, 2020
Party	Candidate	Votes	%
Republican	Peggy Stanley	2,317	51.7%
Democratic	Charles Pray	2,162	48.3%
Total votes		4,479	100.0%
Republican gain from Democratic			

=== District 144 ===
Maine House of Representatives district 144 General Election, 2020
Party	Candidate	Votes	%
Republican	Tracy Quint	2,705	68.3%
Democratic	Kathryn Harnish	1,258	31.7%
Total votes		3,963	100.0%
Republican hold			

=== District 145 ===
Maine House of Representatives district 145 General Election, 2020
Party	Candidate	Votes	%
Republican	Chris Johansen (incumbent)	3,286	76.8%
Democratic	Robert Zabierek	993	23.2%
Total votes		4,279	100.0%
Republican hold			

=== District 146 ===
Maine House of Representatives district 146 General Election, 2020
Party	Candidate	Votes	%
Republican	Dustin White (incumbent)	3,891	100.0%
Total votes		3,891	100.0%
Republican hold			

=== District 147 ===
Maine House of Representatives district 147 General Election, 2020
Party	Candidate	Votes	%
Republican	Joseph Underwood	2,074	54.6%
Democratic	Lillie Lavado	1,728	45.4%
Total votes		3,802	100.0%
Republican hold			

=== District 148 ===
Maine House of Representatives district 148 General Election, 2020
Party	Candidate	Votes	%
Democratic	David McCrea (incumbent)	2,204	56.9%
Republican	Brian Redmond	1,669	43.1%
Total votes		3,873	100.0%
Democratic hold			

=== District 149 ===
Maine House of Representatives district 149 General Election, 2020
Party	Candidate	Votes	%
Republican	Susan Bernard	3,654	100.0%
Total votes		3,654	100.0%
Republican hold			

=== District 150 ===
Maine House of Representatives district 150 General Election, 2020
Party	Candidate	Votes	%
Democratic	Roland Martin (incumbent)	2,680	59.9%
Republican	Aaron Cyr	1,793	40.1%
Total votes		4,473	100.0%
Democratic hold			

=== District 151 ===
Maine House of Representatives district 151 General Election, 2020
Party	Candidate	Votes	%
Democratic	John L. Martin (incumbent)	2,711	56.6%
Republican	Kevin Bushey	2,077	43.4%
Total votes		4,788	100.0%
Democratic hold			

== See also ==
- 2020 Maine elections
- Passamaquoddy
- Maliseet
- 2020 Maine State Senate election
- 2020 United States elections
- Maine House of Representatives
- Maine Senate
- 2020 United States House of Representatives elections in Maine
- 2020 United States Senate election in Maine
- List of Maine state legislatures
