= Lloyd Herrick =

Maine state representative

Member of the Maine House of Representatives from the 73rd district
- In office December 3, 2014 – December 5, 2018
- Preceded by: Nate Libby
- Succeeded by: John Andrews

Personal details
- Party: Republican
- Spouse: Deborah Venteresca
- Education: University of Maine (BA)
- Website: Legislative website

Lloyd C. "Skip" Herrick is an American politician and former law enforcement officer. Herrick served as the Representative for the 73rd district in the Maine House of Representatives from 2014 to 2018. He previously served as the County Sheriff of Oxford and was Chief of Police of Paris from 1980 to 1990.

== Personal life ==
Herrick lives with his wife in Paris, Maine. He graduated from University of Maine, majoring in criminal justice. Herrick is a Freemason.
