= Verow =

Verow is a surname. Notable people with the surname include:

- Arthur Verow (1942–2019), American politician
- Todd Verow (born 1966), American film director
