= Hymanson =

Hymanson is a surname. Notable people with the surname include:

- Jeffrey Hymanson (born 1954), American ice hockey player
- Patricia Hymanson, American physician and politician
