= List of mayors of Brewer, Maine =

The following is a list of mayors of the city of Brewer, Maine, United States.

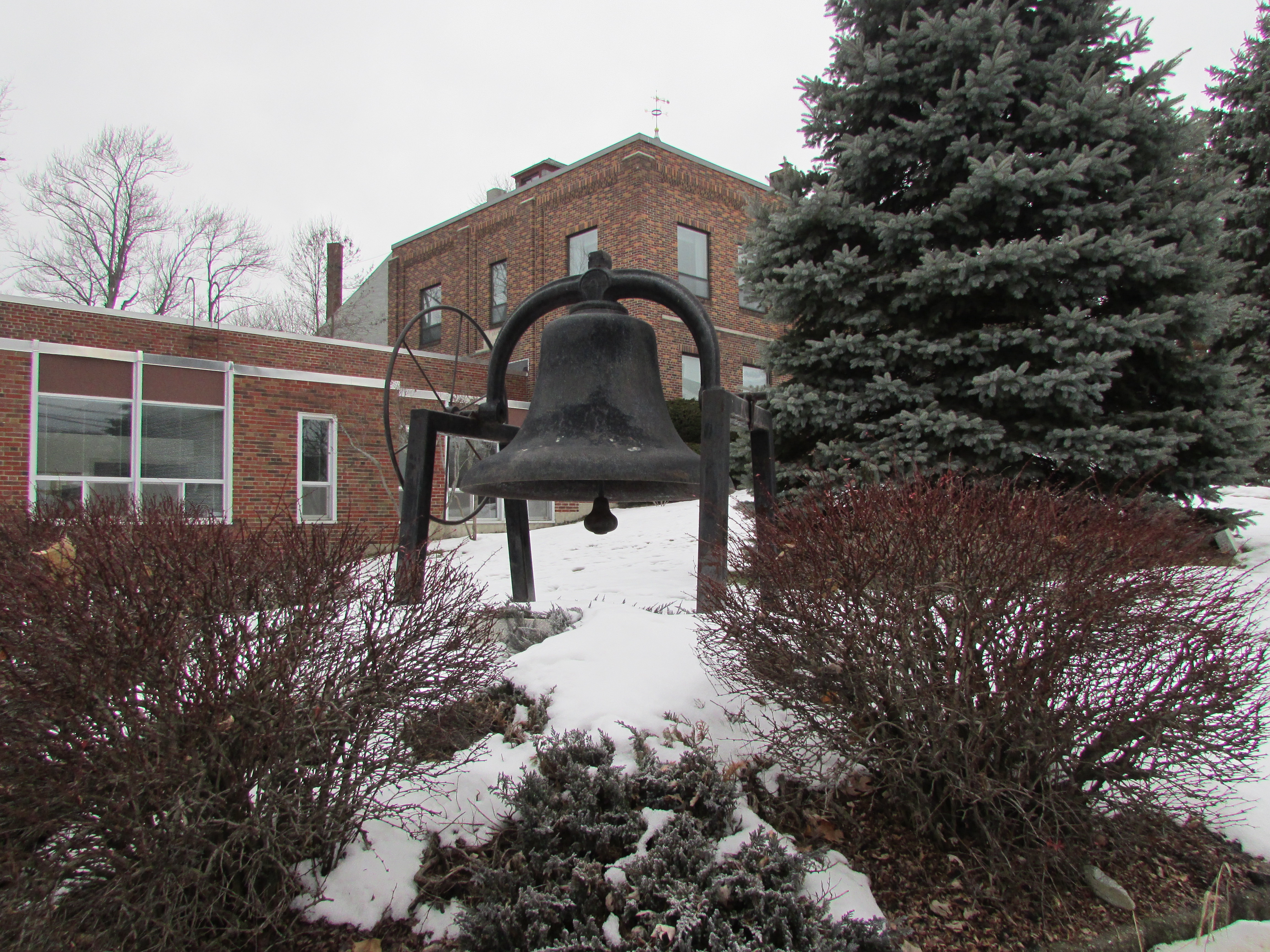
Bell on display outside city hall building on North Main Street in Brewer, Maine, 2014

- Harlan P. Sargent, 1889-1890
- Jasper Hutchings, 1891
- Henry F. Tefft, 1892-1894
- Frank H. Nickerson, 1895, 1913-1916
- Bisbee B. Merrill, 1896-1897
- D. Allston Sargent, 1898-1899
- Charles J. Hutchings, 1900-1901
- Leon F. Higgins, 1902-1904
- Hadley C. Clapp, 1905-1906
- Charles H. Small, 1907-1908
- Ambrose F. Pendleton, 1909-1919
- Victor H. Mutty, 1911-1912
- Charles W. Curtis, 1917-1918
- Charles J. Hutchings, 1919-1920
- Chester D. Merrifield, 1921-1922
- John B. Stuart, 1923
- Frank R. Cowan, 1924-1926
- Miles R. Fayle, ca.1960-1961
- Madelin F. Kiah, ca.1961-1966
- Arthur L. Reed, ca.1966-1977
- Jerry W. Goss, ca.2012, 2020
- Kevin O'Connell, ca.2013, 2017
- Matt Vachon, ca.2015
- Beverly Uhlenhake, 2019
- Michele Daniels, ca. 2021, 2022, 2025, 2027
- Soubahn Phanthay, ca. 2023
- Jenn Morin, ca.2024, 2026

== See also ==
- Brewer history
