= Warren Platner =

American architect and interior designer (1919–2006)

- Born: Joseph Warren Platner; June 18, 1919; Baltimore, Maryland, U.S.
- Died: April 17, 2006 (aged 86); New Haven, Connecticut, U.S.
- Occupations: Architect, interior designer
- Years active: 1941–2006
- Spouse: Joyce Payne
- Children: 4
- Relatives: Graham Platner (grandson)

Joseph Warren Platner (June 18, 1919 – April 17, 2006) was an American architect and interior designer.

Platner produced a furniture collection that has proved to be a continuing icon of 1960s modernism. He is noted for designing several prominent interiors in New York City, including the headquarters of the Ford Foundation Building and the original Windows on the World restaurant, atop the World Trade Center.

== Early career ==
Joseph Warren Platner was born in Baltimore, Maryland, the son of Alice (Chapman) and Warren Kelley Platner. In 1941, he graduated from Cornell University with a degree in architecture. His career began with work in some of the most prominent and remarkable architecture practices in the country. Between 1945 and 1950, he worked for Raymond Loewy and I.M. Pei.

He received the Rome Prize in architecture in 1955. In 1967, Platner opened his own firm, Warren Platner Associates, in New Haven, Connecticut. He resided in Guilford.

== Furniture design ==
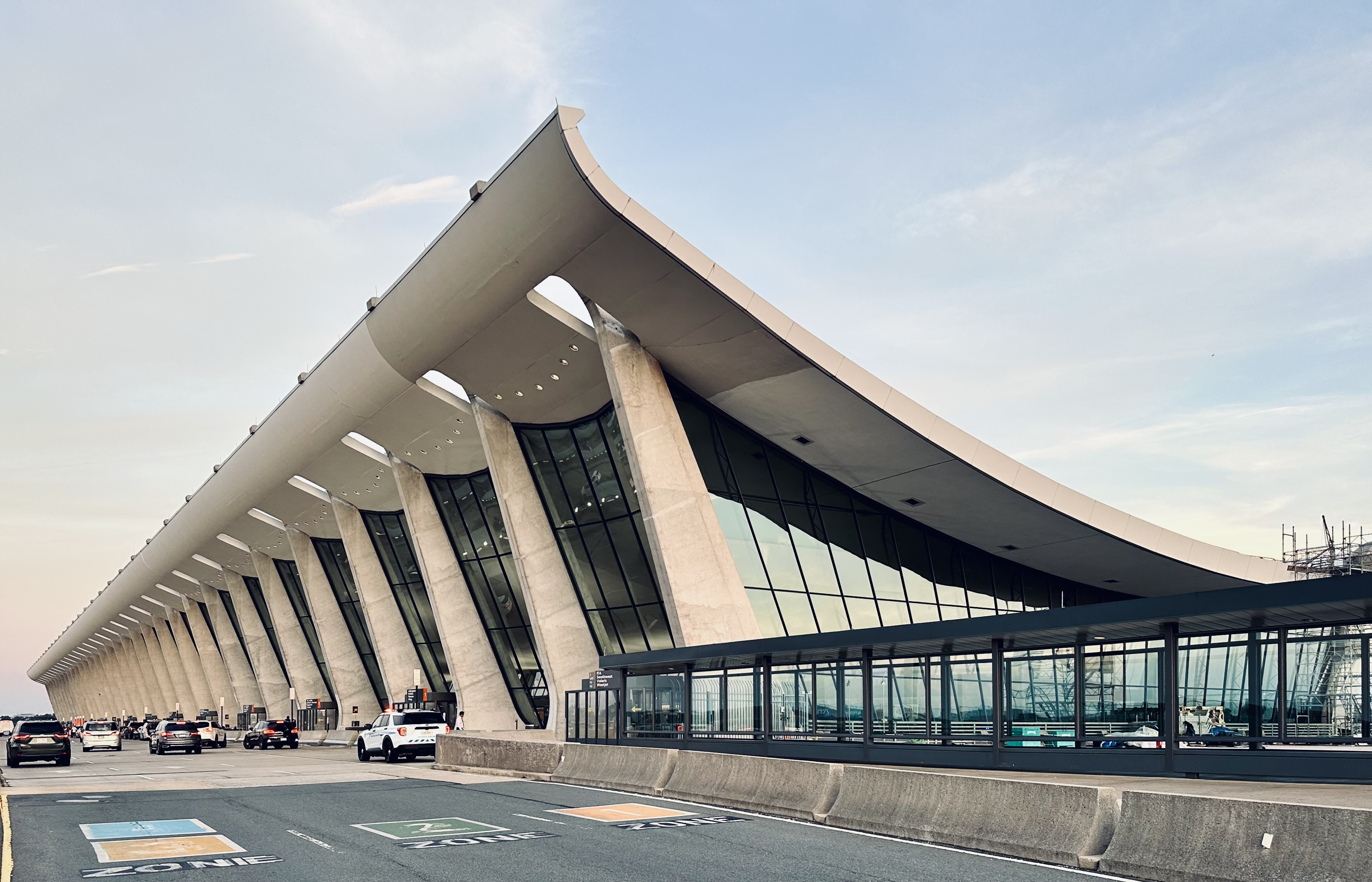
Dulles Terminal

Platner was a part of Eero Saarinen's office from 1960 to 1965, participating in the designs for the Dulles International Airport Main Terminal in Washington, D.C., the Repertory Theatre at Lincoln Center, John Deere World Headquarters, and several dormitories at Yale University.

Platner worked with the firms of Eero Saarinen and Kevin Roche in the early and mid-1960s. Platner unveiled his seminal collection of chairs, ottomans and tables in 1966. Produced by Knoll International, with the aid of a grant from the Graham Foundation, each piece rested on a sculptural base of nickel-plated steel rods resembling a "shiny sheaf of wheat", according to the Knoll catalogue.

Production was complicated. The sculptural bases were made of hundreds of rods, and for some chairs, required more than 1,000 welds. An intricate cylindrical mesh steel base, creating a unique architectural play between the interior and exterior space, supported the upholstered seat.

The collection has been in continuous production since its introduction, highlighting the ever-growing interest by collectors of mid-century modern design. (Knoll has brought back the previously discontinued large "Easy" chair and ottoman, but the loveseat remains discontinued.)

In 1973, Knoll introduced The Platner Executive Office Collection. The thin profile executive desk featured a bullnose oak perimeter with black leather writing surface, supported by polished chrome legs and extended feet. Drawers of varying sizes could be mounted underneath the desk for storage. The collection included matching leather-covered credenzas with upper storage units, square and round tables, desk extensions and other accessories.

Platner outlined the definition of a 'classic' as being, something that every time you look at it, you accept it as it is and you see no way of improving it.

== Interior design ==
As the head of interior design at Kevin Roche's firm Roche-Dinkeloo, Platner created office spaces that were flexible, understated and efficient. He chose a rich, quiet colour scheme to create a warm environment and installed custom-made furniture designed to eliminate needless effort. Ergonomic desks included built-in telephones and special compartments for files and office machines.

Platner was a believer that a building's design should come from within: "I try to conceive of what would be the best atmosphere, the best character [for a particular building]."

After gaining experience working with several contemporary designers, Platner established his own firm, Warren Platner Associates, in Connecticut in 1965, while continuing to work on the Ford Foundation Building in Manhattan. Designed by Kevin Roche and opened in 1967, the building was of steel, granite and glass construction, with a soaring central garden.

Platner's firm was composed purely of fully qualified architects, who he believed could manage any design task, whether it was interior planning or the architecture of a skyscraper: "Architects can do any design task, if they wish to do so."

One of Platner's first solo projects was the New York showroom for Georg Jensen, the high-end seller of Scandinavian furniture and lighting, called the Georg Jensen Design Centre. It opened in 1968.

Platner's design for Windows on the World, a restaurant atop the original One World Trade Center, which originally opened in 1976, is well known. Mimicking the interior of a grand ocean liner, the main dining room was elaborately terraced to provide views for every table, intimate seating and a sense of drama. Paul Goldberger, architecture critic of The New York Times at the time, described the restaurant's lush interior, with its soft pastels, fabric-covered walls and what seemed like miles of brass railings, as an example of "sensuous modernism".

Platner, who also created lighting fixtures, floor and window coverings, furniture and architectural ornaments for clients, completed many other noteworthy projects, including the interior design of Water Tower Place, the vertical shopping mall that opened in Chicago in 1976, and the 1986 renovation of the Pan Am Building lobby for its new owner, MetLife.

Warren Platner was inducted into Interior Design magazine's hall of fame in 1985.

== Personal life and death ==
Platner was married to the former Joyce Payne. The couple had four children. Among their grandchildren is Graham Platner, who won the Democratic nomination in the 2026 United States Senate election in Maine before withdrawing amidst scandal.

Until falling ill, Platner was still active in his firm, working on projects which included a new shopping centre in Greece. He died from meningitis at a hospital in New Haven, Connecticut, on April 17, 2006, at the age of 86.
