= John Andrews (Maine politician) =

Maine state representative

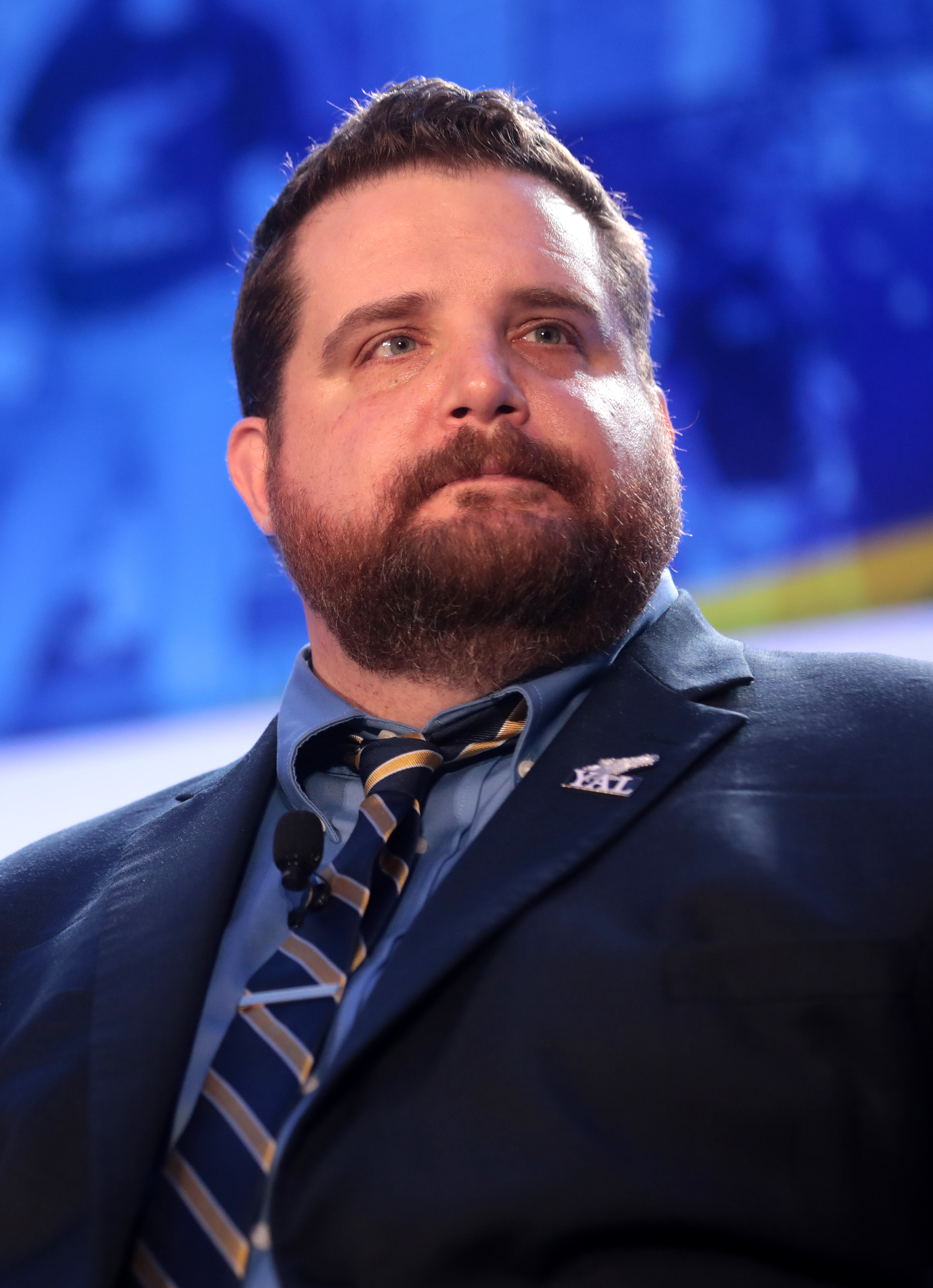
- Andrews in 2019

Member of the Maine House of Representatives from the 79th district
- In office December 8, 2022 – June 12, 2024
- Preceded by: Timothy Theriault
- Succeeded by: Michael Lance

Member of the Maine House of Representatives from the 73rd district
- In office December 5, 2018 – December 8, 2022
- Preceded by: Lloyd Herrick
- Succeeded by: Mike Soboleski

Personal details
- Party: Republican (before 2020; 2022–present)
- Other political affiliations: Libertarian (2020–2022)
- Spouse: Jeannette Andrews
- Children: 2
- Education: University of New Hampshire (BA)
- Website: Legislative website; Campaign website

John Andrews is an American politician who served as a Representative in the Maine House of Representatives from 2018 to 2024. He was first elected as a Republican to the 73rd district, but became a Libertarian in 2020 due to his dissatisfaction with the house committee assignments given to him. Andrews rejoined the Republican Party in 2022. Due to redistricting, he ran as a Republican in 2022 for Maine House district 79 and was re-elected.

== Maine House of Representatives ==
Elected in 2018 as a Republican, he switched to the Libertarian Party shortly after being re-elected in 2020—becoming the first Libertarian to serve in either chamber of the Maine Legislature—due to dissatisfaction with the committee assignments given to him by his floor leader. Andrews rejoined the Republicans in 2022, citing the removal of the Libertarian Party of Maine as an officially recognized party in the state.

Andrews resigned from the Maine House in June 2024, expressing frustration with the results of the June 11 primary election for Maine's 2nd congressional district.

== Personal life ==
Andrews lives in Paris, Maine with his wife, Jeannette Andrews, and his two children. In 2001 he graduated with a B.A. from the University of New Hampshire.

== Electoral history ==
2018 Maine House of Representatives Republican primary, District 73
Party	Candidate	Votes	%
Republican	John Andrews	582	84.2
Blank ballots		109	15.8
Total votes		691	100%

2018 Maine House of Representatives election, District 73
Party	Candidate	Votes	%
Republican	John Andrews	2,054	56.1
Democratic	Robert Faunce	1,466	40.0
Blank ballots		144	3.9
Total votes		3,664	100%
Republican hold			

2020 Maine House of Representatives Republican primary, District 73
Party	Candidate	Votes	%
Republican	John Andrews (incumbent)	619	90.0
Blank ballots		69	10.0
Total votes		688	100%

2020 Maine House of Representatives election, District 73
Party	Candidate	Votes	%
Republican	John Andrews (incumbent)	2,896	60.5
Democratic	Joshua Woodburn	1,640	34.2
Blank ballots		253	5.3
Total votes		4,789	100%
Republican hold			
