= Morris Katz (political strategist) =

American political strategist (born 1999)

- Katz in 2026
- Born: Morris Akiba Katz; May 18, 1999 (age 27); New York, New York, U.S.
- Political party: Democratic

Morris Akiba Katz (born May 18, 1999) is an American political strategist known for working for the campaign for Zohran Mamdani in the 2025 New York City mayoral election. He was deputy media consultant for John Fetterman's 2022 Senate election campaign, and later worked for Dan Osborn's campaign in the 2024 Senate election in Nebraska. He is a close advisor of Mamdani and Graham Platner, the replaced Democratic candidate in the 2026 Senate election in Maine, and helped create the candidates' viral campaign videos.

== Early life and education ==
Morris Katz was born in 1999 in the Tribeca neighborhood of New York City. Katz was raised in a Jewish family, the son of children's book author Julie Merberg and screenwriter David Bar Katz. His father was a writer on the 2022 T.V. series American Gigolo, a writer and producer on Ray Donovan, and a collaborator with John Leguizamo on film and in theater. His godfather was actor Philip Seymour Hoffman.

In middle school, his father introduced him to Melissa DeRosa, who would later become a senior advisor to New York state governor Andrew Cuomo, telling her that Morris was interested in politics. Morris has stated that he told her to "hav[e] the governor stop blocking the mayor's attempt to raise the minimum wage and pass universal pre-K", though DeRosa has refuted this, saying that, "There's absolutely no way it's true he said that. I would remember." Morris attended Beacon High School, a selective public school in New York. While there, he wrote six screenplays before graduating; a teacher from the school recollected Katz as smart, though that "he did not give off political genius vibes at 17." He attended Skidmore College, during this time volunteering for Tedra Cobb, Democratic candidate in the 2018 House of Representatives elections in New York, who lost. Katz dropped out of college during the second semester of his sophomore year.

== Career ==
After dropping out of college, he entered the entertainment industry. He worked as a production assistant and wrote plays and screenplays. He wrote a profile of Erica D. Smith, who was running in the Democratic primary for the 2022 United States Senate election in North Carolina. Smith reached out to him after reading the piece and asked for him to join her campaign where he worked on advertisements and videos. Afterwards he moved to Pennsylvania to work as a deputy media consultant for Fetterman's 2022 senatorial campaign against Mehmet Oz. During the campaign he viewed hundreds of hours of Oz's show and bought his supplements to search for material to use for Fetterman's advertisements. He and three partners including Tommy McDonald and Rebecca Katz, all veterans of the Bernie Sanders and John Fetterman campaigns, founded the political consulting firm Fight Agency.

In 2024, Katz was an advisor for Dan Osborn who was defeated by incumbent Nebraska Republican Senator Deb Fischer, moving to Omaha to do so. Katz was credited by a colleague from this campaign for "creat[ing] the Osborn brand." The campaign outraised and outspent the Republican incumbent candidate Deb Fischer by $6 million, and Osborn lost by just over 6 points.

In 2025, Katz was a top advisor to Zohran Mamdani during his campaign for mayor of New York City. While Katz and Mamdani shared similar backgrounds, Katz was persuaded to join Mamdani by his ideas on economic inequality. He conceived themed television advertisements for the campaign including ones based on Law & Order, The Golden Bachelor, and New York Knicks games. Though Katz's main work was making advertisements for the campaign, he also brokered conversations with political leaders, and particularly with Jewish leaders who were skeptical of Mamdani. Mamdani's campaign began by polling in the single digits, led to his victory in the Democratic mayoral primary by 13 points. Following Mamdani's victory in the general election, Katz commented to NPR on the hesitation of many in the Democratic Party to endorse him stating that "anyone who's scared to congratulate Zohran publicly or privately is very unlikely to be the nominee for president in 2028."

In 2025, Katz identified and approached Graham Platner to run for Senate, as Platner has acknowledged. Katz was looking for "working class" veterans to run against Susan Collins in the 2026 United States Senate election in Maine. He also served as a close advisor to Platner. Until late 2025, Katz lied about his age, representing himself as two years older than he actually was.

In 2026, Katz worked as an advisor for Elif Eralp in the race for mayor of Berlin in the 2026 Berlin state election. Eralp won the popular vote with her party Die Linke, achieving a first for the party in the German capital.
