= Rebecca Jauch =

American politician

Member of the Maine House of Representatives from the 51st district
- In office December 7, 2022 – May 5, 2024
- Preceded by: Joyce McCreight
- Succeeded by: Rafael Macias

Personal details
- Party: Democratic
- Spouse: Matthew
- Children: 2
- Education: Bachelor of Arts
- Website: https://jauch.mainecandidate.com/

Military service
- Allegiance: United States
- Branch/service: California Army National Guard

Rebecca "Becky" Jauch is an American politician who served as a member of the Maine House of Representatives from 2022 to 2024. She represented Maine's 51st House district.

== Electoral history ==
She was elected on November 8, 2022, in the 2022 Maine House of Representatives election. She assumed office on December 7, 2022.

Jauch resigned in May 2024 in order to accept a position with the National Marine Fisheries Service.

== Biography ==
Jauch earned a Bachelor of Arts in criminology from the University of Southern Maine in 2003.

== Political Positions ==
Jauch introduced a bill expanding child care for working parents.

Maine House of Representatives
Preceded by Joyce McCreight	Member of the Maine House of Representatives; 2022–2024	Succeeded by Rafael Macias
