= Timothy Guerrette =

American politician

Member of the Maine House of Representatives from the 4th district
- Incumbent
- Assumed office December 7, 2022
- Preceded by: Patricia Hymanson

Personal details
- Party: Republican
- Profession: Firefighter

Timothy "Tim" Guerrette is an American politician who has served as a member of the Maine House of Representatives since December 7, 2022. He represents Maine's 4th House district. Outside of politics, he works as a firefighter and paramedic.

== Electoral history ==
He went for Maine State Senate seat 1 in the 2016 Maine Senate elections, and lost. He was elected to the house in the 2022 Maine House of Representatives election.

Maine House of Representatives
Preceded by Patricia Hymanson	Member of the Maine House of Representatives; 2022–present	Succeeded by incumbent
