= Kevin O'Connell (politician) =

American politician

Member of the Maine House of Representatives: 128th district (2020–2022); 20th district (2022–2024)
- In office March 3, 2020 – March 3, 2024
- Preceded by: Arthur Verow
- Succeeded by: Dani L. O'Halloran

Personal details
- Party: Democratic

Kevin J. M. O'Connell is an American politician who served as a member of the Maine House of Representatives from 2020 to 2024. He is a member of the Democratic Party.

== Career ==
O'Connell has been an Emera Maine lineworker for over thirty years. He was also a member of the Maine Air National Guard for twenty-four years, and his service included time in Iraq. O'Connell is a member of IBEW Local #1837.

=== Politics ===
O'Connell served as mayor of Brewer, Maine in 2013 and 2017. He also served on the Brewer city council and school board at various times.

O'Connell ran in a special election for the 128th district in the Maine House of Representatives to fill the remainder of Democrat Arthur Verow's term, who had died on December 19, 2019, of a heart attack. He won the election, held on March 3, 2020, against Republican Garrel Craig, a former member of the House who had previously held that seat from 2016–2018. O'Connell defeated Craig in a rematch for the regularly scheduled 2020 election.

In 2022, O'Connell ran in the redrawn 20th district, narrowly winning another term against Republican Jennifer Morin.

In the legislature, O'Connell has advocated for restricting the practice of child marriage in Maine. He first introduced a bill to restrict child marriage in 2021, though it failed to pass the Maine Senate. In 2023, he again introduced legislation to raise the marriage age to 18, but the bill was modified to only raise the age to 17 before being passed by both chambers. O'Connell has stated that he would like to eventually see the age raised to 18.

O'Connell did not run for a third term in 2024, and was succeeded as representative for the 20th District by fellow Democrat Dani L. O'Halloran.

== Personal life ==
O'Connell is a lifelong resident of Brewer, Maine.

== Electoral history ==
2020 Maine's 128th House of Representatives district special election
Party	Candidate	Votes	%
Democratic	Kevin O'Connell	1,404	57.99
Republican	Garrel Craig	1,017	42.01
Total votes		2,421	100.0

2020 Maine's 128th House of Representatives district Democratic primary
Party	Candidate	Votes	%
Democratic	Kevin O'Connell (incumbent)	728	100.0
Total votes		728	100.0

2020 Maine's 128th House of Representatives district election
Party	Candidate	Votes	%
Democratic	Kevin O'Connell (incumbent)	2,598	54.89
Republican	Garrel Craig	2,135	45.11
Total votes		4,733	100.0

2022 Maine's 20th House of Representatives district Democratic primary
Party	Candidate	Votes	%
Democratic	Kevin O'Connell (incumbent)	205	100.0
Total votes		205	100.0

2022 Maine's 20th House of Representatives district election
Party	Candidate	Votes	%
Democratic	Kevin O'Connell (incumbent)	2,057	50.65
Republican	Jennifer Morin	2,004	49.35
Total votes		4,061	100.0

== See also ==
- List of mayors of Brewer, Maine
