= Graham Platner =

American former political candidate (born 1984)

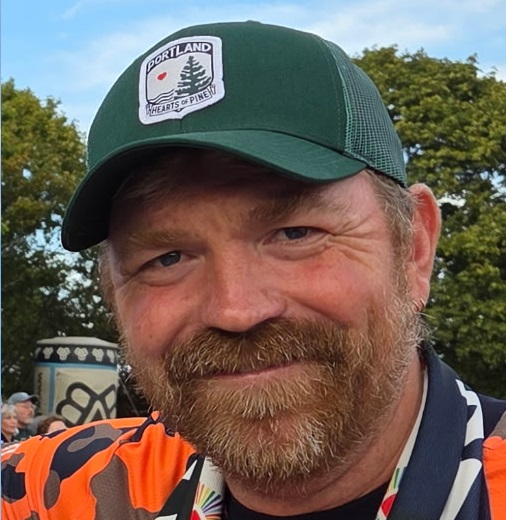
- Platner in 2025
- Born: Graham Cunningham Platner; September 1, 1984 (age 42); Blue Hill, Maine, U.S.
- Political party: Democratic
- Spouse: Amy Gertner (m. 2023)
- Relatives: Warren Platner (grandfather)
- Military career
- Branch: United States Marine Corps; Maryland Army National Guard
- Service years: 2003–2007; 2010–2011
- Rank: Sergeant
- Conflicts: Iraq War; War in Afghanistan
- Website: Campaign website

Graham Cunningham Platner (born September 1, 1984) is an American Marine Corps veteran and former political candidate. He was the Democratic nominee in the 2026 US Senate election in Maine until he ended his campaign in July.

Born and raised in coastal Maine, Platner enlisted in the Marine Corps after graduating from high school. He served eight years, including three combat tours in Iraq as a Marine and one in Afghanistan with the Maryland Army National Guard. After his military service, he worked as a security contractor in Afghanistan before returning to Maine and entering the oyster farming business. From there, he took over an operation in 2020 and became active in local government before announcing his candidacy for the US Senate in August 2025.

Platner has been described as a populist and a progressive critical of the Democratic establishment. His platform focused on issues such as housing affordability, universal health care, strengthening labor unions, reducing the political power of billionaires, and ending US involvement in what he calls "pointless" wars.

Platner's candidacy was marked by several controversies, including past statements on Reddit, a Nazi-era Totenkopf tattoo on his chest, and alleged misconduct in romantic relationships, including a history of sexting several women during his marriage and physically threatening and disturbing behavior toward past romantic partners. In July 2026, a former girlfriend accused Platner of raping her, after which several elected Democrats and the Maine Democratic Party rescinded their endorsements and called for him to end his campaign. He suspended his campaign days later while denying all allegations of rape and abuse, and withdrew from the race on July 10.

== Early life ==
Graham Platner was born on September 1, 1984, in Blue Hill, Maine. He was raised in Sullivan, a coastal town near Acadia National Park, and in Ellsworth. He is the elder of two sons born to upscale restaurant owner Leslie Harlow and lawyer Bronson Platner. Platner's parents separated when he was six. His grandfather, Warren Platner, was a modernist architect who designed interiors for the Ford Foundation and Windows on the World, the restaurant atop the old World Trade Center.

In 1999, Platner spent a semester at the Hotchkiss School, a boarding school in Lakeville, Connecticut, until he was expelled. He resumed his education as a day student at John Bapst Memorial High School, a college-preparatory school in Bangor, Maine. After graduating from high school, Platner took a gap year in 2003 to backpack through Europe and Africa and work on the Appalachian Trail.

== Career ==
=== Military ===
Platner enlisted in the Marine Corps after graduating from high school in 2003. He attended the Marine Corps School of Infantry, then deployed to Iraq in 2005. He served a total of eight years in the military, including three combat tours in Iraq, in areas including Ramadi and Fallujah. In 2025, when asked why he served in the Iraq War after protesting it, Platner said, "I thought I could do some good. And I wanted to play soldier. I might have read too much Hemingway."

After four years in the military, Platner enrolled at George Washington University (GWU), funded by the G.I. Bill. Shortly after starting school, he enlisted in the National Guard and served an additional tour of duty in the war in Afghanistan. He returned to Washington in 2011, resuming classes at GWU and working as a bartender at the Tune Inn on Capitol Hill. From 2011 to 2016 he alternated between living in DC and military deployments, before withdrawing from GWU and returning to Maine in 2016 for treatment of post-traumatic stress disorder and other military-related injuries.

In 2018, Platner returned to Kabul, Afghanistan, for about six months as a State Department security contractor with Constellis, where he provided diplomatic security to the US Ambassador to Afghanistan. He returned to Maine the same year, saying he had quickly grown more disillusioned with the military and what he called fraudulent funneling of taxpayer money to private defense companies.

=== Oyster farming ===
While on leave from Afghanistan in 2018, Platner spent two weeks farming oysters with Jock Crothers, founder of Waukeag Neck Oyster Co., a small Frenchman Bay operation established in 2010 that supplies restaurants in Downeast Maine. Platner has said he was "miserable" working as a security contractor, and his mother devised a plan to bring him back to Maine with the help of a family friend who owned the farm; Platner has said the business "fell into my lap". After resigning as a security contractor and returning to Maine later that year, he began working at the farm full-time. He took over the company in 2020, and as of 2025 owns and operates it with his wife, Amy, and another business partner. He says the business does not make much money, and his mother's restaurant is his biggest customer. He supplements his income with benefits he earns as a 100% disabled veteran. Platner also runs a mooring and dive service.

=== Local government and community involvement ===
Platner was Sullivan's harbormaster and the chair of Sullivan's planning board. He has also been involved in grassroots organizing, leading political efforts with the Acadia Action activist group. In 2022, he publicly opposed a proposition that would have imposed a moratorium on aquaculture, asserting at the town meeting where the vote was held that despite being aimed at "industrial scale" operations, the wording of the moratorium would have swept up many smaller businesses, including his own; the proposition failed in that meeting.

== U.S. Senate campaign ==
Platner's campaign logo

In July 2025, a coalition of labor and community groups approached Platner to suggest he consider running for Senate. He has said his first reaction was to reject the idea, but that he reconsidered it with his wife when the group returned with a detailed plan.

Candidate vetting, standard practice in many US elections, often takes weeks and tens of thousands of dollars to complete. Democratic strategist and Platner staffer Daniel Moraff paid $6,250 for a background check on Platner, which took three days.

Platner launched his Senate campaign on August 19, 2025, with a video produced by Morris Katz, a senior adviser and ad maker for New York City mayor Zohran Mamdani. In the video, Platner highlighted his military and working-class credentials and criticized incumbent Republican Susan Collins in harsh terms:

I did four infantry tours in the Marine Corps and the Army. I'm not afraid to name an enemy. And the enemy is the oligarchy. It's the billionaires who pay for it, and the politicians who sell us out. And yeah, that means politicians like Susan Collins.

This video received 2.5 million views in its first 24 hours, sparking national media attention. The campaign raised $1 million in its first nine days, and reported amassing over 2,700 volunteers.

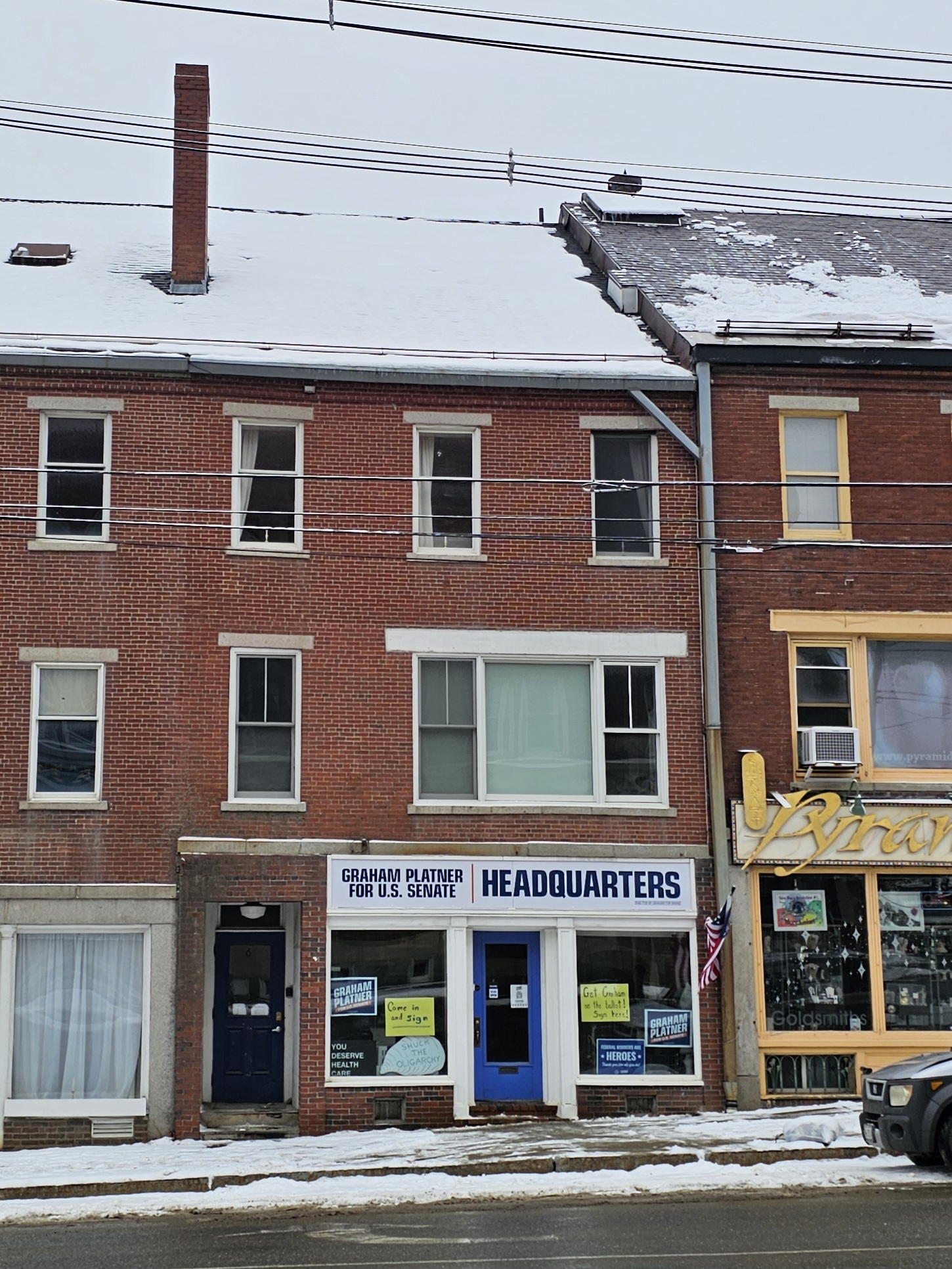
Platner's campaign headquarters in Ellsworth, Maine

Senator Bernie Sanders endorsed Platner on August 30, ahead of a Fighting Oligarchy tour appearance in Portland with Platner and Maine gubernatorial candidate Troy Jackson. The event was originally scheduled to be held in an auditorium but had to be moved to a much larger arena due to high public interest. Platner was also endorsed by Senators Ruben Gallego, Martin Heinrich, and Elizabeth Warren; and Representative Ro Khanna. He was also endorsed by the International Federation of Professional and Technical Engineers, Maine State Nurses Association, and United Auto Workers.

Platner's campaign reported that more than 800 people attended his first town hall meeting in Ellsworth, and that by September 2025 over 6,000 volunteers had joined since his August candidacy announcement. Platner's volunteer network canvassed against Maine's Question 1, a 2025 ballot measure to restrict absentee voting and require photo identification that was defeated.

In late October and early November 2025, several high-level staffers left Platner's campaign during a period that coincided with media reporting on his past controversial Reddit posts. On October 17, Platner's political director, Genevieve McDonald, resigned. Platner offered her $15,000 in severance pay if she signed an NDA, but she refused the offer. On October 27, Platner's campaign manager, Kevin Brown, resigned, citing family reasons. On October 31, Platner's campaign finance director, Ronald Holmes, resigned. Also on October 31, Platner filed paperwork with the Federal Election Commission indicating that Victoria Perrone was no longer his treasurer and Ben Martelo would take her place. On November 7, Platner hired Ben Chin as his new campaign manager. Chin is the deputy director of the Maine People's Alliance, a progressive advocacy organization.

Politico wrote that Platner "embodies a quarter-century of raw American frustration", and The Washington Post described his candidacy as one of several "rugged guy" campaigns in 2026, along with Dan Osborn's Senate campaign in Nebraska and Nathan Sage's in Iowa. By March 2026, Platner had a significant polling lead and fundraising advantage over his primary opponent, Maine governor Janet Mills. Mills suspended her campaign on April 30. With Mills having suspended her campaign and no major opposition remaining, Platner won the June Democratic primary with 72% of the vote. His vote count set a record for a Maine Democratic primary for US Senate, exceeding Sara Gideon's in 2020 by over 40,000 votes.

=== Campaign controversies ===
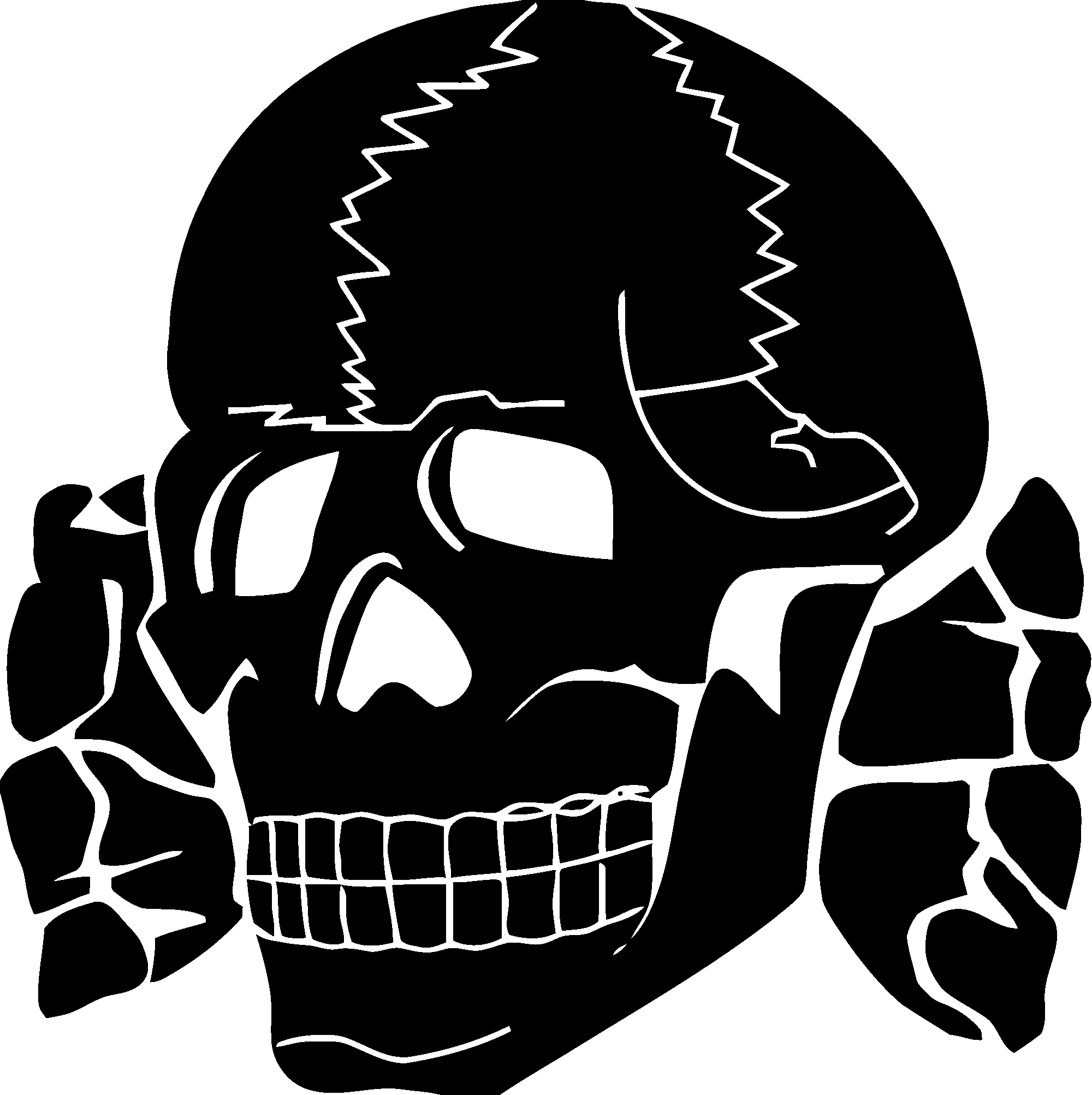
A Totenkopf

In October 2025, various news outlets reported on Reddit posts Platner made between 2013 and 2021 in which he called himself a "communist", wrote that "all cops are bastards", agreed with a post calling rural white Americans "racist and stupid", and advocated political violence and armed resistance. In a 2013 Reddit discussion about a video promoting anti-rape underwear, Platner wrote: "Rape is a real thing. If you're so worried about it to buy Kevlar underwear you'd think you might not get blacked out f----d up around people you aren't comfortable with." He apologized for the posts in an interview with CNN, attributing them to his struggles with PTSD.

More controversy arose over a January 2020 Reddit post in which Platner responded to a question asking why he had joined the Marines by writing: "I wanted to have an adventure and kill some people." Platner denounced his past actions and the American invasions of Iraq and Afghanistan in an April 2026 interview, saying that he had "come to grips with the fact that the violence I took part in effectively had no purpose, or it had no benefit for the United States. I don't think that the war in Iraq did anything good for the American people". He said he was disgusted by "a political system which, in many ways, does not care about the human cost of war, whether on our side or the violence that we dole out to civilian populations and the countries we go fight these wars in."

During his 2026 Senate campaign, Platner faced scrutiny over a tattoo on his chest of the Totenkopf symbol used by the Nazi Schutzstaffel (SS) and SS-Totenkopfverbände. In an interview on Pod Save America, Platner said he and other Marines received the tattoo while on leave in Croatia in 2007 and that he was unaware of its historical association at the time. He later covered the tattoo. CNN and Jewish Insider reported a former acquaintance's allegation that Platner had previously called the tattoo "my Totenkopf", which Platner denied. A former girlfriend and conservative activist interviewed by The New York Times in June 2026 also said he had called the tattoo "my Totenkopf" years before launching his campaign. A Marine who got a tattoo matching Platner's told Zeteo in June 2026 that he and Platner did not deliberately choose Nazi symbols, saying, "We just got matching skull-and-crossbone tattoos that we thought looked cool."

On May 30, 2026, The New York Times and other news outlets reported that in 2025, Platner's wife, Amy Gertner, told a senior campaign aide that Platner had been sexting with multiple other women. The Platner campaign's political director, Genevieve McDonald, alleged that Gertner had said Platner had sexted as many as a dozen women. A Platner campaign official said he had been communicating with no more than six, and that the conduct had stopped before the campaign launched. Gertner said the matter had been resolved through counseling.

Platner has drawn criticism for online activity and media appearances during the campaign. In February 2026, he briefly shared a tweet by antisemitic alt-right commentator Stew Peters before deleting it, saying he had not realized Peters was the original source. On a podcast hosted by antisemitic conspiracy theorist Nate Cornacchia, Platner said he was a "longtime fan" of the show.

=== Withdrawal ===
After sexual misconduct allegations against Platner surfaced, Senator Ruben Gallego and Representative Ro Khanna rescinded their endorsements of him, and the Maine Democratic Party released a statement calling on Platner to suspend his campaign. Soon, every senator who had endorsed Platner, including Bernie Sanders and Elizabeth Warren, rescinded their endorsements and called on him to end his campaign, as did Track AIPAC, the Democratic Senatorial Campaign Committee and End Citizens United. Senate Democratic leader Chuck Schumer and Democratic Senatorial Campaign Committee chair Kirsten Gillibrand rescinded their endorsements and said the DSCC would not invest in the race as long as Platner remained the nominee.

On July 8, Platner unofficially declared that he had ended his campaign. In a video posted on X, he said the accusations against him were false and that corporate media and the Democratic establishment were "using these allegations to take away all of the things we need to run a campaign". He said the candidate who replaced him in the election should be nominated in a manner that is "open, transparent and democratic. It needs to be reflecting the will and the values of the people that built this movement." Platner formally withdrew from the race on July 10.

Various former candidates from the Democratic Party announced their intention to run for the nomination to face incumbent senator Susan Collins in the 2026 general election. Troy Jackson consolidated support after numerous candidates dropped out on July 19.

== Allegations of rape and other sexual misconduct ==
On June 4, 2026, The New York Times reported allegations that Platner engaged in disturbing and physically threatening behavior toward women he had dated. Forty-year-old Lyndsey Fifield, whom the Times described as "a Virginia conservative who has worked for right-leaning groups and Republican campaigns", dated Platner from about 2013 to 2015 and alleged that Platner had grabbed her repeatedly with enough force to leave marks and once twisted her arm behind her back, pushed her into a room, and locked her in against her will until morning. Platner's campaign said he "strongly disputes" any claims of physical intimidation.

On July 6, Politico published an account by a woman Platner had dated accusing him of raping her while he was drunk in late 2021. The accuser, 41-year-old Maine resident Jenny Racicot, said she had been reluctant to come forward in part because she agreed with Platner politically. Racicot said she felt compelled to speak out because the earlier allegations against Platner had been overshadowed by controversy over Fifield's ties to the Republican Party. According to Politico, Racicot described the alleged assault to another man whom she was dating in 2023, and warned an acquaintance on Facebook against becoming involved with Platner, years before he launched his political career. Politico also cited emails that Racicot exchanged with her therapist about the incident. Platner denied the accusation of rape, calling it a political attack to derail his campaign.

On July 7, The Washington Post reported that Fifield alleged Platner would take condoms off during sex without her consent. She said that when she confronted him during or after sex, he would make light of the situation. She claimed that Platner had done this about six times during their relationship.

== Political views ==
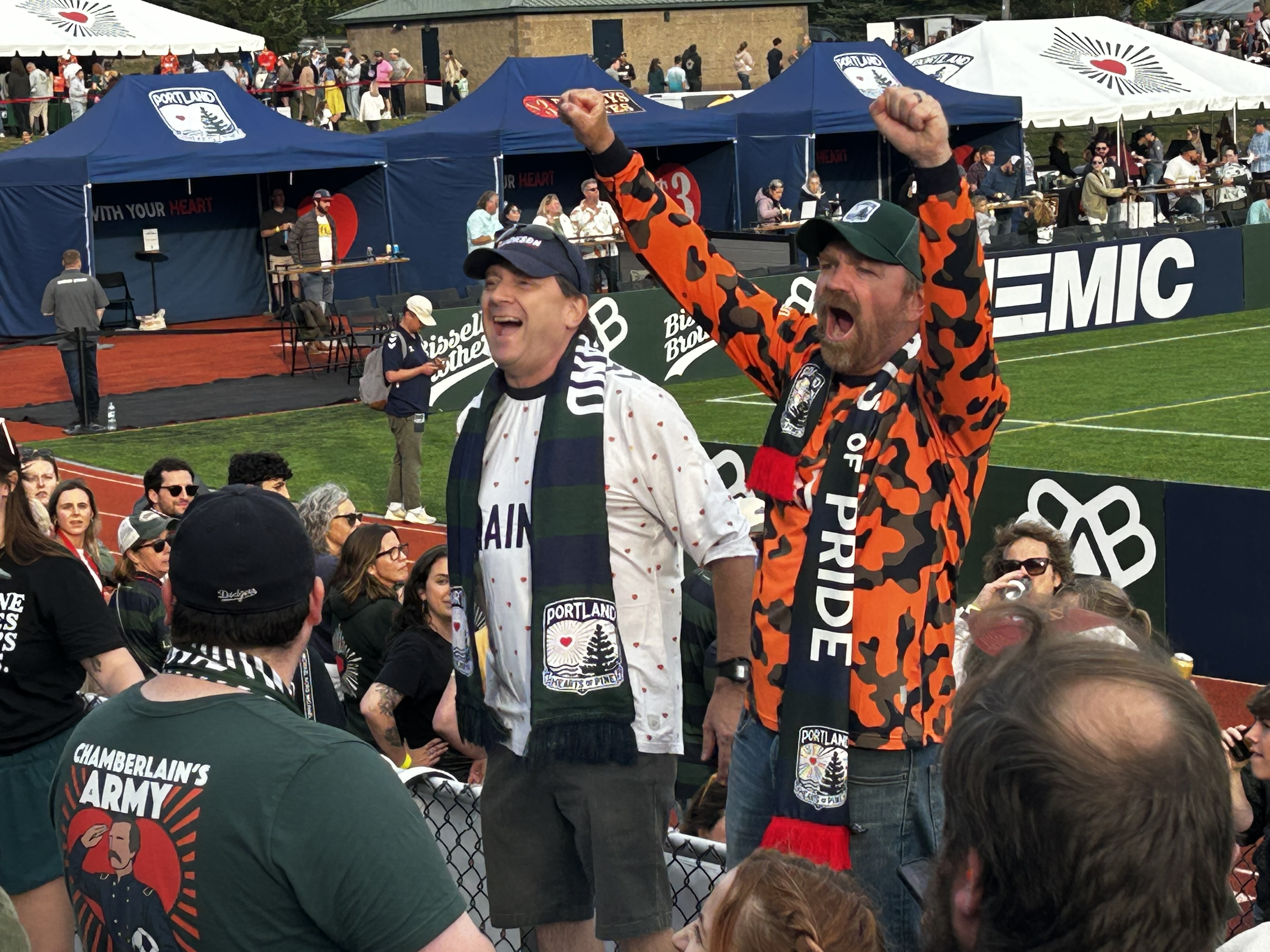
Platner campaigning with former Maine Senate president Troy Jackson, a Maine gubernatorial candidate in 2026, at a Portland Hearts of Pine match in September 2025

Platner has been described as a populist and a progressive. His platform focuses on issues such as housing affordability, strengthening labor unions, universal health care through Medicare for All, reducing the political power of billionaires, and ending US involvement in what he describes as "pointless" wars.

In The American Prospect, Austin Ahlman called Platner part of "a growing wave of populist Senate candidates who are challenging modern understandings of political labels by forefronting anti-establishment, anti-corporate, and distinctly localist politics and policies". Platner has cited Senator Bernie Sanders as a political influence and labor organizer Jane McAlevey as an inspiration.

Platner has explicitly declined to be identified as progressive or liberal, saying, "I think it's silly that thinking people deserve health care, that makes you some kind of lefty. But I do think those working-class policies are necessary." He said, "If I am any kind of Democrat, I'm a New Deal Democrat" and named Franklin D. Roosevelt's labor secretary, Frances Perkins, as an inspiration of his, praising her creation of Social Security, a "new" idea at that time. Platner has said that many of his friends and colleagues voted for Donald Trump.

Before running for office, Platner described himself on Reddit as a member of the Democratic Socialists of America who was "pretty radically left" and a "vegetable growing, psychedelics taking socialist" (in 2017) and "rabidly anti-Hillary [Clinton]" (in the 2016 Democratic presidential primaries). In a December 2025 interview with The New Yorker, he declined to call himself a socialist and described his political involvement before his campaign as "organizing around mostly local economic justice issues or social justice issues". Platner called the US an "oligarchy", arguing that billionaires and large corporations excessively influence its politics and economy.

Platner supports increasing taxes on billionaires and corporations, including a 5% annual wealth tax above $1 billion. The tax would apply to the estimated value of assets above that threshold rather than only to income. At a Labor Day rally headlined by Bernie Sanders, Platner said the political system had been "built by the political class to enrich and support billionaires on the backs of working people".

Platner vowed not to support Chuck Schumer as Senate Majority Leader if Democrats gain control of the Senate. Platner supports abolishing ICE, which he calls "the moderate position". Platner argued the Democratic Party is not doing enough to counter deportation in the second Trump administration. He called for the impeachment and removal of Supreme Court Justices Clarence Thomas and Samuel Alito, and supports increasing the number of seats on the court.

Platner has called the Gaza genocide "the ultimate moral test of our time." He has criticized AIPAC and pledged not to take campaign contributions from the organization, "or any group that supports the genocide in Gaza". Some Republicans and conservative outlets have called Platner "Maine's Mamdani." Platner opposes the 2026 Iran war, has called it a "horrific war of choice", and has said Pennsylvania Senator John Fetterman should be voted out for backing it.

Platner credits his military experience with forming his worldview. He has called US "military adventurism" a "mechanism of moving taxpayer dollars into the private bank accounts of defense companies, all on the backs of frankly working-class men and women, and on the backs of the people living in societies that we took the wars to". While critical of excessive military spending, Platner has advocated for supplying military aid to Ukraine during the Russo-Ukrainian war, saying, "I personally think that we should provide them with support." Platner has said his veterans' healthcare and disability benefits have enabled him to run his small business, and argues that all Americans should have access to increased social welfare, regardless of military service.

Platner supports red flag laws, provided they are "written in such a way that they don't impede the ability of legal gun owners to have access to their firearms". He also supports universal background checks, and opposes a ban on semi-automatic assault weapons, saying, "We need to have a much more holistic approach than simply banning types of guns that we already have uncountable numbers of in the United States".

Of LGBTQ rights, Platner has said, "I stand right in the fucking way of anyone who's going to try to come after the freedoms of the LGBTQIA+ community." At a May 2026 town hall, Platner said he had ranked Troy Jackson, Shenna Bellows, and Hannah Pingree, in that order, in the 2026 Democratic primary for governor of Maine.

== Personal life ==
Platner lives in Sullivan, Maine. He married Amy Gertner in the autumn of 2023. Gertner was an elementary and middle school art teacher until 2024, when she became the business manager for Waukeag Neck Oyster Co, which Platner has run since 2019. Platner is also a competitive pistol shooter and firearms instructor. His stepbrother, Seth Frantzman, is a senior Middle East correspondent and analyst at The Jerusalem Post. Platner has said that he is friends with members of the Israeli human rights organization B'Tselem.

In January 2026, after exploring options in the United States and finding them too expensive, Platner and his wife announced they would try to conceive a child through in vitro fertilization in Norway. In April, they announced that his wife had suffered a miscarriage.

== Electoral history ==
=== 2026 ===
2026 U.S. Senate election in Maine (Democratic primary)
| Party | Candidate | Votes | % |
|---|---|---|---|
| Democratic | Graham Platner | 156,084 | 72.1 |
| Democratic | Janet Mills (withdrawn) | 41,644 | 19.3 |
| Democratic | David Costello | 17,560 | 8.1 |
| Democratic | Andrea LaFlamme (write-in) | 1,114 | 0.5 |
| Total votes | | 216,402 | 100.0 |

Party political offices
| Preceded by Sara Gideon | Democratic nominee for U.S. Senator from Maine (Class 2); Withdrew; 2026 | Succeeded by Troy Jackson |
