= Maine's 73rd House of Representatives district =

American legislative district

Maine's 73rd State House of Representatives district
Representative
John Andrews; R–Paris

Maine's 73rd House of Representatives district in the United States is one of is one of 151 Maine House of Representatives districts. It covers part of Oxford County. The district is currently represented by John Andrews, a Republican.

== Towns represented ==
- Buckfield
- Hebron
- Paris

== Recent election results ==
=== 2018 ===
2018 Maine House of Representatives election, District 73
Party	Candidate	Votes	%
Republican	John Andrews	2,054	56.1
Democratic	Robert Faunce	1,466	40.0
Blank ballots		144	3.9
Total votes		3,664	100%
Republican hold			

=== 2020 ===
2020 Maine House of Representatives election, District 73
Party	Candidate	Votes	%
Republican	John Andrews (incumbent)	2,896	60.5
Democratic	Joshua Woodburn	1,640	34.2
Blank ballots		253	5.3
Total votes		4,789	100%
Republican hold			
