= Joyce McCreight =

American politician

Member of the Maine House of Representatives from the 51 district
- In office 2014–2022
- Succeeded by: Rebecca Jauch

Personal details
- Party: Democratic
- Education: College of Wooster, University of Southern Maine

Joyce "Jay" McCreight (née Edwards) is an American politician and social worker from Rochester, New York. She graduated from the College of Wooster with a BA in sociology and the University of Southern Maine with an MSEd in clinical counseling. McCreight was a social worker in the public school system of Portland, Maine for 20 years.

== Political career ==
McCreight served 4 terms in the Maine House of Representatives. She represented Maine's 51st district from 2014 to 2022. During her time in office McCreight advocated for expanding access to reproductive health care. She also served as the house chair of the Marine Resources Committee from 2019–2022.

== Electoral history ==
General election for Maine House of Representatives District 51, 2020
Party	Candidate	Votes	%
Democratic	Joyce McCreight	3,705	58.2%
Republican	Stephen Davis	2,663	41.8%

General election for Maine House of Representatives District 51, 2018
Party	Candidate	Votes	%
Democratic	Joyce McCreight	3,115	60.8%
Republican	Sean Hall	2,008	39.2%

General election for Maine House of Representatives District 51, 2016
Party	Candidate	Votes	%
Democratic	Joyce McCreight		

General election for Maine House of Representatives District 51, 2014
Party	Candidate	Votes	%
Democratic	Joyce McCreight	3,577	51.1%
Republican	Byron Watson	2,258	44.8%
None	Blank Votes	208	4.1%
