= Genevieve McDonald =

American politician

Member of the Maine House of Representatives from the 134th district
- In office December 5, 2018 – May 10, 2022
- Preceded by: Walter Kumiega
- Succeeded by: Holly Eaton

Personal details
- Born: 1982 (age 43–44)
- Party: Democratic

Genevieve Kurilec McDonald (born 1982) is an American Democratic politician, lobster boat captain, and fisheries advocate from Maine. McDonald represented House District #134: Cranberry Isles, Deer Isle, Frenchboro, Isle au Haut, North Haven, Southwest Harbor, Stonington, Swan's Island, Tremont, Vinalhaven, and Marshall Island. In 2013, she successfully led a social media campaign to prompt fishing gear producer Grundéns to produce commercial fishing gear for women. In June 2014, McDonald became the first woman to serve on the Maine Department of Marine Resources Lobster Advisory Council (LAC). McDonald resigned her House seat effective on May 10, 2022, the day after the last Legislative Day of the Second (and final) Regular Session of the 130th Maine Legislature.

== Early life and education ==
McDonald was born in 1982 in Bar Harbor.

McDonald enrolled in the University of Maine in 2013, graduating in May 2018 with a Bachelor of Arts in university studies with a minor in Maine studies, explaining that by enrolling she "wanted to be able to better facilitate communication between the commercial fishing industry and the scientific community."

In June 2014, McDonald was appointed the Down East region's representative to the Maine Department of Marine Resources Lobster Advisory Council (LAC). She is the first woman to serve on the LAC.

== Women's fishing gear campaign ==
In 2013, McDonald, frustrated with constantly having to modify ― and therefore compromise the effectiveness of ― her "unisex" fishing gear for a better fit, began a social media campaign to connect women fishermen and help them put pressure on manufacturers to produce better-fitting gear for women. When she met a representative from leading fishing gear company Grundéns USA at a trade show and inquired about production of women's gear, he abruptly dismissed the suggestion. McDonald posted a recap of the incident on social media, which went viral. Through her "Chix Who Fish" Facebook group, McDonald collected over 1,000 photos of women fisherman from around the world and sent a presentation of their photos to Grundéns. The president of Grundéns USA reached out and sent her a prototype jacket from their upcoming Sedna gear line for women. In 2018, Eric Tietje, Grundéns global product director, credited McDonald's campaign, including her "Chix Who Fish" Facebook group, with inspiring the company's decision to launch the Sedna line.

== Maine House ==
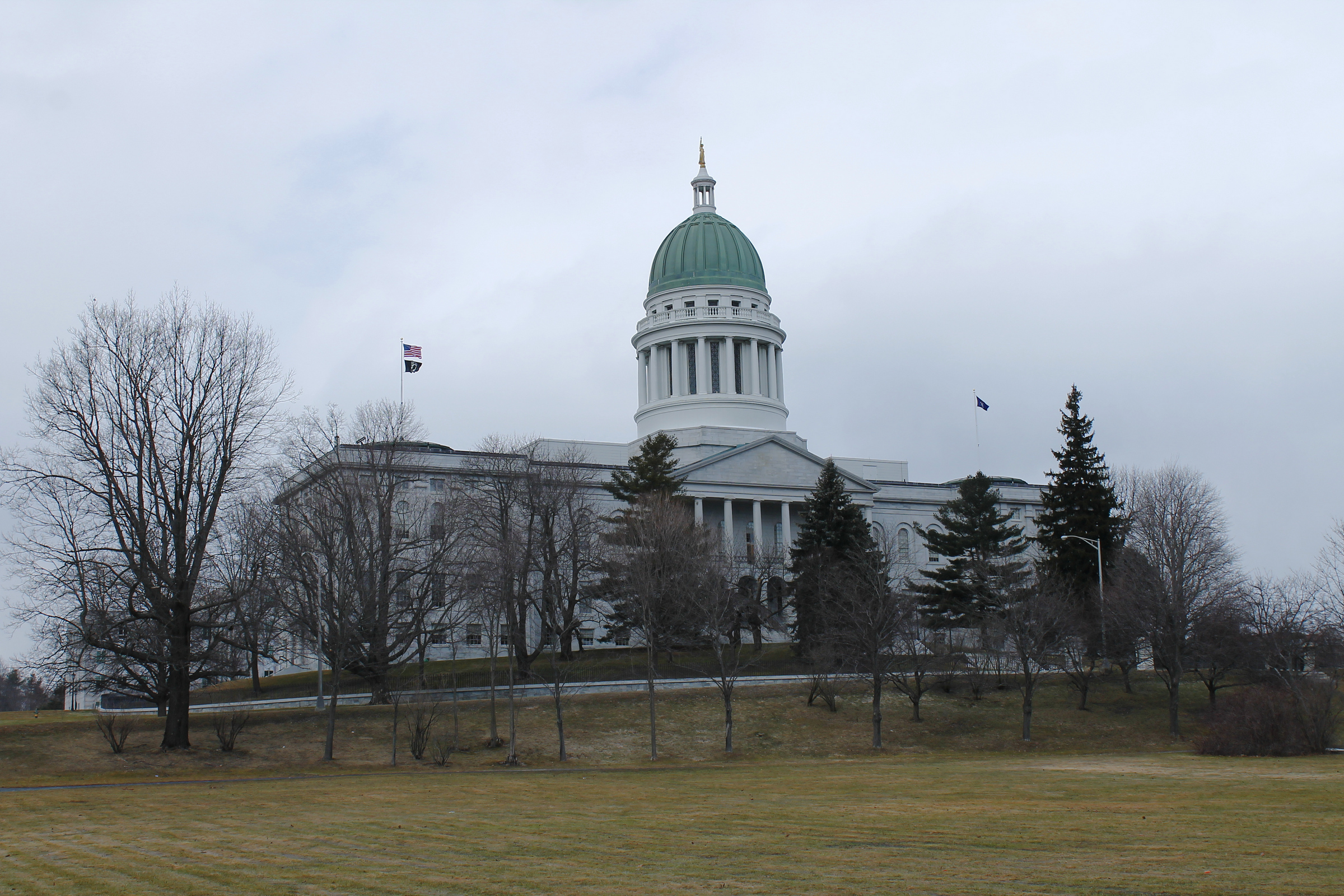
The Maine State Capitol

McDonald says she was inspired to run for the House after completing a Washington, D.C. travel course at the University of Maine, and also credits her tenure on the LAC with first introducing her to state-level advocacy. She announced her candidacy for Maine House District #134 in February 2018, filling a seat vacated by Walter Kumiega, who had termed out and approached her about running in his place. District #134 represents Maine's largest lobster ports and consists of waterfront towns and islands.

McDonald ran unopposed in the 2018 House District #134 Democratic primary and defeated Republican Philip Brady 67%-33% in the general election. During her first term, McDonald served on the Joint Standing Committee on Marine Resources and the Maine Climate Council Working Group on Community Resiliency, Emergency Planning and Public Health.

In January 2020, McDonald announced a re-election bid. She defeated fellow Democrat Julie Eaton 75%-25% in the District #134 primary and ran unopposed in the general election. In her second term she continued to serve on the Joint Standing Committee on Marine Resources and was assigned as the House chair of the Government Oversight Committee. In April 2021, McDonald was appointed to the Coastal and Marine Working Group of the Maine Climate Council.

McDonald announced her candidacy for Maine Senate District 7 in January 2022, but later withdrew her candidacy. She resigned her House seat on May 9, 2022.

=== Science–fishing relations ===
McDonald has described both improving the relationship between scientists and fishermen and addressing impacts of climate change on the fishing industry as two of her continued legislative priorities. She has strongly advocated for national policies that both protect the endangered North Atlantic right whale and protect Maine's lobster fisheries, and collaborates with scientists on the water whenever possible. McDonald is the fisheries liaison to the New England Aqua Ventus project, which has proposed a floating wind array off the coast of Maine.

=== Fishing industry support ===
In the aftermath of the COVID-19 pandemic, McDonald helped many of her fellow fishermen secure Paycheck Protection Program loans and access Pandemic Unemployment Assistance to help weather financial losses. McDonald also planned to provide guidance to lobstermen applying for the Seafood Trade Relief Grant.

In late June 2020, McDonald drew attention for correcting several of then-president Donald Trump's tweets regarding his administration's contributions to Maine's fishing industry.

== 2026 U.S. Senate election in Maine ==
Following McDonald's resignation from the state House, she became a consultant with Preti Strategies. McDonald became the political director for Graham Platner's campaign for the 2026 United States Senate election in Maine following Platner's August 2025 campaign launch. McDonald resigned on 17 October 2025 after past statements made by Platner on Reddit were reported, writing in her resignation letter that Platner's statements "were not known to me when I agreed to join the campaign, and they are not words or values I can stand behind in a candidate". Some of the statements made by Platner included referring to police as "bastards", asking why Black people did not tip, and a comment that people concerned about being raped should "take some responsibility for themselves and not get so fucked up".

In May 2026, McDonald leaked texts she received from Platner's wife to The Wall Street Journal, revealing that Platner had sent sexual messages to women during their marriage. Platner's wife said she was "deeply hurt" by the leaks.

== Personal life ==
McDonald married her husband in September 2012 and they live in Stonington with their two daughters.

In 2019, Belfast artist Susan Tobey White included McDonald with a dozen other women fishermen in a series of paintings titled "Lobstering Women of Maine."

== Electoral history ==
2018 Maine House District 134 Democratic Primary
Party	Candidate	Votes	%
Democratic	Genevieve McDonald	1,034	100%
Total votes		1,034	100.0%

2018 Maine House District 134 General Election
Party	Candidate	Votes	%
Democratic	Genevieve McDonald	3,111	66.8%
Republican	Philip Brady	1,547	33.2%
Total votes		4,658	100.0%

2020 Maine House District 134 Democratic Primary
Party	Candidate	Votes	%
Democratic	Genevieve McDonald	1,246	75.1%
Democratic	Julie Eaton	414	24.9%
Total votes		1,660	100.0%

2020 Maine House District 134 General Election
Party	Candidate	Votes	%
Democratic	Genevieve McDonald	4,445	100.0%
Total votes		4,445	100.0%
