= Patricia Hymanson =

American neurologist

Member of the Maine House of Representatives from the 4th district
- In office December 3, 2014 – December 7, 2022
- Succeeded by: Timothy Guerrette

Personal details
- Party: Democratic
- Children: 3
- Education: Yale University; New York Medical College
- Profession: Neurologist
- Website: legislature.maine.gov/house/house/MemberProfiles/Details/92

Patricia Hymanson is an American physician and politician from Maine. Hymanson, a Democrat from York, Maine, has served in the Maine House of Representatives since December 2014. She has also served on the York School Committee, including as chair.

Hymanson is a practicing neurologist and has had a practice in York since 1988. Her district includes all of the town of Ogunquit, Maine as well portions of the towns of Wells, Sanford and her residence in York. Hymanson attended public schools in Yonkers, New York before earning a B.A. from Yale University and a M.D. from New York Medical College. She is Jewish.

In 2020, Hymanson sought her fourth consecutive term in the Maine House of Representatives.
