= Arthur Verow =

American politician (1942–2019)

Arthur C. Verow

Member of the Maine House of Representatives for the 21st District (Brewer)
- In office January 2019 – December 19, 2019
- Preceded by: Garrel Craig
- Succeeded by: Kevin O'Connell
- In office 2013–2017
- Succeeded by: Garrel Craig

Personal details
- Born: March 14, 1942 Old Town, Maine, U.S.
- Died: December 19, 2019 (aged 77) Bangor, Maine, U.S.
- Party: Democratic
- Education: Husson University

Arthur C. "Archie" Verow (March 14, 1942 – December 19, 2019) was an American politician from Maine.

Verow was born in Old Town, Maine. He graduated from Husson University in 1966. A Democrat, Verow served in the Maine House of Representatives since 2019, representing the 128th district. He previously served in the Maine House of Representatives from 2013 until 2017. He served as the mayor of Brewer, Maine. Verow died on December 19, 2019, after a heart attack, while still in office.
