= 2024 Maine House of Representatives election =

- November 5, 2024

All 151 seats in the Maine House of Representatives 76 seats needed for a majority
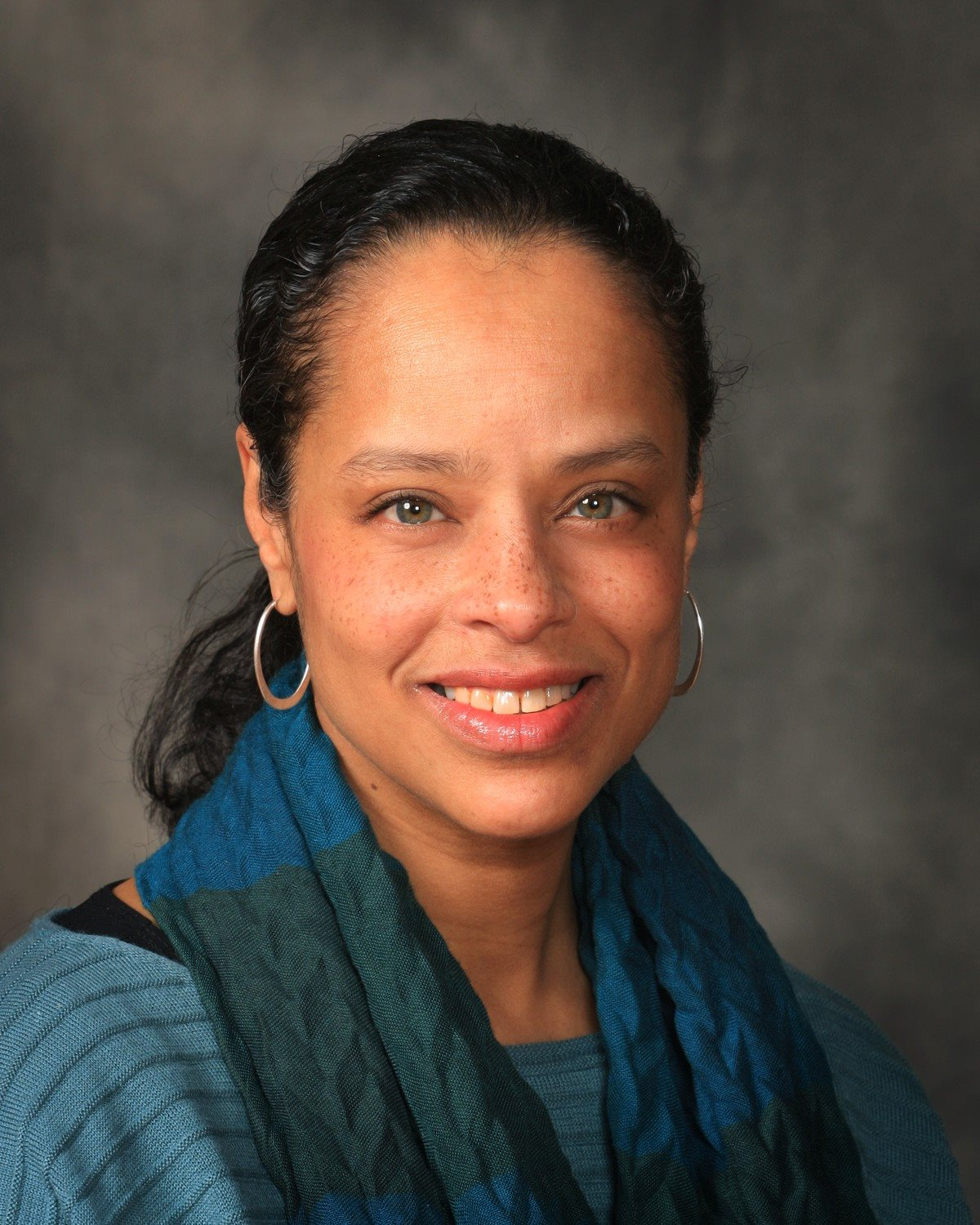

	Majority party	Minority party	Third party
Leader	Rachel Talbot Ross (term-limited)	Billy Bob Faulkingham	None
Party	Democratic	Republican	Independent
Leader's seat	108th	12th	None
Last election	82	67	2
Seats before	81	68	2
Seats won	76	73	2
Seat change	▼5	▲5	Steady
Popular vote	378,082	366,013	24,589
Percentage	49.19%	▲47.62%	▼2.92%
Swing	▼1.00 (pp)	▲1.746 (pp)	▼0.651 (pp)
- Democratic hold Democratic gain Republican hold Republican gain Independent hold Independent gain Democratic: 50–60% 60–70% 70–80% 80–90% >90% Republican: 40–50% 50–60% 60–70% 70–80% >90% Independent: 50–60%
Speaker before election
Rachel Talbot Ross
Democratic
Elected Speaker
Ryan Fecteau
Democratic

The 2024 Maine House of Representatives election was held on November 5, 2024, alongside the 2024 United States elections.

== Retirements ==
Thirty incumbents did not seek re-election.

=== Democrats ===
- District 9: Anne C. Perry was term-limited.
- District 20: Kevin O'Connell retired.
- District 40: Stanley Zeigler was term-limited.
- District 59: Raegan LaRochelle retired to run for State Senate.
- District 64: Colleen Madigan was term-limited.
- District 75: H. Scott Landry retired.
- District 86: Jessica Fay was term-limited.
- District 88: Kathy Shaw retired.
- District 93: Margaret Craven was term-limited.
- District 108: Maureen Terry was term-limited.
- District 109: James Boyle retired.
- District 110: Stephen Moriarty retired.
- District 114: Benjamin Collings was term-limited.
- District 118: Rachel Talbot Ross is term-limited (ran for State Senate).
- District 123: Rebecca Millett retired.
- District 129: Margaret O'Neil was term-limited.
- District 132: Erin Sheehan retired.
- District 145: Daniel Hobbs retired.

=== Republicans ===
- District 1: Austin Theriault retired to run for U.S. House.
- District 10: Kenneth Davis Jr. retired.
- District 18: Meldon Carmichael retired.
- District 33: Danny Costain retired.
- District 36: David Haggan is term-limited (ran for State Senate).
- District 61: Richard Bradstreet is term-limited (ran for State Senate).
- District 63: Scott Cyrway retired to run for State Senate.
- District 72: Larry Dunphy retired.
- District 81: Sawin Millett retired to run for Oxford County Commission.
- District 82: Caleb Ness retired.
- District 136: Heidi H. Sampson was term-limited.

=== Independents ===
- District 83: Walter Riseman retired.

== Resignations ==
Three seats were left vacant on the day of the general election due to resignations in 2024.

=== Democrats ===
- District 14: Lynne Williams resigned April 1 to become a worker's compensation mediator for the State of Maine.
- District 51: Rebecca Jauch resigned May 6 to accept a position with the National Marine Fisheries Service's Office of Sustainable Fisheries.

=== Republicans ===
- District 79: John Andrews resigned June 12 after Mike Soboleski lost the primary for Maine's 2nd congressional district.

== Incumbents defeated ==
=== In primary election ===
Two incumbent representatives, one Democrat and one Republican, were defeated in the June 11 primary election.

==== Democrats ====
- District 65: Bruce A. White lost renomination to Cassie Julia.

==== Republicans ====
- District 98: Joseph C. Galletta lost renomination to Guy Lebida.

== Predictions ==
Source	Ranking	As of
Sabato's Crystal Ball	Lean D	October 23, 2024

== Results ==
Italics denote an open seat held by the incumbent party; bold text denotes a gain for a party.

State House District	Incumbent	Party	Elected Representative	Outcome
1st	Austin Theriault	Rep	Lucien J.B. Daigle	Rep Hold
2nd	Roger Albert	Rep	Roger Albert	Rep Hold
3rd	Mark Babin	Rep	Mark Babin	Rep Hold
4th	Timothy Guerrette	Rep	Timothy Guerrette	Rep Hold
5th	Joseph F. Underwood	Rep	Joseph F. Underwood	Rep Hold
6th	Donald Ardell	Rep	Donald Ardell	Rep Hold
7th	Gregory Swallow	Rep	Gregory Swallow	Rep Hold
8th	Tracy Quint	Rep	Tracy Quint	Rep Hold
9th	Anne C. Perry	Dem	**Arthur Kevin Mingo**	**Rep Gain**
10th	Kenneth Ralph Davis Jr.	Rep	William R. Tuell	Rep Hold
11th	Tiffany Strout	Rep	Tiffany Strout	Rep Hold
12th	Billy Bob Faulkingham	Rep	Billy Bob Faulkingham	Rep Hold
13th	J. Mark Worth	Dem	**Russell White**	**Rep Gain**
14th	Vacant		**Gary Friedmann**	**Dem Gain**
15th	Holly Eaton	Dem	Holly Eaton	Dem Hold
16th	Nina Milliken	Dem	Nina Milliken	Dem Hold
17th	Ronald B. Russell	Dem	**Steven Bishop**	**Rep Gain**
18th	Meldon Carmichael	Rep	Mathew McIntyre	Rep Hold
19th	Richard H. Campbell	Rep	Richard H. Campbell	Rep Hold
20th	Kevin O'Connell	Dem	Dani L. O'Halloran	Dem Hold
21st	Ambureen Rana	Dem	Ambureen Rana	Dem Hold
22nd	Laura Supica	Dem	Laura Supica	Dem Hold
23rd	Amy Roeder	Dem	Amy Roeder	Dem Hold
24th	Joe Perry	Dem	Joe Perry	Dem Hold
25th	Laurie Osher	Dem	Laurie Osher	Dem Hold
26th	James Dill	Dem	James Dill	Dem Hold
27th	Gary Drinkwater	Rep	Gary Drinkwater	Rep Hold
28th	Irene Gifford	Rep	Irene Gifford	Rep Hold
29th	Kathy Javner	Rep	Kathy Javner	Rep Hold
30th	James L. White	Rep	James L. White	Rep Hold
31st	Chad R. Perkins	Rep	Chad R. Perkins	Rep Hold
32nd	Steven D. Foster	Rep	Steven D. Foster	Rep Hold
33rd	Danny Costain	Rep	Kenneth Fredette	Rep Hold
34th	Abigail W. Griffin	Rep	Abigail W. Griffin	Rep Hold
35th	James E. Thorne	Rep	James E. Thorne	Rep Hold
36th	David Haggan	Rep	Kimberly M. Haggan	Rep Hold
37th	Reagan Paul	Rep	Reagan Paul	Rep Hold
38th	Benjamin C. Hymes	Rep	Benjamin C. Hymes	Rep Hold
39th	Janice Dodge	Dem	Janice Dodge	Dem Hold
40th	Stanley Zeigler	Dem	Michael Ray	Dem Hold
41st	Victoria Doudera	Dem	Victoria Doudera	Dem Hold
42nd	Valli Geiger	Dem	Valli Geiger	Dem Hold
43rd	Ann Matlack	Dem	Ann Matlack	Dem Hold
44th	William Pluecker	Ind	William Pluecker	Ind Hold
45th	Abden Simmons	Rep	Abden Simmons	Rep Hold
46th	Lydia Crafts	Dem	Lydia Crafts	Dem Hold
47th	Edward Polewarczyk	Rep	**Wayne Farrin**	**Dem Gain**
48th	Holly Stover	Dem	Holly Stover	Dem Hold
49th	Allison Hepler	Dem	Allison Hepler	Dem Hold
50th	David Sinclair	Dem	David Sinclair	Dem Hold
51st	Vacant		**Rafael Macias**	**Dem Gain**
52nd	Sally Jeane Cluchey	Dem	Sally Jeane Cluchey	Dem Hold
53rd	Michael Lemelin	Rep	Michael Lemelin	Rep Hold
54th	Karen Montell	Dem	Karen Montell	Dem Hold
55th	Daniel Shagoury	Dem	Daniel Shagoury	Dem Hold
56th	Randall Greenwood	Rep	Randall Greenwood	Rep Hold
57th	Tavis Hasenfus	Dem	Tavis Hasenfus	Dem Hold
58th	Daniel J. Newman	Rep	**Sharon Frost**	**Ind Gain**
59th	Raegan LaRochelle	Dem	David Rollins	Dem Hold
60th	William Bridgeo	Dem	William Bridgeo	Dem Hold
61st	Richard Bradstreet	Rep	Alicia Collins	Rep Hold
62nd	Katrina Smith	Rep	Katrina Smith	Rep Hold
63rd	Scott Cyrway	Rep	Paul Flynn	Rep Hold
64th	Colleen Madigan	Dem	Flavia DeBrito	Dem Hold
65th	Bruce A. White	Dem	Cassie Julia	Dem Hold
66th	Robert Nutting	Rep	Robert Nutting	Rep Hold
67th	Shelley Rudnicki	Rep	Shelley Rudnicki	Rep Hold
68th	Amanda Collamore	Rep	Amanda Collamore	Rep Hold
69th	Dean Cray	Rep	Dean Cray	Rep Hold
70th	Jennifer Poirier	Rep	Jennifer Poirier	Rep Hold
71st	John Ducharme	Rep	John Ducharme	Rep Hold
72nd	Larry Dunphy	Rep	Elizabeth Caruso	Rep Hold
73rd	Michael Soboleski	Rep	Michael Soboleski	Rep Hold
74th	Randall C. Hall	Rep	Randall C. Hall	Rep Hold
75th	H. Scott Landry	Dem	Stephan Bunker	Dem Hold
76th	Sheila A. Lyman	Rep	Sheila A. Lyman	Rep Hold
77th	Tammy Schmersal-Burgess	Rep	Tammy Schmersal-Burgess	Rep Hold
78th	Rachel Ann Henderson	Rep	Rachel Ann Henderson	Rep Hold
79th	Vacant		**Michael Lance**	**Rep Gain**
80th	Caldwell Jackson	Rep	Caldwell Jackson	Rep Hold
81st	Sawin Millett	Rep	Peter Wood	Rep Hold
82nd	Caleb Joshua Ness	Rep	Nathan J. Wadsworth	Rep Hold
83rd	Walter N. Riseman	Ind	**Marygrace Cimino**	**Rep Gain**
84th	Mark Walker	Rep	Mark Walker	Rep Hold
85th	Kimberly Pomerleau	Rep	Kimberly Pomerleau	Rep Hold
86th	Jessica Fay	Dem	**Rolf A. Olsen**	**Rep Gain**
87th	David Boyer	Rep	David Boyer	Rep Hold
88th	Kathleen A. "Kathy" Shaw	Dem	**Quentin Chapman**	**Rep Gain**
89th	Adam R. Lee	Dem	Adam R. Lee	Dem Hold
90th	Laurel Libby	Rep	Laurel Libby	Rep Hold
91st	Joshua Morris	Rep	Joshua Morris	Rep Hold
92nd	Stephen J. Wood	Rep	Stephen J. Wood	Rep Hold
93rd	Margaret Craven	Dem	Julia A.G. McCabe	Dem Hold
94th	Kristen Cloutier	Dem	Kristen Cloutier	Dem Hold
95th	Mana Abdi	Dem	Mana Abdi	Dem Hold
96th	Michel Lajoie	Dem	Michel Lajoie	Dem Hold
97th	Richard G. "Rick" Mason	Rep	Richard G. "Rick" Mason	Rep Hold
98th	Joseph C. Galletta	Rep	**Kilton Webb**	**Dem Gain**
99th	Cheryl Golek	Dem	Cheryl Golek	Dem Hold
100th	Daniel Ankeles	Dem	Daniel Ankeles	Dem Hold
101st	Poppy Arford	Dem	Poppy Arford	Dem Hold
102nd	Melanie Sachs	Dem	Melanie Sachs	Dem Hold
103rd	Arthur L. Bell	Dem	Arthur L. Bell	Dem Hold
104th	Amy Arata	Rep	Amy Arata	Rep Hold
105th	Anne P. Graham	Dem	Anne P. Graham	Dem Hold
106th	Barbara Bagshaw	Rep	Barbara Bagshaw	Rep Hold
107th	Jane Pringle	Dem	**Mark Cooper**	**Rep Gain**
108th	Maureen Terry	Dem	Parnell Terry	Dem Hold
109th	James Boyle	Dem	Eleanor Sato	Dem Hold
110th	Stephen Moriarty	Dem	Christina Mitchell	Dem Hold
111th	Amy Kuhn	Dem	Amy Kuhn	Dem Hold
112th	W. Edward Crockett	Dem	W. Edward Crockett	Dem Hold
113th	Grayson Lookner	Dem	Grayson Lookner	Dem Hold
114th	Benjamin Collings	Dem	Dylan Pugh	Dem Hold
115th	Michael F. Brennan	Dem	Michael F. Brennan	Dem Hold
116th	Samuel Zager	Dem	Samuel Zager	Dem Hold
117th	Matthew Moonen	Dem	Matthew Moonen	Dem Hold
118th	Rachel Talbot Ross	Dem	Yusuf Yusuf	Dem Hold
119th	Charles Skold	Dem	Charles Skold	Dem Hold
120th	Deqa Dhalac	Dem	Deqa Dhalac	Dem Hold
121st	Christopher Kessler	Dem	Christopher Kessler	Dem Hold
122nd	Matthew D. Beck	Dem	Matthew D. Beck	Dem Hold
123rd	Rebecca Millett	Dem	Michelle Boyer	Dem Hold
124th	Sophia Warren	Dem	Sophia Warren	Dem Hold
125th	Kelly Noonan Murphy	Dem	Kelly Noonan Murphy	Dem Hold
126th	Andrew Gattine	Dem	Andrew Gattine	Dem Hold
127th	Morgan Rielly	Dem	Morgan Rielly	Dem Hold
128th	Suzanne Salisbury	Dem	Suzanne Salisbury	Dem Hold
129th	Margaret O'Neil	Dem	Marshall Archer	Dem Hold
130th	Lynn Copeland	Dem	Lynn Copeland	Dem Hold
131st	Lori Gramlich	Dem	Lori Gramlich	Dem Hold
132nd	Erin Sheehan	Dem	Ryan Fecteau	Dem Hold
133rd	Marc Malon	Dem	Marc Malon	Dem Hold
134th	Traci Gere	Dem	Traci Gere	Dem Hold
135th	Daniel Sayre	Dem	Daniel Sayre	Dem Hold
136th	Heidi Sampson	Rep	John M. Eder	Rep Hold
137th	Nathan Carlow	Rep	Nathan Carlow	Rep Hold
138th	Mark Blier	Rep	Mark Blier	Rep Hold
139th	David Woodsome	Rep	David Woodsome	Rep Hold
140th	Wayne Parry	Rep	Wayne Parry	Rep Hold
141st	Lucas Lanigan	Rep	Lucas Lanigan	Rep Hold
142nd	Anne-Marie Mastraccio	Dem	Anne-Marie Mastraccio	Dem Hold
143rd	Ann Marie Fredericks	Rep	Ann Marie Fredericks	Rep Hold
144th	Jeffrey S. Adams	Rep	Jeffrey S. Adams	Rep Hold
145th	Daniel Hobbs	Dem	**Robert Alan Foley**	**Rep Gain**
146th	Walter Runte	Dem	Walter Runte	Dem Hold
147th	Holly Sargent	Dem	Holly Sargent	Dem Hold
148th	Thomas Lavigne	Rep	Thomas Lavigne	Rep Hold
149th	Tiffany Danielle Roberts	Dem	Tiffany Danielle Roberts	Dem Hold
150th	Michele Meyer	Dem	Michele Meyer	Dem Hold
151st	Kristi Mathieson	Dem	Kristi Mathieson	Dem Hold
**Non-Voting Members**
Passamaquoddy	Aaron Dana	NVT (Note: Non-voting tribal member)	Aaron Dana	NVT
Maliseet	Zeke Crofton-Macdonald	NVT		NVT

== See also ==
- List of Maine state legislatures
