= Andrew McLean (American politician) =

American politician

Member of the Maine House of Representatives from the 27th district
- In office December 5, 2012 – August 16, 2020
- Preceded by: Jane Knapp
- Succeeded by: Kyle Bailey

Personal details
- Born: September 28, 1985 (age 40)
- Party: Democratic

Andrew McLean (born September 28, 1985) is an American politician from New Hampshire. McLean, a Democrat, was elected to the Maine House of Representatives in 2012 and served four terms. He represented the 27th House District, which includes part of Gorham. Shortly before becoming term-limited in 2020, McLean resigned his seat in August 2020 after completing his Juris Doctor degree at University of Maine School of Law to take a position as a law clerk for the York County Superior Court in Maine.

He is openly gay. He was one of six openly gay members of the Maine Legislature, alongside Sen. Justin Chenette (D–Saco) and Reps. Matt Moonen (D–Portland), Ryan Fecteau (D–Biddeford), Lois Galgay Reckitt (D–South Portland) and Craig Hickman (D–Winthrop). While in the Maine Legislature, McLean chaired the Joint Standing Committee on Transportation for six years. In August 2021, McLean began work as a transportation policy specialist with CDM Smith.
