= Maine's 31st State Senate district =

American legislative district

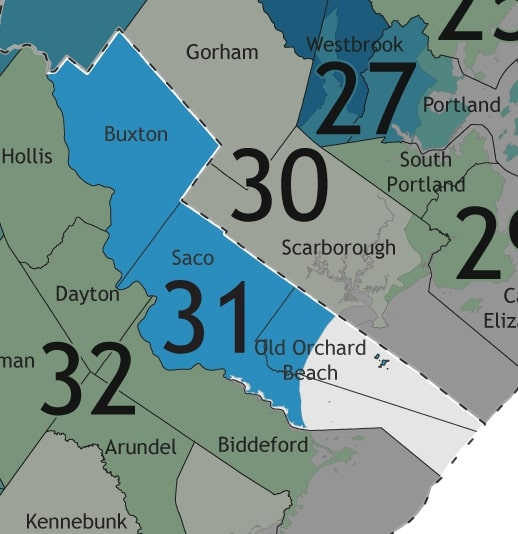
Senator
| Donna Bailey; D–Saco |
- Population (2020): 38,237

Maine's 31st State Senate district is one of 35 districts in the Maine Senate. It has been represented by Democrat Donna Bailey since 2020

== Geography ==
District 31 represents the north-eastern border of the county of York.

York County - 18% of county

City:

- Saco

Towns:

- Buxton
- Old Orchard Beach

== Recent election results ==
=== 2022 ===
2022 Maine State Senate election, District 31
| Party | Candidate | Votes | % |
|---|---|---|---|
| Democratic | Donna Bailey | 11,244 | 59 |
| Republican | Sharri MacDonald | 7,806 | 41 |
| Total votes | | 19,050 | 100.0 |
| Democratic hold | | | |

Elections prior to 2022 were held under different district lines.

=== 2024 ===
2024 Maine State Senate election, District 31
| Party | Candidate | Votes | % |
|---|---|---|---|
| Democratic | Donna Bailey | 13,107 | 57.7 |
| Independent | Craig Pendleton | 9,624 | 42.3 |
| Total votes | | 22,731 | 100.0 |
| Democratic hold | | | |

== Historical election results ==
=== 2012 ===
2012 Maine State Senate election, District 31
| Party | Candidate | Votes | % |
|---|---|---|---|
| Republican | Edward Youngblood | 11,085 | 55.1 |
| Democratic | Emery Deabay | 8,756 | 44.9 |
| Total votes | | 19,841 | 100 |
| Republican hold | | | |

=== 2014 ===
2014 Maine State Senate election, District 31 (Note: This election was a Democratic Hold, as Valentino had been redistricted from the 5th in early 2014)
| Party | Candidate | Votes | % |
|---|---|---|---|
| Democratic | Linda Valentino | 8,785 | 57.2 |
| Republican | Michael Coleman | 6,604 | 38.6 |
| Blank votes | None | 729 | 4.3 |
| Total votes | | 17,118 | 100 |
| Democratic hold | | | |

=== 2016 ===
2016 Maine State Senate election, District 31
| Party | Candidate | Votes | % |
|---|---|---|---|
| Democratic | Justin Chenette | 12,332 | 57.7 |
| Republican | Timothy Sevigny | 9,043 | 42.3 |
| Total votes | | 21,375 | 100 |
| Democratic hold | | | |

=== 2018 ===
2018 Maine State Senate election, District 31
| Party | Candidate | Votes | % |
|---|---|---|---|
| Democratic | Justin Chenette | 12,122 | 66.5 |
| Republican | Stavros Mendros | 6,113 | 33.5 |
| Total votes | | 18,235 | 100 |
| Democratic hold | | | |

=== 2020 ===
2020 Maine State Senate election, District 31
| Party | Candidate | Votes | % |
|---|---|---|---|
| Democratic | Donna Bailey | 13,266 | 54.7 |
| Republican | Craig Pendleton | 11,007 | 45.3 |
| Total votes | | 24,273 | 100 |
| Democratic hold | | | |
