= Abigail Griffin =

American politician

The Honorable

Member of the Maine House of Representatives from the 34th district
- Incumbent
- Assumed office December 7, 2022
- Preceded by: Morgan Rielly

Member of the Maine House of Representatives from the 102nd district
- In office December 2018 – December 7, 2022
- Preceded by: Stacey Guerin
- Succeeded by: Melanie Sachs

Personal details
- Party: Republican
- Spouse: James
- Children: 5
- Education: Bachelor of Science
- Profession: Teacher

Abigail Griffin is an American politician who has served as a member of the Maine House of Representatives since December 2018.

== Electoral history ==
She was first elected to the 102nd district in the 2018 Maine House of Representatives election, and was reelected in the 2020 Maine House of Representatives election. She was redistricted to the 34th district in the 2022 Maine House of Representatives election.

== Biography ==
Griffin earned a Bachelor of Science in education in 1977.

== Political Positions ==
=== Abortion ===
Griffin proposed a bill requiring abortion providers to offer pregnant women an ultrasound 48 hours before their pregnancy, saying “The woman will be counseled on alternative choices, such as support services for parenting and adoption services. The woman will be informed how far along she is in her pregnancy and the developmental stages of her baby. She will be offered an ultrasound and be able to see her baby.”
