= Kyle Bailey =

Kyle Bailey may refer to:

- Kyle Bailey (basketball) (born 1982), American basketball player and coach
- Kyle Bailey (politician), American state legislator in Maine
- Kyle Bailey (born 1986), Canadian ice hockey player drafted by the Minnesota Wild in the 2005 NHL Entry Draft
- Kyle Bailey, football player with Sheerwater F.C.
- Kyle Bailey, member of the 2009–10 Connecticut Huskies men's basketball team
- Kyle Bailey, member of the 2012 Clemson Tigers baseball team
