= Donna Bailey =

American politician and attorney (born 1961)

Member of the Maine Senate from the 31st district
- Incumbent
- Assumed office December 2, 2020
- Preceded by: Justin Chenette

Member of the Maine House of Representatives from the 14th district
- In office December 5, 2018 – December 2, 2020
- Preceded by: Jim Dill
- Succeeded by: Lynn Copeland

Personal details
- Born: 1961 (age 64–65)
- Party: Democratic
- Spouse: Joseph Parrette
- Children: 2
- Education: Bates College (BA); University of Maine (JD)
- Profession: Attorney
- Website: https://www.dbformaine.com/

Donna Bailey (born 1961) is an American politician and attorney from Maine. A Democrat, she serves in the Maine Senate representing District 31, which includes her residence in Saco, as well as the towns of Old Orchard Beach, Hollis, Limington and part of Buxton. Bailey grew up in Berlin, New Hampshire, and attended Berlin High School, Bates College and the University of Maine School of Law. She worked in real estate law, family law and probate law in private practice and was first elected to the Maine House of Representatives in 2016. In 2020, Bailey was elected to her first term in the Maine Senate.

== Early life and education ==
Bailey was born in 1961 and grew up in Berlin, New Hampshire. Her mother and grandfather worked in mills and factories, and Bailey was one of the first Head Start students as a young child. She began working at age 14 and graduated from Berlin High School in 1979, continuing to Bates College where she earned a degree in European history in 1983.

Bailey credits a maternal great aunt, Hilda Brungot, with inspiring her to pursue a law career. Brungot was the longest-serving woman state representative in the New Hampshire General Court. Bailey attended the University of Maine School of Law and completed her J.D. in 1986.

Beginning her legal career in real estate law, Bailey worked for the Maine Title Company for four years before opening a private practice in 1991. She continued in private civil practice, including real estate, family and probate law. She served as the York County Judge of Probate for four years.

== Political career ==
Bailey first ran for Maine House District 14 in 2016. She was unopposed in the primary and won the three-way general election with 50% of the vote. She was again unopposed in the 2018 House District 14 Democratic primary and won the three-way general election with 57% of the vote. While serving in the House, Bailey was the House Chair of the Judiciary Committee, the House Chair of the Maine Indian Claims Task Force, an appointee to the Pre-Trial Justice Task Force, and chair of the subcommittee to re-write the Maine probate code.

In 2018, Bailey ran again for House District 14 and was unopposed in the Democratic primary. In August 2020, Maine Senate District 31 incumbent Justin Chenette dropped out of the race, and Bailey announced that she would instead run for the Senate seat. She announced her Senate candidacy on August 12, 2020, and defeated Republican Craig Pendleton 55%-45% in the November general election. Bailey serves on the Appropriations and Financial Affairs & Government Oversight committees. She was reelected to her Senate District 31 seat in 2022 and 2024 and is seeking a fourth term in 2026.

== Personal life ==
Bailey and her husband, Joseph Parrette, live in Saco. They have two sons and two grandchildren. Bailey spends her spare time reading, researching genealogy, kayaking, hiking, gardening and spending time with family.

== Electoral history ==
=== Maine House ===
2016 Maine House District 14 Democratic primary
Party	Candidate	Votes	%
Democratic	Donna Bailey		100%
Total votes			100.0%

2016 Maine House District 14 General Election
Party	Candidate	Votes	%
Democratic	Donna Bailey	2,614	50.3%
Republican	Jeffrey Christenbury	1,588	30.6%
Independent	Jacob Johnston	995	19.2%
Total votes		5,197	100.0%

2018 Maine House District 14 Democratic primary
Party	Candidate	Votes	%
Democratic	Donna Bailey	962	100%
Total votes		962	100.0%

2018 Maine House District 14 General Election
Party	Candidate	Votes	%
Democratic	Donna Bailey	2,609	57.1%
Republican	Stephen DuPuis	1,282	28.1%
Independent	Frederick Samp	678	14.8%
Total votes		4,569	100.0%

2020 Maine House District 14 Democratic primary (Note: After the Senate incumbent's August withdrawal, Bailey ran as the Democratic candidate in the 2020 Senate election.)
Party	Candidate	Votes	%
Democratic	Donna Bailey	1,449	100%
Total votes		1,449	100.0%

=== Maine Senate ===
2020 Maine Senate District 31 General Election (Note: Bailey initially ran in the 2020 House District 31 primary. Incumbent Justin Chenette dropped out of the race after winning the Senate 31 primary and Bailey became the nominee.)
Party	Candidate	Votes	%
Democratic	Donna Bailey	13,266	54.7%
Republican	Craig Pendleton	11,007	45.3%
Total votes		24,273	100.0%
