= Senator Rosen (disambiguation) =

Senator Rosen may refer to:

- Jacky Rosen (born 1957), a United States senator from Nevada since 2019
- Julie Rosen (born 1957), a senator in the U.S. state of Minnesota since 2013
- Richard Rosen, a former senator in the U.S. state of Maine from 2004–2012
