= Amanda Heath =

American politician

Member-elect of the Maine Senate from the 15th district
- Assuming office December 2026
- Succeeding: Richard Bradstreet

Personal details
- Party: Democratic

Amanda Heath is an American politician. A member of the Democratic Party, she is the member-elect for the 15th district of the Maine Senate.
