= W. Edward Crockett =

American politician

Ed Crockett

Member of the Maine House of Representatives from the 112th district
- Incumbent
- Assumed office December 7, 2022
- Preceded by: Thomas Skolfield

Member of the Maine House of Representatives from the 43rd district
- In office December 2018 – December 7, 2022
- Preceded by: Heather Sanborn
- Succeeded by: Ann Matlack

Personal details
- Born: Portland, Maine, U.S.
- Party: Democratic (before 2025); Independent (2025–present)
- Spouse: Martha
- Children: 3
- Education: University of Maine (BA); Boston College (MBA)
- Website: Campaign website

W. Edward Crockett is an American businessman and politician who has served as a member of the Maine House of Representatives since December 2018. Elected as a Democrat, he became an independent in 2025 ahead of a brief campaign for Governor of Maine in the 2026 election. He also wrote a memoir for his father, Walter Crockett, and is the president of Capt’n Eli's Soda, a Maine-based soft drink company.

== Electoral history ==
Crockett was first elected in the 2018 Maine House of Representatives election to the 43rd district as a Democrat. He was reelected in the 2020 Maine House of Representatives election. He was redistricted to the 112th district and elected to it in the 2022 Maine House of Representatives election. He won re-election to a fourth term in 2024.

In July 2025, Crockett announced his intention to run for Governor of Maine in the 2026 election as an independent. He ended his lifelong affiliation with the Democratic Party in August 2025. However, Crockett failed to get sufficient qualifying signatures, and ended his campaign in June 2026.

== Biography ==
Crockett graduated from Portland High School in 1979. He earned a bachelor's degree in broadcasting and journalism from the University of Maine in 1983 and a Master of Business Administration in marketing/sales from Boston College in 1986. He is married to Martha and has three children.
