= Joseph E. Brooks =

American politician (1942–2022)

Member of the Maine House of Representatives for the 42nd District
- In office December 2012 – December 2014
- Preceded by: Peter Rioux (R)
- Succeeded by: James Gillway (R)

Member of the Maine House of Representatives for the 107th District
- In office December 1996 – December 2002
- Succeeded by: Jeffrey Kaelin (R)

Personal details
- Born: February 24, 1942 Brewer, Maine, U.S.
- Died: March 26, 2022 (aged 80) Winterport, Maine, U.S.
- Party: Unenrolled (independent)
- Spouse: Mary
- Education: John Bapst Memorial High School
- Profession: Journalist, Regional Director of Senior Service Agency

Joseph E. Brooks (February 24, 1942 – March 26, 2022) was an American politician, journalist and social service agency director from Maine. An Unenrolled (independent) member of the Maine House of Representatives, Brooks represented a portion of rural Waldo County including his residence in Winterport, Maine. He served in the Maine House previously from 1996 to 2002.

Brooks was originally from Brewer, Maine and graduated from John Bapst Memorial High School in Bangor, Maine. Brooks served in the Army National Guard from 1959 to 1972. He also worked as a newspaper editor and journalist with the Bangor Daily News from 1961 to 1998.

Brooks died in Winterport, Maine on March 26, 2022, at the age of 82.
