= James Boyle (Maine politician) =

American politician

Jim Boyle

Member of the Maine House of Representatives
- In office 7 December 2022 – 4 December 2024
- Preceded by: Bruce A. White
- Succeeded by: Eleanor Sato
- Constituency: 109th district
- In office 18 January 2022 – 7 December 2022
- Preceded by: Kyle Bailey
- Succeeded by: Gary Drinkwater
- Constituency: 27th district

Member of the Maine Senate from the 6th district
- In office 5 December 2012 – 3 December 2014
- Preceded by: Phil Bartlett
- Succeeded by: Amy Volk

Personal details
- Born: August 19, 1958 (age 67)
- Party: Democratic
- Education: University of Maine (BS)
- Profession: Businessperson, politician

James Allen Boyle (born 19 August 1958) is an American businessperson and politician from Maine. Boyle served as a Democratic State Senator from Maine's 6th District, representing Scarborough, Westbrook and his residence of Gorham from 2012 to 2014. Boyle was a candidate in the January 2022 special election for Maine House District 27, which he won. He ran for Governor of Maine in the 2018 election but dropped out before the Democratic primary. He owned Boyle Associates Environmental Consultants from 1996 to 2017 and Avant Dance & Event Center from 2009 to 2012.

Boyle, who ran as a privately funded candidate, defeated State Representative Tim Driscoll in the Democratic Primary for the District 6 Senate seat. The seat had been held by Phil Bartlett, who was unable to run for re-election due to term limits. In the general election, he beat Ruth Summers, wife of Maine Secretary of State Charlie Summers.

In 2014, Representative Amy Volk (R-Scarborough) defeated Boyle by a margin of approximately 900 votes in the November 2014 general election. The Volk-Boyle race was one of the state's most watched contests. Over $330,000 was spent by outside groups in the race. Boyle lost despite approximately two-thirds of the outside spending seeking to benefit Boyle.

He returned to the state legislature in 2022, via a special election to the Maine House of Representatives following the resignation of Kyle Bailey. He was elected to a full term in the regular election that year, but did not run for another term in 2024. He was succeeded by fellow Democrat Eleanor Sato.

He earned a B.S. in forest management from the University of Maine in 1981.
