= Kimberley Rosen =

American politician

Member of the Maine Senate from the 8th district
- In office December 3, 2014 – December 7, 2022
- Preceded by: Edward M. Youngblood
- Succeeded by: Mike Tipping

Member of the Maine House of Representatives from the 40th district
- In office December 1, 2004 – December 5, 2012
- Preceded by: Richard W. Rosen
- Succeeded by: Richard H. Campbell

Personal details
- Born: Kimberley Clark; October 8, 1958 (age 67) Island Falls, Maine, U.S.
- Party: Republican
- Spouse: Richard Rosen
- Education: University of Maine (B.S.)

Kimberley Clark Rosen (born October 8, 1958) is an American politician from Maine. A Republican, Rosen represented the towns of Orrington and her residence in Bucksport in the Maine House of Representatives from 2004 to 2012, when she was unable to run for re-election due to term-limits. She married former State Senator Richard Rosen, whom she replaced as State Representative. Either Richard or Kimberley Rosen represented Bucksport and Orrington from 1998 to 2004.

Upon the retirement of Republican State Senator Edward Youngblood in July 2014, Kim Rosen announced she would seek to replace him in the State Senate. She was later chosen as the Republican nominee by caucus.

Rosen graduated from the University of Maine and D'Lor Beauty School. She and her husband Richard owned Rosen's Department, until it closed in Spring 2013. Richard Rosen's grandparents opened the store in 1910 and moved it to Bucksport in 1929.

In November 2014, Rosen was elected to replace Youngblood.
