= Scott Cuddy =

American politician

Member of the Maine House of Representatives from the 98th district
- In office 2018–2022
- Preceded by: James Gillway
- Succeeded by: Joseph Galletta

Personal details
- Party: Democratic
- Website: www.cuddy.mainecandidate.com/go/community

Scott William Cuddy is an American politician. He served as a member of the Maine House of Representatives representing the 98th district from 2018 to 2022.

Cuddy endorsed the Bernie Sanders 2020 presidential campaign. Cuddy was an unsuccessful candidate in the 2024 Maine House of Representatives election.
