= Russell White (disambiguation) =

Russell White (born 1970) is a former American football player.

Russell White may also refer to:

- Russell White (bishop) (1896–1978), Church of England bishop
- Russell White (Australian politician) (1895 – 3 September 1981), Victorian National Party politician
- Russell White (American politician), Maine Republican politician
- Russell White (triathlete) (born 1992), Northern Irish athlete
