= Benjamin Collings =

American politician from Maine

Member of the Maine House of Representatives
- In office December 7, 2022 – December 3, 2024
- Preceded by: Randall Hall
- Succeeded by: Dylan Pugh
- Constituency: 114th district
- In office December 7, 2016 – December 7, 2022
- Preceded by: Peter Stuckey
- Succeeded by: Valli Geiger
- Constituency: 42nd district

Personal details
- Born: 1976 (age 49–50) Fort Kent, Maine
- Party: Democratic
- Occupation: Consultant
- Website: Bio

Benjamin Collings (born 1976) is an American politician from Maine. Collings, a Democrat was first elected to the Maine House of Representatives (District 42) in 2016. A political and business consultant, Collings has worked on various campaigns including most notably as the state director for Bernie Sanders in 2016. He successfully sponsored a bill to rename Columbus Day in favor of Indigenous Peoples' Day.

Collings grew up in Fort Kent, Maine and earned a social science degree from the University of Maine at Fort Kent. In June 2023 Collings offered an amendment to a Democrat led bill to expand abortion rights in Maine that would limit the legality of post-viability abortions for reasons of lethal fetal anomalies and to protect the mother’s health. For the final house vote to expand abortion access, Collings was absent.

Collings was unable to run in the 2024 Maine House of Representatives election due to term limits.
