= Steve Wood (disambiguation) =

Steve Wood (born 1963) is an American Anglican archbishop.

Steve, Steven or Stephen Wood may also refer to:

- Steve Wood (footballer, born February 1963), English football player for Reading
- Steve Wood (footballer, born June 1963), English football player
- Steve Wood (tennis) (born 1962), Australian tennis player
- Steven Wood (1961–1995), Australian canoeist
- Stephen J. Wood, American politician
- Stephen W. Wood (born 1948), Republican assemblyman from North Carolina
- Stephen Mosher Wood (1832–1920), Kansas politician
- Stephen Wood (ice hockey) (born 1981), American ice hockey coach and player
- Steven Wood, founder of Northern Cree Singers

== See also ==
- Steven Woods (disambiguation)
