= Bruce A. White =

American politician

Member of the Maine House of Representatives from the 65th district
- In office December 7, 2022 – December 4, 2024
- Preceded by: Amy Arata
- Succeeded by: Cassie Julia

Member of the Maine House of Representatives from the 109th district
- In office December 2018 – December 7, 2022
- Preceded by: Thomas Longstaff

Personal details
- Party: Democratic
- Spouse: Doreen
- Children: 2
- Education: High School
- Profession: Computer technician

Bruce A. White is an American politician who served as a member of the Maine House of Representatives from December 2018 to December 2024. He formerly represented Maine's 65th House district.

== Electoral history ==
White was first elected to the 109th district in the 2018 Maine House of Representatives election. He was reelected in the 2020 Maine House of Representatives election. He was redistricted to the 65th district and was elected to it in the 2022 Maine House of Representatives election.

In the 2024 Maine House of Representatives Elections, White lost the Democratic primary for the 65th District to Waterville Planning Board member Cassie Julia. Julia ran to the left of White, attacking his anti-abortion voting record. Julia was also the first state legislative candidate to ever be endorsed by Planned Parenthood Maine Action PAC. Julia would go on to win the general election in November.
