= David Haggan =

American politician

Member of the Maine Senate from the 10th district
- Incumbent
- Assumed office December 3, 2024
- Preceded by: Troy Jackson

Member of the Maine House of Representatives from the 36th district
- In office December 7, 2022 – December 3, 2024
- Preceded by: Michael F. Brennan
- Succeeded by: Kimberly Haggan

Member of the Maine House of Representatives from the 101st district
- In office December 2016 – December 7, 2022
- Succeeded by: Poppy Arford

Personal details
- Party: Republican
- Spouse: Kimberly Haggan
- Children: 2
- Education: University of Maine (BS)
- Profession: teacher

David G. Haggan is an American politician who has served as a member of the Maine Senate since December 2024. He was previously a member of the Maine House of Representatives from 2016 to 2024.

== Electoral history ==
Haggan was first elected to the 101st in the 2016 Maine House of Representatives election. He was reelected in the 2018 Maine House of Representatives election and the 2020 Maine House of Representatives election. He was redistricted to the 36th district in the 2022 Maine House of Representatives election.

== Biography ==
Haggan earned a Bachelor of Science from the University of Maine in 1989. He has worked as a middle school social studies teacher in Regional School Unit 22.
