= Eleanor Espling =

American politician

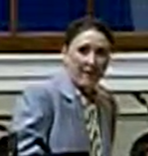

Member of the Maine House of Representatives for the 105th District (New Gloucester)
- In office December 2010 – December 2018
- Succeeded by: Amy Arata

Personal details
- Party: Republican
- Education: University of Southern Maine (BA)

Eleanor "Ellie" Espling is an American politician from Maine. A Republican, she served as a member of the Maine House of Representatives representing New Gloucester, Durham and part of Lisbon in Androscoggin and Cumberland counties from 2010 to 2018. She was a member of the Inland Fisheries and Wildlife Committee. Espling resides in New Gloucester with her husband Steve and their four children. She attended Cape Elizabeth High School and the University of Southern Maine, from which she earned an associate degree in Business Administration.

She sought election to the Maine Senate in 2018 but was narrowly defeated by Ned Claxton.
