= Quentin Chapman =

American politician

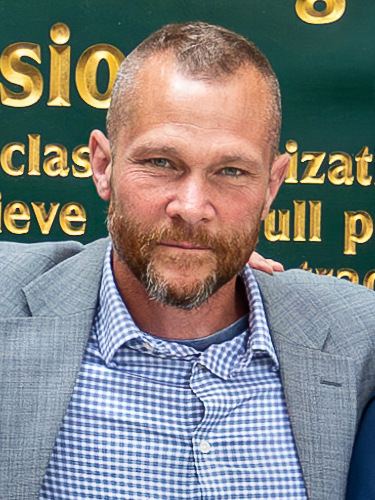

Member of the Maine House of Representatives from the 88th district
- Incumbent
- Assumed office December 3, 2024
- Preceded by: Kathy Shaw

Personal details
- Party: Republican

Quentin J. Chapman is an American politician. He has served as a member of the Maine House of Representatives since December 2024. He represents the 88th district which contains the city of Auburn, Maine.
