= Seven Siegel =

American politician

Member-elect of the Maine House of Representatives from the 109th district
- Assuming office December 2026
- Succeeding: Eleanor Sato

Personal details
- Party: Democratic

Seven Siegel is an American politician. A member of the Democratic Party, he is the member-elect for the 109th district of the Maine House of Representatives.
