= Stephen J. Wood =

American politician

The Honorable

Member of the Maine House of Representatives from the 92nd district
- Incumbent
- Assumed office December 2020
- Preceded by: Ann Matlack

Member of the Maine House of Representatives from the 57th district
- In office December 2014 – December 2018
- Preceded by: Thomas Martin Jr.

Member of the Maine House of Representatives from the 75th district
- In office December 2010 – December 2014

Personal details
- Party: Republican
- Spouse: Jean
- Children: 3

Stephen James Wood is an American politician who serves as a member of the Maine House of Representatives.

== Electoral history ==
He was first elected to the 75th district in the 2010 Maine House of Representatives election. He was reelected in the 2012 Maine House of Representatives election. He was redistricted to the 57th district and elected in the 2014 Maine House of Representatives election. He was reelected in the 2016 Maine House of Representatives election. He was term limited in 2018. He was redistricted to the 92nd district and elected in the 2020 Maine House of Representatives election. He was reelected in the 2022 Maine House of Representatives election. He got reelected again in the 2024 Maine House of Representatives election.

== Biography ==
Wood was born in Lewiston, Maine and graduated from Oak Hill High School in 1981. He served in the United States Navy for twenty years from 1981 to 2001 as an Aviation Hydraulics Technician.
