= Michael Ray (politician) =

American politician

Member of the Maine House of Representatives from the 40th district
- Incumbent
- Assumed office December 3, 2024
- Preceded by: Stanley Zeigler

Personal details
- Party: Democratic

D. Michael (Mike) Ray is an American politician. He has served as a member of the Maine House of Representatives since December 2024. He represents the 40th district which contains the communities of Appleton, Islesboro, Liberty, Lincolnville, Montville, Morrill and Searsmont.
