= Cassie Julia =

American politician

Member of the Maine House of Representatives from the 65th district
- Incumbent
- Assumed office December 3, 2024
- Preceded by: Bruce A. White

Personal details
- Party: Democratic
- Website: www.cassiejulia.com

Cassie Lynn Julia is an American politician. She has served as a member of the Maine House of Representatives since December 2024. She represents the 65th district which contains parts of Waterville. In the 2024 primary she was a progressive challenger to conservative democrat incumbent Bruce White. She was previously a planning board member in Waterville.
