= Lisa Pratt (politician) =

American politician

Member-elect of the Maine House of Representatives from the 135th district
- Assuming office December 2026
- Succeeding: Daniel Sayre

Personal details
- Party: Democratic

Lisa Pratt is an American politician. A member of the Democratic Party, she is the member-elect for the 135th district of the Maine House of Representatives.
