= Penobscot Theatre Company =

Coordinates: 44°47′57.73″N 68°46′21.27″W

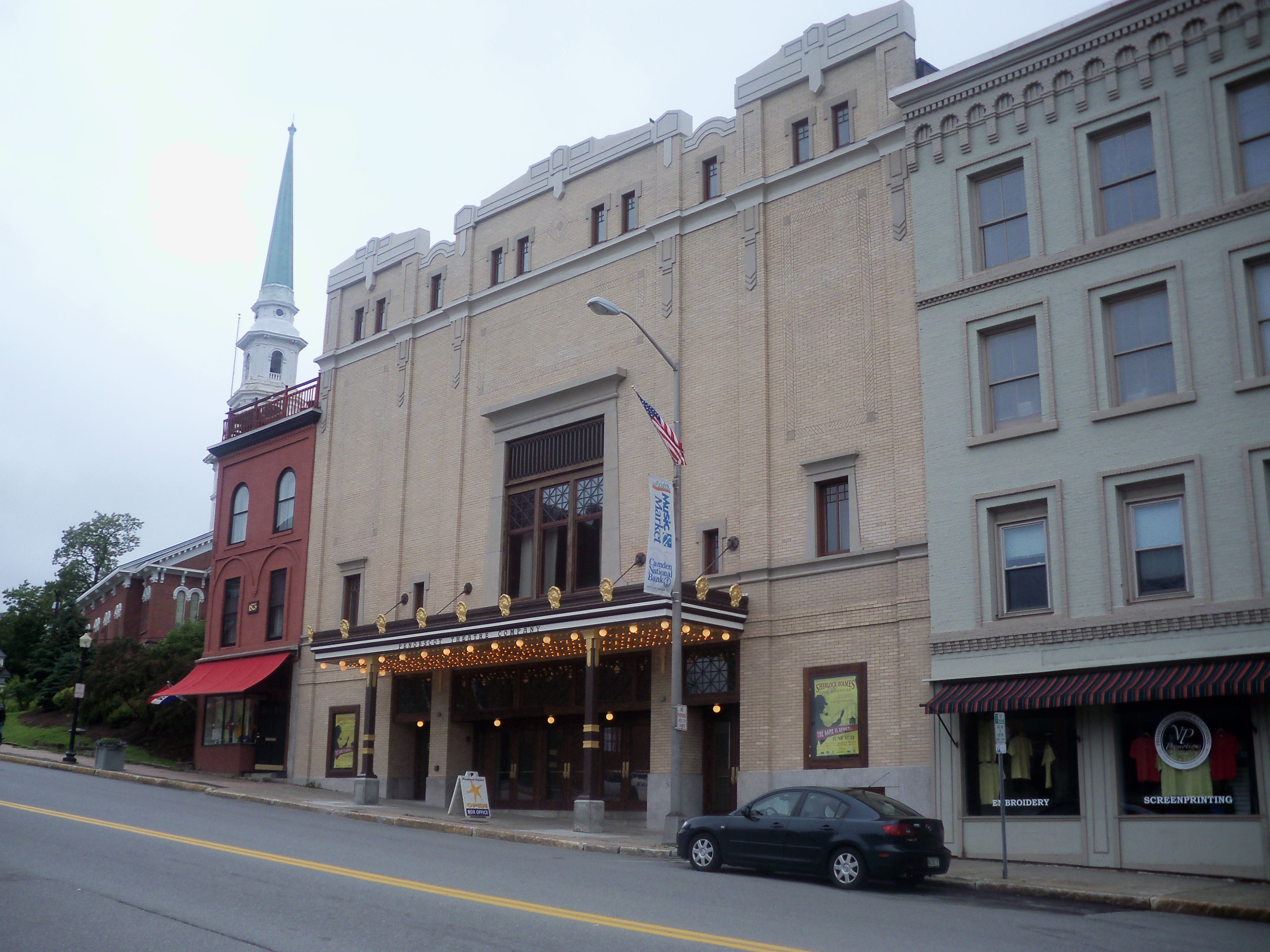
Bangor Opera House

Penobscot Theatre Company (PTC) is a professional theatre company located in Bangor, Maine.

== History ==
In 1973, George Vafiadis founded the Acadia Repertory Company, which spun off the Penobscot Theatre Company ten years later.

Joe Turner Cantu became Artistic Director in 1990 and remained in that position through 1992. Mark Torres was next named Producing Artistic Director and stayed in that position for the next 13 seasons.

In 1997, Penobscot Theatre Company purchased the Bangor Opera House, a theater built in 1920 at 131 Main Street in Bangor. The company subsequently renovated the building, restoring its facade in 2008 and renovating its auditorium in 2017.

In 2022, Jonathan Berry became artistic director, working alongside executive director Jen Shepard. In June 2025, Shepard succeeded Berry as artistic director, having served as executive director since 2021.

== Education ==
Penobscot Theatre Company operates the Dramatic Academy, an educational program offering acting classes, summer camps, and theatrical productions for young people.
