= Amy Kuhn =

American politician

Member of the Maine House of Representatives from the 111th district
- Incumbent
- Assumed office December 7, 2022
- Preceded by: John Ducharme

Personal details
- Party: Democratic
- Spouse: Jamie
- Children: 3
- Profession: Lawyer

Amy Kuhn is an American politician who has served as a member of the Maine House of Representatives since December 7, 2022. She represents Maine's 111th House district.

== Electoral history ==
She was elected on November 8, 2022, in the 2022 Maine House of Representatives election against Republican opponent Jeffrey York. She assumed office on December 7, 2022. She was part of the Falmouth city council starting in 2018, and was chair of the council from 2019 to 2022.

== Biography ==
Kuhn earned a Juris Doctor from George Washington University and a Bachelor of Arts from Goucher College.

Maine House of Representatives
Preceded by John Ducharme	Member of the Maine House of Representatives; 2022–present	Succeeded by incumbent
