= Steven Woods (disambiguation) =

Steven, Stephen, Stevie, or Steve Woods may refer to:

- Stevie Woods (musician) (1951–2014), American singer
- Stevie Woods (footballer) (born 1970), Scottish former goalkeeper
- Stephen Woods Jr. (born 1995), American professional baseball pitcher
- Steven Woods (born 1965), Canadian entrepreneur
- Steve Woods (born 1976), English footballer
- Steven Michael Woods Jr. (1980–2011), executed for murder

== See also ==
- Steve Wood (disambiguation)
