= Peter Wood (American politician) =

American politician

Member of the Maine House of Representatives from the 81st district
- Incumbent
- Assumed office December 3, 2024
- Preceded by: Sawin Millett

Personal details
- Party: Republican
- Website: www.peterwoodforme.com

Peter Conley Wood is an American politician. He has served as a member of the Maine House of Representatives since December 2024. He represents the 81st district which contains the communities of Albany Township, Greenwood, Locke Mills, Mason Township, Norway, South Oxford, Stoneham, Stow, Sweden and Waterford.
