= Kathleen Dillingham =

American politician from Maine

Minority Leader of the Maine House of Representatives
- In office December 6, 2018 – December 7, 2022
- Preceded by: Ken Fredette
- Succeeded by: Billy Bob Faulkingham

Member of the Maine House of Representatives from the 72nd district
- In office December 3, 2014 – December 7, 2022
- Preceded by: Michael Carey
- Succeeded by: Larry Dunphy

Personal details
- Born: November 25, 1970 (age 55)
- Party: Republican
- Spouse: Dana
- Children: 4
- Education: Central Maine Community College; University of Maine, Augusta (BA)

Kathleen Jackson Dillingham (born 25 November 1970) is an American politician from Maine. A Republican, Dillingham has been a member of the Maine House of Representatives since her election in 2014. While she was re-elected in November 2018, the Maine Republicans drastically reduced their numbers in the state legislature. She was subsequently chosen as Minority Leader by her colleagues. She represented the towns of Mechanic Falls, Otisfield, and Oxford. She previously served on the MSAD 17 School Board.

Her father is European-American and her mother is Puerto Rican, making her "the first Hispanic Republican Legislative Leader in Maine."

Maine House of Representatives
Preceded by Ken Fredette	Minority Leader of the Maine House of Representatives; 2018–2022	Succeeded by Billy Bob Faulkingham
