= Joseph Galletta =

American politician

The Honorable

Member of the Maine House of Representatives from the 98th district
- Incumbent
- Assumed office December 7, 2022
- Preceded by: Scott Cuddy

Personal details
- Party: Republican
- Spouse: Jennifer
- Children: 3
- Education: Keene State College

Joseph Galletta is an American politician from Durham, Maine who has served as a Republican member of the Maine House of Representatives since December 7, 2022. He represents Maine's 98th House district. In the 2023–24 Legislative session, Galletta was absent the most out of any member of the House, being absent 67% of days the legislature convened.

== Electoral history ==
He was elected on November 8, 2022, in the 2022 Maine House of Representatives election and assumed office on December 7, 2022. He ran in the 2024 Maine House of Representatives election, but lost the Republican primary election to Guy Lebida. Lebida would go on to lose the general election to Democrat Kilton Webb by less than fifty votes.

== Biography ==
Galletta attended Keene State College from 1985 to 1990. He is a landlord and owns three auto sale businesses.

Maine House of Representatives
Preceded by Scott Cuddy	Member of the Maine House of Representatives; 2022–present	Incumbent
