= Victoria Foley =

American politician

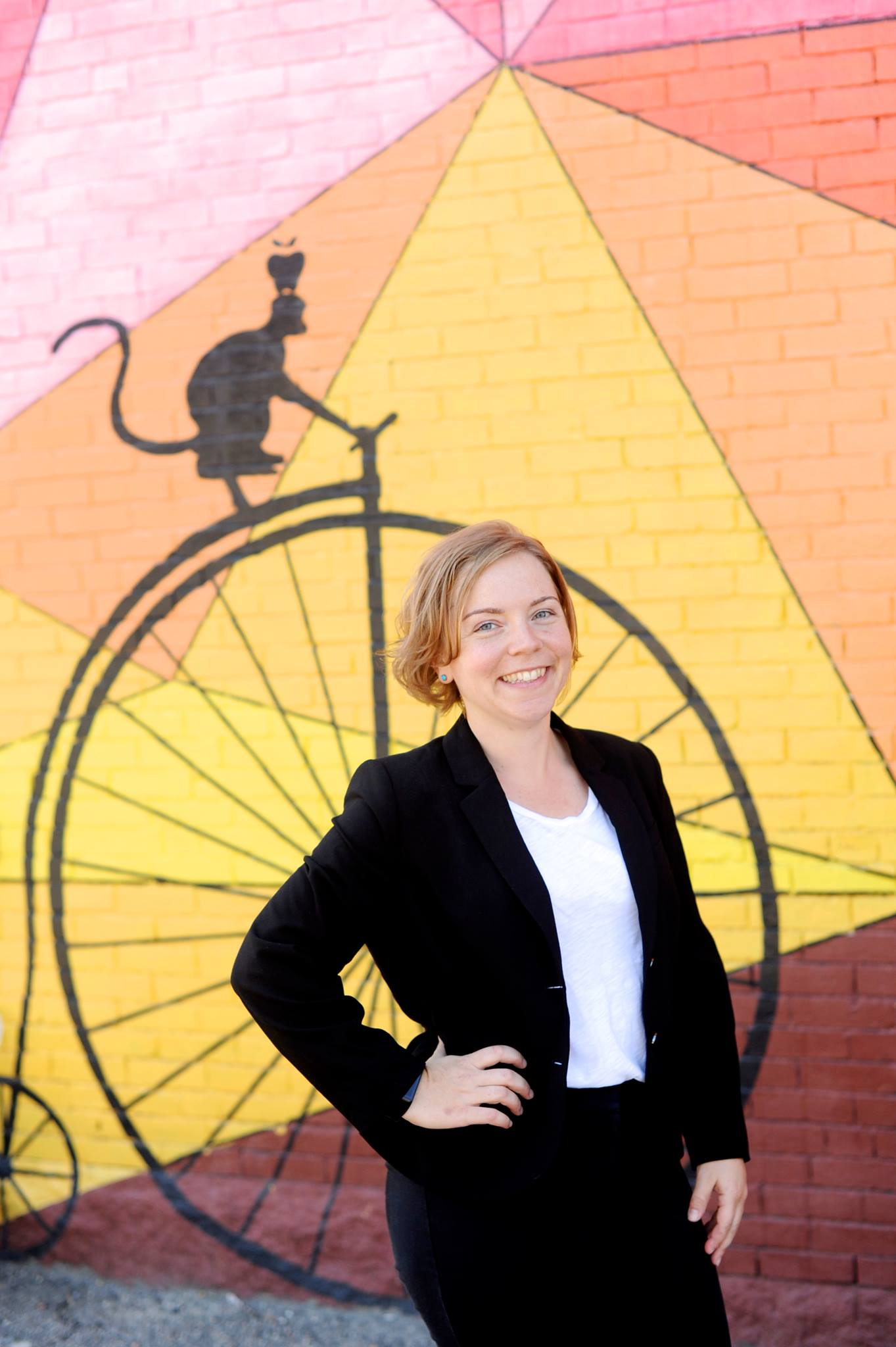

Member of the Maine House of Representatives from the 12th district
- In office December 5, 2018 – December 2, 2020
- Preceded by: Marty Grohman
- Succeeded by: Erin Sheehan

Personal details
- Born: Portland, Maine, U.S.
- Party: Democratic
- Spouse: Kevin Rooney
- Education: University of King's College (BA)

Victoria Foley is an American politician who served as a member of the Maine House of Representatives for the 12th district from 2018 to 2020. She is also a former member of the Biddeford City Council.

== Early life and education ==
Foley was born in Portland, Maine, and earned a Bachelor of Arts in journalism from University of King's College in 2005.

== Career ==
In 2018, the former State Representative for Maine's 12th district, Marty Grohman, chose not to seek reelection to the seat. Foley ran for the open seat, defeated fellow Democrat John Eder in the June 2018 primary with 57.2% of the vote, and was unopposed in the general election. She is running for re-election in 2020. Foley was unopposed in the 2018 general election for the 12th district seat.

In July 2021, Foley declared her candidacy for mayor of Biddeford, Maine. She was defeated by incumbent Mayor Alan Casavant.

== Personal life ==
Foley lives in Biddeford, Maine, with her husband Kevin Rooney.
