= David Giles (politician) =

American politician

Member-elect of the Maine House of Representatives from the 27th district
- Assuming office December 2026
- Succeeding: Gary Drinkwater

Personal details
- Party: Republican

David Giles is an American politician. A member of the Republican Party, he is the member-elect for the 27th district of the Maine House of Representatives.
