= Karen Foster =

American politician

Karen Foster (born c. 1944) is an American politician.

Foster is a resident of Augusta, Maine. She was a florist for twenty years, owned EF Flowers & Co., and served as city councilor for six years. Foster won election to the Maine House of Representatives in 2010, defeating Emily Mitchell. Foster ran for reelection in 2012, losing to Lori Fowle.
