= Michelle Dunphy =

American politician from Maine

Majority Leader of the Maine House of Representatives
- In office December 2, 2020 – December 7, 2022
- Preceded by: Matt Moonen
- Succeeded by: Maureen Terry

Member of the Maine House of Representatives from the 122nd district
- In office December 3, 2014 – December 7, 2022
- Succeeded by: Lois Reckitt

Personal details
- Party: Democratic
- Spouse: Matthew Dunlap
- Education: University of Maine (BA, BA)

Michelle Ann Dunphy is an American politician from Maine. A Democrat from Old Town, Dunphy represents District 122 of the Maine House of Representatives, which encompasses Old Town and Penobscot Indian Island Reservation of Penobscot County. Dunphy was elected for the first time in 2014. Re-elected in 2016, 2018, and 2020, she was also chosen as Majority Leader of the House in her final term.

Dunphy is a railroad enthusiast; in 2015, Dunphy submitted a bill, An Act to Provide Passenger Rail Service to Bangor. If passed, the bill would have begun the process of returning passenger rail service to Bangor, which ended in 1960.

She is married to Matthew Dunlap, who also served as a state representative before being elected Secretary of State and Maine State Auditor. They have one daughter.

Maine House of Representatives
Preceded by Matt Moonen	Majority Leader of the Maine House of Representatives; 2020–2022	Succeeded by Maureen Terry
