= Lucy Perkins =

American politician

Member-elect of the Maine House of Representatives from the 121st district
- Assuming office December 2026
- Succeeding: Christopher Kessler

Personal details
- Party: Democratic

Lucy Perkins is an American politician. A member of the Democratic Party, she is the member-elect for the 121st district of the Maine House of Representatives.
