= Lori Fowle =

American politician

Lori A. Fowle (born c. 1962) is an American politician.

Fowle is a resident of Vassalboro, Maine. For ten years, she was a hairdresser who owned the Prime Cut hair salon near Waterville until 1998, retiring to care for her three children. Her husband Evert Fowle Jr. served as district attorney for Kennebec and Somerset Counties from 2002 to 2012, when he was appointed a district court judge.

Politically, Lori Fowle is affiliated with the Democratic Party and served as a school board member for nine years, then as a Vassalboro budget committee member for three years. She faced Richard Fournier in a 2012 Democratic Party primary for District 58 of the Maine House of Representatives, and defeated Republican Party incumbent Karen Foster in the general election. Fowle won the reelection in 2014 against Republican candidate Ray Bates, after Andrew Fowler withdrew. During the 2016 election cycle, Fowle was redistricted to District 80, and lost her bid for a third consecutive term to Republican candidate Richard Bradstreet.
