= Dylan Pugh =

American politician

Member of the Maine House of Representatives from the 114th district
- Incumbent
- Assumed office December 3, 2024
- Preceded by: Benjamin Collings

Personal details
- Party: Democratic
- Education: College of the Atlantic
- Website: pughforportland.org

Dylan R. Pugh is an American politician. He has served as a member of the Maine House of Representatives since December 2024. He represents the 114th district which is located in Portland, Maine. Pugh is a software engineer by profession. Pugh was a candidate in the 2023 Portland, Maine mayoral election.
