= Eleanor Sato =

American politician

Member of the Maine House of Representatives from the 109th district
- Incumbent
- Assumed office December 3, 2024
- Preceded by: James Boyle
- Succeeded by: Seven Siegel (elect)

Personal details
- Party: Democratic
- Education: Fordham University
- Website: https://www.elliesatoformaine.com/

Eleanor "Ellie" Y. Sato is an American politician from Maine. A member of the Democratic Party, she has served as a member of the Maine House of Representatives since December 2024. Sato represents the 109th district which contains parts of Gorham, Maine. She is the first Japanese American to serve in the Maine State Legislature. She previously worked as a legislative aide, professional dancer and a bartender. In the legislature she has advocated including Asian American, Native Hawaiian, and Pacific Islander history to the state curriculum.
