= Kimberly Haggan =

American politician

Member of the Maine House of Representatives from the 36th district
- Incumbent
- Assumed office December 3, 2024
- Preceded by: David Haggan

Personal details
- Party: Republican
- Spouse: David Haggan
- Education: University of Maine at Farmington
- Website: www.kimforme.com

Kimberly Haggan is an American politician. She has served as a member of the Maine House of Representatives since December 2024.

Haggan is a retired public school teacher and administrator and is married to State Senator David Haggan.
