= Gary Drinkwater =

American politician

Member of the Maine House of Representatives from the 27th district
- Incumbent
- Assumed office December 7, 2022
- Preceded by: James Boyle
- Succeeded by: David Giles (elect)

Member of the Maine House of Representatives from the 121st district
- In office December 2018 – December 7, 2022
- Preceded by: Robert Duchesne
- Succeeded by: Christopher Kessler

Personal details
- Party: Republican

Gary Drinkwater is an American politician who has served as a member of the Maine House of Representatives since December 2018. He is a member of the Republican Party.

== Electoral history ==
He contested the 121st district in the 2016 Maine House of Representatives election, but lost to incumbent Robert Duchesne. He was elected to the 121st district in the 2018 Maine House of Representatives election. He was reelected in the 2020 Maine House of Representatives election. He was redistricted to the 27th district in the 2022 Maine House of Representatives election. After being reelected in 2024, he did not seek another term in 2026.

== Biography ==
Drinkwater served as a sergeant in the United States Air Force for 6 years. He is a member of the National Rifle Association of America.

== Political Positions ==
Drinkwater has spread claims that there was electoral fraud in the 2020 presidential election. In 2023 he sponsored a Bill to establish a rating system for school library books amidst a conservative concerns about educational materials on race and gender issues.
