= Richard Bradstreet =

American politician and businessman

Member of the Maine Senate from the 15th district
- Incumbent
- Assumed office December 4, 2024
- Preceded by: Matthew Pouliot
- Succeeded by: Amanda Heath (elect)

Member of the Maine House of Representatives from the 61st district
- In office December 7, 2022 – December 4, 2024
- Preceded by: Heidi Brooks
- Succeeded by: Alicia Carol Collins

Member of the Maine House of Representatives from the 80th district
- In office December 7, 2016 – December 7, 2022
- Preceded by: Lori Fowle
- Succeeded by: Caldwell Jackson

Personal details
- Party: Republican
- Spouse: JoAnne
- Children: 3, including Amy Arata
- Education: Dartmouth College (BA)

Richard T. Bradstreet is an American politician and businessman serving as a member of the Maine House of Representatives from the 80th district. He assumed office in 2016.

== Early life and education ==
Bradstreet is a native of Vassalboro, Maine. He earned a Bachelor of Arts degree in sociology from Dartmouth College in 1973.

== Career ==
From 1973 to 2015, Bradstreet was the owner and president of Bradstreet Homes. He was elected to the Maine House of Representatives in 2016. Since 2019, he has been the ranking member of the House Labor and Housing Committee.

== Personal life ==
Bradstreet and his wife, JoAnne, have three children. His daughter, Amy Arata, is also a member of the Maine House of Representatives.
