= Larry Dunphy =

American politician

Member of the Maine House of Representatives from the 72nd district
- Incumbent
- Assumed office December 7, 2022
- Preceded by: Kathleen Jackson Dillingham

Personal details
- Born: May 9, 1952 (age 74)
- Party: Republican
- Spouse: Cynthia Dunphy
- Children: 3
- Education: NHTI - Concord's Community College

Larry Dunphy (born May 9, 1952) is an American politician who has served as a member of the Maine House of Representatives since December 7, 2022. He represents Maine's 72nd House district.

Larry Dunphy has a degree in Pulp & Paper from NHTI
