= Maine's 15th State Senate district =

American legislative district

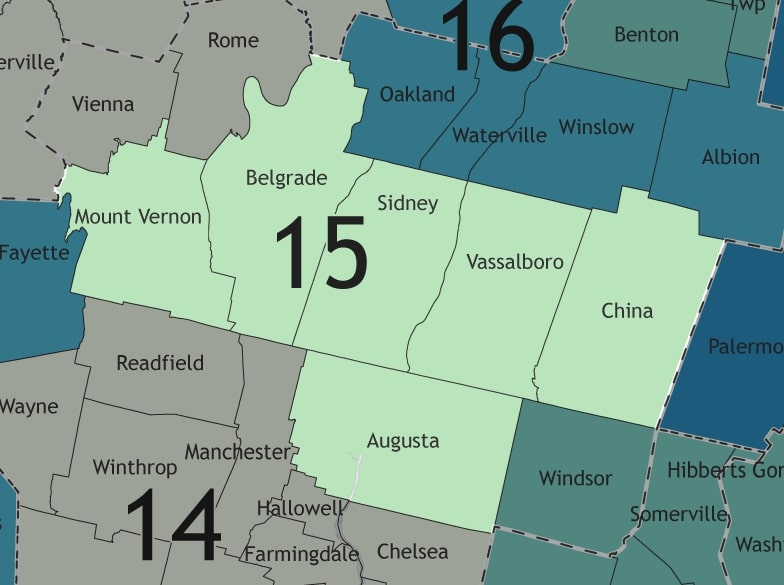
Senator
Dick Bradstreet; R–Vassalboro
- Population (2020): 37,770

Maine's 15th State Senate district is one of 35 districts in the Maine Senate. It has been represented by Republican Dick Bradstreet since 2024.

== Geography ==
District 15 is made up of a small part of Kennebec County. It includes the county seat of Augusta

Kennebec County - 30.5% of county

City:

- Augusta

Towns:

- Belgrade
- China
- Mount Vernon
- Sidney
- Vassalboro

== Recent election results ==
=== 2022 ===
2022 Maine State Senate election, District 15
Party	Candidate	Votes	%
Republican	Matthew Pouliot	10,241	57.8
Democratic	Storme St. Valle	7,491	43.9
Total votes		17,732	100.0
Republican hold			

Elections prior to 2022 were held under different district lines.

=== 2024 ===
2024 Maine State Senate election, District 15
Party	Candidate	Votes	%
Republican	Dick Bradstreet	10,820	50.5
Democratic	Raegan LaRochelle	10,621	49.5
Total votes		21,441	100.0
Republican hold			

== Historical election results ==
=== 2012 ===
2012 Maine State Senate election, District 15
Party	Candidate	Votes	%
Democratic	John Cleveland	10,341	53.5
Republican	Lois Snowe-Mello	8,982	46.4
Total votes		19,323	100
Democratic gain from Republican			

=== 2014 ===
2014 Maine State Senate election, District 15 (Note: This election was a Republican hold, as Katz had been redistricted from the 28th district in early 2014)
Party	Candidate	Votes	%
Republican	Roger Katz	11,938	69.6
Democratic	Rebecca Cornell du Houx	4,600	26.8
Blank votes	None	616	3.6
Total votes		17,154	100
Republican hold			

=== 2016 ===
2016 Maine State Senate election, District 15
Party	Candidate	Votes	%
Republican	Roger Katz	15,154	77
Democratic	Henry K. Dilts	4,516	23
Total votes		19,670	100
Republican hold			

=== 2018 ===
2018 Maine State Senate election, District 15
Party	Candidate	Votes	%
Republican	Matthew Pouliot	9,497	56.9
Democratic	Kellie Julia	7,197	43.9
Total votes		16,694	100
Republican hold			

=== 2020 ===
2020 Maine State Senate election, District 15
Party	Candidate	Votes	%
Republican	Matthew Pouliot	12,167	57.4
Democratic	Kalie Hess	9,039	42.6
Total votes		21,206	100
Republican hold			
