= Daniel Sayre =

American politician

Member of the Maine House of Representatives from the 135th district
- Incumbent
- Assumed office December 7, 2022
- Preceded by: Lynne Williams
- Succeeded by: Lisa Pratt (elect)

Personal details
- Party: Democratic
- Children: 2
- Education: Bachelor of Arts in history
- Alma mater: Yale University
- Profession: Consultant
- Website: https://www.dan4maine.com

Daniel Sayre is an American politician who has served as a member of the Maine House of Representatives since December 7, 2022. He represents Maine's 135th House district.

== Electoral history ==
He was elected on November 8, 2022, in the 2022 Maine House of Representatives election against Republican opponent Jared Hirshfield. He assumed office on December 7, 2022.

== Biography ==
Sayre earned a Bachelor of Arts in history from Yale University in 1985.

Maine House of Representatives
Preceded by Lynne Williams	Member of the Maine House of Representatives; 2022–present	Succeeded by incumbent
