= Edward Youngblood =

American politician and banker

Member of the Maine Senate from the 31st district
- In office December 5, 2012 – December 3, 2014
- Preceded by: Richard Rosen
- Succeeded by: Kimberly Rosen

Personal details
- Born: August 8, 1939 (age 86) Milo, Maine, U.S.
- Party: Republican
- Spouse: Peggy Youngblood
- Profession: Banker

Edward Youngblood (born August 8, 1939) is an American politician and banker from Maine. Youngblood, a Republican from Brewer, served as State Senator from Maine's 31st District, representing part of Penobscot and Hancock counties, including the population centers of Bucksport and Brewer. He was first elected to the Maine State Senate in 2000 and served until 2004. He was re-elected after Richard Rosen was unable to run for re-election due to term-limits in 2012.

He has served as Senior Vice President of Bangor Savings Bank since 1975.

He earned a B.S. from Husson College in 1961 and graduated from the Graduate School of Banking of Fairfield University in 1983.

He withdrew from his 2014 reelection bid, citing the difficulty of traveling between Augusta and Brewer every day the legislature was in session, along with his age. He cited passage of a large energy bill as his greatest accomplishment.

Maine Senate
Preceded by Richard P. Ruhlin	Member of the Maine Senate from the 6th district 2000–2004	Succeeded by Phil Bartlett
Preceded by Richard Rosen	Member of the Maine Senate from the 31st district 2012–2014	Succeeded by Linda Valentino
