= Ryan Fecteau =

American politician and Speaker of the Maine House of Representatives

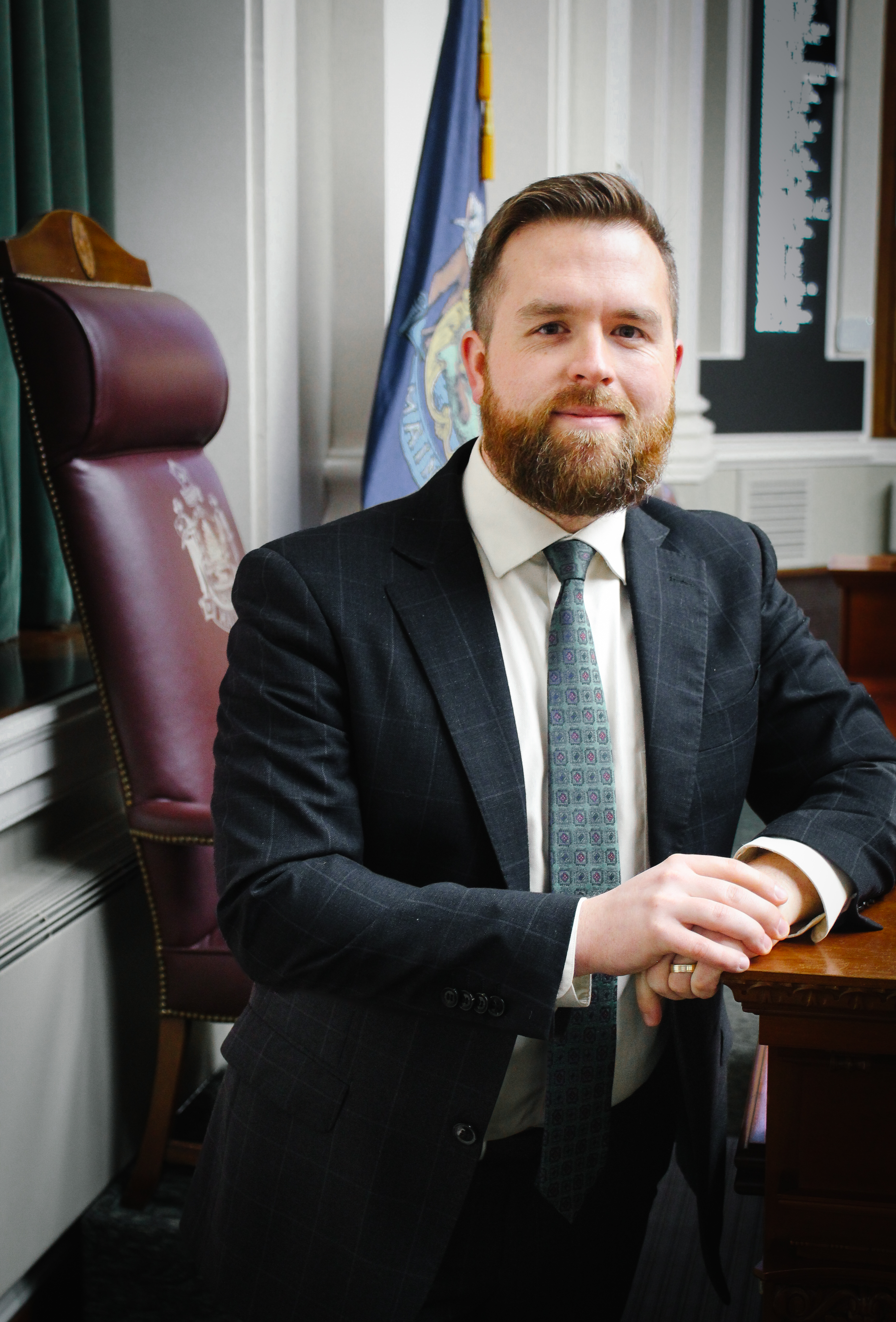

103rd Speaker of the Maine House of Representatives
- Incumbent
- Assumed office December 4, 2024
- Preceded by: Rachel Talbot Ross
- In office December 2, 2020 – December 7, 2022
- Preceded by: Sara Gideon
- Succeeded by: Rachel Talbot Ross

Member of the Maine House of Representatives
- Incumbent
- Assumed office December 4, 2024
- Preceded by: Erin Sheehan
- Constituency: 132nd district
- In office December 3, 2014 – December 7, 2022
- Preceded by: Paulette Beaudoin
- Succeeded by: Tiffany Strout
- Constituency: 11th district

Personal details
- Born: Ryan Michael Fecteau; September 18, 1992 (age 34) Biddeford, Maine, U.S.
- Party: Democratic
- Spouse: Dylan Doughty (m. 2024)
- Education: Catholic University (BA)
- Website: Campaign website

Ryan Michael Fecteau (born September 18, 1992) is an American politician who serves as the Speaker of the Maine House of Representatives. A Democrat, Fecteau represented Maine House District 11, consisting of a portion of Biddeford from 2014 until 2022 when term limits forced him to retire. He ran for the statehouse again in 2024 and was elected to represent Maine's 132nd district. At the time of his first election as Speaker of the House in December 2020, Fecteau was both the youngest active state Speaker in the United States and the first openly gay person to serve as Speaker of the Maine House.

Fecteau was born and raised in Biddeford, Maine, and graduated from Biddeford High School. He attended the Catholic University of America where he was active in student government and LGBTQ+ advocacy. He was first elected to Maine House District 11 in 2014 when he was 21 years old and was re-elected in 2016, 2018, 2020 and returned to House in 2024. In November 2018, Fecteau was elected Assistant Majority Leader of the Maine House, and in December 2020, and again in December 2024, he was elected Speaker of the House. He is an account executive at Catalist.

== Early life and education ==
Fecteau is a native of Biddeford, Maine, and the grandson of French-Canadian immigrants. He was raised by a single mother who worked in healthcare, and Fecteau grew up in subsidized housing; the family often relied on the Supplemental Nutrition Assistance Program for food. Fecteau graduated from Biddeford High School, spending two years as the student representative to the Biddeford School Committee during his time there.

After high school, Fecteau attended the Catholic University of America where he majored in both political science and theological & religious studies. He was the president of the CUAllies, the University's LGBTQ+ advocacy group, and led a campaign to have the group officially recognized by the University, an effort which ultimately failed. While at CUA, Fecteau was the first openly gay speaker of the Student Government General Assembly and completed internships at the Democratic National Committee, the Human Rights Campaign, Catalist, and in the office of US Representative Chellie Pingree. He was the first person in his family to graduate from college.

== Career ==
Fecteau has worked as a field organizer for Mainers United for Marriage in 2012, was the chairman of the Biddeford Democratic Committee from 2011 to 2012, and was an editorial director at Trueline Publishing in Portland, Maine. He has worked at several Ogunquit, Maine businesses since 2014 and at the Perkins Cove. In late 2020, he was hired as an account executive at Catalist.

== Political experience ==
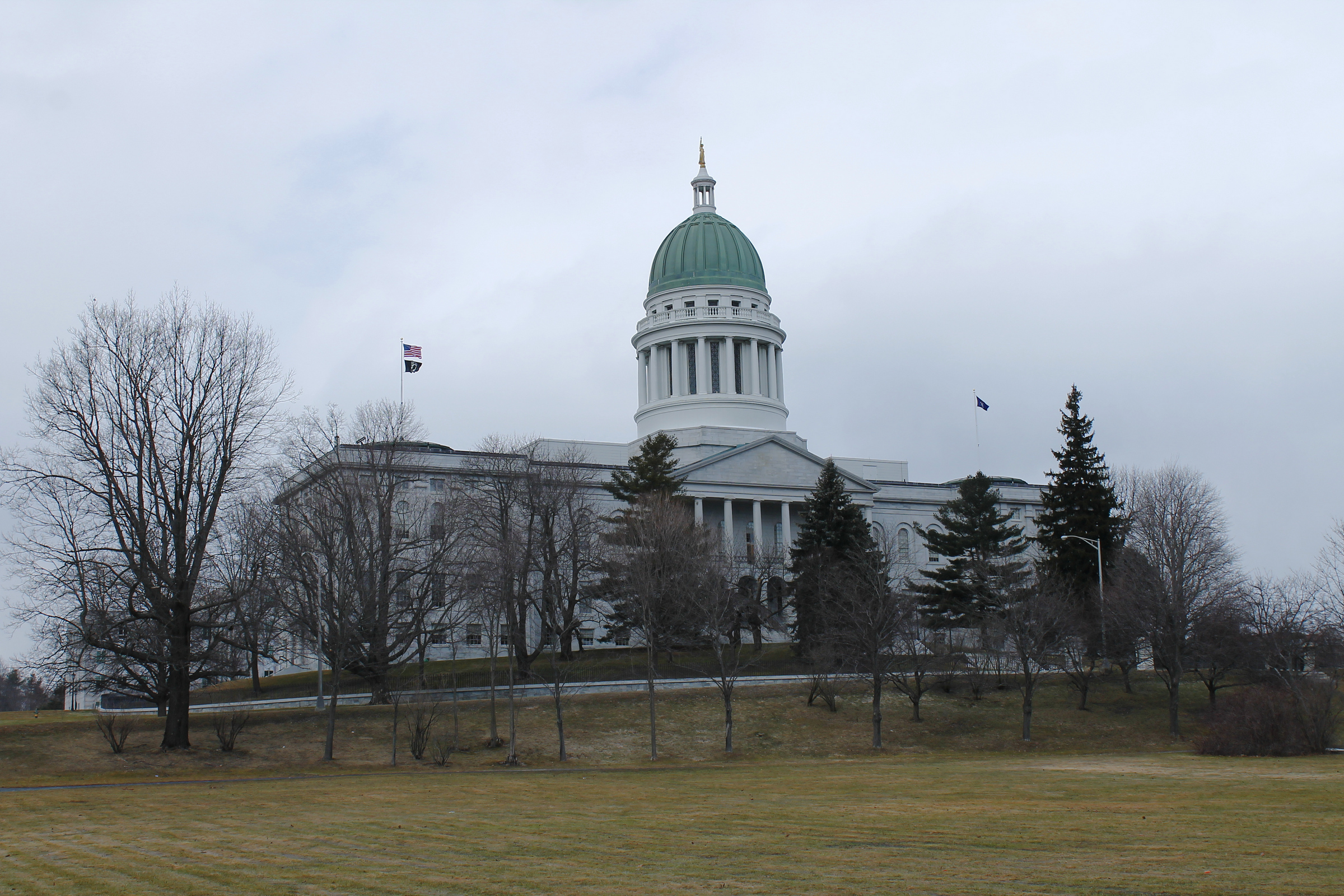
Fecteau was first elected to the Maine State House of Representatives in 2014.

In 2013, while he was still a student at CUA, Fecteau began his campaign for Maine House District 11. He traveled to Maine on weekends to campaign and recruited friends to call voters during the weekends when he could not make the trip. Fecteau defeated fellow Democrat David Flood 65%–35% in the 2014 House District 11 Democratic primary and beat Republican Debi Davis 67%–33% in the general election. He was 21, the third-youngest member of the Maine legislature and the youngest openly gay state representative in the United States.

Fecteau ran unopposed in the 2016 Democratic primary and defeated Republican Renee Morin 68%–32%.

=== Assistant Majority Leader ===
In 2018, Fecteau was again unopposed in the primary and defeated Republican Emily Rousseau 62%–38%. On November 16, 2018, the Maine House Democrats elected him Assistant House Majority Leader. Matt Moonen served as Majority Leader and Sara Gideon was the House Speaker. Fecteau’s signature legislation was a ban on the harmful practice of conversion therapy in Maine. In 2018, despite the Legislature’s support, Governor LePage was the only Republican Governor in the nation to veto a conversion therapy bill. In 2019, Governor Janet Mills signed the bill into law. Fecteau also worked on a bipartisan measure to expand affordable housing in Maine, the single largest investment in housing in Maine’s history.

=== House Speaker ===
Fecteau ran unopposed in both the House District 11 Democratic primary and the general election in 2020. On December 2, 2020, the Maine House elected him as their 103rd Speaker. While Fecteau ordinarily would have been sworn in by Governor Janet Mills, Mills was quarantining after possible exposure to COVID-19, so Acting Chief Justice of the Maine Supreme Judicial Court Andrew Mead conducted the ceremony instead. At the time of his swearing-in, Fecteau was the youngest presiding officer in the United States, the youngest Maine House speaker since 1842 and the first out speaker in Maine history.

During his time as Speaker, he worked with Senate President Troy Jackson to pass LD 1, the COVID-19 Patient Bill of Rights and continue the work of the 130th Legislature through a hybrid model of virtual public hearings and occasional distanced sessions at a Civic Center before returning to the state house in June 2021. His bill to expand dental care to 217,000 low-income Mainers was funded as part of the biennial budget. Fecteau's multi-year efforts to fund capital improvements for Maine’s career and technical education centers finally passed in 2021 through his bill for $20 million and an additional $20 million was designated through American Rescue Plan funding. In June 2020 Fecteau joined with Republicans to defeat a bill aiming to extend overtime protections to farm workers; however, he did back a bill to provide farm workers the right to organize. In the same year, legislation he worked on to reform the state’s troubled unemployment insurance system became law. Because of another bill passed by Speaker Fecteau in 2021, Maine municipalities could be incentivized to adopt zoning ordinances that encourage more affordable housing in Maine towns. He authored legislation that allowed property owners to build an accessory dwelling unit on lots previously zoned exclusively for single-family housing. He was later hired by Avesta Housing to serve on its board. Fecteau was term-limited in 2022 and was succeeded by fellow Democrat Marc Malon in his House district, which was renumbered to the 133rd following redistricting. Rachel Talbot Ross succeeded Fecteau as Speaker of the House.

Fecteau returned to the Maine House of Representatives following 2024 election, after being elected unopposed in the neighboring 132nd district, which also consists entirely of a portion of Biddeford and had been vacated by the retirement of Erin Sheehan. In December 2024, Fecteau was re-elected to a second, non-consecutive term as Speaker of the Maine House of Representatives.

Fecteau was considered a potential candidate for the Democratic nomination to challenge Senator Susan Collins in the 2026 United States Senate election.

== Personal life and recognition ==
Fecteau lives in Biddeford with his Goldendoodle, Pancake. In 2015, he received Youth Innovator of the Year award from The Trevor Project, a group focused on suicide prevention among lesbian, gay, bisexual, transgender, questioning, and queer youth, at their annual TrevorLIVE event.

== Electoral history ==
=== Maine House of Representatives (2014–2020) ===
2014 Maine House District 11 Democratic Primary
Party	Candidate	Votes	%
Democratic	Ryan Fecteau	495	65.2%
Democratic	David Flood	263	34.8%
Total votes		756	100.0%

2014 Maine House District 11 General Election
Party	Candidate	Votes	%
Democratic	Ryan Fecteau	2,475	67.1%
Republican	Debi Davis	1,209	32.8%
Total votes		3,684	100.0%

2016 Maine House District 11 General Election
Party	Candidate	Votes	%
Democratic	Ryan Fecteau	3,194	67.9%
Republican	Renee Morin	1,512	32.1%
Total votes		4,706	100.0%

2018 Maine House District 11 General Election
Party	Candidate	Votes	%
Democratic	Ryan Fecteau	2,395	62.0%
Republican	Emily Rousseau	1,466	38.0%
Total votes		3,861	100.0%

2020 Maine House District 11 General Election
Party	Candidate	Votes	%
Democratic	Ryan Fecteau	4,113	100.0%
Total votes		4,113	100.0%

=== Maine House of Representatives (2024–present) ===
Maine House of Representatives district 132 General Election, 2024
Party	Candidate	Votes	%
Democratic	Ryan Fecteau (incumbent)	3,524	100%
Total votes		3,524	100.0%
Democratic hold			

Political offices
Preceded by Sara Gideon	Speaker of the Maine House of Representatives; 2020–2022	Succeeded by Rachel Talbot Ross
Preceded by Rachel Talbot Ross	Speaker of the Maine House of Representatives; 2024–present	Incumbent
