= Kelly Noonan Murphy =

American politician

Member of the Maine House of Representatives from the 125th district
- Incumbent
- Assumed office December 7, 2022
- Preceded by: Amy Roeder

Personal details
- Born: 1974 or 1975 (age 51–52)
- Party: Democratic
- Children: 3
- Education: Catholic University of America, Columbus School of Law
- Profession: Preschool teacher

Kelly Noonan Murphy is an American politician who has served as a member of the Maine House of Representatives since December 7, 2022. She represents Maine's 125th House district.

== Electoral history ==
She was elected on November 8, 2022, in the 2022 Maine House of Representatives election against Republican opponent Alan Livingston. She assumed office on December 7, 2022.

== Biography ==
Murphy graduated from Scarborough High School in 1993, Catholic University of America in 1997 with a bachelor's degree in English, and from Columbus School of Law in 2000.

Maine House of Representatives
| Preceded by Amy Roeder | Member of the Maine House of Representatives; 2022–present | Succeeded by incumbent |
