= Kyle Bailey (politician) =

American politician

Member of the Maine House of Representatives from the 27th district
- In office December 2, 2020 – October 15, 2021
- Preceded by: Andrew McLean
- Succeeded by: James Boyle

Personal details
- Party: Democratic

Kyle Bailey is a former American politician, who was elected to the Maine House of Representatives in 2020. He briefly represented the 27th district as a member of the Maine Democratic Party. He resigned in October 2021 after less than one year of service.
