= James Worth =

American politician (born 1948)

Member of the Maine House of Representatives from the 13th district
- In office December 7, 2022 – December 10, 2024
- Preceded by: Lori Gramlich
- Succeeded by: Russell White

Personal details
- Born: James Mark Worth; 1948 (age 77–78) Detroit, Michigan, US
- Party: Democratic
- Education: bachelor's degree, master's degree in education, master's degree in divinity
- Alma mater: Northern Michigan University, American International College, Meadville Lombard Theological School
- Profession: Unitarian Universalist pastor

James Mark Worth (born April 3, 1948), known publicly as Mark Worth, is an American clergyman and politician who served as a member of the Maine House of Representatives from December 7, 2022 until December 10, 2024. He represented Maine's 13th House district, comprising the towns of Ellsworth and Waltham.

== Biography ==
J. Mark Worth was born in Detroit, Michigan, in 1948. Worth earned a bachelor's degree from Northern Michigan University in 1970, a master's degree in education from American International College in 1983, and a master's degree in divinity from Meadville Lombard Theological School in 1991. An ordained Unitarian Universalist minister, he served churches in Ellsworth ME, Castine ME, Westborough MA, and Harvard MA. During the 1990s and early 2000s he was known in Maine for his advocacy for LGBTQ+ rights and marriage equality. Worth retired from the ministry in 2017.

== Electoral history ==
Known by his middle name, Mark Worth, a Democrat, was elected on November 8, 2022, in the 2022 Maine House of Representatives election against Republican opponent John Linnehan. He assumed office on December 7, 2022, and served on the Education Committee. He was defeated by Republican candidate Russ White in his 2024 re-election bid.

Maine House of Representatives
Preceded by Nicole Grohoski	Member of the Maine House of Representatives; 2022–2024	Succeeded by Russell White
