= Holly Eaton =

American politician

Holly Rae Eaton

Member of the Maine House of Representatives from the 15th district
- Incumbent
- Assumed office December 7, 2022
- Preceded by: Margaret O'Neil

Personal details
- Party: Democratic
- Education: Bachelor of Arts in English language and literature
- Alma mater: Regis College

Holly Rae Eaton is an American politician who has served as a member of the Maine House of Representatives since December 7, 2022. She represents Maine's 15th House district.

== Electoral history ==
She was elected on November 8, 2022, in the 2022 Maine House of Representatives election against Republican opponent Jason Joyce. She assumed office on December 7, 2022.

== Biography ==
Eaton graduated from Deer Isle-Stonington High School and earned a Bachelor of Arts in English language and literature from Regis College in 1999.

Maine House of Representatives
Preceded by Margaret O'Neil	Member of the Maine House of Representatives; 2022–present	Succeeded by incumbent
