= Kathy Shaw =

American politician

Member of the Maine House of Representatives from the 88th district
- In office December 7, 2022 – December 3, 2024
- Preceded by: Michael Lemelin
- Succeeded by: Quentin Chapman

Personal details
- Party: Democratic
- Profession: Farmer

Kathleen "Kathy" Shaw is an American politician who served as a member of the Maine House of Representatives from December 7, 2022 to December 3, 2024. She represented Maine's 88th House district.

== Electoral history ==
She was elected on November 8, 2022, in the 2022 Maine House of Representatives election against Republican opponent James Sorcek. She assumed office on December 7, 2022.

Maine House of Representatives
| Preceded by Michael Lemelin | Member of the Maine House of Representatives; 2022–2024 | Succeeded by Quentin Chapman |
