= James Gillway =

American politician

Member of the Maine House of Representatives from the 98th district
- In office 2010–2018
- Succeeded by: Scott Cuddy

Personal details
- Party: Republican

James S. Gillway is an American politician who served as a member of the Maine House of Representatives representing the 98th district from 2010 to 2018. The district comprises Frankfort, Swanville, Searsport and Winterport. Gillway is Town Manager of Searsport, Maine.
