= John Ducharme =

American politician

Member of the Maine House of Representatives from the 71st district
- Incumbent
- Assumed office December 7, 2022
- Preceded by: Sawin Millett

Personal details
- Party: Republican

John (Jack) E. Ducharme III is an American politician who has served as a member of the Maine House of Representatives since December 7, 2022. He represents Maine's 71st House district and currently serves as ranking Republican on the Joint Standing Committee for Appropriations and Financial Affairs. He graduated from Thomas College and earned his B.S. in Business Administration.
