= Russell White (American politician) =

American politician

Member of the Maine House of Representatives from the 13th district
- Incumbent
- Assumed office December 3, 2024
- Preceded by: James Worth

Personal details
- Party: Republican
- Website: www.russformaine.com

Russell (Russ) P. White is an American politician. He has served as a member of the Maine House of Representatives since December 2024. He represents the 13th district which contains the city of Ellsworth, Maine.
