= Stanley Zeigler =

American politician

Member of the Maine House of Representatives from the 40th district
- In office December 7, 2022 – December 3, 2024
- Preceded by: Rachel Talbot Ross
- Succeeded by: Michael Ray

Member of the Maine House of Representatives from the 96th district
- In office December 2016 – December 7, 2022
- Succeeded by: Michel Lajoie

Personal details
- Born: York, Pennsylvania, U.S.
- Party: Democratic
- Spouse: Bernice
- Children: 1
- Education: Southern Maine Community College (AA); Dickinson College (BA)

Stanley Paige Zeigler Jr. is an American politician who served as a member of the Maine House of Representatives from December 2016 to December 2024.

== Early career ==
He has worked as a merchant marine deck officer, a special needs teacher, a lumberjack, work with a drug rehabilitation center, an EMT, a road crew member, and a darkroom technician.

== Electoral history ==
He was first elected to the 96th district in the 2016 Maine House of Representatives election. He was reelected in the 2018 Maine House of Representatives election and the 2020 Maine House of Representatives election. He was redistricted to the 40th district and elected in the 2022 Maine House of Representatives election.

== Biography ==
Zeigler earned a bachelor's degree from Dickinson College in 1971 and an associate degree from Southern Maine Community College.
