= Margaret O'Neil =

American politician

Member of the Maine House of Representatives
- Incumbent
- Assumed office December 7, 2022
- Preceded by: Peter Lyford
- Constituency: 129th district
- In office December 7, 2016 – December 7, 2022
- Preceded by: Justin Chenette
- Succeeded by: Holly Eaton
- Constituency: 15th district

Personal details
- Born: Margaret M. O'Neil Portland, Maine, U.S.
- Party: Democratic
- Education: Catherine McAuley HS; Dalhousie University (BA); University of Maine School of Law
- Occupation: Attorney
- Website: Official website

Margaret "Maggie" O'Neil is an American politician who is currently representing part of the city of Saco in the 129th district in the Maine House of Representatives. She is in her fourth term having previously served three terms as the representative for the 15th district.

== Biography ==
O'Neil is an attorney and politician in the State of Maine.

O'Neil is an attorney at Maine-based Solidarity Law.

O'Neil grew up in Saco, Maine and attended Catherine McAuley High School in Portland, Maine. She graduated with a degree in Classics and History from the University of King's College in Halifax, Nova Scotia, Canada. O'Neil served in the Maine Conservation Corps and later worked as a park ranger at Ferry Beach State Park in Saco, Maine.

O'Neil was first elected to the Maine House of Representatives in November 2016, succeeding fellow Democrat Justin Chenette. At that time, she was the youngest woman serving in the Maine Legislature. She served as the House Chair of the Joint Standing Committee on Agriculture, Conservation and Forestry, as a member of the Environment and Natural Resources Committee, and as a member of the Government Oversight Committee.

While serving in the Legislature, O'Neil earned her Juris Doctor degree from the University of Maine School of Law.

O'Neil received the Electronic Privacy Information Center (EPIC) 2024 Champion of Freedom Award for her work to safeguard the right to privacy, open government, and democratic values with courage and integrity.

O'Neil received Sierra Club Maine's 2021 Public Service for the Environment Award in recognition of her legislative leadership and commitment to protecting the environment.

In December 2024, O'Neil revealed that she had been diagnosed with Acute Myeloid Leukemia and had begun chemotherapy.
