= Erin Sheehan =

American fashion designer

Member of the Maine House of Representatives from the 132nd district
- In office December 7, 2022 – December 4, 2024
- Preceded by: Nicole Grohoski (before re-dirstricting)
- Succeeded by: Ryan Fecteau

Member of the Maine House of Representatives from the 12th district
- In office December 2, 2020 – December 7, 2022
- Preceded by: Victoria Foley
- Succeeded by: Billy Bob Faulkingham (after re-districting)

Personal details
- Party: Democratic
- Spouse: Carson
- Education: Clark University (BA); Fashion Institute of Technology (AAS)

Erin R. Sheehan is an American politician, businesswoman, and former fashion designer serving as a member of the Maine House of Representatives from the 12th district. She assumed office on December 2, 2020. She was re-elected in 2022 from the 132nd district (which corresponds to the 12th district before the 2020 United States redistricting cycle) and retired in 2024.

== Education ==
Sheehan earned a Bachelor of Arts degree in geography and women's studies from the Clark University and an Associate of Applied Science degree in menswear design from the Fashion Institute of Technology. She was also a geology PhD candidate at the University of British Columbia.

== Career ==
Sheehan worked as a clothing designer for Tommy Hilfiger, John Varvatos, Evisu, Carter's, Fossil Group, and JCPenney. In 2019, she opened a wine bar with her husband in Biddeford, Maine. She was elected to the Maine House of Representatives in November 2020 and assumed office the following month.
