= Lori Gramlich =

American politician

Member of the Maine House of Representatives
- Incumbent
- Assumed office December 7, 2022
- Preceded by: Sherman Hutchins
- Constituency: 131st district
- In office December 5, 2018 – December 7, 2022
- Succeeded by: James Worth
- Constituency: 131st district

Personal details
- Party: Democratic
- Spouse: Bob Kelly
- Children: 1
- Education: Alfred University (B.A.) University of New England (MSW)

Lori Kathryn Gramlich is an American politician and social worker. She is serving in the Maine House of Representatives from the 131st district, as well as a faculty position at the University of Southern Maine. Gramlich was sexually abused as a child, and has proposed laws dealing with abuse, gender and environmental issues.

== Biography ==
Gramlich has lived in Maine for 35 years. She is married to Bob Kelly, and they have one child. Gramlich is also currently serving as a field coordinator and professor at the University of Southern Maine.

In 2018, Gramlich ran for the Maine House of Representatives, beating former Representative Sharri MacDonald in the general election. She assumed office on December 5, 2018. She ran for re-election in 2020, beating MacDonald by a narrower margin than in 2018.

== Political positions ==
=== Crime ===
Gramlich, herself a sexual abuse survivor, introduced legislation that made it easier for people who were victims of sexual abuse as children to file civil lawsuits against their abusers. While Maine had already eliminated the statute of limitations on civil lawsuits brought by these survivors in 2000, the bill did not apply retroactively, making it more difficult for people who were victims as children to bring a case. The bill introduced by Gramlich applied retroactively.

=== Environment ===
In 2021, Gramlich introduced a bill that would ban single-use plastic water bottles, with the exception of plastic bottles containing flavored or carbonated drinks. The bill would also not apply during public health or safety emergencies declared by the Governor of Maine. WMTW reported that Gramlich commented "We know there is a lot of plastic waste in our ocean, and this is a step in the direction to begin to hopefully decrease some of that". The bill faced significant opposition from the foodservice industry, as well as grocery stores, truckers, and bottled water producers. They cited the financial burden the ban would have on their businesses.

Gramlich also introduced a bill that banned the use of per- and polyfluoroalkyl substances, known as "PFAS" or "forever chemicals", the latter attributed to the long life of the plastic. The ban will take place in 2030, and starting in 2023, any manufacturer in Maine planning to use PFAS has to disclose their use and rationale.

=== Queer people ===
In 2019, Gramlich co-sponsored a bill that banned all forms of conversion therapy for queer people in Maine. When an amendment on the bill was proposed to only ban "aversive" methods of treatment, Gramlich spoke out against the amendment, calling all forms of conversion therapy "abusive, unethical and oppressive".

== Electoral history ==
=== 2020 ===
2020 Maine House of Representatives election, District 131
Primary election
Party	Candidate	Votes	%
Democratic	Lori Gramlich	1,262	100.0%
Total votes		1,262	100.0
General election
Democratic	Lori Gramlich	3,383	55.4%
Republican	Sharri MacDonald	2,721	44.6%
Total votes		6,104	100.0

=== 2018 ===
2018 Maine House of Representatives election, District 131
Primary election
Party	Candidate	Votes	%
Democratic	Lori Gramlich	714	70.3%
Democratic	Jay Kelley	302	29.7%
Total votes		1,016	100.0
General election
Democratic	Lori Gramlich	2,775	59.5%
Republican	Sharri MacDonald	1,889	40.5%
Total votes		4,664	100.0
