= Sharri MacDonald =

American politician

Sharri MacDonald (born 1971 or 1972) is an American politician from Maine. She served in the city council of Old Orchard Beach until 2013, when she was recalled after a controversial vote in the council to terminate Old Orchard Beach's Town Manager. She served in the Maine House of Representatives from 2012 to 2014 from District 132, as a member of the Republican Party.

== Career ==
=== Old Orchard Beach City Council ===
==== Recall ====
2013 Old Orchard Beach recall of Sharri MacDonald
Results
Choice	Votes	%
Yes	1,385	64.93%
No	748	35.07%
Valid votes	2,133	100.00%
Invalid or blank votes	0	0.00%
Total votes	2,133	100.00%

In March 2013, Town Manager Mark Pearson was terminated by a 4–3 vote of the Old Orchard Beach City Council, of which MacDonald was the chair. Disgruntled by the vote and lack of transparency, town citizens started a petition to recall the four members of the council who voted for the termination, including MacDonald. MacDonald commented that "People are upset, I understand", and said that she believes that "recalls lead to more divisiveness". In retaliation for the recall petition, another group started a recall petition against the three town members who had voted against Pearson's termination, meaning that all seven members of the Old Orchard Beach City Council were now facing a June recall election. Six of the seven members on the council, including MacDonald, were recalled.

=== Maine House of Representatives ===
MacDonald was first elected to the Maine House of Representatives in 2012, defeating Roxanne Victoria Frenette with 53% of the vote. She was defeated by George Hogan in 2014. Later, she ran against Lori Gramlich in District 13 in 2018 and 2020, losing both times.

==== Medicaid expansion ====
In 2013, MacDonald voted against a Medicaid expansion that she had previously voted for, one of only two Republicans to do so. The bill would have entered Maine in the Medicaid expansion program for three years, with the federal government covering the cost of the expansion.

==== Religious freedom ====
In February 2014, MacDonald was noted for being one of few Republicans to vote against a religious freedom bill that had originated in the Maine Senate. The bill would have prevented the state of Maine from passing a law that infringed upon religious freedom unless there was a "compelling state interest" to do so.

==== Economy ====
In 2013, MacDonald introduced a bill that would allow localities in Maine to increase the sales tax in their region, keeping the revenues. The bill passed 101-48 in the Maine House of Representatives, but failed in the Maine Senate.

== Electoral history ==
=== 2020 ===
2020 Maine House of Representatives election, District 13
Primary election
Party	Candidate	Votes	%
Republican	Sharri MacDonald	340	100.0%
Total votes		340	100.0%
General election
Democratic	Lori Gramlich	3,383	55.4%
Republican	Sharri MacDonald	2,721	44.6%
Total votes		6,104	100.0%

=== 2018 ===
2018 Maine House of Representatives election, District 13
Primary election
Party	Candidate	Votes	%
Republican	Sharri MacDonald	447	100.0%
Total votes		447	100.0%
General election
Democratic	Lori Gramlich	2,775	59.5%
Republican	Sharri MacDonald	1,889	40.5%
Total votes		4,664	100.0%

=== 2014 ===
2014 Maine House of Representatives election, District 132
Party	Candidate	Votes	%
Democratic	George Hogan	2,462	58.58%
Republican	Sharri MacDonald (Incumbent)	1,741	41.42%
Total votes		4,203	100.0%

=== 2012 ===
2012 Maine House of Representatives election, District 132
Primary election
Party	Candidate	Votes	%
Republican	Sharri MacDonald	329	100.0%
Total votes		329	100.0%
General election
Republican	Sharri MacDonald	2,591	52.56%
Democratic	Roxanne Victoria Frenette	2,296	46.59%
Other	Write-ins	42	0.85%
Total votes		4,929	100.0%
