= Maureen Terry =

American politician from Maine

Mo Terry

Majority Leader of the Maine House of Representatives
- In office December 7, 2022 – December 3, 2024
- Preceded by: Michelle Dunphy
- Succeeded by: Matt Moonen

Member of the Maine House of Representatives
- In office December 7, 2022 – December 3, 2024
- Preceded by: Shelley Rudnicki
- Succeeded by: Parnell Terry
- Constituency: 108th district
- In office December 7, 2016 – December 7, 2022
- Preceded by: Linda Sanborn
- Succeeded by: Jim Dill
- Constituency: 26th district

Personal details
- Party: Democratic
- Education: Mount Ida College; Art Institute of New York City

Maureen Fitzgerald Terry is an American small business owner and politician from Maine. A Democrat from Gorham, Maine, she served as the Majority Leader of the Maine House of Representatives from 2022 to 2024.

Maine House of Representatives
Preceded by Michelle Dunphy	Majority Leader of the Maine House of Representatives; 2022–2024	Succeeded by Matt Moonen
