= Regional School Unit 22 =

School district in Maine, United States

Address
- 24 Main Road North Hampden, Maine, 4444; United States
- Coordinates: 44°42′N 68°56′W

District information
- Type: Public
- Grades: PreK–12
- NCES District ID: 2314815

Students and staff
- Students: 2,287 (2020–2021)
- Teachers: 166.74 (on an FTE basis)
- Staff: 229.4 (on an FTE basis)
- Student–teacher ratio: 13.72:1

Other information
- Website: www.rsu22.us

The Regional School Unit 22 (R.S.U. 22), known as Maine School Administrative District 22 (M.S.A.D. 22) before July 1, 2013, is a school district in the U.S. state of Maine, serving residents of the towns of Hampden, Newburgh, Winterport, and Frankfort.

== Schools ==
=== Elementary schools ===
- Leroy H. Smith School in Winterport
- Earl McGraw School (K–2) in Hampden
- George B. Weatherbee School (3–5) in Hampden

=== Middle schools ===
- Reeds Brook Middle School in Hampden
- Wagner Middle School in Winterport

=== High schools ===
- Hampden Academy, serving all Newburgh, Winterport, Frankfort and Hampden students
