= Billy Bob Faulkingham =

Republican politician from Maine

Minority Leader of the Maine House of Representatives
- Incumbent
- Assumed office December 7, 2022
- Preceded by: Kathleen Dillingham

Member of the Maine House of Representatives
- Incumbent
- Assumed office December 7, 2022
- Preceded by: Erin Sheehan
- Constituency: 12th district
- In office December 5, 2018 – December 7, 2022
- Preceded by: Richard Malaby
- Succeeded by: Heidi Sampson
- Constituency: 136th district

Personal details
- Born: William Faulkingham
- Party: Republican
- Education: Southern Maine Community College (attended)
- Website: State House

Military service
- Branch/service: United States Marine Corps
- Years of service: 1999–2002

William Robert Faulkingham is an American politician and lobsterman who has served in the Maine House of Representatives from the 12th district since 2022. A Republican, Faulkingham served in the U.S. Marines. He is the Minority Leader of the lower house. He previously served in the 136th district from 2018 to 2022.

== Education and career ==
Faulkingham began lobster fishing with his father at age three.

He obtained a certificate in plumbing from the Southern Maine Technical College and served in the United States Marine Corps from 1999 to 2002. Faulkingham is currently a self-employed fisherman.

In 2018, Faulkingham was elected to the Maine House of Representatives from the 136th district. In 2022, he ran for the 12th district, winning 2,725 (60.4%) against Independent candidate Roy Gott's 1,787 (39.6%). He was elected House minority leader by fellow Republicans. He was sworn in as both on December 7, 2022.

=== Bruce Poliquin advertisement ===
Faulkingham appeared in a television advertisement for former Republican congressman Bruce Poliquin's 2022 campaign to regain his former seat, in which he criticized incumbent Democrat Jared Golden. In the advertisement, he was not named or identified as a Republican state legislator seeking reelection, which became the subject of criticism. Poliquin's campaign said doing so was necessary to comply with Maine campaign finance laws with regard to Faulkingham's campaign.

== Personal life ==
Faulkingham is a resident of Winter Harbor, Maine. He is married to Carrie Faulkingham, and the couple have three children.

In 2003, Faulkingham pleaded guilty to criminal mischief and disorderly conduct after throwing a bucket of human feces at other people. He was found guilty of driving under the influence in 2008.

On September 15, 2023, Faulkingham's lobster boat capsized due to high seas ahead of Hurricane Lee, which made landfall in nearby Nova Scotia the next day. He and one other person were rescued by other lobster boats.

== Electoral history ==
2018 Maine House District 136 Republican Primary
Party	Candidate	Votes	%
Republican	Billy Bob Faulkingham	711	100.0%
Total votes		711	100.0%

2018 Maine House District 136 General Election
Party	Candidate	Votes	%
Republican	Billy Bob Faulkingham	2,308	57.5%
Democratic	Kylie Bragdon	1,704	42.5%
Total votes		4,012	100.0%

2020 Maine House District 136 Republican Primary
Party	Candidate	Votes	%
Republican	Billy Bob Faulkingham	897	100%
Total votes		897	100.0%

2020 Maine House District 136 General Election
Party	Candidate	Votes	%
Republican	Billy Bob Faulkingham	3,198	63.5%
Democratic	Antonio Blasi	1,835	36.5%
Total votes		5,033	100.0%

2022 Maine House District 12 (Note: In Maine, legislative districts are renumbered after every United States Census, alternatively from north to south, then south to north. Following the 2020 United States census, House District 136 was re-numbered as District 12.) Republican Primary
Party	Candidate	Votes	%
Republican	Billy Bob Faulkingham	744	100%
Total votes		744	100.0%

2022 Maine House District 12 General Election
Party	Candidate	Votes	%
Republican	Billy Bob Faulkingham	2,725	60.4%
Independent	Roy Gott	1,787	39.6
Total votes		4,512	100.0%

== Notes ==
Maine House of Representatives
Preceded by Kathleen Dillingham	Minority Leader of the Maine House of Representatives; 2022–present	Incumbent
