= Drew Gattine =

American politician

Chair of the Maine Democratic Party
- In office March 20, 2021 – January 22, 2023
- Preceded by: Kathleen Marra
- Succeeded by: Bev Uhlenhake

Member of the Maine House of Representatives
- Incumbent
- Assumed office December 7, 2022
- Preceded by: Laura Supica
- Constituency: 126th district
- In office December 5, 2012 – December 2, 2020
- Preceded by: Richard Malaby
- Succeeded by: Morgan Rielly
- Constituency: 34th district

Personal details
- Born: November 30, 1962 (age 63)
- Party: Democratic
- Education: Colgate University (BA); Columbia University (JD)

Andrew M. Gattine (born November 30, 1962) is an American politician who served as chair of the Maine Democratic Party. He was previously a member of the Maine House of Representatives for the 34th district from 2012 to 2020.

== Career ==
Gattine is from Westbrook, Maine. In the 128th Maine Legislature he served as the chair of the House Appropriations and Financial Affairs Committee. He previously served as the chair of the House Health and Human Services Committee. In August 2016, Paul LePage, the governor of Maine, left an "obscene, threatening" voicemail for Gattine in which he accused Gattine of calling him racist. LePage later stated that he wished he could challenge Gattine to a duel.

Party political offices
Preceded by Kathleen Marra	Chair of the Maine Democratic Party; 2021–2023	Succeeded by Bev Uhlenhake
