= Michel Lajoie =

American politician

Member of the Maine House of Representatives from the 96th district
- Incumbent
- Assumed office December 2020
- Preceded by: Stanley Zeigler

Member of the Maine House of Representatives from the 58th district
- In office December 2014 – December 2020

Member of the Maine House of Representatives from the 71st district
- In office December 2008 – December 2014

Personal details
- Party: Democratic
- Spouse: Rita
- Children: 3
- Education: associate degree

Michel "Mike" Lajoie is an American politician who has served as a member of the Maine House of Representatives. He currently represents Maine's 96th House district.

== Electoral history ==
He was first elected to the 71st district in 2008. He was reelected in 2010 and 2012. He was redistricted to the 58th district and was elected to the seat in 2014 and reelected in 2016. He was redistricted to the 98th district and was elected to the seat in 2020 and reelected in 2022.

== Biography ==
Lajoie graduated from Lewiston High School and earned an associate degree in 1991 from Southern Maine Technical College. He was chief of the Lewiston Fire Department for over 31 years.
