= Randall Hall =

American politician

Member of the Maine House of Representatives from the 74th district
- Incumbent
- Assumed office December 7, 2022
- Preceded by: Sheila Lyman

Member of the Maine House of Representatives from the 114th district
- In office December 5, 2018 – December 7, 2022
- Preceded by: Russell Black
- Succeeded by: Benjamin Collings

Personal details
- Born: East Dixfield, Maine
- Party: Republican

Randall C. Hall is an American politician who has served as a member of the Maine House of Representatives since December 7, 2022. He represents Maine's 74th House district. He formerly represented District 114.

== Legal issues ==
On May 26, 2026, Hall pleaded guilty to violating Maine's clean elections law. He had falsified 17 signatures on his application to get clean elections funding through the state's clean elections fund for his 2024 re-election campaign.
