= Morgan Rielly (politician) =

American politician and author

Member of the Maine House of Representatives
- Incumbent
- Assumed office December 2, 2020
- Preceded by: Drew Gattine
- Constituency: 34th district
- In office December 7, 2022 – Present
- Preceded by: Barbara A. Cardone
- Constituency: 127th district

Personal details
- Born: Westbrook, Maine, U.S.
- Education: Bowdoin College (BA)

Morgan J. Rielly is an American politician and author serving as a member of the Maine House of Representatives from the 127th district. First elected to represent the 34th District in November 2020, he assumed office on December 2, 2020. Due to redistricting, his district was redrawn to be the 127th district, which he won in the 2022 Maine House of Representatives election.

Born and raised in Westbrook, Maine, Rielly attended Westbrook High School. He earned a Bachelor of Arts degree in religion and government from Bowdoin College. Outside of politics, Rielly has worked as a paralegal with an immigration law firm. He authored his first book, about World War II veterans from Maine in 2014. His second, about immigrants in Maine, was co-written by Reza Jalali and released in 2021. Rielly was elected to the Maine House of Representatives in November 2020 and assumed office on December 2, 2020. In 2021, Rielly drafted legislation that would create a public service program in Maine, with the goal of retaining local college graduates in the state.

== Electoral history ==
2020 Maine House District 34 General Election
Party	Candidate	Votes	%
Democratic	Morgan Rielly	4,371	100.0%
Total votes		4,371	100.0%
Democratic hold			

2022 Maine House District 127 General Election
Party	Candidate	Votes	%
Democratic	Morgan Rielly	2,491	71.8%
Republican	Ryan Poitras	980	28.2%
Total votes		3,471	100.0%
Democratic hold			

2024 Maine House District 127 General Election
Party	Candidate	Votes	%
Democratic	Morgan Rielly	3,027	65.3%
Republican	Ryan Poitras	1,352	29.1%
	Blank	260	5.6%
Total votes		4,639	100.0%
Democratic hold			
