= Richard Rosen =

American politician and businessman

Member of the Maine Senate from the 31st district
- In office 2004–2012
- Preceded by: Edward Youngblood
- Succeeded by: Edward Youngblood

Personal details
- Born: Castine, Maine, U.S.
- Party: unaffiliated
- Profession: Businessman

Richard Rosen is an American politician and businessman who served as member of the Maine Senate from the 31st District, where he represented part of Penobscot and Hancock counties, including the population centers of Bucksport and Brewer.

== Career ==
Rosen was first elected to the Maine State Senate in 2004 after serving from 1998 to 2004 in the Maine House of Representatives. In 2010 Rosen became Senate Chairman of the Appropriations and Financial Affairs Committee. In August 2013, Rosen announced that he would seek the Republican nomination for Maine's 2nd congressional district in 2014 to replace Mike Michaud, who ran for governor. He withdrew from the race on November 30, citing a preference to remain in the state of Maine.

Rosen was presented with the 2011 Adoptive & Foster Families of Maine Outstanding Legislative Advocate of the Year award In 2012 he received the Sunshine Award from Maine's Freedom of Information Coalition and was named a Margaret Chase Smith Policy Center Distinguished Maine Policy Fellow. In 2013 Rosen received the Bangor Region Chamber of Commerce Catherine Lebowitz Award for Public Service During the 125th Senate session, Rosen was a former member of the conservative American Legislative Exchange Council (ALEC), having formerly served as Maine state leader. In addition, Rosen was an appointed member of the National Conference of State Legislatures (NCSL) Budget and Review Committee. He is also a member of the researched based Pew Center on The States, Fiscal Leaders Committee. He owns Rosens, a store in downtown Bucksport. His store was named 2002 Merchant of the Year by the Maine Merchants Association. In 2012 Rosen was named Director of the Governor's Office of Policy & Management. In 2014 Governor Paul LePage nominated and the Maine Senate confirmed Rosen as Commissioner of the Department of Administrative and Financial Services. Rosen resigned in 2017.In 2020 Rosen was named CFO and VP of Financial & Institutional Services at Maine Maritime Academy. In 2024 Rosen was named interim CFO at the Maine Community College System.

Rosen served as a board member of the Retail Association of Maine (RAM), former President of Northeast Historic Film (NHF), a regional film archives and study center, Trustee and Board Chair of Acadia Hospital in Bangor, Maine, board member for Bucksport Regional Health Center., appointed by Maine Governor Janet Mills and confirmed by Maine Senate in 2019 to a 3-year term on the Maine Indian Tribal-State Commission

Rosen endorsed Mitt Romney for president in the 2012 election.

In May 2014, Rosen was named interim finance commissioner, replacing longtime commissioner Sawin Millett, who retired.
