= Sawin Millett =

American politician

Member of the Maine House of Representatives from the 71st (2018-2022) since 2022 the 81st district
- In office December 5, 2018 – December 3, 2024
- Preceded by: Tom J. Winsor
- Succeeded by: Peter Wood

Member of the Maine House of Representatives from the 95th district
- In office December 4, 2002 – December 1, 2010
- Preceded by: Tom J. Winsor
- Succeeded by: Tom J. Winsor

Personal details
- Born: Howard Sawin Millett Jr. October 8, 1937 (age 88) Waterford, Maine, U.S.
- Party: Republican
- Spouse: Barbara (m. 1957)
- Education: Bates College (BS); University of Maine (MEd)

Howard Sawin Millett Jr. (born October 8, 1937) is a Maine politician. A Republican, Millett served as the Commissioner of Administrative and Financial Services in the administration of Governor Paul LePage from 2011 to 2014. In January 2011, Millett was unanimously approved as Commissioner by the Maine Senate, with key Democrats also endorsing his appointment. In December 2011, a poll of policymakers by the Bangor Daily News ranked Millett as the ninth most influential person in Maine politics.

== Government career ==
Millett served in the administrations of four separate governors (Longley, McKernan, King and LePage) with two different political affiliations (two Independents and two Republicans). Millett advanced in the field of education until he became commissioner of education for Maine's first independent governor, James Longley. He was appointed to the position in 1975 at the age of 37 and served until 1979. In 1979, Republican Governor John McKernan appointed Millett Commissioner of the state finance department. During his time in the McKernan administration, the government was shut down due to the inability to agree on a budget. He also served from 1995 to 2000 as Associate Commissioner of the Department of Mental Health/Mental Retardation and Substance Abuse Services for Independent Angus King. In 2011, Millett was unanimously confirmed as Commissioner of Administrative and Financial Services by the Maine Senate after being selected by Republican Paul LePage.

Millett announced his retirement on April 3, 2014, to be effective on May 30. He stated he wanted to spend more time with his family and in his hometown. Governor LePage praised his service and knowledge of state budgeting. Millett retired in May 2014 and was replaced by Richard Rosen.

== Legislative career ==
Millett first served in the legislature from 1969 to 1972. In 2002, Millett won a seat in the Maine House of Representatives. Unable to run for his seat again in 2010, he challenged John Patrick for Senate District 14 and was defeated. In 2018, he won election to the Maine House of Representatives from District 71.

== Personal ==
Millett was born in Waterford, Maine in Oxford County, Maine and his family settled on a farm in Dixmont in Penobscot County when he was in fourth grade. Millett's father was a superintendent of schools and his mother was primarily a homemaker. He was one of five boys in his family. Millett, despite being an avid baseball fan and having lived his entire life in Maine, became a supporter of the St. Louis Cardinals during the 1946 World Series in which the Cardinals beat the Boston Red Sox. He graduated from Carmel High School in Carmel, Maine in 1955 and attended the same college as his father, Bates College. After graduating, he returned to Penobscot County and began teaching at Hermon High School. He continued teaching in the district until 1971.

In 1977, while serving as Commissioner of Education, Millett and his wife bought a home in Manchester, Maine to cut down on his daily commute for work in Augusta, but the couple disliked living in a subdivision so much that he and his wife bought 25 acres of land next to his parents farm in Waterford and built a house to live in. He could barely stand to address the Maine Senate during his 2011 confirmation hearing due to an infection after knee replacement surgery. Shortly after being appointed commissioner, Millett had to miss work due to a second infection in his knee; he was temporarily replaced by Ryan Low, who had served as Commissioner of Finance under Democrat John Baldacci. Low said of Millett "I would do just about anything for him...There's no one more of an expert on budgeting and legislative process; but even more than that, he's a genuinely nice person."
