= Jim Dill =

American politician and professor of entomology

Member of the Maine House of Representatives from the 26th district
- Incumbent
- Assumed office December 7, 2022
- Preceded by: Maureen Terry

Member of the Maine Senate from the 5th district
- In office December 3, 2014 – December 7, 2022
- Preceded by: Emily Cain
- Succeeded by: Russell Black

Personal details
- Party: Democratic
- Education: University of Maine; Purdue University (Ph.D)
- Occupation: Professor of entomology; pest management specialist

James F. Dill is an American entomologist, politician and professor from Maine. A Democrat, Dill serves Maine House of Representatives District 26, comprising Bradley, the Penobscot Nation Voting District, and Old Town. Dill was first elected to the Maine Legislature in 2010 when he represented Maine House District 14 for two terms before running for the Senate District 5 in 2014. He completed his fourth term in the Maine Senate in 2022. Dill works as the pest management specialist for the University of Maine Cooperative Extension and is a professor in the School of Biological Sciences at the University of Maine. He is considered one of the foremost experts on insect pests in Maine and one of the pioneers of integrated pest management (IPM) in the state.

== Education & career ==
Dill received both a Bachelor of Science and a Master of Science in entomology from the University of Maine and a PhD in entomology from Purdue University in 1979. He has worked as a pest management specialist for the University of Maine Extension since 1981. Dill coordinates the Extension Diagnostic and Research Laboratory, the Integrated Pest Management, and the Pesticide Safety Education programs. He also serves as a legislative and congressional resource liaison for the university.

Dill also serves as the state of Maine's first Integrated pest management coordinator. In 2021, he was awarded the University of Maine Presidential Public Engagement Award.

=== Maine Legislature ===
Dill serves Maine Senate District 5, located in Penobscot County, Maine.

Dill was first elected to the Maine House of Representatives in 2010. He served two terms tin the House before running for Senate District 5 in 2014. Dill is currently serving his fourth term in the Maine Senate.

== Personal life ==
Dill lives in Old Town, Maine where he has served on the boards of both the Regional School District 34 and Maine Vocational Region #4 since 2003. Dill is a member of the Orono-Old Town Kiwanis. He has been treated for Lyme disease twice.

== Electoral history ==
2010 Maine House District 14 Democratic primary
Party	Candidate	Votes	%
Democratic	Jim Dill	512	60.9%
Democratic	Richard Blanchard	329	39.1%
Total votes		841	100%

2010 Maine House District 14 general election
Party	Candidate	Votes	%
Democratic	Jim Dill	1,964	64.2%
Republican	Daniel Phillips	1,093	35.8%
Total votes		3,057	100%

2012 Maine House District 14 Democratic primary
Party	Candidate	Votes	%
Democratic	Jim Dill		
Total votes			

2012 Maine House District 14 general election
Party	Candidate	Votes	%
Democratic	Jim Dill	2,577	65.6%
Republican	Carol Klitch	1,351	34.4%
Total votes		3,928	100%

2014 Maine Senate District 5 Democratic primary
Party	Candidate	Votes	%
Democratic	Jim Dill	1,351	64.6
Democratic	Herbert Clark	739	35.4
Total votes		2,090	100%

2014 Maine Senate District 5 general election
Party	Candidate	Votes	%
Democratic	Jim Dill	8,638	54.7%
Republican	Mitchell McLaughlin	6,052	38.3%
Total votes		15,805 (Note: Includes 1,115 blank votes.)	100%

2016 Maine Senate District 5 Democratic primary
Party	Candidate	Votes	%
Democratic	Jim Dill		
Total votes			100%

2016 Maine Senate District 5 general election
Party	Candidate	Votes	%
Democratic	Jim Dill	12,117	62.6%
Republican	Brent Baber	7,241	37.4%
Total votes		19,358	100%

2018 Maine Senate District 5 Democratic primary
Party	Candidate	Votes	%
Democratic	Jim Dill	2,668	100%
Total votes		2,668	100%

2018 Maine Senate District 5 general election
Party	Candidate	Votes	%
Democratic	Jim Dill	8,789	55.7
Republican	Debbi Perkins	5,855	37.1%
Socialist	Maia Dendinger	1,124	7.1%
Total votes		15,768	100%

2020 Maine Senate District 5 Democratic primary
Party	Candidate	Votes	%
Democratic	Jim Dill	3,447	100.0%
Total votes		3,447	100.0%

2020 Maine Senate District 5 general election
Party	Candidate	Votes	%
Democratic	Jim Dill	11,571	58.0%
Republican	Christin Ireland	8,381	42.0%
Total votes		19,952	100%
