= Amy Arata =

American politician

- Preceded by: Eleanor Espling

Member of the Maine House of Representatives from the 104th district
- Incumbent
- Assumed office December 7, 2022

Member of the Maine House of Representatives from the 65th district
- In office December 5, 2018 – December 7, 2022
- Preceded by: Eleanor Espling

Personal details
- Born: Amy Bradstreet Winslow, Maine, U.S.
- Party: Republican
- Spouse: Michael Arata
- Relations: Richard Bradstreet (father)
- Children: 3
- Education: Gordon College (BA); University of California, Davis (MS)

Amy B. Arata is an American politician serving as a member of the Maine House of Representatives from the 104th district. She assumed office on December 5, 2018.

== Early life and education ==
Arata was born in Winslow, Maine and attended Lawrence High School. She earned a Bachelor of Science degree in biology from Gordon College and a Master of Science in genetics from the University of California, Davis.

== Career ==
After graduating from Gordon College, Arata worked at the Naval Blood Research Laboratory at Boston University. Arata later worked in the Dept. of Pathology, Microbiology, and Immunology, School of Veterinary Medicine, University of California, Davis. While there, Arata designed and published a method to distinguish between Taylorella asinigenitalis and Taylorella equigenitalis based on variations of their 16S rRNA sequences. Arata was elected to the MSAD 15 school board and was also appointed by the Maine Governor and confirmed by the Maine Senate as a member of the Maine State Board of Education. Arata was elected to the Maine House of Representatives in November 2018 and assumed office in December 2018.

In January 2019, Arata sponsored a bill that would revise a state law governing the dissemination of obscene materials to minors. Arata later stated that she was inspired to sponsor the bill after her teenage son was assigned to read Kafka on the Shore, which perpetuated the myth that rape is mutually pleasurable.

== Personal life ==
Arata and her husband, Michael, have three children and live in New Gloucester, Maine. Arata's father, Richard Bradstreet, is also a member of the Maine House of Representatives.
