= Valli Geiger =

American politician

Member of the Maine House of Representatives
- Incumbent
- Assumed office December 2, 2020
- Preceded by: Pinny Beebe-Center
- Constituency: 93rd district (2020–2022); 42nd district (2022–present)

Personal details
- Born: December 2, 1955 (age 70) Chanute Field, Illinois, U.S.
- Party: Democratic
- Spouse: Greg Marley
- Children: 1
- Education: Niagara University (BS); University of Massachusetts, Amherst (attended); Boston Architectural College (MS)

Valli D. Geiger (December 2, 1955) is an American politician and nurse who has served in the Maine House of Representatives since 2020. A member of the Democratic Party, Geiger is currently running for a fourth term.

== Early life and education ==
Geiger was born on Chanute Air Force Base in Champaign County, Illinois. She earned a Bachelor of Science degree in nursing from Niagara University in 1977 and studied public administration and public health at the University of Massachusetts Amherst. She earned a certification in sustainable development from the Fielding Graduate Institute and earned a Master of Science in sustainable design from the Boston Architectural College in 2014.

== Career ==
=== Early career ===
After earning her bachelor's degree, Geiger worked as a nurse at the Pen Bay Medical Center in Rockport, Maine. She was the director of quality improvement at the Maine Primary Care Association and director the Health Reach's Hospice Program. She also owned V Consulting.

=== Political career ===
Geiger previously served on the Rockland City Council and as mayor of Rockland. In 2020, she was elected to the Maine House of Representatives from a district that included the towns of Owls Head and Rockland. As a legislator, Geiger has pushed to improve tracking and testing of rape kits.

== Personal life ==
Geiger is married to Greg Marley, former director of suicide prevention at the National Alliance on Mental Illness. Geiger and Marley have one son.

== Electoral history ==
2020 Maine House of Representatives 93rd district election
Primary election
Party	Candidate	Votes	%
Democratic	Valli Geiger	1,174	100.00%
Total votes		1,174	100.00%
	Blanks	238	
General election
Democratic	Valli Geiger	2,711	55.24%
Republican	Michael J. Mullins	2,197	44.76%
Total votes		4,908	100.00%
	Blanks	248	

2022 Maine House of Representatives 42nd district election
Primary election
Party	Candidate	Votes	%
Democratic	Valli Geiger (incumbent)	404	100.00%
Total votes		404	100.00%
	Blanks	45	
General election
Democratic	Valli Geiger (incumbent)	2,784	65.54%
Republican	Roger V. Tranfaglia	1,464	34.46%
Total votes		4,248	100.00%

2024 Maine House of Representatives 42nd district election
Primary election
Party	Candidate	Votes	%
Democratic	Valli Geiger (incumbent)	363	100.00%
Total votes		363	100.00%
	Blanks	27	
General election
Democratic	Valli Geiger (incumbent)	2,992	60.73%
Republican	Jamie L. Hopkins	1,935	39.27%
Total votes		4,927	100.00%
	Blanks	282	
