= Justin Chenette =

American politician (born 1991)

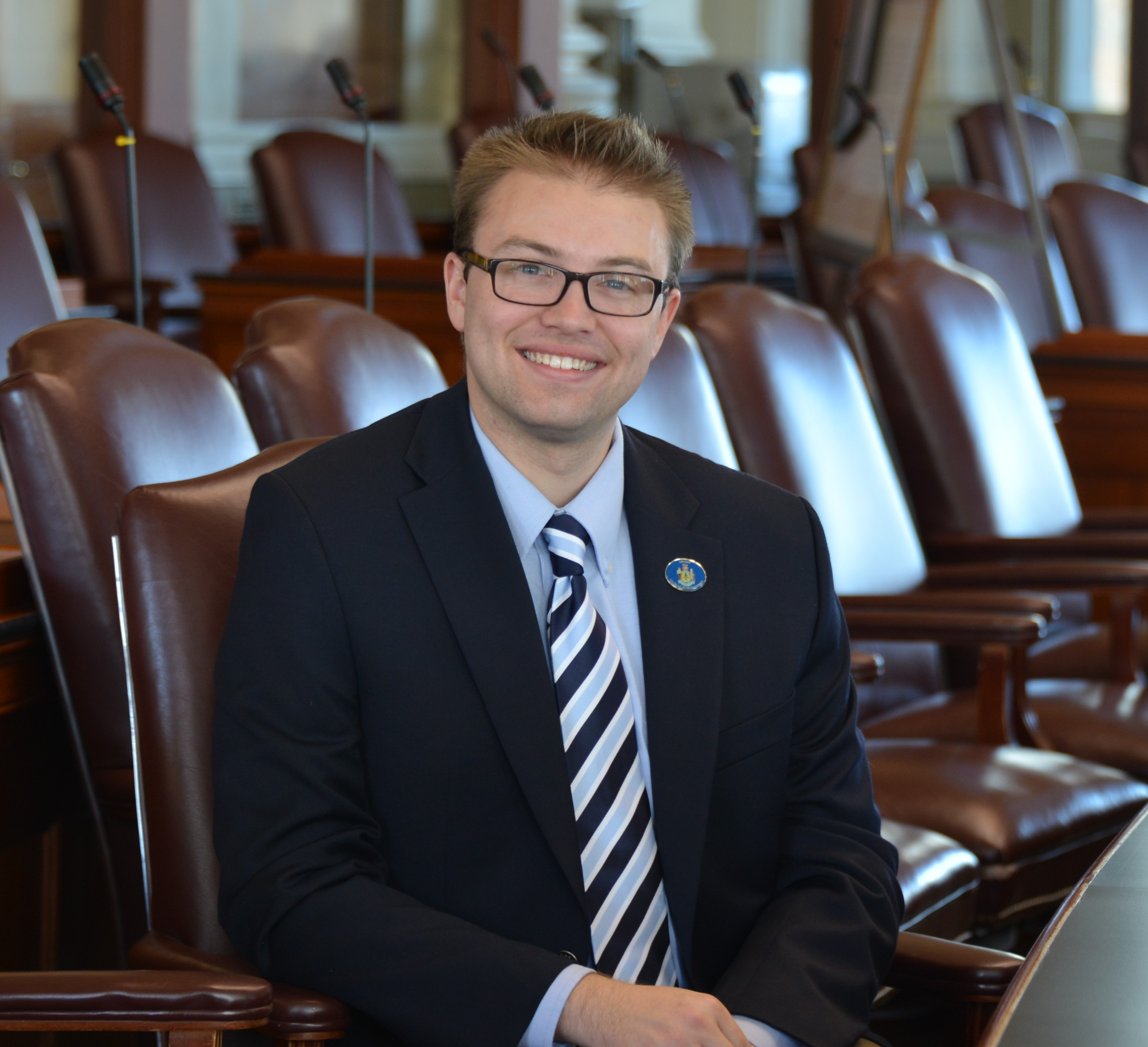
- Justin Chenette in 2016

Member of the Maine Senate from the 31st district
- In office December 7, 2016 – December 2, 2020
- Preceded by: Linda Valentino
- Succeeded by: Donna Bailey

Member of the Maine House of Representatives from the 15th district
- In office December 2012 – December 2016
- Preceded by: Linda Valentino
- Succeeded by: Margaret M. O'Neil

Member of the Maine State Board of Education
- In office 2008–2009

Member of the York County, Maine Commission for District 3
- Incumbent
- Assumed office January 2023

Personal details
- Born: April 23, 1991 (age 35)
- Party: Democratic
- Spouse: Eduard Chenette (m. 2016)
- Occupation: Entrepreneur & Non-Profit Professional
- Website: www.justinchenette.com

Justin Chenette (born April 23, 1991) is an American politician from Maine. Chenette, a Democrat, formerly represented District 31 in the Maine Senate. Chenette made history at age 21 becoming the youngest legislator in Maine, and was one of five openly gay members of the Maine Legislature.

Chenette was also youngest openly gay legislator in the United States. Owing to this, The Advocate magazine named Chenette "an architect of the next decade" and listed him among the 40 Under 40 most accomplished leaders throughout the country in 2013.

== Early life and education ==
Chenette was born in St. Albans, Vermont. He is the son of Jennifer Minthorn (née McIsaac) and Dr. Steven Mark Chenette. His father died in 2000 when Chenette was nine years old from complications of diabetes. Chenette's stepfather was a Saco City Councilor, Alan Minthorn.

Chenette graduated high school from Thornton Academy in Saco, Maine. While in high school, Chenette was the station manager, executive producer, anchor, reporter, and host of Thornton Academy's TATV Channel 3, Saco's educational television station. TATV is one of the only student-run educational TV stations in the country. At the station, Chenette hosted a public affairs show he created, The Issue and produced three live election results shows. During his tenure as a TATV participant, he made special notice of the fact that he had medical procedures intervene with his normal male hormonal functions. Several of his peers recall instance of his declaration of castrate type behavior during high-school meetings of the televised program. His work was recognized by the Student Television Network by honoring Chenette as the 2009 Student Broadcast Journalist of the Year.

Chenette was selected as a Gannett Journalism Scholar for two consecutive years in 2009 and 2010. After interning at WPFO FOX 23 in Portland, Maine in 2011, Chenette was offered a job created as the assistant morning producer of their news program, Good Day Maine.

Chenette took courses through the early studies program at the University College at Saco and at the University of Southern Maine. He went to graduate a semester early from Lyndon State College with a bachelor's degree in broadcasting, Associate degree in TV news, and minors in political science and multimedia communications.

In 2019, Chenette completed Harvard University's John F. Kennedy School of Government program for Senior Executives in State and Local Government as a David Bohnett LGBTQ Victory Institute Leadership Fellow.

== Early career ==
In 2008, Governor John Baldacci appointed Chenette to the Maine State Board of Education making him the first student member in the history of the board at age 17. In his 16-month term, Chenette pushed for civic engagement curriculum, a universal grading system, increased drug prevention, and to shore up the educational disparity between northern and southern Maine. Chenette served on the Student Voices Committee.

In May 2012, Chenette was elected at the Maine State Democratic Convention as an at-large delegate to the 2012 Democratic National Convention down in Charlotte, North Carolina. Chenette was one of the youngest members of Maine's delegation to the DNC.

Chenette served as an intern for Republican U.S. Senator Olympia Snowe prior to her retirement in 2012.

== Maine House of Representatives ==
=== 2012 election ===
Chenette announced his first run for public office at the age 20, while he was still attending college, when the sitting State Representative Linda Valentino was termed out and seeking the State Senate seat. He faced a Democratic challenger in the June Primary.

Chenette was elected in 2012 to the Maine House of Representatives after winning the Democratic primary for the seat against challenger Sonya Lundh-Gay with 78% of the vote, and going on to win the general election over Republican challenger Roland Wyman with 60% of the vote.

=== 2014 election ===
Chenette was unopposed in his re-election to the newly redrawn district 15 in the June Primary. He went on to face Saco Republican Chairwoman Carol Patterson in the General Election replacing Republican candidate Frederick Fortier who dropped out of the race. There was controversy surrounding the transparency of his replacement in selecting Patterson. In what many considered to be a wave election for Republicans, Chenette won re-election two percentage points higher than his previous election with 62% of the vote.

=== Committee assignments and caucuses ===
- Criminal Justice & Public Safety Committee (2014–Present)
- State & Local Government Committee (2012-2014)
- Legislative Youth Caucus, Co-Chair (2012–Present)

=== 2020 ===
On August 11, 2020, Chenette announced that he was withdrawing from the Senate District 31 race. Instead of running for re-election, Chenette in a release said he planned to empower the next generation of voters through the launch of a civics education organization called the Maine Democracy Project, would publish a full-length children’s book version of his state government coloring book The Great Whoopie Pie Debate, and would be working to help retain Democratic majorities in the Legislature. However, in 2022, Chenette sought and won York County (ME) District 3 Commissioner seat.

== Electoral history ==
Maine Senate Primary Election 2016
Party	Candidate	Votes	%
Democratic	Justin Chenette	1,321	56%
Democratic	Barry Hobbins	1,042	44%

Maine House of Representatives District 15 General Election 2014
Party	Candidate	Votes	%
Democratic	Justin Chenette	2,451	62%
Republican	Carol Patterson	1,508	38%

Maine House of Representatives District 134 General Election 2012
Party	Candidate	Votes	%
Democratic	Justin Chenette	3,074	60%
Republican	Roland Wyman	2,028	40%

Maine House of Representatives District 134 Primary Election 2012
Party	Candidate	Votes	%
Democratic	Justin Chenette	543	78%
Democratic	Sonya Lundh-Gay	154	22%

== Personal life ==
In 2016, Chenette married Eduard Chenette, an environmental engineer.

Chenette works at the Journal Tribune, a newspaper located in Biddeford, as their digital advertising executive. There he started two new initiatives, JT CARES, a nonprofit charitable arm of the paper, and JT MEDIA, a full-service marketing arm that provides a range of new media services to businesses. In 2013, Chenette started his first small business, Chenette Media LLC, a multimedia public relations company based in Saco. He previously worked at Rocky Coast Marketing, a full-service advertising and marketing firm, as vice-president of social media, specializing in web creation/management, media relations, and social media outreach.
