= Christopher Kessler =

Maine State Representative

Member of the Maine House of Representatives from the 121st district
- Incumbent
- Assumed office 2022
- Succeeded by: Lucy Perkins (elect)

Christopher Kessler is an American politician and energy auditor from the U.S. state of Maine. He is the representative for Maine House District 32. He is on the Joint Standing Committee on Energy Utilities and Technology.

In November 2022, Kessler was elected for a second term in the 2022 Maine election as the Democratic Party candidate with 3,600 votes, against the Republican Party candidate Tammy B. Walter, who received 1,195 votes for Representative to the Legislature, House District 121, which includes South Portland and Cape Elizabeth.
