= Melanie Sachs =

American politician and social worker

Member of the Maine House of Representatives from the 48th district
- Incumbent
- Assumed office December 2, 2020
- Preceded by: Sara Gideon

Personal details
- Born: Morristown, New Jersey, U.S.
- Party: Democratic
- Education: Bates College (BA); Case Western Reserve University (MS)

Melanie F. Sachs is an American politician and social worker serving as a member of the Maine House of Representatives from the 48th district. She assumed office on December 2, 2020.

== Early life and education ==
Sachs was born in Morristown, New Jersey and raised in New Sharon, Maine. After graduating from Mt. Blue High School, she earned a Bachelor of Arts degree in political science from Bates College and a Master of Science degree in science and social administration from Case Western Reserve University.

== Career ==
Prior to her career in politics, Sachs was a social worker in Maine. She has worked as the executive director of Freeport Community Services and Sexual Assault Response Services of Southern Maine. She was also a member of the Freeport Town Council. Sachs was elected to the Maine House of Representatives in 2020. She assumed office on December 2, 2020, succeeding former speaker Sara Gideon.
