= Ann Matlack =

American politician

Member of the Maine House of Representatives from the 43rd district
- In office December 5, 2018 – December 2020
- Preceded by: John Spear

Member of the Maine House of Representatives from the 92nd district
- In office December 2020 – December 2026

Personal details
- Born: Portsmouth, Virginia
- Party: Democratic
- Education: Bachelor of Science
- Alma mater: University of Maine

Ann Higgins Matlack is an American politician who has served as a member of the Maine House of Representatives since December 2018. She has also worked as assistant to the city manager of Rockland, Maine.

== Electoral history ==
Matlack was first elected to the 92nd district in the 2018 Maine House of Representatives election. She was reelected in the 2020 Maine House of Representatives election. She was redisreicted to the 43rd district and elected in the 2022 Maine House of Representatives election.

== Biography ==
Matlack graduated from Kempsville High School in 1973. She earned a Bachelor of Science in education from the University of Maine in 1977.
