= Matt Moonen =

American politician

Majority Leader of the Maine House of Representatives
- Incumbent
- Assumed office December 3, 2024
- Preceded by: Maureen Terry
- In office December 5, 2018 – December 2, 2020
- Preceded by: Erin Herbig
- Succeeded by: Michelle Dunphy

Member of the Maine House of Representatives from the 117th district
- Incumbent
- Assumed office December 7, 2022
- Preceded by: Barbara Wood

Member of the Maine House of Representatives from the 38th district
- In office December 3, 2014 – December 2, 2020
- Preceded by: Louis Luchini
- Succeeded by: Barbara Wood

Member of the Maine House of Representatives from the 118th district
- In office December 5, 2012 – December 3, 2014
- Preceded by: Jane Giles; Jon Hinck
- Succeeded by: Larry Dunphy

Personal details
- Born: May 9, 1984 (age 42)
- Party: Democratic
- Education: Northwestern University (BA)

Matt Moonen (born May 9, 1984) is an American politician from Maine. A Democrat from Portland, he was first elected to the Maine House of Representatives in 2012. Moonen, who could not run for reelection to the House in 2020 due to term limits, was a candidate for Maine Secretary of State before losing to Shenna Bellows. He returned to the House of Representatives in the 2022 election, winning in the 117tth district, and was re-elected unopposed in 2024.

Moonen, who is openly gay, was the executive director of EqualityMaine. He is married to Jeremy Kennedy, Chief of Staff to Maine Governor Janet Mills.

Maine House of Representatives
Preceded by Erin Herbig	Majority Leader of the Maine House of Representatives; 2018–2020	Succeeded by Michelle Dunphy
Preceded by Maureen Terry	Majority Leader of the Maine House of Representatives; 2024–present	Incumbent
