= History and use of ranked voting =

Ranked voting is any voting system that uses voters' rankings of candidates to choose a single winner or multiple winners. In contrast to the more common plurality voting that takes into account only the first choice, ranked voting takes into account the voters' entire order of preference of the candidates. The most common examples of ranked voting systems are instant-runoff voting and the single transferrable vote.

== Early proposals ==
The earliest known proposals for a ranked voting system can be traced to the works of Ramon Llull in the late 13th century, who developed what would later be known as Copeland's method. Llull presented the idea in his 1299 treatise Ars Electionis, which was discussed by Nicholas of Cusa in the fifteenth century.

A second wave of analysis began when Jean-Charles de Borda published a paper in 1781, advocating the Borda count, which he called the "order of merit". This methodology drew criticism from the Marquis de Condorcet, who pointed out the Borda method did not always reflect group preferences because it was vulnerable to spoiler effects and did not always elect the majority-preferred candidate. Condorcet developed his own election method, which was similar to the earlier Copeland's method.

In the 1700s, Condorcet pointed out the weakness of systems that eliminate a candidate out of hand after the first round, such as the two-round system or instant-runoff voting (IRV). He rejected them as having the weakness that they might eliminate a candidate who is the actual preference of most voters. In 1864, Edward J. Nanson, while noting Condorcet's concerns, said the IRV method is "a perfectly feasible and practicable one for elections on any scale".

== 19th century ==
Interest in ranked voting continued throughout the 19th century. The concept of ranked voting as merely a series of alternate preferences, as opposed to weighted rankings, was formulated by Carl Andræ in his version of the single transferable vote election system. This system was adopted and put into use in his country, Denmark, in 1855. This used contingent ranked votes to transfer votes of elected candidates, but it did not include transfers of votes from eliminated candidates. The STV variant was abandoned in favour of open list proportional representation (open list PR). STV still carried on in Denmark until 1953 for indirect election of the upper house.

At approximately the same time, the STV system was independently devised by British lawyer Thomas Hare. Like Andræ, he suggested using rankings as contingent preferences to be used only if needed. His writings soon spread the method throughout the British Empire. Tasmania used STV (called the Hare system) in government elections in the 1890s.

Massachusetts Institute of Technology (MIT) professor W. R. Ware held a demonstration single transferable vote election in 1871 by having 150 MIT students elect four English authors as their favorites. The field of candidates held the names of 35 authors in the first count and eventually concentrated a large proportion of the votes behind just four. Ware went on to surmise how a casual vacancy might be handled and found that countback would produce a winner. This proved that contingent ranked transferable votes (instant-runoff voting) could be used to produce a single winner, despite the qualms of Condorcet and others.

== 20th century ==
In the first half of the 20th century, single transferable voting (multi-seat contests using contingent ranked transferable votes) found common use in cities and was used to elect legislators in North America, Ireland and other parts of the English-speaking world, with single-winner versions, alternative voting (now known as instant-runoff voting) and the contingent vote system (or its variant known as supplementary voting) being its companions for single-winner contests of mayors and others.

Theoretical exploration of electoral processes was revived by a 1948 paper from Duncan Black and Kenneth Arrow's investigations into social choice theory, a branch of welfare economics that extends rational choice to include community decision-making processes.

STV began permanent and wider adoption throughout Australia beginning in 1907 and throughout the 1910s. The STV system, using contingent ranked votes, has been adopted in Ireland, South Africa, Malta, and approximately 40 cities in the United States and Canada. The single transferable vote system has also been used to elect legislators in Canada, South Africa, India and Nepal.

== Resurgence of ranked voting in the 2020s ==
In the early 2020s, the use of contingent ranked votes saw a comeback in the United States. STV, for a time used only in Cambridge, Massachusetts, was adopted by Portland, Oregon, and several other American cities beginning in 2022.

Single-winner ranked voting (specifically instant-runoff voting) is used to elect politicians in the states of Maine and Alaska. In November 2016, the voters of Maine narrowly passed Question 5, approving instant-runoff voting for all elections. This was first put to use in 2018, marking the inaugural use of ranked votes in a statewide election in the United States. (Maine's statewide vote tally was used to determine the two state-wide electoral college seats.)

In November 2020, Alaska voters passed Measure 2, bringing instant-runoff voting into use from 2022. After a series of electoral pathologies in Alaska's 2022 congressional special election, a poll found 54% of Alaskans supported a repeal of the system. This included a third of the voters who had supported Mary Peltola, the ultimate winner in the election. However, a referendum on the issue in 2024 saw a narrow majority in favour of retention of IRV.

Some local elections in New Zealand use the multi-winner single transferable vote system. STV is also used to elect local authorities in Scotland and Ireland.

Nauru uses a rank-weighted positional method called the Dowdall system.

== Practical aspects ==
Ranked ballots raise practical questions that do not arise under plurality voting: how voters mark a preference order, how many candidates they must rank, what happens to ballots that stop before the last candidate, how to keep a long ballot manageable, how to protect the secrecy of a vote whose full preference order may be unique, and how to count ballots whose later preferences matter only after other candidates have been eliminated. Jurisdictions that use ranked voting have answered these questions in different ways.

=== Ballot design and marking ===
Two ballot formats are in common use. In Australia and Ireland, the ballot paper lists the candidates with a box beside each name, and the voter writes numbers in the boxes: "1" for the first preference, "2" for the second, and so on. In Ireland, candidates are listed alphabetically, the ballot paper carries each candidate's photograph and party emblem, pencils are supplied at the polling station, and any other mark on the paper may make the vote invalid.

Jurisdictions in the United States, which count ballots with optical scanners, instead use a grid: candidates' names run down the left-hand column, the ranks run across the top row, and the voter fills in ovals to record each ranking. Alaska's ballot instructions tell voters to fill in only one oval per candidate in each column. In San Francisco, voters may also use a ballot-marking device that prints a ballot, which is then scanned at the polling place.

In the Australian Capital Territory, voters at electronic polling places may instead vote on a computer, touching the box beside each candidate's name in their order of preference. Each such voter is given a card whose QR code identifies only the electorate and polling place, not the voter; the code is scanned to start and to submit the vote.

Long ballots also magnify the ballot-position effect: voters who number candidates straight down a column favour whoever is printed at the top. Since 1979, Tasmania has printed as many versions of the ballot paper as there are candidates in a column, so that each candidate appears in each position equally often, a method known as Robson rotation. The Australian Capital Territory also uses Robson rotation and, after its 1998 election, increased the number of versions to 60 for five-candidate columns and 420 for seven-candidate columns.

=== Full and partial rankings ===
Jurisdictions differ on how many candidates a voter must rank.

Full ranking
For the Australian House of Representatives, voters must number every box consecutively; a ballot paper that does not give an order for all candidates is informal and is set aside without being counted. A savings provision keeps a ballot formal when only one box is left blank, in which case the blank box is treated as the last preference; two or more blank boxes make the vote informal. Ticks and crosses are not accepted as a first preference on House ballot papers. Section 329A of the Commonwealth Electoral Act made it an offence to publish material encouraging voters to fill in a House ballot other than by full preferential voting. Albert Langer had urged voters to repeat a number beside several candidates (for example 1, 2, 3, 3, 3), which the savings provisions kept formal while recording no preference among the candidates sharing the repeated number. In February 1996, the Australian Electoral Commission obtained an injunction against him under section 329A, and he was jailed for contempt of that order on 14 February 1996 before being released early on appeal on 7 March.
Minimum number of rankings
Since 2016, voters for the Australian Senate are instructed to number at least six boxes above the line (for parties) or at least twelve below the line (for individual candidates). Savings provisions nevertheless count an above-the-line ballot marked with only a "1", and a below-the-line ballot with at least six consecutive preferences. A single tick or cross may stand in for the "1" on Senate ballots. A Senate ballot with a missing or repeated number remains formal if it meets these minimums, but stops counting at the gap or repetition.
Optional ranking
In Ireland voters may rank as many or as few candidates as they wish, provided they start with "1". In elections for the New South Wales Legislative Assembly, a ballot showing only a "1" is formal and further preferences are optional. Ranked-choice jurisdictions in the United States likewise accept a ballot marking only a first choice, as in Maine and in Portland, Oregon.
Unranked candidates and exhausted ballots
When rankings are optional, a ballot that ranks none of the candidates still in the count is "exhausted" and is not counted for any continuing candidate. Maine law also treats a ballot as exhausted when it reaches an overvote (more than one candidate given the same rank) or two or more consecutive skipped rankings before its highest continuing ranking. Rules for such errors vary: in Portland, when a voter gives several candidates the same rank, the tabulating machines discard that rank and move to the voter's next one. At the 2016 Australian Senate election, the first under the minimum-ranking rules, about 3.2% of above-the-line voters marked only a "1" and most of the rest marked exactly six boxes; the AEC estimated that 7.5% of ballots exhausted nationally.

=== Group voting tickets ===
Ranking every candidate becomes harder as the number of candidates grows. By 1983 the informal vote in Australian Senate elections, which then required every candidate to be numbered, had reached 9.9%, mostly because of numbering errors. From 1984 voters could instead place a single mark above the line, adopting a group voting ticket lodged by the party; 96.49% of Senate votes were cast above the line in 2013. Critics of the system pointed to senators elected on very small primary votes, such as Ricky Muir of the Australian Motoring Enthusiast Party, who was elected in Victoria in 2013 with 0.51% of first preferences. The main objection, however, concerned where the later preferences came from: on an above-the-line vote, they were set by the party, not by the voter, and a voter had no practical way of knowing which of a group's tickets their vote would follow. Micro-parties exchanged ticket preferences with one another, a practice known as "preference harvesting", and the Joint Standing Committee on Electoral Matters concluded that some parties were using the tickets to direct preferences in ways that did not match voters' expectations.

A small first-preference vote is not in itself a defect of ranked voting: a candidate whom few voters rank first but many rank second can be a legitimate compromise. The following hypothetical single-seat example shows how group voting tickets differ from that case. Of 100 voters, 35 support a conservative candidate C, 31 a labour candidate L, and 34 are spread over five micro-parties (M1 with 6 votes and M2–M5 with 7 each). Suppose that the micro-party voters know little about the other micro-parties and that 24 of them would rank L second.

- If voters ranked candidates themselves, the micro-parties would be eliminated and L would win by 55 votes to 45.
- If instead every micro-party ticket places M5 directly after its own candidate, the micro-parties' votes accumulate on M5 as they are eliminated (starting at M1), leaving C with 35, M5 with 34 and L with 31; L is then eliminated, and if L's ticket ranks the micro-parties above C, M5 wins with 65 votes.

M5 is ranked second by 27 voters only because their parties' tickets put it there. Had those voters ranked M5 second themselves, its election would reflect a genuine compromise; here it reflects an agreement between parties that the voters never saw. According to the true preferences, L is the Condorcet winner (it wins over C 65:35, and wins over ever micro-party at least 58:42); the distortion is caused by the fact that voters do not read the full lists, and thus their vote does not reflect their true preferences.

For this reason, group voting tickets were abolished in Australia in 2016. In that year, the New South Wales Senate ballot listed 151 candidates in 41 groups, and the new twelve-preference minimum below the line relieved voters of having to number all 151 boxes.

=== Ranking caps ===
Several American jurisdictions cap the number of rankings. San Francisco allowed voters to rank three candidates when it introduced ranked-choice voting in 2004 and now allows up to ten; New York City allowed five rankings in its 2021 primaries; and Portland allows six. Papua New Guinea limits voters to three rankings.

=== How-To-Vote cards ===
In Australian Commonwealth and state elections, voters are handed How-To-Vote cards (HTVC) which recommend how best to support a chosen candidate. In South Australia, the Electoral Commission publishes a combined HTVC for all candidates which saves time and money. This also benefits minor parties and independents who are unable to staff all polling booths.

=== Ballot secrecy and identifiable preference orders ===
The number of possible preference orders grows factorially with the number of candidates, so a full ranking may be unique to a single voter. In a so-called signature or "Italian" attack, a coercer instructs a voter to rank a chosen candidate first followed by a specified sequence of candidates with little support, and later looks for that sequence among the counted ballots; the large fields of candidates in Australian elections make them particularly exposed. Williams, Baltz and Stewart showed that a vote buyer could assign each bought voter a distinct, otherwise unused ranking and check for it in published results. The risk is negligible with four or fewer candidates and grows rapidly with ballot length; in a simulation based on San Francisco's 2019 mayoral election, more than 95% of randomly assigned rankings matched no genuine ballot and would therefore have been identifiable. The authors found no evidence that the scheme had actually been used.

The exposure depends largely on how much ballot-level data is published. Maine law requires the Secretary of State to post the complete cast vote record on a public website, and San Francisco reports full rankings at precinct level. The Australian Electoral Commission publishes a file of formal Senate preferences for each state, and Elections ACT publishes the preferences on every formal ballot paper counted. Proposed mitigations include capping the number of rankings, aggregating or withholding data for small precincts, not reporting which ranks a voter skipped, and statistical checks for many unique sequences that share a first choice. Wichmann, analysing full preference data from Ireland's 2002 electronic voting trial, proposed publishing only those preferences actually used in the count. Under Irish law, the returning officer mixes together the ballot papers from all ballot boxes before the votes are counted.

=== Counting and tabulation ===
Each round of an instant-runoff count depends on the outcome of the previous round, so results cannot be finalised simply by adding up precinct totals. In Maine, if no candidate wins a majority of first choices on election night, the ballots and memory devices from each municipality are transported to a central tabulation site in Augusta. Centralised tabulation concentrates the effect of errors: in the 2021 New York City Democratic mayoral primary, the Board of Elections failed to remove 135,000 test ballot records from its system and withdrew its first preliminary ranked-choice results hours after releasing them.

Hand counting of single transferable vote elections is slow and can introduce arbitrary elements. Under Irish rules, when a surplus is smaller than the parcel of papers being transferred, the papers transferred are effectively chosen at random, and their later preferences can change the result; Coakley and O'Neill argued that computerised counting could remove this element of chance. In Malta, where a manual STV count could take three to four days, the Electoral Commission contracted in 2017 for ballot-scanning and electronic counting, first used at the 2019 European Parliament and local council elections.

Electronic voting and counting bring their own risks. After the 2020 ACT election, Teague and Conway found that the territory's counting software rounded transfer values to the nearest sixth decimal place instead of down, as the law requires, and mis-grouped some transferred votes; the errors did not change which candidates were elected. Ireland piloted electronic voting machines at the 2002 general election but never rolled them out nationally because of security concerns, and the machines were scrapped in 2012 at a total cost of more than €54 million. In New South Wales, an outage of the iVote online voting system during the 2021 local elections led the Supreme Court in March 2022 to void the elections in Kempsey, Singleton and Shellharbour Ward A, and the Electoral Commission did not use iVote at the 2023 state election.

== See also ==
- History and use of instant-runoff voting
- History and use of the single transferable vote
- List of electoral systems by country
