= Electoral systems of the Australian states and territories =

Electoral systems of the Australian states and territories are broadly similar to the electoral system used in federal elections in Australia.

When the Australian colonies were granted responsible government in the 19th century, the constitutions of each colony introduced bicameral parliaments, each of which was based on the contemporaneous version of the Westminster system. In these parliaments, a lower house (often known as the legislative assembly) was composed of multiple single-member, geographical constituencies. Suffrage was extended only to adult males, with some states including a property criterion. In Queensland and Western Australia the vote was specifically denied to people of indigenous Australian descent. Despite these forms of discrimination, the electorates of Australian lower houses were, paradoxically, socially broader than those existing in most other countries at the time. However, in each colony an upper house (usually known as the legislative council) continued to be composed of members that were nominated by the governor of each colony and/or were elected under a restricted franchise that usually included a property qualification. This ensured that each upper house continued to be unrepresentative and dominated by wealthy landholders.

Before or soon after Federation in 1901, women of European descent received voting rights, at different times in each colony/state. While the abolition of the upper houses was often proposed, the only instance in which this occurred was Queensland, which became unicameral in 1922 (when the Legislative Council of Queensland was abolished). Gradually the various upper houses became directly-elected and property qualifications were removed. Indigenous Australians received the right to vote at different times in different states. In 1964, Western Australia removed restrictions on the voting rights of indigenous people and abolished the property qualification for the Legislative Council of Western Australia. The following year Queensland became the last state to lift restrictions on people voting, based on indigenous descent.

The Northern Territory and Australian Capital Territory were directly administered by the federal government until 1974 and 1989 respectively. Both now have, like Queensland, unicameral parliaments.

== Conduct of elections ==
State and local government elections, by-elections and referendums are overseen by Electoral Commissions in each state and territory, as follows:

- New South Wales – New South Wales Electoral Commission
- Queensland – Electoral Commission of Queensland
- Victoria – Victorian Electoral Commission
- South Australia – Electoral Commission of South Australia
- Tasmania – Tasmanian Electoral Commission
- Western Australia – Western Australian Electoral Commission
- Northern Territory – Northern Territory Electoral Commission, and
- Australian Capital Territory – Australian Capital Territory Electoral Commission

== Date of elections ==
By federal law, state elections cannot take place on the same day as a federal election, which takes precedence if there is a conflict of dates. Federal elections have been held on a Saturday since the 1913 federal election.

All state and territory lower houses have four-year terms, and all mainland states and territories terms are fixed and determined by statute.

In New South Wales, elections are held on the last Saturday in March every 4th year, with the last election being on 25 March 2023, and the next election due on 27 March 2027. In Victoria, elections are held on the last Saturday in November every 4th year. The last election was on 26 November 2022, and the next election will be held on 28 November 2026. Prior to the 2006 Victorian election, Victorian parliamentary elections could be held any time at the discretion of the government in the last year of their four-year term of office. This meant that, in practice, the average period between elections was somewhat less than the maximum four years.

Queensland holds elections every 4th year on the last Saturday in October with the most recent election held on 26 October 2024. In Western Australia, elections are held every 4th year on the second Saturday in March with the most recent election held on 8 March 2025.

In South Australia, section 28 of the Constitution Act 1934, as amended in 2001, directs elections must be held on the third Saturday in March every four years unless this date falls the day after Good Friday, occurs within the same month as a Commonwealth election, or the conduct of the election could be adversely affected by a state disaster. The timing of the Tasmanian lower house election is determined by the premier of Tasmania.

== Electoral systems used ==
Of Australia's six states and two territories, two use Single transferable vote (STV) for election of members of their lower house. The rest use alternative voting (Instant-runoff voting (IRV)). Below is a breakdown of each state and territory's electoral systems;

== Australian Capital Territory ==
In the Australian Capital Territory, the Legislative Assembly originally had 17 members from three electorates; at the 2016 election this was increased to 25 members from five electorates. Members are elected for four-year terms, each electing five members under a form of STV proportional representation system, known as the Hare-Clark system. The system was introduced at the 1995 election.

Casual vacancies are filled by the 'countback' method, which involves recounting the original ballot papers to elect one of the candidates who stood but failed to be elected in the last election.

=== Nomination ===
Nomination as a candidate requires the following:

- an Australian citizen, and
- 18 years old, and
- qualified to be an elector in the ACT (that is, you have lived in the ACT for at least one month).

== New South Wales ==
Elections in New South Wales are conducted by the New South Wales Electoral Commission as prescribed in the Constitution Act, 1902 (NSW).

=== Legislative Assembly ===
The New South Wales Legislative Assembly has 93 members elected for four-year terms in single-member electoral districts. The method of election is optional preferential voting, (also known as IRV). The voting system is the same as for the federal House of Representatives except that in New South Wales the voter may choose how many candidate preferences to allocate beyond their primary vote. This means that while voters may number every candidate if they wish, their vote is still formal if they choose not to. They may vote for one candidate only, or for as many candidates as they choose, provided that they number them starting at 1, and increasing sequentially.

The NSW Electoral Commission determines electoral boundaries using a distribution process which provides for an approximate equal number of electors in each electoral district; with a margin of allowance of plus or minus 10% of the average enrolment.

=== Legislative Council ===
The New South Wales Legislative Council has 42 members elected for eight-year terms, one-half of the body being elected every four years, using the single transferable vote method, a form of preferential voting for use with proportional representation. The NSW constitution requires voters to express preferences for at least 15 candidates on the ballot – either through numbering individual candidates or at least one "above the line" vote – however preferences after this point are optional.

Since its formation in 1855, the Council has had three different methods of election (or appointment).

1. From 1855 to 1933 its members were appointed by the Governor, and the Council had no fixed size. In the early part of this period the Governor exercised a personal discretion in appointing members, but once the convention became established that the Governor acted only on the advice of the Premier, this meant that the Council was in effect appointed by the Premier.
2. By the 1920s this was felt to be undemocratic and undesirable, so in 1933 the method of choosing members of the Council was changed by referendum. From 1933 to 1978, the Council consisted of 60 members, chosen for 12-year terms by single transferable vote in a secret ballot of both Houses of the Parliament (all Members of the Legislative Assembly and the 45 non-retiring Members of the Legislative Council). One-quarter of the members of the Council (15 of 60) came up for re-election every three years. This meant in practice that the party composition of the Council reflected that of the Assembly, with a lag of some years.
3. In 1978 Neville Wran's Labor government reformed the Council, again by referendum. Since that time the Council has been elected by the people by STV proportional representation, with the whole state voting as one electorate.
4. In 1978 the size of the Council was reduced to 45 members, serving nine-year terms, with one third of the members coming up for election every three years. When the term of the Legislative Assembly was extended from three years to four in 1984, terms of the Council were consequently extended to twelve years. At another referendum in 1991, the membership of the Council was reduced again to its current size, and the current system of eight-year terms, with elections every four years, was introduced, 21 (half the council) are elected at each election. (Whole-vote method transferring only surplus votes are used in cases where candidate is elected with surplus votes.)
5. The existence of the Legislative Council, its powers, and fixed four-year terms for both houses are all entrenched in the NSW Constitution Act, and none can be changed except by referendum.

Council elections use "above the line" ballot papers, but a vote above the line equates to voting for candidates in one group – there are no group voting tickets as there are in Victoria.

=== Nomination ===
Nomination as a candidate requires the following:

- the candidate must be over 18 years of age, and must be enrolled to vote in New South Wales, although not necessarily be a resident of the electorate for which they are nominating,
- a nomination form signed by the candidate and either by 15 electors enrolled in the electoral district to be contested or the Registered Officer of a political party, and
- to pay a deposit of $250 (Legislative Assembly) or $500 (Legislative Council), which is returned if the candidate gains at least 4% of the first preference vote.

== Northern Territory ==
=== Legislative Assembly ===
The Northern Territory Legislative Assembly has 25 members elected for four-year terms from single-member constituencies under the same preferential form of the Alternative Vote used for the House of Representatives. The voting method changed in February 2016 from full-preferential voting to optional preferential voting. The Territory has never had an upper house.

=== Nomination ===
Nomination as a candidate requires the following:

- an Australian citizen
- a resident within the Commonwealth for at least 6 months and within the Territory for at least 3 months.
- the candidate must be over 18 years of age,
- a nomination form signed by the candidate and either by 6 electors or the Registered Officer of a political party (registration of a party requires 200 members), and
- to pay a deposit of $200, which is returned if the candidate gains at least 20% of first preference vote.

== Queensland ==
Elections in Queensland are conducted by the Electoral Commission of Queensland.

=== Legislative Assembly ===
The Legislative Assembly of Queensland has 93 members elected for fixed four-year terms from single-member constituencies using full-preferential voting. The Queensland Legislative Council, which consisted of members nominated by the Governor, was abolished by a Labor government in 1922.

Queensland has used the alternative vote since 1962. It used the 'first past the post' (plurality) system from 1860 to 1892. From then until 1942 an unusual form of preferential voting called the contingent vote was used. In 1942 the plurality system was reintroduced until it was replaced in 1962 by the 'full preferential' form of the alternative vote. From 1992 until 2016 the optional preferential system was used.

=== Nomination ===
Nomination as a candidate requires the following:

- the candidate must be over 18 years of age,
- a nomination form signed by the candidate and either by 6 electors or the Registered Officer of a political party (registration of a party requires 500 members), and
- to pay a deposit of $250, which is returned if the candidate gains at least 4% of first preference vote.

== South Australia ==
Elections in South Australia are conducted by the Electoral Commission of South Australia. The Electoral Act stipulates that the election campaign must run for a minimum of 25 days and a maximum of 55 days. Like all other states and territories voting in South Australia is compulsory, however unlike other states initial enrolment is not compulsory so a voter could theoretically not be compelled to vote if they chose never to enrol.

=== House of Assembly ===
The South Australian House of Assembly has 47 members elected under the preferential Instant-runoff voting (IRV) system. If on the count of primary or first preference votes (votes marked with the number '1'), no candidate achieves more than 50% of the vote, the candidate with the fewest votes is excluded and their votes distributed according to the next available preferences, their 2nd or 3rd choice candidate. This process of exclusion continues until one candidate achieves 50% of the vote.

Group voting tickets were abolished for both houses of the South Australian parliament in 2018.

=== Legislative Council ===
The South Australian Legislative Council has 22 members elected under the preferential single transferable voting system. Following the similar Senate changes which took effect from the 2016 federal election, as of the 2018 state election, South Australia's single transferable vote in the proportionally represented upper house was changed from group voting tickets to optional preferential voting − instructions for above the line votes are to mark '1' and then further preferences are optional as opposed to preference flows from simply '1' above the line being determined by group voting tickets, while instructions for voters who instead opt to vote below the line are to provide at least 12 preferences as opposed to having to number all candidates, and with a savings provision to admit ballot papers which indicate at least 6 below the line preferences.

The South Australian Electoral Districts Boundaries Commission is responsible for a mandatory redistribution of House of Assembly boundaries before each election to ensure one vote one value.

Turnout rates are above 90%. Informal voting, which occurs when a voting slip is not valid, is at a rate of under 5%. Voting slips are informal when they are not filled out correctly, such examples are not numbering subsequent numbers, not filling out all the candidate boxes with numbers (except the last candidate), or in some other way that is verified by the State Electoral Office as illegible. South Australian elections have some features that are unique to the rest of Australia.

=== Nomination ===
Nomination as a candidate requires the following:

- the candidate must be over 18 years of age,
- a nomination form signed by the candidate and either by 2 electors or the Registered Officer of a political party (registration of a party requires 150 members), and
- to pay a deposit of a "prescribed amount".

== Tasmania ==
Elections in Tasmania are conducted by the Tasmanian Electoral Commission.

=== House of Assembly ===
The Tasmanian House of Assembly (the lower house) has 35 members, elected for four-year terms from five multi-member constituencies, each electing seven members by STV proportional representation. Tasmania is the only State to use proportional representation to elect its lower house, although it is also used in the Australian Capital Territory. Tasmania uses a form of STV known as the Hare-Clark system, which was introduced in 1909. Casual vacancies are filled by the 'countback' method, which involves recounting the original ballot papers to elect one of the candidates who stood but failed to be elected in the last election.

=== Legislative Council ===
The Tasmanian Legislative Council (the upper house) has 15 members, each representing one of 15 electoral divisions. Elections are conducted on a 6-year periodic cycle. Elections for 3 members are held in May one year, with elections for 2 members held in May the following year and so on. Legislative Council elections use the same full preferential voting system used for the federal House of Representatives. Elections are held on the first Saturday in May each year.

Until recently Tasmania required voters to be residents of the State for at least six months before they were eligible to enrol and vote. This is no longer the case, bringing Tasmania into line with other states and the federal position.

=== Nomination ===
Nomination as a candidate requires the following:

- the candidate must be over 18 years of age, and must be enrolled to vote in Tasmania, although not necessarily be a resident of the electorate for which they are nominating,
- a nomination form signed by the candidate and either by 10 electors or the Registered Officer of a political party, and
- to pay a deposit of $400, which is returned if the candidate gains at least 20% of a quota at time of exclusion.

== Victoria ==
Elections in Victoria are conducted by the Victorian Electoral Commission.

=== Legislative Assembly ===
The Victorian Legislative Assembly (lower house) has 88 members elected from single-member electorates (districts) under a preferential voting system, the same system used for the federal House of Representatives. Eleven districts are created in each Legislative Council region. Casual vacancies are filled by by-elections.

=== Legislative Council ===
The Victorian Legislative Council (upper house) has 40 members, with 5 members elected from each of the 8 regions. Five regions are urban (Eastern Metropolitan Region, Northern Metropolitan Region, South Eastern Metropolitan Region, Southern Metropolitan Region, and Western Metropolitan Region) and three are non-urban (Eastern Victoria Region, Northern Victoria Region and Western Victoria Region). A proportional voting system is used, with each member requiring a quota of the vote to be elected. Casual vacancies are filled by an appointment.

In 2003, the Bracks government changed the method of electing members of the Legislative Council. Before 2006, the Council had 44 members from 22 constituencies known as provinces, each elected for two terms at alternating elections.

Group voting tickets have been used since 1988. They were abolished in 2026, replaced with a Senate style system with preferences above or below the line.

Putting a 1 above the line for party A and party B is equivalent to following party A’s how to vote below the line, then following party B’s how to vote, and so on.

=== Nomination ===
Nomination as a candidate requires the following:

- the candidate must be over 18 years of age, and must be enrolled to vote in Victoria, although not necessarily be a resident of the electorate for which they are nominating,
- a nomination form signed by the candidate and either by six electors or the Registered Officer of a political party, and
- payment of a deposit of $350 (Assembly) or $700 (Council), which is returned if the candidate gains at least 4% of the first preference vote.

== Western Australia ==
=== Legislative Assembly ===
The Western Australian Legislative Assembly has 59 members elected for four-year terms from single-member constituencies under the alternative vote form of preferential voting. The voting system is the full preferential system used for the House of Representatives.

=== Legislative Council ===
From 1986 to 2009, the Western Australian Legislative Council had 34 members elected for four-year terms from six multi-member constituencies known as regions, by STV proportional representation. Four regions elected five members while two regions elect seven members. As in the Assembly, the regions are deliberately malapportioned in favour of country areas. Subsequently, since the Legislative Council, elected on 6 September 2008 and commencing office on 22 May 2009, each region was represented by six members, making a total Council of 36.

A recount method is used to fill mid-term vacancies in the Legislative Council. All ballots from the original election are recounted, with preferences for the vacating member ignored. If a candidate not participating in the recount would be elected, the count is restarted and their preferences are also ignored, until a participating candidate is elected. This is slightly different from the "Countback" method used to fill vacancies in the Tasmanian House of Assembly. However, like the Tasmanian system, legislation provides for the ability to call a by-election if the party the vacating member stood for at the original election does not have any qualifying candidates – for instance, if all of their candidates at the original election were elected.

Group voting tickets were introduced in 1987 and abolished in 2021.

=== Nomination ===
Nomination as a candidate requires the following:

- the candidate must have resided in Western Australia for at least one year.
- the candidate must be an Australian citizen.
- the candidate must be over 18 years of age,
- a nomination form signed by the candidate or the Registered Officer of a political party (registration of a party requires 500 members), and
- to pay a deposit of $250, which is returned if the candidate gains at least 5% of the first preference vote, or if a group gains 10% of the first preference votes.

== Summary ==
=== Lower houses ===
Body elected	Unicameral	Seats	System	Term	Voting tickets	Preferences
ACT Legislative Assembly	Yes	25	STV	4 years	No	Optional
New South Wales Legislative Assembly	No	93	AV	4 years	No	Optional
Northern Territory Legislative Assembly	Yes	25	AV	4 years	No	Full
Legislative Assembly of Queensland	Yes	93	AV	4 years	No	Full
South Australian House of Assembly	No	47	AV	4 years	No	Full
Tasmanian House of Assembly	No	35	STV	4 years	No	Optional
Victorian Legislative Assembly	No	88	AV	4 years	No	Full
Western Australian Legislative Assembly	No	59	AV	4 years	No	Full

=== Upper houses ===
Body elected	System	Term	Frequency	Seats	Seats per district (Number of districts)	Group Voting Tickets/Party List	Max GVTs	Preferences	Vacancies	Surplus method
New South Wales Legislative Council	STV	8 years	4 years	42	21 (1)	Party List	n/a	Optional	Appointment	Random
South Australian Legislative Council	STV	8 years	4 years	22	11 (1)	Party List	n/a	Optional	Appointment	Gregory (inclusive)
Tasmanian Legislative Council	AV	6 years	Annual	15	1 (15)	n/a	n/a	Full	By-election	n/a
Victorian Legislative Council	STV	4 years	4 years	40	5 (8)	GVT	3	Optional	Appointment	Gregory (inclusive)
Western Australian Legislative Council	STV	4 years	4 years	37	37 (1)	Party List	n/a	Optional	Recount	Gregory (weighted inclusive)

Note (1) : Queensland and the two territories are unicameral, and do not have an upper house. Note (2) : Under inclusive Gregory method, transfer value equals (surplus / total papers received by the elected candidate). Under weighted inclusive Gregory method, transfer value equals [current transfer value x (surplus / total votes received by the elected candidate)].

== See also ==
- Parliaments of the Australian states and territories
- Proportional Representation Society of Australia
- History and use of the Alternative Vote
- History and use of the Single Transferable Vote
- Suffrage in Australia
