= History and use of instant-runoff voting =

Instant-runoff voting (IRV) is a ranked voting method used in single-winner elections. IRV is also known outside the US as the alternative vote (AV) or preferential voting. IRV is known by different names in the various countries in which it is used. It is also known as the 'Alternative Vote', 'Ranked Choice Voting', and 'Preferential Voting', although IRV is only one of many ranked (or preferential) voting systems.

Today it is in use at the national level to elect the Australian House of Representatives, the National Parliament of Papua New Guinea, the President of Ireland and President of India. In Australia it is also used for elections to the legislative assemblies (lower houses) of all states and territories except Tasmania and the Australian Capital Territory, and for the Tasmanian Legislative Council (upper house).

IRV is also used in some municipal elections in Australia, the United States, United Kingdom and New Zealand. Because of its relationship to the Single Transferable Vote (STV) system, IRV is used for by-elections and elections with only a single winner (such as elections for the President of Ireland) in some jurisdictions that use STV for ordinary parliamentary elections, such as the Republic of Ireland and Scotland.

Instant-runoff voting is based on the Single Transferable Vote electoral system, developed by Hill in 1819, Hare in 1857, and Andrae in 1855. Unlike IRV, the Single Transferable Vote was designed as a form of proportional representation involving multi-seat constituencies, while IRV is a majoritarian method, where minority sentiment goes un-represented.

It is also known as Ware's method, after William Robert Ware, the founder of the schools of architecture at the Massachusetts Institute of Technology (MIT) and Columbia University, who, while describing the experience of holding a demonstration single transferable vote election in 1871, mentioned that a similar method could be used for single-winner elections.

IRV was adopted for the Australian House of Representatives in 1918 and has been used to elect the President of Ireland since the office came into being in 1937. It was introduced in Fiji in 1999 and in Papua New Guinea in 2007.

IRV in its true form (what was called Alternative Voting at the time) was first used in Australia in 1909.

== History of the use of IRV by country ==
=== Australia ===
The first known use of an IRV-like method in a governmental election was in the 1893 general election in the Colony of Queensland (in present-day Australia). The variant used for this election was a "contingent vote", where all candidates but two are eliminated in the first round, with one of the last two elected by majority after votes of the others are transferred. Queensland used contingent voting until 1942, one of the longest uses of the system anywhere.

IRV in its true form (what was called Alternative Voting at the time) was first used in Western Australia, in the 1908 state election. The lower houses of Australian states (except Tasmania and ACT) and the Australian House of Representatives are elected through IRV. The last state to adopt AV was Queensland in 1962, It had switched from contingent voting to single-member plurality in 1942. Multi-winner STV of the Hare-Clark version was introduced for the Tasmanian House of Assembly at the 1909 state election. The Australian Capital Territory used party-list proportional representation from 1989 until 1995 when it adopted STV.

IRV was introduced for federal (nationwide) elections in Australia after the Swan by-election in October 1918, in response to the rise of the conservative Country Party, representing small farmers. The Country Party split the non-Labor vote in conservative country areas, allowing Labor candidates to win without a majority of the vote. The conservative government of Billy Hughes introduced IRV (in Australia called "preferential voting") as a means of allowing competition between the Coalition parties without putting seats at risk. It was first used at the Corangamite by-election on 14 December 1918, and at a national level at the 1919 election. IRV continued to benefit the Coalition until the 1990 election, when for the first time Labor obtained a net benefit from IRV.

IRV (in Australia called preferential voting) was introduced for House of Representatives elections in Australia after the Swan by-election in October 1918, when the conservative Country Party, representing small farmers, split the non-Labor vote in conservative country areas, allowing Labor candidates to win on a first-past-the-post vote then in place. The conservative Nationalist government of Billy Hughes introduced preferential voting to enable the Coalition parties to field candidates in the same electorates without putting Coalition seats at risk. It was first used at the Corangamite by-election on 14 December 1918, and nationwide at the 1919 election. Preferential voting continued to benefit the Coalition until the 1990 election, when for the first time the Labor Bob Hawke government obtained a net benefit from preferential voting.

Ballot papers are marked with the order of preferences: 1, 2, 3, etc. Counting of the ballot papers proceeds and when no candidate receives more than 50% of the first preference vote (candidates with a number one), the candidate with the fewest first preference votes is eliminated and that candidate's votes are distributed to the remaining candidates. The process continues until a candidate accumulates 50% plus one vote, or a simple majority. Counting will continue to finality, which results in what is referred to as the two-party preferred vote, which expresses the electorate's voting preference equivalent to a 2-person election of the two most popular candidates. Most council (local government) elections also use the method, as do the lower house elections of four states (New South Wales, South Australia, Victoria and Western Australia), the sole house of one state (Queensland) and one territory (the Northern Territory) and the upper house of one other state (Tasmania).

A study of the 2007 federal election found that every House of Representatives electorate had at least four candidates, and the average number of candidates was seven. 76 candidates depended on preferences to win, which represented more than half of the 150 winners.

Preferential voting is used for most state and local elections in Australia, but sometimes with optional preferential voting where voters are allowed to limit their number of rankings. The Australian Senate, the upper houses of four states (New South Wales, South Australia, Victoria and Western Australia), the lower house of one state (Tasmania) and the sole house of the Australian Capital Territory, use the multi-winner single transferable vote system.

In 1955, IRV was used to elect councils in five municipalities in Tasmania - Burnie, Devonport, Kentish, Latrobe and Ulverstone - and in Hobart to elect the mayor.

Combined How-To-Vote-Card

=== Bosnia ===
In 2000, Bosnia used IRV for its election.

=== Canada ===
Under the name 'preferential' or 'elimination ballot' or alternative vote, IRV was used in the British Columbia's general elections of 1952 and 1953. IRV was brought in by the governing coalition consisting of the Liberal and Conservative parties to gain advantage over the rising CCF. But the election did not work out as the coalition partners expected.

Provincially, British Columbia used a mixture of voting methods to elect their members of the Legislative Assembly (MLAs): single-member districts using first-past-the-post and multi-member districts using through block voting. Elections in BC from the province's creation until the 1990 election were held under a mix of multi-member and single-member districts, with district types often being changed back and forth from one election to the next. Through almost all of BC's history, seats were filled by plurality elections. The only exceptions were the 1952 and 1953 elections where Instant-runoff voting was used.

Through the 1940s, the province was governed by a coalition of the British Columbia Conservative Party (the Conservatives) and the British Columbia Liberal Party (the Liberals). Neither party had sufficient electoral support to form government alone, and the coalition allowed these parties to keep the left-of-centre Co-operative Commonwealth Federation (CCF) out of power.

By the 1950s, the coalition had begun to fall apart, resulting in the Conservatives and Liberals having to run for office separately under their own party banners. However, to try to prevent the CCF from being elected, one of the last acts of the coalition government was to introduce the alternative voting system (known today in the US as instant-runoff voting), which was implemented for the 1952 general election. IRV was brought in even in multi-seat districts by the innovation that each seat would be filled by a separate contests, two or even three separate ballots and contests in a district.

In each contest in a district, rather than voting for one candidate by marking an "X" on the ballot, an elector ranked the candidates running in the contest by placing numbers next to their names on the ballot. (They could rank as few or as many candidates as they desired.) The candidate marked with a 1 received the vote in the first count. In the first count, if a candidate received a majority of first preferences marked by voters, that candidate was declared elected with no vote transfers being conducted. If not, the candidate with the fewest votes was dropped and the candidate's ballots were re-allocated to the remaining candidates based on the second choices marked on the ballots. This procedure was repeated again and again if necessary until a candidate received a majority of votes.

The result of using this voting method (plus completely different voting behavior by many BC voters) was the unexpected election of enough MLAs of the British Columbia Social Credit Party (the SoCreds), to form a minority government, with the CCF forming the official opposition. The BC Liberals were reduced to six members in the Legislature. The Conservatives (who changed their party name to the "Progressive Conservatives" in tandem with their federal counterparts) were reduced to four.

The SoCred minority government lasted only nine months before losing a vote in the Legislature and an election having to be called. Alternative voting was again employed in this general election. The result this time was a SoCred majority.

After this second IRV election, the SoCreds abolished the preferential voting system and returned the province to the province's traditional mixed system of block voting in multiple-member constituencies and FPTP contests in single-member districts. The change-back benefited the government party by creating large numbers of wasted votes and a wide possibility for gerrymandering. Finally in the 1980s, this unfair system was discarded due to wide criticism, and the province adopted a consistent system of FPTP in single-seat districts. In the next election many CCF supporters chose the relatively unknown Social Credit Party, a minor party that had never held any seats in the British Columbia legislature, as their second choice. The Social Credit Party achieved an upset victory in the 1952 election, winning 19 seats in the 48-member legislature to 18 for the CCF, 6 for the Liberals and 4 for the Conservatives. The Socreds formed a short-lived minority government until the 1953 election, in which they won a majority of seats (28 of 48). After the 1953 election, the Liberal and renamed Progressive Conservative Parties were reduced to third parties in the province, and first-past-the-post was reinstated by the government.

IRV was also used for provincial elections in Alberta (1926–1955 in rural districts), and Manitoba (1927–1953) outside Winnipeg (excluding St. Boniface in 1949 and 1953). IRV was also used in provincial by-elections in these two provinces between 1924 and 1955.

IRV has never been used for federal elections.

IRV was used in city elections in Lethbridge from 1913 to 1927.

IRV was used to elect mayors in city elections when STV was used to elect city councillors. STV/IRV was used in 20 Canadian cities during the 20th Century.

IRV is used for certain party and private elections in Canada, including such large-scale elections at the Canadian Wheat Board, the 2006 Progressive Conservative Association of Alberta leadership election, where it has generated high turnout, and the 2011 British Columbia Liberal Party leadership election. The Liberal Party of Canada had adopted IRV with a national primary for its leadership elections.

In 2014, the Province of Ontario announced that municipalities would have the option to use IRV for local elections starting in 2018, and authorizing legislation was passed in 2016. London, Ontario became the first city to use ranked choice voting in 2018. Cambridge and Kingston were set to adopt IRV in the 2022 elections. However, in 2020, the Legislative Assembly of Ontario passed a law repealing the option to use IRV in municipal elections. As a result, every city in Ontario used the First Past the Post system in 2022, making the 2018 London election the only one to use IRV under this legislation.

Instant-runoff voting is used in whole or in part to elect the leaders of the three largest federal political parties in Canada: the Liberal Party of Canada, the Conservative Party of Canada, and the New Democratic Party, albeit the New Democratic Party uses a mixture of IRV and exhaustive voting, allowing each member to choose one format or the other for their vote (as was used in their 2017 leadership election). In 2013, members of the Liberal Party of Canada elected Justin Trudeau as party leader through IRV in a national leadership election. The Conservative Party used IRV (where each of the party's 338 riding associations are weighted equally, regardless of how many members voted in each riding) to elect Erin O'Toole as party leader in 2020, Andrew Scheer in 2017, and Stephen Harper in 2004.

=== Czech Republic ===
IRV is used to elect leaders of the Green party.

=== Estonia ===
The small Baltic state of Estonia held its first post-Soviet elections in 1992. It used a combination of IRV (for president) and STV (for legislators) — a system that had been popularized by Rein Taagepera, an expatriate Estonian political scientist at the University of California.

=== Hong Kong ===
IRV was used to elect a small number of functional constituencies of the Legislative Council of Hong Kong until the 2021 Hong Kong electoral changes.

=== Hungary ===
IRV has not been used for national or local elections. For the first time in 2024, a broad opposition primary election in the 12th district of Budapest was held via IRV, locally known as "instant multi-round voting" ("azonnali többfordulós szavazás"). Certain organizations, like the Two-Tailed Dog Party and some student unions use IRV to elect their officials.

=== India ===
IRV is used in numerous electoral college environments, including the election of the President of India by the members of the Parliament of India and of the Vidhan Sabhas – the state legislatures. The election is held with IRV, which in the Indian Constitution (Article 55) is called single transferable vote.

=== Ireland ===
All public elections in the Republic of Ireland are described as using the single transferable vote, or "proportional representation by the means of the single transferable vote". In the case of single-winner elections STV reduces to IRV, although neither "instant runoff voting" nor "alternative vote" is a commonly used name in Ireland. All constituencies for Dáil, Seanad, MEP, and local elections are multi-member (STV). Single-winner (IRV) elections include: all presidential elections; single-vacancy (Note: If there are multiple vacancies simultaneously in a single constituency, then a single STV election is held to fill all. This happened in two of the seven by-elections in the "mini general election" of 1925.) Dáil by-elections; all Seanad by-elections; and three of the seven Údarás na Gaeltachta constituencies (1999–2012). The Dáil elects a Taoiseach (prime minister) by majority motion, but since 2016 elects its Ceann Comhairle (speaker) by IRV ballot. Local authorities elect their cathaoirleach (chairperson) by exhaustive ballot, "non-instant" runoff voting. The Local Government Act 2019 provides for steps towards introducing directly elected mayors; the government's detailed proposal document implies IRV would be used to elect them. Referendums in Ireland currently require a binary yes/no question; in 2018 the Citizens' Assembly recommended allowing multiple-choice referendums with the result determined via IRV.

While most elections in the Republic of Ireland use the single transferable vote (STV), in single-winner contests this reduces to IRV. This is the case in all Presidential elections and Seanad panel by-elections, and most Dáil by-elections In the rare event of multiple simultaneous vacancies in a single Dáil constituency, a single STV by-election may be held; for Seanad panels, multiple IRV by-elections are held.

=== New Zealand ===
Multi-winner single transferable vote (STV) is used for all district health board elections in New Zealand. In 2004, several New Zealand cities and local authorities began to use STV for their elections—including the nation's second-largest city and capital, Wellington, and its fifth-largest city, Dunedin. Where electing a mayor directly, these cities used instant runoff voting. In 2007, for example, Wellington's mayor Kerry Prendergast was elected over 10 rivals on the 9th round of counting. Other IRV races that involved multiple rounds of counting included the 2010 Dunedin mayoral election and 2010 Wellington City mayoral election. As of September 2013, seven local authorities in New Zealand were elected using STV.

In the 1992 referendum on the voting method to elect members of the New Zealand House of Representatives, the alternative vote was one of the four alternative methods available (alongside MMP, STV and SM). IRV came third of the alternative methods (ahead of SM) with 7% of the vote. IRV, under the name preferential vote, was one of the four alternative methods choices presented in the 2011 voting method referendum, when the future of MMP was being decided. That referendum saw most New Zealanders choosing to keep their proportional method of representation, with IRV coming in last with 8% of the vote.

The New Zealand Labour Party in 2013 was using IRV to pick a new party leader.

IRV (again under the name preferential vote) was used on the initial ballot of the 2015–2016 New Zealand flag referendums for voters to choose among five flag options.

=== Papua New Guinea ===
A form of IRV has been used to elect members of parliament since last plurality voting election in 2002. Called "limited preferential voting" because voters are limited to ranking three candidates, the system has been credited with reducing election violence in a highly fractured political system. IRV has been used since 2003 for the national parliament election, where voters are limited to ranking three candidates.

=== United Kingdom ===
IRV is currently used in the United Kingdom for by-elections to the Northern Ireland Assembly and to local assemblies in Scotland, both of which use the single transferable vote method of proportional representation in regularly scheduled elections. It is used in its contingent vote form (also called the supplementary vote), for all direct elections for mayor in England, including in London. It is used to fill vacancies within the House of Lords, to elect the leaders of the Liberal Democrats and the Labour Party and for many private elections, including for Chancellor of Oxford University and rectorial elections at the University of Edinburgh. IRV was the electoral method available to select a replacement MEP by election for the Northern Ireland constituency of the European parliament, however now a party can co-opt a replacement without the need for a by-election.

IRV has been debated vigorously in the country since the early 20th century. In 1917, for example, the Speaker's Conference advocated the adoption of IRV for 358 of the 569 constituencies in the UK, and STV for the rest; its intention was that STV would be used in densely populated urban areas but, in order to keep constituencies from being too large, IRV would be used in more sparsely populated rural areas. Although the House of Commons voted in favour of the proposals five times, the House of Lords rejected it until the nationwide effort was ultimately abandoned in parliament.

In 1921 the Government of Ireland Act established two home rule parliaments in Ireland–the Parliament of Northern Ireland and the Parliament of Southern Ireland–and while STV was used for regular elections to these bodies, IRV was used for by-elections. This combination of IRV and STV has been used in what is now the Republic of Ireland ever since. The Northern Ireland Parliament continued to use the combination until the late 1920s when it switched to the 'first past the post' plurality system. However, STV for regular elections, and IRV for by-elections, has been reintroduced and used there to elect devolved assemblies since the 1970s.

IRV is usually referred to in the UK as the 'Alternative Vote' or 'AV'. In 1998 the Jenkins Commission, charged by the government with suggesting an alternative system to plurality, devised a new system called the Alternative Vote Plus (AV+) for elections to the British Parliament. This involved a combination of party-list proportional representation and single seat constituencies elected under IRV. However no action has been taken on the Commission's report.

In March 2009 the government announced that it would run an inquiry into the use of IRV at future general elections, and in February 2010 the House of Commons voted to hold a national referendum on AV. The government's term expired before this legislation was approved, but in July 2010, newly elected Deputy Prime Minister Nick Clegg announced a referendum on AV, subsequently held on 5 May 2011. The proposal would have affected the way in which Members of Parliament are elected to the British House of Commons at Westminster. It was only the second national referendum ever to be held within the United Kingdom and the result of the referendum was a decisive rejection of the adoption of the alternative vote by a margin of 67.9% to 32.1% of voters on a national turnout of 42%.

=== United States ===
Since 1912, IRV has been adopted and repealed in various United States jurisdictions.

Between 1912 and 1930, limited forms of RCV (typically with only two rankings) were implemented, with 24 cities using proportional RCV before repeal in some areas (Florida, Indiana, Maryland, Minnesota, and Wisconsin) Proportional RCV has been used continuously in Cambridge, Massachusetts since 1941.

Since 2002, IRV has been adopted by more than a dozen cities, with some adoptions pending implementation.

Jurisdictions that have implemented and then repealed IRV include Ann Arbor, Michigan (1974–1976); Pierce County, Washington (2006–2009); Burlington, Vermont (2005–2010); Aspen, Colorado (2007–2010); and in North Carolina (2006–2013).

As of October 2022, American cities and counties currently using IRV to elect at least one office included New York City, New York; Minneapolis, Minnesota; Oakland, California; St. Paul, Minnesota; Bloomington, Minnesota; Bloomington, Minnesota; St. Louis Park, Minnesota; San Francisco, California; Takoma Park, Maryland; Berkeley, California; San Leandro, California; Benton County, Oregon; Corvallis, Oregon; Portland, Maine; Cambridge, Massachusetts; Easthampton, Massachusetts; Eastpointe, Michigan; Santa Fe, New Mexico; Las Cruces, New Mexico; Basalt, Colorado; and Telluride, Colorado.

San Francisco's system of IRV was challenged in federal court, but a unanimous panel of the US Court of Appeals for the 9th Circuit upheld San Francisco's IRV law, finding that the plaintiff failed to establish that the City's chosen electoral system was unconstitutional.

Private organizations in the U.S. that use IRV include the Hugo Awards for science fiction, the Academy of Motion Picture Arts and Sciences in selection of the Oscar for Best Picture, and more than fifty colleges and universities for student elections.

Maine became the first U.S. state to approve IRV for its primary and general elections for governor, U.S. Senate, U.S. House and state legislature in a 2016 referendum. The state supreme court ruled this method of voting was unconstitutional for state general elections, but this ruling did not affect primary and federal elections. The state legislature attempted to repeal IRV for all elections unless the state constitution was amended, but this repeal was put on hold by a people's veto petition. The June 2018 primary election both used IRV to determine party candidates and Maine Question 1 passed, which blocked the repeal. Democrat Jared Golden became the first congressional candidate in the United States to win a general election as a result of IRV, defeating incumbent Republican Bruce Poliquin in second round balloting for Maine's 2nd congressional district in 2018. In the future, IRV will also be used for primary elections for federal elections and only primary elections for state offices. A bill passed in August 2019 will make Maine the first state to use IRV in presidential general elections in 2020, but use in presidential primaries has been delayed until 2024. The state of Alaska adopted RCV in 2020 with first use in 2022. It is used for all state and federal general elections. All uses except presidential election use the “top four” form, with an open primary advancing 4 candidates to the general election with RCV.

Six states planned to use RCV in the 2020 Democratic Party presidential primaries: Alaska, Hawaii, Kansas, and Wyoming for all voters; Iowa and Nevada for absentee voters. Rather than eliminating candidates until a single winner is chosen, voters' choices would be reallocated until all remaining candidates have at least 15%, the threshold to receive delegates to the convention.

== Elections conducted under IRV ==
=== Countries and regions ===
Country	Years in use	Notes
Australia	1918–present	From 1949, the single transferable vote method has been used for upper house legislative elections. Instant-runoff voting is used for lower house elections.
Canada		Used in whole or in part to elect the leaders of the three largest federal political parties in Canada: the Liberal Party of Canada, the Conservative Party of Canada, and the New Democratic Party, albeit the New Democratic Party uses a mixture of IRV and exhaustive voting, allowing each member to choose one format or the other for their vote.
Fiji	1998–2013	
Hong Kong	1998–present	Instant-runoff voting is only used in the 4 smallest of Hong Kong's 29 functional constituencies. Officially called preferential elimination voting, the system is identical to the instant-runoff voting.
Papua New Guinea	2007–present	Between 1964 and 1975, Papua New Guinea used a system that allowed voters the option of ranking candidates. Currently, voters can rank only their top three choices.
United States	2020	In their 2020 primaries, several states used a form of instant run-off in Democratic Party primaries. See also: Ranked-choice voting in the United States
Zimbabwe	1979–1985	Was only used for white candidates

=== Federal provinces or states ===
Province/state	Country	Years in use	Notes
Alaska	United States	2022–present	Approved by Alaska voters in 2020 via ballot measure.
Alberta	Canada	1924–1956	In districts outside Edmonton and Calgary (except Medicine Hat in 1926)
British Columbia	Canada	1952–1954	BC had mixture of single seat and two seat districts. IRV in two seat districts was done by each seat being filled through a separate contest and a voter in the district voting in both contests.
Maine	United States	2018–present	Originally approved by Maine voters as a 2016 ballot referendum to replace the First Past The Post system statewide, a 2017 state law sought to delay implementation of ranked-choice voting until 2021, to allow time for amending the state constitution. Supporters overrode the delay with a 2018 people's veto referendum that received a majority of votes, ensuring that ranked-choice voting would be used for future primary and federal elections.
Manitoba	Canada	1924–1955	In districts outside Winnipeg (except St. Boniface in 1949 and 1953)
New South Wales	Australia	1929–present	Since 1978, NSW has used the single transferable vote method to decide upper house legislative elections. IRV (Optional preferential voting) has been used for lower house elections since 1981. This means a voter can number one or all candidates.
North Carolina	United States	2006–2013	A state law in 2006 established instant-runoff voting for certain judicial elections, until a 2013 law repealed the practice.
Northern Territory	Australia	1980 only	
Ontario	Canada	2018–present	In 2016, the provincial government passed Bill 181, the Municipal Elections Modernization Act, which permitted municipalities to adopt ranked balloting in municipal elections. In the 2018 elections, the first ones conducted under the new legislation, the city of London used ranked balloting, while the cities of Kingston and Cambridge held referendums on whether to adopt ranked ballots for the next municipal elections in 2022.
Queensland	Australia	1962–present	Full preferential voting used 1962–1992 and since 2016.
South Australia	Australia	1929–present	Lower house only.
Tasmania	Australia	1909–present	Upper house only.
Victoria	Australia	1911–present	Lower house only; fully preferential since 1916.
Western Australia	Australia	1907–present	Lower house only; fully preferential since 1912.

=== Municipalities ===
City/town	Years in use	Notes
Ann Arbor, MI	1975 only	
Aspen, CO	2009 only	
Berkeley, CA	2010–present	
Burlington, VT	2005–2010; 2021–present	Repealed for mayoral elections after the 2009 election; in 2021 a referendum reinstated it for the city council elections.
Hendersonville, NC	2007–2013	part of a statewide pilot program, deauthorized in 2013
London, Ontario	2018–present	
Memphis, TN	2011–present	
Minneapolis, MN	2009–present	
New York City, NY	2021–present	
Oakland, CA	2010–present	
Portland, ME	2011–present	
San Francisco, CA	2004–present	
San Leandro, CA	2010–present	
Santa Fe, NM	2018–present	
St. Paul, MN	2011–present	
Takoma Park, MD	2006–present	
Telluride, CO	2011–present	

== How to Vote Cards ==
In Australia, HTVC which look like filled-in ballot are often handed out to voters before they enter the Polling Station.

In South Australia, the Electoral Commission publishes an official combined HTVC for all the candidates. There wants to be a limit on the number of candidates so that the size of the ballot paper kept reasonable.

== See also ==
- History and use of the Single Transferable Vote
- History and use of ranked voting
- Irish presidential election
