= Red Eureka Movement =

- Leader: Albert Langer
- Founded: 1977
- Dissolved: 1982
- Split from: CPA (M–L)
- Newspaper: Rebel
- Ideology: Communism; Marxism–Leninism; Maoism; Anti-revisionism
- Political position: Far-left

The Red Eureka Movement (REM) was an Australian communist and Maoist political party led by activist Albert Langer. It was active from 1977 to 1982. The party was formed as a splinter organization from the Communist Party of Australia (Marxist–Leninist) (CPAML) by activists who supported the Gang of Four against Hua Guofeng and Deng Xiaoping. REM denounced China under Deng as having taken the "capitalist road". The group was opposed to all other Australian Maoist organisations for a variety of reasons, and advocated for a global front to oppose the Soviet Union.

REM was based in Melbourne, and published a monthly journal titled Rebel, as well as another journal titled Discussion Bulletin, which published material that satirised the CPAML. The REM owned a bookstore named the "After Hours Bookstore" in Hoddle Street, Melbourne.

== See also ==
- List of anti-revisionist groups
