= History and use of the single transferable vote =

Historically, the single transferable vote (STV) electoral system has seen a series of relatively modest periods of usage and disusage at various locations around the world. Today it is increasingly popular as a goal of electoral reform, and many jurisdictions are proposing implementation of it as a method of proportional representation. STV has been used in many different local, regional and national electoral systems, as well as to elect various other types of bodies, around the world.

== Early history ==
The concept of transferable voting was proposed by Thomas Wright Hill in 1819.

In 1855 in Denmark, Carl Andræ proposed a multi-winner transferable vote system for elections in Denmark. Andræ's system was used in 1856 to elect the Danish Rigsdag, and by 1866 it was also adapted for indirect elections to the second chamber, the Landsting, until 1915.

The English barrister Thomas Hare is generally credited with the conception of Single Transferable Voting as we know it today, and he publicized the idea in his 1857 book Machinery of Representation. Hare's view was that STV should be a means of "making the exercise of the suffrage a step in the elevation of the individual character, whether it be found in the majority or the minority." In Hare's original STV system, he proposed that electors should have the opportunity of discovering which candidate their vote had ultimately counted for, to improve their personal connection with voting.

The noted political essayist, John Stuart Mill, was a friend of Hare and an early proponent of STV. He praised Hare's STV in his 1861 essay Considerations on Representative Government. His contemporary, Walter Bagehot, also praised the Hare system for allowing everyone to elect an MP, even ideological minorities, but added that the Hare system would create more problems than it solved: "[the Hare system] is inconsistent with the extrinsic independence as well as the inherent moderation of a Parliament – two of the conditions we have seen, are essential to the bare possibility of parliamentary government."

STV spread through the British Empire, leading it to be sometimes known as British Proportional Representation. In 1896, Andrew Inglis Clark was successful in persuading the Tasmanian House of Assembly to adopt what became known as the Hare-Clark system, named after himself and Thomas Hare.

In the late 1800s and 20th century, refinements were made to Hare's original system by Henry Richmond Droop, J.B. Gregory, Meek, Warren, Tideman, Wright and others.

== Australia ==
Australia uses several forms of ranked votes in different jurisdictions. The systems require voters to rank several, or all, of the candidates on the ballot, reducing or eliminating the possibility of exhausted votes.

Lower house elections for the Australian parliament and for all states except Tasmania use what they call STV (what others call Instant-runoff voting to elect a single member for an electorate.

At the Commonwealth level (national level) and in most states, upper houses use STV to elect multiple members to represent a state or district.

The Hare-Clark STV system is used in Tasmania's House of Assembly and the Australian Capital Territory (ACT) Legislative Assembly. Hare Clark uses the Droop quota and the Gregory Method for transfer of surplus votes. During the count fractional votes are recorded under a separate heading for simplicity sake. On the ballot, candidates' names are placed within the column for each party and are randomised by Robson Rotation rather than alphabetical. Casual vacancies are filled by the countback method, which involves recounting the original ballots to elect one of the candidates who stood but failed to be elected in the last election.

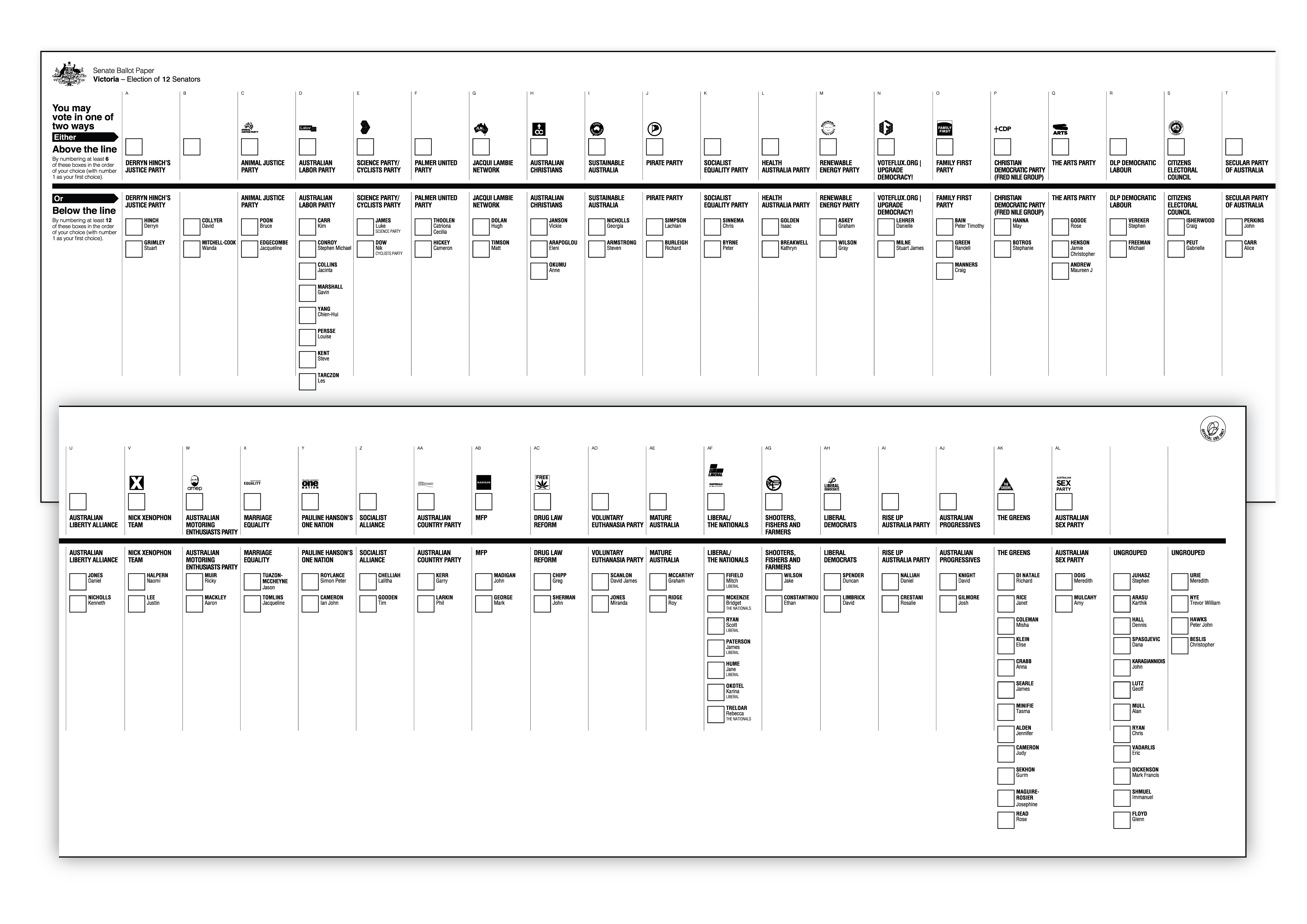
Australian Senate ballot paper used in Victoria for 2016

The Australian Senate and the upper houses of New South Wales, South Australia, Victoria and Western Australia use STV to elect multiple members with the option of voting "above the line". Queensland has a unicameral legislature — that is, it does not have an upper house.

The Group Voting Ticket or Ticket-Voting system is in use in Victoria, and was used in the Senate from 1984 to 2013, in New South Wales from 1987 to 2003 and in South Australia from 1985 to 2018. Western Australia used it from 1987 until the 2021 election, but legislation has been introduced to abolish it. The votes are counted in the basically same way as under Hare-Clark, but when casting votes, voters have the option of selecting one single group "above the line", instead of numbering individual candidates below the line. Groups of candidates (usually, but not inevitably, corresponding to political parties) may each pre-register one ranked list of all the candidates (or, in some systems, two lists) and the votes above the line for each ticket are deemed to have numbered the candidates in the order pre-specified on the team's list (if the team lodged two lists, 50% of the votes go to each version). Casual vacancies are usually filled by the house of parliament with the vacancy, though there may be a requirement by law or convention to select a nominee of the out-going member's party.

Where Group Voting Tickets are now abolished, an "above the line" vote is equivalent to a vote for all candidates in one group in order, but the elector may choose to number additional boxes to express preferences for other groups.

The Senate, News South Wales, South Australia, Victoria and Western Australia (pending legislation) allow optional preferential voting, so a voter does not have to complete every square.

Each form has its pros and cons. The Hare-Clark system with Robson Rotation is advocated on the grounds that the effect of 'donkey voting' is reduced because of the randomised ordering, and the absence of the group voting tickets creates more personal accountability. The alternative system is advocated on the grounds that informal voting (spoiled ballots) is reduced because only one number need be written; on the other hand, it greatly increases the potential for tactics by parties as they have direct control of a large percentage of the vote. Over 90% of voters vote "above the line" instead of ranking their own preferences in detail. As a result, the informal rate reduced from around 10 percent, to around three percent.

| Jurisdiction | Body elected | "Above the line" | Group tickets | Vacancies | Surplus votes transfer method | Seats per constituency | Year introduced |
|---|---|---|---|---|---|---|---|
| Federal Parliament | Senate | Yes (1987–present) | No (in use 1987–2016) | Appointment | All ballots at fractional value (Inclusive Gregory) | 2 (ACT, NT) or 6 (states) (2 or 12 at a double dissolution) | 1948 |
| Australian Capital Territory | Legislative Assembly | No | No | Countback | Last parcel of ballots at fractional value Gregory (simple) | 5 | 1993 |
| New South Wales | Legislative Council | Yes (1987–present) | No (in use 1987–2003) | Appointment (formerly highest runner-up of same team) | Surplus ballots only at full value | 21 | 1978 |
| South Australia | Legislative Council | Yes (1985–present) | No (in use 1985–2018) | Appointment | All ballots at fractional value (Inclusive Gregory) | 11 | 1973 |
| Tasmania | House of Assembly | No | No | Countback | Last parcel of ballots at fractional value, Gregory (simple) | 7 (previously 5) | 1907 |
| Victoria | Legislative Council | Yes (1988–present) | Yes (1988–present) | Election by joint sitting of Council and Assembly (must be from the same party if vacated member was elected under a party; otherwise, must be non-partisan) | All ballots at fractional value (Inclusive Gregory) | 5 | |
| Western Australia | Legislative Council | Yes (1987–present) | No (in use 1987–2021) | Countback | All ballots at fractional value (Inclusive Gregory) | 6 (37 (pending)) | 1987 |

== Canada ==
STV was used in provincial elections in two provinces and city elections in 20 cities and municipalities in the 1917 to 1971 period. All these elections used the Droop quota. For transfers of surplus votes, most of them used the whole vote method. Only Calgary city elections used the Gregory fractional method. STV was used in Winnipeg for provincial elections to elect ten MLAs from 1920 to 1949. Barring the short-lived experience of Ireland electing 19 in a contest in 1925, this was the largest District Magnitude (number of members elected in single contest) in any legislative election anywhere in the world until New South Wales began to elect 21 in its elections starting in 1990.

| Jurisdiction | Body elected | "Above the line" | Group tickets | Vacancies | Surplus Vote Transfer method | Seats/constituency | Year introduced |
|---|---|---|---|---|---|---|---|
| Manitoba | Legislative Assembly | No, only votes for candidates allowed | No | Seat left empty until next general election | Surplus ballots only, at full value | 10 1920–1945 2 or 4 per district 1949, 1953 | 1920 (cancelled in 1955) |
| Alberta | Legislative Assembly | No, only votes for candidates allowed | No | by-election | Surplus ballots only, at full value | Edmonton 5-7 Calgary 5–6 | 1924 (cancelled in 1956) |
| Winnipeg | Winnipeg City Council (aldermen) | No | No | filled at next election (staggered terms) in by-election | Surplus ballots only at full value | 6 (3 per district elected in each election) | 1920 (cancelled 1970) |
| Calgary | Calgary City Council (aldermen) | No | No | next election (staggered terms) | All ballots at fractional value (Inclusive Gregory) | 1917-1960 6-9 (depending on resignations). 1960-1970 2 per district (1 per district elected in each election, unless extra empty seat due to resignation, etc.). 1971 2 per district | 1917 (in use to 1961, then intermittently, replaced mostly by IRV, (depending on resignations) to 1971, 1971 STV used to elect all city councillors, in two-seat districts. |
| Edmonton | Edmonton City Council (aldermen) | No | No | next election (staggered terms) | Surplus ballots only, at full value | 5-7 (depending on resignations) | 1923 (cancelled in 1928) |

Other cities that used STV include Vancouver, Victoria, Nelson, Port Coquitlam, New Westminster, Saskatoon, Regina, Moose Jaw, North Battleford, St. Boniface and Lethbridge (1928 only).

=== Federal elections in Canada ===
==== Senate ====
Under the proposed Bill C-43 before the Parliament of Canada during the 39th Parliament – 1st Session (April 3, 2006 – September 14, 2007), STV would have been used for consultative elections of Senators.

=== Alberta ===
STV-PR was used in the Calgary and Edmonton electoral districts for electing Members of the Alberta Legislative Assembly from 1926 to 1955, with five, six or seven MLAs being elected at-large in each city. Medicine Hat used STV for the 1926 election only, electing two MLAs. Between 1924 and 1955, all other electoral districts used instant-runoff voting alternative voting / preferential voting. As well, by-elections held in Edmonton, Calgary and Winnipeg between 1924 and 1956 used IRV. In 1958 the cities were divided into many single-member constituencies, and all MLAs were elected in single-member first past the post elections.

As well, STV was used for city elections in Calgary from 1917 to 1961 and in 1971; Edmonton city elections from 1923 to 1927 and Lethbridge in 1928.

=== British Columbia ===
Many British Columbia (BC) cities used multi-member at-large districts for their municipal elections at one point, including Vancouver, Victoria, New Westminster and Nelson. Two types of voting were used at different times – - Plurality block voting during most periods, and between 1917 and 1926, many used the single transferable vote.

Provincially, British Columbia used a mixture of voting methods to elect their members of the Legislative Assembly (MLAs): single-member districts using first-past-the-post and multi-member districts using plurality block voting. Elections in BC from the province's creation until the 1990 election were held under a mix of multi-member and single-member districts, with district types often being changed back and forth from one election to the next. Through almost all of BC's history, seats were filled by plurality elections. The only exceptions were the 1952 and 1953 elections where Instant-runoff voting was used. In 1952 and 1953, seats in multi-seat districts were filled through separate contests for each seat.)

After 1953, the SoCred government abolished the [Instant-runoff voting] and returned the province to the province's traditional mixed system of plurality block voting in multiple-member constituencies and FPTP contests in single-member districts. The change-back benefited the government party by creating large numbers of wasted votes and a wide possibility for gerrymandering. Finally in the 1980s, this unfair system was discarded due to wide criticism, and the province adopted a consistent system of FPTP in single-seat districts.

Further electoral reform was discussed in the 1990s, particularly after the CCF, now the British Columbia New Democratic Party (BC NDP), was re-elected for a second time that decade in the 1996 election. While the NDP won a majority of seats in the election, the opposition Liberals had won a larger share of the popular vote. After the Liberals won the 2001 election, they created the Citizens' Assembly on Electoral Reform.

The Assembly surprised many when it proposed an STV electoral model called BC-STV and recommended it to the electorate. In the ensuing electoral reform referendum held on May 17, 2005, BC-STV achieved a majority 57.7% Yes support. However, this did not give it the 60% province-wide support set as a requirement by the Liberal government for the referendum outcome to be automatically binding. Nevertheless, the "Yes" simple majority support in 77 provincial districts (out of 79) far exceeded the 48-riding level that had also been specified as a requirement.

Due to the evident support for electoral reform, the re-elected BC Liberal government announced in the Throne Speech on September 12, 2005, that the public of British Columbia would get a second referendum on STV in November 2008. This was later rescheduled: the second referendum on electoral reform was then planned to be held in conjunction with the May 12, 2009 provincial general election. In the interim, the Electoral Boundaries Commission designed new boundaries for both FPTP and STV. Both supporting and opposing sides of the referendum campaign received government funding to help educate the public in time for the referendum. In contrast to the 2005 vote, which saw 57.7% of voters in favour of STV, the STV initiative was then defeated on May 12, 2009, with only 39% of voters in support.

=== Manitoba ===
Provincial elections in Manitoba were conducted partly by STV from 1920 until 1958:

- Winnipeg was constituted as a ten-member constituency in 1920 for that year's election, while the other single-member constituencies had to wait until 1924 for the adoption of instant run-off voting which was first used in the 1927 election.
- In 1949, after considerable debate, Winnipeg was divided into three four-member constituencies, MLAs elected through STV, and St. Boniface was made into a two-member constituency, whose MLAs were elected through STV.

In 1955, Manitoba changed to single-member districts and began to use first past the post voting, which was implemented in the 1958 election.

Municipal elections in Winnipeg, Transcona, St. James and St. Vital were also conducted by STV from 1920 to 1971.

=== Ontario ===
The municipal election act used for elections to all of Ontario's municipal councils was amended in 2016, allowing municipalities the option to institute a ranked ballot. Ontario's municipalities have a variety of electoral configurations: some with all single-member districts, some with all multi-member districts, some electing members at-large, and some using a mixture of these approaches; the relevant regulations outline the use of instant-runoff voting where a single representative is to be elected and STV where multiple representatives are to be elected.

In the 2018 Ontario municipal elections, only one council, that of the City of London, was elected using a ranked-choice ballot. As London exclusively uses single-member districts, its election system was instant-runoff voting and not STV. The next opportunity for a municipality to potentially adopt STV was the 2022 Ontario municipal elections. However, the Ontario government repealed the option to use ranked ballots in 2020.

=== Saskatchewan ===
The city of Saskatoon used STV for its municipal elections 1920-1930 and 1938–1942.

As well, Regina, Moose Jaw and North Battleford also used the system in the early 1920s.

== Estonia ==
The system was used once: for the 18 March 1990 Estonian Supreme Soviet election, which was one of the four elections between 1989 and 1992 in the process that led to the restoration of independence of Estonia from the Soviet Union. The local elections in December 1989 were also held with this system, which served as a dress rehearsal with the law finally enacted on 4 December 1989.

The choice of STV was the result of a debate on voting systems led by the influential Estonian political scientist and émigré Rein Taagepera, who penned articles in Edasi in 1988, published Seats and Votes in 1989, and gave conferences on the topic. STV was not, however, Taagepera's own preference, but was rather the result of a consensus driven by Peet Kask between the outgoing Communist local officials, who sought a system that favored their popular names over their unpopular party brand, and the principle of proportional representation favored by the new parties.

The electoral system has been praised as a factor of political moderation that helped accommodate Russians in Estonia into the new political structure.

However, just before the Constitution of Estonia was enacted in 1992, a new electoral law was passed on 20 April 1992 for the recreated Riigikogu, choosing instead an open party list proportional representation system with a 5% threshold, similar to many other countries of continental Europe. The ACE Electoral Knowledge Network cites the "complex intricacies of an STV count" as one of the reasons for the change.

== Hong Kong ==
For the 1995 election of Hong Kong's 60-member Legislative Council, STV was used to elect the 10-member Election Committee constituency. Following the 1997 transfer to Chinese sovereignty, the method changed to plurality-at-large voting.

== Hungary ==
The Common Country Movement (KOM) proposed using STV for electing representatives of non-resident nationals to the National Assembly in 2017, but the bill brought to parliament by five opposition parties was dismissed by the governing coalition.

== India ==
STV was used in 1920 to elect members for Bengal and Madras.

STV is not used for direct elections in India, but is used for the indirect election of most members of the Rajya Sabha, the upper house of the federal parliament. The Rajya Sabha consists of 250 members: twelve are nominated by the President of India while the remainder are elected using STV by members of the legislatures of the states and the union territories. The number of members of the Rajya Sabha elected by each state and union territory is loosely proportionate to its population, such that, as of 2006, Bihar, with a population of 82 million, is represented by 22 members, while Sikkim, with a population of 540,000 is represented by just one member.

In addition, the federal president and vice-president are indirectly elected by MPs using alternative vote, which is STV applied to one vacancy at a time.

== Malta ==
STV has been used in all elections in Malta since 1921. Its 65 members of the House of Representatives are elected in 13 five-seat districts. As well, top-up seats (similar to the additional member system) may be added in the national parliament to ensure that a party with a majority of first-preference votes wins a majority of seats. This mechanism was brought in as a response to the controversial 1981 election when the Nationalist Party won 51% of the first-preference vote but the Labour Party won a majority of the seats. Some subsequently accused Labour of having gerrymandered the five-seat constituencies: eight had narrowly split 3:2 in its favour, while five had more widely split 3:2 in favour of the Nationalists. The top-up rule was also invoked in 1987 for the benefit of the Nationalists and in 1996 for the benefit of the Labour Party.

The Maltese electorate largely does not take advantage of the cross-party voting opportunities provided by STV. Almost all voters give preferences to all the candidates from one of the two major parties, but do not give preferences to candidates from the other party. Third parties, meanwhile, get minimal support. The effect of this voting pattern is similar to a tight two-party open list PR system simultaneously using STV within each party to decide its representatives whilst using the indicated first preference candidate's party as the voter's preferred party. Because of the transfer behaviour of the voters, each party can stand many more candidates than there are winners in total without being adversely affected. The large number of candidates is useful when casual vacancies occur as unsuccessful candidates fill the empty seats through countback between general elections. Strangely, some candidates stand and are elected in more than one constituency, leading to vacancies filled by countback.

== New Zealand ==
In New Zealand STV is used in elections to some local authorities and in elections for all the District Health Boards. The count is conducted using Meek's method. District Health Boards consist of a mixture of appointed and elected members. The vast majority of local authorities use plurality at large (bloc voting) instead of STV. Current use of STV was introduced by the Local Electoral Act 2001 and began with elections to local councils and District Health Boards in October 2004

During the 20th century STV was used for elections to the Christchurch City Council in 1917, 1929, 1931 and 1933, and for Woolston Borough Council in 1917 and 1919. In business, Fonterra used STV for their board of directors and Shareholders' Council elections in 2002.

The Local Electoral Act 2001 provided that STV was mandatory for District Health Board elections but offered local councils the choice of either staying with plurality at large or changing to STV. It also provided for a binding poll of voters in an area to be held to determine which system would be used, either at the initiative of the council or by a citizen's initiative instigated by voters in an area.

As of September 2013, seven local authorities are elected with STV: Dunedin City Council, Greater Wellington Council, Kapiti Coast District Council, Marlborough District Council, Palmerston North City Council, Porirua City Council, and Wellington City Council. Wellington upheld STV in a 2008 ballot measure. Multi-member wards in these cities use STV.

In 2022, 15 local authorities were using STV.

In practice very few local authorities adopted STV under the Act's provisions, and in those that did the use of STV was plagued by poor explanations of the STV process, which often gave little more information than an algorithmic description of how to place a vote. This left the unfortunate impression among voters that STV was little more than a gratuitously complex equivalent to existing voting mechanisms. Nonetheless, New Zealand made history by becoming the first country in the world to use the advanced Meek's method of STV.

In the 2004 elections 81 STV elections occurred, two of which were not contested. There was some confusion caused by the fact that some local elections involved election of variety of local government bodies, some elected by single-winner plurality ("first past the post"), some by plurality at large, and some by STV. Due to low voter turnout, the large number of spoilt votes and the long time taken for results to be declared, the Justice and Electoral Committee of the Parliament of New Zealand undertook an inquiry into the use of STV in New Zealand.

== Ireland ==
"Proportional representation by means of the single transferable vote" (commonly called "proportional representation" rather than "single transferable vote") is used for all public elections in the Republic of Ireland, except that single-winner elections (presidential elections and single-vacancy by-elections) reduce to instant-runoff voting. The most important elections in the Republic are those to Dáil Éireann, the house of representatives of the Oireachtas (parliament). The Dáil is directly elected from constituencies of between three and five seats. The Irish constitution specifies a minimum size of three seats and, although there is no maximum size, there have been no constituencies of more than five seats since 1947. (In 1944 there were three 7-seat districts and several five- and three-seat districts.)

In Seanad Éireann, Ireland's senate, six seats are filled from two three-seat university constituencies, while 43 seats are elected on vocational panels are filled on a restricted franchise from five panels of between five and eleven seats. The panel election rules depart from true STV by requiring a minimum number of candidates to be elected from each of two sub-panels; in the 2007 Cultural and Educational Panel election Ann Ormonde was elected despite having fewer votes than Terence Slowey when Slowey was eliminated.

STV is also used in local and European elections, and is common in private organisations, such as student unions. However, some representatives on the Senate of the National University of Ireland are elected by cumulative voting.

All votes are paper ballots completed and counted manually. Electronic voting was trialled in some constituencies in the 2002 election, but discontinued due to concerns about the lack of an audit trail. Irish STV elections use the simple Hare method of surplus transfers, except for the Senate panels, which use the Gregory method. A ballot need only rank a single candidate to be deemed valid; the quota is not recalculated to take account of exhausted ballots, which means candidates may be elected without reaching the quota.

| Body elected | Vacancies | Seats/constituency |
|---|---|---|
| Dáil Éireann | By-election using STV/IRV (Note: True STV is only used if multiple casual vacancies are being filled in a single by-election; a single-vacancy by-election reduces to IRV. Two of the seven by-elections at the March 1925 Dáil by-elections were two-seat STV; all others have been IRV.) | 3–5 |
| Seanad Éireann | By-election using IRV (Note: Multiple simultaneous vacancies result in multiple single-winner by-elections rather than one multiple-winner by-election. An example was the two by-elections for the Industrial and Commercial Panel on 14 May 1956.) | 3–11 |
| Local government | Co-option (Note: If the departee was nominated for election or co-option by a registered political party, that party nominates the replacement. Formerly a convention, this became law in 2001 and applies even if the departee had left the party. Councils set their own standing orders for replacing an independent: most choose a nominee or known ally of the departee (e.g. Galway, Donegal). Cork City Council formerly chose the highest-polling unelected candidate from the departee's local electoral area (LEA) at the previous local election. In 2019 a co-option vote on Waterford City and County Council was won 25–5 by a resigning independent's nominee against a Sinn Féin nominee.) | 3–7 (Note: The 2018 LEA Boundary Committees' terms of reference specified a minimum of five seats except "in particular compelling circumstances ... where otherwise the geographic size of the area would be disproportionately large".) (2019); 4–10 (Note: The 2012–13 LEA Boundary Committee's terms of reference specified a seat range of 6–10 and applied to all areas except Cork City Council, which retained its older LEAs with 4–7 seats.) (2014) |
| European Parliament | Replacement list | 3–4 |

=== History ===
STV was first used in Ireland in the Dublin University constituency in the 1918 Westminster election. The 1917 Speaker's Conference had recommended STV for all multi-seat Westminster constituencies, but it was only applied to university constituencies. With the growth of revolutionary Irish nationalism in Ireland, STV was introduced at local level by the UK government to ensure unionist minority representation in nationalist-majority areas and vice versa; however, minority representation did not always occur in practice. STV was first applied in the 1919 Sligo borough election under the Sligo Corporation Act 1918 (8 & 9 Geo. 5. c. xxiii), a local act of Parliament sponsored by the corporation after representations from a mainly-Protestant group of leading ratepayers. The Local Government (Ireland) Act 1919 (9 & 10 Geo. 5. c. 19) extended STV universally from the 1920 local elections, and the Government of Ireland Act 1920 (10 & 11 Geo. 5. c. 67) applied it to the 1921 Irish elections. The 1922 Constitution of the Irish Free State mandated proportional representation, and STV was specified in statute law.

In 1925 19 Seanad members were elected using STV in state-wide contest.

Initially 46% of Dáil members were elected from constituencies of seven, eight or nine seats, until 1935 when seven seats became the largest size. Since 1947 Dáil constituencies have been no larger than five seats. The 60 members of the Free State Seanad were intended to be directly elected, one of four cohorts every three years, with the state forming a single 15-seat STV constituency. The only such election was in 1925, for 19 seats (15 scheduled plus 4 casual vacancies). There were 78 candidates on the ballot paper, counting took two weeks, and many independents were elected. The process was seen as too cumbersome, and so indirect election by Oireachtas members was introduced for subsequent Seanad elections.

Two attempts were made by Fianna Fáil governments to abolish STV and replace it with the first past the post plurality system. Both attempts were rejected by voters in referendums held in 1959 and again in 1968. In the past, gerrymandering was also attempted by several governments, in particular by varying the sizes (that is, the number of seats) of particular constituencies. This attempt backfired, however, in the 1977 general election when a larger than expected vote-swing caused a tipping effect resulting in disproportionate losses for the government. This botched attempt at Gerrymandering became known as the "Tullymander" after minister James Tully. Since 1977, constituencies have been drawn up by an independent Constituency Commission under terms of reference given by the Minister for the Environment. Elections from 1932 to 1987 resulted in either a single-party Fianna Fáil government or a coalition of two or more of the other parties. Since 1989, every government has been a coalition.

From 1941 to 1965, the city councils of Cork, Limerick and Waterford were each elected in a single local electoral area (LEA), returning 21, 17, (Note: Increased from 15 in 1950.) and 15 councillors respectively. Electoral law empowered the minister for local government to split county boroughs into multiple LEAs only if the council requested; these councils did not do so, as a majority of councillors were independents or from small parties and feared that smaller LEAs would favour the large parties. The Electoral Act 1963 allowed the minister to act unilaterally and the boroughs were divided in time for the 1967 local elections. The change was justified on the basis that the ballots were long and unwieldy and many votes were wasted when ballots were exhausted. The LEAs defined under the Local Government Reform Act 2014 return between 6 and 10 councillors; the Fine Gael–led government formed after the 2016 election was considering reducing these sizes.

From 1979 to 2012, some members of Údarás na Gaeltachta were elected by STV from Gaeltacht constituencies: from 1979 to 1999, 7 of 13 members were elected from 2- or 3-seat constituencies; from 1999 to 2012, 17 of 20 were elected from constituencies returning 1 to 6 members.

== United Kingdom ==
STV is not used for elections to the UK Parliament at Westminster but is used for all Assembly, local government and previously European elections in Northern Ireland, and for local elections in Scotland, and will also be used for local elections in Wales starting in 2022. In Northern Ireland, Assembly elections involve five-seat constituencies, while local elections currently use constituencies of between five and seven seats. For European elections between 1979 and 2019, Northern Ireland serves as a single three-seat constituency. Local elections in Scotland use constituencies of three or four seats. All official STV elections in the UK use the Gregory method of counting votes.

STV is also used by many private organisations. For example, it is used in many British university students' unions (and promoted by the National Union of Students as the fairest way of running elections), for all elections within the University of Cambridge and for electing board members in The Co-operative Group.

Because it was re-invented by the Englishman Thomas Hare (Carl Andræ having proposed one in 1855) and has been used in many parts of the former British Empire, STV has in the past been referred to as "British proportional representation". Nonetheless, it has never been used by more than a handful of constituencies in the British Parliament. In 1917, the Speaker's Conference in the United Kingdom advocated the adoption of STV for 211 of the 569 constituencies in the UK, and instant-runoff voting for the rest, and the Representation of the People Bill was introduced in Parliament that year. The House of Commons and the House of Lords engaged in an extended series of amendments and counter-amendments, in which the House of Commons kept trying to replace the STV provisions of the bill with the Alternative Vote scheme, and the House of Lords tried to reinstate the STV provisions. In the end, the House of Commons agreed to strip all preferential voting provisions in return for agreeing to discuss introducing STV in 100 seats in the future (the House of Commons subsequently reneged on this commitment later in 1918). Nonetheless, in 1918 STV was adopted for the university constituencies of Cambridge, Oxford, Combined English Universities, Combined Scottish Universities and Dublin University; these constituencies continued to use STV until their abolition in 1950 (or 1922 in the case of Dublin University). STV was also introduced for local elections in the Irish borough of Sligo in 1918, and extended to all Irish local government shortly afterwards.

=== Northern Ireland ===
In 1921 the UK government attempted to establish two home rule parliaments in Ireland–the Parliament of Southern Ireland and the Parliament of Northern Ireland–with the Irish general elections of 1921, both of which were conducted using STV. The intention of using STV in Ireland was partly to ensure adequate representation for the Catholic minority in the North and the Protestant minority in the South. Southern Ireland seceded from the UK in 1921 but today, as the Republic of Ireland, continues to use STV for all of its elections. The Northern Ireland Parliament continued to use STV until 1929 when it switched to the first-past-the-post plurality system. However STV was reintroduced there after the imposition of direct rule in 1973 (after the Northern Irish government collapsed because of sectarian violence in the region), and is now in use for all elections except those to Westminster.

=== Scotland ===
In Scotland, following the passage of the Local Governance (Scotland) Act 2004 (asp 9) on 23 June 2004, all local governments have used STV to elect their councillors since 2007.

=== Wales ===
In Wales, the Richard Commission recommended in March 2004 changing the electoral system for the National Assembly for Wales (now Senedd Cymru or the Welsh Parliament, simply Senedd) to STV. However, in the white paper Better Governance for Wales published on 15 June 2005, the UK Government, without giving reasons, rejected Richard's recommendation to change the electoral system. STV was later introduced for council elections starting from 2022 after the Senedd passed the Local Government and Elections (Wales) Act 2021. The Act gives an option for local councils to switch to STV if the individual council desires so.

== United States ==
=== History in the United States ===
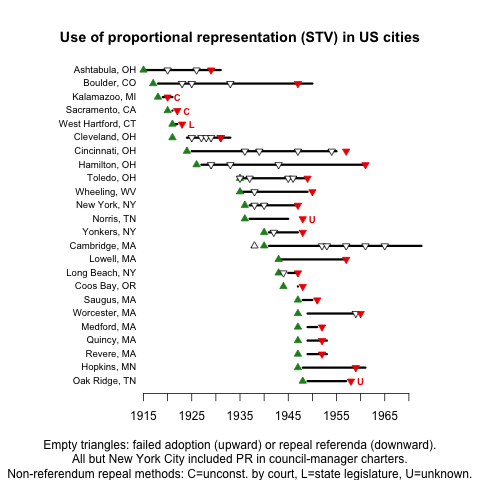
Adoption and repeal of the Single Transferable Vote in United States municipal elections

As of 2016, the only official governing bodies that use STV to elect representatives are the City Council and School Committee of Cambridge, Massachusetts, and the Board of Estimate and Taxation (2 members) and the Park and Recreation Board (3 members) of Minneapolis, Minnesota. Since then Portland, Oregon and several other cities have adopted STV. However, STV was more widely used in the United States in the first half of the 20th century.

Twenty-two American cities have used STV for local elections. It was first used in North America in Ashtabula, Ohio, in 1915. It was used for the election of the nine-member city council of Cincinnati, Ohio, from 1924 to 1957, and was also used in Cleveland, Ohio and Sacramento, California. New York City adopted STV in 1936 as a method for breaking the corrupt political machine of Tammany Hall dominating the city and used it for five elections from 1937 to 1945. Except in Ashtabula and New York City, STV was part of a council–manager city charter adopted at the same time. STV was included in the National Municipal League's model city charter from 1914 to 1964. Every adoption was by initiative, where a petition forced a referendum or simple adoption of STV. The typical adoption coalition included a city's minority party (either the Republican or Democratic party machine) and other groups seeking increased representation.

African-Americans and political minorities such as supporters of the Communists and urban Republicans used STV to win seats. And opponents of political reform challenged STV after these successes. Only two of the first 24 repeal efforts in cities around the nation were successful, but after World War II, harsh campaigns against STV were successfully carried out. After STV's removal and subsequent reversion to the current FPTP in New York in 1947, the Democratic Party immediately regained near unanimous control of municipal elections with Tammany Hall quickly returning to political dominance until its ultimate downfall in the mid-1960s. STV has also been used in the election of New York City community school board members.

More recently, there have been other campaigns in some cities to introduce STV. Davis, California passed an advisory referendum to use STV for future city council elections. The community school boards of the City of New York used STV until the school boards themselves were abolished in 2002. The city of San Francisco in 1996 considered multimember STV in a referendum; this effort failed, with the city instead voting for district elections and, in 2002, adopting instant runoff voting. Cincinnati also narrowly failed to restore STV for city council elections in citizen initiatives in 1988 and 1991.

STV has become increasingly used at American universities for student government elections. As of 2017, the schools of Carnegie Mellon, MIT, Oberlin, Princeton, Reed, UC Berkeley, UC Davis, Vassar, and Whitman all use STV, and several other universities are considering its adoption.

The proposed Fair Representation Act would require multi-member districts for elections to the US House of Representatives which would then be elected by STV. States with only one representative would instead have elections by instant runoff voting.

== NGOs ==
Many non-governmental organisations also use STV. Most Australian political parties, unions and peak business organisations use STV. All National Union of Students of the United Kingdom, Cambridge Union, and Oxford Union elections and those of their constituent members are under the system. It is used as well by ESIB – The National Unions of Students in Europe. It is used in several political parties for internal elections such as the British Liberal-Democrats, all the British Green Parties, the Green Party of the United States and the Green Party of California. It is also used to elect members of the General Synod of the Church of England. The UK Royal Statistical Society uses STV with Meek's method to elect their council. Some Unitarian Church groups have used Single Transferable Vote to select projects for funding.

The Electoral Reform Society uses STV to elect members of their board.

Twin Oaks Community uses a version of STV they call Fair-Share Spending to elect projects and set their budgets. The US-Based Pacifica Radio Network uses STV to elect its station governing boards. The Object Management Group (OMG) uses STV for their Architecture Board (AB) elections.

The selection of nominees for Academy Awards is via an STV ballot of the members of the Academy of Motion Picture Arts and Sciences. Differences from STV are that voters may only rank as many choices as nominees (five for most categories, with ten for best picture), and that at least one first preference is required for a candidate to be successful. Selection of a winner from among the nominees is done using plurality voting.

== See also ==
- History and use of ranked voting
