= Langer vote =

Now informal voting method in Australia

A Langer vote was a style of voting in the Australian electoral system designed to avoid the requirement to express preferences for all candidates without the vote being rejected as informal. The title is a tribute to Albert Langer, an Australian political activist, who advocated for the use of this style as a de facto method of optional preferential voting for making a valid vote for the voter's preferred candidates while the deliberate "error" avoided the vote being counted for one of the major political parties.

Voters were advised to mark 1, 2, . .n, for favoured candidates, but to mark a repetition of the next digit against each of the remaining candidates. For example, a vote would be marked 1, 2, 3, 3, 3. The votes for the first and second candidates would be counted but the remaining candidates would then not receive preferences. From 1983 this was a valid vote, however since 1998 the Electoral Act requires that there be no repeated numbers.

== History ==
Preferential voting was introduced in Federal elections in 1918. While voting was voluntary at the time, a valid vote was required to express a preference for every candidate, described as full preferential voting, and a failure to mark ballots in consecutive numerical order meant that the vote was informal. This was confirmed by the High Court in a case concerning the 1928 election. This was a half senate election in which 3 senators were to be elected for Victoria. 6 candidates were nominated, however Maj Gen John Forsyth died before the ballot. Most ballot papers were reprinted with just the 5 remaining candidates. The Labor how-to-vote card had Forsyth listed as #5 and more than 11,000 ballots had numbered the candidates 1, 2, 3, 4 & 6. Starke J noted that the Electoral Act required that a ballot paper being given effect according to the voter's intention so far as his intention is clear and accepted that in this case the voters preferences were clear. Despite this however Starke J held that the Electoral Act "absolutely and imperatively" required that a voter use consecutive numbers so that the votes were properly rejected as informal.

In 1983 the Joint Select Committee on Electoral Reform was concerned at the informality rate for Senate voting. The Electoral Act was amended so that while a voter was formally required to express a preference for all candidates, a vote that erroneously did not comply with this requirement was saved from being rejected as informal. Subsection 270(1) applied to the Senate and subsection 270(2) to the House of Representatives.

=== 1987 election ===
In 1987 Harold Van Moorst and Langer were part of "The Coalition Against Poverty and Unemployment" and were urging people to either (1) not vote at the election on 11 July 1987 (2) to deliberately vote informally or (3) informing electors of the effect of section 270 of the Electoral Act, set out in a document headed "How not to give preferences" so that electors could avoid voting for the major parties. The Australian Electoral Commission applied to the Supreme Court of Victoria for an order preventing Van Moorst from encouraging people not to vote. Langer was added as a defendant at his own request. Murphy J granted the injunction until the defendants could put on evidence and the matter could be heard. After hearing the evidence on 2 July, Vincent J held that it was an offence not to vote and an offence to incite people not to vote. Vincent J also held it was an offence to use a representation of a ballot paper to vote other than in accordance with the directions on the ballot paper and granted injunctions to prevent Van Moorst or Langer distributing documents to that effect. Van Moorst and Langer did have some measure of success however in that Vincent J held that it was not an offence to vote informally, nor to inform voters as to the effect of s 270 of the Electoral Act, holding that .

The system of compulsory voting requires that electors record votes at each election. It is, of course, integral to the operation of that system that all electors make choices. It is not integral that they must choose between the candidates or that, contrary to the dictates of their consciences, they must vote for persons who they may regard as being totally unacceptable to fill the offices for which they present themselves.

...

That choice in my view does permit them to say in effect "A plague on all their houses".

Van Moorst and Langer sought a declaration that (1) electors were entitled to deliberately vote informally and (2) electors were entitled to make a Langer vote. They also sought orders requiring the Australian Electoral Commission to publicise these declarations. Murray J declined to make either of the declarations, holding they merely sought to repeat the effect of the judgement of Vincent J and that they had no standing to seek an order requiring the Australian Electoral Commission to publish them.

== The extent of Langer votes and the legislative response ==
The campaign was not effective in 1987, with just 2,082 exhausted votes being recorded. For the 1990 election however this jumped to 18,765 exhausted votes. Following the 1990 election the Joint Standing Committee on Electoral matters recommended that it be made an offence to encourage others to vote other than in accordance with full preferential voting. The Electoral Act was again amended to include s 329A which provided as follows:

329A. (1) A person must not, during the relevant period in relation to a House of Representatives election under this Act, print, publish or distribute, or cause, permit or authorise to be printed, published or distributed, any matter or thing with the intention of encouraging persons voting at the election to fill in a ballot paper otherwise than in accordance with section 240. Penalty: Imprisonment for 6 months.

The purpose of s 270 was said to be that voters "do not have their votes discarded because of an unintentional mistake", but that s 329A was necessary to ensure that "people do not go out and intentionally frustrate the will of this Parliament by advocating an optional preferential system".

For the 1993 election the number of exhausted votes dropped back to 7,325.

== Langer's challenge ==
Langer v Commonwealth
- Court: High Court of Australia
- Full case name: Langer v Commonwealth of Australia, the Australian Electoral Commission & Cox
- Decided: 2 & 20 February 1996
- Citations: [1996] HCA 43, (1996) 186 CLR 302
- Transcript: [1995] HCATrans 338 (4 October 1995)

Court membership
- Judges sitting: Brennan CJ, Dawson, Toohey, Gaudron, McHugh and Gummow JJ

Case opinions
- 5:1 S329A was a valid law of the Commonwealth

In the week before the 1993 election Langer sought a declaration from the High Court that s 329A was not a valid act of the Commonwealth. On 11 March 1993 Deane J refused to make the declaration sought and referred the matter for consideration by the Full Court. The matter was not heard until 4 October 1995, and the order was handed down on 7 February 1996, one month prior to the 1996 election while the reasons for judgement were not handed down until 20 February 1996.

=== Arguments ===
Langer represented himself, and argued that:
-(1) the wording of section 240 did not require consecutive numbers without repeats; -(2) the Langer vote was a valid method of voting;
-(3) this impacted on free and fair elections in that it was an attempt to prevent discussion of a method of casting a valid vote;
-(4) the AEC was intimidating and misleading people about how they could vote. The Commonwealth was represented by the Solicitor-General, Gavan Griffith QC, and argued that s 240 required full preferential voting and that s 270 was a savings provision that was intended to apply to unintentional errors. S329A was necessary to protect the integrity of compulsory preferential voting.

=== Judgement ===
All of the Court held that a Langer vote was a valid vote under the then electoral laws. The majority, Brennan CJ, Toohey, Gaudron, McHugh and Gummow JJ, upheld the validity of s329A.

Brennan CJ "What the Constitution requires is that the law prescribe a method of voting which leaves the voter free to make a choice, not that the law leave the voter free to choose the method of voting by which a voter's choice is to be made. A method which requires full preferential voting satisfies the constitutional requirement." Similarly Toohey and Gaudron JJ held that s 328A assisted in the maintenance of a system of full preferential voting and was confined to conduct that was intended to encourage non-compliance with s 240 and was not concerned with conduct that was intended only to inform. Each of McHugh J, and Gummow J, held that the purpose of s 329A was to prevent the full preference system of voting from being undermined.

Dawson J dissented on the basis that the constitutional power of the Parliament to make laws about elections for the House of Representatives arose from sections 31 and 51(xxxvi) of the Constitution, which meant the law needed to be for the purpose of electing members of parliament, who must be "directly chosen by the people. The purpose of s 329A was not incidental to the election of representatives but rather to prevent the dissemination of information about how a person could cast a vote in a particular - and permissible - form.

== The prosecution of Langer ==
Langer v Australian Electoral Commission
- Court: Federal Court of Australia
- Citations: [1996] FCA 1277 & [No 2] [1996] FCA 1295

Case history
- Prior actions: Australian Electoral Commission v Langer [1996] VicRP 42 [1996] 1 VR 576; Commonwealth Electoral Commission v Langer [1996] VSC 6

Court membership
- Judges sitting: Black CJ, Lockhart & Beaumont JJ

The High Court upheld the validity of s329A on Friday 2 February 1996. On Monday 5 February 1996 the Australian Electoral Commission commenced proceedings in the Supreme Court of Victoria, seeking an order to prevent Langer from breaching s329A. This was not a prosecution for a breach of s329A, but instead it was an order to prevent a breach under s383. Beach J found that Langer had published material with the intention of encouraging people to fill in their ballot papers otherwise than in accordance with s240 of the Electoral Act and granted an order to prevent him from continuing to do so.

Langer made it clear to the Court that he did not intend to comply with the order and immediately proceeded outside the court where he distributed leaflets contrary to the Court order. On 14 February 1996, Beach J found that Langer was in contempt of court and would continue to breach the order unless he was prevented from doing so. Beach J sentenced Langer to be imprisoned until 30 April 1996.

=== Federal Court Appeals ===
Langer appealed to the Federal Court challenging the order of the Supreme Court. Langer argued that s240 did not require elector write numbers consecutively and he was therefore not advocating a breach of s240. A Full Court of the Federal Court, Black CJ, Lockhart & Beaumont JJ dismissed his appeal against the order.

Langer also appealed against his conviction for contempt and the appeal was heard by the same full court. Langer submitted that

...it would be very desirable for you to let me go at once. I have achieved my objectives. There is no further useful purpose that you can serve on my behalf by continuing to make a complete mockery of the judicial system and the electoral system in this country, and I have better things to do."

The Electoral Commission submitted that its interests were not served by the imprisonment of Langer after the date of the election on 2 March 1996.

Black CJ, Lockhart & Beaumont JJ held that the finding that Langer intended to breach the order was fully justified and upheld his conviction for contempt. The Court held however that the term of imprisonment was too long and ordered his release on 7 March 1996.

== Subsequent events ==
The number of exhausted votes in the 1996 election increased spectacularly from 7,325 in 1993 to 48,979. Amnesty International described Langer as Australia's first prisoner of conscience for over 20 years, alleging that his imprisonment was a breach of the Universal Declaration of Human Rights and the International Covenant on Civil and Political Rights. During the campaign John Howard described s329A as stupid.

In 1998 section 329A was repealed and the Parliament attempted to make the Langer voting method invalid by amendments to the Electoral Act. A Langer vote is now classed as an informal or invalid vote.

The treatment of ‘Langer-style’ votes changed in 1998. Langer-style ballots are typically numbered so that, at a point chosen by the elector, the preferences stop or begin to repeat (for example, 1, 2, 3, 3, 3. . .). Before 1998, such ballots were counted up to the point that the numbering stopped or became non-consecutive, and were then classified as exhausted. Until 1993, the number of Langer-style votes was small, but in 1996 there was a considerable increase. It is possible this was due to the well-publicised court action against Albert Langer. Since legislative change in 1998, Langer-style votes have been counted as informal, and their number has declined considerably.

It was not until 2016 that the Parliament permitted optional preferential voting for the Senate. Full preferential voting is still required for the House of Representatives.

== See also ==
- Optional Preferential Voting
