= Optional preferential voting =

Type of preferential voting system

Example of an optional preferential ballot paper

One of the ways in which ranked voting systems vary is whether an individual vote must express a minimum number of preferences to avoid being considered invalid ("spoiled" or "informal" or "rejected").

Possibilities are:

- Full preferential voting (FPV) requires all candidates to be ranked
- Optional preferential voting (OPV) requires only one candidate, the voter's first preference, to be indicated
- Semi-optional preferential voting requires ranking more than one candidate but not necessary to rank all the candidates.

In the latter two cases, the voter may mark additional preferences if desired.

Ranked-voting systems typically use a ballot paper in which the voter is required to write numbers 1, 2, 3, etc. opposite the name of the candidate who is their first, second, third, etc. preference.

In OPV and semi-optional systems, candidates not explicitly ranked by the voter are implicitly ranked lower than all numbered candidates. But under STV a vote will never go to a candidate for whom there is no marked preference on the ballot. Thus OPV and the semi-optional variant offers that assurance to the voter.

Some OPV jurisdictions permit a ballot expressing a single preference to use some other mark than the digit '1', such as a cross or tick-mark, opposite the preferred candidate's name, on the basis that the voter's intention is clear; other do not, arguing for example that an 'X' might be an expression of dislike.

FPV may not be possible if write-in candidates are allowed.

Under single transferable vote (STV), a ballot is initially allocated to the first-preference candidate but if the candidate marked as the first preference is elected or found to be un-electable, the vote may be transferred one or more times to successively lower preferences. If there is no lower preference available when such a transfer is applicable, the ballot is said to be exhausted.

FPV prevents exhausted ballots. On the other hand, FPV increases the risk of invalid ballots: the more numbers a voter is required to mark, the greater the opportunity for mistakes, by repeating or skipping numbers or skipping candidates, or purposeful spoilage by the voter (such as endorsed by Albert Langer).

Ranked vote systems vary in that some cast aside, at the start of the vote count, a ballot not correctly filled out, while other systems allow a ballot, even if not fully and correctly marked, to be used until the first mistake annuls the ballot. That was the case in federal Australian elections prior to 1998 (a Langer vote). But after 1998, Australia classified those votes as informal (invalid) from the start. Australia now allows ballots to express less than complete preferences (optional preferential voting) for Senate elections. Full preferential voting is still used in the instant-runoff voting system used to elect members of Australia's House of Representatives.

== Australia ==
The terms OPV and FPV are used mainly in Australia, in relation to elections at state and territory and Commonwealth (federal) level, which use proportional representation (Single transferable voting/STV) or preferential voting (IRV).

OPV is used in elections in the Australian state of New South Wales. It was used in Queensland's system of instant-runoff voting from 1992 to 2015, when it was replaced by full-preferential voting.

OPV was adopted in the Northern Territory in 2016.

In both the Tasmanian House of Assembly and the Tasmanian Legislative Council, semi-optional voting is used, with a minimum number of preferences required to be expressed. There is no requirement to complete the entire ballot paper (rank all the candidates).

Elections for all other Australian lower houses use full-preferential voting.

In the STV election of the New South Wales Legislative Council, semi-optional preferential voting has been used since 1978, with a minimum 10 preferences required for 15 seats before 1991, and 15 preferences for 21 seats since. Voters also have the option since 1984 of voting "above the line".

In the Victorian Legislative Council, semi-optional preferential voting is used if a voter chooses to vote below the line. Voting above the line requires only a '1' being placed in one box, and group voting tickets voting has applied since 1988.

Around 1999 Melbourne's Albert Langer engaged in a campaign to assist voters to mark fewer than all the candidates but still have their vote not deemed informal and rejected. This was a way to use the vote as if under the optional preferential voting system.

The Australian Senate voting reform of 2016 switched from full preferential voting to optional preferential voting. A minimum number is specified in the instructions on the ballot paper. Since in the past a single number '1' above the line was valid, that is still a formal vote even though voters are encouraged to rank six candidates.

== Elsewhere ==
STV Elections in Malta, in the Republic of Ireland, and in Northern Ireland use OPV. The ranked-choice voting system used in Maine, United States, Instant-runoff voting, can be considered optional-preferential as voters are allowed to rank just one candidate. The system also allows voters to skip one ranking (e.g. marking a first choice and a third choice, but not a second choice). In that case, the next ranking would be advanced to the next highest ranking, but more than one skip exhausts the ballot.
