= Albert Langer =

Australian political activist

Albert Langer (also known as Arthur Dent) is an Australian political activist, best known for his 1996 conviction and jailing on contempt charges after breaching an injunction forbidding his advocacy of marking electoral ballot papers in a way discouraged by the Australian Electoral Commission. As a result of his imprisonment, Amnesty International declared him the first Australian prisoner of conscience for over 20 years.

== Life and early activism ==
Langer was educated at Monash University, where he studied mathematics and became a prominent student activist during the Vietnam War years. He was a leader of the Maoist Monash Labor Club at the university, and supported the Communist Party of Australia (Marxist-Leninist). He was also associated with a movement which argued that software should be free of copyright laws. Langer is an active opponent of Zionism and was a member of Jews Against Zionism and Anti-Semitism (JAZA). He was the leader of the Maoist Red Eureka Movement.

== Conviction ==
=== Advocacy of assigning equal last preferences ===
In 1986 Albert Langer wrote a conference paper entitled Don't Vote, examining possible electoral strategy for the left, aiming to bring down the Australian Labor Party (ALP) government and to target their candidates in marginal seats. In 1987 and 1990 there were instances where Victorian voters were urged to take advantage of section 270 of the Commonwealth Electoral Act and give less preferred parties equal last preferences (now known as a Langer vote), so as not to express a choice for either major party.

=== Introduction of section 329A and challenge to constitutionality ===
To counter such tactics and advocacy of voting informally, the ALP government formulated section 329A of the Electoral Act. It was enacted in December 1992, making it an offence to encourage voters to fill in House of Representatives ballot papers in a non-officially prescribed manner.

329A. (1) A person must not, during the relevant period in relation to a House of Representatives election under this Act, print, publish or distribute, or cause, permit or authorise to be printed, published or distributed, any matter or thing with the intention of encouraging persons voting at the election to fill in a ballot paper otherwise than in accordance with section 240. Penalty: Imprisonment for 6 months.
(2) In this section: "publish" includes publish by radio or television.
– Section 329A of the Commonwealth Electoral Act (repealed)

This legislation was later repealed, but not before being tested by Langer.

On 5 March 1993, ahead of the 1993 election, Albert Langer received warnings from the Australian Electoral Commission not to run the campaign he had initiated. He sought relief from the High Court to stop the AEC from intimidating him, and to determine the validity of section 329A. The matter was reviewed by Justice William Deane (who shortly afterwards became Governor General). Deane dismissed his injunction application, but referred the question to the full bench. The case was joined with a similar challenge by Patrick Muldowney to South Australian electoral matters to determine the validity of section 126. The matters were heard in Canberra in October 1995.

The decision was not publicly announced until 7 February 1996 – just after the writs for the 1996 election were issued on 28 January. With only Dawson dissenting, the Court rejected Langer's argument that section 329A was unconstitutional. The decision confirmed the Act required votes to be cast with a sequence of consecutive and unrepeated numbers.

On 31 January 1996 the Neither! campaign published a newspaper advertisement to which the AEC objected and took action against. The matter was adjourned pending the High Court decision and, on 8 February the AEC obtained an injunction from Justice Beach of the Victorian Supreme Court to restrain Albert Langer from publishing the advertisement "How to vote for Neither!"

Langer was never prosecuted under section 329A. The Electoral Commission chose not to use the provision but rather sought the measure of injunctive relief.

=== Contempt charges ===
Langer informed the media of the decision outside the courthouse and provided them with a copy of the Neither! leaflet. A few days later he was summoned to appear on the charge of contempt for distributing the leaflet, with those same members of the media appearing as witnesses. Consequently, he was sentenced to 10 weeks imprisonment for breaching the court injunction ordering him to stop advocating contrary to the Electoral Act. In March 1996, after widespread public outcry and media attention, the Federal Court reduced his sentence to three weeks, which he had already served in full.

During his incarceration, Albert Langer was deemed by Amnesty International to be a "Prisoner of Conscience."

=== Repeal of section 329A ===
The June 1997 report into the 1996 election by Parliament's Joint Standing Committee on Electoral Matters discussed the Langer case and recommended the repeal of section 329A. Section 329A was repealed by the Electoral and Referendum Amendment Act 1998, which became law on 17 July 1998. Section 240 was amended by the same Act to specify that using repeated numbers invalidated a vote.
