= Instant-runoff voting =

Single-winner ranked-choice electoral system

Instant-runoff voting (IRV; US/CA: ranked-choice voting (RCV), AU: preferential voting, UK/NZ: alternative vote) is a single-winner ranked voting election system where one or more eliminations are used to simulate multiple runoff elections. In each round, the candidate with the fewest first-preference votes among the remaining candidates is eliminated. This continues until only one candidate is left. Instant runoff falls under the plurality-with-elimination family of voting methods, and is thus closely related to methods like the two-round system and party primary.

Instant-runoff voting is used in the national elections of several countries, especially countries which were formerly part of the British Empire. It is used to elect members of the Australian House of Representatives and the National Parliament of Papua New Guinea, and to elect the head of state in India, Ireland, and Sri Lanka. In the United States, it is used in Maine and Alaska following approval by referendum respectively in 2016 and 2020.

The system was first discussed by the Marquis de Condorcet, who showed the rule could eliminate the majority-preferred candidate (Condorcet winner). Other critics of instant-runoff voting have pointed to further mathematical pathologies, including the ability of certain implementations to have the potential to eliminate candidates for having too much support or too many votes. Like first-past-the-post voting (FPTP), instant-runoff is vulnerable to a kind of spoiler effect called a center squeeze, which causes it to favor uncompromising alternatives over more-moderate ones, encouraging polarization.

Advocates of instant-runoff voting often argue these properties are positive, as winner-take-all methods can leave a large portion of the electorate without representation. For example, in a race that tabulates votes using a simple majority, if a candidate wins with only 40% of the vote, this means that the majority (60%) of the electorate did not vote for the winning candidate. In countries without primaries or runoffs, like the United Kingdom, instant-runoff voting is seen as preventing spoiler effects by eliminating minor-party candidates because it avoids some kinds of vote-splitting by nearly identical (clone) candidates. IRV has also been described as a natural extension of the two-round system or primary elections that avoids multiple rounds of voting. Some advocates also argue that voting methods should encourage candidates to appeal to their core support or political base rather than a broad coalition.

== Election procedure ==
Flowchart of instant-runoff voting

In instant-runoff voting, as with other ranked voting rules, each voter orders candidates from first to last. The counting procedure is then as follows:

1. If there is a candidate that has a majority of the top preferences of the valid, active ballots, then that candidate is elected and the count stops.
2. If no candidate has this majority, the candidate with the fewest votes is eliminated and their votes transferred to the next usable marked preference, if any. (Note: This procedure can be sped up by eliminating more than one candidate if their combined top preferences are less than the next-lowest remaining candidate; this process is sometimes called batch elimination. When batch elimination is used, the procedure can terminate if some candidate has a majority.)
3. The elimination process continues until a candidate has a majority in the subsequent rounds or is the only candidate left.

It is possible for a candidate to win an instant-runoff race with support from less than half of the voters who cast votes. This occurs when some voters do not rank all the candidates on their ballots, leading to exhausted votes. The winning candidate thus has a majority of the remaining votes but not of all first-choice votes.

In practice, the candidate who leads the first round usually finishes with a majority or enough to win the seat: the IRV winner is often the same as the first-past-the-post winner.

== Properties and pathologies ==
=== Center squeeze ===
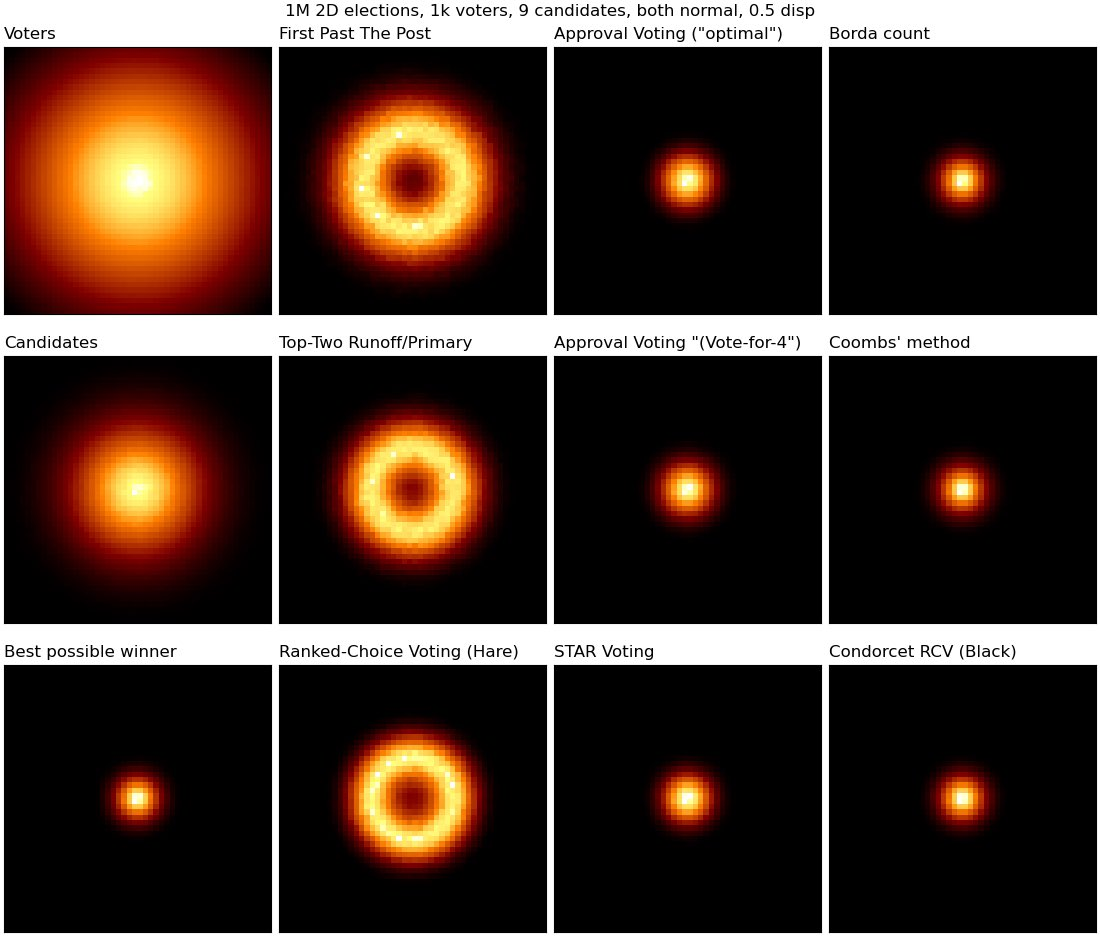
Distribution of winners on a simulated political compass, showing how center-squeeze extends to more complex or multi-dimensional models. The number of winners is displayed as a heatmap. The bias of FPTP, runoffs or primaries, and RCV (center-left column) is clearly visible.

A center squeeze is a kind of spoiler effect shared by rules like the two-round system, plurality-with-primaries, and ranked choice voting. In a center squeeze, the majority-preferred and socially optimal candidate is eliminated in favor of a more extreme alternative in an early round, while there are still spoilers. Systems with center squeeze are sometimes called centrifugal ("center-fleeing") because they encourage political polarization.

Candidates focused on appealing to a smaller base of core supporters can "squeeze" broadly popular candidates trapped between them out of the race, by splitting the first-preference votes needed to survive earlier rounds. This effect was first predicted by social choice theorists in the 1940s and 50s, and has since been documented in various countries using plurality-style electoral systems.

Famous examples of center squeezes include Alaska's 2022 special election (where Nick Begich III was eliminated in the first round by Sarah Palin), as well as the 2007 French presidential election, where moderate liberal François Bayrou was eliminated by left-wing Ségolène Royal, allowing the right-wing Nicolas Sarkozy to win the second round.

=== Wasted votes and Condorcet winners ===
Compared to a plurality voting system that rewards only the top vote-getter using non-transferable votes, instant-runoff voting mitigates the problem of wasted votes. However, it does not ensure the election of a Condorcet winner, which is the candidate who would win a direct election against any other candidate in the race.

Some advocates of instant-runoff voting argue that the failure to elect a Condorcet winner is positive, as it enables instant-runoff voting to pass later-no-help and later-no-harm, which together render the method immune to burying strategy. FairVote, in particular, has stated that they "believe [later-no-harm] is necessary in the context of high-stakes, competitive elections".

=== Resistance to strategy ===
Instant-runoff voting has notably high resistance to tactical voting but less to strategic nomination.

==== Party strategizing and strategic nomination ====
In Australia, preference deals (where one party's voters agree to place another party's voters second, in return for their doing the same) between parties are common. Parties and candidates often encourage their supporters to participate in these preference deals using how-to-vote cards explaining how to use their lower rankings to maximize the chances of their ballot helping to elect someone in the preference deal before it may exhaust.

Instant runoff may be manipulable via strategic candidate entry and exit, reducing similar candidates' chances of winning. Such manipulation does not need to be intentional, instead acting to deter candidates from running in the first place. Spatial model simulations indicate that instant runoff rewards strategic withdrawal by candidates. (Note: Figure 4 on page 137 shows instant-runoff voting having exit incentive despite being clone independent.)

==== Tactical voting ====
Gibbard's theorem demonstrates that no (deterministic, non-dictatorial) voting method can be entirely immune from tactical voting. This implies that instant-runoff voting is susceptible to tactical voting in some circumstances. In particular, when there exists a Condorcet winner who instant-runoff voting fails to elect, voters who prefer the Condorcet winner to the instant-runoff voting winner have an incentive to use the compromising strategy. instant-runoff voting is also sometimes vulnerable to a paradoxical strategy of ranking a candidate higher to make them lose, due to instant-runoff voting failing the monotonicity criterion.

Research suggests that instant-runoff voting is highly resistant to strategic voting. In a test of multiple methods, instant runoff was found to be the second-most-resistant to tactical voting, after a class of instant runoff-Condorcet hybrids. Instant-runoff voting is also completely immune to the burying strategy: ranking a strong opposition candidate lower can't get one's preferred candidate elected.

Tactical voting in instant-runoff voting seeks to alter the order of eliminations in early rounds, to ensure that the original winner is challenged by a stronger opponent in the final round. For example, in a three-party election where voters for both the left and right prefer the centrist candidate to stop the opposing candidate from winning, those voters who care more about defeating the opposition than electing their own candidate may cast a tactical first-preference vote for the centrist candidate.

=== Spoiler effect ===
Proponents of instant-runoff voting claim that instant-runoff voting eliminates the spoiler effect, since instant-runoff voting makes it safe to vote honestly for marginal parties. Under a plurality method, voters who sympathize most strongly with a marginal candidate are strongly encouraged to instead vote for a more popular candidate who shares some of the same principles, since that candidate has a much greater chance of being elected, and a vote for the marginal candidate will not result in the marginal candidate's election. Instant-runoff voting reduces this problem, since the voter can rank the marginal candidate first and the mainstream candidate second; in the likely event that the fringe candidate is eliminated, the vote is not wasted but is transferred to the second preference.

However, when the third-party candidate is more competitive, they can still act as a spoiler under instant-runoff voting by taking away first-choice votes from the more mainstream candidate until that candidate is eliminated; then that candidate's second-choice votes help a more-disliked candidate to win. In these scenarios, it would have been better for the third party voters if their candidate had not run at all (spoiler effect), or if they had voted dishonestly, ranking their second-favorite first and their favorite second, rather than first (favorite betrayal). This is the same bracketing effect exploited by Robinette and Tideman in their research on strategic campaigning, where a candidate alters their campaign to cause a change in voter honest choice, resulting in the elimination of a candidate who nevertheless remains more preferred by voters. This occurred in the 2022 Alaska's at-large congressional district special election. If Republican Sarah Palin, who lost in the end, had not run, the more centrist Republican candidate, Nick Begich, would have defeated the winning Democratic candidate, Mary Peltola, because the ballot data shows that the votes for the two Republican candidates would have been combined behind Begich and would have exceeded those of Peltola. This did not happen in the IRV election due to the way 15,000 Begich supporters marked their back-up preferences across party lines.

This may be observed when a candidate leads in the first count but is in the end unsuccessful. For example, in the 2009 Burlington, Vermont, mayoral election, if Kurt Wright, the Republican candidate who lost in the end, had not run, the Democratic candidate, Andy Montroll, would have defeated the winning Progressive candidate, Bob Kiss. In that sense, the Republican candidate was a spoiler—albeit for an opposing Democrat, rather than some political ally—even though he led in first-choice support.

=== Failed criteria ===
==== Condorcet winner criterion ====
The Condorcet winner criterion states that "if a candidate would win a head-to-head competition against every other candidate, then that candidate must win the overall election". It is incompatible with the later-no-harm criterion, so instant-runoff voting does not meet this criterion.

Instant-runoff voting is more likely to elect the Condorcet winner than plurality voting and traditional runoff elections. The California cities of Oakland, San Francisco and San Leandro in 2010 provide an example; there were a total of four elections in which the plurality-voting leader in first-choice rankings was defeated, and in each case the instant-runoff voting winner was the Condorcet winner, including a San Francisco election in which the instant-runoff voting winner was in third place in first choice rankings.

Two notable Condorcet failures occurred with the 2009 Burlington mayoral election and the 2022 Alaska's at-large congressional district special election.

==== Independence of irrelevant alternatives ====
The independence of irrelevant alternatives criterion states that "the election outcome remains the same even if a candidate who cannot win decides to run." Instant-runoff voting violates this. In the general case, instant-runoff voting can be susceptible to strategic nomination: whether or not a candidate decides to run at all can affect the result even if the new candidate cannot themselves win. This is less likely to happen than under plurality, but much more likely than under the Minimax Condorcet method.

==== Monotonicity criterion ====
The monotonicity criterion says that a voter ranking a candidate higher on their ballot should not cause that candidate to lose and conversely, that a voter ranking a candidate lower on their ballot should not help that candidate win. The exact probability of a monotonicity failure depends on the circumstances, but with 3 major candidates, the probabilities range from 15 percent under the impartial culture model to 8.5 percent in the case of a strict left–right spectrum.

==== Participation criterion ====
The participation criterion says that candidates should not lose as a result of having "too many voters"—a set of ballots that all rank A>B should not switch the election winner from A to B. Instant-runoff voting fails this criterion. In his 1984 study, mathematician Depankar Ray found that in elections where instant-runoff voting elects a different candidate from plurality, that there was an estimated 50 percent probability that some voters would have received a more preferable outcome if they had not participated.

==== Reversal symmetry criterion ====
The reversal symmetry criterion states that the first- and last-place candidates should switch places if every ballot is reversed. In other words, it should not matter whether voters rank candidates from best-to-worst and select the best candidate, or whether they rank them worst-to-best and then select the least-bad candidate.

Instant-runoff voting fails this criterion: it is possible to construct an election where reversing the order of every ballot does not alter the final winner; that is, the first- and last-place finishers, according to instant-runoff voting, are the same candidate.

== Criticism ==
The system has had a mixed reception among political scientists and social choice theorists. Some have suggested that the system does not do much to decrease the impact of wasted votes relative to plurality. Research has found instant-runoff voting causes lower confidence in elections and does not substantially affect minority representation, voter turnout, or long-run electoral competition. Opponents have also noted a high rate of repeals for the system.

=== Similarity to plurality ===
Often instant-runoff voting elections are won by the candidate who leads in first-count vote tallies so they choose the same winner as first-past-the-post voting would have. Such similarity between the two systems means the disproportionality of IRV is about same as results under first-past-the-post.

Of the Australia federal elections, the 1972 election had the largest number of winners who would not have won under first-past-the-post, but still only 14 out of 125 seats filled were not won by the first-count leader. In the Australian federal election in September 2013, 135 out of the 150 House of Representatives seats (or 90 percent) were won by the candidate who led on first preferences. The other 15 seats (10 percent) were won by the candidate who placed second on first preferences.

=== Participation ===
The effect of instant-runoff voting on voter turnout is difficult to assess. In a 2021 report, researchers at New America, a think tank based in Washington, D.C., said it may increase turnout by attracting more and more diverse candidates, but the impact would be realized most significantly by eliminating the need for primaries. The overall impact on diversity of candidates is difficult to detect.

=== Invalid, incomplete and exhausted ballots ===
All forms of ranked-choice voting reduce to plurality when all ballots rank only one candidate. By extension, ballots for which all candidates ranked are eliminated are equivalent to votes for any non-winner in plurality, and considered exhausted ballots.

Some political scientists have found the IRV system contributes to higher rates of spoiled votes, partly because the ballot marking is more complex. Most jurisdictions with instant-runoff voting do not require complete rankings and may use columns to indicate preference instead of numbers. In American elections with instant-runoff voting, more than 99 percent of voters typically cast a valid ballot.

A 2015 study of four local US elections that used instant-runoff voting found that inactive ballots occurred often enough in each of them that the winner of each election did not receive a majority of votes cast in the first round. The rate of inactive ballots in each election ranged from a low of 9.6 percent to a high of 27.1 percent.

== Terminology ==
Instant-runoff voting derives its name from the way the ballot count simulates a series of runoffs, similar to an exhaustive ballot system, except that voters do not need to turn out several times to vote. It is also known as the alternative vote, transferable vote, ranked-choice voting (RCV), single-seat ranked-choice voting, or preferential voting. Academic sources occasionally refer to it as Hare's method, after Thomas Hare, to differentiate it from other methods of ranked-choice voting.

FairVote, a non-governmental organization in the United States which advocates for electoral reform, uses the term "ranked-choice voting" to refer to instant-runoff voting. This choice has been criticized as an attempt to obscure the existence of other methods of ranked-choice voting which could compete with instant-runoff voting. Some jurisdictions in the United States which use instant-runoff voting in their elections – such as San Francisco, Minneapolis, Maine, and Alaska – have used the term "ranked-choice voting" in their laws that apply to instant-runoff voting contests. The San Francisco Department of Elections has claimed the word instant in the term instant-runoff voting could confuse voters into expecting results to be immediately available. The term ranked-choice voting has also been used in Canada, possibly as a result of American influence. Former prime minister of Canada Justin Trudeau used the term preferential ballot when discussing his party's plans for election reform.

In Ireland, where instant-runoff voting is used to elect the President and the Ceann Comhairle, the Constitution of Ireland refers to it as "proportional representation by means of the single transferable vote." Single transferable vote is a variant of instant-runoff voting where multiple winning candidates are selected from each electoral district, used in Ireland to elect members of the European Parliament, the Dáil Éireann, and local government. It is considered distinct from instant-runoff voting, but Irish law does not distinguish between the two methods.

In the United Kingdom and New Zealand instant-runoff voting is sometimes referred to as the "Alternative Vote" or AV system.

State law in South Carolina and Arkansas use "instant runoff" to describe the practice of having certain categories of absentee voters cast ranked-choice ballots before the first round of an election and counting those ballots in any subsequent runoff elections.

== History and use ==
=== History ===
According to mathematician Edward J. Nanson, the method was first described by the Marquis de Condorcet in 1788, "but only to be condemned". It was later independently reinvented by Thomas Hare (of England) and Carl Andrae (of Denmark) in the form of the single transferable vote, while Henry Richmond Droop and William R. Ware were the first to apply it to single-winner races.

==== Adoption ====
Instant-runoff voting has seen limited adoption in national elections, primarily in countries which were formerly part of the British Empire. Members of the Australian House of Representatives and the National Parliament of Papua New Guinea are elected using instant-runoff voting, and it is also used to elect the head of state in India, Ireland, and Sri Lanka.

In Alaska, instant-runoff voting is used for general elections, after a top-four nonpartisan primary, while in Maine it is used for both general elections and for primary elections (held separately by each party), excluding those for president.

=== Robert's Rules of Order ===
In the United States, the sequential elimination method used by instant-runoff voting is described in Robert's Rules of Order Newly Revised as an example of ranked-choice voting that can be used to elect officers. Robert's Rules note that ranked-choice systems (including instant-runoff voting) are an improvement on simple plurality but recommend against runoff-based methods because they often prevent the emergence of a consensus candidate with broad support. The book instead recommends repeated balloting until some candidate manages to win a majority of votes. Two other books on American parliamentary procedure, The Standard Code of Parliamentary Procedure and Riddick's Rules of Procedure, take a similar stance.

== Examples ==
=== 1990 Irish presidential election ===
The 1990 Irish presidential election provides a simple example of how instant-runoff voting can produce a different result from first-preference plurality and prevent some kinds of vote-splitting. The three major candidates were Brian Lenihan of Fianna Fáil, Austin Currie of Fine Gael, and Mary Robinson of the Labour Party. In the first round, Lenihan had the largest share of first-choice rankings but not a majority. Currie had the fewest votes and was eliminated. After this, Robinson received 82 percent of Currie's votes. This was enough for her vote tally to pass that of Lenihan.

1990 Irish presidential election
Candidate	Round 1		Round 2	
Mary Robinson	612,265	38.7%	817,830	51.6%
Brian Lenihan	694,484	43.8%	731,273	46.2%
Austin Currie	267,902	16.9%	Eliminated	
Exhausted ballots	9,444	0.6%	34,992	2.2%
Total	1,584,095	100%	1,584,095	100%

=== 2014 Prahran election (Victoria) ===
Another real-life example of instant-runoff voting producing results different from first-past-the-post can be seen in the 2014 Victorian general election in Prahran. In this rare instance, the candidate who initially placed third, Greens candidate Sam Hibbins, won the seat. In the 7th and final round, Hibbins narrowly defeated Liberal candidate Clem Newton-Brown by a margin of 277 votes, having eliminated Neil Pharaoh by the even narrower margin of 31 votes in the previous round.

Candidate	1st		2nd	3rd	4th	5th	6th	7th	
Clem Newton-Brown (LIB)	44.8%	16,582	16,592	16,644	16,726	16,843	17,076	18,363	49.6%
Neil Pharaoh (ALP)	25.9%	9,586	9,593	9,639	9,690	9,758	9,948	Eliminated	
Sam Hibbins (GRN)	24.8%	9,160	9,171	9,218	9,310	9,403	9,979	18,640	50.4%
Eleonora Gullone (AJP)	2.3%	837	860	891	928	999	Eliminated		
Alan Walker (FFP)	0.8%	282	283	295	Eliminated				
Jason Goldsmith (IND)	0.7%	247	263	316	349	Eliminated			
Steve Stefanopoulos (IND)	0.6%	227	241	Eliminated					
Alan Menadue (IND)	0.2%	82	Eliminated						
Total	100%	37,003							

=== 2009 Burlington mayoral election ===
2009 Burlington mayoral election (round-by-round analysis of votes)
Candidates		1st round		2nd round		3rd round	
Candidate	Party	Votes	±	Votes	±	Votes	±
Bob Kiss	Progressive	2585	+2585	2981	+396	4313	+1332
Kurt Wright	Republican	2951	+2951	3294	+343	4061	+767
Andy Montroll	Democrat	2063	+2063	2554	+491	Eliminated	
Dan Smith	Independent	1306	+1306	Eliminated			
Others		71	+71	Eliminated			
Exhausted		4	+4	151	+147	606	+455

Burlington, Vermont's second IRV election in 2009 resulted in Bob Kiss defeating the majority-preferred candidate, Andy Montroll. Although 54 percent of voters ranked Montroll above Kiss, Montroll was defeated as a result of a first-round spoiler effect, violating the principle of majority rule.

FairVote touted the 2009 election as one of its major success stories, claiming it helped the city save on costs of a traditional runoff and prevented a spoiler effect, although later analysis showed that without Wright in the election, Montroll would have defeated Kiss in a one-on-one race.

Mathematicians and voting theorists criticized the election results as revealing several pathologies associated with instant-runoff voting, noting Kiss only won because of 750 votes cast against his candidacy (ranking Kiss in last place).

== Similar methods ==
=== Runoff voting ===
The term instant-runoff voting is derived from the name of a class of voting methods called runoff voting. In runoff voting voters do not rank candidates on the ballot - each voter marks only one preference. When no candidate receives a majority of voters in the first round, voters cast votes in two or more subsequent rounds of voting as the field of candidates is reduced. Multi-round runoff voting methods allow voters to change their preferences in each round, incorporating the results of the prior round to influence their decision, which is not possible in instant-runoff voting.

The runoff method closest to instant-runoff voting is the exhaustive ballot. In this method—familiar to fans of the television show American Idol—one candidate is eliminated in each round, and many rounds of voting may be necessary. Because holding many rounds of voting on separate days is generally expensive, the exhaustive ballot is not used for large-scale, public elections.

A more practical form of runoff voting is the two-round system. If no candidate receives a majority of votes in the first round, all but the top-two candidates are excluded after the first round, and just one more round of voting determines the winner. Eliminations can occur with or without allowing and applying preference votes to choose the final two candidates. This method is used in Mali and France, and in Finnish and Slovenian presidential elections.

=== Contingent vote ===
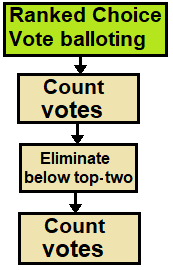
Top-two instant-runoff voting

The contingent vote, also known as "top-two instant-runoff voting" ("top-two IRV"), is the same as instant-runoff voting, except that if no candidate achieves a majority in the first round of counting, all but the two candidates with the most votes are eliminated, and the second preferences for those ballots are counted. As in instant-runoff voting, there is only one round of voting. Unlike instant-runoff voting, the vote count process entails only two rounds of counting, while instant-runoff voting can entail many rounds.

Under a variant of contingent voting used in Sri Lanka, and formerly for the elections for Mayor of London in the United Kingdom, voters rank a specified maximum number of candidates. In London, the supplementary vote allowed (Note: Following the Elections Act 2022, voting in mayoral elections now takes place under the first-past-the-post system.) voters to express first and second preferences only. Sri Lankan voters rank up to three candidates to elect the president of Sri Lanka.

While similar to "sequential-elimination" instant-runoff voting, top-two can produce different results. Excluding more than one candidate after the first count might eliminate a candidate who would have won under sequential elimination instant-runoff voting. Restricting voters to a maximum number of preferences is more likely to exhaust ballots if voters do not anticipate which candidates will finish in the top two. This can encourage voters to vote more tactically, by ranking at least one candidate they think is likely to win.

Conversely, a practical benefit of 'contingent voting' is expediency and confidence in the result with only two rounds.

=== Larger runoff process ===
Instant-runoff voting may also be part of a larger runoff process:

- Some jurisdictions that hold runoff elections allow absentee (only) voters to submit ranked ballots, because the interval between rounds of balloting is too short for a second round of absentee voting. Ranked ballots enable absentee votes to count in the second (general) election round if their first choice does not make the second round runoff. Arkansas, South Carolina and Springfield, Illinois adopt this approach. Louisiana uses it only for members of the United States Service or who reside overseas.
- Under some exhaustive ballot runoff systems, instant-runoff voting may be used to quickly eliminate some weak candidates in early rounds, using rules to leave a desired number of candidates for further balloting.
- Instant-runoff voting elections that require a majority of cast ballots but not that voters rank all candidates may require more than a single instant-runoff voting contest due to exhausted ballots. (Most IRV systems require a winner to have only a majority of votes still in play, not a majority of votes cast.)
- Robert's Rules recommends preferential voting for elections by mail and requiring a majority of votes to elect a winner. For in-person elections, they recommend repeated balloting until one candidate receives a majority of votes; if candidates drop out when it becomes clear they will not win, this procedure will always elect a Condorcet winner. The use of repeated balloting allows voters to resolve Condorcet cycles by discussion and compromise, or by electing a consensus candidate who might have polled poorly in the initial election.

=== Variations ===
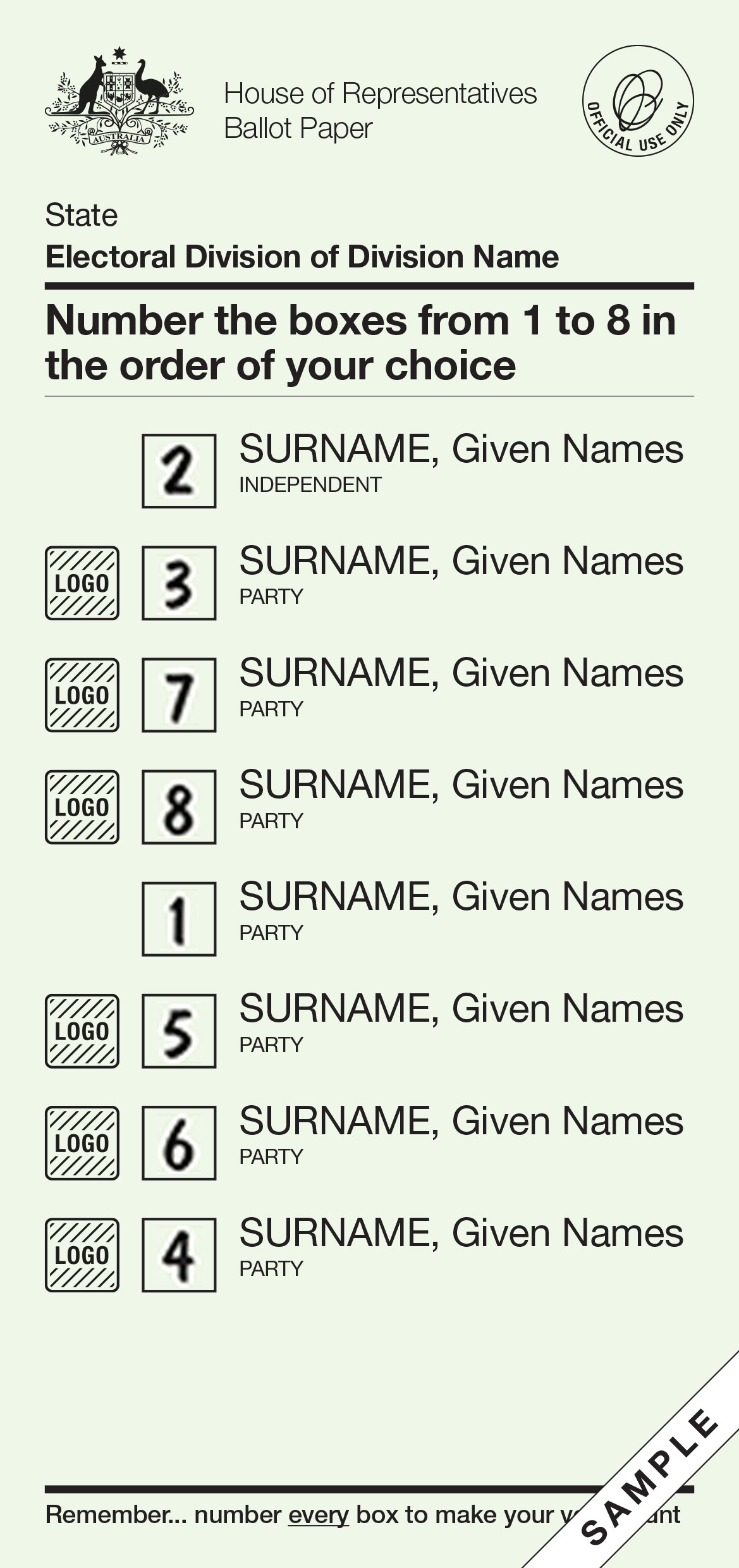
Example of a full preferential ballot paper

A number of instant-runoff voting methods, varying as to ballot design and as to whether or not voters are obliged to rank all the candidates, are in use in different countries and local governments.

In an optional preferential voting system, voters can give a preference to as many candidates as they wish. They may make only a single choice, known as "bullet voting", and some jurisdictions accept a single box marked with an "X" (as opposed to a numeral "1") as valid for the first preference. Bullet voting may result in exhausted ballots, where all of a voter's preferences are eliminated before a candidate is elected, such that the "majority" in the final round may constitute only a minority of all ballots cast. Optional preferential voting is used for elections for the President of Ireland as well as some elections in New South Wales and Queensland.

In a full-preferential voting method, voters are required to mark a preference for every candidate standing. Ballots that do not contain a ranking of all candidates are in some jurisdictions considered spoilt or invalid, even if there are only two candidates standing. The full-preferential voting method can become burdensome in elections with many candidates and can lead to "donkey voting", in which some voters order their preferred candidates and then fill in the remainder by simply choosing candidates at random or in top-to-bottom order. Full preferential voting, where the voter must mark a certain minimum number of preferences, is used for elections to the Australian House of Representatives and most Australian state parliaments.

Other methods only allow marking preferences for a maximum of the voter's top three favorites, a form of partial preferential voting. Such a restriction may cause a vote to become exhausted even when the voter was willing to rank more candidates.

A version of instant-runoff voting applying to the ranking of parties was first proposed for elections in Germany in 2013 as spare vote.

== See also ==
- Alternative vote plus (AV+), or alternative vote top-up, proposed by the Jenkins Commission in the UK
- Comparison of voting rules
- Duverger's law
- Two-party-preferred vote
- Write-in candidate
