= Ranked-choice voting in the United States =

Electoral system used in some cities and states

Ranked-choice voting in the US by state, as of March 2026 Some state-wide elections Local option for municipalities to opt-in Local elections in some jurisdictions Ranked choice voting banned state-wide

Ranked-choice voting (RCV) can refer to one of several ranked voting methods used in some cities and states in the United States. The term refers to the general category of voting systems where voters rank candidates. In the US, the specific system is most often instant-runoff voting (IRV) or single transferable vote (STV), the main difference between the two being whether only one winner or multiple winners are elected. At the federal and state level, instant-runoff voting is used for congressional and presidential elections in Maine; state, congressional, and presidential general elections in Alaska; and special congressional elections in Hawaii. Since 2025, it is also used for all elections in the District of Columbia.

Single transferable voting, only possible in multi-winner contests, is not currently used in state or congressional elections. It is used to elect city councillors in Portland, Oregon, Cambridge, Massachusetts, and several other cities.

As of April 2025, RCV is used for local elections in 47 US cities including Salt Lake City, Utah and Seattle, Washington. It has also been used by some state political parties in party-run primaries and nominating conventions. As a contingency in the case of a runoff election, ranked ballots are used by overseas voters in six states.

Since 2020, voters in seven states have rejected ballot initiatives that would have implemented, or allowed legislatures to implement, ranked-choice voting. As of March 2026, ranked-choice voting has also been banned in nineteen states. Complexity, cost, difficulty of voting, and issues of transparency have been cited as barriers to adoption.

== History ==
Most elections in the United States use the first past the post system, often with primary elections. Other systems that have been used entailed ranked votes. IRV, STV and Contingent vote (AKA supplementary voting) use secondary rankings on ranked votes as contingency votes; Nanson's method and Bucklin voting, which have also been used, consider secondary rankings as pertinent alongside first preferences.

The preferential voting system used in the primary elections of Wisconsin and Minnesota in the 1910s was a form of supplementary voting. Between 1912 and 1930, supplementary voting, typically with only two rankings allowed and only two rounds of voting, was implemented in some election systems used in the U.S. The reform was later repealed.

Proportional representation by means of the single transferable vote (PR-STV) was used in about 24 U.S. cities prior to 1940. PR-STV was first used in North America in Ashtabula, Ohio, in 1915. PR-STV was also used for the election of the nine-member city council of Cincinnati, Ohio, from 1924 to 1957, and in Cleveland, Ohio and Sacramento, California. New York City adopted STV in 1936 as a method for breaking the corrupt political machine of Tammany Hall dominating the city and used it for five elections from 1937 to 1945. Cambridge, Massachusetts started using proportional representation by means of the single transferable vote in 1941 for its city council and school committee elections, and have continued to use it.

Starting in the early 2000s, instant-runoff voting was adopted in the San Francisco Bay Area and throughout Minnesota. The city of Minneapolis, Minnesota adopted the use of PR-STV for its Board of Estimate and Taxation and a combination of instant-runoff voting for district elections and PR-STV for at-large elections of its Park and Recreation Board.

Instant-runoff voting was also adopted in the cities of Aspen, Colorado and Burlington, Vermont during the early 2000s. They were repealed within a decade of their adoption. Burlington re-adopted instant-runoff voting in 2021.

Both Portland, Maine and Portland, Oregon adopted STV around 2022. The Oregon city's implementation only applied to its new city council system, whose members are to be elected in three-seat wards, whereas Portland, Maine's implementation applies to all of the city's bodies where elected in multi-winner contests. (However in the 2024 election no members were elected in multi-member contests.)

The proposed Fair Representation Act would require multi-member districts for elections to the US House of Representatives which would then be elected by STV. States with only one representative would instead have elections by instant-runoff voting.

== Use of instant-runoff voting at state and federal levels ==
=== Maine, 2018–present ===
==== State and congressional elections ====
In 2018, Maine began using instant-runoff voting for primary and general elections for the U.S. Senate and U.S. House of Representatives, and for primary elections for governor and the state legislature. Maine was the first state to use instant-runoff voting for all these elections.

In 2016, Maine voters approved Maine Question 5 with 52% of the vote, approving instant-runoff voting for primary and general elections for governor, U.S. Senate, U.S. House and the state legislature, starting in 2018. However, in May 2017, the Maine Supreme Judicial Court stated that instant-runoff voting can be used only for federal offices and primary elections for state offices because the state constitution specifies that a plurality suffices to win general elections for state offices.

In October 2017, the state legislature voted to delay implementation of Question 5 until 2021, at which time the entire Question would be considered repealed unless a constitutional amendment had been passed permitting instant-runoff voting for general elections for state offices. Maine voters then collected enough signatures to put a Question on the June 2018 ballot to veto the October 2017 law. The people's veto, Question 1, passed in the June 2018 election. This election also initiated the use of instant-runoff voting for state and federal primaries because the presence of Question 1 on the ballot suspended the October 2017 law.

In the 2018 United States House of Representatives elections in Maine, though Republican incumbent Bruce Poliquin led by 2,171 votes in the first round of vote tabulation in the 2nd Congressional District, he did not have a majority of the votes, initiating the instant runoff tabulation process. Poliquin filed a lawsuit in federal court on November 13, seeking an order to halt the second-round tabulation of ballots and declare RCV unconstitutional, but his request for an injunction to halt the counting was denied. On November 15, the Maine Secretary of State announced Democratic candidate Jared Golden as the winner by 3,509 votes, after votes for independent candidates Tiffany Bond and Will Hoar were eliminated and ballots with these votes had their second- or third-choice votes counted.

Poliquin requested a recount of the ballots just before the deadline of November 26. On December 14, with almost half of the votes recounted and with the result not being significantly changed, Poliquin ended the recount after incurring $15,000 in fees. Poliquin continued his lawsuit and asked the judge, Lance Walker, to order a new election be held should he decline to hold instant-runoff voting unconstitutional. Judge Walker ruled against Poliquin on December 13, rejecting all of his arguments.

Poliquin appealed to the Court of Appeals in Boston, Massachusetts and requested an order to prevent Golden from being certified as the winner, but that request was also rejected. On December 24, Poliquin dropped his lawsuit, allowing Golden to take the seat.

Instant-runoff voting was retained for the 2020 U.S. Senate and U.S. House elections.

==== Presidential elections ====
On August 26, 2019, the Maine Legislature passed a bill adopting instant-runoff voting for both presidential primaries and the general election. On September 6, 2019, Governor Janet Mills allowed the bill to become law without her signature, which delayed it from taking effect until after the 2020 presidential primaries in March. It was used in the general election, making Maine the first state to use instant-runoff voting for a presidential general election.

In June 2020, the Maine Republican Party filed signatures for a veto referendum to ask voters if they want the law repealed and preclude the use of instant-runoff voting for the 2020 election. Matthew Dunlap, Maine's secretary of state, rejected a number of signatures that had not been collected by a registered voter as required under the state constitution, resulting in there being insufficient signatures for the veto referendum to qualify for the ballot. A challenge to Dunlap's decision in Maine Superior Court was successful for the Maine Republican Party, but the case was appealed to the Maine Supreme Judicial Court. On September 8, the court issued a stay of the Superior Court ruling pending appeal on the merits, causing confusion and uncertainty regarding the 2020 election. Nevertheless, ballots began being printed later that day without the veto referendum and including instant-runoff voting for the presidential election. The court ruled in favor of the secretary of state on September 22, allowing instant-runoff voting to be used. An emergency appeal to the U.S. Supreme Court claiming a First Amendment violation was denied by Justice Stephen Breyer (the circuit justice for the First Circuit) on October 6.

It was predicted that implementation of instant-runoff voting could potentially delay the projection of the winner(s) of Maine's electoral votes for days after election day, and could also complicate interpretation of the national popular vote. However, the 2020 United States presidential election in Maine was won statewide and in the 1st congressional district by Joe Biden and in the 2nd congressional district by Donald Trump with majorities, so instant runoff vote transfers did not need to be conducted, and did not impact the determination of the winners or the national popular vote tally.

=== Alaska, 2022–present ===
In the 2020 Alaska elections, voters approved Measure 2, which replaced party primaries with a nonpartisan jungle primary, in which the top four candidates advance to a general election that uses instant-runoff voting. This system is now used for all state, federal, and presidential elections (except presidential primaries, which continue to be partisan). The first election using the system was held on August 16, 2022, and elected Democrat Mary Peltola to Congress over Republicans Sarah Palin and Nick Begich.

In 2024, Alaskans voted on a measure to repeal the ranked-choice voting system and return to partisan primaries. Following an extended vote count, the measure narrowly failed by a margin of 737 votes, keeping the ranked-choice voting system in place. Another measure seeking to repeal the ranked-choice voting system gathered enough signatures to appear on Alaska ballots in 2026, as 2026 Alaska Measure 2. The measure subsequently failed to pass 53.52% to 46.48%.

=== Hawaii, 2023–present ===
On June 17, 2022, Hawaii Governor David Ige signed Senate Bill 2162 into law allowing for the use of instant-runoff voting for the special election of federal and county council offices. Special elections in Hawaii have candidates of all parties appear on the same ballot. Before the change to instant-runoff voting, the winner was whoever received a plurality of votes, unique among states. The bill's author, State Senator Karl Rhoads, expressed support for the use of instant-runoff voting in special elections stating: "You often get a long list of people who are running and what it results in if it's just the plurality winner, you can get a winner with 10% of the vote, and that doesn't really truly reflect the will of the people [in] that district".

=== District of Columbia, 2026–present ===
In November 2024, the District of Columbia voted for Initiative 83 or the Make All Votes Count Act of 2024, which will allow registered independents to participate in party primaries and implement ranked-choice voting in all presidential, federal, and district elections by 2026.

== Use of instant-runoff voting at local levels ==
According to Deb Otis, director of research and policy at FairVote, the use of instant-runoff voting by one or two cities can lead to other cities in the region adopting the system. Examples of this include the San Francisco Bay Area and Minnesota.

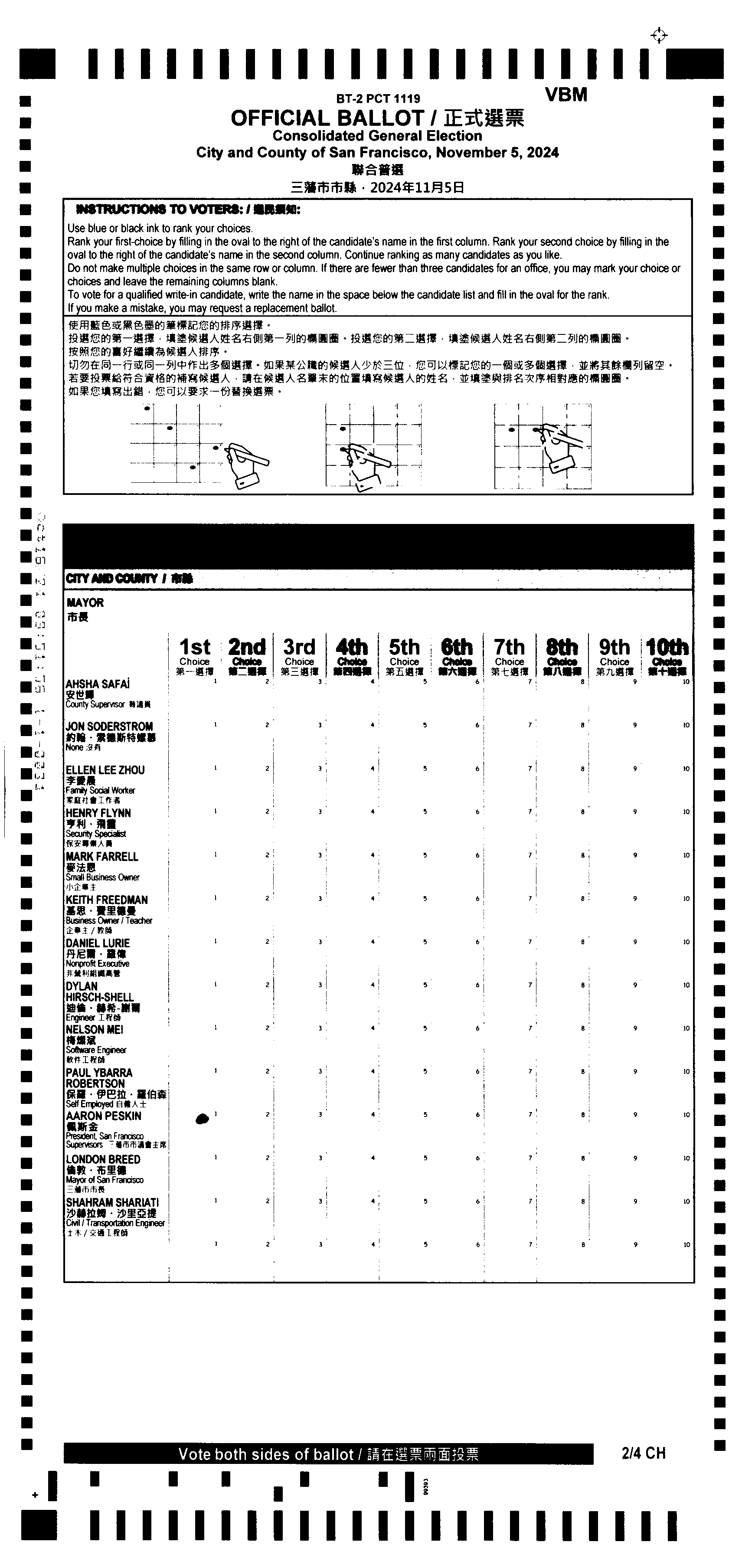
A ranked-choice ballot for San Francisco's 2024 mayoral election

=== California ===
California
Municipality	Office(s)	Date Passed	Margin Passed	First Use Date
Berkeley	Mayor, auditor, and city council	March 2, 2004	72%	November 2, 2010
Oakland	Mayor, city council, city attorney, city auditor, and school directors	November 7, 2006	67%	November 2, 2010
Ojai	City council	November 8, 2022	56%	November 5, 2024
San Francisco	All city officials	March 5. 2002	55%	October 2004
San Leandro	Mayor and city council	November 7, 2000 January 19, 2010	63% 5-2	November 2, 2010
Palm Desert	City council	May 14, 2020	5-0	November 8, 2022
Eureka	Mayor and city council	November 3, 2020	63%	2026 (Planned)

=== Colorado ===
Colorado
Municipality	Office(s)	Date Passed	Margin Passed	First Use Date
Basalt	Mayor	2002	—	2004
Boulder	Mayor	November 3, 2020	78%	November 7, 2023
Broomfield	Mayor and city council	November 2, 2021	52%	November 7, 2023
Carbondale	—	April 29, 2003	80%	Yet to implement
Fort Collins	All city officials	November 8, 2022	58%	2025

=== Illinois ===
Illinois
Municipality	Office(s)	Date Passed	Margin Passed	First Use Date
Evanston	Mayor, city council and city clerk	November 8, 2022	82%	Nullified by Court
Oak Park	Village president and trustees	November 5, 2024	79%	April 6, 2027
Skokie	Mayor, trustees, and city clerk	April 1, 2025	58%	April 6, 2027

=== Maine ===
Maine
Municipality	Office(s)	Date Passed	Margin Passed	First Use Date
Portland	Mayor	November 2, 2010	52%	November 8, 2011
Portland	All other city officials	March 3, 2020	—	
Westbrook	All city elections	November 2, 2021	63%	—

=== Maryland ===
Maryland
Municipality	Office(s)	Date Passed	Margin Passed	First Use Date
Takoma Park	Mayor and city council	November 8, 2005	84%	January 30, 2007

=== Massachusetts ===
Massachusetts
Municipality	Office(s)	Date Passed	Margin Passed	First Use Date
Easthampton	Mayor and city council	November 5, 2019	55%	November 2, 2021
Amherst	Town Council, school committee, library trustees (using multi-member districts)	2018		TBD (Note: Implementation of Ranked-choice voting requires state approval.)

=== Michigan ===
Michigan
Municipality	Office(s)	Date Passed	Margin Passed	First Use Date
Ann Arbor	All city officials	2021		TBD
East Lansing	Mayor, City Commissioners	2023	52.5%	TBD
Ferndale		2004	68%	TBD
Kalamazoo	Mayor, City Commissioners	2023	71%	TBD
Royal Oak	Mayor, City Commissioners	2023	50.5%	TBD

=== Minnesota ===
Minnesota
Municipality	Office(s)	Date Passed	Margin Passed	First Use Date
Minneapolis	All city officials	November 7, 2006	65%	November 3, 2009
St. Louis Park	Mayor and city council	April 2018	—	November 5, 2019
Saint Paul	Mayor and city council	November 4, 2009	52%	November 2011
Minnetonka	Mayor and city council	November 3, 2020	55%	November 2021
Bloomington, Minnesota	Mayor and city council	November 3, 2020	51%	November 2, 2021

=== New Mexico ===
New Mexico
Municipality	Office(s)	Date Passed	Margin Passed	First Use Date
Santa Fe	Mayor and city council	March 4, 2008	65%	March 6, 2018
Las Cruces	Mayor and city council	June 2018	6–0	November 5, 2019

=== New York ===
New York
Municipality	Office(s)	Date Passed	Margin Passed	First Use Date
New York City	Mayor, public advocate, comptroller, borough president, and city council	November 5, 2019	73%	February 2, 2021

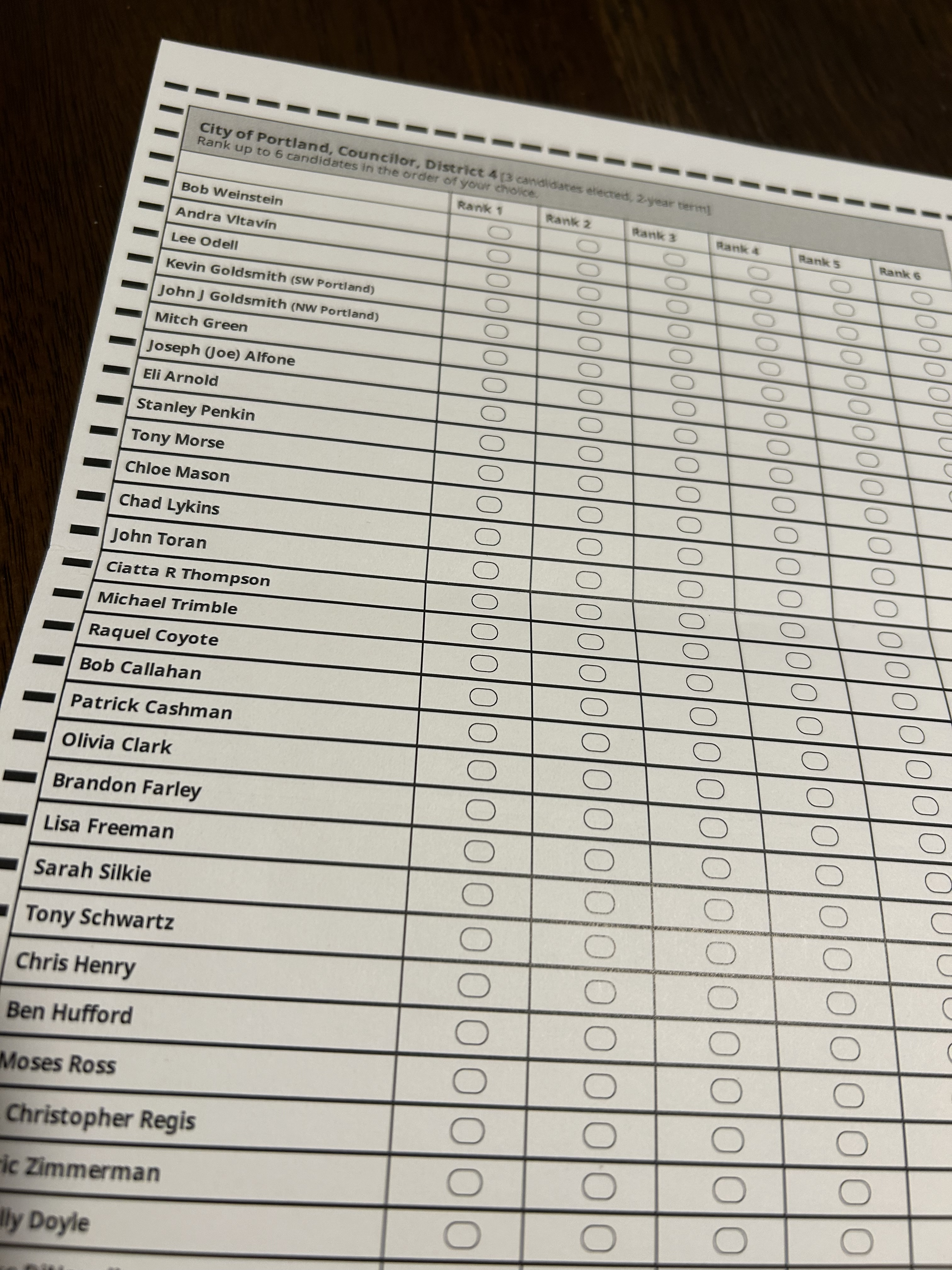
A ranked-choice ballot for Portland, Oregon's 2024 City Council election

=== Oregon ===
Oregon
Municipality	Office(s)	Date Passed	Margin Passed	First Use Date
Benton County	All county officials	November 8, 2016	54%	November 3, 2020
Corvallis	All city officials	January 19, 2022	9-0	November 8, 2022
Multnomah County	All county officials	November 8, 2022	67%	2026
Portland	Mayor and auditor	November 8, 2022	—	November 5, 2024

=== Utah ===
In 2018, Utah passed a law allowing municipalities to opt in to a temporary instant-runoff voting trial, the Municipal Alternative Voting Methods Pilot Project, starting with the 2019 municipal elections and ending with the 2025 elections.

Utah
Municipality	Office(s)	Participation Years
Vineyard	—	2019–2023
Payson	—	2019–2023
Salt Lake City	—	2021–2023
Springville	—	2021
Draper	—	2021
Lehi	—	2021–2023
Riverton	—	2021
Goshen	—	2021
Newton	Town council	2021
Woodland Hills	—	2021–2023
Heber City	Mayor and city council	2021–2023
Moab	Mayor and city council	2021
Genola	—	2021–2023
Sandy	—	2021
South Salt Lake	—	2021–2023
Magna	—	2021–2023
Bluffdale	—	2021
Nibley	Mayor and city council	2021
Millcreek	—	2021–2023
River Heights	City council	2021
Cottonwood Heights	—	2021
Midvale	—	2021–2023
Kearns	—	2023

=== Vermont ===
Vermont
Municipality	Office(s)	Date Passed	Margin Passed	First Use Date
Burlington	City council	March 2, 2021	64%	2022
Burlington	Mayor, city councilors, school commissioners, ward clerks, and inspectors of election	March 2023	64%	2024

=== Virginia ===
The Virginia legislature passed a bill in 2020 providing a local option for municipalities to use the single transferable vote through 2031.

Virginia
Municipality	Office(s)	Date Passed	Margin Passed	First Use Date
Arlington County	County board	December 2022	—	June 20, 2023

=== Washington ===
Seattle's adoption of RCV is notable in two distinct ways. The voters were first asked if they wanted to change the voting system at all, and then were asked to choose between RCV and approval voting. Additionally, RCV will be used for the primary, whereas use in the general is more typical.

Washington
Municipality	Office(s)	Date Passed	Margin Passed	First Use Date
Seattle	All city primaries	November 7, 2022	51%	August 3, 2027 (Planned)

== Use in party-run primaries, caucuses, and conventions ==
=== Democratic presidential primaries, 2020 ===
Five states used RCV in the 2020 Democratic Party presidential primaries, some in response to COVID-19 making an in-person caucus too risky. Alaska, Hawaii, Kansas, and Wyoming used it for all voters and Nevada used it for absentee caucus voters. Rather than eliminating candidates until a single winner is chosen, voters' choices were reallocated until all remaining candidates had at least 15%, the threshold to receive delegates to the convention. While all candidates but one had dropped out by the time of the four primaries, use of RCV ensured that voters who selected non-competing candidates as their first choice would not have their votes wasted, but rather used toward determining delegate allocation among the remaining candidates.

=== Utah Republican Party ===
After voting to authorize its use, the Utah Republican Party used RCV in 2002, 2003 and 2004 at its statewide convention, including in a contested race to nominate a governor in 2004. In 2005, Republicans used repeated balloting for its statewide convention and has done so in subsequent years. Some county Republican parties like Cache County continue to use instant-runoff voting at their conventions.

=== Democratic Party of Virginia ===
RCV was used in 2014 by leaders of the Henrico County Democrats in a three-candidate special election nomination contest for the House of Delegates in December 2014.

=== Republican Party of Virginia ===
In 2021, the Republican Party of Virginia nominated candidates for governor, lieutenant governor and attorney general in a party convention that used ranked-choice voting.

=== Indiana Republican Party ===
In 2020, the Indiana Republican Party used ranked-choice voting to nominate its candidate for attorney general.

== Absentee use ==
Several states jurisdictions that hold runoff elections allow certain categories of absentee voters to submit ranked-choice ballots, because the interval between votes is too short for a second round of absentee voting. Ranked-choice ballots enable long-distance absentee votes to count in the runoff election if their first choice does not make the runoff. Alabama, Arkansas, Mississippi, Louisiana, Georgia, and South Carolina all use ranked-choice ballots for overseas and military voters in federal elections that might go to a runoff. Springfield, Illinois follows the same practice for city elections after voters approved it with 91% support.

== Use of single transferable vote ==
Several cities have adopted the single transferable vote, which is a form of proportional representation election system that uses ranked votes to elect multiple members.

Local Governments using single transferable vote
Local Government	Office(s)	Date Passed	Margin Passed	First Use Date
Arden, Delaware	Board of Assessors	1912	—	—
Cambridge, Massachusetts	City council and school committee	—	—	1941
Minneapolis, Minnesota	Park Board	November 7, 2006	65%	November 3, 2009
Eastpointe, Michigan	City Council	June 5, 2019	—	2019
Albany, California	City Council and School Board	November 3, 2020	73%	November 8, 2022
Portland, Maine	All multi-seat offices	November 8, 2022	63%	—
Portland, Oregon	City commissioner	November 8, 2022	58%	November 4, 2024
Arlington County	County Board	December 2022	—	June 20, 2023
Easthampton, Massachusetts	City council and school committee	November 7, 2023	62%	2025

=== Virginia ===
The Virginia legislature passed a bill in 2020 allowing for local governing bodies to adopt the single transferable vote through 2031.

=== Michigan ===
==== Eastpointe ====
Entered a consent decree with the US Department of Justice to implement RCV for city council elections for at least four years starting in 2019 to address claims of racial discrimination. Multi-winner RCV (single transferable vote) would have been used, with two city council members elected at each staggered election.

== Stalled implementations ==
=== Texas ===
==== Austin ====
In 2021, Austin voters approved a ballot measure 59–41% to adopt ranked-choice voting for city elections, replacing the two-round system. However, it is not clear if the reference to "majority" in state law allows its use.

=== Michigan ===
Although five municipalities in Michigan (Ann Arbor, East Lansing, Ferndale, Kalamazoo, and Royal Oak) have voted in favor of implementing ranked-choice voting, state-wide electoral law in Michigan prevents ranked-choice voting from occurring. Due to a lawsuit by the Department of Justice, the city of Eastpointe uses a ranked-choice system to elect its city council.

=== Massachusetts ===
==== Amherst ====
Despite passing ranked-choice voting in 2018, Amherst has not yet received approval from Massachusetts' state legislature, and therefore were unable to implement the reform.

=== Pennsylvania ===
As of 2026 ranked-choice voting is still not approved in Pennsylvania, although there have been many efforts to try and introduce it. In November 2025 State Representative Christopher Rabb introduced House Bill 123, which could allow Pennsylvania counties and municipalities to adopt ranked-choice voting for the local elections. The bill itself was then referred to the House State Government Committee. In May 2026, Philadelphia City Council also passed a resolution supporting legislation that would allow local governments to use ranked-choice voting.

== Bans on use ==
As of March 2026, nineteen states, all Republican controlled, prohibit ranked-choice voting.

On February 28, 2022, Tennessee became the first state to ban ranked-choice voting state-wide. The sponsor of the bill, then Republican State Senator Brian Kelsey, said the ban was "a win for protecting election integrity and ensuring voter clarity at the ballot box." Florida quickly followed with a similar ban, when governor Ron DeSantis signed senate bill 524 into law on April 25. In spring of the following year, there was another string of bans in red states, with Idaho passing a ban on March 23, South Dakota on March 21, and Montana on April 26, 2023. Between April and June 2024, the use of RCV was banned statewide in Kentucky, Alabama, Mississippi, Louisiana, and Oklahoma. In November 2024, Missouri voters approved a ballot initiative that banned ranked-choice voting. In the first half of 2025, five more states banned the practice: Arkansas, Kansas, North Dakota, West Virginia, and Wyoming. In 2026, two more states banned ranked-choice voting: Indiana and Ohio.

== Repeals ==
Between 1912 and 1930, limited forms of ranked-choice voting were implemented and subsequently repealed in Florida, Indiana, Maryland, Minnesota, and Wisconsin. In the 1970s, it was implemented in Ann Arbor, Michigan, but quickly repealed after only a single election. More recently, it was adopted and repealed in Pierce County, Washington (2006–2009); Burlington, Vermont (2005–2010); and Aspen, Colorado (2007–2010). It has since been reinstated in Burlington, and Ann Arbor residents voted to reinstate it as well, with that use likely needing approval from Michigan's state legislature.

=== Aspen (2007–2010) ===
Aspen, Colorado passed ranked-choice voting in November 2007 for the mayoral race and for at-large council races with two winners. In March 2009, the Aspen council adopted a unique variation of RCV for the council races. A block voting tally based on the first and second rank choices was used to determine first round support. Any candidate with initial majority support was elected. If there were not two first-round winners, there was a batch elimination of low-placing candidates to reduce the number of continuing candidates before the instant runoff. In the latter case, separate rounds of ranked-choice counting would be conducted for each council seat, with the winner of the first seat eliminated from the race for the second seat.

Aspen's first elections with RCV and the new city council system were on May 5, 2009. The number of voters was the highest in the history of Aspen elections. Mick Ireland was re-elected as mayor in the fourth round of a four-candidate race. Both city council incumbents were defeated in the two-seat RCV election in which nine candidates participated. The winners were selected after RCV tallies. 168 spoiled ballots were recast by voters alerted to errors by their optical scanning machine. The city reported 0% invalid ballots in the mayor's race and 0.9% invalid ballots in the two-seat city council elections.

The elections were close, and some Aspen observers argued that a traditional runoff system would have given more time to consider their top choices. There also was debate over how to implement audit procedures. In 2009, voters rejected an advisory measure to maintain IRV and in 2010, approved a binding amendment to return to a traditional runoff system.

=== Telluride (2011–2019) ===
On November 4, 2008, voters in the town of Telluride, Colorado, passed an ordinance with 67% of the vote to adopt RCV for the next three mayoral elections, starting in November 2011 if three candidates file for the office. The system was used for the city's 2011 mayoral election. The incumbent mayor Stu Fraser was re-elected by securing a majority of first choices. In the 2015 mayoral election, Sean Murphy handily won an open seat election for mayor after trailing in first choices.

Per the initial ballot measure, RCV could have continued after three elections with approval from the Town Council. That action was not taken so in 2023, the city returned to first-past-the-post voting.

=== Ann Arbor (1974–1976) ===
Ranked-choice voting (then called preferential voting) was adopted for mayoral races in Ann Arbor, Michigan in 1974 after a successful ballot initiative sponsored by the local Human Rights Party. RCV was used in the 1975 mayoral election. Democratic Party nominee Albert H. Wheeler, the city's first African-American mayor, won after trailing the Republican incumbent 49% to 40% in the first round of counting, with remaining votes cast for the Human Rights Party nominee. The ousted incumbent Stephenson alleged in a lawsuit that RCV violated the equal protection clause, but the county circuit court upheld the voting system.

In April 1976, 62% of voters voted to repeal RCV.

=== North Carolina ===
A 2006 law established that ranked-choice voting would be used when judicial vacancies were created between a primary election and sixty days before a general election. The law also established a pilot program for RCV for up to 10 cities in 2007 and up to 10 counties for 2008; to be monitored and reported to the 2007–2008 General Assembly. In November 2010, North Carolina had three RCV elections for local-level superior court judges, each with three candidates, and a statewide IRV election for a North Carolina Court of Appeals seat (with 13 candidates). The Court of Appeals race is believed to be the first time RCV has been used in any statewide general election in the United States.

Several municipalities considered participating in the RCV pilot in 2007. Cary, Hendersonville and Kinston voted to participate; Kinston dropped out because there were not enough candidates running to use RCV. Other cities declined to participate in the pilot. No North Carolina counties volunteered to participate in RCV in the 2008 elections held in conjunction with state and federal races. In August 2008 the governor signed legislation extending the pilot program for local elections to be held in 2009–2011.

There was much debate whether RCV was successful when it was used. This debate continued in the North Carolina legislature when it debated legislation to extend the pilot program. Some "verified voting" advocates contended that the RCV tabulation procedures used were not legal. Both advocates and opponents of the provision supported amendments to the pilot program to ensure that the local governing body of any jurisdiction participating in the pilot must approve their participation; the jurisdiction must develop and implement voter education plans; and the University of North Carolina School of Government must approve procedures for conducting RCV elections by January 2009. After these amendments were adopted, the state House of Representatives, by a majority of 65–47, rejected an amendment designed to remove the pilot program from the legislation, and the legislation ultimately won approval by both houses.

In 2009, Hendersonville again used RCV. Three candidates ran for mayor in Hendersonville in November 2009; five candidates ran for two seats on the city council using a multi-seat version of RCV. All seats were filled based on first choices without the need for further counting.

In 2011, Hendersonville's city council unanimously voted to use RCV a third time, although ultimately not enough candidates filed for office to trigger the need for the system.

The RCV pilot program was repealed by the General Assembly in 2013, meaning special judicial elections with more than two candidates would once again be decided by simple plurality.

==== Cary (2007) ====
In October 2007, the city of Cary, North Carolina used RCV for municipal election for three council seats and for mayor. The mayor's race (with two candidates) and two of the council seats (with four and three candidates on the ballot) were won with a majority in the first round. The remaining council seat, with three candidates, went to a second round of counting; the plurality winner in the first round went on to win with 50.9% of the final round vote, amounting to 46.4% of first-round ballots cast, with 8.9% of the ballots offering no preference between the top two candidates.

COUNCIL MEMBER C-B 1 CARY MUNICIPAL DISTRICT B:
Candidate	Round 1		Round 2	
Don Frantz	1151	(38.1%)	1401	(46.4%)
Vickie Maxwell	1075	(35.6%)	1353	(44.8%)
Nels Roseland	793	(26.2%)	–	
Other	3	(0.0%)	–	
Exhausted ballots	–		268	(8.9%)
Total	3022	(100%)	3022	(100%)

Cary used hand or machine-marked paper ballots that are read on optical scanners manufactured by ES&S. First column choices were tallied at the precinct. The second and third column choices were counted at a central location. In 2009, the Cary Town Council voted to use a traditional runoff method.

=== Ohio ===
==== Ashtabula ====
After home rule was adopted, Ashtabula was the first American adoption of single transferable vote in 1915. It was repealed in 1929.

==== Cincinnati ====
Cincinnati adopted a single transferable vote charter in 1925. it was in use until its repeal in 1957.

==== Cleveland ====
In 1921, Cleveland amended its charter adopting proportional representation to elect city council.^{:116} Single transferable vote with large multi member districts was used in 5 elections until repealed in 1931.

==== Hamilton ====
Hamilton changed its charter to adopt single transferable vote in 1926. It was in use until its repeal in 1960.

==== Toledo ====
Toledo adopted a single transferable vote charter in 1935. It was in use until its repeal in 1949.

=== Burlington, Vermont ===
The city of Burlington, Vermont approved ranked-choice voting for use in mayoral elections with a 64% vote in 2005. The 2006 Burlington mayoral race was decided after two rounds of tallying, and the mayoral race in 2009 was decided in three rounds. Unlike Burlington's first RCV mayoral election in 2006, the RCV winner in 2009 (VT Progressive candidate Bob Kiss) was neither the same as the plurality winner (Republican Kurt Wright) nor the majority-preferred candidate (Democrat Andy Montroll).

The results caused a post-election controversy regarding the RCV method. In late 2009, a group of several Democrats (who supported Republican Kurt Wright) led a signature drive to force a referendum on RCV. RCV was repealed in March 2010 by a vote of 52% to 48%.

=== Washington ===
==== Pierce County (2006–2009) ====
Pierce County, Washington, passed (53%) ranked-choice voting in November 2006 for most of its county offices. Voters upheld the 2008 implementation timing with a vote of 67% in 2007 and made minor adjustments to the charter language involving ballot access and numbers of rankings. Seven RCV elections took place on November 4, 2008 and one on November 3, 2009. The introduction of RCV was marked by controversies about costs and voter confusion. On November 3, 2009, voters repealed RCV.

== Rejected implementations ==
The city of Vancouver, Washington voted in 1999 to adopt RCV and the state legislature enacted enabling legislation in 2004, but the city in 2006 chose not to exercise its option. In Washington, an initiative seeking to adopt RCV in 2005 failed to garner enough signatures. In 2008, Vermont governor Jim Douglas vetoed legislation which would have established RCV for that state's congressional elections starting that year.

San Juan County, Washington put RCV to a vote in November 2022 and rejected the proposal, with 57% voting against. Voters in Clark County, Washington rejected RCV that same day, with 58% electing to keep their system unchanged.

=== State ballot initiatives ===
==== Massachusetts (2020) ====
Massachusetts rejected Ballot Question 2 in the 2020 general election, which would have authorized ranked-choice voting for "primary and general elections for all Massachusetts statewide offices, state legislative offices, federal congressional offices, and certain other offices beginning in 2022," but not "for President of the United States, county commissioner, or regional district school committee members."

==== Arizona (2024) ====
Arizona Proposition 140 was rejected by voters in 2024. It would have implemented a nonpartisan jungle primary, with the Arizona Legislature deciding how many candidates advance to the general election. Depending on how many candidates advanced, the Legislature would have been authorized to implement ranked-choice voting.

==== Colorado (2024) ====
Colorado voters rejected Proposition 131 in 2024, which if passed would have implemented a nonpartisan jungle primary where the top four candidates advance to a ranked-choice voting general election.

==== Idaho (2024) ====
Idaho voters broadly rejected a top-four jungle primary ballot measure in November 2024 by nearly 70% voting "No" (opposed). If it had passed it would have implemented a nonpartisan jungle primary where the top four candidates advance to a ranked-choice voting general election.

==== Nevada (2022/2024) ====
In the 2022 Nevada elections, voters narrowly approved Question 3, which proposed replacing party primaries with a single nonpartisan jungle primary where the top 5 candidates would advance to a general election that uses ranked-choice voting. Because the proposal would have modified the Nevada constitution, it had to be reapproved by Nevada voters in 2024 before it could take effect. In 2024, voters rejected the initiative by double digits. If reapproved, the system would have taken effect for the 2026 election cycle and been used for all state and federal elections in Nevada except President and Vice President.

==== Montana (2024) ====
Two rejected initiatives on the 2024 ballot in Montana, CI-126 and CI-127, may potentially have caused ranked-choice voting to be implemented. CI-126 would have created a nonpartisan jungle primary where the top four candidates advance to the general election. CI-127 would have mandated that the winning candidate receive 50% of the vote, but the Montana Legislature would have decided whether this is accomplished by ranked-choice voting or a runoff election.

==== Oregon (2024) ====
Oregon rejected a legislatively-referred constitutional amendment in 2024 which, if passed, would have adopted ranked-choice voting for subsequent elections for both federal offices (U.S. president, senator and representative) and state constitutional officers (governor, secretary of state, attorney general, state treasurer, and commissioner of labor and industries), as well as allowed local government bodies to adopt ranked-choice voting unless prohibited by local charter.

== Proposed laws ==
The proposed Fair Representation Act would amend several laws including the Help America Vote Act and the Reapportionment Act of 1929 to mandate the conversion of all congressional districts from single- to multi-member districts elected by RCV as well as the creation of state-level nonpartisan redistricting commissions for congressional redistricting. Originally introduced in 2017 during the 115th Congress by Don Beyer (D–VA), it was reintroduced by Beyer in 2019, 2021, and 2024. For Beyer the goal of the bill is to reduce polarization and partisanship by incentivizing elected representatives to appeal to a broader range of voters. According to proponents, ranked-choice voting and multi-seat districts would reduce the number of safe-seat districts and encourage more political competition.

== Other uses ==
The Academy Awards used single transferable voting. Many student government elections also use ranked-vote election systems.

== Discussion ==
Ranked-choice voting has been advocated for as expanding choice by encouraging more candidates to run. Proponents have argued that ranked-choice voting can reduce the spoiler effect from minor and third-party candidates. Ranked-choice advocates often emphasize that instant-runoff voting usually produces clear majority winners where plurality rules would not. Single transferable voting ensures that both the majority party, if any, plus minority parties, each receive their due share of representation.

Advocates of ranked-choice voting have framed the voting system as a potential solution to polarization as it improves voter attitudes toward democracy. These attitudinal improvements are evidenced by the voting system's positive impact on turnout and the ways that campaigns are more likely to engage in direct voter-contact mobilization strategies under ranked-choice voting. However, research suggests that ranked-choice voting performs better under only moderately polarized conditions in selecting the Condorcet winner and that polarization between racial groups may increase in ranked-choice competitions. While the candidate pool increases shortly after implementing ranked-choice voting, expanding choice for voters, the diversity of the candidate pool is not impacted and the base increase in candidates does not last in the long term. Additionally, research suggests that ranked-choice voting does not produce fiscal, ideological, or representative reforms that govern in closer alignment with public opinion as proponents suggest it might.

Opponents have argued that ranked-choice voting is confusing and causes more ballot errors, and that it could disenfranchise poorer, minority and less educated voters. Survey research has shown that voters are less comfortable with ranked-choice voting than the simpler runoff or plurality methods, and that come-from-behind victories resulting from ranked-choice voting reduces voter satisfaction. Opponents have also noted that ranked-choice voting does not fully prevent vote splitting. In a nonpartisan primary followed by ranked-choice voting, as used in Alaska, vote splitting can occur between multiple candidates of the same party.

== See also ==
- Approval voting – Single-winner electoral system
- Comparison of electoral systems
- Electoral fusion in the United States – Electoral list strategy
- First-past-the-post voting – Plurality voting system
- Instant-runoff voting – Single-winner ranked-choice electoral system
- Proportional representation in the United States – Multi-winner electoral system in the United States
- Score voting – Single-winner rated voting system
- Single transferable vote – Multi-winner electoral system
- STAR voting – Single-winner electoral system
- Top-four primary – Nonpartisan blanket primary
