= 2016 Maine Question 5 =

Referendum on instant-runoff voting

Question 5: Citizen Initiative
- An Act To Establish Ranked-Choice Voting

Results
Choice	Votes	%
Yes	388,273	52.12%
No	356,621	47.88%
Valid votes	744,894	96.53%
Invalid or blank votes	26,814	3.47%
Total votes	771,708	100.00%
Registered voters/turnout	1,058,444	72.91%
Yes
50-60%
No
50-60%

Maine Question 5, formally An Act to Establish Ranked-Choice Voting, was a citizen-initiated referendum question that qualified for the November 8, 2016 statewide ballot in Maine. It was approved by a vote of 52%–48%. It sought to change how most Maine elections were to be conducted from plurality voting to instant-runoff voting (IRV, sometimes conflated with ranked-choice voting). It appeared on the ballot along with elections for President of the United States, Maine's two U.S. House seats, the legislature, five other ballot questions, and various local elections. The referendum was successful, making Maine the first state to use ranked choice voting for its federal elections.

An advisory opinion by the Maine Supreme Judicial Court, issued on May 23, 2017, said the court would rule ranked-choice voting unconstitutional if it came before them, with respect to elections for state offices. This led the Maine Legislature to vote to delay its implementation until 2021 to allow time for a constitutional amendment to be passed to permit it. Supporters gathered signatures to force a successful people's veto referendum on the matter in order to prevent the delay.

== Background ==
In the eleven Maine gubernatorial elections prior to 2016, only two candidates (incumbent governors Joe Brennan in 1982 and Angus King in 1998) won more than 50% of the vote. Typically gubernatorial elections have more than two significant candidates; the 2010 election had five candidates, with Paul LePage emerging as the winner with 37.6% of the vote. Some public opinion felt that his victory was due to opponents of LePage dividing their votes between Democratic candidate Libby Mitchell and independent candidate Eliot Cutler.

Proposals to enact ranked-choice voting have been introduced in the legislature as early as 2003, but were rejected. After a 2010 charter change, the city of Portland began electing its mayor using ranked-choice voting in 2011. There were new legislative proposals in 2011, though they were rejected as well. In 2014, upon releasing his supporters to vote for someone else in the 2014 election, Eliot Cutler encouraged his supporters to support ranked-choice voting. Led by former independent State Senator Richard G. Woodbury, Ranked Choice Voting collected more than the 61,123 valid signatures necessary to put a proposal to voters, collecting some 40,000 on Election Day 2014. The group collected 75,369 signatures and delivered them to Maine Secretary of State Matthew Dunlap by October 19, 2015. Dunlap ultimately certified 64,687 signatures by November 18, 2015, which put the proposal on the November 2016 ballot.

Per the Maine Constitution, the proposal went to the legislature in its 2016 session, but it did not act on the measure. On January 20, 2016, the Maine House of Representatives voted to place the proposal on the ballot without holding a public hearing, over the objections of Republicans, led by Rep. Heather Sirocki, expressing concern about the constitutionality of the proposal. Secretary of State Dunlap released the final wording of the question on June 23 as it was to appear on the ballot: "Do you want to allow voters to rank their choices of candidates in elections for U.S. Senate, Congress, Governor, State Senate, and State Representative, and to have ballots counted at the state level in multiple rounds in which last-place candidates are eliminated until a candidate wins by majority?"

=== Constitutionality ===
Some, including a deputy secretary of state and a state legislator, expressed concern about the constitutionality of the proposal. Deputy Secretary of State Julie Flynn said that the Maine Constitution requires that the governor and state legislators be elected with a plurality of votes and that a system based on ranked-choice voting could be challenged in court. (The state constitution was amended in 1847, 1875, and 1880 to choose winners by plurality for house, senate, and governor, respectively. Previously, an election with no majority winner would be decided by multiple election rounds or by the state legislature.)

Flynn also expressed concern that the proposal inserts the secretary of state into the process, while the Constitution states that votes shall be tabulated by municipal officials. Maine Attorney General Janet Mills issued an opinion at the request of Maine Senate President Michael Thibodeau stating that while the referendum must appear on the ballot, it will likely require amending the Maine Constitution to implement it, in order to satisfy the concerns given by the Secretary of State's office.

She added that the manner in which the proposal addresses how a tie in the voting should be addressed, drawing lots, directly conflicted with Article V of the Maine Constitution, which states that a tie in the vote for governor would be settled by the Maine Legislature meeting in joint session to choose a winner.

The Committee for Ranked Choice Voting Maine dismissed such concerns, noting that a majority vote is always a plurality vote and that such a system has survived legal challenges in several other states. Its website statement also linked to statements by several Maine law professors supporting its arguments.

After the question was approved by voters, the Maine Senate submitted questions to the Maine Supreme Judicial Court, which issued an advisory opinion on May 23, 2017. They unanimously ruled that ranked-choice voting was unconstitutional in state, but not federal, general elections. In response, the legislature passed a law on November 4, 2017, that amended the ranked-choice voting law to apply only to primary elections for Congress, governor, state senator, and state representative; and for general elections for Congress.

The law survived a legal challenge in federal court by U.S. Representative Bruce Poliquin, who lost reelection by ranked choice voting to Jared Golden in 2018.

== Campaign ==
Supporters of the proposal, led by Ranked Choice Voting Maine, contend that it will lead to people voting for the candidate that they support and end strategic voting to vote merely for the candidate that they think will win, and that the ranked choice system will result in a candidate that has some level of support from a majority of voters. They further contend that ranked-choice voting will result in less negative campaigning, as candidates will need to appeal to a broad coalition of voters beyond their base of supporters to gain support as a second or third choice, if needed.

=== Notable endorsements ===
==== Supporters ====
Current and former state legislators
- Justin Alfond, Minority Leader of the Maine Senate, former President of the Maine Senate
- Cush Anthony, former state representative (D-Falmouth)
- Dillon Bates, state representative (D-Westbrook)
- Roberta Beavers, state representative (D-South Berwick)
- Henry Beck, state representative (D-Waterville)
- Anne Beebe-Center, state representative (D-Rockland)
- Kerri Bickford, former state representative (R-Topsham)
- Patricia Blanchette, Bangor City Councilor, former state representative
- Andrea Boland, former state representative (D-Sanford)
- Gen. Peter Bowman, former Republican state senator, former commander of the Portsmouth Naval Shipyard
- Jim Boyle, former Democratic state senator
- John Brautigam, former state representative (D-Falmouth)
- Cathy Breen, Democratic state senator
- Michael Brennan, former Mayor of Portland, former Majority Leader of the Maine Senate
- Joe Brooks, former state representative (I-Winterport)
- Tom Bull, former state representative (D-Freeport)
- Beverly Bustin, former Assistant state senate Majority Leader
- Christine Burstein, state representative (D-Lincolnville)
- Emily Cain, former state senator, Candidate for U.S. Representative
- James J. Campbell, state representative (I-Newfield)
- Ralph Chapman, state representative (D-Brooksville)
- Ben Chipman, state representative (D-Portland)
- Herbert Clark, former state representative (D-Millinocket)
- John Cleveland, former Democratic state senator
- Joan Cohen, former state representative (D-Portland)
- Janice Cooper, state representative (D-Yarmouth)
- Dennis Damon, former Democratic state senator
- Jerry Davis, former state senator and state representative (R-Falmouth)
- Michael Devin, state representative (D-Newcastle)
- Robert Duchesne, state representative (D-Hudson)
- John Eder, former state representative (G-Portland)
- Jeffrey Evangelos, state representative (I-Friendship)
- Richard Farnsworth, state representative (D-Portland)
- Susan Farnsworth, former state representative (D-Hallowell)
- Stacey Fitts, former state representative (R-Pittsfield)
- Craig Hickman, state representative (D-Winthrop)
- Roger Katz, Republican state senator
- Hannah Pingree, former Speaker of the Maine House of Representatives
- Richard G. Woodbury, former state senator and state representative (I-Yarmouth)
Mayors
- Walter Ash, Mayor of Belfast
- Alan Casavant, Mayor of Biddeford
- Nelson Durgin, Mayor of Bangor
- David Rollins, Mayor of Augusta
- Ethan Strimling, Mayor of Portland
Other politicians and individuals
- Joe Baldacci, Bangor City Councilor
- Shenna Bellows, Democratic nominee for U.S. Senate in 2014, former executive director of the American Civil Liberties Union of Maine
- Eliot Cutler, independent candidate for Governor of Maine in 2010 and 2014
- Howard Dean, former governor of Vermont, former Chairman of the Democratic National Committee
- Mark D. Grover, former Cumberland County Commissioner (2013-2014)
- David Lemoine, former Maine State Treasurer
- Chellie Pingree, U.S. Representative
Media
- MaineToday Media newspapers; Portland Press Herald, Morning Sentinel, Kennebec Journal
- Brunswick Times-Record

==== Opponents ====
- Bill Diamond, Democratic state senator, former Secretary of State of Maine
- Paul LePage, Governor of Maine
- Heather Sirocki, state representative (R-Scarborough)
- Ellsworth American
- Bangor Daily News

=== Polling ===
Date of opinion poll	Conducted by	Sample size (likely voters)	Yes	No	Undecided	Margin of Error
October 20–25, 2016	University of New Hampshire	761	49%	31%	20%	±3.6%
September 15–20, 2016	University of New Hampshire	506	48%	29%	23%	±4.3%

== Results ==
County	Yes	Votes	No	Votes
Androscoggin	49.16	27,403	50.84	28,341
Aroostook	44.88	15,561	55.12	19,112
Cumberland	59.70	102,043	40.30	68,896
Franklin	47.67	7,903	52.33	8,677
Hancock	51.27	16,382	48.73	15,568
Kennebec	50.32	33,237	49.68	32,813
Knox	55.51	12,746	44.49	10,215
Lincoln	51.27	11,020	48.73	10,474
Oxford	49.43	15,459	50.57	15,817
Penobscot	45.69	36,659	54.31	43,581
Piscataquis	41.61	3,841	58.39	5,389
Sagadahoc	53.07	11,530	46.93	10,198
Somerset	44.85	11,674	55.15	14,357
Waldo	49.84	11,262	50.16	11,334
Washington	44.33	7,247	55.67	9,102
York	54.51	61,819	45.49	51,593
UOCAVA	68.31	2,487	31.69	1,154
Total	52.12	388,273	47.88	356,621

== Maine Supreme Court ruling ==
On February 3, 2017, the Maine Senate voted 24–10 to ask the Maine Supreme Judicial Court for an advisory opinion as to the constitutionality of the approved proposal, after concerns about its constitutionality were expressed by Maine Attorney General Janet Mills.

On May 23, 2017, the Court issued its opinion that the law would be unconstitutional if it came before them, stating it would violate the provision of the Maine Constitution requiring elections to be decided by a plurality of the vote. State legislators had mixed reactions to the ruling, with Senate President Michael Thibodeau calling for the law to be repealed and Democratic State Sen. Catherine Breen stating she would propose a Constitutional amendment to permit the law. The legislature's Veterans and Legal Affairs Committee on June 8 reported out to the floor five bills in reaction to the ruling, including one that would implement ranked-choice voting in 2018 for uses unaffected by the Court's opinion - that is, congressional elections and primaries. On October 23, 2017, the legislature voted to delay implementation of the RCV law for all races until 2021, to allow for time to pass a state constitutional amendment to allow it. This repeal affects even those races not affected by the Court's opinion, with the argument that Maine voters would be confused by a mix of RCV and non-RCV choices on a ballot. However, if such an amendment is not passed, the law would be repealed.

=== People's veto ===
Supporters, angered by the delay, launched a people's veto signature-gathering effort to prevent it, pointing to its successful use in mixed-race ballots in Portland. The veto passed in June 2018 as Question 1, restoring ranked-choice voting for primary and federal elections.
