= 2018 Maine referendums =

Two referendums were placed on the statewide ballot in Maine in 2018. Both were citizen initiated proposals.

One was a special referendum election held on June 12, 2018, in conjunction with state primary elections, which covered:

- Repeal of ranked choice voting delay: This was a people's veto referendum that sought to repeal a law passed by the Maine Legislature that delayed the implementation of ranked choice voting and would possibly have led to its outright repeal. Ranked choice voting was passed by Maine voters in a 2016 referendum. The people's veto was successful, with 53.88% voting yes.

A regularly scheduled referendum election was held on November 6, 2018, in conjunction with elections for federal and state offices, which covered:

- Home health care funding: This proposal sought to implement a 3.8% tax on income above $128,400 to fund in-home health care services for elderly and disabled Mainers, as well as create a government board to administer the funds.
