= June 2018 Maine Question 1 =

Question 1: People's veto
- 12 June 2018
- Do you want to reject the parts of a new law that would delay the use of ranked-choice voting in the election of candidates for any state or federal office until 2022, and then retain the method only if the constitution is amended by December 1, 2021, to allow ranked-choice voting for candidates in state elections?

Results
Choice	Votes	%
Yes	149,900	53.88%
No	128,291	46.12%
Valid votes	278,191	98.82%
Invalid or blank votes	3,330	1.18%
Total votes	281,521	100.00%
Yes
60–70%
50–60%
No
50–60%

Maine Question 1 was a people's veto referendum that appeared on the June 12, 2018 statewide ballot. It sought to reject a law passed by the Maine Legislature that suspended the implementation of ranked-choice voting, authorized by Maine voters in a previous referendum, for use in Maine elections until and if an amendment to the Maine Constitution is passed to expressly permit it; failing that, the law would be automatically repealed in 2021. It qualified because supporters of the original referendum collected the necessary number of signatures from registered Maine voters. This vote coincided with primary elections in which party nominees for governor, U.S. Senate, U.S. House, and the Maine Legislature were chosen through RCV to run in general elections on November 6.

The people's veto was passed, with 53.88% of Maine voters voting Yes. This restored ranked choice voting for primary and federal elections.

== Background ==
On November 8, 2016, Maine voters passed Question 5, a citizen referendum to implement ranked-choice voting (RCV). Supporters expected RCV to be in place for 2018's elections, but on May 23, 2017, the Maine Supreme Judicial Court issued an advisory opinion at the request of the Maine Senate stating that RCV in general elections for state offices would be held unconstitutional if it came before the court. The opinion did not affect elections for federal offices or primary elections for state offices. RCV opponents subsequently called for the law establishing RCV to be repealed, while supporters called for a vote on a constitutional amendment to permit the law. On October 23, 2017, the legislature voted to delay implementation of the RCV law for all races until 2021. If a constitutional amendment was not passed by that point, the law would be repealed.

Unhappy with the delay, RCV supporters launched a people's veto signature-gathering effort to prevent it, pointing to RCV's successful use in mixed-race ballots in Portland. On November 6, 2017, the petition forms were approved after Governor Paul LePage waited the full 10 days he is permitted by law to allow the delay to take effect without his signature. On November 12, the effort's leaders said they had collected half the signatures needed and set a goal of finishing by December 15, though by law they had 90 days from when they started.

On February 2, 2018, RCV Maine turned in over 80,000 signatures to Maine Secretary of State Matthew Dunlap for verification. The signatures were gathered despite the coldest weather in years occurring during the gathering period. This suspended the Legislature's delay of RCV pending the outcome of the vote, meaning it would be used in the June primary elections. Dunlap said his office was exploring strategies for implementation of RCV but that it was challenging since the legislature had not given him additional resources.

On March 5, Dunlap announced that approximately 66,000 signatures had been verified, more than the 61,000 needed to place a question on the ballot.

The question that appeared on the ballot was "Do you want to reject the parts of a new law that would delay the use of ranked-choice voting in the election of candidates for any state or federal office until 2022, and then retain the method only if the constitution is amended by December 1, 2021, to allow ranked-choice voting for candidates in state elections?"

=== RCV status ===
A people's veto effort suspends the law under dispute until the result of the vote is determined. Supporters asserted this means that the law voters passed in 2016 establishing RCV should be implemented in a manner consistent with the Maine Supreme Judicial Court ruling. On March 29, 2018, Dunlap told a Maine Legislature committee hearing that in this case that means the original law is in effect, requiring the original first-past-the-post system for the upcoming primaries, unless the legislature passes an emergency change to the law or a court tells him otherwise. Dunlap said he needed clarity on the issue by April 2 so overseas ballots could be printed and sent as federal law requires. Passage of a new law seemed unlikely, as it would need a 2/3 vote to pass the legislature as an emergency measure. Maine Attorney General Janet T. Mills urged the legislature to pass a new law, saying that the signers of the people's veto petition should not be thwarted by a technicality. RCV supporters said they would seek a court injunction to order the use of RCV. On April 4, Judge Michaela Murphy ruled that Dunlap should proceed with efforts to implement RCV for the June primaries while the issues with the law are heard by the courts.

In a separate case, the Maine Senate voted 21–13 to direct Senate President Michael Thibodeau to seek intervenor status with the court in the RCV case. Majority Senate Republicans claim that Thibodeau would have standing to intervene as the Senate has a duty to defend the Maine Constitution. They additionally argued that the legislature has not approved funding specifically for RCV, and that chaos could result if losing candidates in elections began to file lawsuits over the use of RCV. Democrats rejected those arguments, stating that Republicans were cherry-picking parts of the Constitution and ignoring the parts that permit citizens to pass laws at the ballot box, and pointed out that Dunlap has the authority and funding to hold elections in general. They added that the Senate is only part of the legislative branch and that more would be needed for standing.

On April 18, the Maine Supreme Judicial Court removed the last legal roadblocks to using RCV in primary elections, upholding the lower court ruling. It also declined to hear Thibodeau's appeal, saying it would not hear a political dispute from one half of one body of the legislature.

On May 4, the Maine Republican Party filed a federal lawsuit in U.S. District Court in Bangor seeking to bar the use of RCV in its own primary, on the grounds that the party has a First Amendment right to choose its nominee as it sees fit. U.S. District Court Judge Jon Levy rejected the suit on May 29.

=== Endorsements ===
==== Supporters ====
- Norman Higgins, state representative (I-Dover-Foxcroft)
- Angus King, U.S. Senator
- Jennifer Lawrence, actress
- Peter Mills, executive director of the Maine Turnpike Authority, former Republican State Senator and brother of Maine Attorney General Janet Mills
- Jill Stein, Green Party nominee for President of the United States in 2012 and 2016
- MaineToday Media newspapers; Portland Press Herald, Kennebec Journal, Morning Sentinel
- The New York Times

==== Opponents ====
- Bangor Daily News
- Ron Collins, state senator (R-York)
- Paul LePage, Governor of Maine
- Maine Republican Party

== Results ==
The Bangor Daily News called the vote for the Yes side just after midnight on election night. RCV was subsequently implemented for the November general elections for Maine's two congressional districts.

Breakdown of voting by county
County	Yes	Votes	No	Votes
Androscoggin	46.88%	8,300	53.12%	9,408
Aroostook	47.25%	4,870	52.74%	5,436
Cumberland	60.39%	43,741	39.23%	28,240
Franklin	48.08%	3,104	50.63%	3,184
Hancock	58.83%	8,084	41.16%	5,657
Kennebec	51.49%	13,321	48.50%	12,548
Knox	59.52%	6,066	40.47%	4,124
Lincoln	54.99%	5,322	45.00%	4,356
Oxford	48.33%	5,729	51.66%	6,124
Penobscot	46.55%	11,820	53.44%	13,567
Piscataquis	42.32%	1,375	57.67%	1,874
Sagadahoc	55.62%	4,996	44.37%	3,985
Somerset	43.38%	3,701	56.61%	4,830
Waldo	56.33%	5,238	43.66%	4,060
Washington	46.19%	2,459	53.80%	2,864
York	54.58%	21,635	45.41%	18,000
UOCAVA	80.34%	139	19.65%	34
Total	53.88%	149,900	46.12%	128,291
