= Constitution of Maine =

American state constitution

The Constitution of the State of Maine established the "State of Maine" in 1820 and is the fundamental governing document of the state. It consists of a preamble and ten articles (divisions), the first of which is a "Declaration of Rights".

The preamble of Maine's constitution states the document's intents and the purpose of statehood: "Objects of government. We the people of Maine, in order to establish justice, insure tranquility, provide for our mutual defense, promote our common welfare, and secure to ourselves and our posterity the blessings of liberty, acknowledging with grateful hearts the goodness of the Sovereign Ruler of the Universe in affording us an opportunity, so favorable to the design; and, imploring God's aid and direction in its accomplishment, do agree to form ourselves into a free and independent State, by the style and title of the State of Maine and do ordain and establish the following Constitution for the government of the same."

== History ==
The Maine Constitution was approved by Congress on March 4, 1820, as part of the Missouri Compromise since the Maine Constitution did not recognize slavery while the Missouri Constitution did. The State of Maine was previously the District of Maine in the Commonwealth of Massachusetts. William King may have authored the largest part of the Maine Constitution, as he was the president of the Constitutional Convention and later elected Maine's first Governor.

Other authors of the constitution were Thomas Jefferson, John Chandler, Albion K. Parris, William Pitt Preble, and John Holmes. Thomas Jefferson authored the section of Article VIII on education. The Maine Constitution was approved by all 210 delegates to the Maine Constitutional Convention, which was held during October 1819, in Portland, Maine.

The Maine Constitution is the fourth-oldest operating state constitution in the country.

== Preamble ==
The Preamble defines the following reasons for establishing the State of Maine, which would also have served as an expression of dissatisfaction with being the District of Maine:

1. "establish justice",
2. "insure tranquility",
3. "provide for our mutual defense",
4. "promote our common welfare",
5. "secure to ourselves and our posterity the blessings of liberty".

The Preamble states that the people of Maine "do agree to form ourselves into a free and independent State, by the style and title of the State of Maine and do ordain and establish the following Constitution for the government of the same."

CONSTITUTION OF THE STATE OF MAINE

(as amended on the year of 1820)

PREAMBLE

We the people of Maine, in order to establish justice, insure tranquility, provide for our mutual defense, promote our common welfare, and secure to our selves and our posterity the blessings of liberty, acknowledging with grateful hearts the goodness of the Sovereign Ruler of the Universe in affording us an opportunity, so favorable to the design; and, imploring His aid and direct ion in its accomplishment, do agree to form ourselves into a free and independent State, by the style and title of the STATE OF MAINE, and do ordain and establish the following Constitution for the government of the same.

== Article I. "Declaration of Rights" ==
This Article contains 24 sections, of which the longest is on religious freedom. The first section starts "All people are born equally free and independent, and have certain natural, inherent and unalienable rights." The beginning is similar to the Massachusetts Constitution of 1780 which used the phrase "born free and equal", the basis for which slavery was abolished in that state in 1820.

The section on religious freedom starts with "all individuals have a natural and unalienable right to worship Almighty God according to the dictates of their own consciences". This is notably different from the Massachusetts Constitution of 1780 which referred to the "duty of all men in society, publicly, and at stated seasons to worship the Supreme being.

== Article II. "Electors" (Voters) ==
This article describes who may vote for Governor and members of the Maine Legislature. It states that every citizen of the United States of age 18 or older who has established residence in Maine shall be eligible to vote in state elections. There are certain exceptions such as "persons under guardianship for reasons of mental illness" and "persons in the military, naval or marine service of the United States." It was decided in 2001 that persons who are under guardianship are still permitted to vote.

== Article III. "Distribution of Powers" ==
This article says that "the powers of this government shall be divided into 3 distinct departments, the legislative, executive and judicial." No person may assume a position in two of the branches at once.

== Article IV: "House of Representatives, Senate, and Legislative Power" ==
Establishes the Maine House of Representatives and the Maine Senate which shall comprise the Maine Legislature. The number of members of each body are set, and their duties are described. This article also describes the establishment of districts, how members are elected by Electors in each district, the qualifications for office, a residency requirement, etc.

However, this article also reserves to the people certain important powers. "The people reserve to themselves power to propose laws and to enact or reject the same at the polls independent of the Legislature." Also the people reserve the "power at their own option to approve or reject at the polls any Act, bill, resolve or resolution passed by the joint action of both branches of the Legislature, and the style of their laws and Acts shall be, 'Be it enacted by the people of the State of Maine.'"

"Legislative Powers" describes when the Legislature shall meet and allows the Governor 10 days to approve legislation. The Governor is also granted the "line-item veto of dollar amounts appearing in appropriation or allocation sections of legislative documents."

Also duties of the Legislature are described, however "all bills for raising a revenue shall originate in the House of Representative." This means if the Senate passes legislation which raises revenue it is constitutionally invalid if the House of Representatives has not previously acted on it.

Maine is one of the states which prohibits the legislature from chartering corporations. This is dealt with in Article IV Part Third, Sections 13 and 14.

Section 13 Special legislation. The Legislature shall, from time to time, provide, as far as practicable, by general laws, for all matters usually pertaining to special or private legislation.

Section 14 Corporations, formed under general laws. Corporations shall be formed under general laws, and shall not be created by special Acts of the Legislature, except for municipal purposes, and in cases where the objects of the corporation cannot otherwise be attained; and, however formed, they shall forever be subject to the general laws of the State.

In 1969, Maine became a Home Rule State through a constitutionally defined process. In 1976 the Maine Legislature reclaimed central power by decreeing that centrally managing the economy is an essential government function. The authority to regulate the economy was already established by Article IV, Part Third, Section 13 of the Maine Constitution, leaving the interpretation that in the new centrally managed economy, the government’s role is participatory.

The participatory function is confirmed when the term "an essential governmental function" is applied to the Maine Development Foundation in a new law, PL 1977, c. 548, §1.

There is a need to establish a new basis for a creative partnership of the private and public sectors for economic development, a partnership which can capitalize on the interests, resources, and efforts of each sector, but which does not compromise the public interest or the profit motive. The state's solitary burden to provide for development should lessen through involving the private sector in a leadership role. [PL 1977, c. 548, §1 (NEW).]

The most common conflict of interest is between the public interest and the profit motive. Over the years, the Maine Legislature developed workarounds to Home Rule such as §5654. Conditional gifts that leave the local residents out of the decision-making process while creating local expenditures “in perpetuity”

In 2022, HP 1489 instituted state-wide municipal ordinances that required every municipality to have “priority zones” where housing density could not be regulated, short-term rentals are not allowed, and references could not be made to “character of location, “overpopulation, or “overcrowding”, ensuring equal protection under the law.

The default housing zones are governed by local municipal ordinances. This brings into play Article IV Part Third Sections 13 & 14 of the Maine Constitution. The priority zone ordinances are state-wide, while the default ordinances are local. The state-wide municipal ordinances are enacted by statutory law. The local ordinances are governed by the Maine Constitution.

Section 13 speaks of regulatory laws, which are general laws applying to all matters that might otherwise have been assigned to special or private legislation. Section 14 underscores that all corporations are formed under general laws forbidding the Legislature from forming a corporation unless there is no other way to achieve its object, such as a private corporation formed under general laws.

Sections 13 and 14 do not speak of essential government functions and yet express an inherent constitutional principle of the United States, that of the separation of powers. The arguable intent of sections 13 & 14 is to establish that the essential government function is to regulate industry and not to participate in industry, which requires incorporation. Many entities are participating in a field, but only one entity regulates the field, and that is the government, making regulation an essential government function. A regulatory institution cannot participate in the field that it regulates because to do so is a conflict of interest. This interpretation aligns with the first object of government declared in the Preamble to the Maine Constitution: “establish justice”. Justice balances conflicts of interest.

In 2021, the Maine Legislature established the Maine Space Corporation without including the words that the corporation is “an essential government function.” The space industry is booming in the private sector. Conflicts of interest between the space industry and other industries, including access to coastal areas and environmental concerns, led the Maine Space Corporation to shift its focus from land-based launch sites to sea-based platforms, which do not escape the conflicts of interest. Now the Maine Space Corporation is planning to launch in federal waters where federal regulations apply, but the federal government has its own special interests in the space industry, leaving it up to the states to be regulatory institutions that have not created a conflict of interest by participating in the field of regulation.

Despite the constitutional prohibition, the legislature has embedded a complex corporate network of corporations that serve as "an instrumentality of the state" and declared to be "essential government functions" and are linked to a network of "public-private relationships" also referred to as 'quasis" and business consortiums". This has largely occurred since 1977 when the Maine Legislature chartered the Maine Development Foundation as a non-profit corporation to serve as an instrumentality of the state with the expressed intent to establish legislative authority to centrally manage Maine's economy:

§915. Legislative findings and intent: "There is a need to establish a new basis for a creative partnership of the private and public sectors ... but which does not compromise the public interest or the profit motive. The state's solitary burden to provide for development should lessen through involving the private sector in a leadership role ..... The foundation shall exist as a not-for-profit corporation with a public purpose, and the exercise by the foundation of the powers conferred by this chapter shall be deemed and held to be an essential governmental function.

In Governor Seldon Connor's inaugural address of 1876, he said these words pertaining to the new constitutional amendment:

"Section thirteen presents a discretionary field of action which your own honor will impel you to occupy to the fullest extent.'The title of 'Special and Private Laws,' which includes so large a portion of the laws of former Legislatures, is an obnoxious one, conveying suggestions of privilege, favoritism and monopoly; though happily these evils have not in fact, stained the character of our legislation, they should not be suffered to have, even in the form of our laws, any grounds of suspicion that can be removed. Other weighty objections to special laws for private benefit are, that they are obtained at the public expense, and in their passage distract the attention of legislators from matters of public interest. The opportunity is now afforded, and the duty enjoined upon you, by the amendment, to restrict the necessity for such laws to the narrowest possible limits. An analysis and classification of the private and special laws upon the statute books, will inform you of the objects for which it is desirable to provide by general laws, if practicable. 'Many objects have been hitherto specially legislated upon although they were amply provided for by general laws. I have distinguished authority for the statement that sixty or more of the corporations created by a special act for each, by the last Legislature, could have been created and organized under general laws. The reason why the general laws have not been resorted to a greater extent, is not, so far as I am informed, to be found in any insufficiency or defect of those laws, but in the greater ease and simplicity of the method of application to the Legislature and in the fancied higher [146 Me. 323] sanction of an authority proceeding directly from it. Section fourteen, relating to corporations is compressive and peremptory.. It relates to all corporations, except only those for municipal purposes. It clearly prohibits their creation by special acts if the objects desired can be secured under existing general laws."

== Article V: "Executive Power, Secretary, Treasurer" ==
This article describes the powers, election, and duties of the Governor, Secretary of State and State Treasurer. The article gives to the Governor "the supreme executive power of this State". Also the Governor is given the title of the "commander in chief of the army and navy of the State, and of the militia, except when the same are called into the actual service of the United States."

The article also describes the compensation of the Governor and their power to appoint members of the judiciary who are not directly elected, as well as civil and military officers.

== Article VI: "Judicial Power" ==
This article establishes and describes the powers of the Maine Supreme Judicial Court, and such other courts as the Legislature shall from time to time establish." Also the length of office is set – 7 years, etc. Also judges and registers of probate are to be elected by voters in their respective counties.

This article also says that the Justices of the Maine Supreme Judicial Court "shall be obliged to give their opinion upon important questions of law, and upon solemn occasions, when required by the Governor, Senate or House of Representatives." Such an opinion is called an Advisory opinion.

== Article VII: "Military" ==
This article describes the state militia, and says that "all commissioned officers of shall be appointed and commissioned by the Governor". This section also describes the Adjutant General of the Maine National Guard who is appointed by the Governor, and describes the organization, armament and discipline of.

This section also says that certain classes of people are exempted, such as the Quakers and Shakers, but otherwise "able-bodied" persons between the ages of 18 and 45 are not exempted from service in the militia.

== Article VIII: "Education and Municipal Home Rule" ==
This section says the Legislature shall require towns to support public schools since "a general diffusion of the advantages of education being essential to the preservation of the rights and liberties of the people." Also authority is granted to "pledge the credit of the State and to issue bonds for loans to Maine students in higher education and their parents." Municipalities are granted the power to amend their charters and to issue bonds for industrial purposes.

== Article IX: "General Provisions" ==
This section sets the oath of office, the date of elections, and allows for impeachment. It also states that all "taxes upon real and personal estate, assessed by authority of this State, shall be apportioned and assessed equally according to the just value thereof." However the Legislature is allowed to set special assessments for the following types of property, including: certain farms and agricultural lands, timberlands and woodlands, open space lands, and waterfront land that supports commercial fishing.

Section 14 deals with debt and the ratification of bonds. It sets a $2,000,000 debt and liability limit except to suppress insurrection, to repel invasion, or for purposes of war and provides conditions for temporary loans to be repaid within 12 months. It mandates that specific fiscal information must accompany bond questions presented on to the electorate and provides further stipulations on the issuing of bonds.

Section 14 A-D specifies conditions for insuring loans and bonds.

== Article X: "Additional Provisions" ==
This section contains several sections with no stated overall theme. Notably, Section 7 prohibited the printing of Sections 1, 2, and 5, while stating that they nonetheless remain in force. The effect of this suppression with respect to Section 5 has been controversial, as described below. Section 7 was repealed on November 7, 2023.

Section 1 dictates the time, place, and apportionment of the first meeting of the legislature. (Printing disallowed by Section 7.)

Section 2 states the terms of the first office holders under the constitution. (Printing disallowed by Section 7.)

Section 3 confirms that previously existing laws will continue in force unless "repugnant to this constitution."

Section 4 defines the amendment process, which starts with the legislature.

Section 5 incorporates parts of the Massachusetts law authorizing its separation of Maine, including its stated original office holders. (Printing disallowed by Section 7; as described below, this is a source of controversy.)

Section 6 tasks the Chief Justice to re-organize the constitution as it gets changed. "And the Constitution, with the amendments made thereto, in accordance with the provisions thereof, shall be the supreme law of the State."

Section 7 forbade the printing of sections 1, 2, and 5, while stating that they remain valid. The full text is:

Section 7. Original sections 1, 2, 5, of Article X not to be printed; section 5 in full force. Sections 1, 2 and 5, of Article X of the Constitution, shall hereafter be omitted in any printed copies thereof prefixed to the laws of the State; but this shall not impair the validity of acts under those sections; and said section 5 shall remain in full force, as part of the Constitution, according to the stipulations of said section, with the same effect as if contained in said printed copies.

Section 7 was repealed by a popular referendum, on November 7, 2023.

=== Controversy over Section 7's suppression of Section 5, and subsequent repeal ===
In 2015, Henry John Bear, Representative for the Maliseet tribe, introduced a bill (L.D. 893) proposing an amendment that would repeal Section 7's ban on printing Section 5. In splitting from Massachusetts, Maine was required to adopt its obligations and treaties with the tribes, and to set aside land for them. These requirements are enumerated in Section 5, primarily in its subsection 5. (Bear introduced another version of this bill in 2017 as L.D. 428.)

One view is that Section 7 is simple bookkeeping for obsolete clauses. Bear and others see its suppression in print as symbolic of Maine neglecting its responsibilities to the tribes, saying it has aided in them being forgotten by the state. As an example, they point to a 1967 letter from Maine's Indian Affairs Commissioner Edward Hinckley. Section 5 required Maine to set aside $30,000 worth of land for which Massachusetts paid the new state, but, Hinckley noted, no such land was allocated.

The section was adopted in 1875, officially as a "decluttering" of the constitution. State Senator Chris Johnson of Somerville, who assumed office in 2012, objected: "We should not be hiding part of our guiding document that still is in force today."

Because the redacted sections have continued to be in effect, publishing Section 5 would have no other formal legal consequences.

It is debated whether the language in Section 5 has any current application or if those clauses have all been superseded by later actions.

One direct consequence of Section 7 is that the bill to revoke it, L.D. 893, cannot legally contain the text of Section 5.

Historian Catherine M. Burns links the redaction of Article X, Section 5 to actions taken by the state in 1875 to settle Joseph Granger v. Peter Avery, a Maine Supreme Judicial Court case involving a dispute related to a 1794 Passamaquoddy treaty with Massachusetts. She published her findings in “ ‘It May Be Questionable’: Granger v. Avery and the Redaction of Article X, Section 5 from the Maine Constitution,” available in the Fall 2021 issue of the journal Maine History.

Section 7 was repealed on November 7, 2023, by a statewide ballot measure, in which voters overwhelmingly voted to repeal Section 7, by a 46% margin of 73% to 27%.

=== Text of Article X, Section 5 ===
The following is the text of Section 5:

Sect. 5. All officers provided for in the sixth section of an act of the Commonwealth of Massachusetts, passed on the nineteenth day of June, in the year of our Lord one thousand eight hundred and nineteen, entitled "an act relating to the separation of the district of Maine from Massachusetts proper, and forming the same into a separate and independent state," shall continue in office as therein provided; and the following provisions of said act shall be a part of this constitution, subject however to be modified or annulled as therein is prescribed, and not otherwise, to wit:

Sect. 1. Whereas it has been represented to this legislature, that a majority of the people of the district of Maine are desirous of establishing a separate and independent government within said district: therefore,

Be it enacted by the senate and house of representatives in general court assembled, and by the authority of the same, That the consent of this commonwealth be, and the same is hereby given, that the district of Maine may be formed and erected into a separate and independent state, if the people of the said district shall in the manner, and by the majority hereinafter mentioned, express their consent and agreement thereto, upon the following terms and conditions: and provided the congress of the United States shall give its consent thereto, before the fourth day of March next: which terms and conditions are as follows, viz.

First. All the lands and buildings belonging to the commonwealth, within Massachusetts proper, shall continue to belong to said commonwealth, and all the lands belonging to the commonwealth, within the district of Maine, shall belong, the one half thereof to the said commonwealth, and the other half thereof, to the state to be formed within the said district, to be divided as is hereinafter mentioned; and the lands within the said district, which shall belong to the said commonwealth, shall be free from taxation, while the title to the said lands remains in the commonwealth; and the rights of the commonwealth to their lands, within said district, and the remedies for the recovery thereof, shall continue the same, within the proposed state, and in the courts thereof, as they now are within the said commonwealth, and in the courts thereof; for which purposes, and for the maintenance of its rights, and recovery of its lands, the said commonwealth shall be entitled to all other proper and legal remedies, and may appear in the courts of the proposed state and in the courts of the United States, holden therein; and all rights of action for, or entry into lands, and of actions upon bonds, for the breach of the performance of the condition of settling duties, so called, which have accrued, or may accrue, shall remain in this commonwealth, to be enforced, commuted, released, or otherwise disposed of, in such manner as this commonwealth may hereafter determine: provided however, that whatever this commonwealth may hereafter receive or obtain on account thereof if any thing, shall, after deducting all reasonable charges relating thereto, be divided, one third part thereof to the new state, and two third parts thereof to this commonwealth.

Second. All the arms which have been received by this commonwealth from the United States, under the law of congress, entitled, "an act making provisions for arming and equipping the whole body of militia of the United States," passed April the twenty third, one thousand eight hundred and eight, shall, as soon as the said district shall become a separate state, be divided between the two states, in proportion to the returns of the militia, according to which, the said arms have been received from the United States, as aforesaid.

Third. All money, stock or other proceeds, hereafter derived from the United States, on account of the claim of this commonwealth, for disbursements made, and expenses incurred, for the defence of the state, during the late war with Great Britain, shall be received by this commonwealth, and when received, shall be divided between the two states, in the proportion of two thirds to this commonwealth, and one third to the new state.

Fourth. All other property, of every description, belonging to the commonwealth, shall be holden and receivable by the same as a fund and security, for all debts, annuities, and Indian subsidies, or claims due by said commonwealth; and within two years after the said district shall have become a separate state, the commissioners to be appointed, as hereinafter provided, if the said states cannot otherwise agree, shall assign a just portion of the productive property, so held by said commonwealth, as an equivalent and indemnification to said commonwealth, for all such debts, annuities, or Indian subsidies or claims, which may then remain due, or unsatisfied: and all the surplus of the said property, so holden as aforesaid, shall be divided between the said commonwealth and the said district of Maine, in the proportion of two thirds to the said commonwealth, and one third to the said district—and if, in the judgment of the said commissioners, the whole of said property, so held, as a fund and security, shall not be sufficient indemnification for the purpose, the said district shall be liable for and shall pay to said commonwealth one third of the deficiency.

Fifth. The new state shall, as soon as the necessary arrangements can be made for that purpose, assume and perform all the duties and obligations of this commonwealth, towards the Indians within said district of Maine, whether the same arise from treaties, or otherwise; and for this purpose shall obtain the assent of said Indians, and their release to this commonwealth of claims and stipulations arising under the treaty at present existing between the said commonwealth and said Indians; and as an indemnification to such new state, therefor, this commonwealth when such arrangements shall be completed, and the said duties and obligations assumed, shall pay to said new state, the value of thirty thousand dollars, in manner following, viz: the said commissioners shall set off by metes and bounds, so much of any part of the land within the said district, falling to this commonwealth, in the division of the public lands, hereinafter provided for, as in their estimation shall be of the value of thirty thousand dollars; and this commonwealth shall, thereupon, assign the same to the said new state, or in lieu thereof, may pay the sum of thirty thousand dollars at its election; which election of the said commonwealth, shall be made within one year from the time that notice of the doings of the commissioners, on this subject, shall be made known to the governor and council; and if not made within that time, the election shall be with the new state.

Sixth. Commissioners, with the powers and for the purposes mentioned in this act, shall be appointed in manner following: the executive authority of each state shall appoint two; and the four so appointed or the major part of them, shall appoint two more: but if they cannot agree in the appointment, the executive of each state shall appoint one in addition; not however, in that case, to be a citizen of its own state. And any vacancy happening with respect to the commissioners shall be supplied in the manner provided for their original appointment; and, in addition to the powers herein before given to said commissioners, they shall have full power and authority to divide all the public lands within the district, between the respective states, in equal shares, or moieties, in severat ty, having regard to quantity, situation and quality; they shall determine what lands shall be surveyed and divided, from time to time, the expense of which surveys, and of the commissioners, shall be borne equally by the two states. They shall keep fair records of their doings, and of the surveys made by their direction, copies of which records, authenticated by them, shall be deposited from time to time in the archives of the respective states; transcripts of which, properly certified, may be admitted in evidence, in all questions touching the subject to which they relate. The executive authority of each state may revoke the power of either or both its commissioners: having, however, first appointed a substitute, or substitutes, and may fill any vacancy happening with respect to its own commissioners; four of said commissioners shall constitute a quorum, for the transaction of business; their decision shall be final upon all subjects within their cognizance. In case said commission shall expire, the same not having been completed, and either state shall request the renewal or filling up of the same, it shall be renewed or filled up in the same manner, as is herein provided for filling the same, in the first instance, and with the like powers; and if either state shall, after six months' notice, neglect or refuse to appoint its commissioners, the other may fill up the whole commission.

Seventh. All grants of land, franchises, immunities, corporate or other rights, and all contracts for, or grants of land not yet located, which have been or may be made by the said commonwealth, before the separation of said district shall take place, and having or to have effect within the said district, shall continue in full force, after the said district shall become a separate state. But the grant which has been made to the president and trustees of Bowdoin college, out of the tax laid upon the banks within this commonwealth, shall be charged upon the tax upon the banks within the said district of Maine, and paid according to the terms of said grant; and the president and trustees, and the overseers of said college, shall have, hold and enjoy their powers and privileges in all respects; so that the same shall not be subject to be altered, limited, annulled or restrained except by judicial process, according to the principles of law; and in all grants hereafter to be made, by either state, of unlocated land within the said district, the same reservations shall be made for the benefit of schools and of the ministry, as have heretofore been usual, in grants made by this commonwealth. And all lands heretofore granted by this commonwealth, to any religious, literary, or eleemosynary corporation, or society, shall be free from taxation, while the same continues to be owned by such corporation, or society.

Eighth. No laws shall be passed in the proposed state, with regard to taxes, actions, or remedies at law, or bars or limitations thereof, or otherwise making any distinction between the lands and rights of property of proprietors, not resident in, or not citizens of the proposed state, and the lands and rights of property of the citizens of the proposed state, resident therein; and the rights and liabilities of all persons, shall, after the said separation, continue the same as if the said district was still a part of this commonwealth, in all suits pending, or judgments remaining unsatisfied on the fifteenth day of March next, where the suits have been commenced in Massachusetts proper, and process has been served within the district of Maine; or commenced in the district of Maine, and process has been served in Massachusetts proper, either by taking bail, making attachments, arresting and detaining persons, or otherwise, where execution remains to be done; and in such suits the courts within Massachusetts proper, and within the proposed state, shall continue to have the same jurisdiction as if the said district had still remained a part of the commonwealth. And this commonwealth shall have the same remedies within the proposed state, as it now has, for the collection of all taxes, bonds or debts, which may be assessed, due, made, or contracted, by, to, or with the commonwealth, on or before the said fifteenth day of March, within the said district of Maine; and all officers within Massachusetts proper and the district of Maine, shall conduct themselves accordingly.

Ninth. These terms and conditions, as here set forth, when the said district shall become a separate and independent state, shall, ipso facto be incorporated into, and become and be a part of any constitution, provisional or other, under which the government of the said proposed state, shall, at any time hereafter, be administered; subject however, to be modified, or annulled, by the agreement of the legislature of both the said states; but by no other power or body whatsoever.

== See also ==
- List of governors of Maine
- Maine Legislature
- Maine Supreme Judicial Court
- Maine
