= 2018 United States House of Representatives elections in Maine =

- November 6, 2018

All 2 Maine seats to the United States House of Representatives
	Majority party	Minority party
Party	Democratic	Republican
Last election	1	1
Seats won	2	0
Seat change	▲1	▼1
Popular vote	343,635	250,119
Percentage	55.12%	40.12%
Swing	▲3.19%	▼7.89%

Democratic hold Democratic gain
Democratic
40–50%
50–60%
60–70%
Republican
40–50%
50–60%

The 2018 United States House of Representatives elections in Maine were held on November 6, 2018, to elect the two U.S. representatives from the state of Maine, one from each of the state's two congressional districts. The elections coincided with the elections of other offices, including a gubernatorial election, other elections to the House of Representatives, elections to the United States Senate, and various state and local elections.

These U.S. House elections were conducted with ranked-choice voting, as opposed to a simple plurality, after Maine voters passed a citizen referendum approving the change in 2016 and a June 2018 referendum sustaining the change. Ranked-choice voting was used in the primary elections as well.

While Rep. Chellie Pingree in District 1 was reelected with a majority, no candidate received a majority in District 2, which meant that the ranked-choice tabulation needed to occur. Rep. Bruce Poliquin, who received a plurality of first-round votes, filed a federal lawsuit to halt that tabulation, arguing that ranked-choice voting was unconstitutional. The court ruled against Poliquin in his request for a motion on November 15 and against the lawsuit itself on December 13. On November 15, Jared Golden was declared the winner after the ranked-choice redistribution, becoming the first member of Congress to be elected via ranked-choice voting.

== Overview ==
Results of the 2018 United States House of Representatives elections in Maine by district:

District	Democratic		Republican		Others		Total		Result
District	Votes	%	Votes	%	Votes	%	Votes	%	Result
District 1	201,195	58.82%	111,188	32.51%	29,670	8.67%	342,053	100.0%	Democratic hold
District 2	142,440	50.62%	138,931	49.38%	0	0.00%	281,371	100.0%	Democratic gain
Total	343,635	55.12%	250,119	40.12%	29,670	4.76%	623,424	100.0%	

== District 1 ==
2018 Maine's 1st congressional district election
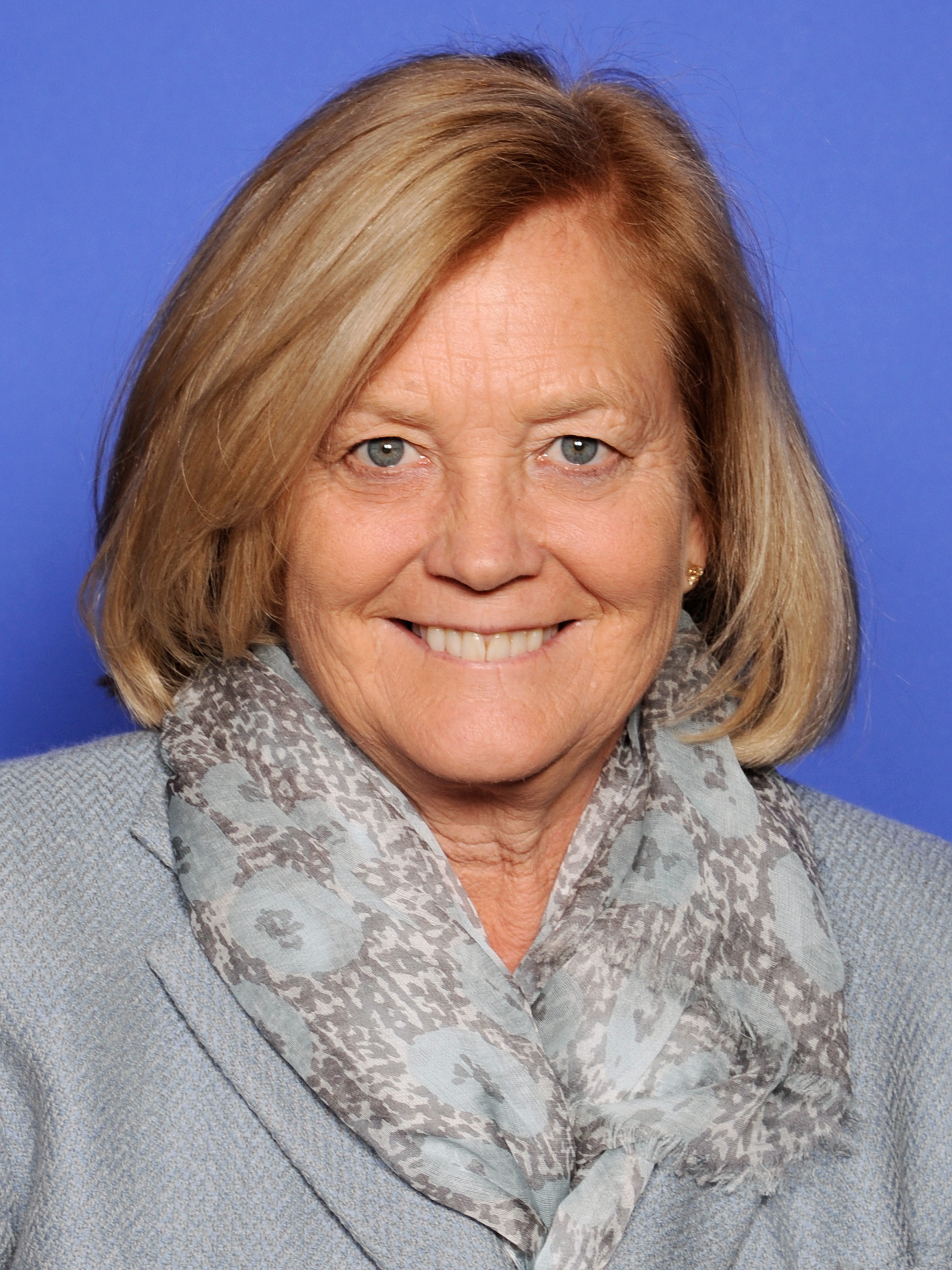

Nominee	Chellie Pingree	Mark Holbrook	Marty Grohman
Party	Democratic	Republican	Independent
Popular vote	201,195	111,188	29,670
Percentage	58.8%	32.5%	8.7%
- County results Pingree: 50–60% 60–70%
U.S. Representative before election
Chellie Pingree
Democratic
Elected U.S. Representative
Chellie Pingree
Democratic

Chellie Pingree, the incumbent representative, was first elected in 2008, and in 2016 defeated Republican nominee Mark Holbrook with just under 58 percent of the vote. Holbrook ran again for the Republican nomination, and was unopposed. Independent State Representative Marty Grohman, elected as a Democrat in the 2016 State House election, defected from the party in 2017. He launched his campaign for the first district in spring 2018.

Due to the use of ranked-choice voting in the election, Pingree was considered to be vulnerable if she did not win outright in the first round, as Grohman could have been a second choice for Republican and Democratic voters. Grohman was receiving substantial support from Republican elected officials and activists, including Republican governor Paul LePage and the state director of President Donald Trump's 2016 presidential campaign Christie-Lee McNally.

=== Democratic primary ===
==== Declared ====
- Chellie Pingree, incumbent U.S. representative

==== Results ====
Democratic primary results
Party	Candidate	Votes	%
Democratic	Chellie Pingree (incumbent)	74,376	100.0
Total votes		74,376	100.0

=== Republican primary ===
==== Declared ====
- Mark Holbrook, professional counselor and 2016 nominee for this seat

==== Results ====
Republican primary results
Party	Candidate	Votes	%
Republican	Mark Holbrook	40,679	100.0
Total votes		40,679	100.0

=== Independents ===
==== Declared ====
- Marty Grohman, state representative

=== Endorsements ===
Chellie Pingree

Local and statewide politicians

- Christopher Babbidge, state representative
- Donna Bailey, state representative
- Pinny Beebe-Center, state representative
- Seth Berry, state representative
- Cathy Breen, state senator
- Jennie Butler, candidate for State House of Representatives
- Justin Chenette, state senator
- Ben Chipman, state senator
- Janice Cooper, state representative
- Diane Denk, member of the Democratic National Committee, candidate for State House of Representatives
- Dale Denno, state representative
- Dave Durrell, candidate for State House of Representatives
- Richard Farnsworth, state representative
- Ryan Fecteau, state representative
- Anne Gass, candidate for State House of Representatives
- Geoffrey Gratwick, state senator
- Henry Ingwersen, candidate for State House of Representatives
- Troy Jackson, state senator, Senate Minority Leader
- Erik Jorgensen, state representative
- Tori Kornfield, state representative
- William Lippincott, candidate for State Senate
- Thomas Longstaff, state representative
- Anne-Marie Mastraccio, state representative
- Chloe Maxmin, candidate for State House of Representatives
- Jay McCreight, state representative
- Andrew McLean, state representative
- Jeremy Mele, candidate for State House of Representatives
- Michele Meyer, candidate for State House of Representatives
- Rebecca Millett, state senator
- David Miramant, state senator
- Kimberly Monaghan, state representative
- Matt Moonen, state representative
- Victoria Morales, candidate for State House of Representatives
- Patricia Nobel, candidate for State House of Representatives
- Jennifer Parker, state representative
- Ann Peoples, former state representative, candidate for State House of Representatives
- Teresa Pierce, state representative
- Lois Galgay Reckitt, state representative
- Tina Riley, state representative
- Tiffany Roberts-Lovell, candidate for State House of Representatives
- Deane Rykerson, state representative
- Heather Sanborn, state representative, candidate for State Senate
- Linda Sanborn, former state representative, candidate for State Senate
- Robert Saucier, candidate for State House of Representatives
- Denise Tepler, state representative
- Maureen Terry, state representative
- Eloise Vitelli, state senator
- Charlotte Warren, state representative

Organizations

- Alliance for Retired Americans
- End Citizens United
- EqualityMaine
- Human Rights Campaign
- Planned Parenthood
- Sierra Club

Trade unions

- AFL-CIO
- Laborers' International Union of North America
- Maine State Council of Machinists
- Maine State Employees Association

Media

- Bangor Daily News
- Kennebec Journal
- Portland Phoenix
- Portland Press Herald
Mark Holbrook

Individuals

- Daniel Davey, former Knox County Sheriff
- Carly Fiorina, candidate for president of the United States in 2016 US presidential election, candidate for US Senate from California in 2010
- Paula G. Sutton, candidate for State House of Representatives

Organizations

- Christian Civic League of Maine
- Gun Owners of Maine
- National Right to Life Committee
- NRA Political Victory Fund
Marty Grohman

Local and statewide politicians

- Linda Baker, former state senator (R-Topsham)
- Kerri Bickford, former state representative (R-Topsham)
- Joe Bruno, former state representative and former House Minority Leader (R-Raymond)
- Pamela Cahill, former state representative, former state senator, former Senate Minority Leader, (R-Woolwich) Republican candidate for governor of Maine in 1994 former chair of the Maine Republican Party
- Alan Casavant, mayor of Biddeford, former state representative (Democrat)
- Mark Ellis, former chair of the Maine Republican Party
- Karen Gerrish, state representative (R-Lebanon)
- Jon Kinney, state representative (R-Limington)
- Brian Langley, state senator (R-Ellsworth)
- Paul LePage, incumbent governor of Maine (Republican)
- Don Marean, state representative (R-Hollis)
- Les Otten, Republican candidate for Governor of Maine in 2010
- Tony Payne, former Maine Republican Party Executive Director
- David Rollins, mayor of Augusta (Democrat)
- Tom Saviello, state senator (R-Farmington)
- Mary Small, former state representative, former state senator, former Senate Minority Leader (R-Bath)
- Ande Smith, Republican candidate for this seat in 2016
- Meredith Strang Burgess, former state representative (R-Cumberland)
- Karen Vachon, state representative (R-Scarborough)
- Amy Volk, state senator, Majority Whip (R-Scarborough)
- Nathan Wadsworth, state representative (R-Hiram)
- Mark Walker, mayor of Hallowell (Republican)
- Karl Ward, state representative (R-Dedham)
- David Woodsome, state senator (R-Waterboro)

Individuals

- Ben Gilman, John McCain presidential campaign, 2008 Maine state director, former staffer for Olympia Snowe
- Christie-Lee McNally, Donald Trump presidential campaign, 2016 Maine state director
- Ray Richardson, right-wing talk radio host

Organizations

- Sportsman's Alliance of Maine
- Unite America
- US Chamber of Commerce

=== General election ===
==== Predictions ====
Source	Ranking	As of
The Cook Political Report	Safe D	November 5, 2018
Inside Elections	Safe D	November 5, 2018
Sabato's Crystal Ball	Safe D	November 5, 2018
RCP	Safe D	November 5, 2018
Daily Kos	Safe D	November 5, 2018
538	Safe D	November 7, 2018
CNN	Safe D	October 31, 2018
Politico	Safe D	November 2, 2018

==== Forum & debate ====
2018 Maine's 1st congressional district candidate forum & debate
No.	Date	Host	Moderator	Link	Democratic	Republican	Independent
Key: P Participant A Absent N Not invited I Invited W Withdrawn							
Key: P Participant A Absent N Not invited I Invited W Withdrawn					Chellie Pingree	Mark Holbrook	Marty Grohman
1	Oct. 22, 2018	WCSH	Pat Callaghan		P	P	P
2	Nov. 2, 2018	Maine Public Television	Jennifer Rooks	WETA	P	P	P

==== Polling ====
Poll source	Date(s) administered	Sample size	Margin of error	Chellie Pingree (D)	Mark Holbrook (R)	Marty Grohman (I)	Other	Undecided
Emerson College	October 27–29, 2018	442	± 4.9%	56%	31%	–	7%	6%
Pan Atlantic Research	October 1–7, 2018	249	–	53%	29%	11%	–	7%

==== Results ====
Maine's 1st congressional district, 2018
Party	Candidate	Votes	%
Democratic	Chellie Pingree (incumbent)	201,195	58.8
Republican	Mark Holbrook	111,188	32.5
Independent	Marty Grohman	29,670	8.7
Total votes		342,053	100.0
Democratic hold			

== District 2 ==
2018 Maine's 2nd congressional district election
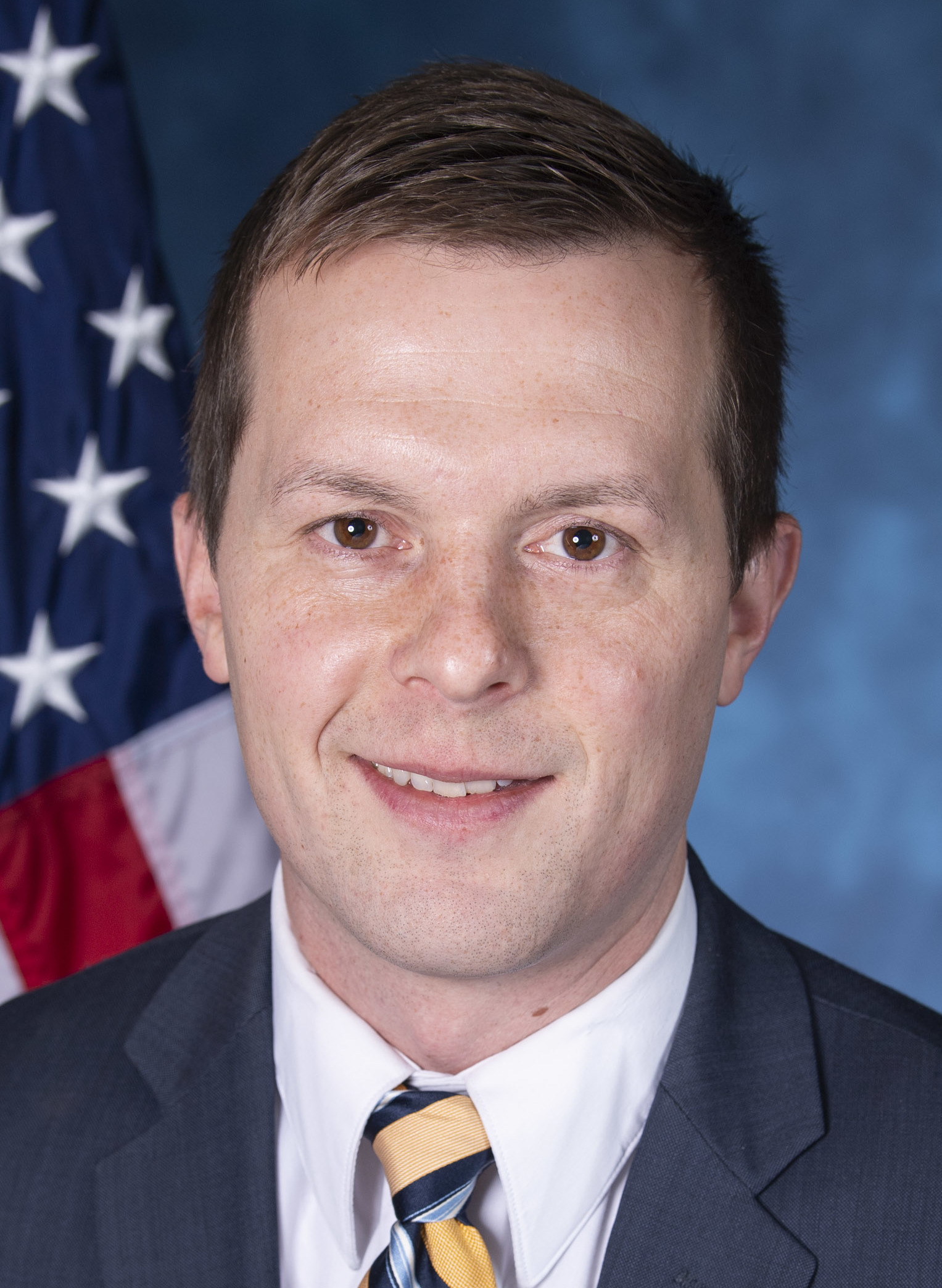

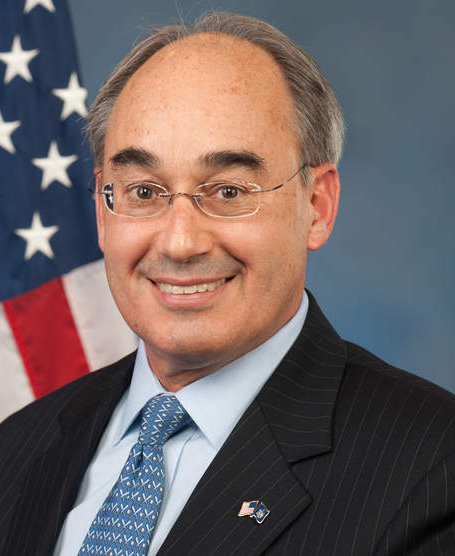

Nominee	Jared Golden	Bruce Poliquin	Tiffany Bond
Party	Democratic	Republican	Independent
First round	132,013; 45.58%	134,184; 46.33%	16,552; 5.71%
Maximum round	142,440; 50.62%	138,931; 49.38%	Eliminated
- Golden: 40%–50% 50%–60% 60–70% 70–80% 80–90% >90% Poliquin: 40%–50% 50%–60% 60–70% 70–80% 80–90% >90% Tie: No votes
U.S. Representative before election
Bruce Poliquin
Republican
Elected U.S. Representative
Jared Golden
Democratic

Bruce Poliquin, the incumbent representative for the second district, defeated Democrat Emily Cain in the 2016 election in a rematch of the 2014 election where Poliquin was first elected. Poliquin ran for the Republican nomination unopposed. Cain did not challenge Poliquin again, instead taking a job with the progressive group Emily's List. Initially, six candidates filed for the Democratic nomination — United States Postal Service employee and activist Phil Cleaves, carpenter and former Maine State Senate candidate Jonathan Fulford, Assistant Majority Leader of the State House of Representatives Jared Golden, shopkeeper and former chair of the Isleboro Board of Selectmen Craig Olson, businessman and former State Senate candidate Tim Rich, and conservationist Lucas St. Clair. Cleaves, Rich and Fulford dropped out at various points in the campaign, though Fulford's withdrawal happened too late for his name to be removed from the primary ballot. Several candidates received prominent endorsements; St. Clair was endorsed by the League of Conservation Voters and California Congressman Jared Huffman, Fulford by the left-wing group Our Revolution prior to his withdrawal from the race, and Golden by VoteVets, Massachusetts Congressman Seth Moulton and over two dozen members of the Maine Legislature. Golden defeated St. Clair and Olson in the second round of the ranked-choice vote tabulation.

In addition, two third-party candidates announced their candidacies for the seat: Houlton Band of Maliseets State Representative Henry John Bear of the Maine Green Independent Party and Brian Kresge of the Libertarian Party. Bear, a former Democrat, left the party due to its stance on water rights for Maine's native people. He failed to qualify for the ballot. Kresge, a veteran and writer, withdrew from the race to run for a seat in the State House of Representatives. Neither the Libertarians nor Green Independents had a candidate on the ballot.

Two independent candidates qualified for the ballot: Tiffany Bond, an attorney from Portland (a city outside of the second district), and Will Hoar, a schoolteacher.

=== Republican primary ===
==== Declared ====
- Bruce Poliquin, incumbent U.S. representative

==== Results ====
Republican primary results
Party	Candidate	Votes	%
Republican	Bruce Poliquin (incumbent)	43,047	100.0
Total votes		43,047	100.0

=== Democratic primary ===
==== Candidates ====
===== Declared =====
- Jared Golden, Assistant Majority Leader of the Maine House of Representatives
- Craig Olson, former chair of the Islesboro Board of Selectmen
- Lucas St. Clair, conservationist, restaurateur, and son of Roxanne Quimby

===== Withdrawn =====
- Phil Cleaves, United States Postal Service employee
- Jonathan Fulford, farmer, carpenter, and two-time Maine Senate candidate
- Tim Rich, businessman

===== Declined =====
- Troy Jackson, Minority Leader of the Maine Senate and candidate for this seat in 2014
- Ben Sprague, Bangor City Councilor

==== Endorsements ====
Jonathan Fulford (withdrawn)

Individuals

- Ben Chin, Democratic nominee for mayor of Lewiston, 2015 and 2017

Organizations

- Our Revolution
Jared Golden

State and local politicians

- Robert Alley, State Representative
- Betty Austin, state representative
- Heidi Brooks, state representative
- Barbara Cardone, state representative
- Michael E. Carpenter, State Senator and former Maine Attorney General
- Robert Duchesne, state representative
- Michelle Dunphy, state representative
- Jessica L. Fay, state representative
- Aaron Frey, state representative
- Roger Fuller, state representative
- Sara Gideon, Speaker of the Maine House of Representatives
- Gay Grant, state representative
- James R. Handy, state representative
- Brian Hubbell, state representative
- Victoria Kornfield, state representative
- Walter Kumiega, state representative
- Nate Libby, state senator
- Louis Luchini, state representative
- Colleen Madigan, state representative
- John Madigan, state representative
- Danny Martin, state representative
- John L. Martin, state representative, former Speaker of the Maine House of Representatives
- David McCrea, state representative
- Gina Melaragno, state representative
- Catherine Nadeau, state representative
- Anne Perry, state representative
- Christina "Tina" Riley, state representative
- John Schneck, state representative
- Bettyann Sheats, state representative
- Stephen Stanley, state representative
- Ryan Tipping, state representative
- Stanley Paige Zeigler, state representative

Individuals

- Amy Fried, political scientist
- Seth Moulton, U.S. representative (D–MA)

Local Democratic organizations

- Androscoggin County Democratic Party
- Lewiston Democratic Party

National organizations

- American Association for Justice
- Committee for an Effective Congress
- Common Defense
- Congressional Progressive Caucus
- End Citizens United
- VoteVets.org
- Tech Solidarity

Local and statewide organizations

- Maine People's Alliance

Trade unions

- BMDA, Local 3999, United Auto Workers
- IAM Local S7 Shipyard Communicator
- International Association of Fire Fighters
- International Association of Machinists and Aerospace Workers
- International Brotherhood of Electrical Workers Local 2327
- Maine AFL-CIO
- Maine State Council of Machinists
- Maine Trial Lawyers Association
- National Nurses United
- Professional Firefighters of Maine
- United Steelworkers District 4
Lucas St. Clair

Individuals

- Jared Huffman, congressman for California's 2nd congressional district
- Tim Rich, businessman, former candidate for ME-02 in 2018

Organizations

- League of Conservation Voters

Newspapers

- Bangor Daily News

==== Polling ====
Poll source	Date(s) administered	Sample size	Margin of error	RCV round	Jonathan Fulford	Jared Golden	Craig Olson	Lucas St. Clair	Other	Undecided
Survey USA (with RCV)	April 26 – May 1, 2018	217 LV	± 7.2%	Round 1	17%	22%	5%	25%	–	31%
Survey USA (with RCV)	April 26 – May 1, 2018	217 LV	± 7.2%	Round 2	27%	35%	–	38%	–	
Survey USA (with RCV)	April 26 – May 1, 2018	217 LV	± 7.2%	Round 3	–	49%	–	51%	–	
Global Strategy Group	October 2–5, 2017	300	± 5.7%	N/A	–	8%	–	40%	7%	45%

==== Fundraising ====
(through March 31, 2017)

- Jared Golden: $618,380.33
- Lucas St. Clair: $424,958.42
- Jonathan Fulford (withdrawn): $166,989.79
- Craig Olson: $100,299.00
- Tim Rich (withdrawn): $72,197.20
- Emily Cain (not running): $24,692.88

==== Debates ====
2018 Maine's 2nd congressional district democratic primary debates
No.	Date	Host	Moderator	Link	Democratic	Democratic	Democratic
Key: P Participant A Absent N Not invited I Invited W Withdrawn							
Key: P Participant A Absent N Not invited I Invited W Withdrawn					Jared Golden	Craig Olson	Lucas St. Clair
1	Jun. 6, 2018	WABI-TV; WAGM-TV; WMTW (TV)	Meghan Torjussen		P	P	P
2	Jun. 9, 2018	Maine Public Television	Jennifer Rooks	WETA	P	P	P

==== Results ====
Democratic primary results
Party	Candidate	Round 1			Round 2		
Party	Candidate	Votes	%	Transfer	Votes	% (gross)	% (net)
Democratic	Jared Golden	20,987	46.4%	+2,624	23,611	52.2%	54.3%
Democratic	Lucas St. Clair	17,742	39.2%	+2,111	19,853	43.9%	45.7%
Democratic	Craig Olson	3,993	8.8%	-3,993	Eliminated		
Democratic	Jonathan Fulford	2,489	5.5%	-2,489	Eliminated		
Total active votes		45,211	100%		43,464		100.0%
Exhausted ballots		–		+1,747	1,747	3.9%	
Total votes		45,211	100%		45,211	100.0%	

% (gross) = percent of all valid votes cast (without eliminating the exhausted votes)
% (net) = percent of votes cast after eliminating the exhausted votes

=== Green primary ===
==== Failed to make the ballot ====
- Henry John Bear, state representative for Houlton Band of Maliseet Indians

=== Libertarian primary ===
==== Withdrawn ====
- Brian Kresge, writer (running for State House)

=== Independent candidates ===
- Tiffany Bond, attorney
- Will Hoar, schoolteacher

=== General election ===
All candidates except for Poliquin said they would abide by the results of ranked-choice voting and make second and third choices when they vote. Poliquin said he would only cast a first-round vote for himself, stating that he felt no one but him is qualified for the seat.

Though Poliquin led in the first round of vote tabulation by 2,171 votes, he did not have a majority of the votes, initiating the ranked-choice tabulation process. Poliquin filed a lawsuit in federal court on November 13, seeking an order to halt the second-round tabulation of ballots and declare ranked-choice voting unconstitutional. Poliquin's request for an injunction to halt the ranked-choice voting process was rejected, shortly before Matthew Dunlap, the Maine Secretary of State, announced Golden as the winner by 3,509 votes after votes for independent candidates Tiffany Bond and Will Hoar were eliminated and ballots with these votes had their second- or third-choice votes counted.

Poliquin requested a recount of the ballots just before the deadline of November 26. After several days of counting with the result not being significantly changed, Poliquin ended the recount after incurring $15,000 in fees. Poliquin also stated that his lawsuit would continue and asked Judge Lance Walker, the federal judge hearing his lawsuit, to order a new election be held should he decline to hold ranked-choice voting unconstitutional. Judge Walker ruled against Poliquin on the merits on December 13, rejecting all of his arguments.

Poliquin appealed to the Court of Appeals in Boston and requested an order to prevent Golden from being certified as the winner, but that request was rejected. On December 24, Poliquin dropped his lawsuit, allowing Golden to take the seat. As a result, Poliquin became the first incumbent to lose the 2nd Congressional District since 1916, whereas Golden became the first member of Congress to be elected via ranked-choice voting. This also made New England's delegation to the House entirely Democratic for the first time since 2012.

Gov. Paul LePage, as one of his last acts in office, reluctantly initialed the certificate of election for Golden, adding the words "stolen election" to it to express his personal dislike of ranked-choice voting. Golden was re-elected to a third term in 2022 in a rematch with Poliquin.

==== Endorsements ====
Jared Golden

National politicians

- Joe Biden, former vice president of the United States
- Seth Moulton, representative for Massachusetts's 6th Congressional district
- Barack Obama, former president of the United States
- Brian Schatz, U.S. senator (D-HI)

Local and statewide politicians

- Robert Alley, state representative
- Betty Austin, state representative
- Heidi Brooks, state representative
- Barbara Cardone, state representative
- Michael E. Carpenter, state senator and former Maine attorney general
- Robert Duchesne, state representative
- Michelle Dunphy, state representative
- Jessica L. Fay, state representative
- Aaron Frey, state representative
- Roger Fuller, state representative
- Sara Gideon, Speaker of the Maine House of Representatives
- Gay Grant, state representative
- James R. Handy, state representative
- Brian Hubbell, state representative
- Victoria Kornfield, state representative
- Walter Kumiega, state representative
- Nate Libby, state senator
- Louis Luchini, state representative
- Colleen Madigan, state representative
- John Madigan, state representative
- Danny Martin, state representative
- John L. Martin, state representative, former Speaker of the Maine House of Representatives
- David McCrea, state representative
- Gina Melaragno, state representative
- Catherine Nadeau, state representative
- Anne Perry, state representative
- Christina "Tina" Riley, state representative
- Tom Saviello, state senator (Republican)
- John Schneck, state representative
- Bettyann Sheats, state representative
- Stephen Stanley, state representative
- Ryan Tipping, state representative
- Stanley Paige Zeigler, state representative

Individuals

- Amy Fried, political scientist
- Stephen King, author
- Martin Sheen, actor

Trade unions

- International Association of Fire Fighters
- International Brotherhood of Electrical Workers
- Maine AFL-CIO
- National Nurses United
- Professional Firefighters of Maine
- United Steelworkers

Organizations

- End Citizens United
- League of Conservation Voters
- Maine People's Alliance
- MoveOn.org
- Sierra Club
- VoteVets

Media

- Bangor Daily News
- Kennebec Journal
- Portland Phoenix
- Portland Press Herald
Bruce Poliquin

National politicians

- Donald Trump, 45th president of the United States

Local and statewide politicians

- Susan Collins, US senator (R-ME)

Organizations

- America First Action
- NRA Political Victory Fund
- Sportsman's Alliance of Maine
- US Chamber of Commerce

==== Polling ====
Poll source	Date(s) administered	Sample size	Margin of error	RCV round	Bruce Poliquin (R)	Jared Golden (D)	Tiffany Bond (I)	Will Hoar (I)	Other	Undecided
Emerson College	October 27–29, 2018	441	± 4.9%	–	46%	47%	–	–	3%	4%
NYT Upshot/Siena College	October 15–18, 2018	501	± 4.8%	–	41%	41%	–	–	–	15%
Global Strategy Group (D)	October 9–12, 2018	400	± 4.9%	–	42%	48%	–	–	–	10%
Pan Atlantic Research	October 1–7, 2018	251	–	–	37%	37%	6%	3%	–	17%
NYT Upshot/Siena College	September 12–14, 2018	506	± 4.8%	–	47%	42%	–	–	–	11%
The Mellman Group (D-Golden)	September 4–7, 2018	–	± 4.9%	–	46%	54%	–	–	–	–
The Mellman Group (D-Golden)	July 25–30, 2018	400	± 4.9%	Round 1	40%	39%	3%	1%	–	16%
The Mellman Group (D-Golden)	July 25–30, 2018	400	± 4.9%	Round 2	48%	48%	4%	–	–	–
The Mellman Group (D-Golden)	July 25–30, 2018	400	± 4.9%	Round 3	49%	51%	–	–	–	–

Hypothetical polling

Poll source	Date(s) administered	Sample size	Margin of error	Bruce Poliquin (R)	Lucas St. Clair (D)	Other	Undecided
Global Strategy Group	October 2–5, 2017	400	± 4.9%	44%	41%	—	—

Poll source	Date(s) administered	Sample size	Margin of error	Bruce Poliquin (R)	Generic Democrat	Other	Undecided
PPP/Patriot Majority USA	February 12–13, 2018	628	± 3.9%	44%	45%	–	11%
PPP/Patriot Majority USA	October 5–8, 2017	951	± 3.2%	44%	45%	–	11%

==== Predictions ====
Source	Ranking	As of
The Cook Political Report	Tossup	October 3, 2018
Inside Elections	Tossup	September 28, 2018
Sabato's Crystal Ball	Lean D (flip)	November 5, 2018
Daily Kos	Tossup	September 28, 2018
Fox News	Tossup	September 21, 2018
CNN	Tossup	October 2, 2018
RealClearPolitics	Tossup	September 21, 2018
The New York Times	Tossup	September 26, 2018
Politico	Tossup	September 21, 2018

==== Debate ====
2018 Maine's 2nd congressional district debate
No.	Date	Host	Moderator	Link	Republican	Democratic	Independent	Independent
Key: P Participant A Absent N Not invited I Invited W Withdrawn								
Key: P Participant A Absent N Not invited I Invited W Withdrawn					Bruce Poliquin	Jared Golden	Tiffany Bond	Will Hoar
1	Oct. 16, 2018	WABI-TV; WAGM-TV; WMTW-TV			P	P	P	P
2	Nov. 2, 2018	News Center Maine			P	P	P	P

==== Results ====
Maine's 2nd congressional district, 2018 results
Party	Candidate	Round 1			Round 2		
Party	Candidate	Votes	%	Transfer	Votes	% (gross)	% (net)
Democratic	Jared Golden	132,013	45.58%	+ 10,427	142,440	49.18%	50.62%
Republican	Bruce Poliquin (incumbent)	134,184	46.33%	+ 4,747	138,931	47.97%	49.38%
Independent	Tiffany Bond	16,552	5.71%	16,552	Eliminated		
Independent	Will Hoar	6,875	2.37%	6,875	Eliminated		
Total active votes		289,624	100%		281,371		100.00%
Exhausted ballots		–		+8,253	8,253	2.85%	
Total votes		289,624	100%		289,624	100%	
Democratic gain from Republican							

% (gross) = percent of all valid votes cast (without eliminating the exhausted votes)
% (net) = percent of votes cast after eliminating the exhausted votes

Poliquin led on first preferences with 46.4% to Golden's 45.6% and 8.1% for the two independents. However, as no candidate had a majority of the votes, the votes cast for the two independents were redistributed between Poliquin and Golden (those that didn't give a preference for either of the candidates were exhausted) and Golden won the election. The reason both independents were eliminated in a single round, as opposed to only the 4th place candidate, was because of the mathematical impossibility of the 3rd place candidate moving into 2nd place even if they had received all of the 4th place candidate's redistributed votes.

Of the votes left in the count, Golden won with 50.62% of the vote to Poliquin's 49.38%. Including exhausted votes, the final count was Golden 49.2%, Poliquin 48.0%, and 2.8% exhausted.

The votes for the two independents were redistributed as follows: 44.5% went to Golden, 20.3% went to Poliquin, and 35.2% were exhausted votes (i.e., they didn't give a preference to either of the remaining candidates).

== See also ==
- 2018 United States House of Representatives elections
