= 2016 Maine referendums =

Five referendums were held in Maine, United States on November 8, 2016 alongside state and national elections. All are citizen-initiated proposals, which cover:

- Legalization of marijuana: Proposed legalization of the recreational use of marijuana in the state for those over the age of 21, and institution a 10 percent tax on its sale.
- Education funding: A proposal to increase state aid to public schools by instituting a surcharge of 3% on state income taxes for those with income above $200,000 a year.
- Background checks: A proposal to require background checks for virtually all gun transfers in the state, with some exceptions.
- State minimum wage: A proposed increase in Maine's minimum wage from $7.50 per hour to $12 an hour by 2020, as well as increasing the minimum wage for tipped employees gradually to the same level by 2024.
- Voting reforms: Changing the state voting system from plurality voting to ranked choice voting (also known as instant runoff voting).

This number of questions is the most to appear on a single election's ballot in Maine history, exceeding two occasions when four questions were on the ballot.
