= Roberta Beavers =

American politician (born 1942)

Roberta B. Beavers

Member of the Maine House of Representatives
- In office December 2010 – December 2016

Personal details
- Born: May 6, 1942 (age 84) Shelton, Washington, U.S.
- Party: Democratic
- Education: Rutgers University; Lehigh University; Montclair State University

Roberta 'Bobbi' B. Beavers (born May 6, 1942) is an American politician from Maine. Beavers, a Democrat from South Berwick, Maine, served in the Maine House of Representatives from December 2010 until December 2016.
