= James J. Campbell =

American politician

James J. Campbell Sr. is an American politician from Maine. Campbell is a former unenrolled (independent) member of the Maine House of Representatives from Newfield, Maine in York County. He first served from 2003 to 2010 in the Maine House as a Republican. He went on to serve from December 2012 until December 2016.

In 2015, Campbell sponsored L.D. 167 which banned municipalities from holding referendums on marijuana legalization. In 2013, Portland voters voted to legalize marijuana with 68% of the vote and in 2014, South Portland, York and Lewiston held referendums on similar ordinances. The bill died before the State Senate.

Formerly a Biddeford, Maine resident, Campbell served on the Biddeford City Council from 1976 to 1992.

Campbell earned a B.A. from the University of Maine and a M.A. in American and New England Studies from the University of Southern Maine.
