= Andrea Boland =

American politician (born 1947)

Member of the Maine House of Representatives
- In office 2006–2014
- Constituency: District 142

Personal details
- Born: February 12, 1947 (age 79) Boston, Massachusetts
- Party: Democratic
- Education: Elmira College, Northwestern University.

Andrea Boland (born February 12, 1947) is an American politician from Maine. A Democrat, Boland represented Sanford, Maine in the Maine House of Representatives.

Boland endorsed the Marianne Williamson 2020 presidential campaign in the 2020 United States presidential election.
