= Kerri Bickford =

American politician

Member of the Maine House of Representatives
- In office 2006–2012
- Constituency: District 60

Personal details
- Party: Democratic

Kerri L. Bickford is an American politician from Maine. She served in the Maine House of Representatives.

Bickford is a member of the planning board in Topsham, Maine.
