= Janice Cooper =

American politician

Janice E. Cooper

Member of the Maine House of Representatives from the 47th district
- In office December 2014 – December 2, 2020
- Preceded by: Redistricted
- Succeeded by: Arthur L. Bell

Member of the Maine House of Representatives from the 107th district
- In office December 5, 2012 – December 2014
- Preceded by: Melissa Walsh Innes
- Succeeded by: Redistricted

Personal details
- Party: Democratic
- Education: Vassar College; Yale Law School

Janice E. Cooper is an American politician from Maine. Cooper, a Democrat from Yarmouth, Maine, has served in the Maine House of Representatives since December 2012.
