= Popular referendum =

Referendum to repeal a new or existing law

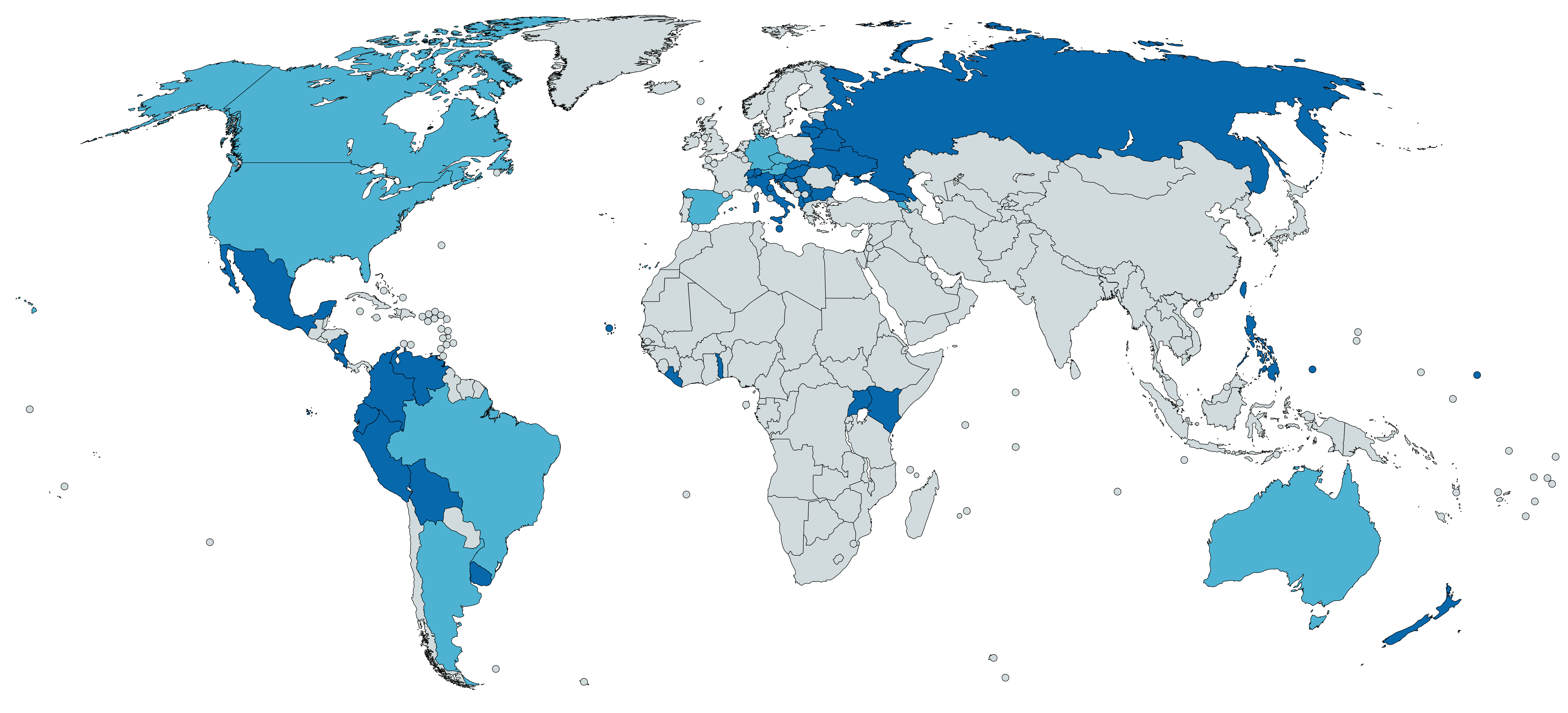
Popular referendum: Available on national level Available on subnational level only

A popular referendum, depending on jurisdiction also known as a citizens' veto, people's veto, veto referendum, citizen referendum, abrogative referendum, rejective referendum, suspensive referendum, and statute referendum, is a type of a referendum that provides a means by which a petition signed by a certain minimum number of registered voters can force a public vote (plebiscite) on an existing statute, constitutional amendment, charter amendment, or ordinance; in its minimal form, it simply obliges the executive or legislative bodies to consider the subject by submitting it to the order of the day. It is a form of direct democracy.

Unlike a popular initiative or legislative referendum that allows voters to suggest new legislation, a popular referendum allows them to suggest repealing existing legislation. As with an initiative, a popular referendum is held after a given number of signatures supporting it have been submitted to the authorities; in some cases, such a referendum may also be initiated by regional authorities. Depending on local legislation, the popular referendum may be implemented only in a short window of time after the legislation has been passed; in others it may be used to defeat any existing legislation. Specific details on the applicable procedure such as the number of signatures, whether there is a time limit and its duration on when the popular referendum may be passed, and the body to which they must be submitted vary from country to country, and in the United States from state to state.

Supporters of the popular referendum point out that it is a safeguard against special interests taking over, and protects the rights of minorities. Critics point out that popular referendums have a higher voter turnout by people who have strong feelings about the issue at hand, and as such, it empowers special interests.

== Worldwide implementation ==
=== Europe ===
Thirty countries allow for referendum initiated by the population on the national level In Europe the popular referendum (commonly known as abrogative referendum) was first introduced in Switzerland in St. Gallen canton in 1831, and was introduced to the whole country known as the optional referendum. It now exists in Albania, Denmark (since 1953), Italy (since 1970), Malta, Russia and Switzerland (since 1874).

In 1975, the United Kingdom held its first EU membership referendum, where 67.2% voted to remain in the European Economic Community, reaffirming the UK’s place in Europe.

In 2005, France held a referendum on the proposed European Constitution, which was rejected by 54.7% of voters, significantly impacting the EU’s plans for deeper integration.

In 2014, Scotland held an independence referendum, with 55.3% voting to remain part of the United Kingdom, maintaining the union between Scotland and the rest of the UK.

=== Latin America ===
In 1988, Chile held a national plebiscite where voters rejected extending General Augusto Pinochet's rule for another eight years, paving the way for democratic elections and ending the dictatorship.

In 1999, Venezuela held a constitutional referendum under President Hugo Chávez, resulting in the approval of a new constitution that expanded presidential powers and altered the political structure of the country.

In 2016, Colombia held a peace agreement referendum aimed at ending decades of conflict with FARC guerrillas. The agreement was narrowly rejected, leading to further negotiations.

In 2019, Cuba held a constitutional referendum that adopted a new constitution recognizing private property and introducing presidential term limits, marking significant shifts in its socialist framework.

=== United States ===
In the United States, such a process exists, as of May 2009, in 23 states and one territory: Alaska, Arizona, Arkansas, California, Colorado, Idaho, Maine, Maryland, Massachusetts, Michigan, Missouri, Montana, Nebraska, Nevada, New Mexico, North Dakota, Ohio, Oklahoma, Oregon, South Dakota, Utah, Washington, Wisconsin, Wyoming and the U.S. Virgin Islands. The popular referendum was first introduced in the United States by South Dakota in 1898, and first used in the United States in 1906, in Oregon, two years after the initiative was used (in 1904, also in Oregon).

=== Africa ===
In 1992, South Africa held a historic referendum in which white voters supported ending apartheid, paving the way for democratic reforms and multiracial governance in the country.

In 2011, South Sudan held a historic independence referendum where an overwhelming majority voted for secession from Sudan, leading to the creation of the Republic of South Sudan as a sovereign nation.

In 2015, Rwanda held a constitutional referendum that allowed President Paul Kagame to potentially remain in power until 2034, raising debates about the balance between stability and democratic principles.

In 2023, the Central African Republic held a referendum on constitutional changes potentially allowing President Faustin-Archange Touadéra to extend his time in office, a move that raised concerns about democratic backsliding.

== See also ==
- Initiative
- Legislative referral
- Recall election
