= Murder of Matthew Rairdon =

2013 murder-suicide in Maine, U.S.

- Undated photo of Matthew Rairdon
- Location: Westbrook, Maine, United States
- Date: November 30, 2013; 12 years ago
- Attack type: Murder by shooting; Murder–suicide
- Deaths: 2 (Rairdon and Milliner)
- Victims: Matthew Rairdon, aged 22
- Perpetrator: Patrick Milliner
- Motive: Anger following rupture

The murder of Matthew Steven Rairdon (July 17, 1991 – November 30, 2013), a 22-year-old emergency nurse, occurred in Westbrook, Maine, in the early hours of Saturday, November 30, 2013, when Rairdon was shot and killed by his former boyfriend, 30-year-old Patrick Milliner, who then killed himself. The killing brought local attention to the issue of domestic violence in same-sex relationships, with police and Maine's Family Crisis Services stressing the dangers resulting from the end of a relationship regardless of sexual orientation. Following Rairdon's death, a spokesperson for Maine's social services urged to report signs of violence or extreme anger in any person involved in a break-up.

== Background ==
=== Matthew Rairdon and Patrick Milliner ===
A native of Westbrook, Rairdon was born in a family of seven children and was a graduate of Westbrook High School. In 2009, he enrolled in Saint Joseph's College in Standish, Maine, where he pursued a career in nursing. Before getting his certification as a nurse, Rairdon had been active in theater since his times at Westbrook High School, where he had taken part in the drama club's plays. Rairdon also worked for a local bakery in Westbrook and was a well known and appreciated young man. His father, Gary Rairdon, is a local politician in Westbrook who won a seat to the city's council the same month of Matthew's death, in November 2013.

Shortly before his murder, Rairdon had become an emergency nurse in the Northern Light Mercy Hospital in Portland, Maine. Weeks before his death, he had been instrumental in saving the life of a 91-year-old woman who suffered heart complications. The woman's son-in-law recalled how Rairdon's actions probably prevented the woman's death and added that he and his mother-in-law were surprised at his "cool as a cucumber" response to the emergency, while making the elderly woman feel comfortable when doctors arrived to help.

Maine State Police believe that Rairdon and Milliner worked together during the EqualityMaine campaign to legalize same-sex marriage in Maine in December 2012, although none of Milliner's last Facebook posts before the murder stated when or how they had met.

Milliner was born in Hesperia, California, and graduated from Hesperia High School in 2001. Opposite to Rairdon, he had nearly no connection to his family, writing in his last post on Facebook hours before killing Rairdon, that his family reacted poorly when he came out as gay, and that only his mother finally accepted him over the years. In 2008, Milliner became active in the campaign opposing Proposition 8 in California, which was intended to pass a state constitutional amendment to ban same-sex marriage in California. As part of his involvement in the campaign, Milliner visited 49 high school gay–straight alliance groups in the state, encouraging students to talk to their parents about the issue. He was also active in the Democratic Party political action committee known as ActBlue.

In 2009, Milliner left California and settled in Colorado. An athletic man, Milliner joined the Colorado Rush Rugby Football Club, a rugby union club in the Denver metropolitan area with a focus on promoting competitive tournaments for gay men in the sport. Milliner held short-time jobs as a security guard, becoming interested in relocating to Maine during his first visit to the state in 2009. That same year, the Maine Legislature passed a veto to a law signed by Governor John Baldacci approving same-sex marriage in Maine. In 2012, as campaigns increased in the state for a referendum to repeal the veto, Milliner decided that he would move to Maine. He finally moved and settled in Portland in June 2013.

== Relationship and murder of Rairdon ==
It is unclear when or how Milliner and Rairdon became engaged in a relationship, but they were already together by September 2013, with Milliner posting on Facebook that one of his "favorite memories in Maine so far" was watching family videos with "his family", adding "Still smiling ― with Matt Rairdon." After the killing, acquaintances and friends of both men confirmed that the two had an on-and-off relationship, with frequent break-ups and reconciliations in the few months that they knew each other.

In Maine, Milliner became a correctional guard at the Maine Correctional Center in Windham and enrolled at the Criminal Justice Academy in Vassalboro, beginning classes to become a state corrections officer. Rairdon, meanwhile, had become specialized in emergency nursing and had joined the staff of the Northern Light Mercy Hospital in Portland.

The final break-up between both men came in November 2013 following mistrust from Milliner, who suspected that Rairdon was having an affair. After their separation, Rairdon deleted the pictures he had with Milliner on his Facebook profile and removed him as a friend on the social app. This, according to a friend of Milliner, deeply upset and angered him. Hours before murdering Rairdon, Milliner posted a 1,900-word publication, expressing that he was "in a dark place again" and detailing past psychological struggles, though he warned that "this time is the last time." Police said that while Milliner did not include explicit threats of violence in the post, he showed frustration at having to keep looking for the "man of [his] dreams" and suggesting that he may harm himself, saying he prayed to be "free of pain" in case there was a life after death.

Around 2 a.m. on Saturday, November 30, 2013, Rairdon was ambushed and murdered at the entrance of his home at 318 Main St. in Westbrook, as he returned from work. Clad in black winter clothes, Milliner approached Rairdon and shot him repeatedly in the head and chest with a .40 caliber Glock pistol, killing him. Milliner subsequently shot himself in the head. Rairdon's female roommate found the bodies the next morning at around 11 a.m. and alerted the police. Both Rairdon and Milliner were pronounced dead at the scene.

== Investigation and aftermath ==
Stephen McCausland, spokesman for the Department of Public Safety, confirmed that Milliner had ambushed Rairdon, having probably "been there waiting for Rairdon to return home." McCausland also said that Milliner left a note on the crime scene which was "similar in tone" to his last Facebook post. On December 2, McCausland affirmed that the murder was being treated as an incident of domestic violence. Police confirmed too that Milliner had purchased the handgun the day prior at a Cabela's in Scarborough, Maine.

One of Milliner's friends provided the Portland Press Herald with a copy of Milliner's last writing, where he described in detail his mental struggles with dark thoughts and how angry he was at the breakup with Rairdon, as well as at having spent Thanksgiving alone. In 2017, following the murder of a woman, her son, and a neighbor, at the hands of the woman's husband in Madison, Maine, Matthew's mother Laurie was interviewed by WCSH. Laurie recalled how "persistent" Milliner was about reaching out to her son, but assured that "[Matthew] didn't live in fear. He wasn't afraid [of Milliner]. But ultimately, afraid or not, this person couldn't let go."

Colleen Hilton, the mayor of Westbrook, expressed shock and sadness at Rairdon's murder, saying that it was a "senseless tragedy" and referring to Rairdon as a "great kid." She added that the Rairdons are "well known in the community" and that she personally knew Matthew's family for years. Matthew's father, who was due to take office for the Westbrook City Council, was granted a stay by Hilton, allowing him to assume his position later.

Milliner's body was returned to California, where a funeral was held for him at a local church in Victorville on December 10, 2013.

Lois Galgay Reckitt, of the Family Crisis Services in Portland, Maine, said that the murder of Rairdon should be "an eye-opener", citing statistics that prove that members of the LGBTQ+ community often do not feel comfortable reporting incidents of domestic violence, especially gay men. Reckitt added that warning signs are visible in nearly all cases of domestic violence and that a "trained eye" sees patterns in the aggressors, urging anyone under conditions of violence at the hands of a partner to seek help. Julia Colpitts of the Maine Coalition to End Domestic Violence said that the breakup of a relationship is "more dangerous than what you might think", saying that if one of the parts involved in the breakup is suicidal, they should be taken seriously, especially if the "suicidal piece and relationship end come together."

Both Reckitt and Colpitts praised police's response to the investigation in relation to the respectful handling in light of a same-sex relationship, with Reckitt saying that he had seen "no snickering" and that it "had not always been this way."

On December 6, 2013, the National Coalition of Anti-Violence Programs released a statement addressing the issue of violence between partners of the same-sex, presenting Rairdon's murder as an example.

Following Rairdon's death, his family and friends created a 5k race every year, funding a scholarship for students at Rairdon's alma mater at St Joseph's College. In June 2020, amid the COVID-19 pandemic in Maine, Rairdon's former manager at Mercy Hospital and his mother pushed for the annual race to be held with the aim of promoting a scholarship at Westbrook High School for students wanting to go into nursing school.
