= Senator Speer =

Senator Speer may refer to:

- J. G. Speer (1820–1893), Florida State Senate
- Thomas J. Speer (1837–1872), Georgia State Senate

== See also ==
- Jackie Speier (born 1950), California State Senate
- Jerrold Speers (born 1941), Maine State Senate
- Senator Spear (disambiguation)
