= Dillon Bates =

American politician, coach, and educator

Member of the Maine House of Representatives from the 35th district
- In office December 3, 2014 – August 20, 2018
- Preceded by: Ann Peoples
- Succeeded by: Ann Peoples

Personal details
- Born: May 15, 1988 (age 38) Winterport, Maine, U.S.
- Party: Democratic
- Education: University of Maine (BA)

Dillon Bates (born May 15, 1988) is an American politician, coach, and educator who served as a member of the Maine House of Representatives from 2014 to until his resignation in August 2018.

== Early life and education ==
Bates is a native of Winterport, Maine, and attended Hampden Academy. He earned a Bachelor of Arts degree in political science and theatre from the University of Maine, where he participated in sports.

== Career ==
Bates was a delegate to the 2008 and 2012 Maine Democratic Party Conventions. He interned on Congressman Mike Michaud's 2010 reelection campaign. Bates worked as a drama teacher at The Maine Girls' Academy and track coach at Massabesic High School. In 2012, Bates unsuccessfully sought the Democratic nomination for District 118 in the Maine House of Representatives, which includes the West End neighborhood of Portland, Maine. He was defeated by Matt Moonen. After the election, Bates moved to downtown Westbrook. In 2014, Bates won election to the Maine House of Representatives to succeed Ann Peoples.

=== Anonymous allegations of sexual misconduct ===
On August 3, 2018, an anonymously-written magazine article alleged that Bates had engaged in three sexual relationships with underage students while working as a teacher and coach. House Speaker Sara Gideon and then-Chair of the Maine Democratic Party, Phil Bartlett, called on Bates to resign. Bates denied all allegations. On August 20, 2018, Bates resigned from his seat in the Maine House of Representatives. The following month, the Maine Department of Education denied Bates's request to renew his teaching credential.

Bates has not been charged with a crime.
