= William O'Gara =

American politician (1931–2024)

Member of the Maine Senate from the 30th district
- In office 1997–2003
- Preceded by: Donald Esty, Jr. (D)
- Succeeded by: Carolyn Gilman (R)

Personal details
- Born: December 6, 1931 Westbrook, Maine, U.S.
- Died: November 5, 2024 (aged 92) Westbrook, Maine, U.S.
- Party: Democrat
- Profession: Schoolteacher

William B. O'Gara (December 6, 1931 – November 5, 2024) was an American schoolteacher and politician from Maine. O'Gara, a Democrat, served in the Maine House of Representatives from 1985 to 1997 and in the Maine Senate from 1997 to 2003, representing his residence in Westbrook, Maine, and nearby areas of Cumberland County.

== Life and career ==
O'Gara was born in Westbrook, Maine, on December 6, 1931. He earned a B.A. from Springfield College (1958) and an A.A. from Portland Junior College (1955). He taught and coached at Waynflete School (Portland) and Mahoney Middle School (South Portland) from 1957 to 1980.

In 2002, he was defeated for re-election by Republican Carolyn Gilman. From 1974 to 1984, O'Gara served as Mayor of Westbrook.

O'Gara died at his home in Westbrook on November 5, 2024, at the age of 92.

== See also ==
- List of mayors of Westbrook, Maine
