= Senator Esty =

Senator Esty may refer to:

- Constantine C. Esty (1824–1912), Massachusetts State Senate
- Donald Esty Jr. (fl. 1980s–2010s), Maine State Senate
- Edward S. Esty (1824–1890), New York State Senate
