= Old Westbrook High School =

- Westbrook High School
- U.S. National Register of Historic Places
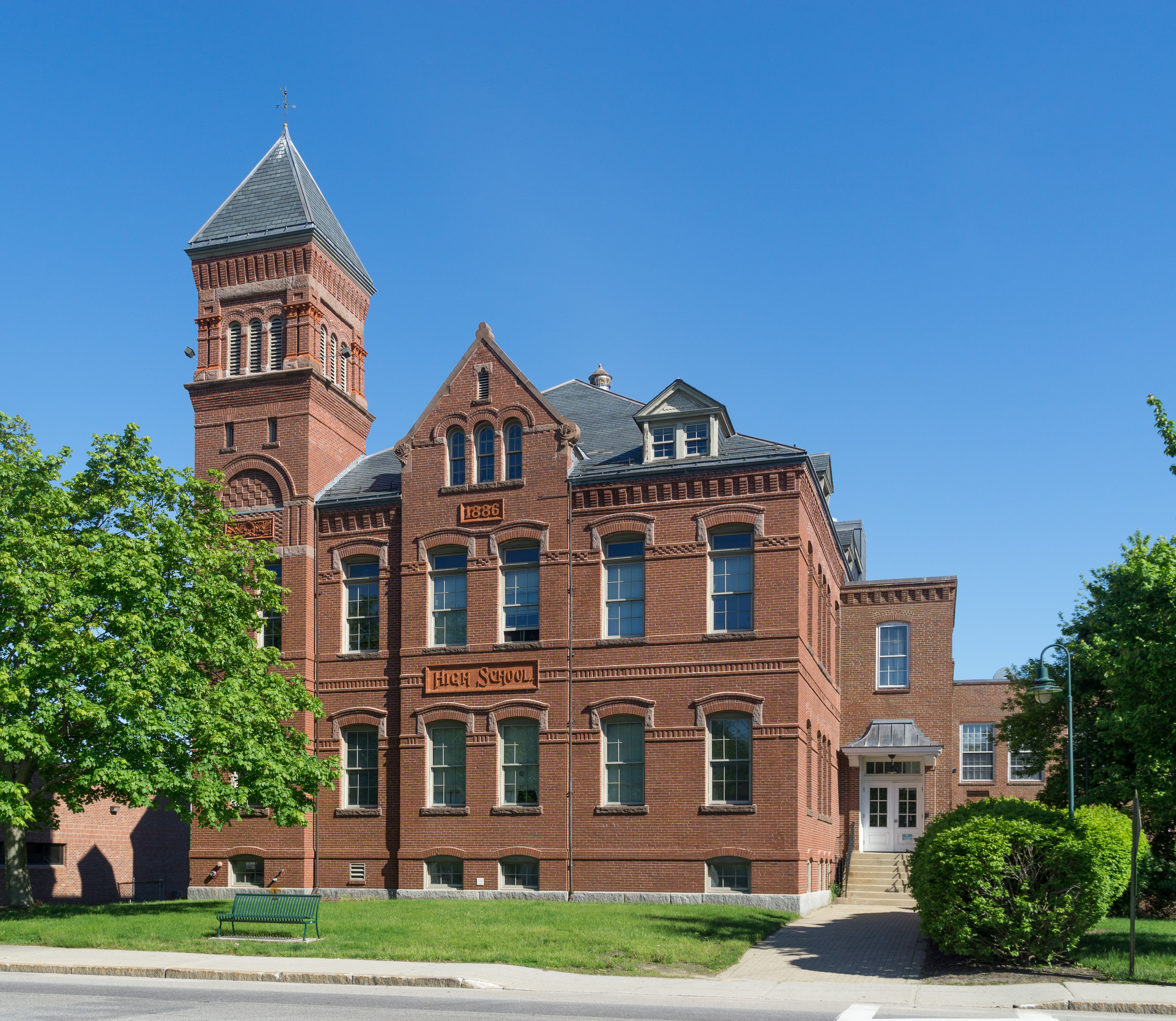

- Location within Maine Location within the United States
- Location: 765 Main St., Westbrook, Maine
- Coordinates: 43°40′36″N 70°21′46″W
- Area: 0.5 acres (0.20 ha)
- Built: 1886
- Architect: Fassett & Tompson; Frederick A. Tompson; Miller & Beal, Inc.
- Architectural style: Queen Anne, Romanesque
- NRHP reference No.: 79000146
- Added to NRHP: November 27, 1979

The Old Westbrook High School is a historic school building at 765 Main Street in central Westbrook, Maine. Built in 1886, it is one of the city's most architecturally sophisticated 19th-century buildings, designed by the Portland firm of Fassett & Tompson. Now converted to senior housing, it was listed on the National Register of Historic Places in 1979.

== Description and history ==
The Old Westbrook High School building is located on the east side of the city's downtown, just east of the post office on the north side of Main Street. Its main section is a large 2 1/2-story masonry structure, built out of red brick with brownstone trim, and covered with a hip roof. A 20th-century two-story addition, also in brick, is attached to its rear, and extends to the right, giving the structure an overall L shape. The front of the building is six bays wide, with a four-story tower at the leftmost bay. Most windows are set in segmented-arch openings with brick headers and stone ears, and there are beltcourses of raised stonework between the windows just below the ears, and between the floors. It has a shallow cornice with corbelled brickwork, and a slightly projecting two-bay section which rises to a gable housing three narrow round-arch windows.

The school was designed by Fassett & Tompson, and was completed in 1886. It was built on the site of a wood-frame elementary school, and included elementary grades when it first opened. Part of the rear addition was built in 1912, its cost donated by the daughter of mill owner S. D. Warren. A second extension to the building's left, also designed by Frederick A. Tompson, was added in 1913 but razed in 1976 to make way for the post office. The extension of the rear eastward to Foster Street was added in 1936, designed by Miller & Beal, Inc.

The school served as a high school until 1956, when the present high school was put into service. It was then used as a junior high school until it was finally closed in 1975. The gymnasium and related facilities served as headquarters for the Westbrook Recreation Department for several decades until relocation to the Westbrook Community Center. Much of the rest of the building sat vacant until it was eventually rehabilitated and converted for use as senior housing.

== See also ==
- National Register of Historic Places listings in Cumberland County, Maine
