= Senator Gilman (disambiguation) =

Nicholas Gilman (1755–1814) was a U.S. Senator from New Hampshire from 1805 to 1814. Senator Gilman may also refer to:

- Carolyn Gilman (born 1939), Maine State Senate
- Charles A. Gilman (1833–1927), Minnesota State Senate
- Don Gilman (1934–2005), Alaska State Senate
- Joseph Gilman (1738–1806), New Hampshire State Senate
