= Rufus King Jordan =

American politician and industrialist

Rufus King Jordan (November 28, 1863 - 26 Apr 1942) was an American politician and industrialist from Maine. A Democrat, Jordan was Mayor of Westbrook, Maine from 1905 to 1906. He also served two terms in the Maine House of Representatives.

== Personal ==
Jordan was born and raised in Westbrook, where he received a preliminary education at local public schools. He dropped out of school and was employed by L.S. Stevenson, where he learned civil engineering. After six years with Stevenson, Jordan purchased a foundry from G.H. Raymond.

== See also ==
- List of mayors of Westbrook, Maine
