= Miller & Beal, Inc. =

Miller & Beal, Inc., was a prominent architectural firm based in Portland, Maine, established in 1929. It was the successor to Miller, Mayo & Beal. Architect Lester I. Beal led the office.

== History ==
The office was established in 1929, as Miller & Beal, when Raymond J. Mayo withdrew from the firm of Miller, Mayo & Beal. Lester Beal had worked for Mayo and William R. Miller since 1906, when the firm was based in Lewiston. The senior partner, William Miller, died on December 14, 1929, but Beal continued the office as Miller & Beal, Inc.

In the late 1950s Beal added Joseph DePeter and Ernest F. Spaulding as partners, with the firm becoming known as Beal, DePeter, Spaulding. He retired soon afterward, in 1960. After his 1966 death, the firm became Beal, DePeter, Ward with Edwin Corrigan Ward.

== Architectural works ==
=== Miller & Beal, 1929 ===
- 1929 - Edward Little High School, 30 Academy St, Auburn, Maine

=== Miller & Beal, Inc., 1929-1950s ===
- 1929 - Curtis Hall, North Yarmouth Academy, North Yarmouth, Maine
- 1930 - Weld Free Public Library, 25 Church St, Weld, Maine
- 1931 - Forster Memorial Building, 14 S Main St, Strong, Maine
- 1932 - Cape Elizabeth High School (former), 14 Scott Dyer Rd, Cape Elizabeth, Maine
- 1934 - Tewksbury Center School, 139 Pleasant St, Tewksbury, Massachusetts
- 1936 - Frank I. Brown School, 37 Highland Ave, South Portland, Maine
- 1936 - Westbrook High School (addition), 765 Main St, Westbrook, Maine
- 1937 - Wells High School (former), 1470 Post Rd, Wells, Maine
- 1938 - Kennebunk High School, 89 Fletcher St, Kennebunk, Maine
- 1938 - Saco Fire Station, 14 Thornton Ave, Saco, Maine
- 1941 - Newport Armory (former), 81 North St, Newport, Maine
- 1942 - Central Fire Station, 684 Broadway, South Portland, Maine
- 1944 - Redbank Village, Macarthur Cir E, South Portland, Maine
  - In association with Desmond & Lord.
- 1949 - Henry Wadsworth Longfellow School, 432 Stevens Ave, Portland, Maine
- 1950 - South Portland High School, 637 Highland Ave, South Portland, Maine
- 1952 - Boothbay Region High School, 236 Townsend Ave, Boothbay Harbor, Maine
- 1953 - Burton M. Cross State Office Building, 111 Sewall St, Augusta, Maine
  - With Desmond & Lord.

=== Beal, DePeter, Spaulding, 1950s-1966 ===
- 1963 - Chancery Building, 510 Ocean Ave, Portland, Maine
- 1964 - Windham High School, 406 Gray Rd, Windham, Maine

=== Beal, DePeter, Spaulding, from 1966 ===
- 1967 - Dexter Regional High School, 12 Abbott Hill Rd, Dexter, Maine
- 1969 - Lake Region High School, 1877 Roosevelt Tr, Naples, Maine
- 1975 - Boothbay Region Elementary School, 238 Townsend Ave, Boothbay Harbor, Maine

== Gallery ==
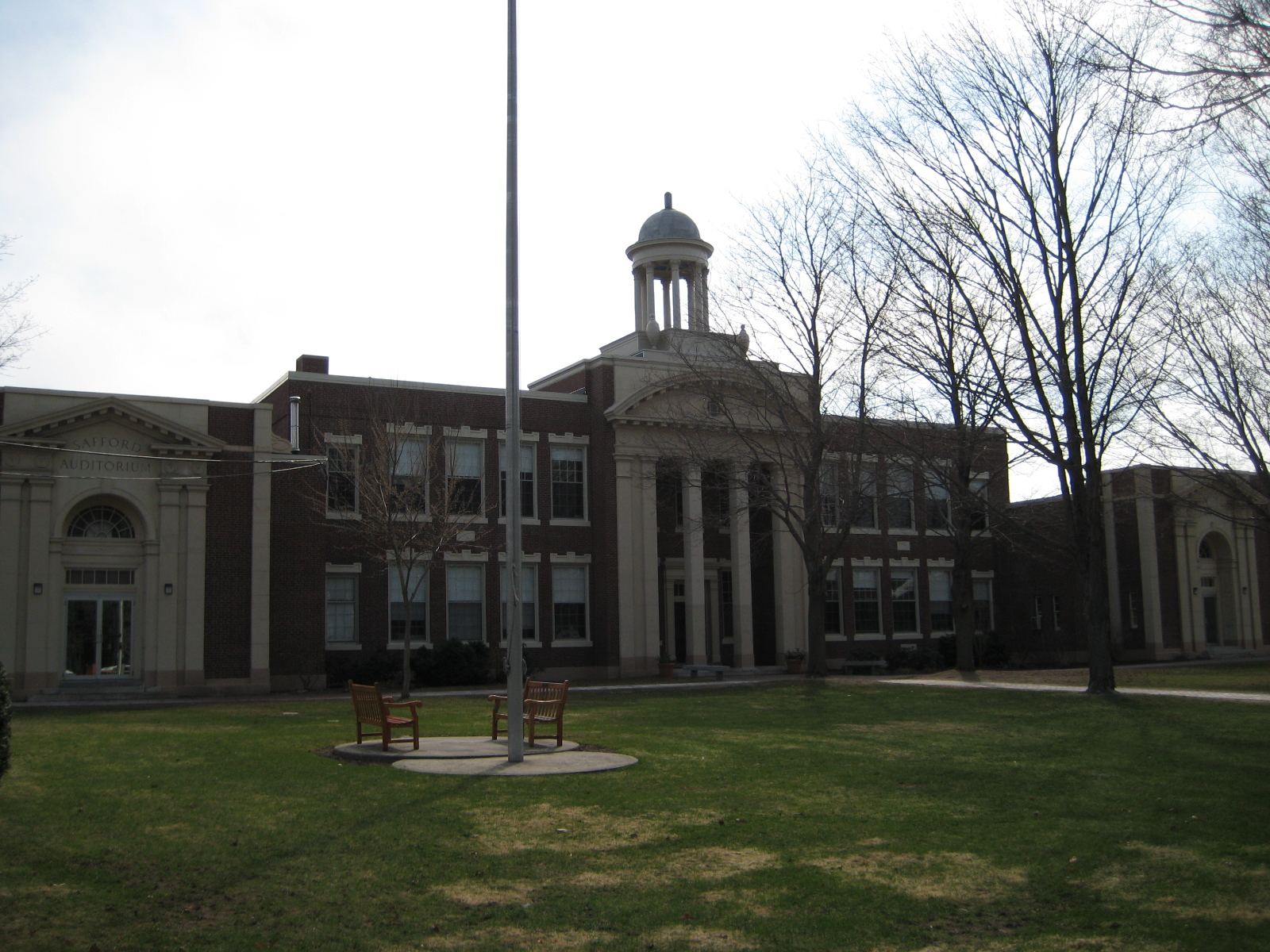
Academy, North Yarmouth, 1929.

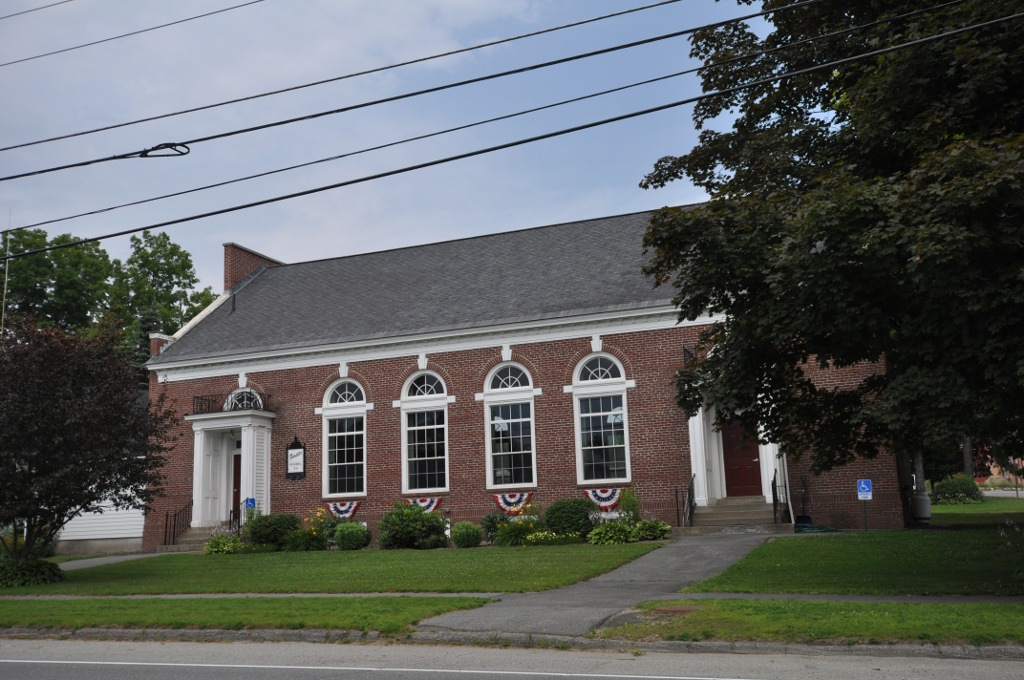
Forster Memorial, Strong, 1931.

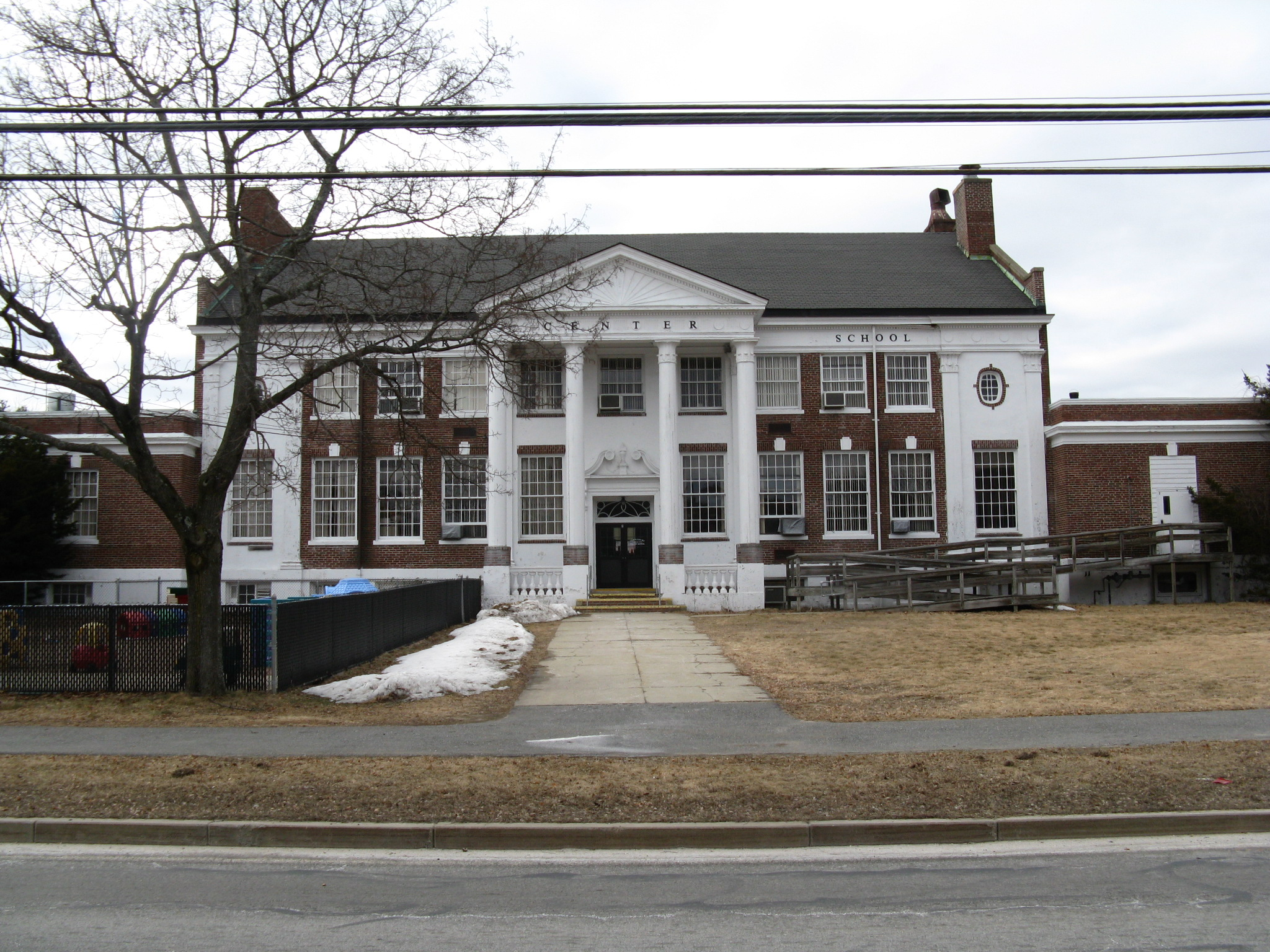
Center School, Tewksbury, 1934.

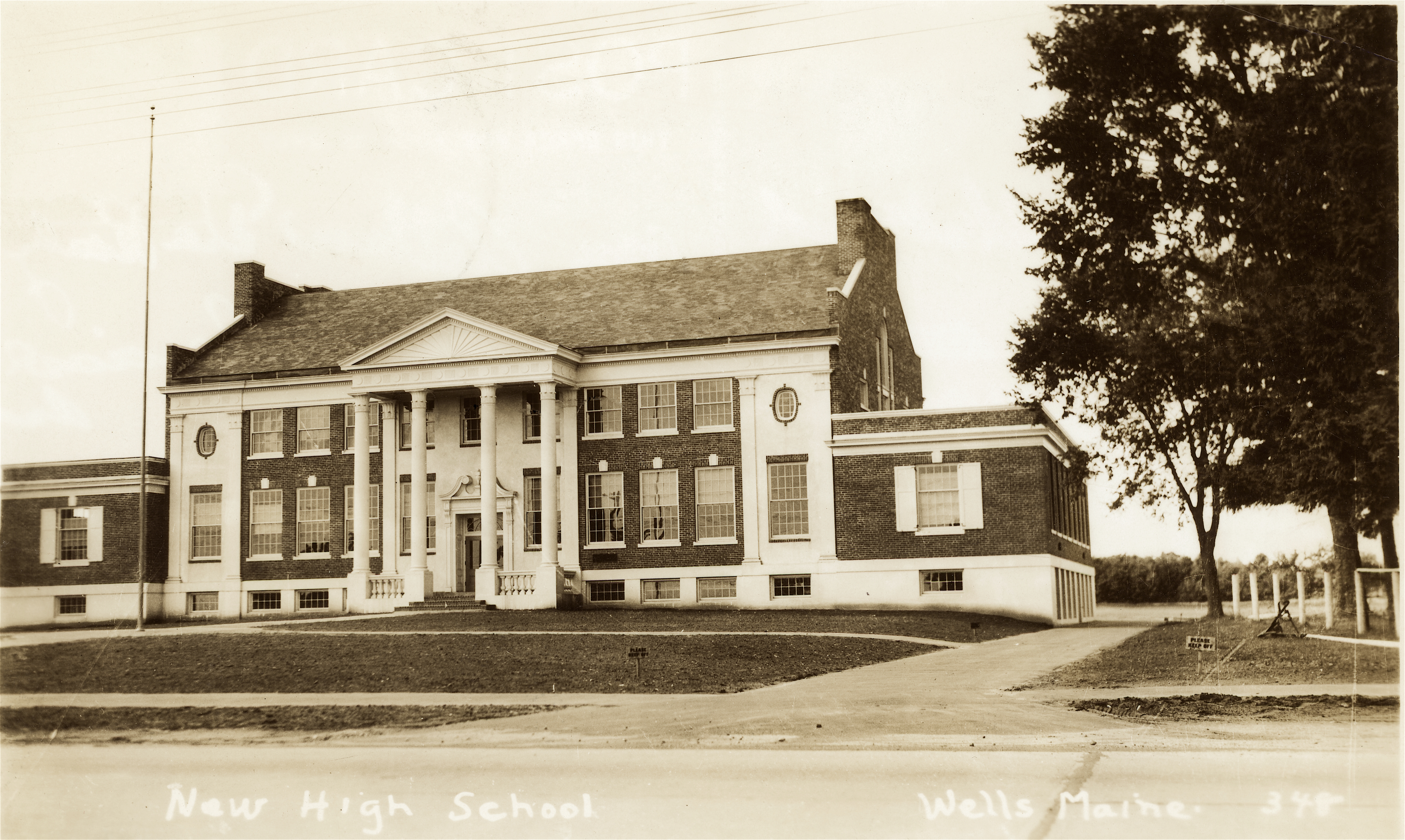
Wells High School, Wells, 1937.

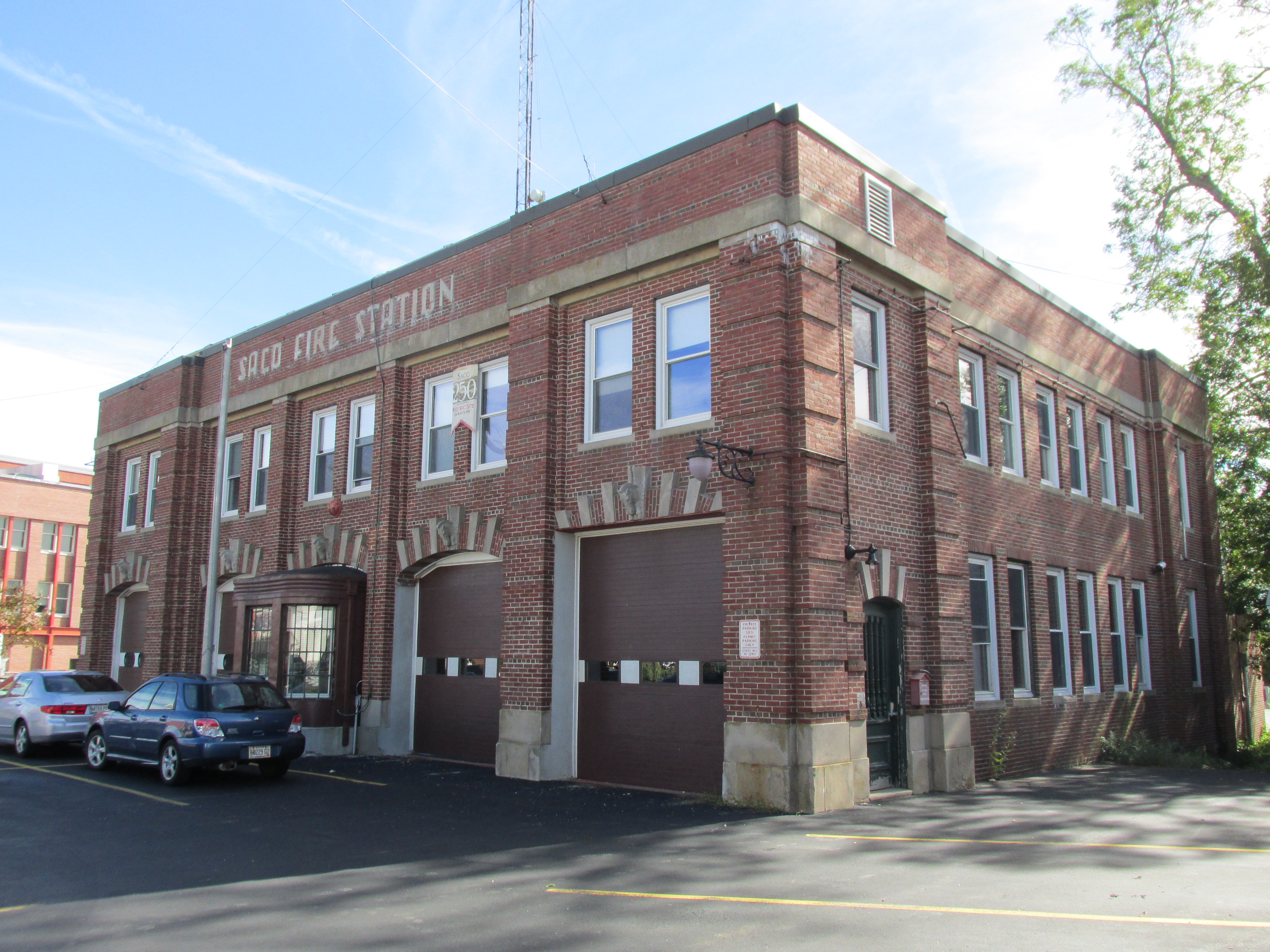
Saco Fire Station, Saco, 1938.

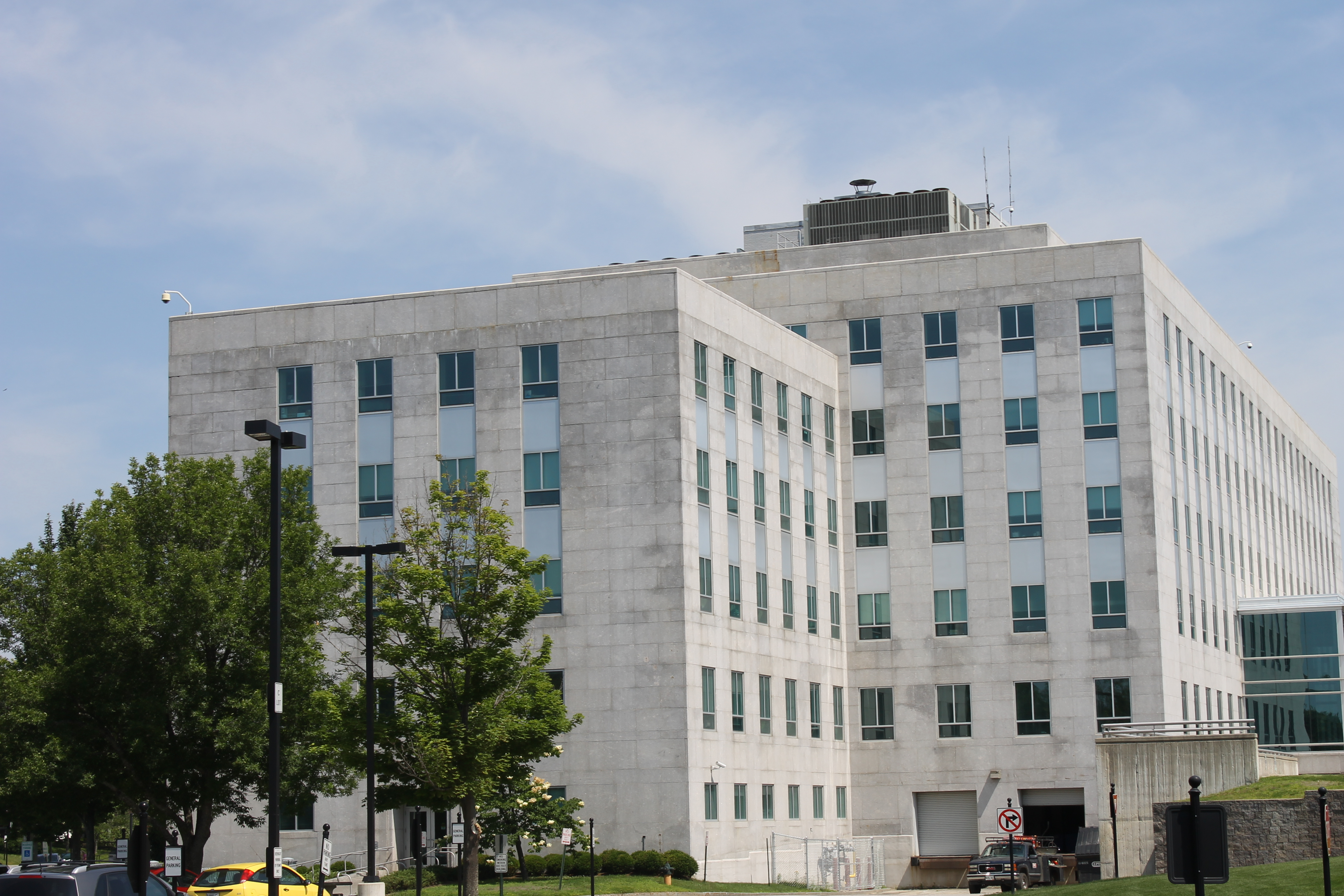
State Office Building, Augusta, 1953.

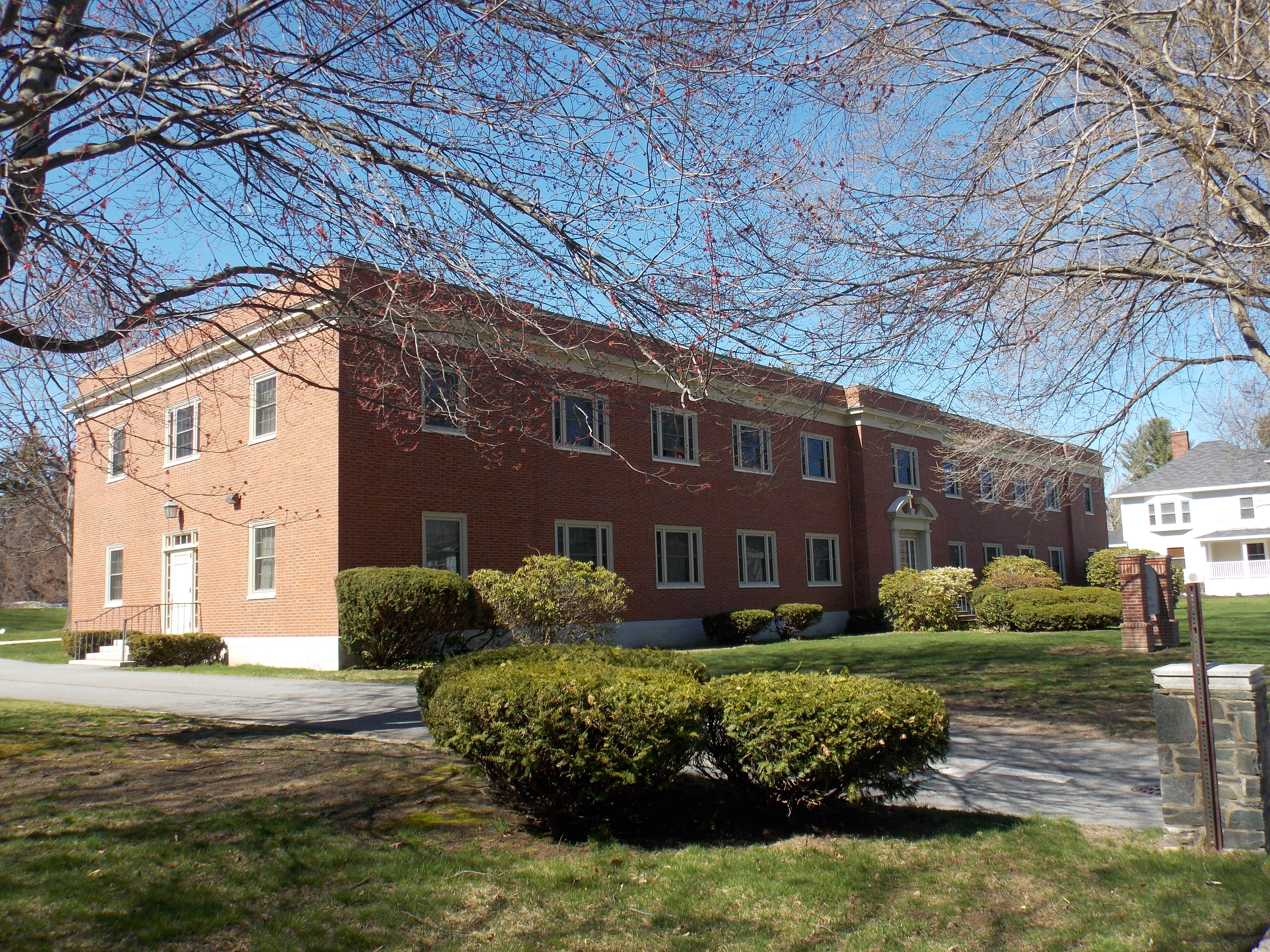
Chancery Building, Portland, 1963.
