= Philip E. Curran =

American banker and politician

Philip E. Curran (May 1, 1927 – March 23, 2018) was an American banker and politician from Maine. Curran worked for Casco Bank and Trust Company for 39 years, including as manager of several of the company's branch offices. A Republican residing in Westbrook, Maine, Curran was elected to the Maine House of Representatives in 1986 and re-elected two years later.
