= Senator Spear =

Senator Spear may refer to:

- Albert Spear (1852–1929), Maine State Senate
- Allan Spear (1937–2008), Minnesota State Senate

== See also ==
- Jae Spears (1923–2013), West Virginia State Senate
- Alexander Speirs (Maine politician) (1859–1927), Maine State Senate
- Senator Speer (disambiguation)
