= Phil Bartlett =

American lawyer and politician

Chair of the Maine Democratic Party
- In office November 17, 2014 – January 13, 2019
- Preceded by: Ben Grant
- Succeeded by: Kathleen Marra

Member of the Maine Senate from the 6th district
- In office December 1, 2004 – December 5, 2012
- Preceded by: Carolyn Gilman
- Succeeded by: James Boyle

Personal details
- Born: Philip Lester Bartlett II; September 24, 1976 (age 49) Portland, Maine, U.S.
- Party: Democratic
- Education: Tufts University (BA); Harvard University (JD)
- Website: Official website

Philip Lester Bartlett II (born September 24, 1976) is an American lawyer and politician from Maine. A Democrat, he served in the Maine Senate from 2004 to 2012, representing the 6th district (Scarborough, Westbrook and his hometown of Gorham). In 2014, Bartlett was elected Chairman of the Maine Democratic Party.

As of 2026, Bartlett is the chairman of the Maine Public Utilities Commission. He was first nominated as chair in 2019 and re-nominated in 2025.

== Early life and career ==
Raised in Gorham, Bartlett attended Gorham public schools, graduating from Gorham High School in 1994. He was an active boy scout throughout his youth, attaining the rank of Eagle Scout. On leaving high school, he went to Tufts University, majoring in economics and political science. Following Tufts, he attended Harvard Law School, where he earned a J.D. and served as president of the Harvard Journal on Legislation.

Admitted to practice law in Maine and Massachusetts, he spent the year following his law school graduation clerking for Leigh Saufley, chief justice of the Maine Supreme Judicial Court. He is today a lawyer specializing in workers' compensation with the firm of Scaccia, Lenkowski, Aranson & Bartlett in Sanford, Maine.

== In politics ==
In 2004, at the age of 28, Bartlett ran for the Maine Senate in the 6th district. He won the Democratic primary election held on June 8, 2004, taking 59% of the vote against Gorham resident Edward Needham. In the general election held on November 2, he faced incumbent Sen. Carolyn Gilman, a Republican from Westbrook, defeating her by 53% to 47% – a margin of 1,168 votes. He won re-election in 2006, 2008 and 2010.

Bartlett served as senate majority leader in the 124th Legislature (2009–10), losing the position following the 2010 election that saw Republicans take back the senate majority. Term limits prevented him from seeking a fifth term in 2012.

Bartlett was elected to a four-year term on the Democratic National Committee at the Maine Democratic Party Convention on June 2, 2012.

Party political offices
Preceded by Ben Grant	Chair of the Maine Democratic Party; 2014–2019	Succeeded by Kathleen Marra
