= Saco Central Fire Station =

- U.S. National Register of Historic Places
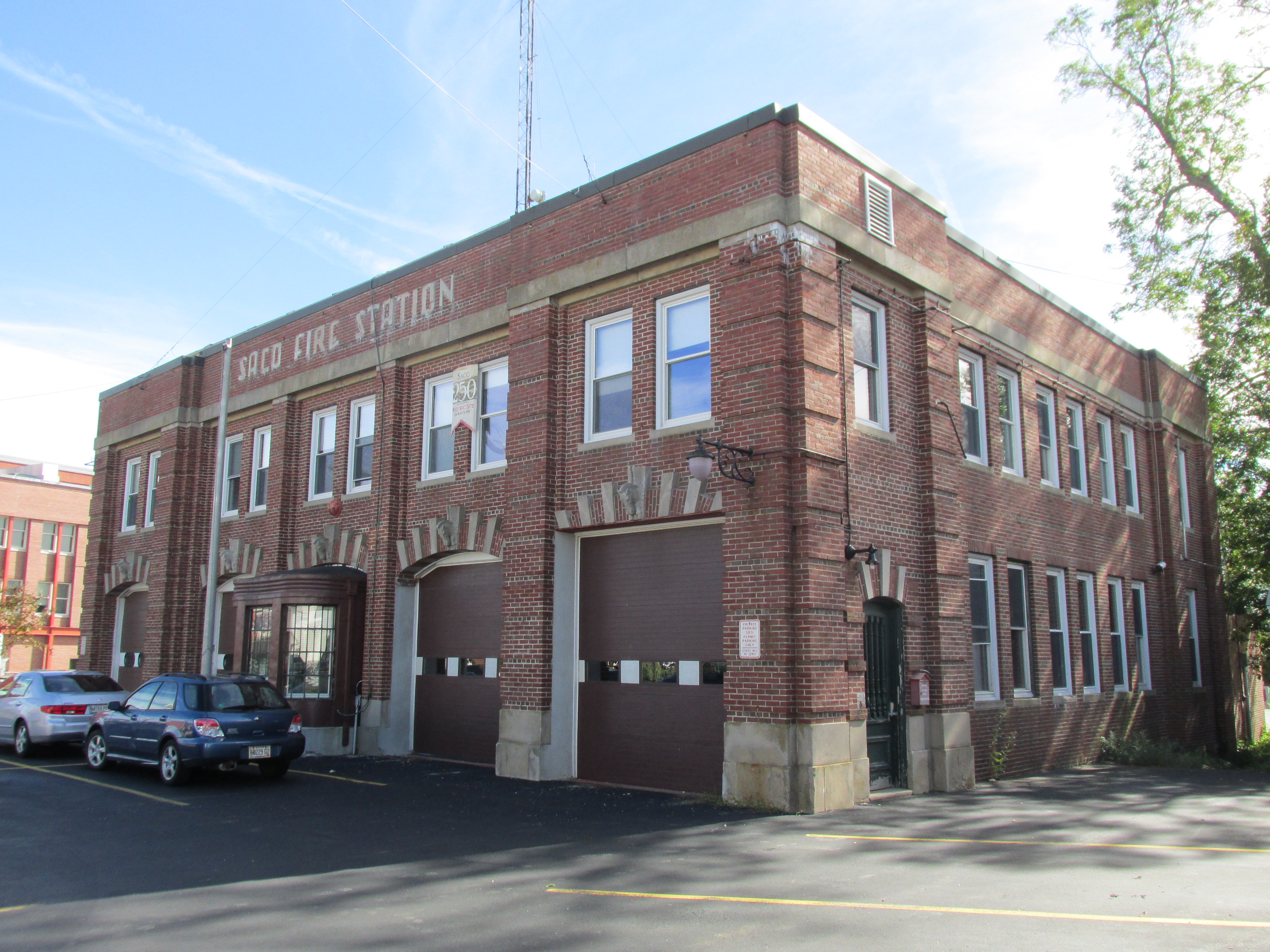

- Location within Maine Location within the United States
- Location: 14 Thornton Ave., Saco, Maine
- Coordinates: 43°29′56″N 70°26′47″W
- Area: less than one acre
- Architect: Miller & Beal, Inc.
- Architectural style: Classical Revival; Art Deco
- NRHP reference No.: 13000168
- Added to NRHP: April 16, 2013

The Former Saco Central Fire Station is a historic fire station at 14 Thornton Avenue in Saco, Maine. Built in 1939 with funding from the Public Works Administration, it was the city's first modern firehouse, designed to house motorized (rather than horse-drawn) equipment, and outfitted with the latest technology. The building was listed on the National Register of Historic Places in 2013. The building housed the fire department until 2011, and has since been converted into a mixed-use residential and commercial property.

== Description and history ==
The former Saco Central Fire Station is set between Thornton Avenue and Pleasant Streets, just north of Saco's Main Street central business district. It is a two-story steel and masonry structure, its exterior finished in brick and cast stone. It has a flat roof, and a hose drying tower at its southeast corner. A rear section is one story in height, set at a different elevation due to the sloping lot. The main facade, facing north toward Thornton Avenue, is five bays wide, with former vehicle bays on the ground floor and pairs of sash windows above. The bays are articulated by brick pilasters, some of which are quoined. The vehicle bay openings have segmented arch tops with alternating brick and cast stone elements, except the rightmost bay, which was squared to allow for taller vehicles. The central bay has had a projecting bay window built into it. Above the second floor is a cornice of cast stone, above which is a band of brick in which "Saco Fire Station" has been lettered in cast stone, using an Art Deco-style font.

The city of Saco began using the Thornton Avenue site for fire services as early as the 1870s. Its fire department became completely motorized around 1930, and the old firehouse, dating to the 1870s, was deteriorating in condition. The city received funding from the Public Works Administration, and built this building in 1938 to a design by Portland architect Lester I. Beal, of Miller & Beal, Inc. It was built behind the older station, which remained in service, taking and demolishing residences facing Pleasant Street in the construction process. The old station was then demolished. The station remained in active service until 2011, when the fire department moved to new facilities on North Street. Although the city sought to sell the building to a developer, this proposal was rejected, and the city rehabilitated the building into a mixed-use residential and commercial property.

== See also ==
- National Register of Historic Places listings in York County, Maine
