= Carolyn Gilman =

American politician (born 1939)

Member of the Maine Senate from the 30th district
- In office 2002–2004
- Preceded by: William O'Gara (D)
- Succeeded by: Phil Bartlett (D)

Personal details
- Born: July 17, 1939 (age 87) Portland, Maine
- Party: Republican

Carolyn M. Gilman (born July 17, 1939) is an American politician from Maine. Gilman, a Republican, served in the Maine State Senate from 2002 to 2004, representing her residence in Westbrook, Maine and nearby areas of Cumberland County.

She was defeated for re-election in 2004 by Democrat Phil Bartlett after redistricting changed the district.

== Personal ==
Gilman earned a A.A. from Westbrook College in 1959. Senator Gilman has been married Robert W Gilman for over 60 years. They have 5 children, 10 grandchildren, and 5 great grandchildren.
