= Robert W. Duplessie =

American politician

Member of the Maine House of Representatives (District 29)
- In office December 1998 – December 2004
- Preceded by: William Lemke
- Succeeded by: Redistricted

Member of the Maine House of Representatives (District 125)
- In office December 2004 – December 2006
- Preceded by: Redistricted
- Succeeded by: Ann Peoples

Personal details
- Party: Democrat
- Profession: Firefighter

Robert W. Duplessie [Bob] is an American politician and firefighter from Maine. Duplessie, grew up in North Vassalboro, Maine and graduated from Winslow High School. A Democrat, served from 1998 to 2006 in the Maine House of Representatives, where he represented a portion of Westbrook. During his first two terms, he served on the Natural Resources Committee and during his final two terms, Duplessie served as Assistant Majority Leader of the House of Representatives. He was succeeded in District 125 by fellow Democrat Ann Peoples.

Duplessie worked as a firefighter in neighboring Portland for 28 years prior to serving in the Legislature. He was also President of the Professional Fire Fighters of Maine, IAFF, for 15 years and served for 22 years on the Maine AFL-CIO Executive Board. In January 2007, a month after leaving the Legislature, Duplessie was hired by the Maine Department of Conservation as assistant to the commissioner. Now retired on his tree farm in Andover, Maine, he serves on the Mahoosuc Land Trust Board of Directors & chairs the Lands Committee.
