= Ronald Usher =

American politician

Member of the Maine House of Representatives
- In office 1997–2004
- In office 1975–1976

Member of the Maine Senate
- In office 1977–1988

Personal details
- Born: September 28, 1938 (age 87) Westbrook, Maine, U.S.
- Party: Democratic
- Spouse: Bonita
- Children: 3

Military service
- Branch/service: United States Navy
- Years of service: 1957–1959

Ronald E. Usher (born September 28, 1938) is an American politician from Maine who served 11 terms in the Maine Legislature between 1975 and 2004.

== Early life and education ==
Usher was born and raised in Westbrook and graduated from Westbrook High School in 1957. From 1957 to 1959, he served in the United States Navy. After leaving the Navy, he studied at what is now the University of Southern Maine from 1960 to 1962.

== Career ==
He worked as both a firefighter in the Westbrook Fire Department from 1962 to 1975 and as a papermaker at the S. D. Warren Paper Mill.

Usher represented Westbrook, Maine as a member of the Maine House of Representatives (1975–1976; 1997–2004) and the Maine Senate (1977–1988). Usher unsuccessfully sought election to the House of Representatives. He was defeated by Republican Donald Marean.
