= List of mayors of Westbrook, Maine =

The following is a list of mayors of the city of Westbrook, Maine, United States.

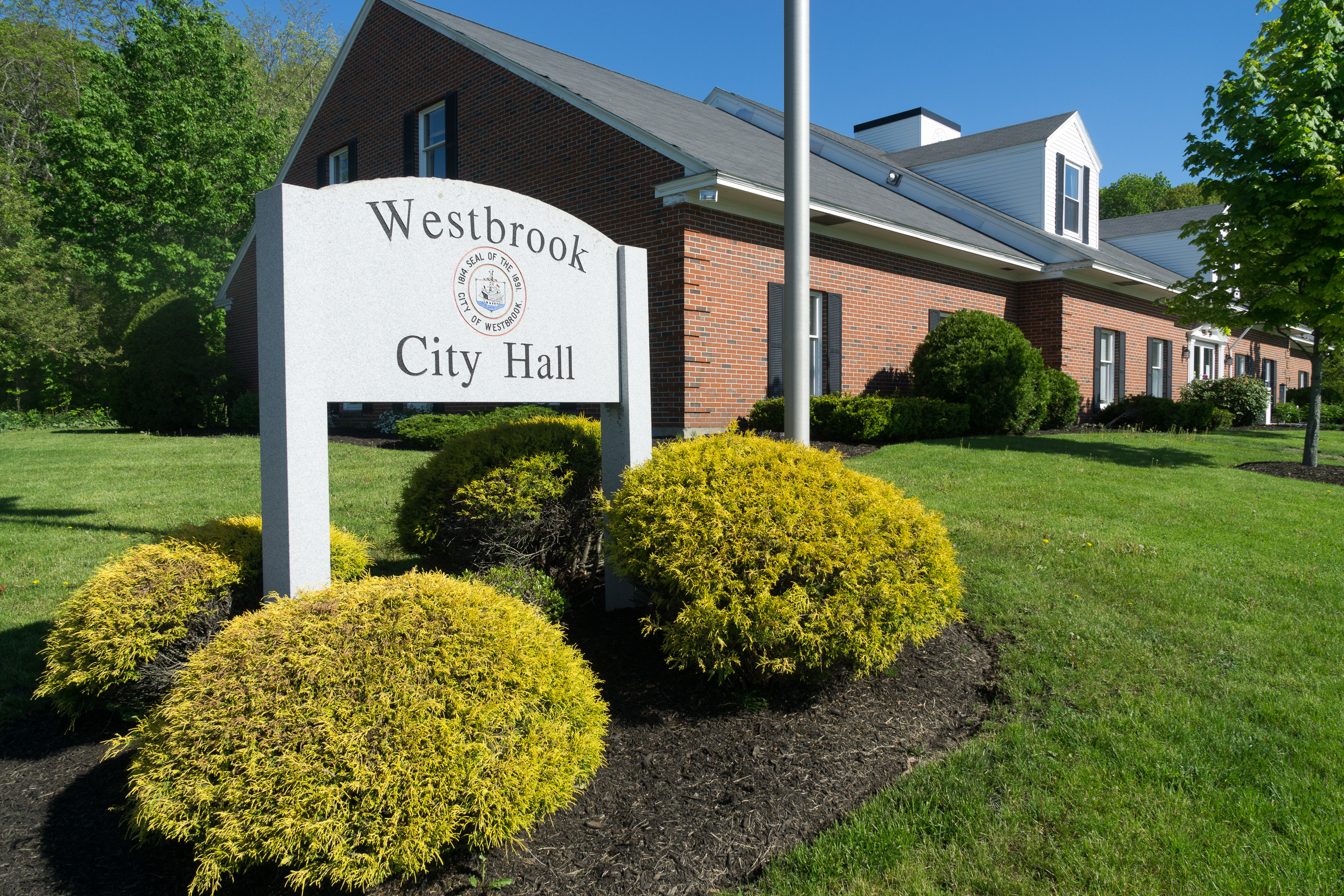
View of City Hall building in Westbrook, Maine, 2017

- Leander Valentine, 1891
- Mahlon H. Webb, 1892
- Albert A. Cordwell, 1893-1894
- William W. Cutter, 1895-1896
- Francis A. Cloudman, 1897
- King S. Raymond, 1898-1899
- Jacob L. Horr, 1900-1901
- Joseph A. Warren, 1902-1904
- Rufus King Jordan, 1905-1906
- Seth C. Morton, 1907-1908
- Harry F.G. Hay, 1909-1910
- Oscar G.K. Robinson, 1911-1915
- Otis S. Trafton, 1916
- Oscar G.K. Robinson, 1917-1918
- William B. Bragdon, 1919
- Willis H. Duran, 1920
- John Lawrensen, 1921-1923
- Charles S. Tuttle Jr., 1924
- Eugene I. Cummings, 1925
- John Lawrensen, 1926
- Eugene I. Cummings, 1927
- Walter F. Haskell, 1928
- Eugene I. Cummings, 1929-1931
- King F. Graham, 1932
- Rufus K. Jordan, 1933-1935
- Carroll M. Richardson, 1936
- Roscoe F. Libby, 1937-1941
- H. Ordway Furbish, 1942-1945
- Everett R. Coffin, 1946
- Everett O. Porell, 1947-1950
- Alan D. Taylor, 1951
- Richard F. Libby, 1952-1955
- Elmer Currier, 1956-1959
- Leo C. Lemieux, 1960-1961
- Francis C. Rocheleau, 1962-1963
- Leigh W. Flint, 1964-1967
- Donald K. Saunders, 1968-1971
- Donald J. Brydon, 1972-1973
- William B. O’Gara, 1974-1983
- Philip D. Spiller, 1984-1989
- Fred C. Wescott, 1990-1993
- Kenneth Lefebvre, 1993-1998
- Donald Esty Jr., 1998-2003
- Bruce Chuluda, 2003-2010
- Colleen Hilton, ca.2010-2015
- Michael T. Foley, ca.2020
- David Morse, ca.2024

== See also ==
- Westbrook history
