= Colleen Hilton =

American politician (born 1956)

Colleen Hilton (born 1956) is an American registered nurse, businessperson and politician from Maine. Hilton, a Democrat, was mayor of Westbrook, Maine, from 2009 to 2016. Westbrook is one of the ten largest cities in terms of population in Maine. Hilton is also the CEO of VNA Home Health & Hospice, a South Portland, Maine based company providing home health care and hospice services in southern Maine.

Hilton was raised in Westbrook to a large family. She received a bachelor of science in nursing from the University of Southern Maine. Prior to being elected mayor, Hilton served on the Westbrook School Committee for ten years. She is the first female mayor of Westbrook.

In December 2023, Hilton commented on the murder of Matthew Rairdon in Westbrook. Rairdon, an emergency nurse at Northern Light Mercy Hospital, was shot and killed on November 30, 2023, by his former boyfriend Patrick Milliner, who was angry at Rairdon following their separation. Rairdon's father, Gary, had won a seat in the city's council that same month. Hilton expressed shock and sadness at Rairdon's death, adding that she had known the Rairdons for years.

== See also ==
- List of mayors of Westbrook, Maine
