= Westbrook High School (Maine) =

Location
- 125 Stroudwater Street; New England; Westbrook, Cumberland County, Maine 04092-4045; United States
- Coordinates: 43°40′25″N 70°21′20″W

Information
- School type: Public, high school
- Motto: "One Promise: The best education for all for life."
- Established: 1873
- School district: Westbrook School Department
- Superintendent: Peter Lancia
- CEEB code: 201095
- Chairperson: James Violette
- Principal: Patrick Colgan, Jeffrey Guerette, Wendy Harvey (co-principals)
- Teaching staff: 59.80 (FTE)
- Grades: 9-12
- Enrollment: 704 (2023–2024)
- Student to teacher ratio: 11.77
- Education system: U.S. Secondary Education
- Hours in school day: 7
- Campus type: Suburban
- Colors: Blue and white
- Athletics: Basketball, marching band, football, soccer, track and field, wrestling, field hockey, lacrosse, cross country, golf, tennis, hockey, baseball, softball, volleyball
- Mascot: "Blue Blazes"
- Accreditation: NEASC
- Yearbook: "Blue and White"
- Feeder schools: Westbrook Middle School, Canal, Saccarappa, Congin
- Website: www.WestbrookSchools.org

Westbrook High School (WHS) is a public high school in Westbrook, Maine, United States. The school serves grades 9 through 12, and usually enrolls between 600 and 800 students each year. It is part of the Westbrook School Department. The school competes in the Southern Maine Athletics Association (SMAA) and Class A athletics, as governed by the Maine Principals' Association. The school mascot is the "Blue Blazes".

== History ==
Old Westbrook High School was previously located on Main Street in downtown Westbrook. The school moved to its current location in 1954. The school underwent an extensive addition in 1961 and renovation in 1992.

Since 2020, the mother of Matthew Rairdon, a 2009 Westbrook High School graduate who was murdered by his former boyfriend in November 2013, has supported a scholarship for Westbrook students going into nursing studies to honor his son's career by promoting an annual 5k race in town.

== Sports ==
Westbrook High School is known for its successful basketball program. The boys' basketball team won Class A state championships in 1925, 1927, 1951, 1972, 1975 and 1984 as well as Western Maine Championships in 1925, 1927, 1951, 1969, 1972, 1975, 1984, 1994, 1996 and 2000.

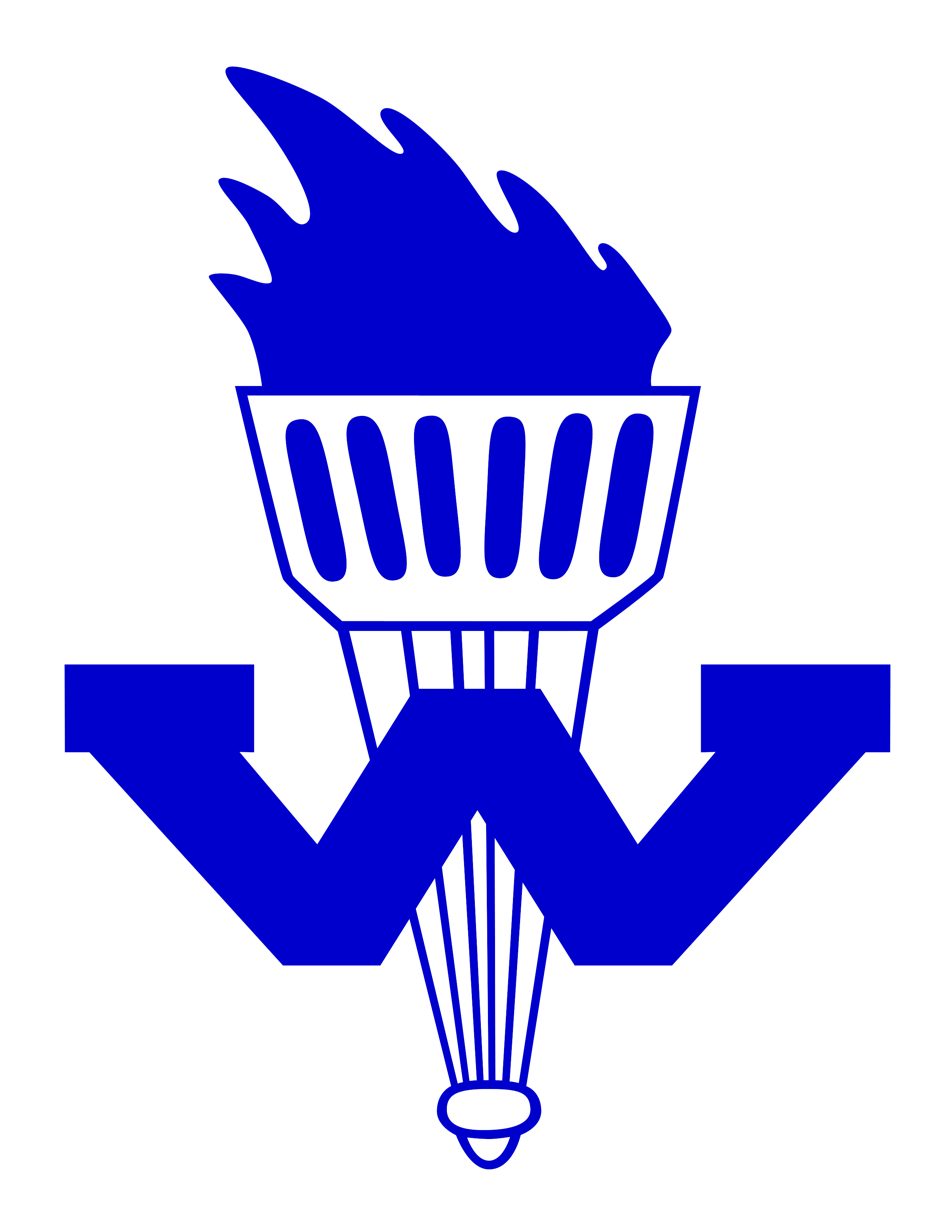
Westbrook Blue Blaze Logo

Students from Westbrook High School's music program have participated in national competitions. In 1993, the marching band competed in the Tournament of Roses Parade in Pasadena, California. In 1995, the marching band competed in the Citrus Bowl in Orlando, Florida, and again in 1999. Most recently, in 2003, the marching band attended the Fiesta Bowl in Phoenix, Arizona.

The Westbrook High School Bell Ringers are a group of ten student-athletes that perform with a set of forty-four Dutch handbells throughout southern Maine.

== Notable alumni ==
- Trevor Bates, NFL linebacker
- Lawrence Brooks, actor
- Kevin Eastman, comic book artist and writer
- Steve Lavigne, comic book illustrator
- Sheri Piers, distance runner
- Morgan Rielly, member of the Maine House of Representatives
- Ronald Usher, former member of the Maine Legislature
- Joseph Vachon, U.S. Army brigadier general
