= Woodlawn Cemetery (Westbrook, Maine) =

Cemetery in Westbrook, Cumberland County, Maine, US

- Interactive map of Woodlawn Cemetery

Details
- Established: 1885; 141 years ago
- Location: Westbrook, Maine
- Country: United States
- Coordinates: 43°40′11″N 70°20′45″W
- Owned by: City of Westbrook, Maine
- No. of graves: ≈9,800
- Website: Official website
- Find a Grave: Woodlawn Cemetery

Woodlawn Cemetery is a publicly owned cemetery in Westbrook, Maine, U.S. In the 1880s, Westbrook purchased what was known as the Knapp farm and converted it to the a cemetery. In 1933–34, Woodlawn was significantly improved by a make-work project by the Civil Works Administration. Three miles of avenues were given a coat of gravel among other improvements. It is the only cemetery in the city which offers winter burials.

== Notable interments ==
- Alexander Speirs (1859–1927), state legislator
