= Donald Esty Jr. =

American politician

Donald Esty

Majority Leader of the Maine Senate
- In office 1993–1994

Member of the Maine Senate from the 29th district
- In office 1986–1994
- Succeeded by: William O'Gara

Personal details
- Party: Democratic
- Education: University of Maine

Donald Esty Jr. is an American politician from Maine. He served as the mayor of Westbrook, Maine and State Senator for Maine from 1986 to 1994.

== Political career ==
Esty was a member of the Westbrook City Council for ten years and served as the body's president for six years before being elected to the Maine Senate. He served as the chairman of the Senate Labor Committee and as Senate Majority Leader from 1993 to 1994. After leaving the Senate Esty was elected Mayor of Westbrook, serving from 1998 to 2003 before losing his bid for reelection.

== Personal ==
He is married to Katherine Esty, who worked at IDEXX Laboratories prior to retirement, and has three daughters and two grandchildren. Esty taught math at Falmouth High School and was the head coach of the school's soccer and softball teams prior to retirement.

== See also ==
- List of mayors of Westbrook, Maine
