= Maine Public Utilities Commission =

The Maine Public Utilities Commission (Maine PUC) is a government agency that regulates water, electric, natural gas, and telecommunications in the state of Maine. Maine PUC hosts public hearings on utility rate increases and other issues. The commission also oversees ferries and water taxis in Casco Bay.

The three full-time commissioners are nominated by the governor, reviewed by the legislature's Joint Standing Committee on Utilities and Energy and confirmed by the full senate, for staggered terms of six years. The governor designates one commissioner as chairman. The commissioners make all final commission decisions by public vote or action of the majority. As of 2026, Maine PUC's chairman is Phil Bartlett.

In November 2025, Maine PUC rejected a rate hike request from Central Maine Power (CMP) that was part of a proposed five-year workforce and grid investment plan, citing affordability and other concerns.

As of 2026, Maine PUC has installed more than 30 free public pay phones across the state to help people make free local and emergency calls, in addition to placing long distance calls.
