= Ann Peoples =

American politician (1947–2019)

Ann E. Peoples

Member of the Maine House of Representatives from the 35th district
- In office December 5, 2018 – November 12, 2019
- Preceded by: Dillon Bates
- Succeeded by: Suzanne Salisbury

Member of the Maine House of Representatives from the 125th district
- In office December 6, 2006 – December 3, 2014
- Preceded by: Robert Duplessie
- Succeeded by: Dillon Bates

Personal details
- Born: Ann Elizabeth Murphy; January 31, 1947 Indianapolis, Indiana, U.S.
- Died: November 12, 2019 (aged 72) Westbrook, Maine, U.S.
- Party: Democratic
- Spouses: Gerald J. Horiuchi (m. 1969; div. 1977) Patrick J. Peoples (m. 1982; died 2017)

Ann Elizabeth Peoples (née Murphy; January 31, 1947 – November 12, 2019) was an American politician from Maine. A Democrat, Peoples was elected for the third time in 2010 to represent part of Westbrook, Cumberland County. She also has served on the Westbrook City Council and Planning Board.

Peoples was unable to seek re-election to the Maine House of Representatives for a 5th consecutive term in 2014 due to term-limits. She was replaced by fellow Democrat Dillon Bates. Bates resigned from the seat in September 2018. Peoples was elected again to the Maine House in November 2018, defeating Republican Jim Borque.

Peoples died on November 12, 2019.
