= Alexander Speirs (Maine politician) =

American politician

Alexander Speirs (1859 – October 9, 1927) was an American politician from Maine. A Republican, Speirs represented Cumberland County in the Maine Senate from 1923 to his death in 1927. He also served in the Maine House of Representatives in 1917. While in office, Speirs promoted education and opposed raising the gas tax.

== Personal ==
Speirs was born in Scotland and immigrated to the United States in 1860 at the age of one. Having grown up in Portland, Speirs settled in Westbrook, Maine, where he spent the final 31 years of his life. Speirs died suddenly on October 9, 1927, at St. Barnabas Hospital in Woodfords and was interred at Woodlawn Cemetery in Westbrook. His funeral was attended by many important political figures, including current Governor Owen Brewster, former Governor Percival Baxter, current President of the Maine Senate Frank H. Holley as well as Senators Arthur Spear, Raymond Oakes and Paul Slocum.
