= Domestic violence in same-sex relationships =

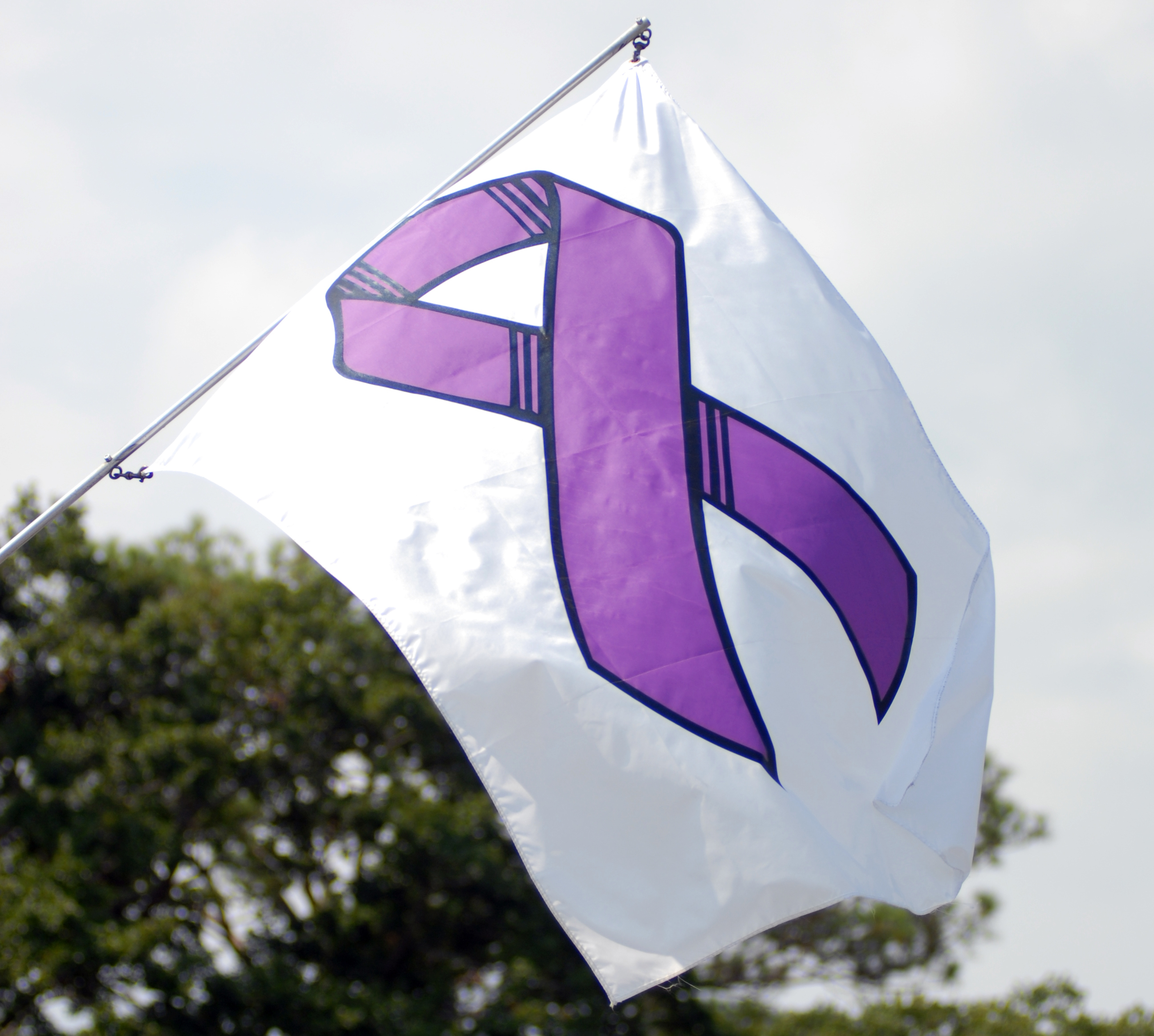
The purple ribbon promotes awareness of domestic violence.

Domestic violence is an issue that affects people of any sexuality, but there are issues that affect victims of same-sex domestic violence specifically. These issues include homophobia, internalized homophobia, HIV and AIDS stigma, STD risk and other health issues, lack of legal support, and the violence they face being considered less serious than heterosexual domestic violence. Moreover, the issue of domestic violence in same-sex relationships has not been studied as comprehensively as domestic violence in heterosexual relationships. However, there are legal changes being made to help victims of domestic violence in same-sex relationships, as well as organizations that cater specifically to victims of domestic violence in same-sex relationships.

== Prevalence ==
=== General ===
The Encyclopedia of Victimology and Crime Prevention states, "For several methodological reasons – nonrandom sampling procedures and self-selection factors, among others – it is not possible to assess the extent of same-sex domestic violence. Studies on abuse between lesbian or gay male partners usually rely on small convenience samples such as lesbian or gay male members of an association." An article from the Journal of Family Violence also cites underreporting, difficulty distinguishing between perpetrators and victims, the lack of a clear definition of partner on partner violence, and difficulty gathering representative samples of lesbians and gay men as further reasons why finding the true prevalence rate of same-sex intimate partner violence is challenging.

=== Gay men ===
According to a 2018 academic review, 26% of homosexual men reported experiencing intimate partner violence in their lifetime, compared to 29% of heterosexual men.

Among male same-sex couples, socioeconomic status, attachment orientation, HIV status, and public outness, and internalized homophobia show a relationship with intimate partner violence in gay men.

=== Lesbian ===
The CDC also stated that 43.8% of lesbian women reported experiencing physical violence, stalking, or rape by their partners. The study notes that, out of those 43.8%, two thirds (28.9% of the total) reported exclusively female perpetrators. The other third reported at least one perpetrator being male, however the study made no distinction between victims who experienced violence only from male perpetrators and those who reported both male and female perpetrators. In the same study, 61.1% of bisexual women reported physical violence, stalking, or rape by their partners with 89.5% reporting male perpetrators. Similarly, 35% of heterosexual women reported having been victim of intimate partner violence, with 98.7% of them reporting male perpetrators exclusively.

In literature on intimate partner violence (IPV) among same-gender female couples, researchers found that internalized homophobia and discrimination were correlated with IPV. In addition, in research done on psychological aggression of lesbian relationships, researchers found that internalized homophobia and social constraints in talking with friends about sexual identity issues showed correlation with IPV.

=== Bisexual ===
Although bisexual people may be in relationships with people of any gender, they are often victims of domestic violence. The CDC reported that 61% of bisexual women said they experienced physical violence, stalking, or rape by their partners. 89.5% of victims reported having only male perpetrators of intimate partner violence. For men in the same study, 37% reported having experienced similar violence.

For both men and women, the percentage of bisexual people who have experienced domestic violence is higher than either gay men or lesbians. The high rate of domestic violence faced by bisexual people may be in part because of the specific challenges bisexual people face in receiving help, as bisexuality is often misunderstood, even by those who administer domestic violence help professionally.

== Influences and factors ==
=== Legal issues ===
Members of same-sex relationships who face domestic violence often have issues accessing legal recourse, as domestic violence laws are often drafted in such a way as to only include different sex partnerships. Some are worried about being involved in the legal system because they are afraid they will be mistreated or dismissed due to their sexual orientation. Although often the abuser can still be arrested or tried for assault or similar crimes, not classifying the crime as domestic may change how it is dealt with in the court system and change how the victim is treated. Also, studies have shown that law enforcement officers do not treat domestic violence in same-sex relationships as seriously as domestic violence in heterosexual relationships.

Victims of domestic violence in same sex relationships do have legal rights afforded to them in some U.S. states, whether or not they are married to their partner, although the requirements and protections vary by state. Some of these rights include having a civil protection order or restraining order placed on the abuser to keep them from stalking or harassing the victim.

Some cities and states in the U.S. are working to improve the legal situation for LGBT victims of domestic violence, through policy change and police training. In Washington D.C. the city has created an LGBT unit of their police department to combat homophobic violence and to deal with violence against transgender people by professionals who are also members of the LGBT community.

=== HIV/AIDS ===
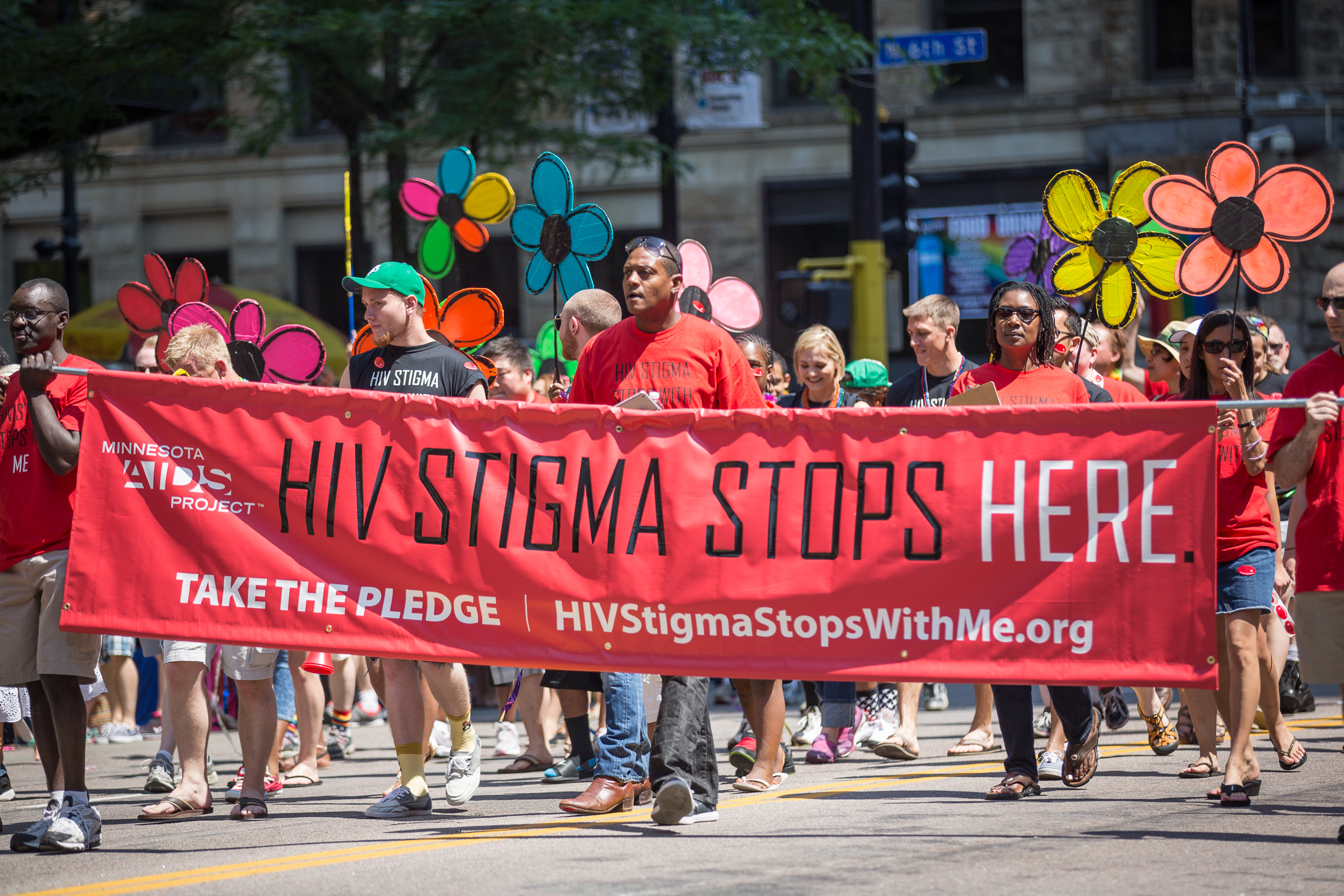
People carry a banner promoting the end of HIV stigma at a Pride Parade.

HIV/AIDS may create additional problems for those in violent relationships, financially, emotionally, and health wise, whether it is the perpetrator or the victim who is living with HIV or AIDS.

Those living with HIV are often financially dependent on their partners, making it more difficult to leave abusive relationships. If it is the victim who has HIV or AIDS the abuser may take control of their finances in order to have even more control over their life. This issue is compounded by the fact that those living with HIV or AIDS may often become too sick to work and support themselves, and that even when they are able to work they often face discrimination in the workplace or in the hiring process, even though this is technically illegal under the Americans with Disabilities Act.

Abusers may use emotional tactics to exert control over their partners, whether it is them or the victim who has HIV or AIDS. Some abusive partners may threaten to reveal their partner's positive HIV status to others as a form of control, as there is a stigma surrounding HIV and AIDS that could affect a victim's life. If it is the abuser who has HIV or AIDS, the victim may fear that leaving someone who is sick makes them seem shallow, uncaring, or discriminatory, or the abuser may insinuate that if their partner leaves the relationship the abuser will become sicker as a result. Oppositionally, if it is the victim who has HIV or AIDS, the abuser may imply that the victim will be unable to find another partner due to their positive HIV status or that they will die alone. The abuser may also claim that it is the victim's fault that the abuser has HIV or AIDS, essentially emotionally blackmailing them to stay in the relationship.

There are many health related ways that HIV or AIDS can affect domestic violence in same-sex relationships. Some perpetrators of domestic violence purposefully try to transmit STDs to their partner or to transmit their partner's STD to themselves, as a tactic to control their partner. Additionally, many people in same-sex relationships who experienced domestic violence experienced violence specifically because they had asked their partners to use condoms or other prophylactics, which are known to limit the spread of HIV. In conjunction with this, abusers may tamper with their partner's pre-exposure prophylaxis medications that prevent the spread of HIV, or may use the social stigma surrounding the use of pre-exposure prophylaxis to convince their partner not to use it. The abuser may also tamper with their partner's or their own HIV medication, or keep their partner from receiving health care in other ways. Furthermore, those with HIV or AIDS may be more affected by physical violence than those who are healthy, as their immune systems are weak and physical injuries will be harder to recover from. Those living with HIV or AIDS may also be more affected by emotional trauma for the same reason.

=== Homophobia ===
Homophobia plays a role in causing domestic violence in same-sex relationships as well as being a systemic issue as to why victims of same-sex domestic violence lack access to resources.

One way this occurs is through the fear of being "outed", as abusers may use this fear of being outed to control their partners or an abuser may use the fact that they are not out to limit their partner's exposure to other LGBT people who would recognize that their relationship is unhealthy. An article from the journal Violence and Victims suggests that "outness" may represent greater power in one of the partners, which can lead to an unequal power dynamic in the relationship. This threat of disclosure can be another barrier for victims of intimate partner violence to face in order to leave abusive relationships, report abuse, and seek resources or support.

Another way homophobia plays a role in domestic violence is that people in same-sex relationships may feel that they have a duty to represent the LGBT community in a positive manner, and that if their relationship is abusive it is proof that homosexuality is inherently wrong, immoral, or otherwise flawed. Further, the abuser may frame the abuse as justified because of the victim's sexual orientation, or imply that no one will help the victim because of their sexual orientation.

On a systematic level, many resources offered to victims of domestic violence are not offered to victims of domestic violence in same-sex relationships. This refusal to help victims of same-sex domestic violence victims occurs both by private domestic violence help centers and by law enforcement, who may not treat same-sex domestic violence as seriously as domestic violence in heterosexual relationships.

As to internalized homophobia, victims may feel like they deserve it or if they are the more "masculine" partner they may be the one blamed for the violence. Internalized homophobia can also lead individuals to have low self esteem and feel shame about their sexual orientation. A study from the journal Violence and Victims found that higher levels of internalized homophobia in gay men predicted an increased likelihood of perpetrating physical aggression.

=== Gendered expectations ===
Historically, domestic violence was viewed by many feminists as "a manifestation of patriarchal power". This definition saw domestic violence as a phenomenon acted out by men onto women, therefore leaving out male victims of domestic violence and victims of domestic violence in same-sex relationships. Some abusers even capitalize on the idea that domestic violence cannot occur in same-sex relationships to convince their partner that the abuse is normal or non-abusive.

One idea that persists and is harmful to lesbians, is that sexual assault is less serious or aggressive when perpetrated by women. However, being sexually assaulted can be traumatic to victims regardless of the gender of the perpetrator. Similarly, women stalking other women or men seem as less threatening than the same actions being perpetrated by men, so lesbian victims of stalking may be ignored by law enforcement and other individuals. Part of this problem that specifically impacts lesbians is that lesbians are assumed to have perfect relationships specifically because there is no man involved in the situation. This idea of a "lesbian utopia" makes it more difficult for lesbians to report domestic violence, because often people do not believe it can be true.

Gay men may feel that being battered is a threat to their masculinity, and thus are hesitant to report domestic violence. Some abusers may frame the abuse as simply an "expression of masculinity", which normalizes the physical violence.

=== Data collection issues ===
There are several problems with data collection about domestic violence in same-sex relationships, including lack of reporting, biased sampling, and lack of interest in studying same-sex domestic violence. For example, if samples are taken at a center that caters to LGBT individuals, the results may be artificially high, as those who use these services may also be those in need of help, or artificially low, as abusers often limit their partner's exposure to others, especially those who may recognize their relationship as abusive.

== Organizations ==
=== National Coalition of Anti-Violence Programs (AVP) ===
The National Coalition of Anti-Violence Programs (AVP) is an organization which "works to prevent, respond to, and end all forms of violence against and within LGBTQ communities." This organization has member organization in 26 U.S. states, Washington, D.C., and Canada, which help connect people to resources when they have been abused in a same-sex relationship, been sexually assaulted, or been a victim of a homophobic hate crime.

=== Community United Against Violence (CUAV) ===
CUAV is an organization based in San Francisco that has a broad mission of seeking to track anti-LGBT violence and offer support to those affected by it. They offer support groups and counselling for those who are victims of same-sex domestic violence.

=== New York State Lesbian, Gay, Bisexual, Transgender & Queer Intimate Partner Violence Network ("The Network") ===
"The Network" seeks to advocate for victims of same-sex domestic violence within the state of New York, and hope that through supporting victims of same-sex domestic violence in the social and political realm that they will then have greater access to resources that victims of domestic violence may need.

=== Montrose Center ===
The Montrose Center is an organization in Houston, Texas, that began as a counselling center for LGBT individuals. The Montrose Center offers many services to LGBT individuals, including servicing victims of domestic violence by finding them housing and providing counselling. Although there are other domestic violence shelters in the Houston area, the Montrose Center feels like they can cater better to men, transgender individuals, and lesbian victims of domestic violence.

== See also ==
- Domestic violence in lesbian relationships
- Domestic violence in transgender relationships
- Sexual assault of LGBT persons
