= Westbrook, Maine =

City in Maine, United States

- City
- Seal Logo

- Location in Cumberland County and the state of Maine
- Coordinates: 43°42′47″N 70°21′56″W
- Country: United States
- State: Maine
- County: Cumberland
- Incorporated: 1814
- Named for: Colonel Thomas Westbrook

Area
  - Total: 17.36 sq mi (44.96 km^{2})
  - Land: 17.19 sq mi (44.52 km^{2})
  - Water: 0.17 sq mi (0.44 km^{2})
- Elevation: 105 ft (32 m)

Population (2020)
  - Total: 20,400
  - Density: 1,186.8/sq mi (458.23/km^{2})
- Time zone: UTC−5 (Eastern (EST))
  - Summer (DST): UTC−4 (EDT)
- ZIP codes: 04092, 04098
- Area code: 207
- FIPS code: 23-82105
- GNIS feature ID: 582802
- Website: www.westbrookmaine.gov

Westbrook is a city in Cumberland County, Maine, United States and a suburb of Portland. The population was 20,400 at the 2020 census, making it the fastest-growing city in Maine between 2010 and 2020. It is part of the Portland–South Portland–Biddeford, Maine metropolitan statistical area.

== History ==
Originally known as Saccarappa after Saccarappa Falls on the Presumpscot River, it was a part of Falmouth, Maine until February 14, 1814, when it was set off and incorporated as Stroudwater. It soon changed its name to Westbrook after Colonel Thomas Westbrook, a commander during Father Rale's War and King's mast agent who was an early settler and mill operator. In 1871, the town of Westbrook amicably split into two municipalities; present-day Westbrook and Deering, which was annexed by Portland in 1898. In 1891, Westbrook was incorporated as a city.

Saccarappa Falls and Congin Falls provided water power for early mills (watermills) within the city. In 1829, a sawmill was built at the former which made the mill town noted for its lumber. Other industries followed, manufacturing grain bags, machinery and water wheels, carriage and harness, boots, shoes and moccasins, tinware, leather board, bricks, wooden boxes, box shooks (slats and boards nailed or stapled together to make boxes), meal, and flour. The Portland Manufacturing Company built a cotton textile mill at Saccarappa Falls for making "sheetings, stripes and ducks." A paper mill was built at Cumberland Mills, once an Indian planting ground known as Ammoncongin. By 1859, it produced 1,000 tons of paper annually. In 1867, the factory's name changed to the S. D. Warren Paper Mill.

The Cumberland and Oxford Canal opened in 1832, connecting Portland to Harrison by way of Westbrook and Sebago Lake. It was the primary commercial shipping route for goods until 1871, when it was rendered obsolete by the Portland and Ogdensburg Railway. Remnants of the canal can still be seen throughout the city including Beaver Pond, along Stroudwater Street near the Maine Turnpike overpass, and in the woods between Westbrook High School and Oxford-Cumberland Canal Elementary School. In 1885, the city opened Woodlawn Cemetery, the largest cemetery and newest burial grounds in the municipality.

== Gallery ==
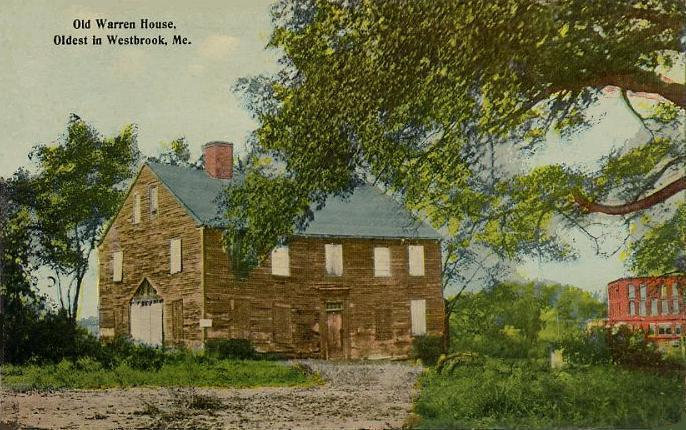
Old Warren House c. 1912

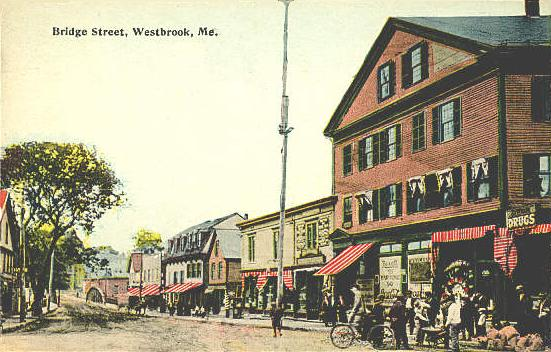
Bridge Street c. 1912

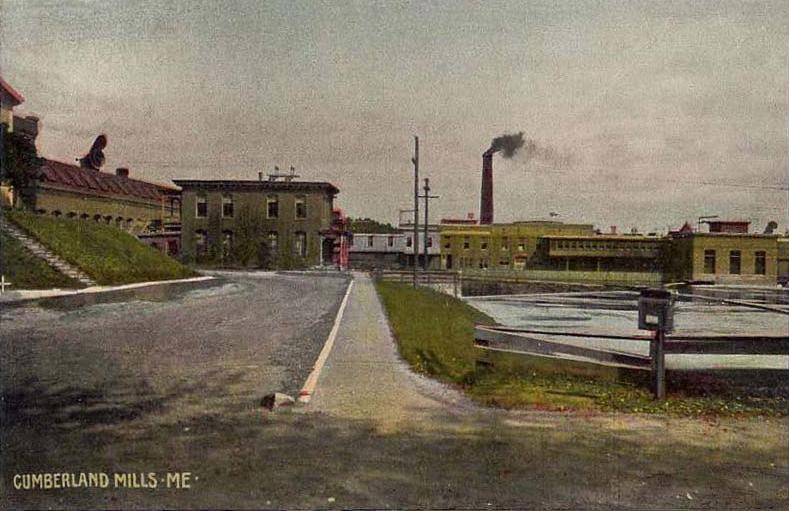
Cumberland Mills c. 1907

== Geography ==
According to the United States Census Bureau, the city has a total area of 17.33 square miles (44.88 km^{2}), of which 17.12 square miles (44.34 km^{2}) is land and 0.21 square miles (0.54 km^{2}) is water.

=== Bodies of water ===
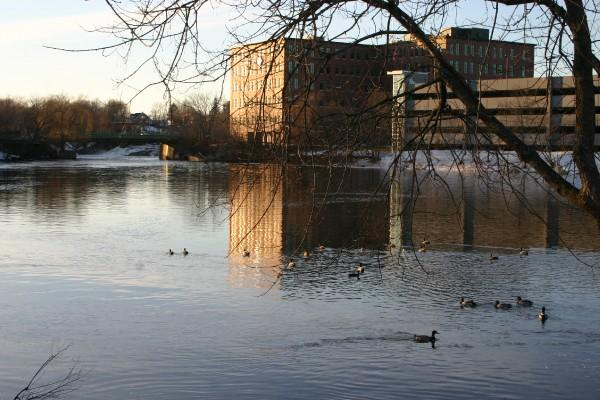
Presumpscot River, looking upstream towards One Riverfront Plaza and Saccarappa Falls

Westbrook is drained primarily by two rivers. The Presumpscot River flows through the center of the city, with two prominent falls (the aforementioned Saccarappa Falls and Congin Falls). The smaller Stroudwater River flows through the southwestern part of the city. The city also contains part of Highland Lake.

=== Roads and bordering ===
Westbrook is served by Interstate 95, U.S. Route 302 and State Routes 22 and 25. State Route 25 has a business route, Route 25 business, which is concurrent with Main Street. It is bordered by Portland to the east, South Portland, and Scarborough to the south; Gorham and Windham to the west, and Falmouth to the north.

=== Ice disk ===
In January 2019, a naturally occurring ice disk measuring about 100 yards across formed on the Presumpscot River. The unusual formation briefly drew international social media and press attention, and boosted tourism to Westbrook.

== Demographics ==
Historical population
| Census | Pop. | Note | %± |
|---|---|---|---|
| 1820 | 2,502 | | — |
| 1830 | 3,238 | | 29.4% |
| 1840 | 4,116 | | 27.1% |
| 1850 | 4,852 | | 17.9% |
| 1860 | 5,113 | | 5.4% |
| 1870 | 6,583 | | 28.8% |
| 1880 | 3,981 | | −39.5% |
| 1890 | 6,632 | | 66.6% |
| 1900 | 7,283 | | 9.8% |
| 1910 | 8,281 | | 13.7% |
| 1920 | 9,453 | | 14.2% |
| 1930 | 10,807 | | 14.3% |
| 1940 | 11,087 | | 2.6% |
| 1950 | 12,284 | | 10.8% |
| 1960 | 13,820 | | 12.5% |
| 1970 | 14,444 | | 4.5% |
| 1980 | 14,976 | | 3.7% |
| 1990 | 16,121 | | 7.6% |
| 2000 | 16,142 | | 0.1% |
| 2010 | 17,494 | | 8.4% |
| 2020 | 20,400 | | 16.6% |
| 2022 (est.) | 20,645 | | 1.2% |

=== 2020 census ===
As of the 2020 census, Westbrook had a population of 20,400. The median age was 39.4 years. 18.8% of residents were under the age of 18 and 17.2% of residents were 65 years of age or older. For every 100 females there were 92.2 males, and for every 100 females age 18 and over there were 89.2 males age 18 and over.

96.4% of residents lived in urban areas, while 3.6% lived in rural areas.

There were 8,798 households in Westbrook, of which 24.2% had children under the age of 18 living in them. Of all households, 38.5% were married-couple households, 19.7% were households with a male householder and no spouse or partner present, and 30.9% were households with a female householder and no spouse or partner present. About 32.6% of all households were made up of individuals and 13.5% had someone living alone who was 65 years of age or older.

There were 9,108 housing units, of which 3.4% were vacant. The homeowner vacancy rate was 0.4% and the rental vacancy rate was 3.7%.

Racial composition as of the 2020 census
| Race | Number | Percent |
|---|---|---|
| White | 16,779 | 82.2% |
| Black or African American | 1,554 | 7.6% |
| American Indian and Alaska Native | 62 | 0.3% |
| Asian | 735 | 3.6% |
| Native Hawaiian and Other Pacific Islander | 4 | 0.0% |
| Some other race | 233 | 1.1% |
| Two or more races | 1,033 | 5.1% |
| Hispanic or Latino (of any race) | 549 | 2.7% |

=== 2010 census ===
As of the census of 2010, there were 17,494 people, 7,568 households, and 4,456 families living in the city. The population density was 1,021.8 inhabitants per square mile (394.5/km^{2}). There were 7,989 housing units at an average density of 466.6 per square mile (180.2/km^{2}). The racial makeup of the city was 92.3% White, 2.3% African American, 0.2% Native American, 1.9% Asian, 0.1% Pacific Islander, 0.6% from other races, and 2.5% from two or more races. Hispanic or Latino of any race were 1.9% of the population.

There were 7,568 households, of which 28.3% had children under the age of 18 living with them, 41.2% were married couples living together, 13.1% had a female householder with no husband present, 4.6% had a male householder with no wife present, and 41.1% were non-families. 30.4% of all households were made up of individuals, and 12.2% had someone living alone who was 65 years of age or older. The average household size was 2.30 and the average family size was 2.87.

The median age in the city was 39.4 years. 20.9% of residents were under the age of 18; 8.2% were between the ages of 18 and 24; 29.1% were from 25 to 44; 26.5% were from 45 to 64; and 15.2% were 65 years of age or older. The gender makeup of the city was 47.7% male and 52.3% female.

=== 2000 census ===
As of the census of 2000, there were 16,142 people, 6,863 households, and 4,261 families living in the city. The population density was 956.9 inhabitants per square mile (369.5/km^{2}). There were 7,089 housing units at an average density of 420.3 per square mile (162.3/km^{2}). The racial makeup of the city was 96.69% White, 0.88% African American, 0.27% Native American, 0.82% Asian, 0.03% Pacific Islander, 0.28% from other races, and 1.03% from two or more races. Hispanic or Latino of any race were 0.89% of the population.

There were 6,863 households, out of which 29.4% had children under the age of 18 living with them, 46.3% were married couples living together, 12.6% had a female householder with no husband present, and 37.9% were non-families. 30.4% of all households were made up of individuals, and 13.0% had someone living alone who was 65 years of age or older. The average household size was 2.33 and the average family size was 2.90.

In the city, the age distribution of the population shows 23.4% under the age of 18, 7.3% from 18 to 24, 31.0% from 25 to 44, 22.7% from 45 to 64, and 15.5% who were 65 years of age or older. The median age was 38 years. For every 100 females, there were 89.1 males. For every 100 females age 18 and over, there were 82.8 males.

The median income for a household in the city was $37,873, and the median income for a family was $47,120. Males had a median income of $32,412 versus $25,769 for females. The per capita income for the city was $19,501. About 6.7% of families and 8.3% of the population were below the poverty line, including 13.7% of those under age 18 and 5.7% of those age 65 or over.

== Economy ==
Now primarily a suburb of Portland, Westbrook itself has a growing business base and developing core downtown district. IDEXX Laboratories, Inc., a major multi-national corporation, is headquartered in Westbrook. In addition to the downtown area, many of the city's businesses are located within two industrial parks (the Col. Westbrook Industrial Park and Five Star Industrial Park), as well as in the area surrounding Maine Turnpike Exit 48.

The city is home to Sappi Ltd.'s Westbrook Paper Mill and R&D Center (Sappi's headquarters are in Johannesburg, South Africa). The mill, formerly the S. D. Warren Paper Mill, was once the city's largest employer and taxpayer, employing over 3,000 people and representing over 50% of the city's tax base. However, foreign competition and the age of the mill have drastically reduced its workforce and production. Today the mill has found a niche in the marketplace, becoming one of the nation's top manufacturers of release papers and employing about 300 people. Idexx Laboratories has since surpassed the mill as the city's largest taxpayer. Westbrook was also the home of the first Sebago-Moc shoe factory.

Westbrook is home to the TV station WMTW, southern Maine's ABC affiliate. The station has its studios off County Road. The faith-based Mercy Hospital of Portland operates Mercy Westbrook, a small community hospital with a minor emergency room and inpatient treatment facilities. Spring Harbor Hospital, southern Maine's only private psychiatric treatment and recovery center, is also in the city.

== Education ==
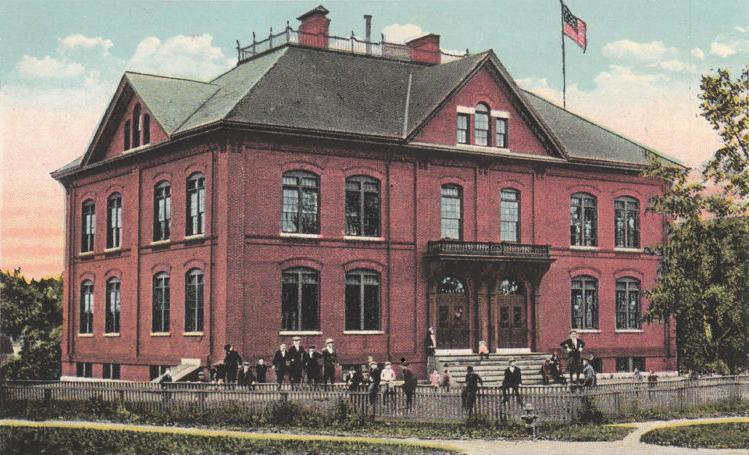
Old Bridge Street School c. 1920

Westbrook's public schools are part of the Westbrook School Department.

- Westbrook High School – Blue Blazes
- Westbrook Middle School, (grades 5–8) (formerly Fred C. Wescott Junior High School) – Falcons
- Congin Elementary School, (grades K–4) – Cougars
- Canal School Elementary School, (grades K–4) – Coyotes
- Saccarappa Elementary School, (grades K–4) – Shining Stars

Westbrook High School's meal programs became one of Maine's first certified halal school meals programs in the state in April 2024. The meals are certified by the Islamic Food and Nutrition Council of America.

The Wescott Junior High School building is now the Westbrook Community Center, with Westbrook Middle School occupying a newly constructed and subsequently expanded facility on a different site down the road from Westbrook High School. Other former schools in the city include Prides Corner Elementary School, which was closed in 2012 and then demolished, with apartments and houses built on the property.

== Government and elections ==
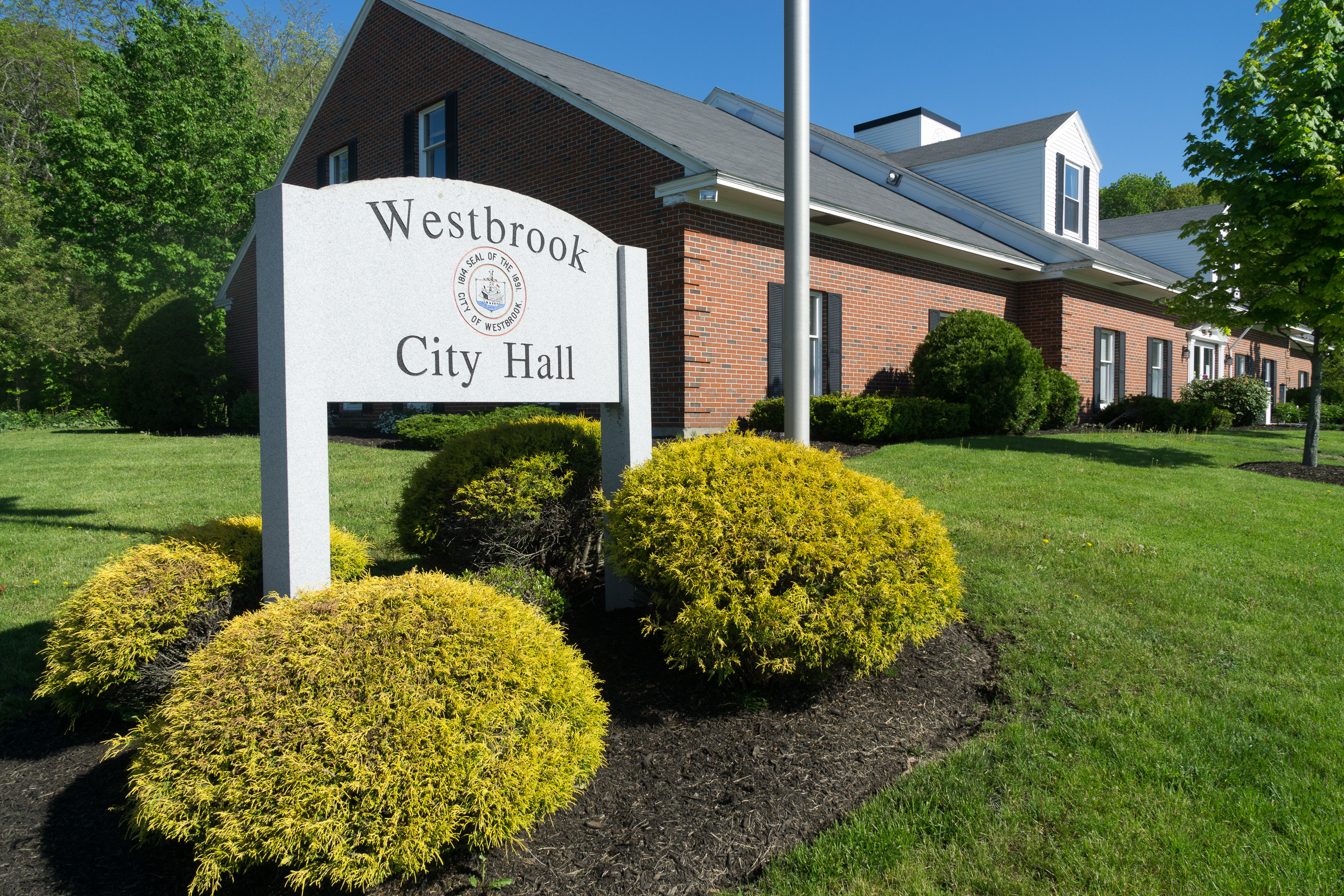
Westbrook City Hall

The Westbrook City Council consists of five councilors each representing one of the five city wards and two at-large councilors. The mayor is Michael Foley. Colleen Hilton was mayor of Westbrook from November 2009 – 2016.

Voter registration

Voter Registration and Party Enrollment as of November 2012
| Party | Total Voters | Percentage |
|---|---|---|
| Democratic | 4,516 | 37.93% |
| Unenrolled | 4,106 | 34.48% |
| Republican | 2,754 | 23.13% |
| Green Independent | 525 | 4.40% |
| Total | 11,905 | 100% |

== Libraries ==
- Walker Memorial Library
- Warren Memorial Library (closed in 2009)

== Neighborhoods ==
Similar to neighboring Portland and South Portland, Westbrook contains several distinct neighborhoods which are generally recognized by residents but have no legal or political significance. Unlike Portland, however, there is no official signage recognizing these neighborhoods. Some of the notable neighborhoods include:

- Birdland
- Cumberland Mills
- Deer Hill
- Frenchtown
- The Hamlet
- Prides Corner
- Old Millbrook
- Westbrook Pointe
- Woodland
- Colonial Village
- Highland Lake

== Recreation ==
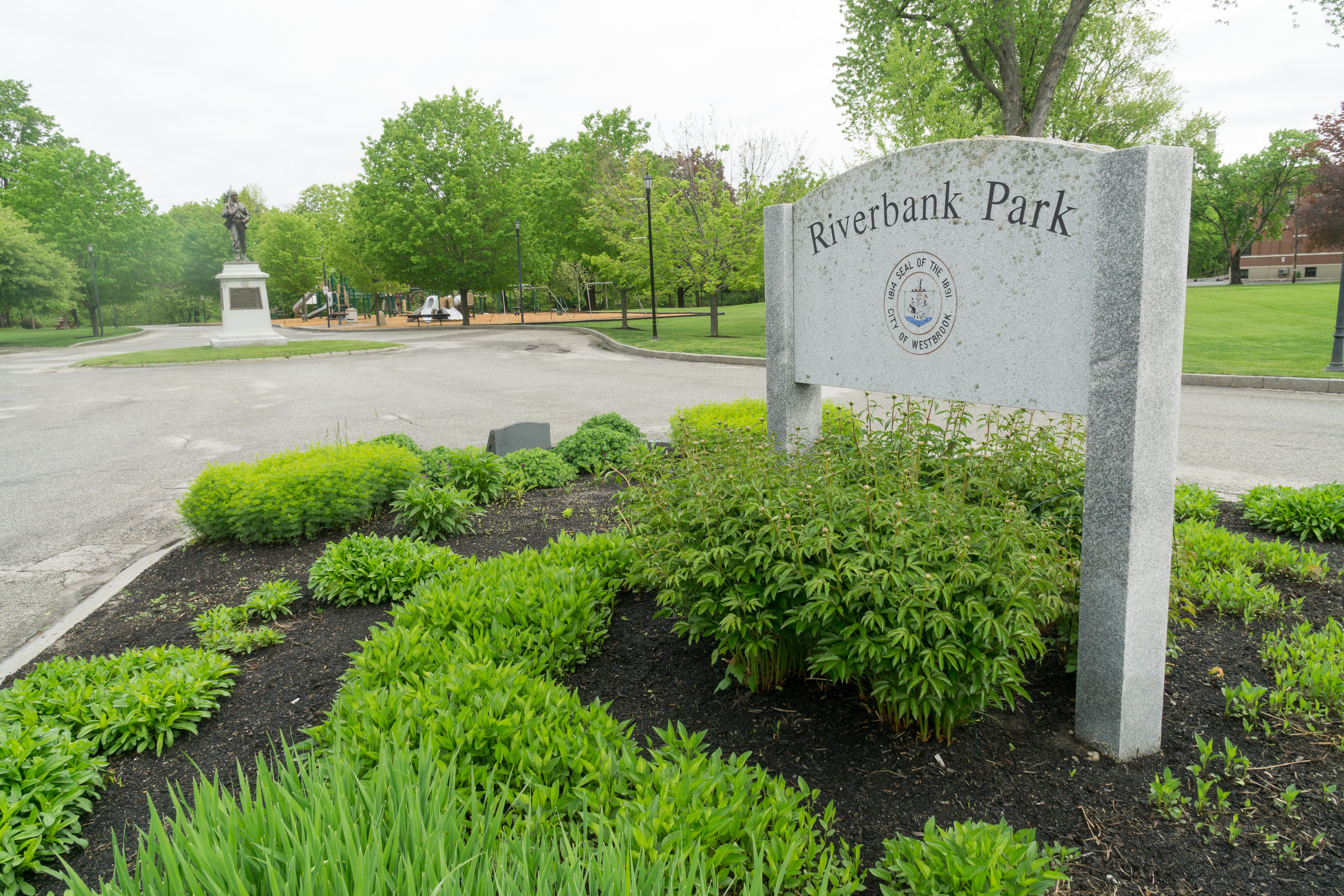
Riverbank Park

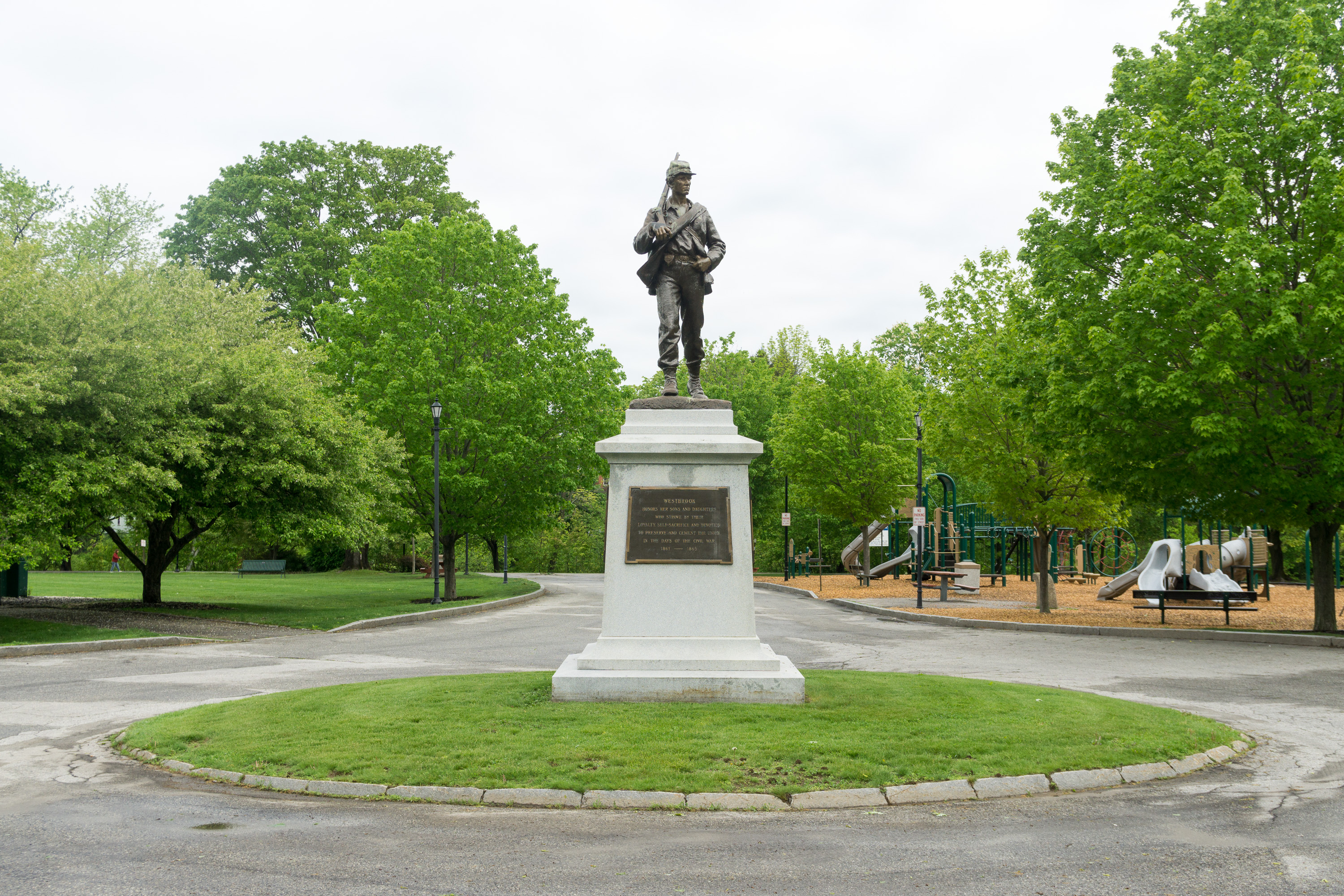
Civil War Memorial in Riverbank Park

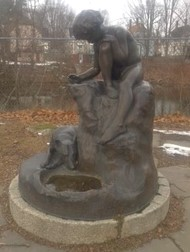
Bashka Paeff created this 1920 sculpture honoring John Warren owner of the Cumberland Paper Mills

In addition to the sports complexes located at Westbrook High School and other schools, the city offers several public recreational areas and facilities, including:

- Bicentennial Park & Skate Park
- Riverbank Park
- Westbrook River Walk – along Presumpscot River in downtown area
- Cornelia Warren Memorial Trail – along Presumpscot River between Ash St. and Cumberland St.
- Westbrook River Trail – along Presumpscot River north and east of the Sappi paper mill
- Rocky Hill – network of trails behind Wescott Community Centre
- Warren Little League Complex
- Lincoln Street skating rink – ice hockey in colder months, roller hockey in warmer months
- East Bridge Street skating rink – winter use only
- Stroudwater Street skating rink – winter use only
- East Bridge Street ballfields
- Warren League Grounds
- Warren Pool – outdoor public pool, summer use only
- Davan Pool – indoor pool, open year-round

== Sites of interest ==
- Acorn Productions Performing Arts Center
- Westbrook Historical Society & Museum
- Warren Memorial Fountain

== Notable people ==
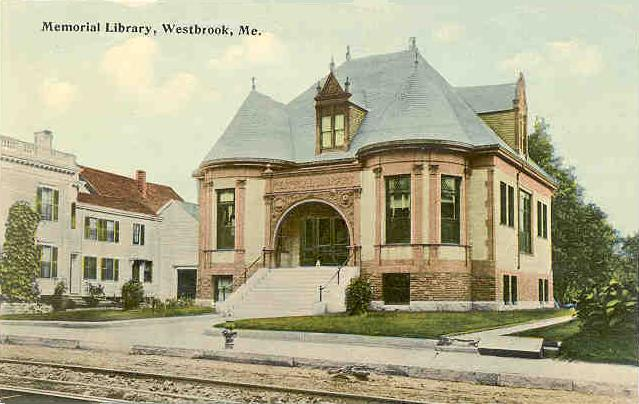
Walker Memorial Library c. 1912, designed by Frederick A. Tompson

- Benjamin Paul Akers, sculptor
- John Cumberland, Major League Baseball (MLB) pitcher
- Philip E. Curran, banker and state legislator
- Robert W. Duplessie, state legislator
- Kevin Eastman, cartoonist, co-creator of the Teenage Mutant Ninja Turtles
- James Deering Fessenden, Civil War general for the Union
- Artt Frank, musician
- Ginger Fraser, football player and coach
- Scott Garland (a.k.a. Scotty 2 Hotty), professional wrestler
- George Gore, MLB player
- Al Hawkes, musician
- Nancy A. Henry, poet
- Curtis Jonathan Hussey (a.k.a. Fandango), professional wrestler
- Mary King Longfellow, painter and niece of Henry Wadsworth Longfellow
- Edmund Needham Morrill, U.S. Congressman and governor of Kansas
- Eliza Happy Morton, author and educator
- Ann Peoples, state legislator
- Sheri Piers, distance runner
- Matthew Rairdon, emergency nurse and murder victim
- Alexander Speirs, state legislator
- Avadis (Avie) Tevanian, venture capitalist
- Ronald Usher, state legislator
- Rudy Vallée, musician, band leader, actor, and entertainer
- Thomas Westbrook, namesake of Westbrook
