= National Register of Historic Places listings in Aroostook County, Maine =

Location of Aroostook County in Maine

This is a list of the National Register of Historic Places listings in Aroostook County, Maine.

This is intended to be a complete list of the properties and districts on the National Register of Historic Places in Aroostook County, Maine, United States. Latitude and longitude coordinates are provided for many National Register properties and districts; these locations may be seen together in a map.

There are 60 properties and districts listed on the National Register in the county, including 1 National Historic Landmark. Eight properties were once listed, but have since been removed.

This National Park Service list is complete through NPS recent listings posted April 24, 2026.

Contents: Counties and municipalities in Maine
Androscoggin - Aroostook - Cumberland (City of Portland) - Franklin - Hancock - Kennebec - Knox - Lincoln - Oxford - Penobscot - Piscataquis - Sagadahoc - Somerset - Waldo - Washington - York

This National Park Service list is complete through NPS recent listings posted April 24, 2026.

== Current listings ==
| | Name on the Register | Image | Date listed | Location | City or town | Description |
|---|---|---|---|---|---|---|
| 1 | Acadian Historic Buildings | Acadian Historic Buildings | December 13, 1977 (#77000062) | North of Van Buren on U.S. Route 1; 47°12′17″N 67°59′26″W | Van Buren | Buildings at the Acadian Village Museum |
| 2 | Acadian Landing Site | Acadian Landing Site | September 20, 1973 (#73000098) | East of Madawaska on the St. John River off U.S. Route 1; 47°21′10″N 68°16′23″W | Madawaska | |
| 3 | Amazeen House | | September 11, 1986 (#86002470) | 15 Weeks St. 46°07′08″N 67°50′17″W | Houlton | |
| 4 | Anderson Bros. Store | | January 11, 2001 (#00001635) | 280 Main St. 47°02′20″N 68°08′28″W | Stockholm | |
| 5 | Aroostook County Courthouse and Jail | Aroostook County Courthouse and Jail | January 26, 1990 (#89002340) | Court St. 46°07′29″N 67°50′23″W | Houlton | |
| 6 | Big Black Site | Big Black Site | September 9, 1975 (#75000090) | Address Restricted | Eagle Lake | |
| 7 | Bridgewater Town Hall and Jail | | January 26, 1990 (#89002339) | U.S. Route 1; 46°14′45″N 67°50′50″W | Bridgewater | |
| 8 | Cary Library | Cary Library | June 25, 1987 (#87000929) | 107 Main St. 46°07′31″N 67°50′17″W | Houlton | |
| 9 | Church of the Advent | | June 21, 1991 (#91000767) | Church St., 1 block south of its junction with State Route 229; 46°54′38″N 67°49′30″W | Limestone | |
| 10 | Nicholas P. Clase House | | October 16, 1989 (#89001699) | Capitol Hill Rd. 46°56′30″N 68°07′22″W | New Sweden | |
| 11 | Edward L. Cleveland House | | June 12, 1987 (#87000939) | 87 Court St. 46°07′02″N 67°50′28″W | Houlton | |
| 12 | Jean-Baptiste Daigle House | | October 16, 2013 (#13000833) | 4 Dube St. 47°15′30″N 68°35′23″W | Fort Kent | |
| 13 | Donovan-Hussey Farms Historic District | | February 13, 2009 (#09000012) | 546 and 535 Ludlow Rd. 46°08′50″N 67°53′32″W | Houlton | |
| 14 | Beecher H. Duncan Farm | | February 11, 2009 (#09000011) | 26 Shorey Rd. 46°35′38″N 67°58′59″W | Westfield | |
| 15 | The Elms | | July 22, 2009 (#09000549) | 59 Court St. 46°07′18″N 67°50′24″W | Houlton | |
| 16 | First National Bank of Houlton | | September 20, 1973 (#73000099) | Market Sq. 46°07′25″N 67°50′42″W | Houlton | |
| 17 | Former Town Office and Jail | | April 4, 2019 (#100003587) | 47 Burleigh St. 46°00′36″N 68°16′08″W | Island Falls | |
| 18 | Fort Fairfield Public Library | Fort Fairfield Public Library | January 5, 1989 (#88003021) | Main St. 46°46′20″N 67°50′04″W | Fort Fairfield | |
| 19 | Fort Kent | Fort Kent | December 1, 1969 (#69000005) | At the confluence of Fish and St. John Rivers; 47°15′10″N 68°35′42″W | Fort Kent | |
| 20 | Fort Kent Railroad Station | Fort Kent Railroad Station | April 21, 1989 (#89000249) | Junction of Main and Market Sts. 47°15′27″N 68°35′23″W | Fort Kent | |
| 21 | Freeman Barn | | January 17, 2017 (#100000522) | 1533 Aroostook Rd. 47°09′21″N 68°35′30″W | Wallagrass | |
| 22 | Frenchville Railroad Station and Water Tank | | June 20, 1995 (#95000723) | 308 U.S. Route 1; 47°16′47″N 68°23′20″W | Frenchville | |
| 23 | Gayety Theatre | | March 20, 2026 (#100012834) | 44 Main Street; 47°09′21″N 67°56′00″W | Van Buren | |
| 24 | Governor Brann School | Governor Brann School | December 23, 1993 (#93001432) | Eastern side of U.S. Route 1, 1.25 miles south of its junction with Madore Rd. 47°07′18″N 67°57′42″W | Cyr Plantation | Listed in Van Buren; building is town hall of Cyr Plantation. |
| 25 | Gray Memorial United Methodist Church and Parsonage | Gray Memorial United Methodist Church and Parsonage | June 20, 1995 (#95000725) | 8 Prospect St. 46°51′37″N 68°01′02″W | Caribou | |
| 26 | Gustaf Adolph Lutheran Church | Gustaf Adolph Lutheran Church | June 20, 1997 (#97000608) | Eastern side of Capitol Hill Rd., 0.5 miles north of its junction with State Route 161; 46°56′19″N 68°07′14″W | New Sweden | |
| 27 | Island Falls Opera House | Island Falls Opera House | July 19, 1984 (#84001359) | Patten Rd. and Sewall St. 46°00′31″N 68°16′13″W | Island Falls | |
| 28 | Pehr J. Jacobson House | | February 7, 2007 (#07000013) | 452 New Sweden Rd. 46°57′14″N 68°08′31″W | New Sweden | |
| 29 | Larsson-Noak Historic District | | July 26, 1989 (#89000847) | Station Rd. northeast of New Sweden; 46°56′48″N 68°06′15″W | New Sweden | |
| 30 | A. B. Leavitt House | | June 20, 1986 (#86001336) | State Route 158; 45°52′22″N 68°23′21″W | Sherman | |
| 31 | Walter P. Mansur House | Walter P. Mansur House | February 9, 1990 (#89002342) | 10 Water St. 46°07′35″N 67°50′26″W | Houlton | |
| 32 | Maple Grove Friends Church | | July 5, 2000 (#00000764) | Western side of U.S. Route 1A, 0.25 miles north of its junction with Upcountry (Fairmount Rd.); 46°42′21″N 67°52′13″W | Maple Grove | |
| 33 | Market Square Historic District | Market Square Historic District | June 22, 1980 (#80000214) | Market Sq. and Main, Water, and Court Sts. 46°07′34″N 67°50′24″W | Houlton | |
| 34 | Isaie and Scholastique Martin House | Isaie and Scholastique Martin House | December 23, 2009 (#09001147) | 137 Saint Catherine St. 47°21′17″N 68°20′16″W | Madawaska | |
| 35 | Fortunat O. Michaud House | | January 26, 1990 (#89002343) | 231 Main St. 47°09′28″N 67°56′16″W | Van Buren | |
| 36 | Monticello Grange No. 338 | | July 5, 2000 (#00000760) | Main St., 0.7 miles south of its junction with Muckatee Rd. 46°18′26″N 67°50′29″W | Monticello | |
| 37 | Oakfield Station | Oakfield Station | June 25, 1987 (#87000928) | Station St. 46°05′52″N 68°09′21″W | Oakfield | |
| 38 | Anders and Johanna Olsson Farm | | March 7, 1996 (#96000245) | 114 West-Lebanon Rd. 46°57′56″N 68°10′03″W | New Sweden | |
| 39 | Our Lady of Mount Carmel Catholic Church | Our Lady of Mount Carmel Catholic Church | October 15, 1973 (#73000100) | U.S. Route 1; 47°16′45″N 68°06′29″W | Grand Isle | Home to the Musée Culturel du Mont-Carmel |
| 40 | Pelletier - Marquis House | | March 20, 2026 (#100012835) | 534 Main Street; 47°14′12″N 68°18′02″W | Saint Agatha | |
| 41 | Presque Isle National Bank | | July 31, 1986 (#86002106) | 422 Main St. 46°40′49″N 68°00′56″W | Presque Isle | |
| 42 | Blackhawk Putnam Tavern | Blackhawk Putnam Tavern | January 30, 1976 (#76000087) | 22 North St. 46°07′43″N 67°50′37″W | Houlton | |
| 43 | Reed School | | November 29, 2001 (#01001270) | U.S. Route 1, 0.1 miles south of its junction with Lycette Rd. 45°56′26″N 67°49′49″W | North Amity | |
| 44 | Philo Reed House | Philo Reed House | April 4, 1986 (#86000673) | 38 Main St. 46°46′03″N 67°49′12″W | Fort Fairfield | |
| 45 | Roosevelt School | | June 27, 2007 (#07000598) | Eastern side of U.S. Route 1A; 47°07′08″N 67°53′35″W | Hamlin | |
| 46 | Roosevelt School | | December 17, 1992 (#92001706) | Southern side of State Route 161 0.1 miles east of private road 861; 47°12′31″N 68°48′19″W | St. John Plantation | |
| 47 | St. David Catholic Church | St. David Catholic Church | October 2, 1973 (#73000101) | East of Madawaska on U.S. Route 1; 47°20′57″N 68°16′39″W | Madawaska | |
| 48 | St. John Catholic Church | | February 12, 2003 (#03000017) | St. John Rd. 47°13′12″N 68°45′50″W | St. John Plantation | |
| 49 | William Sewall House | William Sewall House | April 12, 1982 (#82000740) | 1027 Crystal Road; 46°00′30″N 68°16′11″W | Island Falls | |
| 50 | John J. and Martha Sodergren Homestead | | January 4, 2007 (#06001222) | ME 161; 47°02′11″N 68°10′34″W | Stockholm | |
| 51 | Stockholm Mountain Fire Tower | | December 29, 2025 (#100012449) | 305 Donworth Street; 47°02′55″N 68°07′47″W | Stockholm | |
| 52 | Sunset Lodge | | November 10, 1994 (#94001304) | 0.5 miles (0.80 km) south of State Route 161, on the eastern shore of Madawaska Lake; 47°01′52″N 68°11′36″W | Stockholm | |
| 53 | Timmerhuset | | August 23, 1973 (#73000102) | Jemtland Rd. 46°57′10″N 68°08′43″W | New Sweden | |
| 54 | Unitarian Church of Houlton | Unitarian Church of Houlton | June 25, 1987 (#87000945) | Military St. 46°07′27″N 67°50′15″W | Houlton | |
| 55 | U.S. Inspection Station-Fort Fairfield, Maine | U.S. Inspection Station-Fort Fairfield, Maine | September 10, 2014 (#14000555) | Boundaryline Rd. 46°45′57″N 67°47′24″W | Fort Fairfield | |
| 56 | U.S. Inspection Station-Limestone, Maine | U.S. Inspection Station-Limestone, Maine | September 10, 2014 (#14000556) | ME 229; 46°55′29″N 67°47′24″W | Limestone | |
| 57 | U.S. Inspection Station-Orient, Maine | U.S. Inspection Station-Orient, Maine | September 10, 2014 (#14000557) | Boundary Line Road; 45°49′01″N 67°46′53″W | Orient | |
| 58 | US Post Office-Presque Isle Main | | May 9, 1986 (#86001034) | 23 2nd St. 46°40′53″N 68°01′07″W | Presque Isle | |
| 59 | White Memorial Building | | January 15, 1980 (#80000376) | 109 Main St. 46°07′33″N 67°50′17″W | Houlton | Houses the Aroostook County Art and Historical Museum |
| 60 | Benjamin C. Wilder House | | June 12, 1987 (#87000946) | 1267 Main St. 46°47′20″N 68°09′21″W | Washburn | |

== Former listings ==
| | Name on the Register | Image | Date listed | Date removed | Location | City or town | Description |
|---|---|---|---|---|---|---|---|
| 1 | Corriveau Mill | | October 28, 1994 (#94001246) | December 18, 2013 | Southern side of U.S. Route 1, 0.3 miles southwest of its junction with Paridis Rd. 47°16′53″N 68°24′47″W | Upper Frenchville | 1907 mill; torn down in 2005. |
| 2 | Elmbrook Farm Barn | | January 10, 1986 (#86000072) | December 18, 2013 | Parsons Rd. 46°42′26″N 68°01′23″W | Presque Isle | 1891 barn; deteriorated and collapsed in 2002. |
| 3 | Lagassey Farm | | January 21, 2009 (#08001356) | September 21, 2020 | 786 Main St. 47°12′56″N 68°16′14″W | St. Agatha | |
| 4 | McElwain House | | April 12, 1982 (#82000739) | July 14, 2015 | 11 West Presque Isle Rd. 46°49′57″N 68°00′40″W | Caribou | Now the Northern Maine Development Commission offices. |
| 5 | Oakfield Grange No. 414 | Oakfield Grange No. 414 | October 4, 2006 (#06000920) | March 21, 2023 | 89 Ridge Rd. 46°05′54″N 68°09′05″W | Oakfield | |
| 6 | Smith Bridge | Smith Bridge | April 2, 1993 (#93000202) | December 18, 2013 | Lowery Rd. at its junction with Foxcroft Rd., across the Meduxnekeag River; 46°10′52″N 67°48′16″W | Houlton | A 1910 two-span Warren through truss bridge; dismantled in 1993. |
| 7 | Violette House | | May 17, 1976 (#76000088) | December 18, 2013 | 464 Main St. 47°09′58″N 67°56′35″W | Van Buren | A mid-19th century Acadian log house; disassembled and stored in 1984. |
| 8 | Watson Settlement Bridge | Watson Settlement Bridge | February 16, 1970 (#70000039) | March 21, 2023 | 2 miles southeast of Littleton over the Meduxnekeag River; 46°12′36″N 67°48′03″W | Littleton | Destroyed in a 2021 fire. |

== See also ==
- List of National Historic Landmarks in Maine
- National Register of Historic Places listings in Maine
