= Jacobson House =

Jacobson House may refer to:

- Jacobson House (Tucson, Arizona), NRHP-listed in Pima County
- Pehr J. Jacobson House, New Sweeden, Aroostook County, Maine, NRHP-listed
- Jacob Jacobson House, Amasa, Iron County, Michigan, NRHP-listed
- Nettie Jacobson House, Grandin, Carter County, Missouri, NRHP-listed
- Oscar B. Jacobson House, Norman, Cleveland County, Oklahoma, NRHP-listed in Cleveland County
- Hyrum and Selma Erickson Jacobson House, Sandy, Salt Lake County, Utah, NRHP-listed
- Jacobson House (Old Dominion University), Norfolk, Virginia, home of President of Old Dominion University
- Jacobson House and Mill Site, Burnett County, Wisconsin, NRHP-listed in Burnett County
