= Maine Acadian Culture =

Coordinates: 47.353327°N 68.273302°W

Maine Acadian Culture is an affiliated area of the United States national park system, which ties together a variety of sites on the U.S. side of the Saint John River Valley on the Maine–New Brunswick border. The common history of Acadians on both sides of the river is best understood by visiting and learning about sites and events in both Maine and New Brunswick, as well as Nova Scotia. However, the U.S. federal mandate ends at the border, hence the name of this affiliated unit. Its management is overseen by Acadia National Park, the closest staffed U.S. national park system unit.

Sites included in the decentralized unit include:

- Acadian Landing Site, also known as the Acadian Cross Historic Shrine (coordinates listed at top-of-page)
- Tante Blanche Museum
- Fred Albert House
- Madawaska School District No. 1
- Fort Kent Blockhouse
- Fort Kent Railroad Station
- Governor Brann Schoolhouse
- Acadian Village
- Musée Culturel du Mont-Carmel
- St. Agathe Museum House
- B&A Railroad Turntable
- Frenchville Caboose and Water Tower
- Allagash Historical Society Museum
- Le Club Français
- Pelletier-Marquis House
