= Donovan House =

Donovan House may refer to:

- Donovan-Hussey Farms Historic District, Houlton, Maine, including the Donovan House/Farm, listed on the National Register of Historic Places (NRHP)
- Donovan-Mayer House, Helena, Montana, NRHP-listed in Lewis and Clark County
- J. J. Donovan House, also known as Donovan House, in Bellingham, Washington, NRHP-listed
- Donovan House (Washington, D.C.), a hotel
