= Beecher H. Duncan Farm =

- U.S. National Register of Historic Places
- U.S. Historic district
- Location within Maine Location within the United States
- Location: 26 Shorey Rd., Westfield, Maine
- Coordinates: 46°35′38″N 67°58′59″W
- Area: 129 acres (52 ha)
- Built: 1910
- Architectural style: Queen Anne, Gambrel-roof barn
- NRHP reference No.: 09000011
- Added to NRHP: February 11, 2009

The Beecher H. Duncan Farm, also known as Brookvale Farm, is a historic farm property at 26 Shorey Road in Westfield, Maine. Built in 1910-12, the farm complex (consisting of a house, cottage, barn, and modern garage), it is a well-preserved family farm dating to the period of Aroostook County's heyday as a potato growing area. It was listed on the National Register of Historic Places in 2009.

== Description and history ==
The Duncan Farm is set on 129 acres (52 ha) of land in north-central Westfield, abutting the town line with Presque Isle. The farmstead is set on the east side of Shorey Road, which runs through the property. The house is a two-story wood frame structure with vernacular Queen Anne styling. Its main gabled roofline runs east-west, with a lower projecting two-story ell to the south, and a single-story porch in the corner created by the projection. The house was built in 1912 by Henry Duncan. South of the house stands a massive gambrel-roofed barn, built by Duncan in 1910. Its west-facing main facade has a large sliding door at the center, topped by a transom window, with a smaller personnel entrance to the right. At the southeast corner of the property stands an abandoned 1-1/2 story cottage.

The core of the farm property was purchased by Henry Duncan in 1904, with a potato house and small barn (both no longer extant) standing on it, indicating it had already been partly cleared and cultivated. Needing a larger barn to provide storage for hay and feed for his workhorses, Duncan built the large barn in 1910. The family typically planted 50 acres (20 ha) in potatoes, another 50 in hay and oats, and left the remaining land fallow. They kept cows and chickens for personal use (the latter in a shed built off the side of the barn, which has since been removed). The type of barn Duncan built fell into decline with the advent of mechanized agriculture, for which the large hay and feed storage areas were not needed. Beecher Duncan, who succeeded to the farm after his father's death in 1915, acquired a gasoline-powered tractor in 1944, sold off his workhorses, and removed stalls housing them from the barn.

== See also ==
- National Register of Historic Places listings in Aroostook County, Maine
