= John J. and Martha Sodergren Homestead =

- U.S. National Register of Historic Places
- U.S. Historic district
- Location: ME 161, Stockholm, Maine
- Area: 78.8 acres (31.9 ha)
- Built: 1884
- Architectural style: Log House
- NRHP reference No.: 06001222
- Added to NRHP: January 4, 2007

The John J. and Martha Sodergren Homestead is a historic late 19th-century farmstead in Maine State Route 161 in Stockholm, Maine. The central feature of the nearly 80-acre (32 ha) property is a modest house, built out of logs by Swedish immigrants. The property, one of the few remaining log structures built by Swedish immigrants in the state, was listed on the National Register of Historic Places in 2007

== Description and history ==
The Sodergren Homestead consists of 78.8 acres (31.9 ha) of land on the western side of the rural town of Stockholm in northern Aroostook County, Maine. The property is located on the northeast side of Maine State Route 161, with about 30 acres (12 ha) cleared for agriculture, and about 45 acres (18 ha) as woodland. The only buildings on the property are clustered near the road at the center of the agricultural area, and are all 20th-century structures, with the exception of the original main house.

The main house is a modest single-story structure, measuring about 28 by 24 feet (8.5 m × 7.3 m), three bays wide, with a side gable roof finished in wood shingles, clapboard siding, and a fieldstone foundation. A shed-roof porch extends to the rear. The house is architecturally a single log pen, with an interior log wall dividing the downstairs into two spaces, which have been further divided by frame walls into a total of four rooms; the attic also houses two small bedrooms. The log construction is exposed in one corner. The house has never had indoor plumbing.

Stockholm and other communities in the area were settled beginning in the 1870s by Swedish immigrants recruited through a state-run program that offered them land and basic provisions. Jons and Margreta Sodergren arrived in the area in 1879, and after establishing their own homestead, sent for their children. John J. and Martha (Jonson) Sodergren arrived in 1884, and built this log house the same year, according to family history. The house was occupied by two generations of descendants, until 1973. Of the known examples of early Swedish immigrant construction in northern Maine, this one is a well-preserved example that retains much of its original setting. The only significant alterations to the building were the addition and later removal of a kitchen wing on the north side, resulting in the replacement of original fabric on the house's inside north wall.

== See also ==
- National Register of Historic Places listings in Aroostook County, Maine
