= Roosevelt School (St. John, Maine) =

- U.S. National Register of Historic Places
- Location within Maine Location within the United States
- Location: ME 161 S side, .1 mi. E of private rd. 861, St. John, Maine
- Coordinates: 47°12′31″N 68°48′19″W
- Area: less than one acre
- Built: 1920
- Architectural style: Colonial Revival
- NRHP reference No.: 92001706
- Added to NRHP: December 17, 1992

The Roosevelt School is a historic former school building on Maine State Route 161 in Saint John Plantation, Maine. Built in 1920 to a standard plan and used as a school until 1969, it is the only surviving historic school building in the small rural community. It was listed on the National Register of Historic Places in 1992.

== Description and history ==
The Roosevelt School building is set on the south side of Maine Route 161, about 0.1 miles (0.16 km) east of the St. John Bible Church in the northwestern part of the small community. It is a single-story wood-frame structure, which is roughly rectangular in plan, with a projection extending across much of its front (north-facing) facade, and a small gable-roofed entry porch in front of that. The main block has a hip roof, which is continued over this projection, and there is a shed-roof dormer. The projecting section houses vestibules, closets, and bathroom facilities, and the main space is divided into two classrooms. The interior, despite alterations, retains significant elements of the original school function, including blackboards (now painted), and relatively unmodified closets and bathrooms. In some places original door and window trim is still in place, as is tongue-and-groove vertical wainscoting.

The school was built in 1920, to a plan that strongly resembles that of other rural Maine schools built around that time, and is the only school building known to survive from that period or earlier. It was designed with two classrooms, later modified to have a movable divider. It served as a school until 1969, and has most recently seen use as a private summer accommodation.

== See also ==
- National Register of Historic Places listings in Aroostook County, Maine
