= Anderson Brothers Store =

- Anderson Bros. Store
- U.S. National Register of Historic Places
- Location within Maine Location within the United States
- Location: 280 Main St., Stockholm, Maine
- Coordinates: 47°2′20″N 68°8′28″W
- Area: less than one acre
- Built: c. 1901
- Architectural style: Vernacular
- NRHP reference No.: 00001635
- Added to NRHP: January 11, 2001

The Anderson Brothers Store is a historic general store building at 280 Main Street in Stockholm, Maine, United States. Built in 1901, this 1 1/2-story wood-frame structure was the town's first general store, and is its only historic retail building. It operated until the 1950s, and now houses the Stockholm Historical Society's museum.

== Description and history ==
The Anderson Brothers Store is a 1 1/2-story vernacular wood-frame structure, with a single-story wing to the north and an attached barn to the rear. The main facade, facing east, has a projecting section with bay windows flanking a recessed entrance, topped by a shallow hip roof. The front-facing gable roof has a large cross gable on the south side, and the wing to the north has a flat roof and false front. The long south side of the building has a second entrance about halfway, and several irregularly spaced windows. The barn has a large track-mounted door. The interior of the building features original tongue-and-groove sheathing on the walls and ceiling.

The main block of the store was built c. 1901 by John and Lewis Anderson, and was the town's first general store. By 1915, the store had grown, adding the north wing to house the local post office, and with the projecting front section added. The partnership dissolved in 1910, and Lewis Anderson ran the store alone until 1918. The store was thereafter operated by a number of different owners through to the 1950s. The building was acquired in 1976 by the local historical society, which now houses its museum collection there.

It was listed on the National Register of Historic Places on January 11, 2001.

== See also ==
- National Register of Historic Places listings in Aroostook County, Maine
