= Freeman Barn =

- U.S. National Register of Historic Places
- Location within Maine Location within the United States
- Location: 1533 Aroostook Rd., Wallagrass, Maine
- Coordinates: 47°9′21″N 68°35′30″W
- Built: 1910
- Architectural style: Gothic Revival
- NRHP reference No.: 100000522
- Added to NRHP: January 17, 2017

The Freeman Barn is a historic barn at 1533 Aroostook Road in Wallagrass, Maine. Built about 1925, it is a well-preserved example of an early 20th-century Gothic-arched bank barn. It was listed on the National Register of Historic Places in 2009.

== Description and history ==
The Freeman Barn is located in central eastern Wallagrass, on the west side of Aroostook Road (Maine State Route 11) between Spruce Lane and Soldier Pond Road. The property is fronted by a modest Cape style house, with the barn set back and to its left. The barn measures 49 by 73 feet (15 m × 22 m), and is oriented with the short side facing the road. The terrain rises to the barn's left, exposing the basement on the right side, where there are entrance on the east and north sides. A main level entrance is found on the west side. The roof of the barn is in the shape of a Gothic arch, a form designed to maximize the size of the upper level hay loft. The exterior is finished in wooden clapboards.

The barn was built about 1925, and represents an innovative yet short-lived solution to meeting the needs of a diverse farm property in the harsh climate of northern Maine. The form was in short order supplanted by different methods for storing hay, and by the advent of the gasoline-powered tractor, which reduced the need for draft animals.

== See also ==
- National Register of Historic Places listings in Aroostook County, Maine
