= Sunset Lodge =

Historic house in Maine, United States

- U.S. National Register of Historic Places
- Location within Maine Location within the United States
- Nearest city: Stockholm, Maine
- Coordinates: 47°1′52″N 68°11′36″W
- Area: less than one acre
- Built: 1932
- Built by: Ward, Bruce
- NRHP reference No.: 94001304
- Added to NRHP: November 10, 1994

Sunset Lodge is a historic summer lodge on the shore of Madawaska Lake in rural northern Aroostook County, Maine. It is a peeled log structure, built in 1932 by Bruce Ward, founder of Ward Cedar Log Homes, and early marketer of log structures for recreational and year-round living. The building was listed on the National Register of Historic Places in 1994.

== Description and history ==
Sunset Lodge stands on a small parcel of landing on South Shore Road, fronting the southern shore of Madawaska Lake, about 0.5 miles (0.80 km) west of Maine State Route 161, in an unorganized township west of Stockholm. It is a rectangular single-story structure, with a gable roof, with several attached sheds. The main block and the sheds are fashioned out of peeled logs of red cedar, joined at the corners by V notches and extending beyond the joint by one to two feet. The front, facing the lake, has a pair of sash windows in the first level, and a tilting window at the attic level. The entrance is to the east of the front, set in a shed fashioned out smaller logs joined by butt joints; it is unclear if this was an original part of the design or an early addition. A small gable-roofed addition is attached at the southeast corner, and a shed-roofed screened porch, utilizing similar joinery to the entrance shed, is attached at the southwest corner. The interior is divided into two spaces on the ground floor, with a loft space in the attic that has a log railing.

Bruce Ward was born and raised in Aroostook County, and founded the Northern Cedar Company, a lumber mill, in 1927. His early business focused on the production of peeled logs for use as telephone poles, and company lore holds that excess inventory prompted him to consider using them in building construction. The first structure his company built was an American Legion hall in Yarmouth, Maine, in 1931; this summer house was built in 1932 for his family. Two houses, built for year-round occupancy, were later built for the family in Presque Isle. Ward began advertising log home kits in 1935, shipping his products as far away as Wisconsin. Ward's company was sold out of the family after his death in 1944, and is now known as Ward Cedar Log Homes.

== See also ==
- National Register of Historic Places listings in Aroostook County, Maine
