= Walter P. Mansur House =

Historic house in Maine, United States

- U.S. National Register of Historic Places
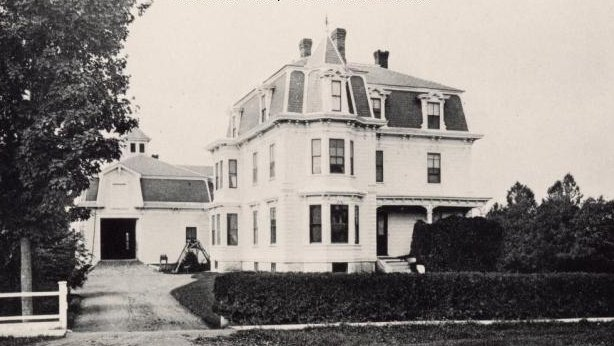
- Photo, 1895

- Location within Maine Location within the United States
- Location: 10 Water St., Houlton, Maine
- Coordinates: 46°7′35″N 67°50′26″W
- Area: less than one acre
- Built: 1880
- Architectural style: Second Empire
- NRHP reference No.: 89002342
- Added to NRHP: February 9, 1990

Walter P. Mansur House is an historic house at 10 Water Street in Houlton, Maine. Built in 1880, it is the most architecturally sophisticated Second Empire building in northern Maine. It was built for Walter P. Mansur, a prominent local businessman and banker. The house was listed on the National Register of Historic Places in February 1990.

== Description and history ==
The Mansur House is set on the west side of Water Street, just north of Houlton's central business district, Market Square. It is a rambling 2 1/2-story wood-frame structure with a rectangular main block and a 1 1/2-story rear ell that joins it to a carriage house. The main facade is three bays wide, with the left bay projecting forward and the right bays sheltered by a single-story porch supported by turned columns. The left bay corners are quoined on the first floor (as is the corner at the far right of the facade), with two stories of polygonal bay windows rising to the mansard roof. The first floor bay window has a bracketed cornice, a more elaborate version of cornices that top windows on the first floor left facade. The entire roof line is studded with double brackets. The projecting section is topped by a pyramidal roof formation above the mansard. The entire main block is finished in flushboarding.

The house was built in 1880 for Walter P. Mansur, who was in 1881 named president of the First National Bank of Houlton, and also served as president of the local water company. Mansur lived here until his death in 1900, and his widow sold the property in 1911 to the Roman Catholic parish of St. Mary's. At the time of the property's listing on the National Register of Historic Places in 1990, it was used by the parish as a school and convent. As of 2015, it is occupied by the Bowers Funeral Home.

== See also ==
- National Register of Historic Places listings in Aroostook County, Maine
