= Black Site (disambiguation) =

Black Site or blacksite may refer to:

== Places ==
- Black site, a secret military or prison site
  - CIA black sites, black sites run by the CIA during the war on terror
- Black Site (Greenwood, Mississippi), in the NRHP listings in Leflore County, Mississippi, US
- Black Site (Sidon, Mississippi), in the NRHP listings in Leflore County, Mississippi, US

== Arts and entertainment ==
- BlackSite: Area 51, a 2007 video game
- "Black Site", a 2017 episode of the Voltron: Legendary Defender television series
- Black Site (2018 film), a British science-fiction action horror film
- Black Site (2022 film), a film directed by Sophia Banks

== See also ==
- Big Black Site, an archaeological site in Maine, US
