= St. John Catholic Church (Saint John Plantation, Maine) =

Historic church in Maine, United States

- U.S. National Register of Historic Places
- Location within Maine Location within the United States
- Location: St. John Rd., St. John Plantation, Maine
- Coordinates: 47°12′19″N 68°49′8″W
- Area: 1.1 acres (0.45 ha)
- Built: 1909
- Architect: Pelletier, Aimee
- Architectural style: Colonial Revival
- NRHP reference No.: 03000017
- Added to NRHP: February 12, 2003

St. John Catholic Church is a historic church building on St. John Street (Maine State Route 116) in St. John Plantation, Maine. Built between 1909 and 1911, it is a finely detailed and handsome example of religious Colonial Revival architecture in a remote rural setting. The building was listed on the National Register of Historic Places in 2003.

Since 2007 it has been maintained by the parish of St. John Vianney based in Fort Kent, of the Diocese of Portland, having previously merged with the parish of St. Louis.

== Description ==
St. John Catholic Church is set on the north side of St. John Street, the only major roadway through the rural community of St. John Plantation in far northern Maine. It is located about 0.5 miles (0.80 km) west of the municipal offices, between the road and the Saint John River. It is a rectangular wood frame structure, one story in height, with a gable roof and a tower that projects slightly from the front (south-facing) facade. The front is three bays wide, with the outer bays housing narrow multi-panel windows with round-arch tops. The main entrance is in the base of the tower, sheltered by a rounded portico and set under a large round transom. Above this, in the extended first stage of the tower, is a large fifteen-light window topped by a round-arch transom. The first stage ends at a cornice above the main roof's ridge, with a belfry above. The sides of the belfry each have paired round-arch louvered openings. The belfry is topped by another cornice and an octagonal leaded cap, with a golden cross as a spire. The interior of the church is elaborately decorated with woodwork, plaster, and pressed tin.

This church was built in 1909-11 by local craftsmen to serve the local French Catholic population. The church interior appears to be stylistically similar to that of the 1872 St. David Catholic Church (replaced in 1911) in nearby Madawaska, one of the oldest parishes in the region.

== See also ==
- National Register of Historic Places listings in Aroostook County, Maine
