= Aroostook County Courthouse and Jail =

Historic place in Maine, United States

- U.S. National Register of Historic Places
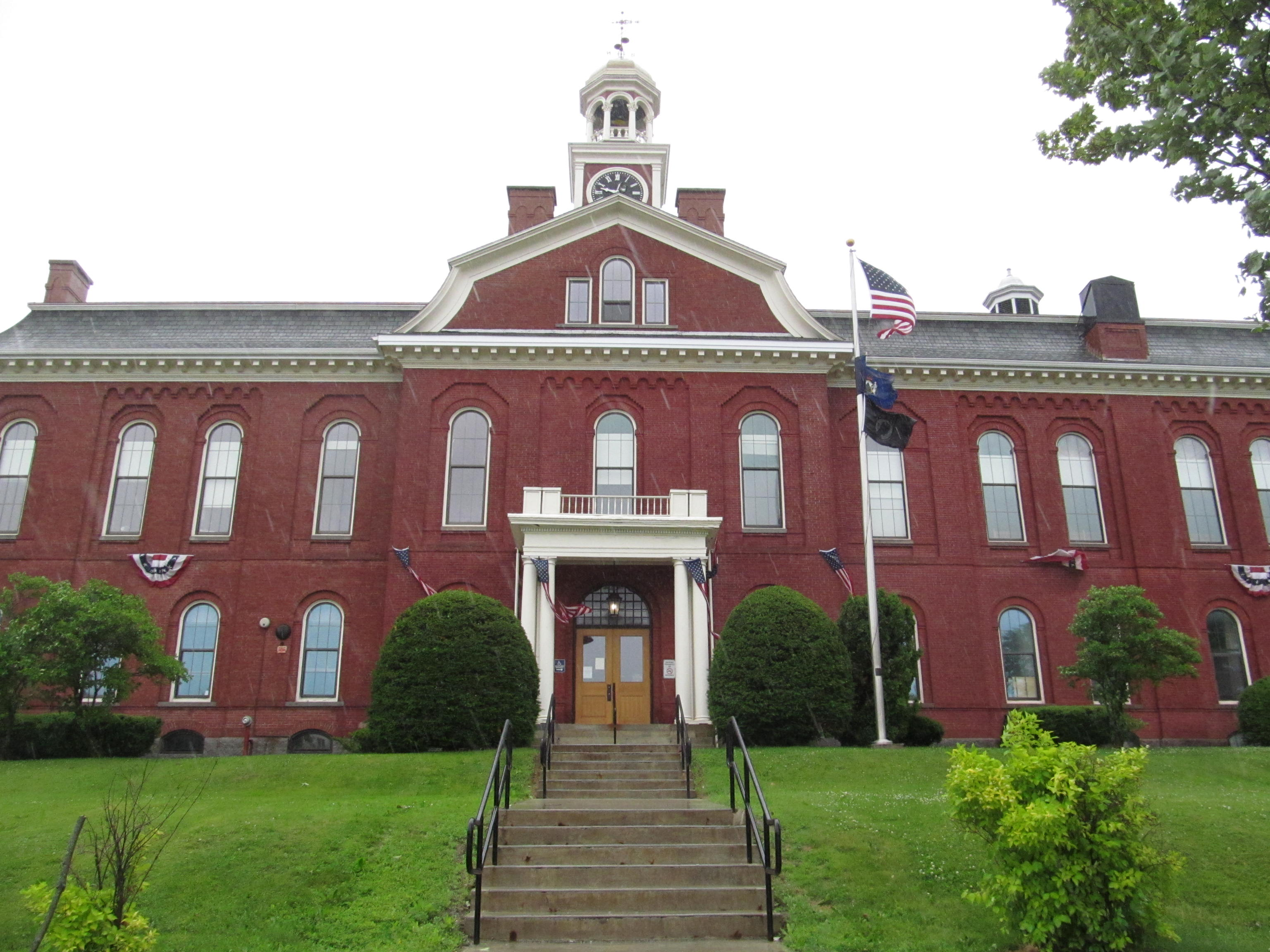

- Location within Maine Location within the United States
- Interactive map showing the location of Aroostook County Courthouse and Jail
- Location: Court Street, Houlton, Maine
- Coordinates: 46°7′29″N 67°50′22″W
- Area: 2 acres (0.81 ha)
- Built: 1859
- Architect: Gridley James Fox Bryant; Wilfred E. Mansur
- Architectural style: Colonial Revival, Italianate
- NRHP reference No.: 89002340
- Added to NRHP: January 26, 1990

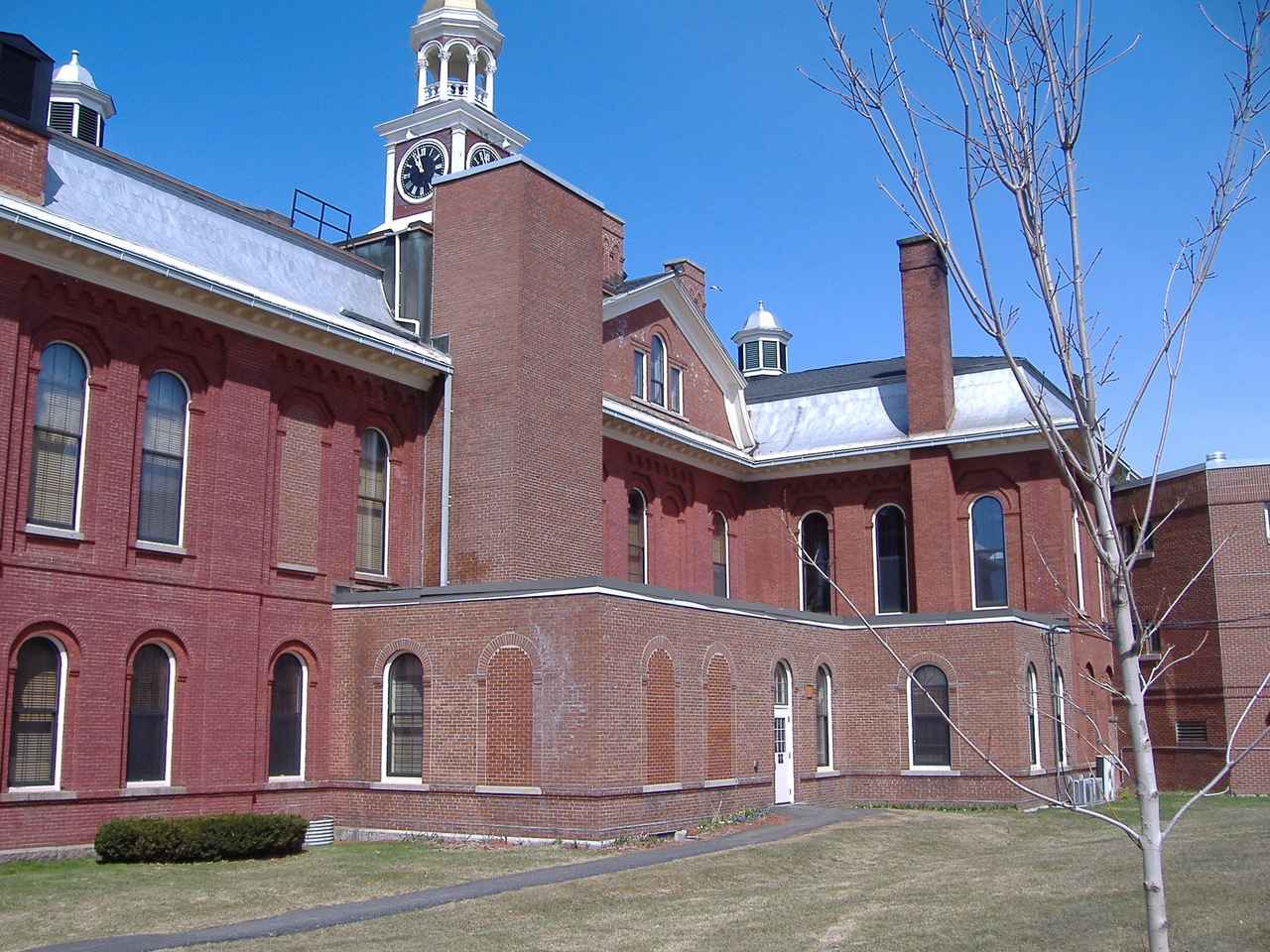
The back side of the courthouse

The Aroostook County Courthouse and Jail is located on Court Street in the center of Houlton, Maine. The building was built in 1859 and was added to the National Register of Historic Places on January 26, 1990. Its oldest portion dates to 1859, built to a design by Gridley J. F. Bryant, and was the county's first purpose-built court facility. Later additions in 1895 (designed by Maine architect Wilfred E. Mansur) and 1928 added wings that give the building its present shape. It was listed on the National Register of Historic Places in 1990.

== Description and history ==
The Aroostook County Courthouse and Jail is a sprawling complex occupying about half of a city block in the center of Houlton, Maine. The original 1859 courthouse is a rectangular brick block, with a bell-shaped mansard roof, and a cupola that now also includes a clock; the latter is an addition made during the 1895 additions to the building, in which the cupola was moved to the new center of the building. The front facade, facing west, has a central entrance pavilion, three bays wide, topped by a gable-on-mansard pediment. The entrance is in the center bay, sheltered by a portico supported by paired columns. Windows on this facade are set in slightly-recessed round-arch openings. The original 1859 entrance faces south (toward Military Street), is framed by pilasters and a segmented-arch pediment.

Aroostook County was established in 1839, during a period of heightened tension over the exact location of the border with neighboring New Brunswick. County offices were at first rented in a variety of spaces in Houlton, including the Blackhawk Putnam Tavern, the town's oldest surviving building. In 1858 the county commissioners retained Gridley J. F. Bryant, then working in Boston, to design a courthouse. The building completed in 1859 is now the southernmost part of the complex. In 1895 Wilfred E. Mansur, a Bangor architect, was retained to design an addition, which extended this building to the north, using Bryant's design vocabulary, and moved the cupola to the new center of the building and adding its clock. It also replaced the existing jail, a separate structure standing on the property since at least 1877. At this time Mansur also designed a secondary Aroostook County Courthouse in Caribou.

In 1928 a new addition to the north doubled the size of the building, and reoriented it to face toward court street, again relocating the cupola.

== See also ==
- National Register of Historic Places listings in Aroostook County, Maine
