= Acadian Village =

Acadian Village may refer to:

- Acadian Village (park), a privately owned historic site in Lafayette, Louisiana
- Acadian Village (Van Buren, Maine) a privately owned historic site on the National Register of Historic Places
- Village Historique Acadien, a privately owned historic site in Caraquet, New Brunswick
- Le Village historique acadien de la Nouvelle-Écosse, in Pubnico-Ouest, Nova Scotia
