= United Methodist Church and Parsonage =

United Methodist Church and Parsonage may refer to:

- Gray Memorial United Methodist Church and Parsonage, Caribou, Maine
- United Methodist Church and Parsonage (Mount Kisco, New York)
- Warren United Methodist Church and Parsonage, Warren, Rhode Island
