= Amazeen House =

Historic house in Maine, United States

- U.S. National Register of Historic Places
- Location within Maine Location within the United States
- Location: 15 Weeks Street, Houlton, Maine
- Coordinates: 46°7′7″N 67°50′13″W
- Built: 1882
- Architectural style: Italianate
- NRHP reference No.: 86002470
- Added to NRHP: September 11, 1986

The Amazeen House is an historic house at 15 Weeks Street in Houlton, Maine, United States. This imposing 2 1/2-story Italianate house was built c. 1882 as a speculative venture, probably intended for use as a hotel, based on the projected route of the New Brunswick Railway. It is one of Houlton's most impressive 19th-century houses, and was listed on the National Register of Historic Places in September 1986.

== Description and history ==
The Amazeen House is located in a residential area near Houlton's central business district, surrounded by early 20th-century houses. It is a 2 1/2-story wood-frame structure with a steeply pitched gable roof. The main facade, facing north, is three bays wide, with a center entrance flanked by two-story polygonal window bays. The wall of this facade is flushboarded, while other facades are finished in clapboards and novelty siding. The front is covered by a three-story porch, with square posts and balustrade. A second porch, just one story in height covers part of the rear and features Italianate brackets; part of this porch has been enclosed. A large 2 1/2-story carriage barn is connected to the rear of the house.

The house was built c. 1882 as a speculative venture by Stephen D. Amazeen, in the anticipation that the New Brunswick Railway might extend service in the direction of its location, and locate a station and junction there. This extension was never built, and the building has always seen residential use, first as a home for the Amazeens, and later as multi-unit housing.

== See also ==
- National Register of Historic Places listings in Aroostook County, Maine
