= Jean-Baptiste Daigle House =

Historic house in Maine, United States

- U.S. National Register of Historic Places
- Location within Maine Location within the United States
- Location: 4 Dube St., Fort Kent, Maine
- Coordinates: 47°15′30″N 68°35′23″W
- Area: 0.5 acres (0.20 ha)
- Built: 1839
- Architectural style: Acadian Log
- NRHP reference No.: 13000833
- Added to NRHP: October 16, 2013

The Jean-Baptiste Daigle House is a historic house at 4 Dubé Street in Fort Kent, Maine. Built c. 1840, it is a rare surviving example of an Acadian log house, and the only one known to be near its original location. It was built by one of a father-son pair, each named Jean-Baptiste Daigle, and moved a short distance about 20 years after its construction. It is now covered by weatherboard siding, obscuring its log structure. The house was listed on the National Register of Historic Places in 2013.

== Description and history ==
The Daigle House is a rectangular structure, 1 1/2 stories in height, set at the northeast corner of Dubé Street and East Main Street (United States Route 1) in Fort Kent. Its exterior is finished in Masonite siding, and it has a side-gable roof with a single brick chimney projecting near the center of the roofline. The front (west-facing) facade is symmetrical, with a center entry flanked by pairs of sash windows. The entry is sheltered by a gable-roofed porch. The side walls have two windows on each level, and a louver in the attic. The rear has a small projecting gable-roof ell, and the back door is an original thick batten door.

The interior generally follows a central hall plan, providing access to four rooms on the first floor and stairs to the second floor. The second floor has a single bedroom on the south side, and a large unfinished open area to the north, in which the house's log construction is exposed. Interior finishes vary, but notably include original wide pine flooring and exposed log structure in the downstairs northwest room.

The construction method used to build the house is a traditional Acadian piece sur piece method, in which sawn logs are place one atop the other, set in a post-and-beam frame which supports the roof. This method is distinct from other construction methods seen in the region, including those used by early English settlers and later 19th-century Swedish immigrants.

The place where the Daigles owned their land was in territory disputed between Massachusetts (which Maine was part of prior to its 1820 statehood) and New Brunswick. This dispute was resolved with the 1842 Webster-Ashburton Treaty, which established the Saint John River as the border in the Fort Kent area. The Daigles had owned land in this area since at least 1790, when they were given a British grant. Various records ascribe different construction dates to this house, ranging from 1839 to 1844, the latter being the year of the younger Jean-Baptiste's marriage. The house remained in the hands of Daigle's descendants until 2007, when it was transferred to the Fort Kent Historical Society. The society is preparing the house for use as a museum.

== See also ==
- National Register of Historic Places listings in Aroostook County, Maine
