= Oakfield Grange =

- Oakfield Grange, #414
- Formerly listed on the U.S. National Register of Historic Places
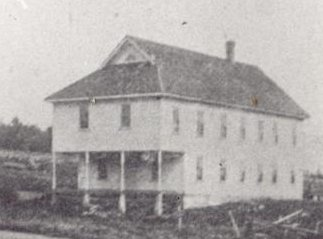
- Grange Hall, c. 1910

- Location within Maine Location within the United States
- Location: 89 Ridge Rd., Oakfield, Maine
- Coordinates: 46°5′54″N 68°9′5″W
- Area: 0.3 acres (0.12 ha)
- Built: 1906
- Architect: Oakfield Grange #414 Members
- Architectural style: Late 19th and 20th Century Revivals
- NRHP reference No.: 06000920

Significant dates
- Added to NRHP: October 04, 2006
- Removed from NRHP: March 21, 2023

The Oakfield Grange was an historic clubhouse and community meeting space at 89 Ridge Road in Oakfield, Maine. Built in 1906 by the local chapter of the Patrons of Husbandry (the Grange), the building was for many years the sole social meeting space of any size in the small rural community. It was listed on the National Register of Historic Places in 2006. It has since been demolished, and was delisted in 2023.

== Description and history ==
The Oakfield Grange was located at the southwest corner of Ridge Road and Thompson Settlement Road, a short way east of Oakland's rural village center. It was a 2 1/2-story wood-frame structure, with a main block measuring about 30 by 70 feet (9.1 m × 21.3 m), and a smaller ell attached to the east side of the rear. The roof was gabled at the rear and gable-on-hip at the front. The building was sheathed in wooden clapboards.

The local Grange chapter was organized in 1903, and built this hall in 1906 after two years of planning and fundraising. The hall was the largest meeting space in town, and held all manner of social events, including dances and private parties, were held there. From 1910 to 1964 the town held its town meetings there, and it was also used as its polling place. From 1935 to 1970 it was also used as a gymnasium by Oakfield High School, and its stage hosted performances of school theatrical and musical productions. The building's condition declined beginning in the 1980s, as agriculture in the town declined and Grange membership languished. The membership stopped holding meetings in the building in 1987. At the time of the building's listing on the National Register of Historic Places in 2006, the Grange organization had only twelve members. The building has since been demolished.

== See also ==
- National Register of Historic Places listings in Aroostook County, Maine
