= First National Bank of Houlton =

- U.S. National Register of Historic Places
- U.S. Historic district – Contributing property
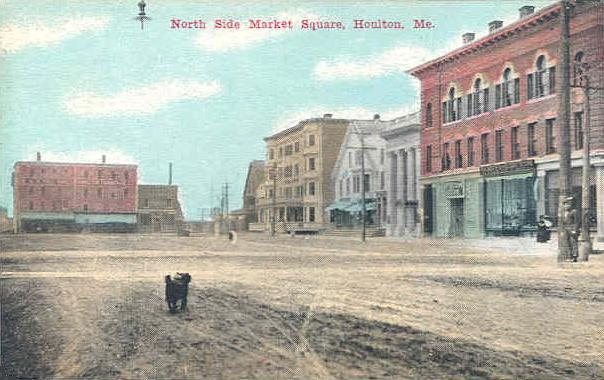
- Building is second from right in this c. 1911 postcard view

- Location within Maine Location within the United States
- Location: Market Sq., Houlton, Maine
- Coordinates: 46°7′25″N 67°50′42″W
- Area: 0.5 acres (0.20 ha)
- Built: 1907
- Architect: George M. Coombs
- Architectural style: Greek Revival
- Part of: Market Square Historic District (ID80000214)
- NRHP reference No.: 73000099

Significant dates
- Added to NRHP: September 20, 1973
- Designated CP: June 22, 1980

The First National Bank of Houlton is a historic bank building on Market Square in the center of Houlton, Maine. Built in 1907, it is an excellent local example of neo-Greek Revival architecture. One of the last commissions completed by Lewiston architect George M. Coombs, it was listed on the National Register of Historic Places in 1973. In 2020, the building's occupant bank changed its location after 113 years.

== Description and history ==
The First National Bank of Houlton building is set in a row of otherwise brick buildings on the north side of Market Square, the heart of Houlton's central business district. Sharing party walls with the neighboring buildings, it has a granite facade, prominently distinguished by a pair of pilasters at the corners, and a pair of Doric columns in the center. These support a lintel with an overhanging bracketed cornice, which is topped by four equidistant blocks separated by balustrades with metal balusters. The facade behind the columns is organized into three bays, the left two having windows with decorative metal elements between the first and second levels. The entrance is in the rightmost bay, also topped by decorative metalwork. It also has a sheltering arched marquee in which decorative metalwork detailing is repeated.

The building was designed by Lewiston architect George M. Coombs and completed in 1907. It was one of Coombs' last commissions (he died in 1909), and forms a significant and dignified part of the late-19th-century commercial landscape of Market Square.

== See also ==
- National Register of Historic Places listings in Aroostook County, Maine
