= Nicholas P. Clase House =

Historic house in Maine, United States

- U.S. National Register of Historic Places
- Location within Maine Location within the United States
- Location: Station Rd. near Capitol Hill Rd., New Sweden, Maine
- Coordinates: 46°56′30″N 68°7′22″W
- Area: 1.4 acres (0.57 ha)
- Built: 1874
- Architectural style: Maine Swedish log house
- NRHP reference No.: 89001699
- Added to NRHP: October 16, 1989

The Nicholas P. Clase House is a historic house on the south side of Station Road, west of its junction with Capitol Hill Road, in New Sweden, Maine. It is a log structure, built in 1874 by a Swedish immigrant to the area, and is one of a small number of surviving log structures in Maine built using Swedish techniques. It was listed on the National Register of Historic Places in 1989, at which time it was still in the hands of Clase's descendants.

== Description and history ==
The Clase House is a two-part 1 1/2-story structure whose oldest portion, the main block, is built out of logs. It is three bays wide, and rests on a rubble stone foundation. It is clad in weatherboard, and there are two narrow chimneys rising through the center of the roofline. The main facade, facing south has a porch supported by five log posts. A wood frame wing, built sometime before 1908, is offset from the main log block, and is also clad in weatherboard. It has a second entrance, sheltered by a hip-roof vestibule, on the south side, and a third (on the west side) originally led into a barn that is no longer standing. Satellite imagery suggests the frame wing is no longer standing.

The main block of the house was built c. 1874 by Nicholas P. Clase, who was one of the first Swedish immigrants to settle New Sweden in 1870, under a program by the state government to encourage immigration to the area which gave each family 100 acres (40 ha) and a state-built log house. Clase's house is dimensionally different from the state-provided houses, and is built using Swedish construction techniques, implying that it was already a replacement when the property was described in 1874. The property has since passed through the hands of several of his descendants.

== See also ==
- National Register of Historic Places listings in Aroostook County, Maine
