= McElwain House =

- Formerly listed on the U.S. National Register of Historic Places
- Location within Maine
- Location: 11 West Presque Isle Rd., Caribou, Maine
- Coordinates: 46°49′57″N 68°0′40″W
- Area: 0.5 acres (0.20 ha)
- Built: 1916
- Architectural style: Colonial Revival
- NRHP reference No.: 82000739

Significant dates
- Added to NRHP: April 12, 1982
- Removed from NRHP: July 14, 2015

The McElwain House is an historic house at 11 West Presque Isle Road in Caribou, Maine. Built in 1916-17 by a prosperous farmer, it is a fine local example of Colonial Revival architecture and a reminder of a period of prosperity in Aroostook County. It is home to the Northern Maine Development Commission; it was listed on the National Register of Historic Places in April 1982, and delisted in 2015.

== Description and history ==
The McElwain House is located at the northwest corner of Main Street and West Presque Isle Road, in a rural setting on the south side of Caribou. It is a large 2-1/2 story wood frame structure, with a truncated hip roof topped by a widows walk. It is finished in clapboard siding, and has an ell extending to the rear that joins it to a carriage house. The east-facing front has a broad single-story porch, supported by paired square posts, extending across the front and along the south side, ending in a porte-cochere. A large hooded dormer pierces the front roof-line, with a similarly-styled dormer to the south. Most of the windows in the house are diamond-paned, either casement or sash windows. Its interiors are richly crafted, with Tiffany glass in the cabinets, and handcrafted stone fireplaces.

The house was built in 1916-17 by John McElwain, one of the county's most successful and prosperous farmers, and included all sorts of amenities more typical for Maine's even more elaborate coastal summer houses. The McElwains were a significant social force in the area, hosting parties and other events at the house. Their fortunes declined with the advent of the Great Depression, and they converted the grand ballroom to guest rooms to make ends meet. Since 1973 the house has been used as the headquarters of the Northern Maine Development Commission, which has carefully maintained its interior and exterior.

== See also ==
- National Register of Historic Places listings in Aroostook County, Maine
