= Anders and Johanna Olsson Farm =

- U.S. National Register of Historic Places
- Location within Maine Location within the United States
- Nearest city: New Sweden, Maine
- Coordinates: 46°57′56″N 68°10′3″W
- Area: 60 acres (24 ha)
- Built: 1871
- Architectural style: Maine Swedish Log House
- NRHP reference No.: 96000245
- Added to NRHP: March 7, 1996

The Anders and Johanna Olsson Farm is a historic farmstead at 354 West Road in New Sweden, Maine, United States. It includes surviving elements of both a log house and log barn built in the late 19th century by Anders Olsson, a Swedish immigrant. The barn is the only known surviving barn in Maine to have been built during the wave of Swedish immigration in the later decades of the 19th century. The property was listed on the National Register of Historic Places in 1996.

== Description and history ==
The Olsson Farm is a 60-acre (24 ha) property located on the west side of West Road, a rural north-south road on the west side of New Sweden in northern Aroostook County, Maine. The farmstead consists of a connected series of structures, beginning with a 1-1/2 story wood frame structure that has a front-facing gable roof. A single-story hip-roofed porch extends across the east-facing front and wraps around to the south side, and there are a pair of sash windows in the gable end. A shed-roof addition extends across the north of this main block, with a shed-roof dormer in the main roof above. Behind this main block is attached a 1-1/2 log structure with a gable roof at a lower height but with the ridge in the same east-west orientation. A frame porch is attached to its south side, and there is a gabled dormer in the south-facing roof. The interior of this space has exposed log walls. A modern log breezeway joins this section to the log barn, forming the entire complex into an L shape. The barn has a log section that is 32 by 18 feet (9.8 m × 5.5 m), with a total length of 57 feet (17 m) due to a later frame extension. The barn has a gambrel roof, a c. 1915 replacement of the original gable roof.

In order to counteract the decline in its rural population due to westward migration, in 1861 the state of Maine embarked on an initiative to promote immigration to the rural northern part of the state. This led to an influx of primarily Swedish settlers, the first group arriving in 1870. Anders Olsson arrived in 1871, his wife Johanna the following year. Olsson is believed to have built the log portion of the house at a different location soon after his arrival, and the log portion of the barn in 1873; the existence and dimensions of both buildings are documented in an 1874 article. In 1889, possibly because of his growing family, Olsson built the frame portion of the house, moved the old log house to its position at the new structure's rear. Olsson's buildings demonstrate a high quality of log construction that differs notably from the cruder methods of log construction found in other parts of Maine, with particular attention given to ensuring the weather tightness of the structure. The barn is the only one known to survive from the early period of Swedish immigration to the area.

== See also ==
- National Register of Historic Places listings in Aroostook County, Maine
