= U.S. Post Office-Presque Isle Main =

- U.S. National Register of Historic Places
- Location within Maine Location within the United States
- Location: 23 Second St., Presque Isle, Maine
- Coordinates: 46°40′53″N 68°1′7″W
- Area: 0.7 acres (0.28 ha)
- Built: 1932; 1965
- Architect: Office of the Supervising Architect under James A. Wetmore; Alonzo J. Harriman Associates
- Architectural style: Classical Revival
- NRHP reference No.: 86001034
- Added to NRHP: May 9, 1986

The Presque Isle Main Post Office is located at 23 Second Street in Presque Isle, Maine. It is located in a Classical Revival brick building, constructed in 1932. The building was listed on the National Register of Historic Places in 1986.

== Description and history ==
The Presque Isle Main Post Office is located on the east side of Second Street, at the southwest corner with Church Street, one block east of the city's central business district. It is a single-story brick-and-masonry structure, whose central structure has a hip roof. Small flat-roof wings flank the main block, and a more utilitarian rectangular section extends behind the main block. The facade is oriented west toward Second Street. The central block is five bays wide, with a centered entrance framed by a Classical surround with a broken gabled pediment above. The building's corners are quoined, and there are bands of stone trim at the water table and the eave. The interior is divided into a front lobby, which extends across most of the front, a postmaster's office (occupying the rest of the front), with a large work area and loading dock behind. The lobby area has terrazzo marble flooring and marble wainscoting.

The building was designed under the supervision of Office of the Supervising Architect under James A. Wetmore, and was built in 1934, with a renovation and addition made in 1965 by Alonzo J. Harriman Associates of Auburn. It continues to be a visible symbol of the federal government's presence in the city.

== See also ==
- National Register of Historic Places listings in Aroostook County, Maine
- List of United States post offices
