= Monticello Grange No. 338 =

- Monticello Grange #338
- U.S. National Register of Historic Places
- Location within Maine Location within the United States
- Location: Main St., 0.7 mi. S of jct. with Muckatee Rd., Monticello, Maine
- Coordinates: 46°18′26″N 67°50′29″W
- Area: less than one acre
- Built: 1922
- Architectural style: Late Victorian
- NRHP reference No.: 00000760
- Added to NRHP: July 05, 2000

The Monticello Grange No. 338 is a historic civic building on United States Route 1 in the heart of Monticello, Maine. Built in 1922 by the local Grange organization, it served the town for many years as its only performance space, hosting social events, town meetings, and school graduations, and is still used for some of these purposes. It was listed on the National Register of Historic Places in 2000.

== Description and history ==
The Grange hall is located on the east side of US 1 in the main village of Monticello, just north of School Street. It is a 2 1/2-story wood-frame structure, with a front-facing gable roof, and an exterior sheathed in its original tin siding. The west-facing front facade has a centered entrance, with asymmetrically placed windows on either side. The second level has one window above the entrance and a second above the left window; there is a single window in the gable end. The interior begins with a small vestibule, with a coat room on the left and stairs to the right. A door leads into a large dining room, with bathrooms to the rear and a kitchen behind the coat room. The second floor houses the lodge hall of the Grange, with the stage at the east end of the hall.

Monticello's Grange chapter (the Patrons of Husbandry) was founded in 1899, and its first meeting hall was built that year. That building was destroyed by fire in 1921, and this building was built to replace it the following year. For many years the hall housed a variety of functions, including town offices and town meetings as well as a wide variety of social functions. Because the community's school had no large meeting space until 1974, graduations and school events were held here. Town offices were moved to an adjacent building in 1980.

== See also ==
- National Register of Historic Places listings in Aroostook County, Maine
