= The Elms (Houlton, Maine) =

Historic house in Maine, United States

- U.S. National Register of Historic Places
- Location within Maine Location within the United States
- Location: 59 Court St., Houlton, Maine
- Coordinates: 46°7′16″N 67°50′27″W
- Area: less than one acre
- Built: 1872
- Architectural style: Second Empire, Bungalow/craftsman
- NRHP reference No.: 09000549
- Added to NRHP: July 22, 2009

The Elms, also known as the Boardman J. Stevens House and the George W. Richards House, is a historic house at 59 Court Street in Houlton, Maine. Built c. 1872 as a fine example of Second Empire architecture, it underwent a significant alteration between 1906 and 1912 in which high-quality Craftsman styling was introduced to its interior. The building was listed on the National Register of Historic Places in 2009 for its architectural significance.

== Description and history ==
The Elms is set on the west side of Court Street (United States Route 1) south of Houlton's central business district, on a residential stretch of the road. It is a 2 1/2-story wood-frame structure, three bays wide, with a mansard roof and clapboard siding. A single-story porch extends across the front, topped by a shallow hip roof and supported by paired paneled square posts. The house corners have paneled pilasters matching the porch post in detail. The roof is a flared bell-cast mansard roof with asphalt shingles, with dormers topped by segmented-arch gables and framed by decorative woodwork. A two-story ell extends to the rear of the house.

The interior of the house, which follows a central hall plan, contains a mix of Second Empire and Craftsman styling. The former is represented by thick doors and high-profile trim around doorways and windows, while the latter includes embossed leather wall coverings, art glass windows, and decorative mahogany woodwork. The main staircase features a figured oak base, turned balusters, and sunburst carvings on the newel posts. The entry hall and living room both have pressed tin coffered ceilings. The living room has a fireplace decorated with brick and multicolored terra-cotta moulding and tile. The library, which was completely redone in the Craftsman style, with a coffered beam ceiling, a builtin secretary with leaded glass door, and wall sconces of iron and mica.

The Elms was built c. 1872 by Boardman J. Stevens, the owner of a local shoe and bootmaking shop, and originally included a carriage house. The property was purchased in 1901 by George W. Richards, a dry goods business owner who was one of Aroostook County's most successful businessmen of the period. Richards was responsible for the renovation of the house's interior, and for widening the front porch. The property was for some time used as a boarding house, as evidenced by numbers on some of its bedroom doors.

== See also ==
- National Register of Historic Places listings in Aroostook County, Maine
