= Acadian Landing Site =

- U.S. National Register of Historic Places
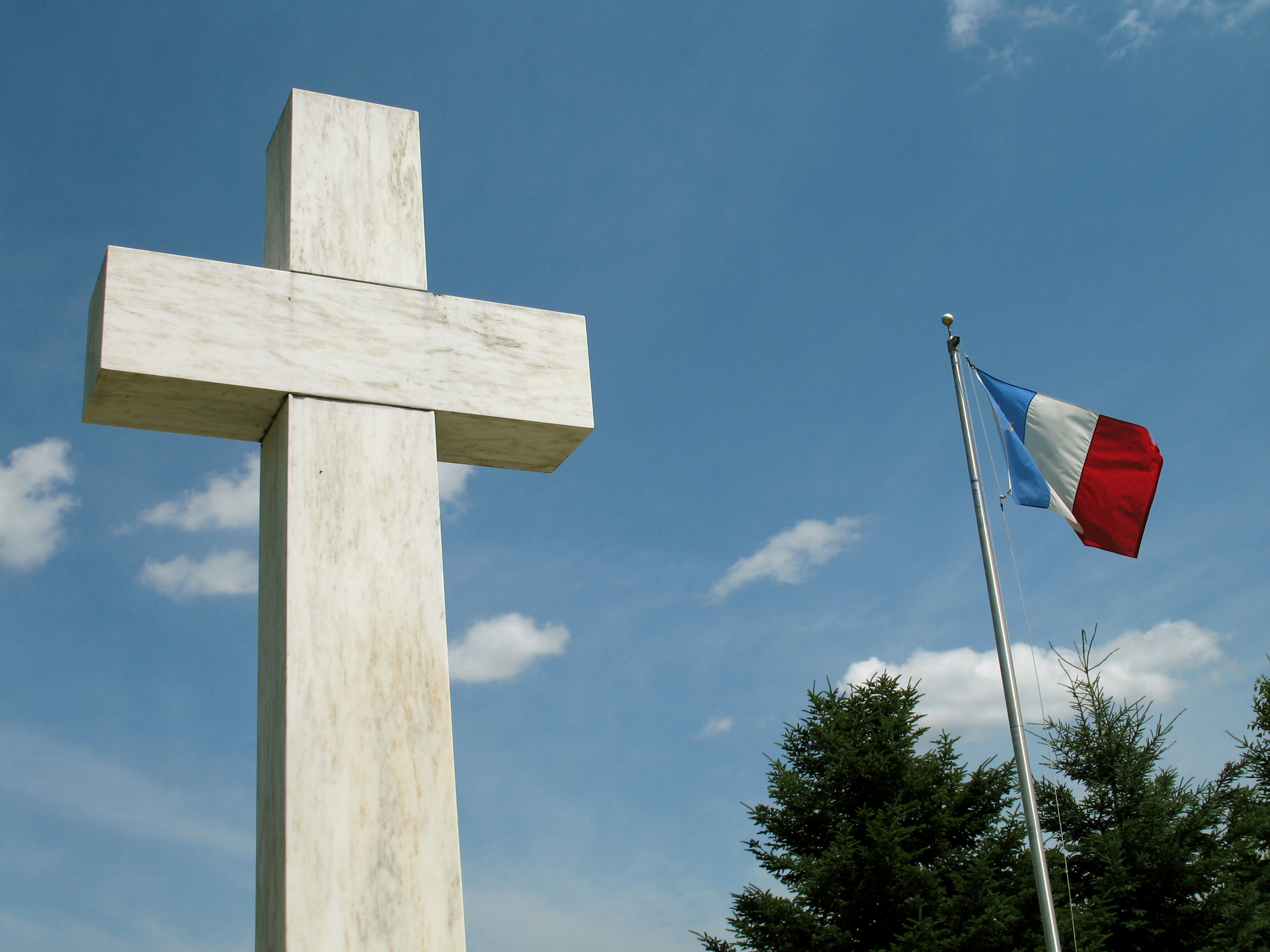

- Location within Maine Location within the United States
- Nearest city: Madawaska, Maine
- Coordinates: 47°21′10″N 68°16′23″W
- Area: 2 acres (0.81 ha)
- Built: 1785
- NRHP reference No.: 73000098
- Added to NRHP: September 20, 1973

The Acadian Landing Site, also known as the Acadian Cross Historic Shrine, is a site historically significant to the French-American Acadian population of far northern Maine. Located on the southern bank of the Saint John River east of Madawaska and marked by a large marble cross, it is the site traditionally recorded as the landing point of the first Acadians to settle this region of the upper Saint John River. The site was listed on the National Register of Historic Places in 1973.

== Description and history ==
During the French and Indian War in the late 1750s, British authorities in Nova Scotia, which then included all of present-day New Brunswick, decided to forcibly relocate the local Acadian population to other parts of the British Empire. This action had far-reaching consequences, but not all Acadians were deported, and a significant number that survived the relocation process returned to what is now New Brunswick. Following the American Revolutionary War, United Empire Loyalists who had fled the Thirteen Colonies were resettled in New Brunswick, and given land grants that sometimes included land occupied by Acadians. In many instances, these occupants were driven from the land, and were again forced to move.

In 1785, a group of twenty Acadian families led by Joseph Daigle worked their way up the Saint John River from Fredericton. According to local tradition, they ended their journey at this site, and erected a wooden cross to mark the occasion. This group formed the nucleus of settlements on both sides of the river, part of which is on the Canada–United States border, dividing the larger community. The border in this area was set by the 1842 Webster-Ashburton Treaty, after a period of border tension known as the Aroostook War.

The site is marked by a large marble cross, erected in 1922, which is located at the approximate site of the original cross as determined by local lore. It is separated from United States Route 1 by a potato field, and is accessible by a side road. A wooden platform, built in 1969, surrounds the cross, and is the occasional site of religious observances. The property is now owned and maintained by the Madawaska Historical Society. The site is also part of the Maine Acadian Culture program of the National Park Service.

== See also ==
- National Register of Historic Places listings in Aroostook County, Maine
