= Presque Isle National Bank =

- U.S. National Register of Historic Places
- Location within Maine Location within the United States
- Location: 422 Main St., Presque Isle, Maine
- Coordinates: 46°40′49″N 68°0′56″W
- Area: 0.5 acres (0.20 ha)
- Built: 1887
- NRHP reference No.: 86002106
- Added to NRHP: July 31, 1986

The former Presque Isle National Bank building is a 19th-century commercial building at 422 Main Street in Presque Isle, Maine. Built in 1887, it is one of the most architecturally significant commercial buildings of northernmost Maine, and was listed on the National Register of Historic Places in 1986 for its architecture. It presently houses the Maine Farmers Exchange on the upper level, and retail stores below.

== Description and history ==
The Presque Isle National Bank building is set on the east side of Main Street in downtown Presque Isle, in a row of brick and masonry building one to three stories in height. It is a two-story brick structure, set on a raised brick foundation, with a low-slope pitched roof, sharing party walls or directly abutting the neighboring buildings. The front facade is divided into three parts, with a central stair providing access to the second floor flanked by storefronts. The first floor consists of brick piers supporting granite lintels above the storefronts, which are plate glass and wood with recessed entries. The second-floor entrance is also recessed. Above each storefront is a three-part segmented-arch window, each with flanking brick pilasters. In the center is a brick segmented arch, under which is a granite block with the date "1887" incised on it. A belt course and corbelled cornice separate the second floor from the roof.

The commercial center of Presque Isle was completely destroyed by fire in 1884, and this building is one that was built afterward. It was built by the bank and a local businessman. The bank was a major financier of the growth of Aroostook County's potato industry in the years between 1887 and its closure in 1933. The building was also home for many years to The Northern Star, a regional newspaper. It is now home to the Maine Farmers Exchange, a business that provides supplies to the region's farmers.

== See also ==
- National Register of Historic Places listings in Aroostook County, Maine
