= Church of the Advent (Limestone, Maine) =

Historic church in Maine, United States

- U.S. National Register of Historic Places
- Location within Maine Location within the United States
- Location: Church St. 1 block S of jct. with ME 229, Limestone, Maine
- Coordinates: 46°54′38″N 67°49′30″W
- Area: less than one acre
- Built: 1881
- Architectural style: Romanesque, Gothic Revival
- NRHP reference No.: 91000767
- Added to NRHP: June 21, 1991

The Church of the Advent is a historic church building on Church Street, one block south of the junction with Maine State Route 229 in Limestone, Maine. Built in 1881, the architecturally eclectic Gothic/Romanesque building was constructed for an Episcopalian church congregation founded in 1872, which is believed to be the oldest in Limestone. The church was listed on the National Register of Historic Places in 1991.

== Architecture and building history ==
The Church of the Advent is a modest wood-frame building, with a distinctive steeply gabled roof and a small tower just to the left of the main block. The main (west-facing) facade has two tall and narrow round-headed windows, with the main entrance in a rounded opening in the tower. A narrow rectangular window is above the doorway in the tower, with an open belfry above, capped by a pyramidal roof. Behind the sanctuary is a wider modern single-story addition built of concrete blocks, with a shallow-pitch gable roof. The interior (walls and barrel-vaulted ceiling) are finished in stained tongue-and-groove woodwork, although early accounts describe the church ceiling as having been plastered. Surviving original features include wall-mounted oil lamps.

The Episcopal congregation that built the church in 1881 was founded in 1872, and is believed to be Limestone's first organized church group. It originally met in a school before having this building built. The building was originally located on the Grand Falls Road where the Protestant Cemetery continues to stand. The church was moved on log rollers, using horses to its present location over several months in 1896. It was reported in 1904 that its tower had been raised to accommodate the belfry.

== See also ==
- National Register of Historic Places listings in Aroostook County, Maine
