= California, Maine =

- Village
- Location within Maine Location within the United States
- Coordinates: 47°04′09″N 68°06′21″W
- Country: United States
- State: Maine
- County: Aroostook
- Town: Stockholm
- Elevation: 866 ft (264 m)
- Time zone: UTC-5 (Eastern (EST))
  - Summer (DST): UTC-4 (EDT)
- ZIP Code: 04783 (Stockholm)
- Area code: 207
- GNIS feature ID: 579171

California is an unincorporated village in the town of Stockholm, Aroostook County, Maine, United States.
