= Edward L. Cleveland House =

Historic house in Maine, United States

- U.S. National Register of Historic Places
- Location within Maine Location within the United States
- Location: 87 Court St., Houlton, Maine
- Coordinates: 46°7′2″N 67°50′28″W
- Area: less than one acre
- Built: 1902
- Architectural style: Colonial Revival, Queen Anne, Shingle Style
- NRHP reference No.: 87000939
- Added to NRHP: June 12, 1987

The Edward L. Cleveland House is an historic house at 87 Court Street in Houlton, Maine. A distinctive local example of Queen Anne and Colonial Revival architecture, it was built in 1902 by Edward L. Cleveland, one of Aroostook County's largest dealers in potatoes, and was listed on the National Register of Historic Places in June 1987.

== Description and history ==
The Cleveland House is a 2 1/2-story wood-frame structure, set on a brick foundation on a large grassy lot at the corner of Court and Columbia Streets. It has the asymmetrical massing typical of Queen Anne Victorians, with a conical turret at the southeast corner, and a porch that wraps around the east and north sides. Stylistically the porch is more Colonial Revival in character, with grouped Ionic columns supporting a roof that extends to a gable end at the north. The main (east-facing) facade is three bays wide, with the turret occupying the left bay, and the entrance at the center, with a projecting enclosed porch above that has a segmented-arch roof line and a pair of round-arch windows. The interior of the house features high quality period woodwork.

Edward L. Cleveland was born in Camden, Maine, and first operated a merchant business based in Boston, Massachusetts. C. 1878 he moved to Houlton, where he established a potato shipping firm that rapidly became one of the largest in Aroostook County, whose economy was then dominated by that crop. By 1908 Cleveland had warehouse capacity for 500,000 bushels, and was shipping potatoes throughout the eastern United States. He was also politically active, serving in the state legislature.

In 1902 the center of Houlton was devastated by a large fire, which consumed not only much of its business district but some of the surrounding residential areas as well. Cleveland's house was among those lost in the fire, and he soon afterward acquired the land to build the present house. The architect is not known. It remained his home until his death in 1939. It was sold out of the family by his daughter in 1960.

== See also ==
- National Register of Historic Places listings in Aroostook County, Maine
