= Roosevelt School (Hamlin, Maine) =

- U.S. National Register of Historic Places
- Location within Maine Location within the United States
- Location: Hamlin Road (US Route 1A), Hamlin, Maine
- Coordinates: 47°7′8″N 67°53′35″W
- Area: 0.2 acres (0.081 ha)
- Built: 1933
- Architectural style: Bungalow/craftsman
- NRHP reference No.: 07000598
- Added to NRHP: June 27, 2007

The Roosevelt School, now Hamlin Town Hall, is a historic former school building on United States Route 1A in Hamlin, Maine. Built in 1933, it is the best-preserved of two surviving district school buildings in the rural community. The building was listed on the National Register of Historic Places in 2007.

== Description and history ==
The former Roosevelt School building is set overlooking the Saint John River on the east side of Hamlin Road (US Route 1A), a short way north of its junction with Vaughn Road. It is a small single-story wood frame structure, with a front-facing gable roof and patterned shingle siding. Its narrow front facade consists of a center entrance, sheltered by a gable-roofed porch, flanked by sash windows. The southern facade has a bank of five sash windows. The north side of building is mostly taken up by a shed-roof continuation of the main roof, sheltering a wood storage area and two pit toilets. The building is stylistically Craftsman, with exposed rafter ends on the main roof and large brackets on the porch.

The school was built in 1933 to serve district number 2 in the town, which was incorporated as a plantation at that time. It was used as a school until 1951, when the community's schools were consolidated into a regional district. The design of the school appears to follow one of a number of standard plans commissioned by the state in 1909 (as part of a general plan to improve school conditions statewide), although it is not known which one it is. Many district schools in the smaller communities of the region were built on similar plans, including the Governor Brann School in Cyr Plantation.

== See also ==
- National Register of Historic Places listings in Aroostook County, Maine
