= Fortunat O. Michaud House =

Historic house in Maine, United States

- U.S. National Register of Historic Places
- Location within Maine Location within the United States
- Location: 231 Main St., Van Buren, Maine
- Coordinates: 47°9′28″N 67°56′16″W
- Area: less than one acre
- Built: 1912
- Architectural style: Queen Anne
- NRHP reference No.: 89002343
- Added to NRHP: January 26, 1990

The Fortunat O. Michaud is a historic house at 231 Main Street in Van Buren, Maine. Built in the 1910s by a local politician, it is the small community's most elaborate expression of Queen Anne architecture. It was listed on the National Register of Historic Places in 1990.

== Description and history ==
The Michaud House is set at the southwest corner of Poplar and Main Streets (the latter is United States Route 1)., occupying a prominent elevated site just north of Van Buren's central business district. It has a two-story main block with a hip roof and a three-story round tower projecting from the northeast corner, and a broad porch that wraps around the front and north side. The tower is shingled on the third level (the rest of the house is finished in clapboards) and is capped by a domed roof. The single story porch is supported by Tuscan columns, and echoes the circular form of the tower as it wraps around it. On the north side, a gabled projection has a window set in a deeply-recessed lancet-arched opening. A gable-roofed ell extends to the rear from the main block. The interior of the house retains much original woodwork and styling.

The house was built sometime between 1912 and 1917 by Fortunat O. Michaud, a former state legislator. The property was recorded as having a narrow house on it in 1911, which the rear ell may be all of part of; there is architectural evidence in the attic space supporting this idea. The house was sold out of the family by Michaud's daughter.

== See also ==
- National Register of Historic Places listings in Aroostook County, Maine
