= Isaie and Scholastique Martin House =

Historic house in Maine, United States

- U.S. National Register of Historic Places
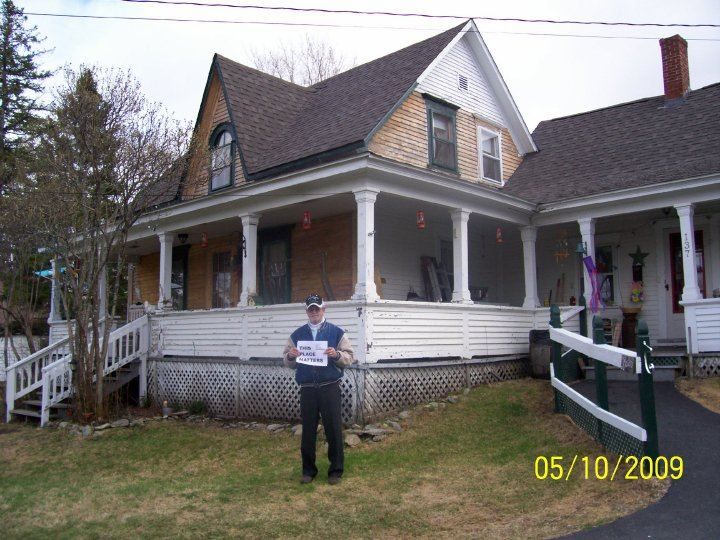

- Location within Maine Location within the United States
- Location: 137 Saint Catherine St. Madawaska, Maine
- Coordinates: 47°21′17.3″N 68°20′16.5″W
- Area: 0.7 acres (0.28 ha)
- Architectural style: Mid 19th Century Revival, Other, Acadian Log House
- NRHP reference No.: 09001147
- Added to NRHP: December 23, 2009

The Isaie and Scholastique Martin House at 137 Saint Catherine Street in Madawaska, Maine, is a well-preserved example of an Acadian log house built following traditional regional techniques. The house was listed on the National Register of Historic Places in 2009.

== Description and history ==
Isaie Martin was the grandson of Francois Martin who, as an 11-year-old, was one of the Acadians deported from Port Royal, Nova Scotia, in 1755. Francois Martin and his family were later among the first families to settle in the Saint John River Valley between the Madawaska and Green rivers, in an area that is still today heavily characterized by Acadian culture and traditions. Most of Francois' sons established farms along the Saint John River during the first three decades of the 19th century, and his grandsons and great grandsons followed suit.

The Martin House is composed of two joined log structures, the earlier of which was probably constructed between 1823 and 1844. The house features log construction cloaked by a clapboarded exterior with a steep A-frame dormer with a round arched window, and a generous wrap-around porch. On the interior, the house exhibits some unusual, probably regional, woodworking details and has a type of root cellar once commonly found in Acadian homes, but now rare. With the exception of the replacement of some of the windows, the house retains integrity of location, association, feeling, workmanship, design and materials to the period of significance, which spans the approximate dates of construction, c. 1823 to c. 1860. The house was listed in the National Register of Historic Places in 2009 for its architectural significance within the context of 19th century Acadian traditions.

== See also ==
- National Register of Historic Places listings in Aroostook County, Maine
