= Timmerhuset =

Historic house in Maine, United States

- U.S. National Register of Historic Places
- Location within Maine Location within the United States
- Nearest city: New Sweden, Maine
- Coordinates: 46°57′10″N 68°8′43″W
- Area: 5 acres (2.0 ha)
- Built: 1870
- Architectural style: Log Cabin
- NRHP reference No.: 73000102
- Added to NRHP: August 23, 1973

Timmerhuset is a historic log cabin off Jemtland Road in New Sweden, Maine. Probably built sometime between 1871 and 1875, it is the oldest known surviving example of Swedish immigrant log construction in the state. It was listed on the National Register of Historic Places in 1973.

== Description and history ==
Timmerhuset is set on a knoll overlooking the Little Madawaska River off Jemtland Road in northern New Sweden, a rural community in far northern Aroostook County, Maine. It is a modest 1 1/2-story log structure, facing south, with a side gable roof that has a small gable centered on the southern face. It is built from flat-hewn logs joined by notches; the spaces between the logs would originally have been filled with chinking materials. To the right of the entrance, the roof extends further, creating a shed-like projection that is finished in vertical boards.

The state of Maine in the 1860s authorized a program to recruit homesteaders to some of its rural areas. Under this program a Swedish population was settled in northern Aroostook County. Although they were supposed to be provided with tools and a state-built cabin, only six cabins had been built when the first small band of Swedish immigrants arrived in 1870. Larger groups came in the following years, and it is likely that someone from one of those later groups built this cabin. It is the only remaining structure in the state that was built by Swedish immigrants that is unambiguously still an early cabin (later examples of Swedish log construction exist, but have generally been incorporated into houses).

== See also ==
- National Register of Historic Places listings in Aroostook County, Maine
