= Hotel Zena, a Viceroy Urban Retreat =

Hotel in Washington, D.C., United States

Hotel Zena
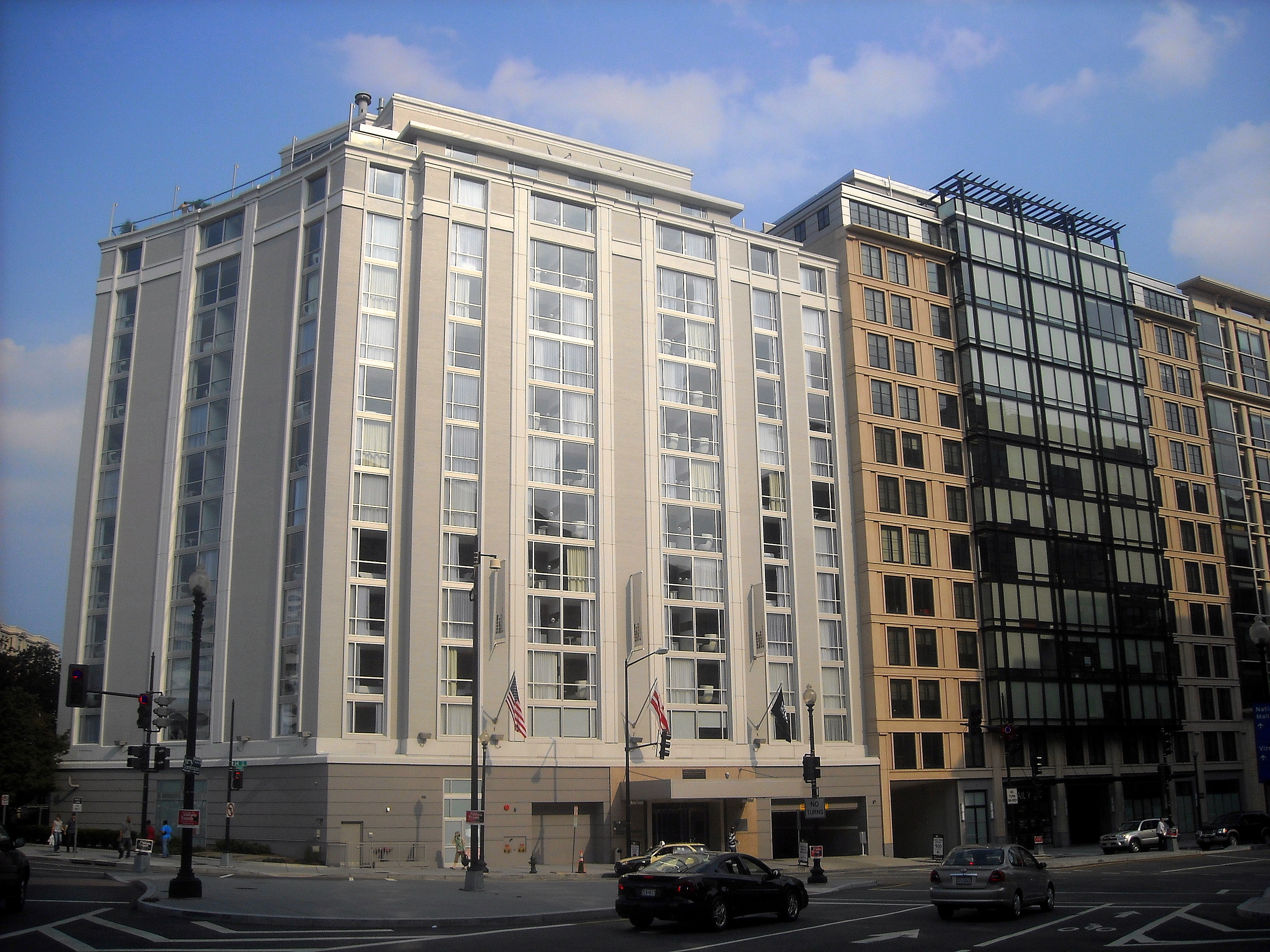

- Location within the United States

General information
- Location: 1155 14th Street Northwest Washington, D.C. 20005-4111, United States
- Coordinates: 38°54′18″N 77°1′53″W
- Owner: Pebblebrook Hotel Trust
- Operator: Viceroy Hotels & Resorts

Other information
- Number of rooms: 193
- Number of restaurants: 1

Website
- www.viceroyhotelsandresorts.com/zena/

The Hotel Zena is a hotel in Washington, D.C., United States. It is located at 1155 14th Street Northwest. The hotel has 193 rooms and 2 bars.

== History ==
The hotel opened in 1974 as the Quality Inn Downtown. By 1984, it was the Holiday Inn Thomas Circle. By 1995, it operated as the Holiday Inn Franklin Square. In 1999, when it was known as the Capital City Hotel, it was purchased by Wright Investment Properties and renamed the Holiday Inn Washington Downtown. The hotel was renovated and reopened in 2008, managed by Thompson Hotels, as the Donovan House Hotel. Kimpton Hotels & Restaurants took over management in 2012, and the hotel was renamed the Kimpton Donovan Hotel. Viceroy Hotels & Resorts took over management in July 2019, and the hotel was renamed The Donovan while it underwent renovation, before being rebranded as Hotel Zena on October 8, 2020. The hotel is themed to female empowerment, with its owner calling it "the first hospitality establishment solely dedicated to celebrating the accomplishments of women".
