= Market Square Historic District (Houlton, Maine) =

Historic district in Maine, United States

- U.S. National Register of Historic Places
- U.S. Historic district
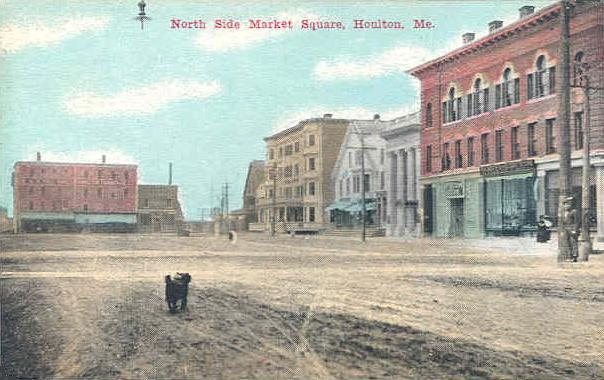
- Postcard view of Market Square, 1911

- Location within Maine Location within the United States
- Location: Market Sq., Main, Water and Court Sts., Houlton, Maine
- Coordinates: 46°7′34″N 67°50′24″W
- Area: 8 acres (3.2 ha)
- Built: 1885
- Architect: Multiple
- Architectural style: Colonial Revival, Late Victorian
- NRHP reference No.: 80000214
- Added to NRHP: June 22, 1980

The Market Square Historic District of Houlton, Maine encompasses that town's historic late-19th century central business district. Centered on the junction of Market Square, Court Street, Water Street, and Main Street, it includes a relatively cohesive assortment of brick and masonry commercial buildings, designed by architects and built between 1885 and 1910, following the arrival of the Bangor and Aroostook Railroad. The district was listed on the National Register of Historic Places in 1980.

== Description and history ==
Houlton was one of the first communities settled in southern Aroostook, and is still its most important economic center. The town was incorporated in 1831, but grew very slowly until 1870, when the New Brunswick Railway was extended westward into Maine. In 1893 the Bangor and Aroostook Railroad arrived in Houlton from the west, kicking of a commercial building boom. The downtown area which developed around Market Square was affected by fires in 1884 and 1902, which mainly resulted in the destruction of older wood-frame buildings. The result is a cohesive collection of brick and masonry buildings generally between two and four stories in height, built with a variety of architectural styles popular at the time.

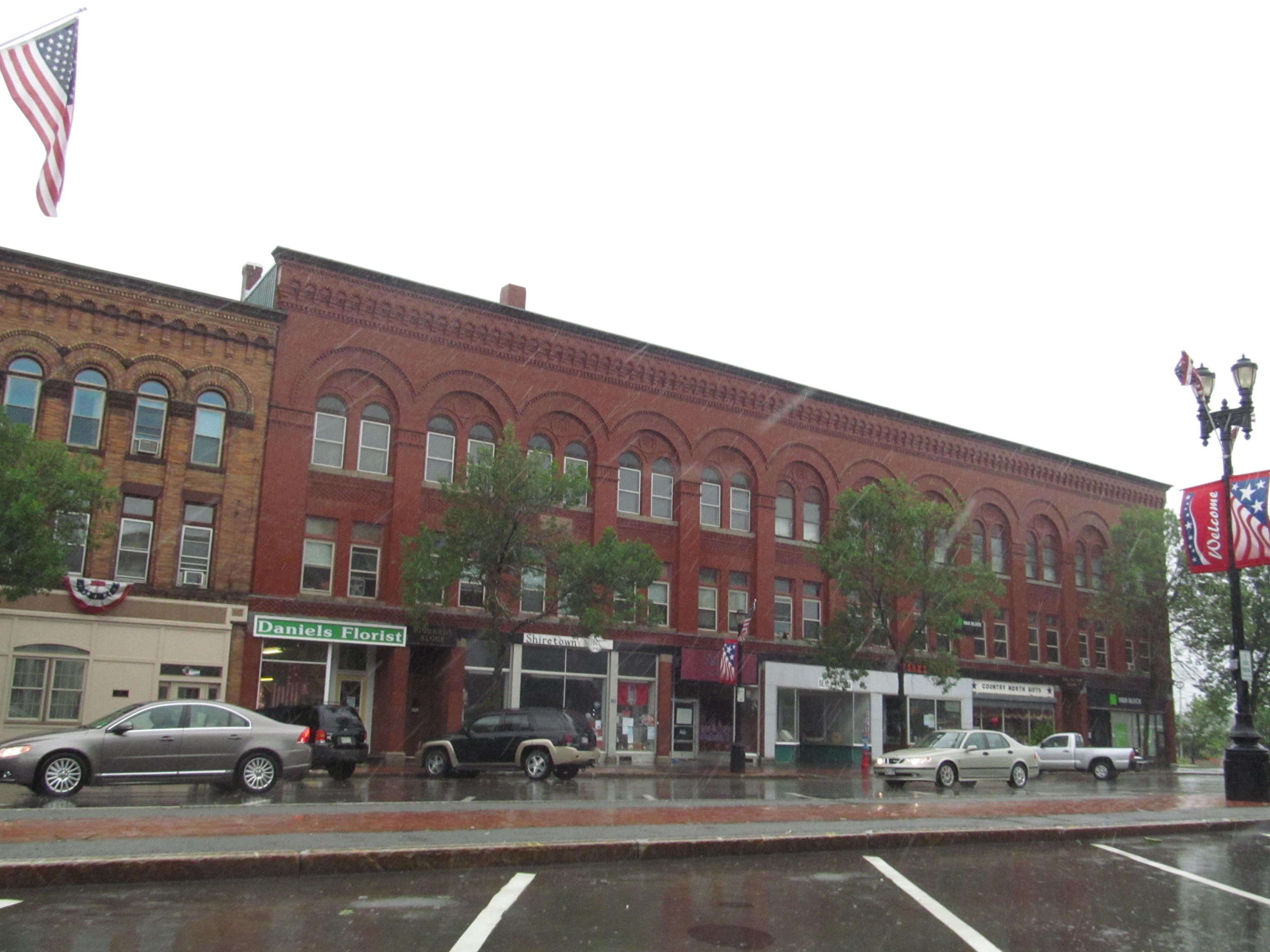
Market Square, 2014

The district is centered on the intersection of four roads just east of Pearce Brook, which snakes through the town, and a short way south of Interstate 95, the region's only highway. Market Square, the western branch of the junction, is a broad open area with parking at its center, lined on the east and west with historical buildings. Notable among these is the First National Bank of Houlton, the only building on the square with a granite facade; it was designed by George M. Coombs and built in 1907. Three of the eight buildings on the square were designed by Wilfred E. Mansur of Bangor, although they are each in different styles. Three buildings line the west side of Court Street just south of the intersection, and three more are north of the junction on Water Street, including the Romanesque Revival Post Office and Custom House. Main Street east of the junction is lined on both sides with historic buildings to Broadway and Powers Street, including several more designed by Mansur and Coombs. These include the Mansur-designed fire station, and the Colonial Revival Elks Lodge, which anchors the eastern end of the district.

== See also ==
- National Register of Historic Places listings in Aroostook County, Maine
