= Blackhawk Putnam Tavern =

- U.S. National Register of Historic Places
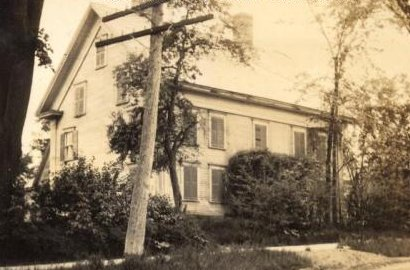
- The tavern c. 1920

- Location within Maine Location within the United States
- Location: 22 North St., Houlton, Maine
- Coordinates: 46°7′43″N 67°50′37″W
- Area: 22 North Street
- Built: 1813
- Architect: Samuel Wormwood
- Architectural style: Federal; Greek Revival
- NRHP reference No.: 76000087
- Added to NRHP: January 30, 1976

The Blackhawk Putnam Tavern is an historic house at 22 North Street in Houlton, Maine, United States. Built in 1813, it is the oldest standing building in Aroostook County. In the mid-19th century, it served as a tavern on the military road, and one of its owners was Blackhawk Putnam, a veteran of the American Civil War. It was listed on the National Register of Historic Places on January 30, 1976.

== Description and history ==
The Blackhawk Putnam Tavern is set on the west side of North Street (United States Route 1), a short way north of a bend in the Meduxnekeag River, which winds through Houlton. It is a 3 1/2-story wood-frame structure, with two fully framed stories, and an additional 1 1/2 under the side-gable roof. There are two interior brick chimneys. The main facade faces east, and is five bays wide, with the center entry sheltered by a 20th-century Colonial Revival portico. Windows are symmetrically spaced, with a slightly wider gap on either side of the center bay. The corners of the building have wide corner boards, and the front and rear have a broad entablature below the roof line. The interior of the building follows a typical Federal-period center-hall plan, with two rooms on either side of the hall at each level. Trim, both interior and exterior, is a combination of Federal and Greek Revival styling.

The tavern was built in 1813 by Samuel Wormwood, a master carpenter originally from Alfred, Maine, for Aaron Putnam, who had settled in the Houlton area in 1805. It was not the first house built in Houlton by Wormwood; a house built for the local doctor in 1812 burned down in 1879. Houlton was connected to the rest of Maine by a military road built in 1828, and it is probable that the house began to serve as a tavern around then, as it was likely the largest house in the small community. The house was the scene of several sessions of the Washington County district court before the area was set off as Aroostook County in 1839. It then held sessions of that county's court for a number of years, and was owned by John Varnum Putnam, the county sheriff for many years. Putnam's son, Blackhawk, commanded a company of Maine volunteer infantry in the American Civil War. The property was used as a restaurant for a time after his death. It is now a private residence and home of New Day, a social services agency.

== See also ==
- National Register of Historic Places listings in Aroostook County, Maine
