= Donovan–Hussey Farms Historic District =

Historic district in Maine, United States

- U.S. National Register of Historic Places
- U.S. Historic district
- Location within Maine Location within the United States
- Location: 546 and 535 Ludlow Rd., Houlton, Maine
- Coordinates: 46°9′7″N 67°53′49″W
- Area: 83 acres (34 ha)
- Built: 1906
- Architectural style: Colonial Revival, Gambrel roof barn
- NRHP reference No.: 09000012
- Added to NRHP: February 13, 2009

The Donovan–Hussey Farms Historic District encompasses a pair of 19th-century farm properties in rural Houlton, Maine. Both farms, whose complexes stand roughly opposite each other on Ludlow Road northwest of the town center, were established in the mid-19th century, and substantially modernized in the early 20th century. As examples of the changing agricultural trends of Aroostook County, they were listed on the National Register of Historic Places in 2009.

== Donovan Farm ==
The Donovan Farm stands on the south side of Ludlow Road. The farmstead is a connected complex with an east-facing main house joined to a three-story gambrel-roofed barn by a long single-story ell extending to the south. The barn's main entrance faces north, with a secondary entrance to the basement on the east. The house built c. 1845 by Michael Donovan, an Irish immigrant, whose landholdings exceeded 200 acres (81 ha), including the Hussey Farm property. Donovan worked the farm as a dairy operation, an industry which began to decline in the area in the 1920s. The original Donovan barn was destroyed by fire in 1920, as was its replacement just eighteen months later. Donovan's son built a new barn oriented toward potato farming, and also updated the house from its original Cape configuration into a Dutch Colonial. The farm originally had several other outbuildings, including a potato house and a hog or chicken house, but these have been torn down.

== Hussey Farm ==
The Hussey Farm stands on the north side of Ludlow Road, with a connected farmstead including the main house, barn, and milk house. Other outbuildings on the property include an equipment shed near the house, and a wood frame structure used as a recreational camp at the edge of woods to the north. The original Donovan farm property was divided in 1893 by his sons Timothy and John, with the latter taking ownership of the northern section. John Donovan lived in a house that was located west of the present farmstead. In 1912 he sold the property to Joseph Hussey, who grew up nearby, and it was Hussey who built the present American Foursquare house around that time. The barn, like that on the Donovan farm a three-story gambrel-roofed structure, appears to have been built earlier; the date "1906" is incised on one of its beams. Unlike the Donovan barn, this one is organized for dairy operations.

== See also ==
- National Register of Historic Places listings in Aroostook County, Maine
