= Hyrum and Selma Erickson Jacobson House =

- U.S. National Register of Historic Places
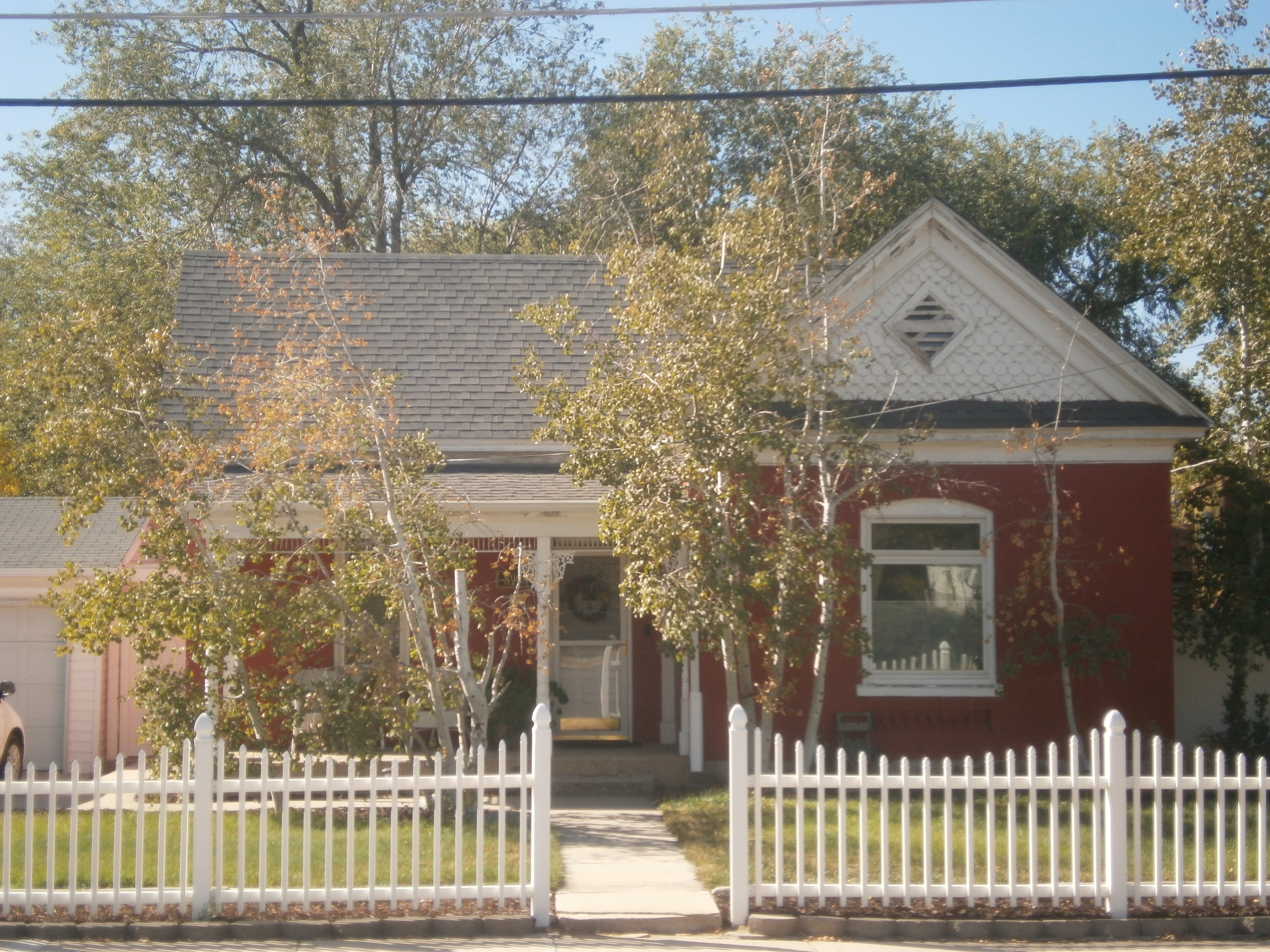

- Location within Utah Location within the United States
- Location: 8908 South 220 East, Sandy, Utah
- Coordinates: 40°35′24″N 111°53′00″W
- Area: 0.2 acres (0.081 ha)
- Built: 1914
- Architectural style: Late Victorian
- MPS: Sandy City MPS
- NRHP reference No.: 99001550
- Added to NRHP: December 9, 1999

The Hyrum and Selma Erickson Jacobson House, at 8908 South 220 East in Sandy, Utah, was built in 1914. It was listed on the National Register of Historic Places in 1999.

It is a one-story brick cross-wing house, built upon a foundation of ashlar granite blocks. Its original red brick exterior was painted red, and later the mortar joints between were painted white. It has Victorian Eclectic details.
