= Big Black Site =

- U.S. National Register of Historic Places
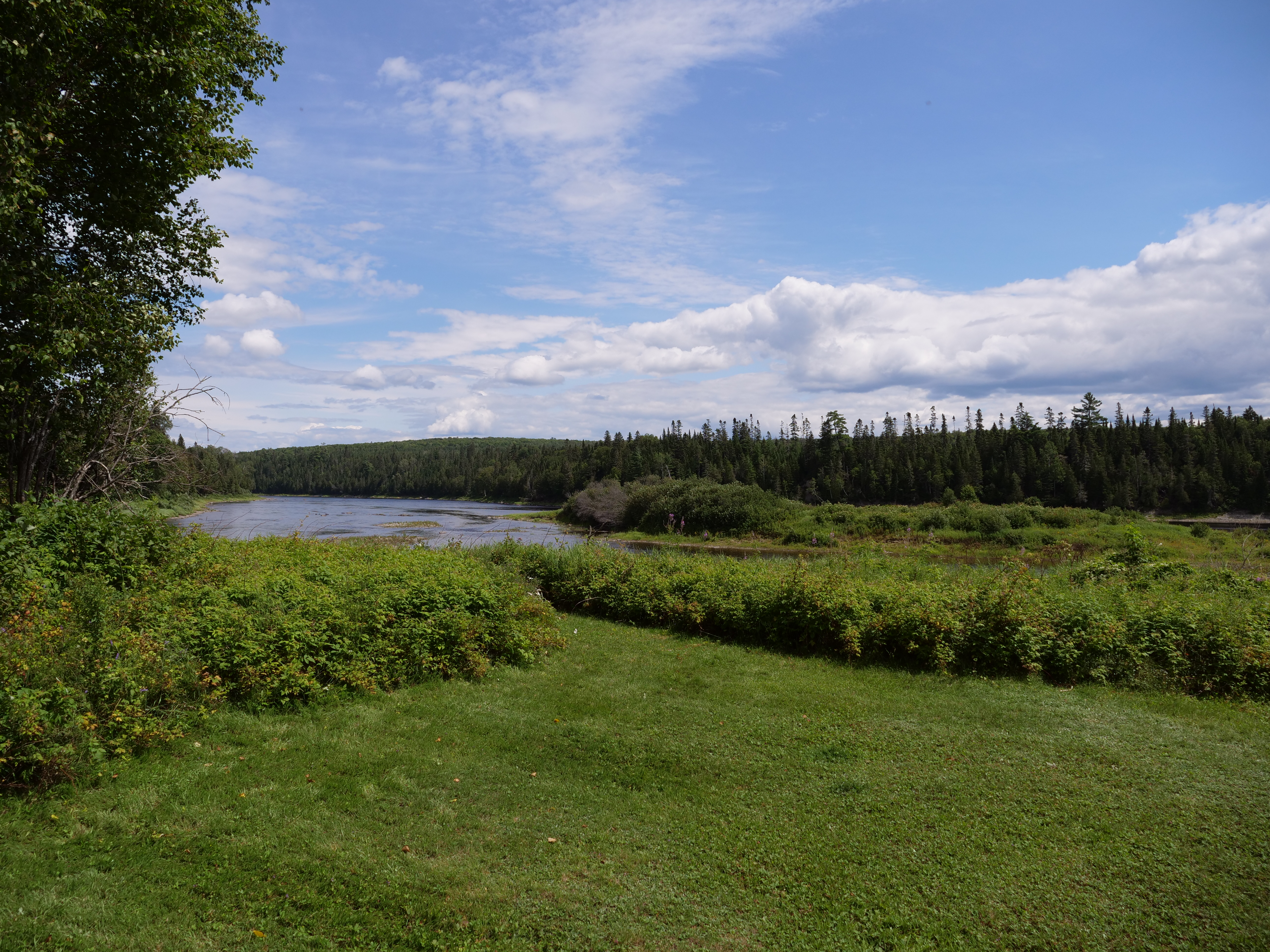

- Location within Maine Location within the United States
- Nearest city: Eagle Lake, Maine
- Coordinates: 46°56′57.1″N 69°26′58.3″W
- Area: 1 acre (0.40 ha)
- NRHP reference No.: 75000090
- Added to NRHP: September 9, 1975

The Big Black Site is an archaeological site in remote northwestern Aroostook County, Maine. The 1-acre (0.40 ha) site, located near the mouth of the Big Black River exhibits evidence of occupation and use over a period of several thousand years, ending in historic times. The site is significant as a well-preserved site (although slightly damaged by the presence of a 20th-century sporting camp over part of it) on an undammed river, and was, at the time of its listing on the National Register of Historic Places in 1975, expected to yield significant information about the area's prehistory.

== Description and history ==
The site is located in the general vicinity of the mouth of the Big Black River, in a remote and hard-to-access portion of western Aroostook County. This area was identified by archaeologists as potentially of interest, because the rivers in the area had not been dammed to harness their power, which had the added consequence of destroying archaeological sites located on river banks. The area's first major survey was performed in the 1920s by Warren K. Moorehead, who mentions finding habitation sites on the Big Black. Partly due to its remoteness, the area was for many years only subject to occasional spot surveys. In 1973 the area was surveyed by a team from the University of Maine at Orono, in which this site was identified.

The site is about 1 acre (0.40 ha) in size, and was at the time of the 1973 survey partially overlaid by a sporting camp, which had disturbed some of the upper levels of the site. Outside these areas, the site is well preserved, and shows signs of deep stratification, with layering suggesting dating from the Archaic Period (c. 4000 BCE) to historic times.

== See also ==
- National Register of Historic Places listings in Aroostook County, Maine
