= Musée Culturel du Mont-Carmel =

Historic church in Maine, United States

- Our Lady of Mount Carmel Catholic Church
- U.S. National Register of Historic Places
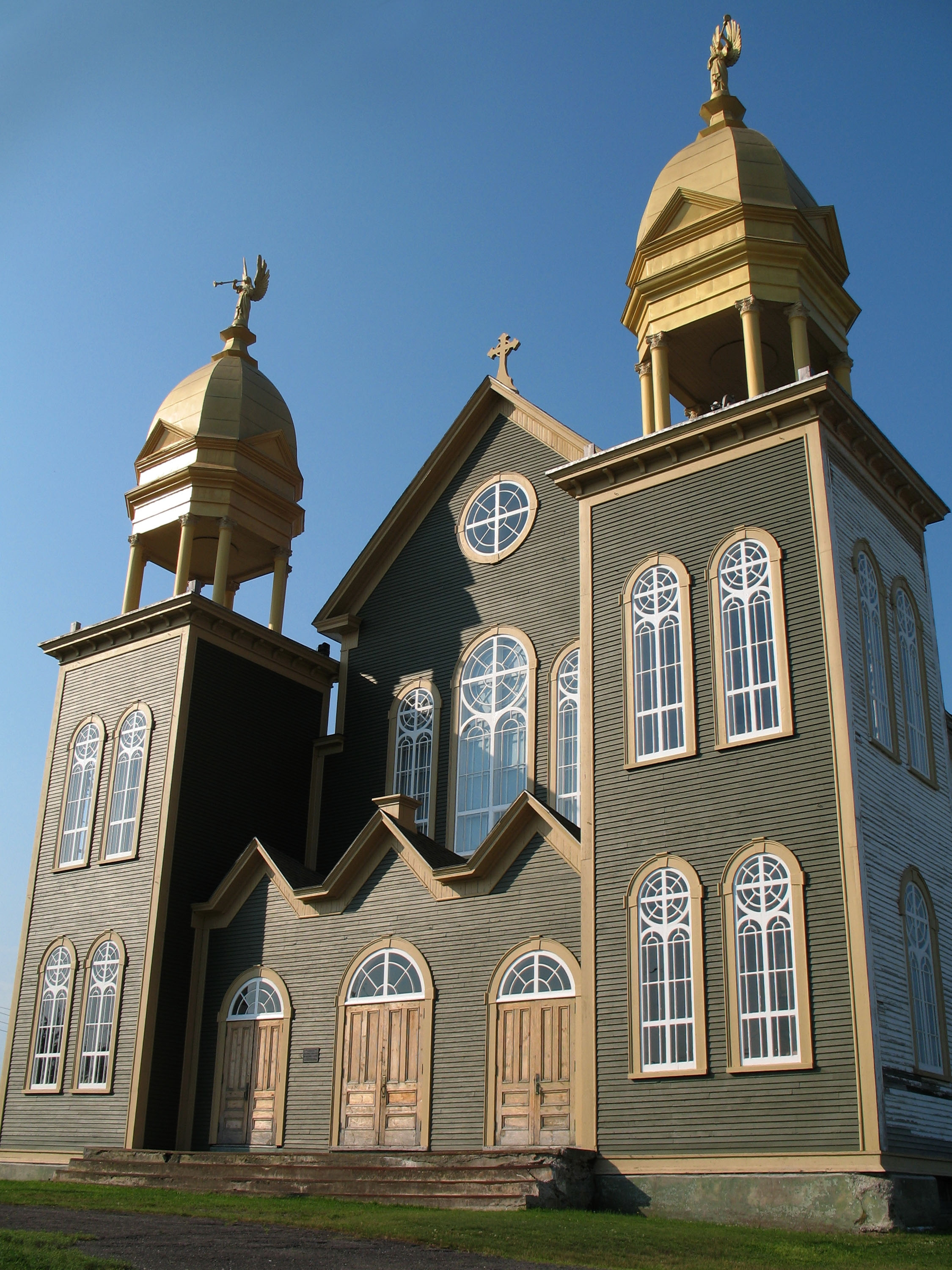
- The church exterior as restored in 2008

- Location within Maine Location within the United States
- Location: U.S. 1, Grand Isle, Maine
- Coordinates: 47°16′45″N 68°6′29″W
- Area: 5 acres (2.0 ha)
- Built: 1893
- NRHP reference No.: 73000100
- Added to NRHP: October 15, 1973

The Musée Culturel du Mont-Carmel (Cultural Museum of Mont-Carmel) is a museum of local history on United States Route 1 in Grand Isle, Maine. It is located in the former Our Lady of Mount Carmel Catholic Church, one of the only surviving 19th-century Acadian churches in northern Maine. The architecturally distinctive building was listed on the National Register of Historic Places in 1973.

== Architecture and building history ==
The museum is located on the south side of United States Route 1 in the rural village center of Lille. A former church, it is a large wood-frame structure with a basically rectangular footprint, extended to the rear by additions. The main section of the building has a steeply pitched gable roof with a clerestory top. The building's most interesting features are found on the complex facade, which projects from the main section, and is divided into three sections. The outer sections are identical square towers, which rise two full stories to an open belfry supported by an arcade of eight Corinthian columns, which support a Baroque dome. The central section has three double-door entries, each surmounted with a half-round window, and topped by a gable at the first floor level. Most of the building's windows are narrow with round-arch topps, and consist of paired round-arch sections with a circular motif at the top.

The upper Saint John River valley was settled by Acadians in the final quarter of the 18th century, before the border between Maine and New Brunswick was fixed. When the border was set by the 1842 Webster-Ashburton Treaty, the river became the border in this region, dividing the community. Acadians on the south side petitioned the Roman Catholic Diocese of Fredericton for their own church, which was built in 1848. In 1870 the parish was transferred to the Diocese of Portland. It was built between 1908 and 1909 by Léonide Gagné, and its ancient Roman basilica interior was designed by the architect Théophile Daoust of Montréal. It opened to the public on New Year's Day in 1910, celebrating its first Mass.

Due to high maintenance costs, the church was closed in 1978. Legal action following the closure prevented either its maintenance or rehabilitation until 1983. The following year a non-profit was established, which acquired the building from the diocese, and has since carefully restored it.

== Museum ==
The former church now houses a collection of artifacts related to the Acadian history of the area, and is the site of cultural events. It is open to the public between June 15 and Labor Day.

== See also ==
- National Register of Historic Places listings in Aroostook County, Maine
