= Pehr J. Jacobson House =

Historic house in Maine, United States

- U.S. National Register of Historic Places
- Location within Maine Location within the United States
- Location: 452 New Sweden Rd., New Sweden, Maine
- Coordinates: 46°57′14″N 68°8′31″W
- Area: 3 acres (1.2 ha)
- Built: 1870
- Architectural style: Maine Swedish log house
- NRHP reference No.: 07000013
- Added to NRHP: February 7, 2007

The Pehr J. Jacobson House is a historic log house at 452 New Sweden Road (Maine State Route 161) in New Sweden, Maine. It was built c. 1870 by one of the first Swedish immigrants drawn to the area as part of a state program. It is one of a small number of surviving log houses in the state built by Swedish immigrants, and reflects their distinctive construction style. The house was listed on the National Register of Historic Places in 2007.

== Description and history ==
The Jacobson House is set on the west side of New Sweden Road, near the top of what is now called Jacobson Hill. The 3-acre (1.2 ha) property includes, in addition to the house, a 1936 gambrel-roofed barn (located southwest of the house), and an heirloom orchard that includes twelve apple trees planted by Pehr Jacobson. From its exterior appearance the house is a 1 1/2-story Cape style structure, with a side gable roof and a central gable-roof dormer that breaks the eave to join the main (east-facing) facade. The facade is three bays wide, with sash windows in the end bays and the dormer, and a replacement bay window in the center bay. A frame addition extends to the rear from the southwest corner of the main block. The house has a metal roof and Masonite siding.

The exterior walls of the main block are fashioned out of 6-inch (15 cm) cedar logs that have been squared on the interior and exterior faces. Two interior log walls, running east–west, divide the block into three roughly equal-sized sections. Frame walls further subdivide two of these spaces, and doorways are cut into the log walls to provide circulation. The interior log walls are partially exposed, as is a portion of the exterior wall near the rear addition, so that aspects of its construction methods are exposed. The visible joints are formed from square notches, and there is evidence of moss chinking.

The main block of the house was built c. 1870 by Pehr J. Jacobson, who was one of the first Swedish immigrants to settle New Sweden in 1870, under a program by the state government to encourage immigration to the area which gave each family 100 acres (40 ha). Jacobson was granted one of the first 36 tracts granted in what was later incorporated as New Sweden. The house is of comparatively large size for a childless couple of the period, although there is evidence that he may have temporarily house a C. Jacobson who eventually settled nearby.

== See also ==
- National Register of Historic Places listings in Aroostook County, Maine
