= Gray Memorial United Methodist Church and Parsonage =

Historic church in Maine, United States

- U.S. National Register of Historic Places
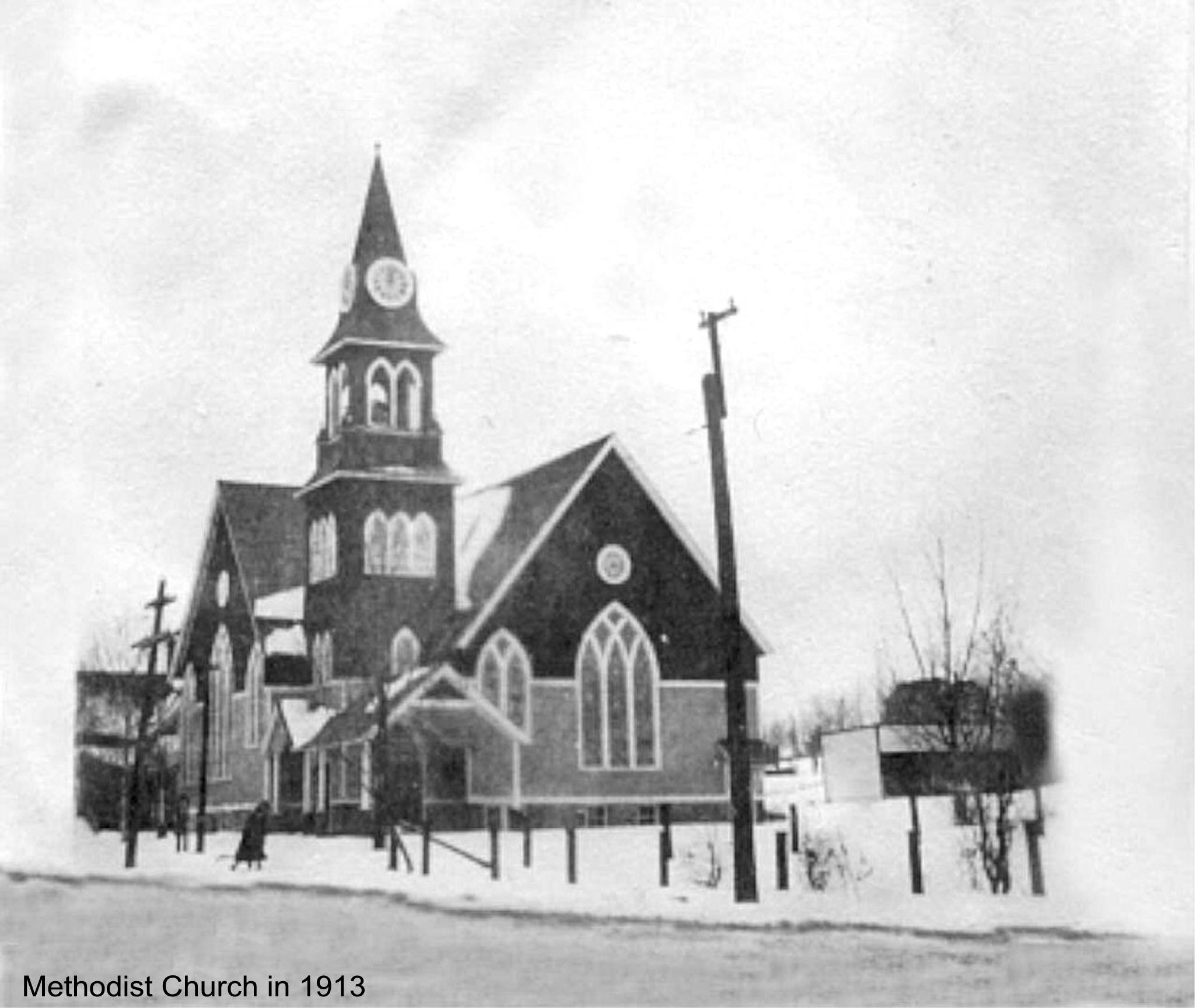
- The church in 1913

- Location within Maine Location within the United States
- Location: 8 + 10 Prospect St., Caribou, Maine
- Coordinates: 46°51′37″N 68°1′2″W
- Area: less than one acre
- Built: 1912 (church), 1906 (parsonage)
- Architect: Astle & Page
- Architectural style: Gothic Revival (church), Colonial Revival (parsonage)
- NRHP reference No.: 95000725
- Added to NRHP: June 20, 1995

The Gray Memorial United Methodist Church and Parsonage is a historic church complex at 8 Prospect Street in Caribou, Maine. The Gothic Revival wood-frame church, built in 1912-14 for a Methodist congregation founded in 1860, is the most architecturally sophisticated church in Caribou. It was built on the lot of the Colonial Revival parsonage house, which was moved to make way for the church. The complex was listed on the National Register of Historic Places in 1995. The current pastor is Pastor Richard Rego.

== Description and history ==
The Gray Memorial United Methodist Church is set on a grassy level lot at the corner of Prospect and Sweden Streets in downtown Caribou. The building is an L-shaped wood-frame structure, with a multistage tower at the crook of the L. The facade facing Sweden Street has a large central gable with three lancet-arched windows, the central one larger than those flanking it, and an oriel window above. The main entrance is in the tower, which is slightly recessed from the facade and sheltered by a gable-roof hood. A secondary entrance is located to the left of the gable, and there is a porte-cochere to the right, supported by square posts set on stone piers. The Prospect street facade also has a primary entrance in the tower, with two secondary entrances on the large gable to the right. The gable has one large centered lancet-arch window with an oriel window above, and a smaller lancet-arch window to the left. The tower's second and third levels both have short lancet-arch windows, one on the second level and three on the third. Above the third level is a flared roofline, above which is an open belfry with paired lancet-arch openings, and a pyramidal roof above with an embedded clock.

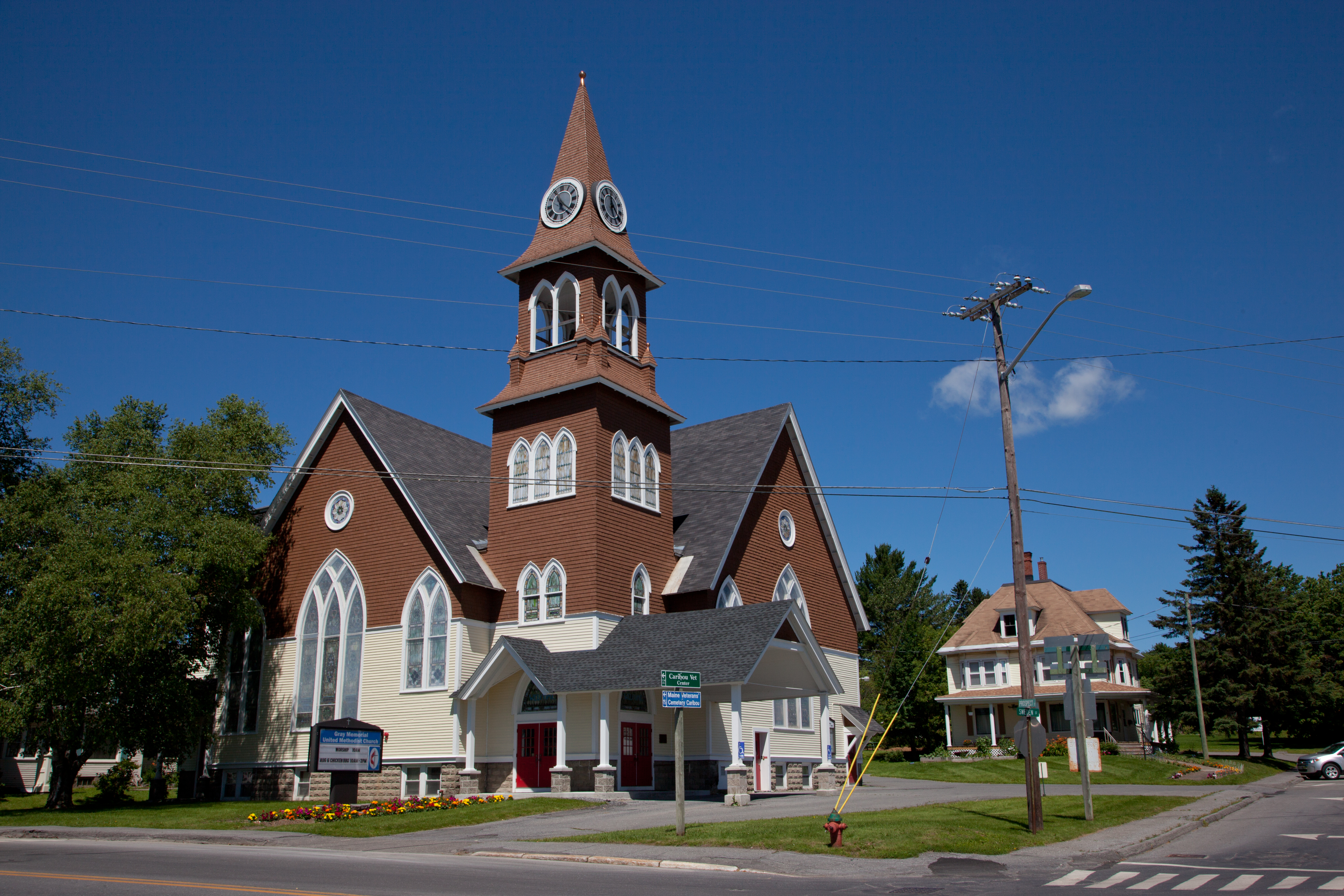
The church in 2018

The church interior has retained its original configuration and use since construction. It is based on a "combination plan", uniting the ideas behind the "auditorium plan" and "Akron Plan" that were popularized after the American Civil War. The interiors have decorative metal walls and ceilings, and cypress flooring. The stained glass windows were manufactured by Spence, Bell and Company of Boston, Massachusetts, and the tower clock is by Seth Thomas. The parsonage house, constructed in 1906, is a Colonial Revival structure with a hip roof with dormers, and a wraparound porch.

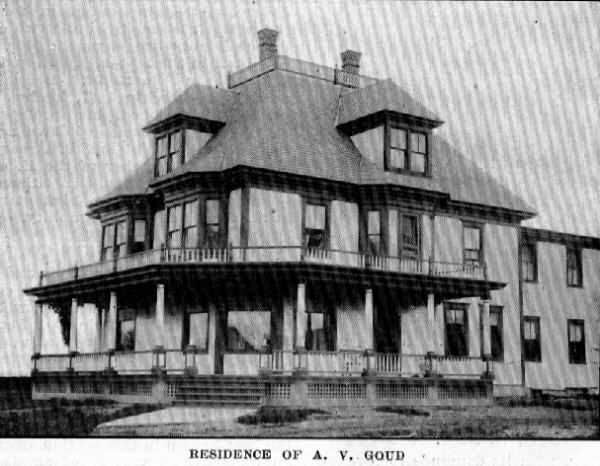
The current parsonage c. 1906-1911

The Methodist congregation in Caribou was established in 1860 with circuit ministers, and built its first sanctuary on an adjacent property in 1885. Having outgrown that space, it purchased the house next door, moved it back for use as the parsonage, and built the present sanctuary in 1912–14. The church was named in honor of Bessie Gray, the pastor's wife who was instrumental in the process of building the new facility. The church was built (and apparently also designed by) the local firm of Astle and Page.

== See also ==
- National Register of Historic Places listings in Aroostook County, Maine
