= Acadian Village (Van Buren, Maine) =

- Acadian Historic Buildings
- U.S. National Register of Historic Places
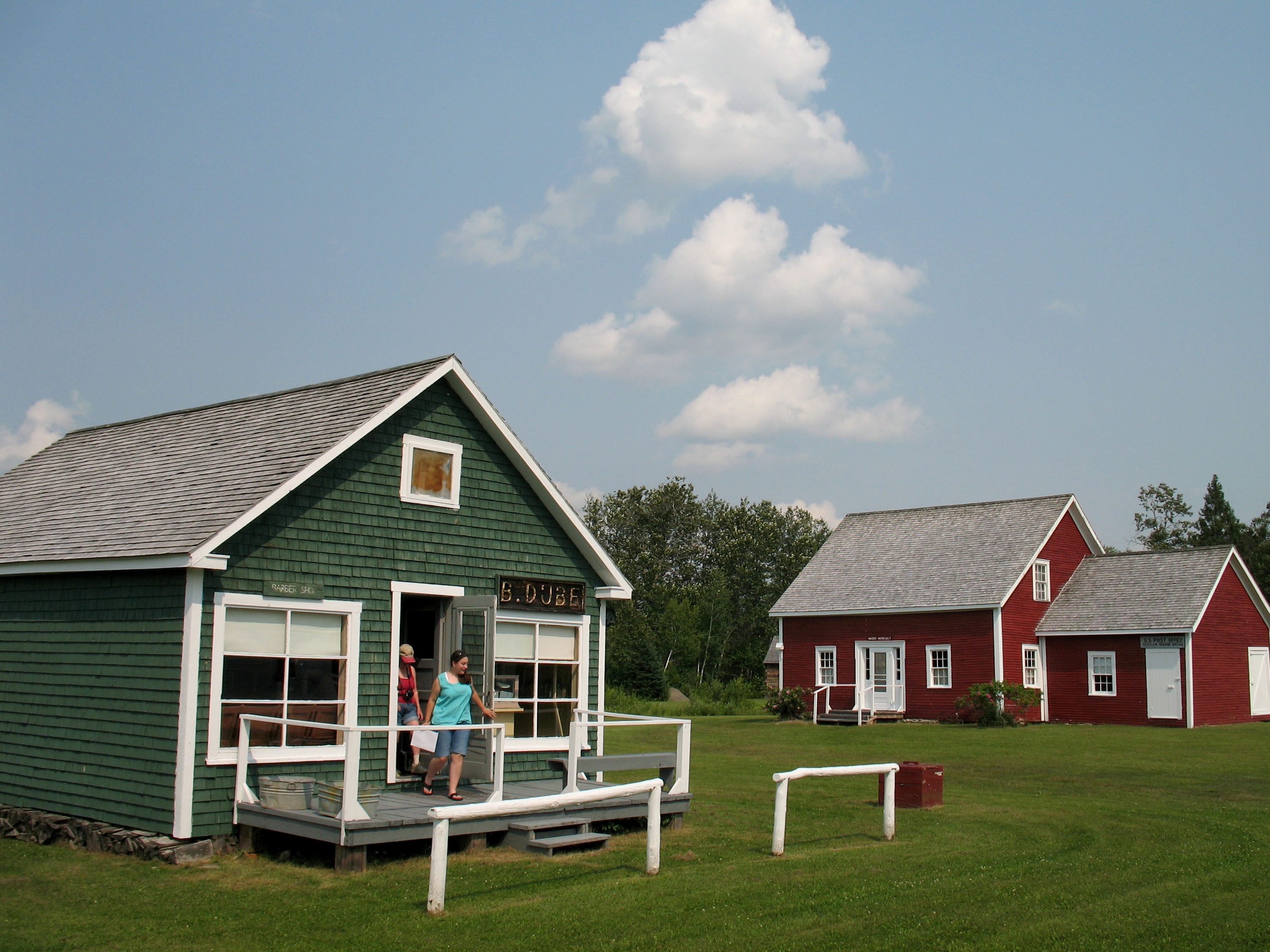
- Museum shop (left) and Morneault House (right)

- Location within Maine Location within the United States
- Nearest city: Van Buren, Maine
- Coordinates: 47°12′17″N 67°59′26″W
- Area: 3 acres (1.2 ha)
- NRHP reference No.: 77000062
- Added to NRHP: December 13, 1977

The Acadian Village is a museum of Acadian heritage on United States Route 1 in Van Buren, Maine. The museum includes a complex of six historic buildings (five authentic 19th-century structures, one a careful modern reproduction) in which the life and work of 19th-century Acadians is showcased; this complex has been listed on the National Register of Historic Places. The museum is open daily between June and September.

== Buildings ==
In addition to a split-log visitor center built in 1976, the museum includes five wood-frame structures built in the mid-19th century: three houses, a schoolhouse, and a blacksmith's shop. The church, a rough log structure also built in 1976, is a reproduction of a typical 18th-century Acadian church. All of the buildings are either one or 1 1/2 stories in height, with gabled roofs. They are built using either log construction or wood framing. The Morneault House, for example, is a log structure with the logs exposed inside, and is finished on the outside with clapboards. It served as an early post office in the region. The Village Schoolhouse is a wood-frame structure, built in 1875, and is also finished with clapboards. It was originally located in Hamlin, and is believed to be the oldest schoolhouse in the region.

These buildings were not originally located at this site, having been moved from elsewhere in the region by the museum's organizing body, L'Heritage Vivant. They represent surviving elements of early French-American Acadian culture, which originally settled the area in the 1780s, and remained through a border dispute between Maine and New Brunswick in the first half of the 19th century. When the border dispute was resolved without bloodshed with the 1842 Webster-Ashburton Treaty, the Acadian community was divided between the two jurisdictions.

== See also ==
- National Register of Historic Places listings in Aroostook County, Maine
