= Wallagrass, Maine =

Town in Maine, United States

- Town
- Location of Wallagrass, Maine
- Coordinates: 47°08′56″N 68°37′50″W
- Country: United States
- State: Maine
- County: Aroostook
- Villages: Wallagrass; Soldier Pond

Area
  - Total: 40.80 sq mi (105.67 km^{2})
  - Land: 40.10 sq mi (103.86 km^{2})
  - Water: 0.70 sq mi (1.81 km^{2})
- Elevation: 843 ft (257 m)

Population (2020)
  - Total: 519
  - Density: 13/sq mi (5/km^{2})
- Time zone: UTC-5 (Eastern (EST))
  - Summer (DST): UTC-4 (EDT)
- ZIP code: 04781
- Area code: 207
- FIPS code: 23-79865
- GNIS feature ID: 582788

Wallagrass is a town in Aroostook County, Maine, United States. The population was 519 at the 2020 census.

== Geography ==
According to the United States Census Bureau, the town has a total area of 40.80 square miles (105.67 km^{2}), of which 40.10 square miles (103.86 km^{2}) is land and 0.70 square miles (1.81 km^{2}) is water.

== Demographics ==
Historical population
Census	Pop.	Note	%±
1870	297		—
1880	431		45.1%
1890	595		38.1%
1900	784		31.8%
1910	1,004		28.1%
1920	1,144		13.9%
1930	1,145		0.1%
1940	1,123		−1.9%
1950	1,035		−7.8%
1960	818		−21.0%
1970	617		−24.6%
1980	653		5.8%
1990	582		−10.9%
2000	561		−3.6%
2010	546		−2.7%
2020	519		−4.9%
U.S. Decennial Census

=== 2010 census ===
As of the census of 2010, there were 546 people, 244 households, and 162 families living in the town. The population density was 13.6 inhabitants per square mile (5.3/km^{2}). There were 309 housing units at an average density of 7.7 per square mile (3.0/km^{2}). The racial makeup of the town was 97.6% White, 0.9% African American, 0.4% Native American, and 1.1% from two or more races. Hispanic or Latino of any race were 0.5% of the population.

There were 244 households, of which 21.7% had children under the age of 18 living with them, 58.6% were married couples living together, 4.1% had a female householder with no husband present, 3.7% had a male householder with no wife present, and 33.6% were non-families. 25.4% of all households were made up of individuals, and 10.7% had someone living alone who was 65 years of age or older. The average household size was 2.24 and the average family size was 2.69.

The median age in the town was 47.3 years. 17.8% of residents were under the age of 18; 6.3% were between the ages of 18 and 24; 22.7% were from 25 to 44; 33.9% were from 45 to 64; and 19.2% were 65 years of age or older. The gender makeup of the town was 51.8% male and 48.2% female.

=== 2000 census ===
Languages (2000)	Percent
Spoke French at home	64.41%
Spoke English at home	35.59%

As of the census of 2000, there were 561 people, 217 households, and 159 families living in the town. The population density was 14.1 people per square mile (5.4/km^{2}). There were 308 housing units at an average density of 7.7 per square mile (3.0/km^{2}). The racial makeup of the town was 99.29% White, 0.53% from other races, and 0.18% from two or more races. Hispanic or Latino of any race were 0.53% of the population.

There were 217 households, out of which 34.6% had children under the age of 18 living with them, 65.9% were married couples living together, 3.2% had a female householder with no husband present, and 26.7% were non-families. 22.6% of all households were made up of individuals, and 8.8% had someone living alone who was 65 years of age or older. The average household size was 2.59 and the average family size was 3.06.

In the town, the population was spread out, with 26.6% under the age of 18, 6.4% from 18 to 24, 29.9% from 25 to 44, 23.2% from 45 to 64, and 13.9% who were 65 years of age or older. The median age was 38 years. For every 100 females, there were 101.1 males. For every 100 females age 18 and over, there were 98.1 males.

The median income for a household in the town was $29,464, and the median income for a family was $35,000. Males had a median income of $28,125 versus $20,625 for females. The per capita income for the town was $13,802. About 9.5% of families and 11.5% of the population were below the poverty line, including 8.5% of those under age 18 and 23.7% of those age 65 or over.
