= Westfield, Maine =

Town in Maine, United States

- Town
- Location of Westfield, Maine
- Coordinates: 46°33′05″N 68°00′12″W
- Country: United States
- State: Maine
- County: Aroostook

Area
  - Total: 40.29 sq mi (104.35 km^{2})
  - Land: 40.25 sq mi (104.25 km^{2})
  - Water: 0.039 sq mi (0.10 km^{2})
- Elevation: 646 ft (197 m)

Population (2020)
  - Total: 455
  - Density: 11/sq mi (4.4/km^{2})
- Time zone: UTC-5 (Eastern (EST))
  - Summer (DST): UTC-4 (EDT)
- ZIP code: 04787
- Area code: 207
- FIPS code: 23-82770
- GNIS feature ID: 582804

Westfield is a town in Aroostook County, Maine, United States. The population was 455 at the 2020 census.

== Geography ==
According to the United States Census Bureau, the town has a total area of 40.29 square miles (104.35 km^{2}), of which 40.25 square miles (104.25 km^{2}) is land and 0.04 square miles (0.10 km^{2}) is water.

== Demographics ==
Historical population
Census	Pop.	Note	%±
1870	76		—
1880	103		35.5%
1890	166		61.2%
1900	259		56.0%
1910	689		166.0%
1920	798		15.8%
1930	776		−2.8%
1940	735		−5.3%
1950	557		−24.2%
1960	569		2.2%
1970	517		−9.1%
1980	647		25.1%
1990	589		−9.0%
2000	559		−5.1%
2010	549		−1.8%
2020	455		−17.1%
U.S. Decennial Census

=== 2010 census ===
At the 2010 census there were 549 people, 216 households, and 159 families living in the town. The population density was 13.6 inhabitants per square mile (5.3/km^{2}). There were 240 housing units at an average density of 6.0 per square mile (2.3/km^{2}). The racial makeup of the town was 98.9% White, 0.4% African American, and 0.7% Native American. Of the 216 households 24.1% had children under the age of 18 living with them, 59.3% were married couples living together, 7.9% had a female householder with no husband present, 6.5% had a male householder with no wife present, and 26.4% were non-families. 21.8% of households were one person and 7.8% were one person aged 65 or older. The average household size was 2.40 and the average family size was 2.72.

The median age in the town was 48.3 years. 18.9% of residents were under the age of 18; 5.9% were between the ages of 18 and 24; 20.9% were from 25 to 44; 35% were from 45 to 64; and 19.1% were 65 or older. The gender makeup of the town was 50.8% male and 49.2% female.

=== 2000 census ===
At the 2000 census there were 559 people, 218 households, and 156 families living in the town. The population density was 13.9 people per square mile (5.4/km^{2}). There were 237 housing units at an average density of 5.9 per square mile (2.3/km^{2}). The racial makeup of the town was 97.67% White, 0.36% African American, 0.18% Native American, and 1.79% from two or more races. Of the 218 households 27.5% had children under the age of 18 living with them, 59.6% were married couples living together, 7.3% had a female householder with no husband present, and 28.0% were non-families. 22.0% of households were one person and 11.5% were one person aged 65 or older. The average household size was 2.43 and the average family size was 2.83.

The age distribution was 20.4% under the age of 18, 5.4% from 18 to 24, 26.1% from 25 to 44, 32.0% from 45 to 64, and 16.1% 65 or older. The median age was 44 years. For every 100 females, there were 97.5 males. For every 100 females age 18 and over, there were 98.7 males.

The median household income was $27,083 and the median family income was $33,409. Males had a median income of $25,556 versus $17,250 for females. The per capita income for the town was $13,533. About 8.8% of families and 15.0% of the population were below the poverty line, including 21.9% of those under age 18 and 28.4% of those age 65 or over.
