= St. John Plantation, Maine =

St. John Plantation Plantation de Saint-Jean
- Plantation
- Location of Saint John Plantation, Maine
- Coordinates: 47°09′25″N 68°45′30″W
- Country: United States
- State: Maine
- County: Aroostook

Area
  - Total: 51.5 sq mi (133.5 km^{2})
  - Land: 50.3 sq mi (130.2 km^{2})
  - Water: 1.3 sq mi (3.3 km^{2})
- Elevation: 1,188 ft (362 m)

Population (2020)
  - Total: 263
  - Density: 5.23/sq mi (2.02/km^{2})
- Time zone: UTC-5 (Eastern (EST))
  - Summer (DST): UTC-4 (EDT)
- ZIP code: 04743
- Area code: 207
- FIPS code: 23-65200
- GNIS feature ID: 582710

St. John Plantation or Saint John Plantation (French: Plantation de Saint-Jean) is a plantation in Aroostook County, Maine, United States, on the banks of the Saint John River. The population was 263 at the 2020 census.

== Geography ==
According to the United States Census Bureau, the plantation has a total area of 51.5 square miles (133.5 km^{2}), of which 50.3 square miles (130.2 km^{2}) is land and 1.3 square miles (3.3 km^{2}), or 2.45%, is water.

== Demographics ==
Historical population
Census	Pop.	Note	%±
1870	127		—
1880	166		30.7%
1890	226		36.1%
1900	371		64.2%
1910	571		53.9%
1920	549		−3.9%
1930	569		3.6%
1940	628		10.4%
1950	569		−9.4%
1960	407		−28.5%
1970	377		−7.4%
1980	322		−14.6%
1990	274		−14.9%
2000	282		2.9%
2010	267		−5.3%
2020	263		−1.5%
U.S. Decennial Census

At the 2000 census there were 282 people in 110 households, including 78 families, in the plantation. The population density was 5.6 inhabitants per square mile (2.2/km^{2}). There were 147 housing units at an average density of 2.9 per square mile (1.1/km^{2}). The racial makeup of the plantation was 100.00% White. Of the 110 households 33.6% had children under the age of 18 living with them, 62.7% were married couples living together, 6.4% had a female householder with no husband present, and 28.2% were non-families. 24.5% of households were one person and 16.4% were one person aged 65 or older. The average household size was 2.56 and the average family size was 3.04.

The age distribution was 27.7% under the age of 18, 5.3% from 18 to 24, 24.5% from 25 to 44, 27.7% from 45 to 64, and 14.9% 65 or older. The median age was 40 years. For every 100 females, there were 91.8 males. For every 100 females age 18 and over, there were 96.2 males.

The median household income was $27,250 and the median family income was $37,500. Males had a median income of $29,375 versus $13,750 for females. The per capita income for the plantation was $13,212. About 6.6% of families and 8.1% of the population were below the poverty line, including 3.2% of those under the age of 18 and 20.9% of those 65 or over.
