= Stockholm, Maine =

Town in Maine, United States

- Town
- Location of Stockholm, Maine
- Coordinates: 47°03′59″N 68°08′12″W
- Country: United States
- State: Maine
- County: Aroostook
- Villages: Stockholm; California

Area
  - Total: 34.27 sq mi (88.76 km^{2})
  - Land: 34.20 sq mi (88.58 km^{2})
  - Water: 0.069 sq mi (0.18 km^{2})
- Elevation: 728 ft (222 m)

Population (2020)
  - Total: 250
  - Density: 7.3/sq mi (2.8/km^{2})
- Time zone: UTC-5 (Eastern (EST))
  - Summer (DST): UTC-4 (EDT)
- ZIP Codes: 04783 (Stockholm); 04785 (Van Buren)
- Area code: 207
- FIPS code: 23-74405
- GNIS feature ID: 582748

Stockholm is a town in Aroostook County, Maine, United States. The population was 250 at the 2020 census.

== Geography ==
According to the United States Census Bureau, the town has a total area of 34.27 square miles (88.76 km^{2}), of which 34.20 square miles (88.58 km^{2}) is land and 0.07 square miles (0.18 km^{2}) is water.

== Demographics ==
Historical population
Census	Pop.	Note	%±
1900	191		—
1910	715		274.3%
1920	1,038		45.2%
1930	1,101		6.1%
1940	891		−19.1%
1950	641		−28.1%
1960	649		1.2%
1970	388		−40.2%
1980	319		−17.8%
1990	286		−10.3%
2000	271		−5.2%
2010	253		−6.6%
2020	250		−1.2%
U.S. Decennial Census

=== 2010 census ===
As of the census of 2010, there were 253 people, 110 households, and 75 families living in the town. The population density was 7.4 inhabitants per square mile (2.9/km^{2}). There were 149 housing units at an average density of 4.4 per square mile (1.7/km^{2}). The racial makeup of the town was 98.4% White, 0.4% Asian, and 1.2% from two or more races.

There were 110 households, of which 22.7% had children under the age of 18 living with them, 53.6% were married couples living together, 6.4% had a female householder with no husband present, 8.2% had a male householder with no wife present, and 31.8% were non-families. 29.1% of all households were made up of individuals, and 13.6% had someone living alone who was 65 years of age or older. The average household size was 2.30 and the average family size was 2.75.

The median age in the town was 46.7 years. 16.2% of residents were under the age of 18; 8.3% were between the ages of 18 and 24; 21.7% were from 25 to 44; 33.6% were from 45 to 64; and 20.2% were 65 years of age or older. The gender makeup of the town was 48.6% male and 51.4% female.

=== 2000 census ===
As of the census of 2000, there were 271 people, 111 households, and 79 families living in the town. The population density was 7.8 people per square mile (3.0/km^{2}). There were 140 housing units at an average density of 4.0 per square mile (1.6/km^{2}). The racial makeup of the town was 99.26% White, 0.37% Native American, and 0.37% from two or more races.

There were 111 households, out of which 29.7% had children under the age of 18 living with them, 60.4% were married couples living together, 7.2% had a female householder with no husband present, and 28.8% were non-families. 26.1% of all households were made up of individuals, and 18.0% had someone living alone who was 65 years of age or older. The average household size was 2.44 and the average family size was 2.94.

In the town, the population was spread out, with 23.2% under the age of 18, 4.8% from 18 to 24, 24.0% from 25 to 44, 26.6% from 45 to 64, and 21.4% who were 65 years of age or older. The median age was 44 years. For every 100 females, there were 108.5 males. For every 100 females age 18 and over, there were 112.2 males.

The median income for a household in the town was $31,563, and the median income for a family was $36,750. Males had a median income of $25,357 versus $23,958 for females. The per capita income for the town was $15,246. About 8.4% of families and 8.5% of the population were below the poverty line, including 12.5% of those under the age of eighteen and 3.6% of those 65 or over.

== Other sources ==
- Lenentine, Charlotte The Swedish People of Northern Maine (University of Maine. 1950)
- Hede, Richard Maine's Swedish Colony 1870–1970 Centennial Book (1970)
