= South Branch Meduxnekeag River =

Location
- Country: United States

Physical characteristics
- Source
  - location: Maine
- Mouth
  - location: Meduxnekeag River
  - coordinates: 46°06′09″N 67°52′16″W
  - elevation: 345 feet (105 m)
- Length: 15.2 mi (24.5 km)

Basin features
- Progression: Meduxnekeag — St. John — Bay of Fundy

The South Branch Meduxnekeag River is a 15.2-mile-long (24.5 km) river in Aroostook County, Maine. From the outflow of Johnson Pond (46°02′07″N 67°55′16″W) in Linneus, the river runs about 5.8 miles (9.3 km) southeast to Cary, before running into the Lt. Gordon Manuel Wildlife Management Area in Hodgdon, then north about 9.4 miles (15.1 km) to its confluence with the Meduxnekeag River at Carys Mills, two miles upstream from Houlton.

== See also ==
- List of rivers of Maine
