= Maine's 34th State Senate district =

American legislative district

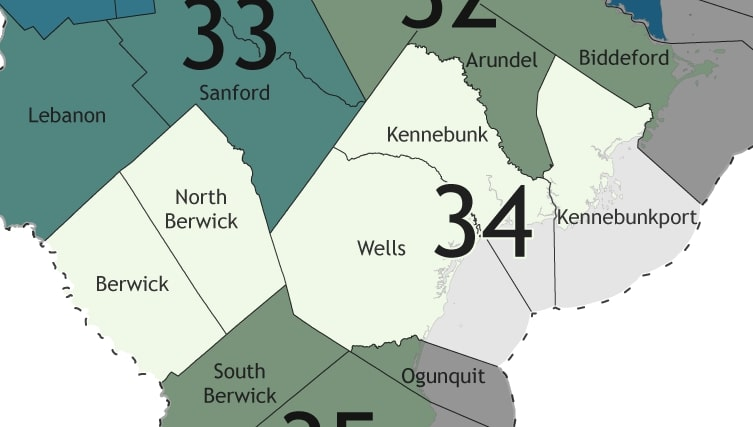
Senator
Joe Rafferty; D–Kennebunk
- Population (2020): 40,072

Maine's 34th State Senate district is one of 35 districts in the Maine Senate. It has been represented by Democrat Joe Rafferty since 2020

== Geography ==
District 34 represents part of the county of York, stretching to include part of the Gulf of Maine.

York County - 18.9% of county

Towns:

- Berwick
- Kennebunk
- Kennebunkport
- North Berwick
- Wells

== Recent election results ==
=== 2022 ===
2022 Maine State Senate election, District 34
Party	Candidate	Votes	%
Democratic	Joseph Rafferty	12,605	58.2
Republican	Bradley Ducharme	9,044	41.8
Total votes		21,649	100.0
Democratic hold			

Elections prior to 2022 were held under different district lines.

=== 2024 ===
2024 Maine State Senate election, District 34
Party	Candidate	Votes	%
Democratic	Joe Rafferty	15,064	55.8
Republican	Bradley Ducharme	11,941	44.2
Total votes		27,055	100.0
Democratic hold			

== Historical election results ==
=== 2012 ===
2012 Maine State Senate election, District 34
Party	Candidate	Votes	%
Republican	Roger Sherman	9,947	62
Democratic	Daniel Levesque	6,106	38
Total votes		16,053	100
Republican hold			

=== 2014 ===
2014 Maine State Senate election, District 34
Party	Candidate	Votes	%
Republican	Ronald Collins	8,523	46.4
Democratic	Gary Connor	6,600	35.9
Maine Families	Gary Connor	2,035	12.5
Blank votes	None	945	5.2
Total votes		18,382	100
Republican hold			

=== 2016 ===
2016 Maine State Senate election, District 34
Party	Candidate	Votes	%
Republican	Ronald Collins	13,164	55.4
Democratic	Jonathon Kilbourn	8,249	44.6
Total votes		10,584	100
Republican hold			

=== 2018 ===
2018 Maine State Senate election, District 34
Party	Candidate	Votes	%
Republican	Robert Foley	10,456	51.7
Democratic	Thomas Wright	9,776	48.3
Total votes		20,232	100
Republican hold			

=== 2020 ===
2020 Maine State Senate election, District 34
Party	Candidate	Votes	%
Democratic	Joseph Rafferty	13,494	51.9
Republican	Michael Pardue	9,612	48.1
Total votes		26,896	100.0
Democratic gain from Republican			
