= Kenneth Fredette =

American politician (born 1964)

Ken Fredette
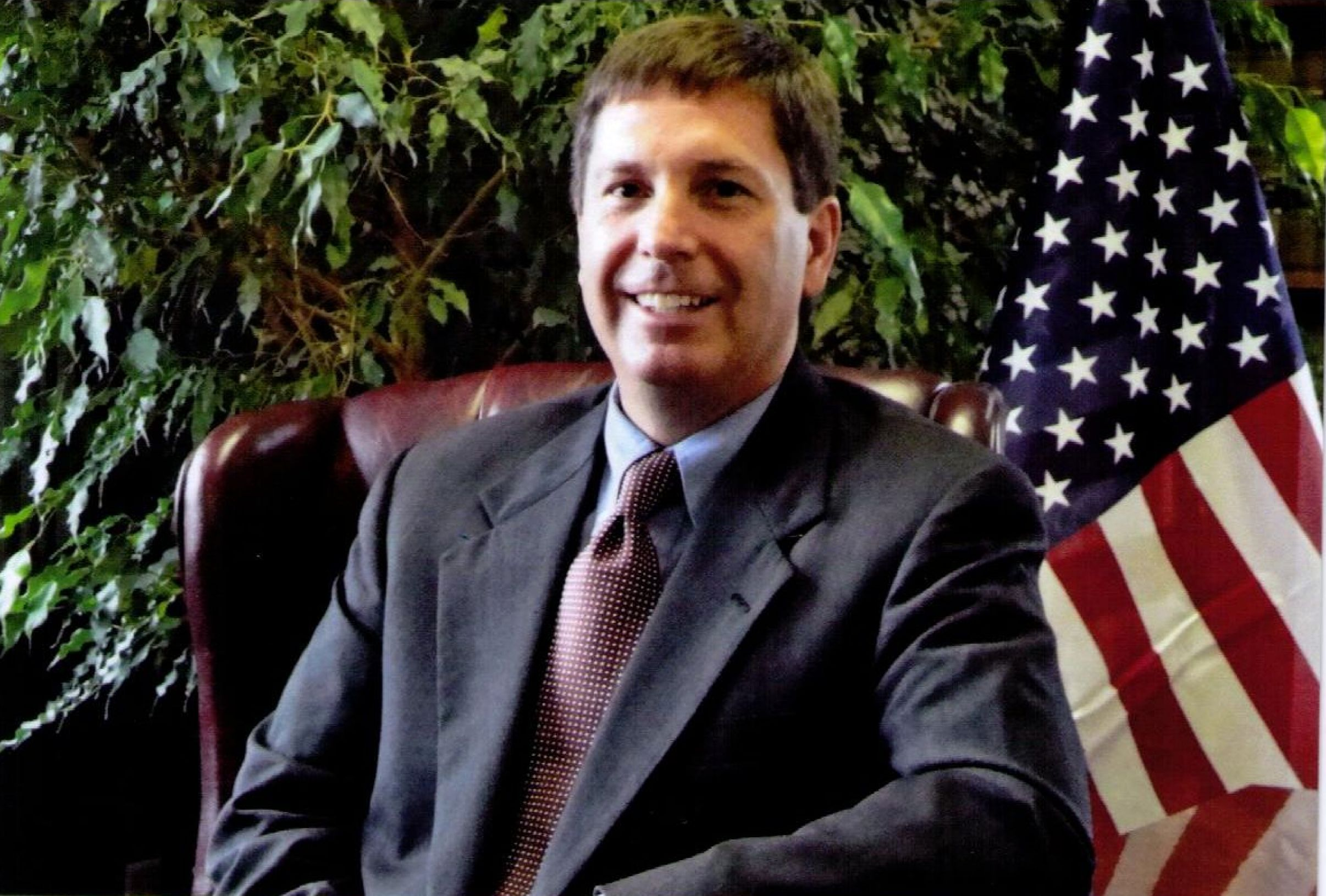

Minority Leader of the Maine House of Representatives
- In office December 7, 2012 – December 5, 2018
- Preceded by: Emily Cain
- Succeeded by: Kathleen Dillingham

Member of the Maine House of Representatives
- In office December 1, 2010 – December 5, 2018
- Preceded by: Joshua Tardy
- Succeeded by: Danny Costain
- Constituency: 25th district (2010–2014); 22nd district (2014–2016); 100th district (2016–2018)

Personal details
- Born: Kenneth Wade Fredette; March 3, 1964 (age 62) Houlton, Maine, U.S.
- Party: Republican
- Education: University of Maine, Machias (BS); University of Maine, Portland (JD); Harvard University (MPA)

Kenneth Wade Fredette (born March 3, 1964) is a former member of the Maine House of Representatives.

Fredette is a Republican. In 2012, he was elected Minority Leader of the Maine House. Fredette announced in June 2013 that he would not enter the 2014 race for the Republican nomination for Maine's Second Congressional District, citing family concerns.

Fredette announced his candidacy for governor of Maine on September 6, 2017. He was elected to the State House again in 2024.

== Early life and education ==
Fredette was born in rural Maine on March 3, 1964, as one of five children in his family. In 1982, he graduated from East Grand High School in Danforth, Maine as class valedictorian.

Fredette earned a B.S. in accounting from the University of Maine at Machias in 1987. He received a J.D. from the University of Maine School of Law in 1994 and a Master of Public Administration from Harvard University's Harvard Kennedy School in 2010.

== Non-partisan career ==
Fredette has been a Tribal Prosecutor for the Penobscot Indian Nation. He is currently a practicing attorney, and a lieutenant colonel in the Air National Guard, where he serves as a Judge Advocate General.

== Political career ==
=== Prior to 2010 ===
In 1985, Fredette was an intern for United States Senator Warren Rudman. In 1987 and 1988, he was on the campaign staff of presidential candidate Robert Dole, including being the New England Regional Youth Coordinator. In 1990, he was the field director of the campaign to re-elect Maine governor John McKernan Jr..

Fredette was unsuccessful in his legislative races prior to 2010: In District 125 of the Maine House of Representatives, in 1996 and 1998; in District 33 of the Maine State Senate, in 2004; and in District 28 of the Maine State Senate, in 2006.

=== 2010 to present ===
In his freshman term, 2011–2012, Fredette served on the Maine Legislature's budget-writing Appropriations and Financial Affairs Committee.

After being elected as House Republican Leader in November 2012, Fredette introduced bills requiring Temporary Assistance for Needy Families applicants to prove that they have applied for at least three jobs and eliminating the ability of DHHS caseworkers to use discretion in applying penalties to TANF recipients. He opposed the expansion of Medicaid in Maine. He also sponsored a bill that allocates funds for the use of electronic monitors on defendants in domestic violence cases.

Fredette commented in the Maine House on potential expansion of medicaid on June 12, 2013. He referenced the book Men Are from Mars, Women Are from Venus, contrasted a man's brain with women's, and questioned whether the proposed Medicaid expansion was "really free". Fredette apologized during the afternoon session in a speech on the House floor.

Fredette endorsed Sen. Marco Rubio for President in the 2016 election on July 2, 2015, while also announcing he would appear with Rubio in a Fourth of July parade in Wolfeboro, New Hampshire. He was also named the Rubio campaign's Maine chairman.

== Personal ==
Fredette resides in Newport, Maine and has two children. He is a past president of the board of directors of Sebasticook Valley Federal Credit Union.

Maine House of Representatives
Preceded by Joshua Tardy	Member of the Maine House of Representatives from the 25th district 2010–2014	Succeeded by Patrick Corey
Preceded by Roger A. Jackson	Member of the Maine House of Representatives from the 100th district 2014–2018	Succeeded by Danny Costain
Preceded by Danny Costain	Member of the Maine House of Representatives from the 33rd district 2024–present	Incumbent
Preceded by Emily Cain	Minority Leader of the Maine House of Representatives; 2012–2018	Succeeded by Kathleen Dillingham
