= Millar Civic Center =

Arena in Houlton, Maine

John A. Millar Civic Center
- Interactive map of John A. Millar Civic Center
- Former names: Millar Arena
- Location: Houlton, Maine
- Coordinates: 46.1337°N 67.82969°W
- Owner: Houlton, Maine
- Capacity: 3,260
- Type: Multi-purpose arena

Construction
- Opened: 2000

The John A. Millar Civic Center is an arena in Houlton, Maine with 630 bleacher seats and a maximum seating capacity of 3,260 with chairs on the arena floor. The building was rebuilt and expanded in 1999-2000 after the roof collapsed due to snow in 1998. The Millar Civic Center is widely known as a community center. The arena is used primarily for youth hockey as well as for fairs, trade shows and wedding receptions.
