= Clukey =

Clukey is a surname. Notable people with the surname include:

- Dean Clukey (1936–2019), American politician
- Julia Clukey (born 1985), American luger
