= Hodgdon, Maine =

Town in Maine, United States

- Town
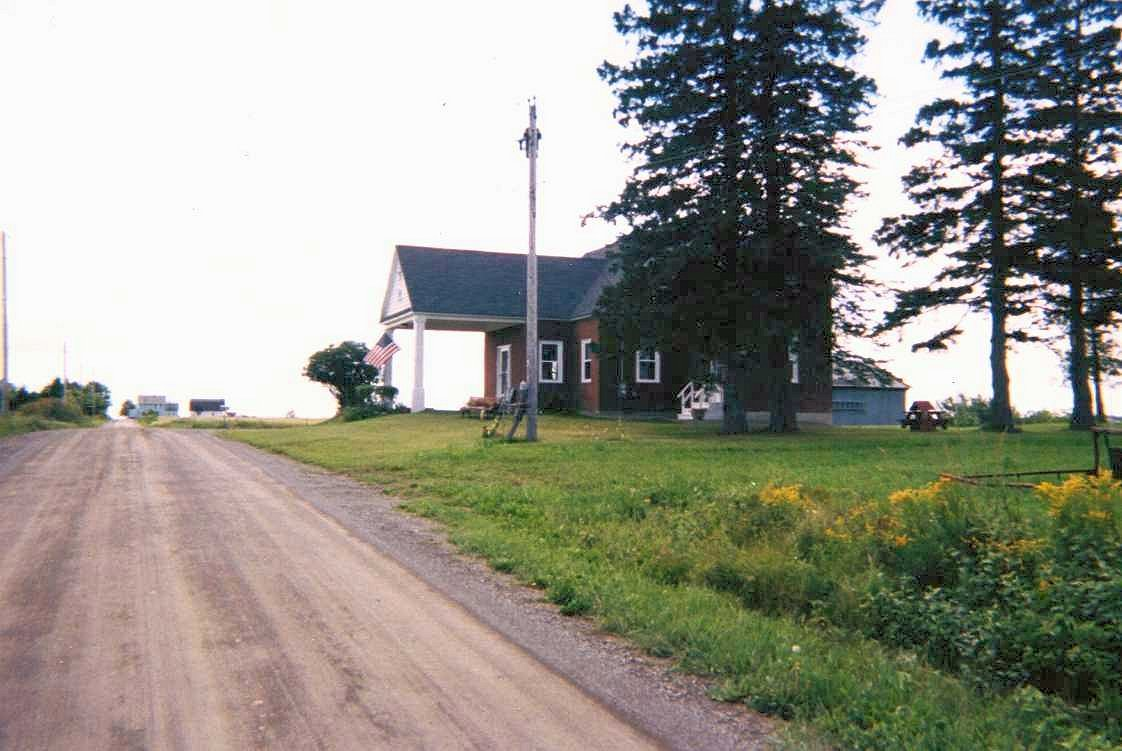
- Abandoned Border Station

- Location of Hodgdon, Maine
- Coordinates: 46°02′51″N 67°52′35″W
- Country: United States
- State: Maine
- County: Aroostook
- Villages: Hodgdon Mills; Hodgdon Corners; East Hodgdon

Area
  - Total: 39.97 sq mi (103.52 km^{2})
  - Land: 39.82 sq mi (103.13 km^{2})
  - Water: 0.15 sq mi (0.39 km^{2})
- Elevation: 515 ft (157 m)

Population (2020)
  - Total: 1,290
  - Density: 32/sq mi (12.5/km^{2})
- Time zone: UTC−5 (Eastern (EST))
  - Summer (DST): UTC−4 (EDT)
- ZIP Code: 04730
- Area code: 207
- FIPS code: 23-33385
- GNIS feature ID: 582521

Hodgdon is a rural town in Aroostook County, Maine, United States. The town borders the province of New Brunswick, Canada to the east and Houlton to the north. Hodgdon's population was 1,290 at the 2020 census.

== History ==
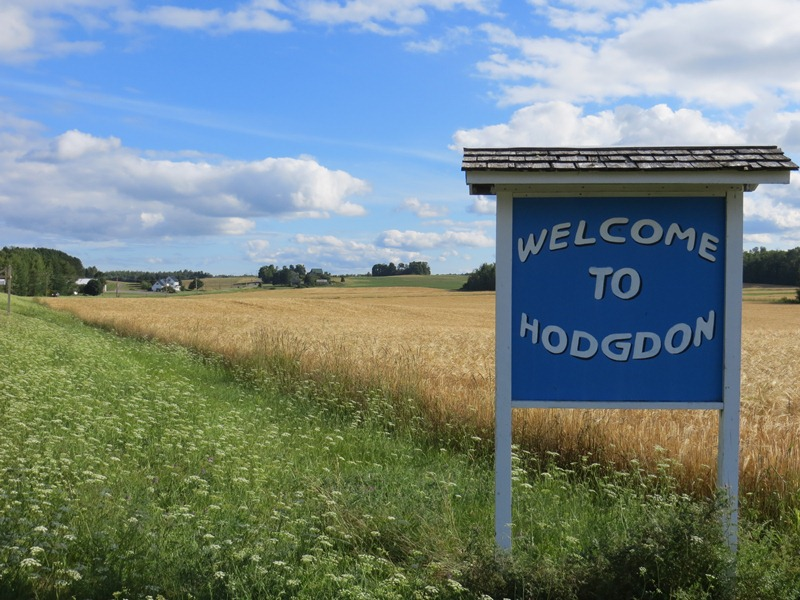
Hodgdon Welcome Sign

Hodgdon was incorporated in 1821. It was named for John Hodgdon, an early proprietor originally from Weare, New Hampshire. The town was mainly settled by Scotch-Irish immigrants from Northern Ireland. Hodgdon is located on the Canadian border in Southern Aroostook County. A substantial portion of the Lt. Gordon Manuel Wildlife Management Area, on the South Branch Meduxnekeag River, lies in the southwestern portion of the town in the Hodgdon Mills Village.

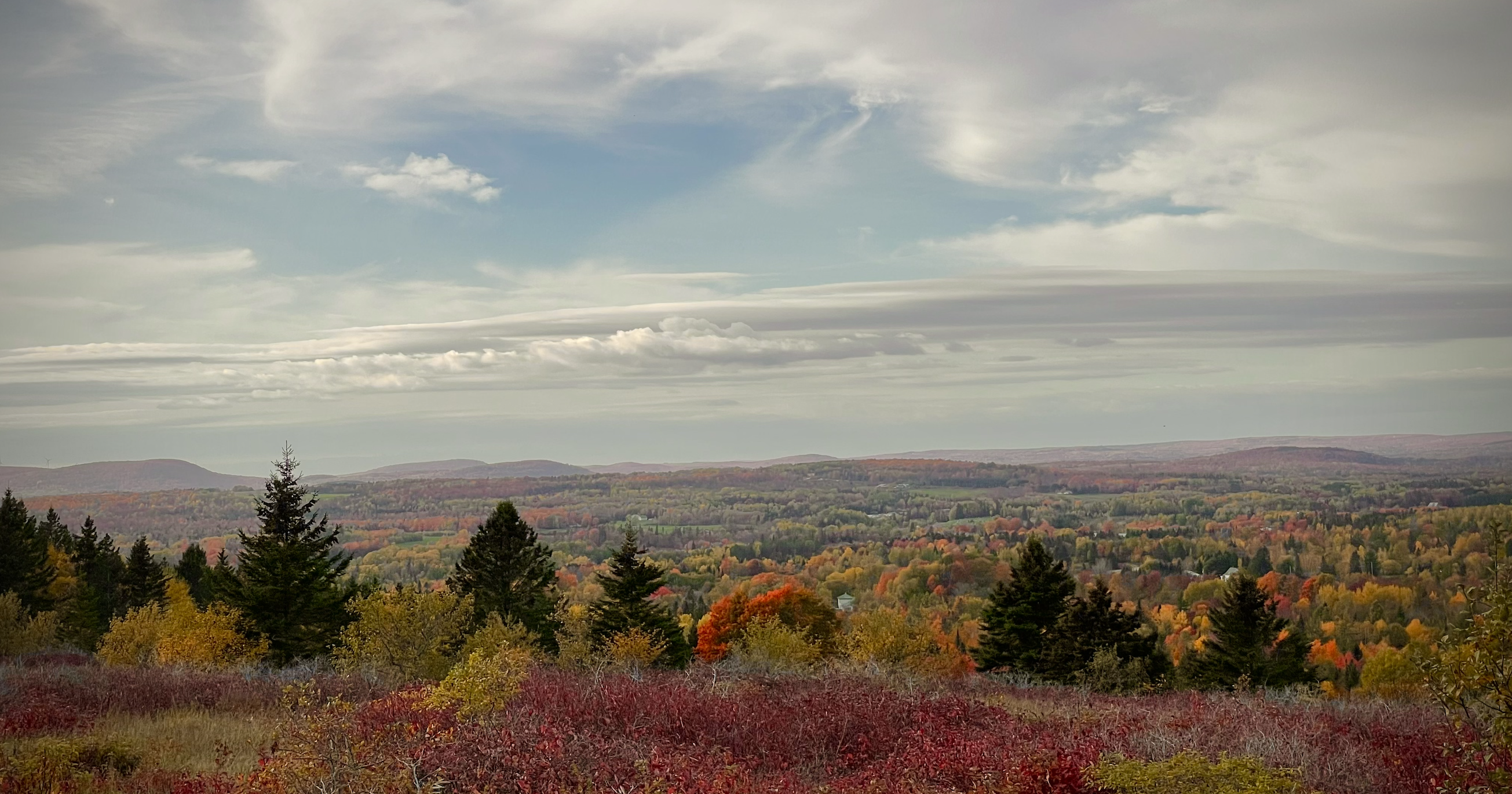
Fall foliage atop Hodgdon's Westford Hill

== Geography ==
According to the United States Census Bureau, the town has a total area of 39.97 square miles (103.52 km^{2}), of which 39.82 square miles (103.13 km^{2}) is land and 0.15 square miles (0.39 km^{2}) is water.

== Demographics ==
Historical population
Census	Pop.	Note	%±
1840	665		—
1850	862		29.6%
1860	963		11.7%
1870	989		2.7%
1880	1,089		10.1%
1890	1,113		2.2%
1900	1,130		1.5%
1910	1,153		2.0%
1920	1,070		−7.2%
1930	1,054		−1.5%
1940	1,076		2.1%
1950	1,162		8.0%
1960	926		−20.3%
1970	933		0.8%
1980	1,084		16.2%
1990	1,257		16.0%
2000	1,240		−1.4%
2010	1,309		5.6%
2020	1,290		−1.5%
U.S. Decennial Census

=== 2010 census ===
As of the census of 2010, there were 1,309 people, 515 households, and 372 families living in the town. The population density was 32.9 inhabitants per square mile (12.7/km^{2}). There were 568 housing units at an average density of 14.3 per square mile (5.5/km^{2}). The racial makeup of the town was 95.7% White, 0.1% African American, 1.4% Native American, 0.7% Asian, and 2.1% from two or more races. Hispanic or Latino of any race were 0.2% of the population.

There were 515 households, of which 31.3% had children under the age of 18 living with them, 59.6% were married couples living together, 8.0% had a female householder with no husband present, 4.7% had a male householder with no wife present, and 27.8% were non-families. 23.1% of all households were made up of individuals, and 12.3% had someone living alone who was 65 years of age or older. The average household size was 2.54 and the average family size was 2.97.

The median age in the town was 43.9 years. 23.7% of residents were under the age of 18; 6.9% were between the ages of 18 and 24; 20.5% were from 25 to 44; 32% were from 45 to 64; and 16.8% were 65 years of age or older. The gender makeup of the town was 50.5% male and 49.5% female.

The median income for a household in the town was $55,368, and the average household income was $70,020.

=== 2000 census ===
As of the census of 2000, there were 1,240 people, 462 households, and 359 families living in the town. The population density was 31.3 inhabitants per square mile (12.1/km^{2}). There were 489 housing units at an average density of 12.3 per square mile (4.7/km^{2}). The racial makeup of the town was 97.26% White, 0.48% African American, 1.21% Native American, and 1.05% from two or more races. Hispanic or Latino of any race were 0.81% of the population.

There were 462 households, out of which 34.6% had children under the age of 18 living with them, 68.2% were married couples living together, 7.4% had a female householder with no husband present, and 22.1% were non-families. 18.4% of all households were made up of individuals, and 8.4% had someone living alone who was 65 years of age or older. The average household size was 2.66 and the average family size was 3.04.

In the town, the population was spread out, with 26.6% under the age of 18, 6.6% from 18 to 24, 27.1% from 25 to 44, 27.0% from 45 to 64, and 12.7% who were 65 years of age or older. The median age was 39 years. For every 100 females there were 100.3 males. For every 100 females age 18 and over, there were 96.1 males.

== Education ==
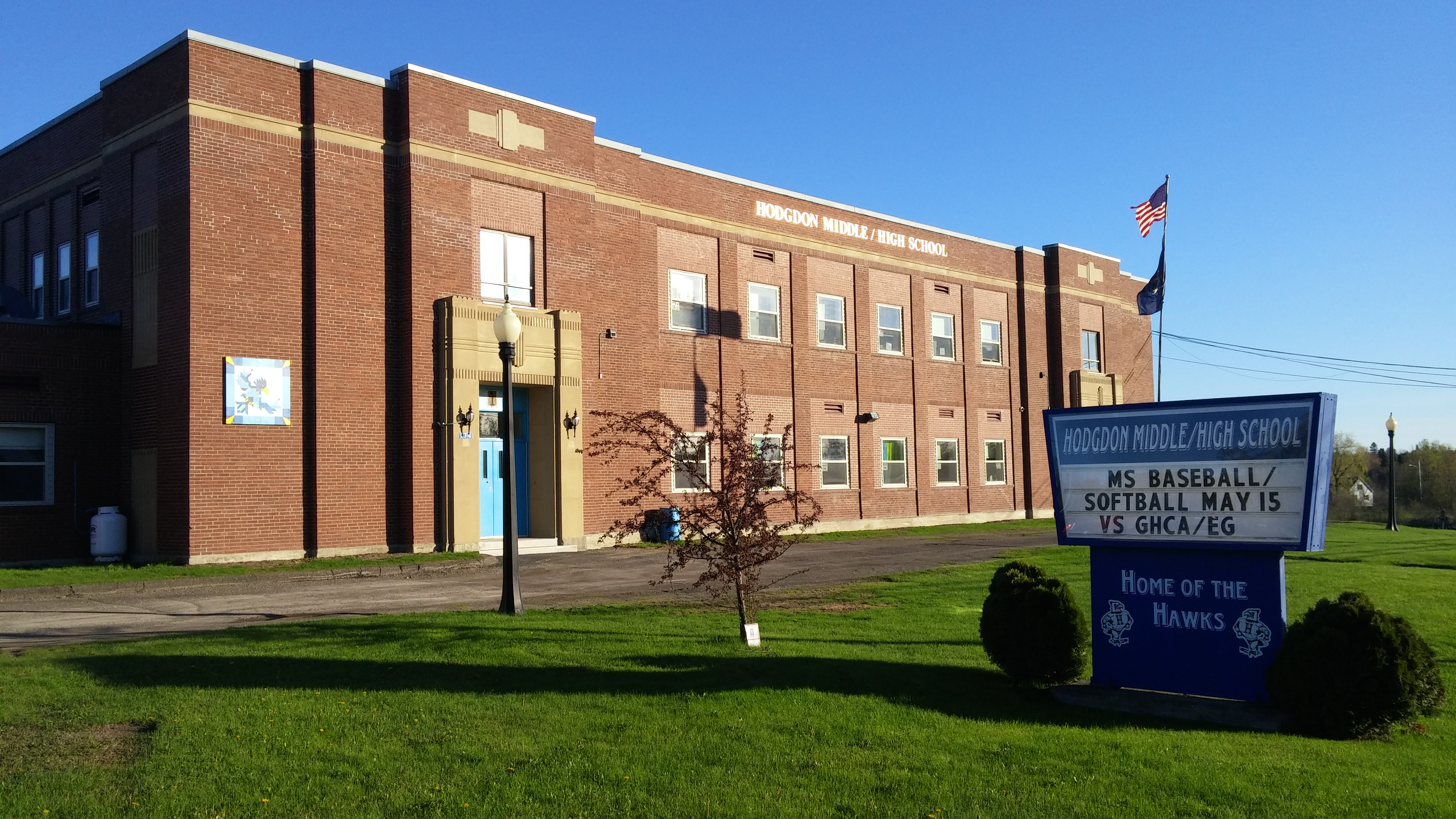
Present Day Hodgdon Middle/High School.

Hodgdon is part of the Maine School Administrative District #70, which also includes the nearby towns of Amity, Haynesville, Linneus, Ludlow and New Limerick. Hodgdon Middle/High School, a project during the Great Depression, was built in 1938 and newly renovated in 2016.

Hodgdon High School's teams are known as the "Hodgdon Hawks" in sporting events and are a member of the Maine Principals' Association. Hodgdon High School competes in Baseball, Basketball, Cross Country, Football, Golf, Ice Hockey, Soccer, Softball, and Track and Field. The school has won five basketball state championships (1979, 1980, 1995, 1996, 2014). Hodgdon High School shares local rivalries with Houlton Jr/Sr High School, Greater Houlton Christian Academy & Southern Aroostook Community School.

== Notable people ==
- Ira G. Hersey, US congressman (1917–1929)
- Roger Sherman, politician
- George Otis Smith, geologist
- Tracy Quint, politician
