= David Bowles =

David Bowles may refer to:

- David Bowles (American politician) (born 1944), American politician, representative in Maine
- David Bowles (Canadian politician), Quebec provincial politician
- David Bowles (chief executive), British public official
