= Houlton International Airport =

Airport in Maine

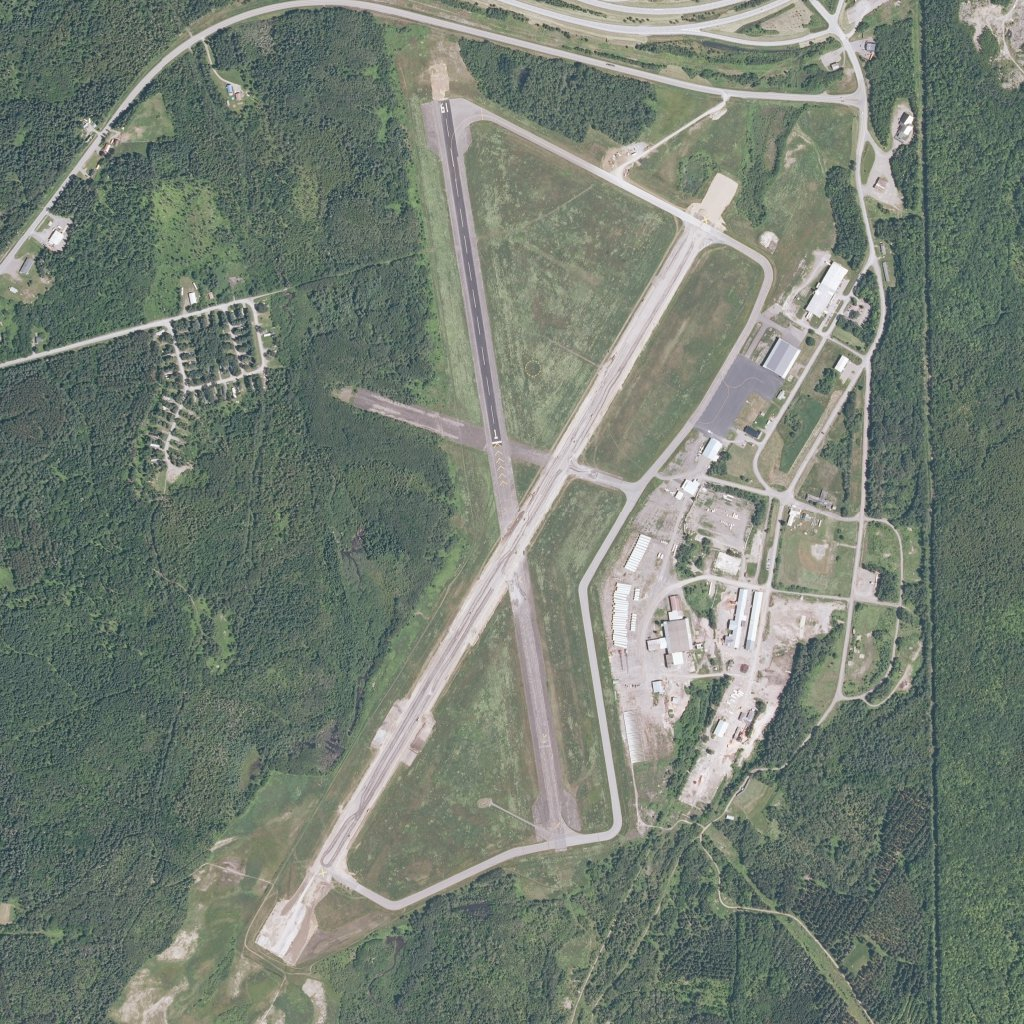
- USGS 2006 orthophoto
- IATA: HUL; ICAO: KHUL; FAA LID: HUL

Summary
- Airport type: Public
- Operator: Town of Houlton
- Serves: Houlton, Maine
- Location: Houlton, Maine
- Elevation AMSL: 489 ft (149 m)
- Coordinates: 46°07′23″N 067°47′31″W
- Website: www.houlton-maine.com/airport/

Maps
- FAA airport diagram
- Interactive map of Houlton International Airport

Runways
Direction	Length		Surface
Direction	ft	m	Surface
5/23	5,001	1,524	Asphalt
1/19	2,700	823	Asphalt

Houlton International Airport (IATA: HUL, ICAO: KHUL, FAA LID: HUL) is a public-use airport located in the town of Houlton in Aroostook County, Maine, United States, near the town border of Hodgdon, Maine, also on the border of New Brunswick, Canada. This general aviation airport is publicly owned by the town of Houlton. It once had scheduled airline service on Northeast Airlines.

== History ==
The airport originated as Houlton Army Air Base. Prior to the United States' entry into World War II, American army pilots flew planes to the base. They could not fly the planes directly into Canada, a member of the British Commonwealth, because that would violate the official United States position of neutrality. Local farmers used their tractors to tow the planes into Canada, where the Canadians closed the Woodstock highway so that aircraft could use it as a runway.

From October 1944 to May 1946, the air base housed Camp Houlton, a prisoner-of-war camp.

== Facilities ==
Houlton International Airport covers an area of 1,615 acres (654 ha) and has two runways:

- Runway 5/23: 5,001 x 150 ft (1,524 x 46 m), surface: asphalt
- Runway 1/19: 2,700 x 100 ft (823 x 30.5 m), surface: asphalt

== See also ==
- Maine World War II Army Airfields
- Air Transport Command
- List of airports in Maine
