= Roger Sherman (Maine politician) =

American politician (1940–2024)

Member of the Maine House of Representatives
- In office December 1998 – December 2004
- Preceded by: Dean Clukey
- Succeeded by: David Bowles
- Constituency: 142nd
- In office December 2004 – December 2006
- Preceded by: Thomas W. Murphy Jr.
- Succeeded by: Richard Cleary
- Constituency: 8th
- In office December 2014 – December 2018
- Preceded by: William Noon
- Succeeded by: Gregory Swallow
- Constituency: 144th

Member of the Maine Senate from the 34th district
- In office December 2006 – December 2014
- Preceded by: Dean Clukey
- Succeeded by: Ronald F. Collins

Personal details
- Born: October 7, 1940 Hodgdon, Maine, U.S.
- Died: July 14, 2024 (aged 83)
- Party: Republican
- Spouse: Patricia Sherman
- Children: 4
- Education: Ricker College (BA); University of Maine (JD); University of New Hampshire (MS)
- Profession: Farmer and schoolteacher

Roger L. Sherman (October 7, 1940 – July 14, 2024) was an American politician, farmer and schoolteacher from Hodgdon, Maine. Sherman was a Republican member of the Maine House of Representatives and Maine Senate. Sherman served in the Maine Legislature from 1998 to 2018.

Sherman graduated with a B.A. from the now-defunct Ricker College in Houlton, a master's degree in chemistry from the University of New Hampshire, and a Juris Doctor from the University of Maine School of Law. He was born, raised and lived in Hodgdon, Maine.

Sherman served as vice-chair of the rural caucus as a state representative. As a state senator, Sherman served on the Criminal Justice and Public Safety; Agriculture, Conservation and Forestry; and Judiciary committees, as well as the sub-committees on Elections, and Children and Families.

Maine House of Representatives
Preceded by Dean Clukey	Member of the Maine House of Representatives from the 142nd district 1998–2004	Succeeded by David Bowles
Preceded by Thomas W. Murphy Jr.	Member of the Maine House of Representatives from the 8th district 2004–2006	Succeeded by Richard Cleary
Preceded by William Noon	Member of the Maine House of Representatives from the 144th district 2014–2018	Succeeded by Gregory Swallow
Maine Senate
Preceded by Dean Clukey	Member of the Maine Senate from the 34th district 2006–2014	Succeeded by Ronald F. Collins
