= Joseph Bruno (Maine politician) =

American politician from Maine (born 1955)

- Born: November 26, 1955 (age 70); Flushing, New York, U.S.
- Years active: 1996–2004
- Known for: Minority Leader, Maine House of Representatives
- Political party: Republican

Joseph Bruno (born November 26, 1955) is an American politician from Maine. A Republican, Bruno served in the Maine House of Representatives from 1996 to 2004. He served two terms (2000 to 2002 and 2002 to 2004) as Minority Leader of the Maine House. He was unable to seek re-election in 2004 due to term limits and instead unsuccessfully sought election to the Maine Senate from District 12.

== Personal ==
Bruno was born on November 26, 1955, in Flushing, New York. He grew up in Hicksville, New York in the town of Oyster Bay on Long Island. After earning a degree from Northeastern University in 1978, Bruno moved to Maine. He initially settled in Washburn, Aroostook County, where he met his wife. He eventually settled in Raymond. He earned a M.B.A. from the University of Southern Maine in 1989. He is a resident of Raymond, Maine.

Maine House of Representatives
Preceded by P. Kelley Simpson	Member of the Maine House of Representatives from the 45th district 1992–1994	Succeeded by Harry G. True
Preceded by Thomas M. Tyler	Member of the Maine House of Representatives from the 38th district 1996–2004	Succeeded by Robert H. Crosthwaite
Preceded by Thomas W. Murphy Jr.	Minority Leader of the Maine House of Representatives; 2000–2004	Succeeded by David Bowles
