= Maine World War II Army Airfields =

Maine World War II Army Airfields
- Part of United States Army

Site information
- Type: Army Airfields

Site history
- Built: 1940–1944
- In use: 1940–present
- Battles/wars: World War II

During World War II, the United States Army Air Forces (USAAF) established numerous airfields in Maine for training pilots and aircrews of USAAF fighters and bombers.

Most of these airfields were under the command of First Air Force or the Army Air Forces Training Command (AAFTC). However the other USAAF support commands (Air Technical Service Command (ATSC); Air Transport Command (ATC) or Troop Carrier Command) commanded a significant number of airfields in a support roles.

It is still possible to find remnants of these wartime airfields. Many were converted into municipal airports, some were returned to agriculture and several were retained as United States Air Force installations and were front-line bases during the Cold War. Hundreds of the temporary buildings that were used survive today, and are being used for other purposes.

== Major airfields ==
First Air Force

- Dow AAF, Bangor

7th Army Air Force Base Unit
Was: Dow Air Force Base (1947 – 1968)
Now: Bangor Air National Guard Base and Bangor International Airport (IATA: BGR, ICAO: KBGR, FAA LID: BGR)

Air Transport Command

- Presque Isle AAF, Presque Isle

North Atlantic Wing, ATC
494th Army Air Force Base Unit
Was: Presque Isle Air Force Base (1948 – 1961)
Now: Northern Maine Regional Airport at Presque Isle (IATA: PQI, ICAO: KPQI, FAA LID: PQI)

- Houlton AAF, Houlton

North Atlantic Wing, ATC
378th Army Air Force Base Unit
Now: Houlton International Airport (IATA: HUL, ICAO: KHUL, FAA LID: HUL)

== Bibliography ==
- Maurer, Maurer. (1983). Air Force Combat Units Of World War II. Maxwell AFB, Alabama: Office of Air Force History. ISBN 0-89201-092-4.
- Ravenstein, Charles A. (1984). Air Force Combat Wings Lineage and Honors Histories 1947 – 1977. Maxwell AFB, Alabama: Office of Air Force History. ISBN 0-912799-12-9.
- Thole, Lou. (1999). Forgotten Fields of America: World War II Bases and Training, Then and Now - Volume 2. Pictorial Histories Pub. ISBN 1-57510-051-7.
