= Dean Clukey =

American politician (1936–2019)

Member of the Maine Senate from the 34th district
- In office 2004–2006
- Preceded by: Stephen Stanley
- Succeeded by: Roger Sherman

Member of the Maine House of Representatives
- In office 1992–1998

Captain of the Maine State Police
- In office 1962–1986

Personal details
- Born: Dean Francis Clukey; January 4, 1936 Dexter, Maine, U.S.
- Died: September 23, 2019 (aged 83)
- Party: Republican
- Spouse: Donna Clukey
- Children: 3
- Parent(s): Bernard Clukey; Louise Mossman
- Education: Ricker College (BS)
- Profession: Politician

Military service
- Allegiance: United States
- Branch/service: United States Air Force
- Years of service: 1955–1959
- Rank: Airman

Dean Francis Clukey (January 4, 1936 – September 23, 2019) was an American politician who served in the Maine Senate from 2004 to 2006, representing the 34th legislative district of Maine as a Republican. He previously served in the Maine House of Representatives from 1992 to 1998.

== Early life and education ==
Clukey was born in Dexter, Maine, on January 4, 1936, to Bernard Clukey and Louise Mossman. He obtained a Bachelor of Science from the now-defunct Ricker College in 1979.

Clukey served as an airman in the United States Air Force from 1955 to 1959.

== Career ==
Prior to his tenure in the Maine Legislature, Clukey served as captain of the Maine State Police from 1962 to 1986.

He served in the Maine House of Representatives from 1992 to 1998 as a Republican. In 2004, Clukey was elected to a single term in the Maine Senate, serving until 2006. His district included representation for much of Aroostook County, including the population centers of Houlton, Fort Fairfield and Presque Isle.

Clukey was preceded in office by Democrat Stephen Stanley and succeeded by Republican Roger Sherman.

== Political positions ==
Clukey received a 100% rating from the Maine Right to Life Committee from 1995 to 1997. He also received a 100% rating from the National Federation of Independent Business from 2005 to 2006.

== Personal life ==
Clukey was married and had three children. He resided in Houlton, Maine, and was a Catholic. He died at the age of 83 on September 23, 2019.

Maine House of Representatives
Preceded by Nason S. Graham	Member of the Maine House of Representatives from the 141st district 1992–1994	Succeeded by Henry L. Joy
Preceded by Mary H. MacBride	Member of the Maine House of Representatives from the 142nd district 1994–1998	Succeeded by Roger Sherman
Maine Senate
Preceded by Richard Nass	Member of the Maine Senate from the 34th district 2004–2006	Succeeded by Roger Sherman
