= Henry Joy =

Henry Joy may refer to:

- Henry Joy McCracken (1767–1798), Irish republican
- Henry Bourne Joy (1864–1936), American entrepreneur & activist
- Henry L. Joy (born 1933), American educator, activist, & politician
- Henry Joy (judge) (1767–1838), Irish judge
