= Joshua Tardy =

American lawyer

Minority Leader of the Maine House of Representatives
- In office December 6, 2006 – December 1, 2010
- Preceded by: David Bowles
- Succeeded by: Emily Cain

Member of the Maine House of Representatives
- In office December 4, 2002 – December 1, 2010
- Preceded by: Susan L. Kasprzak
- Succeeded by: Kenneth Fredette
- Constituency: 125th district (2002-2004); 25th district (2004-2010)

Personal details
- Born: Joshua Abraham Tardy; 1968 (age 57–58) Palmyra, Maine
- Party: Republican
- Education: University of Maine (BA, JD)

Joshua "Josh" Abraham Tardy (born 1968) is an American politician and attorney from Maine. A Republican, Tardy served in the Maine House of Representatives from the 125th and 25th districts from 2002 to 2010, including two terms (four years) as Minority Leader (2006-2010). He also served as Assistant Minority Leader from 2004 to 2006. He was unable to seek re-election due to term-limits.

He has practiced law since 1993. From 1993 to 1994 he was a litigation associate with the law firm of Rudman and Winchell. He later was co-owner of the Millennium Weddings and Convention Center and Moosehead Manufacturing before it closed in 2011. He later was a partner with the law firm of Irwin, Tardy & Morris. He now serves as Of Counsel for the law firm of Rudman and Winchell.

Before serving as a state representative he served as chairman of the Maine School Area District 48 Board. He now serves as chairman and commissioner of the Maine Commission on Indigent Legal Services.

During the spring of 2013, it was rumored that Tardy had begun assembling a campaign team in order to run for Maine's 2nd congressional district. However, Tardy did not run for Congress in 2014.

== Personal ==
Tardy was born in Palmyra, Maine and a resident of Newport, Maine. He graduated from the University of Maine (B.A., 1990) and the University of Maine School of Law (J.D., 1993). He serves on the Maine Central Institute Board of Trustees, President of the Nokomis Alumni Association and a member of Maine State Bar Association.
