= Donald F. Snow =

American politician (1877–1958)

Donald Snow

Member of the U.S. House of Representatives from Maine's 4th district
- In office March 4, 1929 – March 3, 1933
- Preceded by: Ira G. Hersey
- Succeeded by: Constituency abolished

Personal details
- Born: Donald Francis Snow; September 6, 1877 Bangor, Maine, U.S.
- Died: February 12, 1958 (aged 80) Gorham, Maine, U.S.
- Party: Republican
- Education: Bowdoin College (BA); University of Maine (LLB)

Donald Francis Snow (September 6, 1877 – February 12, 1958) was a member of the US House of Representatives from Maine.

== Early life and education ==
Snow was born in Bangor, Maine on September 6, 1877. He attended the public schools of his native city and was graduated from Bowdoin College, in Brunswick, Maine, in 1901. He later attended the law school of the University of Maine, earning a Juris Doctor in 1904.

== Political career ==
He was elected city solicitor of Bangor in 1906, serving until 1910; and he was prosecuting attorney of Penobscot County, Maine from 1911 to 1913.

Snow was elected as a Republican to the Seventy-first and Seventy-second Congresses, serving from March 4, 1929, to March 3, 1933. He was an unsuccessful candidate for renomination in 1932.

== Business career ==
Snow engaged in literary work in Washington, D.C. from 1933 to 1935. He moved to Gorham, Maine in 1936 and engaged in poultry farming until 1945. Snow was secretary for the E.C. Jones Insurance Corporation of Portland, Maine, and later had his own insurance business.

== Embezzlement conviction ==
In April 1935, Snow was committed to the Maine State Prison for two to four years for embezzlement, convicted of converting to his own use funds from two estates of which he was serving as executor. He was pardoned in December 1935.

== Death ==
Snow died in Gorham, Maine on February 12, 1958. He was originally buried at Evergreen Cemetery in Portland, but was later re-interred at Eastern Cemetery in Gorham.

== See also ==
- List of federal political scandals in the United States

U.S. House of Representatives
Preceded by Ira G. Hersey	Member of the U.S. House of Representatives from Maine's 4th congressional district 1929–1933	Constituency abolished
