= Ira G. Hersey =

American politician

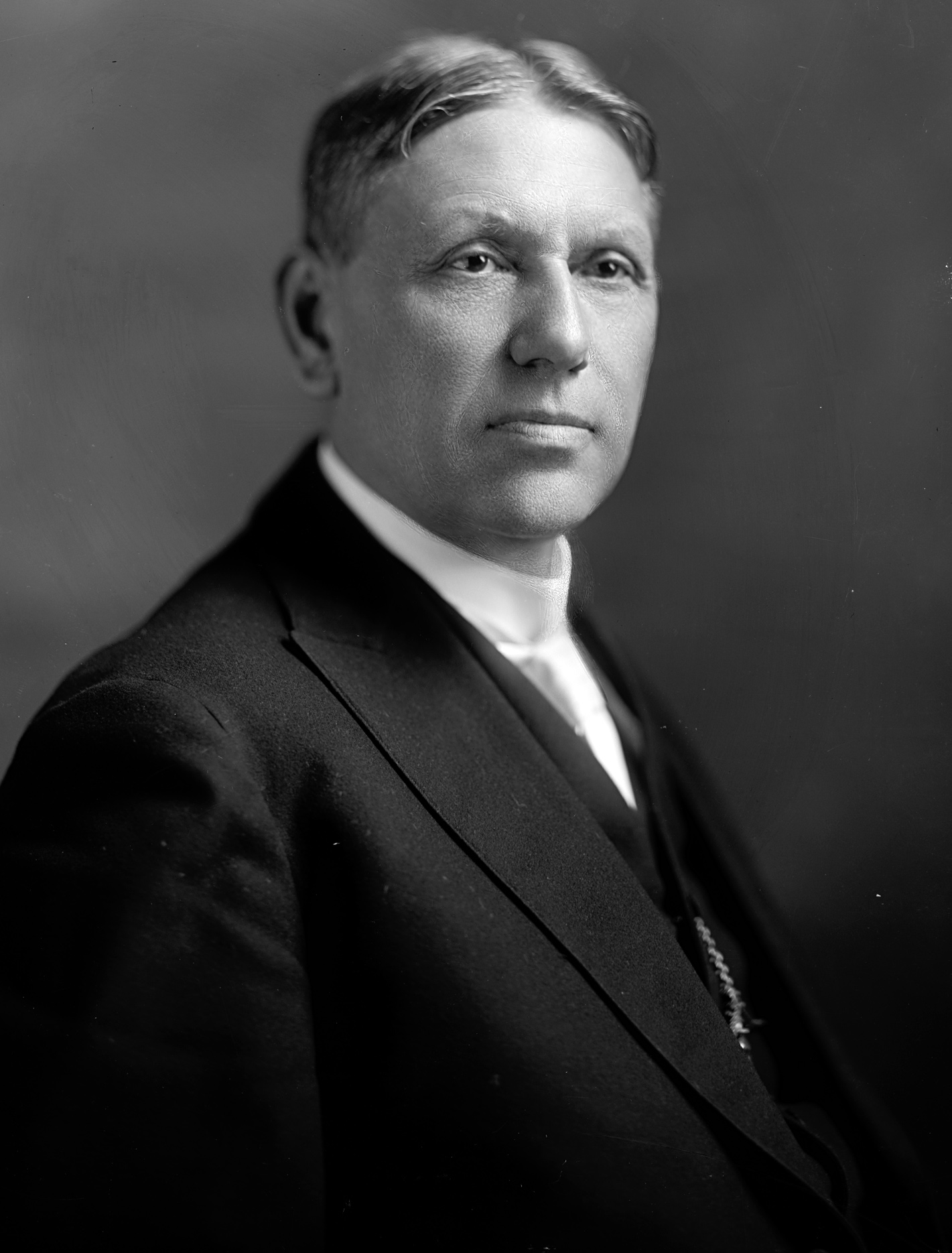

Member of the U.S. House of Representatives from Maine's 4th district
- In office March 4, 1917 – March 3, 1929
- Preceded by: Frank E. Guernsey
- Succeeded by: Donald F. Snow

74th President of the Maine Senate
- In office January 6, 1915 – January 3, 1917
- Preceded by: Carl Milliken
- Succeeded by: Taber D. Bailey

Member of the Maine Senate from the 16th district
- In office January 2, 1913 – January 3, 1917
- Succeeded by: August Peterson
- Constituency: Aroostook County

Member of the Maine House of Representatives from Houlton
- In office January 6, 1909 – January 2, 1913
- Preceded by: Donald A. H. Powers
- Succeeded by: Aaron A. Putnam

Personal details
- Born: Ira Greenlief Hersey; March 31, 1858 Hodgdon, Maine, U.S.
- Died: May 6, 1943 (aged 85) Washington, D.C., U.S.
- Party: Republican

Ira Greenlief Hersey (March 31, 1858 – May 6, 1943) was a politician from Hodgdon, Maine, who served in the Maine House of Representatives, the Maine State Senate, and most notably in the United States Congress as a Representative for the U.S. State of Maine.

== Biography ==
Hersey was born on March 31, 1858, in Hodgdon, Maine. He attended the public schools and Ricker Classical Institute. He studied law, was admitted to the bar in 1880 and commenced practice in Houlton.

He was an unsuccessful candidate for Governor of Maine in 1886. He was elected a member of the Maine House of Representatives from 1909 to 1912. He served in the Maine Senate from 1913 to 1916 and was president of that body in 1915 and 1916. He was elected as a Republican to the Sixty-fifth and to the five succeeding Congresses, serving from March 4, 1917, to March 3, 1929. He was chairman of the U.S. House Committee on Expenditures on Public Buildings in the Sixty-sixth Congress, and was one of the managers appointed by the House of Representatives in 1926 to conduct the impeachment proceedings against George W. English, judge of the United States District Court for the Eastern District of Illinois. He was an unsuccessful candidate for renomination in 1928 to the Seventy-first Congress.

He became judge of probate for Aroostook County, Maine, serving from 1934 until 1942, when he retired and moved to Washington, D.C. He died on May 6, 1943, in Washington and he was buried in Evergreen Cemetery in Houlton, Maine.

== Congressional career ==
Hersey supported the Immigration Act of 1924, saying during a speech in the House of Representatives the United States was "a mighty land settled by Northern Europeans from the United Kingdom, the Norsemen, and the Saxon."

U.S. House of Representatives
Preceded by Frank E. Guernsey	Member of the U.S. House of Representatives from Maine's 4th congressional district March 4, 1917 – March 3, 1929	Succeeded by Donald F. Snow
Political offices
Preceded by Carl E. Milliken	President of the Maine Senate; 1915-1916	Succeeded by Taber D. Bailey
Legal offices
Preceded by	Judge of Probate for Aroostook County, Maine; 1934-1942	Succeeded by
