= Daniel Ankeles =

American politician

Member of the Maine House of Representatives from the 100th district
- Incumbent
- Assumed office December 7, 2022
- Preceded by: Danny Costain

Personal details
- Born: Peabody, Massachusetts, U.S.
- Party: Democratic
- Spouse: Catherine
- Children: 2
- Education: Bachelor's degree
- Alma mater: University of Chicago
- Website: https://danankelesforbrunswick.com/

Daniel Ankeles is an American politician who has served as a member of the Maine House of Representatives since December 7, 2022. He represents Maine's 100th House district. Before being elected he worked, as a Democratic legislative aide for nine years.

== Electoral history ==
Ankeles was elected on November 8, 2022, in the 2022 Maine House of Representatives election. He assumed office on December 7, 2022.

== Biography ==
Ankeles earned a bachelor's degree from the University of Chicago in 2004. He is Jewish.

Maine House of Representatives
Preceded by Danny Costain	Member of the Maine House of Representatives; 2022–present	Succeeded by incumbent
