= Meduxnekeag River =

Meduxnekeag River: Metaksonekiyak
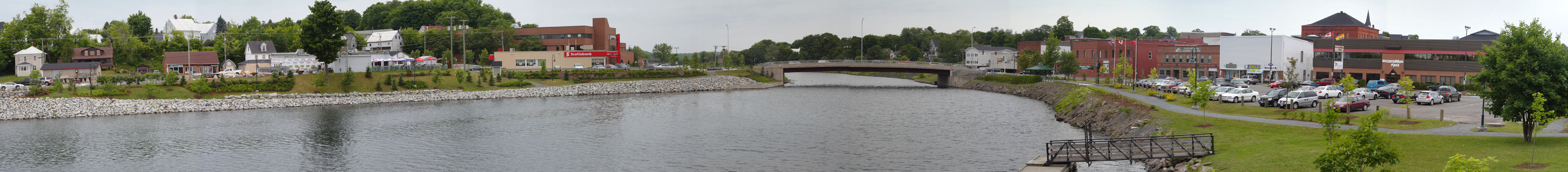

Location
- Countries: United States, Canada

Physical characteristics
- Source
  - location: Maine
- Mouth
  - location: Saint John River
  - coordinates: 46°08′52″N 67°34′22″W
  - elevation: 170 feet (52 m)
- Length: about 35 miles (56 km)

Basin features
- Progression: St. John — Bay of Fundy
- Tributaries
  - left: North Branch Meduxnekeag River
  - right: South Branch Meduxnekeag River

The Meduxnekeag River (/məˈdʌksnəkɛɡ/ mə-DUKS-nə-keg), Wolastoqey: Metaksonekiyak) is a tributary of the Saint John River. It is about 35 miles (56 km) long. The North Branch Meduxnekeag River rises from the outlet of a small pond (46°21′40″N 68°03′18″W) in Maine and runs to its confluence with the Meduxnekeag in Wakefield, New Brunswick. The South Branch Meduxnekeag River rises from the outflow of Johnson Pond (46°02′07″N 67°55′16″W) in Linneus, and runs to its confluence with the Meduxnekeag River two miles upstream from Houlton, Maine. The Meduxnekeag joins the Saint John in Woodstock, New Brunswick.

The earliest mention of the name is in the narrative of John Gyles. He states that in 1689 he visited a branch of the St. John river about ten miles to a branch called Medeockseenecasis. The suffix "asis" is a diminutive so it is possible that the name is a form of Little Meductic. The current spelling was first seen in 1840.

In New Brunswick, the watershed of the Meduxnekeag is home to the highest concentration of remnant sites of mature Appalachian Hardwood Forest in Atlantic Canada, containing many understorey plants rare or uncommon in the province. These include black raspberry, wild ginger, maidenhair fern, showy orchis, wild coffee, and numerous others. The non-profit Meduxnekeag River Association Inc., based in Woodstock, has purchased, since 1998, approximately 2.25 square kilometres (500 acres) of forest, with more than 6 km (3.7 mi) of undeveloped shoreline. This Meduxnekeag Valley Nature Preserve has more than 10 km (6.2 mi) of well-marked, low impact walking trails.

Animals commonly found in the watershed include the moose, white-tailed deer, black bear, eastern coyote, red fox, raccoon, beaver, eastern chipmunk, striped skunk, red squirrel, snowshoe hare, mink, weasels, porcupine, and various mice, voles, and shrews.

Significant sections of the Meduxnekeag are easy to canoe or kayak in high or medium water conditions (generally in May and June, and in September and October; also in July/August in wet summers). Annual canoe races are held in both Maine and New Brunswick in May. Recreational canoeists traditionally put in just below the bridge on the North Branch (just above the confluence) and take out in downtown Woodstock, a half-day canoe depending on lingering time, passing through scenic, mostly forested country. The final 2 km before Woodstock is through an extensive wetland.

The intervales and islands of the Meduxnekeag are locally celebrated for the edible fiddlehead ostrich fern, harvested in May.

== See also ==
- List of rivers of Maine
- List of rivers of New Brunswick
