= Camp Houlton =

Camp Houlton was a United States prisoner-of-war camp that operated from October 1944 to May 1946 at the former Houlton Army Air Base in Houlton, Maine.

The camp was used to house more than 1,100 German prisoners-of-war during World War II. Some of the prisoners were allowed to work on local farms. They received scrip for their efforts, which could be redeemed for goods at the camp store.

The site is now Houlton International Airport.

== See also ==
- List of World War II prisoner-of-war camps in the United States
