= Dave Cloutier =

American football player (1938–2017)

No. 29, 84, 28, 33
- Position: Safety

Personal information
- Born: November 22, 1938; Gardiner, Maine, U.S.
- Died: November 6, 2017 (aged 78); Palm Coast, Florida, U.S.
- Listed height: 6 ft 0 in (1.83 m)
- Listed weight: 195 lb (88 kg)

Career information
- High school: Gardiner (ME)
- College: South Carolina (1957); Maine (1958–1961)
- NFL draft: 1962: 18th round, 242nd overall pick

Career history

Playing
- Buffalo Bills (1962)*; Portland Sea Hawks (1962–1963); Boston Patriots (1964)
- * Offseason or practice squad member only

Coaching
- Kennebunk HS (ME) (1962–1963) Head coach

Awards and highlights
- All-Yankee (1961); All-Maine (1961)

Career AFL statistics
- Games played: 12
- Stats at Pro Football Reference

David Lee Cloutier (November 22, 1938 – November 6, 2017) was an American professional football safety in the American Football League (AFL) for the Boston Patriots. He played college football at the University of Maine.

== Early life ==
Cloutier attended Gardiner High School in Maine, where he practiced football, basketball and track. In football he was a two-way player, running back on offense and safety on defense. As a senior, he scored a then school-record 114 points and received All-state honors. He contributed to a 22–1–1 record in his three seasons and two Class B state championships (1954 and 1955).

Coultier was named to the All-State basketball team as a senior. In track, he set the state high school javelin record as a senior. He was second in the state in four events: javelin, high hurdles, broad jump and high jump.

== College career ==
Cloutier accepted a football scholarship from the University of South Carolina. He transferred to the University of Maine after his freshman year, where he was a two-way player for the team.

In 1959, he tied a school record with 159 rushing yards against Bates College, while also leading the team in rushing and scoring. In 1960, although he was limited by injuries, he finished second on the team in rushing. In 1961 as a senior, he led the team in scoring and finished second on the team in receiving, while contributing to an undefeated season. He finished his career with 174 carries for 1,025 yards and 92 points (seventh in school history).

In 1993, he was inducted into the University of Maine Sports Hall of Fame. In 2010, he was inducted into the Maine Sports Hall of Fame.

== Professional career ==
=== Buffalo Bills ===
Cloutier was selected by the Dallas Cowboys in the eighteenth round (242nd overall) of the 1962 NFL draft. After failing to come to terms with the Cowboys, he chose to sign as an undrafted free agent with the Buffalo Bills of the American Football League on January 4, 1962. He was tried at offensive end to take advantage of his speed, before suffering an ankle injury and being later waived.

=== Portland Sea Hawks ===
In 1962, after being released from the Buffalo Bills, Cloutier signed with the Portland Sea Hawks of the Atlantic Coast Football League (ACFL). He resigned with the team for the 1963 season.

=== Boston Patriots ===
On March 3, 1964, Cloutier signed with the Boston Patriots of the American Football League (AFL). He became the first Maine native to play for the franchise.

Cloutier was converted into a free safety. He was cut on September 8, but was later re-signed. He was mostly used as a punt returner on special teams. He started in the American Football Conference Championship game against the Buffalo Bills. He was released on August 31, 1965.

== Personal life ==
In 1962, while Cloutier was playing for the Portland Sea Hawks, he was the head football coach for Kennebunk High School. In his first season he led the team to a 4–2–2 record. In his last season, in 1963, he led the team to a 2–4–1 record. He resigned after he signed with the Patriots. He was an assistant coach for the basketball team and was the head baseball coach for one season.

After football, Cloutier returned to Maine to work in real estate, which he continued after he moved to Florida. He died on November 6, 2017.

== Head coaching record ==
=== Football ===
Year	Team	Overall	Conference	Standing	Bowl/playoffs
Kennebunk Rams () (1962–1963)
1962	Kennebunk	4–2–2			
1963	Kennebunk	2–4–1			
Kennebunk:		6–6–3			
Total:		6–6–3			
