= Stephen Stanley =

American politician

Member of the Maine House of Representatives from the 139th district
- In office December 1996 – December 2002

Member of the Maine House of Representatives from the 10th district
- In office December 2012 – December 2014

Member of the Maine House of Representatives from the 143rd district
- Incumbent
- Assumed office December 2014
- Preceded by: Anne-Marie Mastraccio

Member of the Maine Senate from the 34th district
- In office December 2002 – December 2004
- Succeeded by: Dean Clukey

Personal details
- Born: December 22, 1952 (age 73) Millinocket, Maine
- Party: Democratic

Stephen Stanley is an American politician, who has served in the Maine House of Representatives since 2012. He represents the 143rd district as a member of the Maine Democratic Party.

He previously served in the House of Representatives from 1996 to 2002, and in the Maine Senate from 2002 to 2004.
