= Robert H. Crosthwaite =

American politician

Robert H. Crosthwaite is an American politician from Maine. A Republican, Crosthwaite represented District 38, which included Ellsworth, Otis and Trenton, all in Hancock County while in the Maine House of Representatives. He served from 2002 to 2008, including two years (2006-2008) as Assistant Minority Leader.

Crosthwaite has also served multiple terms on the Ellsworth City Council, including re-election in November 2012.

Maine House of Representatives
Preceded by Edward J. Povich	Member of the Maine House of Representatives from the 127th district 2002–2004	Succeeded by Darlene J. Curley
Preceded by Joseph Bruno	Member of the Maine House of Representatives from the 38th district 2004–2008	Succeeded by Brian Langley
