= Joe Rafferty (Maine politician) =

American politician

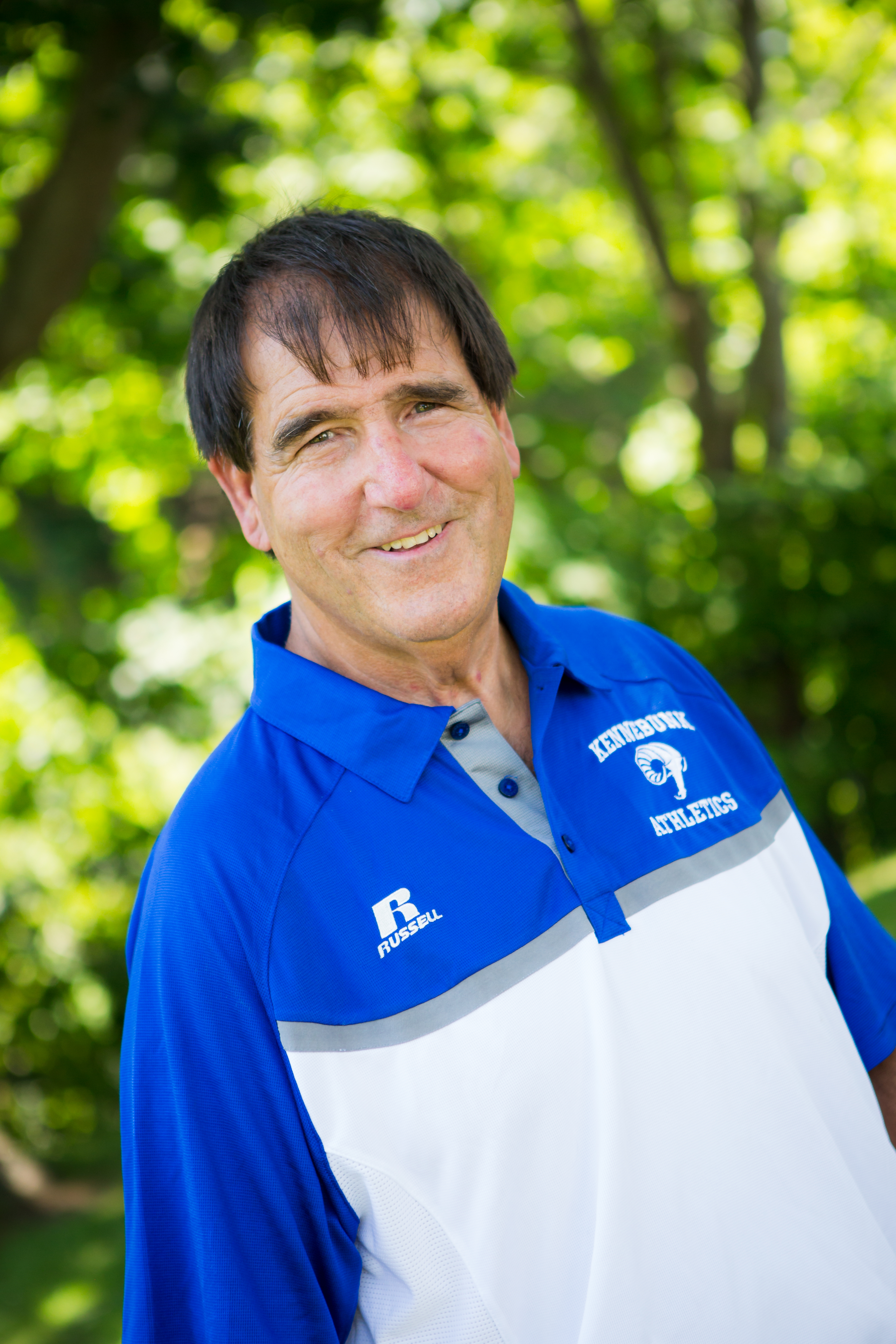

Member of the Maine Senate from the 34th district
- Incumbent
- Assumed office December 2, 2020
- Preceded by: Robert Foley

Personal details
- Born: 1955 (age 70–71) Woburn, Massachusetts
- Party: Democratic
- Spouse: Norma Nardone
- Children: 3
- Occupation: Retired teacher, football coach
- Website: https://rafferty.mainecandidate.com/

Joseph Rafferty Jr. (born 1955) is an American educator, high school gridiron football coach, and Democratic politician from Maine. Rafferty has been the head coach of the Kennebunk High School Rams football team since 1979 and is currently serving his first term in the Maine Senate representing District 34, which consists of Kennebunk, Wells, Acton, Lebanon, North Berwick, and part of Berwick. Rafferty was born in 1955 and grew up in Woburn, Massachusetts. He attended Springfield College, graduated in 1977 and began teaching and coaching at Kennebunk High School in 1978. As an educator, he was active in the teachers' unions and helped negotiate contracts on their behalf. He retired from full-time teaching in 2018 but continues to coach football. Rafferty was first elected to the Maine Senate in 2020.

== Early life, education & teaching career ==
Rafferty was born in 1955 in Woburn, Massachusetts, one of six children. His father worked in a tannery and as a postal worker, and his mother was a homemaker and school cafeteria worker. His first job was at Woburn's Spence Farm as a teenager, and he attended Springfield College and graduated with a degree in physical education in 1977. He was the first person in his family to graduate from college.

Rafferty was first hired to a teaching and coaching job in Foxborough that fell through in late summer, and he drove to Maine to interview at Kennebunk High School having never been to Maine before. He began teaching and coaching at Kennebunk High School in 1978 and was the assistant football coach for one year before taking over as head coach in 1979. Rafferty was on the teachers' union executive board and negotiating team and retired from full-time teaching in 2018, although he continues to coach, substitute teach and drive buses for the school district.

On October 4, 2019, Rafferty won his 200th game as head coach of the Kennebunk Rams. As of the end of the 2020 season, he has a record of 204-177, a 1991 state championship and three trips to the championship game in 1999, 2013 and 2016.

== Maine Senate ==
Rafferty was approached to run for office several times during his teaching career, but explained in 2020 that he had always suggested a post-retirement run as a better fit. When he retired in 2018, friends and colleagues including Maine Senate President Troy Jackson "came back after me again,” beginning in July 2019. He announced his run in February 2020. Rafferty was a clean elections candidate and used "Coach Joe" campaign signs. He ran unopposed in the Democratic primary and defeated Republican Michael Pardue in the general election 52%-48%. He was later re-elected in 2022 and 2024, both times against Republican Bradley Ducharme. Rafferty has been the chair of the Education & Cultural Affairs committee since 2020.

== Personal life ==
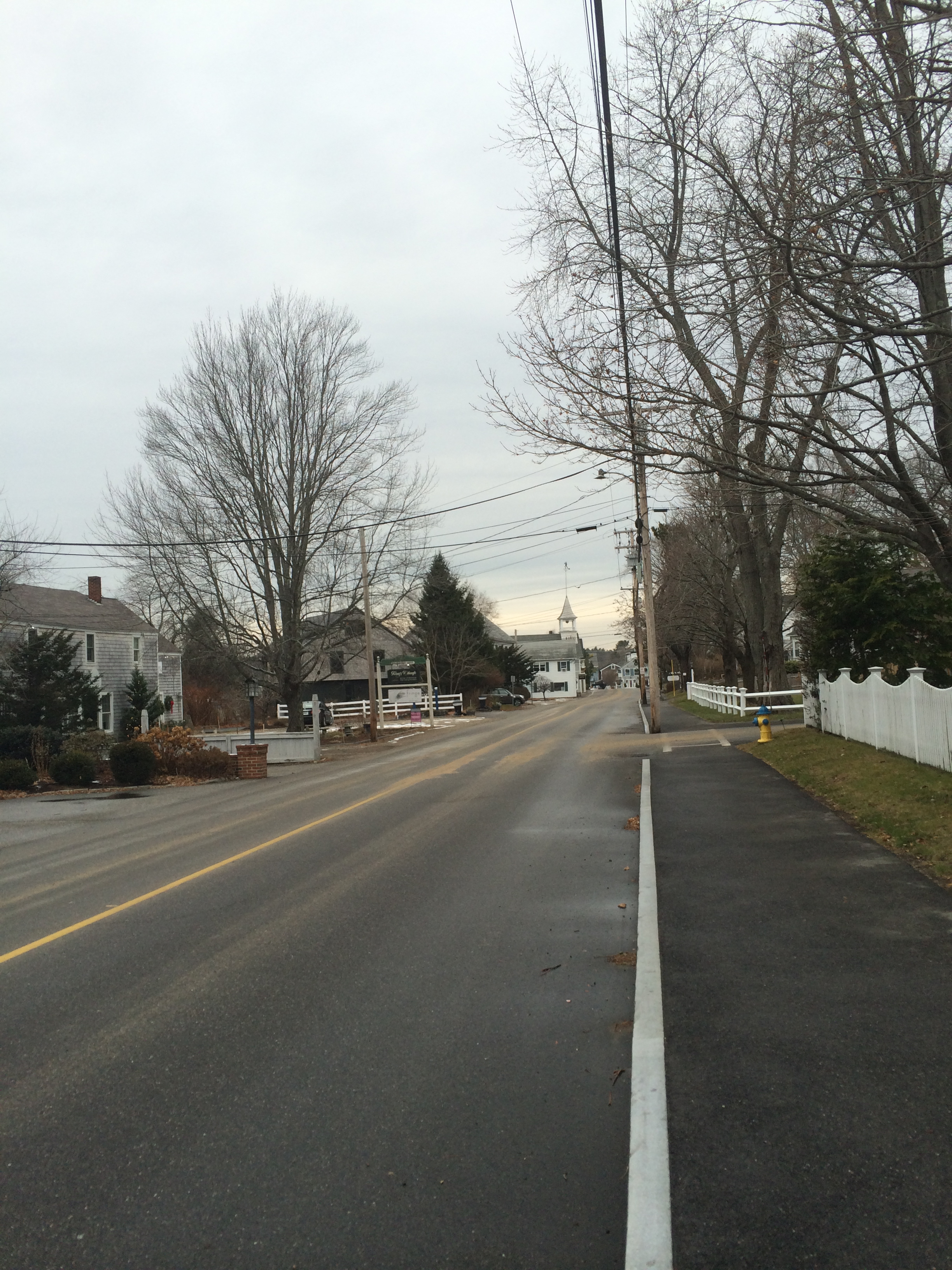
Rafferty and his wife live and work in Kennebunk, Maine.

Rafferty and his wife Norma Nardone, a teacher, live in Kennebunk, Maine. They have three adult daughters. Rafferty enjoys being outdoors: Fishing, hiking, boating, golf, skiing, canoeing, running and biking "as much as possible".

== Electoral record ==
2020 Maine Senate District 34 Democratic primary
Party	Candidate	Votes	%
Democratic	Joe Rafferty	4,538	100.0%
Total votes		4,538	100.0%

2020 Maine Senate District 34 General Election
Party	Candidate	Votes	%
Democratic	Joe Rafferty	13,949	51.9%
Republican	Michael Pardue	12,947	48.1%
Total votes			100.0%

2022 Maine Senate District 34 Democratic primary
Party	Candidate	Votes	%
Democratic	Joe Rafferty	2,541	100.0%
Total votes		2,541	100.0%

2022 Maine Senate District 34 General Election
Party	Candidate	Votes	%
Democratic	Joe Rafferty	12,605	58.2%
Republican	Bradley Ducharme	9,044	41.8%
Total votes		21,649	100.0%

2024 Maine Senate District 34 Democratic primary
Party	Candidate	Votes	%
Democratic	Joe Rafferty	3,350	100.0%
Total votes		3,350	100.0%

2024 Maine Senate District 34 General Election
Party	Candidate	Votes	%
Democratic	Joe Rafferty	15,064	55.8%
Republican	Bradley Ducharme	11,941	44.2%
Total votes		27,005	100.0%
