= Jean E. Howard =

American specialist in literature, university teacher, and writer

- Born: October 20, 1948 (age 77); Houlton, Maine

Academic background
- Education: Brown University; University of London; Yale University

Jean Elizabeth Howard (born October 20, 1948, in Houlton, Maine) is an American professor in English studies and a Shakespeare scholar. She is George Delacorte Professor in the Humanities at Columbia University and a former trustee of Brown University.

== Life and works ==
Howard earned a BA at Brown University in 1970 and graduated from the University of London in 1972 with a master's degree after she was awarded a Marshall Scholarship. She received a PhD at Yale University in 1975. From 1975 she taught at Syracuse University. She has been the recipient of Guggenheim- (1999), Folger-, and Huntington Fellowships. In 2010 she held the Leonard Hastings Schoff Memorial Lecture on Staging History; Imagining the Nation at Columbia University, where she is the George Delacorte Professor in the Humanities. Her research interests are mainly focus on Shakespeare, early-modern poetry and drama, as well as Feminist and Marxist theory. She has also published studies on Shakespeare, Pope, Ford, Heywood, Dekker, Marston and Jonson.

From 1996 to 1999 she was the Director of the Institute for Research on Women and Gender at Columbia University. From 1999 to 2000 she was the President of the Shakespeare Association of America. From 2004 to 2007 she was Vice Provost for Diversity Initiatives, and from 2008 to 2011 Head of the Department of English Language and Comparative Literary Studies. She represents Brown University's retired professors and heads Brown University's Equal Opportunity effort. She is also a consultant at the Pembroke Center for Teaching and Research on Women and one of the senators of Phi Beta Kappa. In 2016 she received an honorary degree from Brown University.

== Selected publications ==
- Shakespeare's Art of Orchestration (1984)
- Shakespeare Reproduced: The Text in History and Ideology (1987) with Marion O'Connor
- The Stage and Struggle in Early Modern England (1994)
- Engendering a Nation: A Feminist Account of Shakespeare's English Histories (1997) with Phyllis Rackin
- Marxist Shakespeares (2000) with Scott Shershow
- Theater of a City: The Places of London Comedy 1598-1642 (2007) University of Pennsylvania Press
- Shakespeare and Marx (2012) with Crystal Bartolovich
- The Norton Shakespeare co-editor (2nd ed. 2007, 3rd ed. 2016);
- Bedford Contextual Editions of Shakespeare general editor.
