= Maine's 33rd State Senate district =

Maine state legislative district

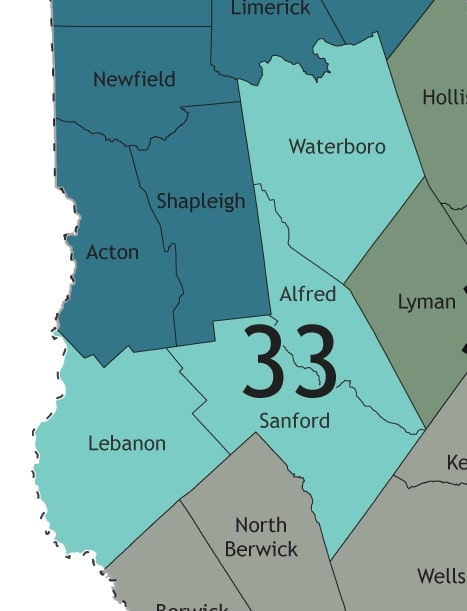
Senator
| Matthew Harrington; R–Sanford |
- Population (2020): 39,814

Maine's 33rd State Senate district is one of 35 districts in the Maine Senate. It has been represented by Republican Matthew Harrington since 2022.

== Geography ==
District 33 includes a small part of York, including the county seat of Alfred. The district also The district lies on the border between Maine and New Hampshire, at the edge of the town of Lebanon.

York County = 18.8% of county

City:

- Sanford

Towns:

- Alfred (county seat)
- Lebanon
- Waterboro

== Recent election results ==
=== 2022 ===
2022 Maine State Senate election, District 33
| Party | Candidate | Votes | % |
|---|---|---|---|
| Republican | Matthew Harrington | 8,509 | 54.1 |
| Democratic | Kendra Williams | 7,228 | 45.9 |
| Total votes | | 15,737 | 100.0 |
| Republican hold | | | |

Elections prior to 2022 were held under different district lines.

=== 2024 ===
2024 Maine State Senate election, District 33
| Party | Candidate | Votes | % |
|---|---|---|---|
| Republican | Matthew Harrington | 12,432 | 60.6 |
| Democratic | Daniel Lauzon | 8,076 | 39.4 |
| Total votes | | 20,508 | 100.0 |
| Republican hold | | | |

== Historical election results ==
=== 2012 ===
2012 Maine State Senate election, District 33
| Party | Candidate | Votes | % |
|---|---|---|---|
| Republican | Andre Cushing | 11,985 | 60.9 |
| Democratic | Sherman Leighton | 7,705 | 39.1 |
| Total votes | | 19,690 | 100 |
| Republican hold | | | |

=== 2014 ===
2014 Maine State Senate election, District 33
| Party | Candidate | Votes | % |
|---|---|---|---|
| Republican | David Woodsome | 8,736 | 57.1 |
| Democratic | John Tuttle | 6,033 | 39.4 |
| Blank votes | None | 527 | 3.4 |
| Total votes | | 15,296 | 100 |
| Republican gain from Democratic | | | |

(Note: This election was a Republican gain, as Tuttle had been redistricted from the 3rd district in early 2014.)

=== 2016 ===
2016 Maine State Senate election, District 33
| Party | Candidate | Votes | % |
|---|---|---|---|
| Republican | David Woodsome | 11,672 | 59.6 |
| Democratic | Andrea Boland | 7,922 | 40.4 |
| Total votes | | 19,594 | 100 |
| Republican hold | | | |

=== 2018 ===
2018 Maine State Senate election, District 33
| Party | Candidate | Votes | % |
|---|---|---|---|
| Republican | David Woodsome | 9,030 | 58.9 |
| Democratic | John Tuttle | 6,298 | 41.1 |
| Total votes | | 15,328 | 100 |
| Republican hold | | | |

=== 2020 ===
2020 Maine State Senate election, District 33
| Party | Candidate | Votes | % |
|---|---|---|---|
| Republican | David Woodsome | 13,408 | 62.8 |
| Democratic | Michael McKinney | 7,947 | 37.2 |
| Total votes | | 21,355 | 100 |
| Republican hold | | | |
