= Emily Cain =

American politician (born 1980)

Member of the Maine Senate from the 30th district
- In office December 5, 2012 – December 3, 2014
- Preceded by: Elizabeth Schneider
- Succeeded by: Jim Dill

Minority Leader of the Maine House of Representatives
- In office December 1, 2010 – December 5, 2012
- Preceded by: Joshua Tardy
- Succeeded by: Kenneth Fredette

Member of the Maine House of Representatives from the 19th district
- In office January 1, 2005 – December 5, 2012
- Preceded by: Jonathan Thomas
- Succeeded by: Ryan Tipping-Spitz

Personal details
- Born: Emily Ann Cain; March 29, 1980 (age 46) Louisville, Kentucky, U.S.
- Party: Democratic
- Spouse: Daniel Williams
- Education: University of Maine (BA, PhD); Harvard University (MEd)
- Website: Campaign website

Emily Ann Cain (born March 29, 1980) is an American politician from Maine and former executive director of EMILYs List. A member of the Democratic Party, Cain served in the Maine Senate from 2012 to 2014, representing the 30th district which includes part of Penobscot County. She was previously a member of the Maine House of Representatives from 2004 to 2012, where she served as Minority Leader from 2008 to 2010 and as House Chair of the Appropriations & Financial Affairs Committee from 2010 to 2012.

Cain was the 2014 and 2016 Democratic nominee for the U.S. House of Representatives for Maine's 2nd congressional district. She lost both elections to Republican Bruce Poliquin.

== Early life, education and career ==
Emily Cain was born in Louisville, Kentucky, but moved to the south side suburbs of Chicago, Illinois before the age of one. Her father, who has been working in the shoe business since he was 14 years old, ran stores for Florsheim Shoes and later worked for G.H. Bass & Co. in Maine. Her mother is a sign-language interpreter and educator. Cain lived in Illinois until age nine, and then moved to Lawrenceville, New Jersey, graduating from Lawrence High School and then moving to Maine with her family at the age of 18.

Cain attended the University of Maine and has lived in Orono since 1998. She received her Bachelor of Music Education in 2002, graduating with highest honors from the UMaine Honors College. In 2004, Cain graduated from Harvard University, receiving her Master of Education in Higher Education. She earned a Ph.D. in higher education from the University of Maine in 2025.

Cain worked at the University of Maine for more than a decade in the Honors College as the Coordinator of Advancement. After UMaine, she worked as a consultant for Jobs for Maine's Graduates, a private non-profit education and workforce training program.

After the 2016 elections, she became the chief strategy officer of HistoryIT, a Maine-based technology and services company focused on digital archives.

On June 15, 2017, Cain was hired as the executive director of EMILYs List, a national organization which works to support pro-choice Democratic women running for elected office. She departed the organization in 2023.

== Maine Legislature ==
=== Maine House of Representatives ===
Cain was elected to the Maine House of Representatives in 2004 at the age of 24 from an historically Democrat-leaning district, defeating Republican William Reed and Green Independent Mark Horton. She was reelected to a second term with 78% of the vote, defeating Republican Lance Cowan in 2006, and won a third term running unopposed in the general election in 2008. She won her fourth term to the house in 2010, defeating Republican Zachary David Jackman with 67% of the vote. In her final term in the Maine House, during the 125th legislature, Cain served as the Minority Leader from 2010 to 2012.

During her time in the House, Cain served on the Education and Cultural Affairs Committee and the Joint Rules Committee. She served as Chair of the Joint Select Committee on Research, Economic Development and the Innovation Economy in 2006, and also served as the chair of the Appropriations Subcommittee on School District Reorganization in 2007. From 2008 to 2010, Cain served as House Chair of the Joint Select Committee on Appropriations and Financial Affairs, leading tough negotiations to successfully pass five unanimous bipartisan budgets.

Cain was the first Democrat to serve as House Minority Leader since the mid-1970s. She held this position for one term and led Maine House Democrats back into the majority during the 2012 elections.

In 2009, Cain was one of over sixty co-sponsors in the House of LD 1020, legalizing same-sex marriage in Maine. At a house hearing in 2009, Cain said, "Equality was one of the main reasons why I ran for legislature. Marriage is not about gender and sexuality, it's about keeping Maine families together."

=== Maine Senate ===
In December 2011, Cain announced she would seek to replace fellow Democrat Elizabeth Schneider in the Maine Senate, running for Maine's 30th district. Schneider was unable to run due to term-limits, as Cain was also unable run for the House of Representatives again because of the same limits. She won in the Democratic primary, going on to defeat Republican Roderick Hathaway with 62% of the vote in the November general election. Cain served as a state delegate for Maine at the 2012 Democratic National Convention.

Cain served on the Senate Appropriations and Financial Affairs Committee, and was the Senate Chair of the Senate Government Oversight Committee.

In April 2013, Cain co-sponsored a Joint Amendment supporting comprehensive immigration reform that addresses "earned legalization with a path to citizenship, updated future immigration of families and workers and improved immigration enforcement and border security." Cain has also co-sponsored a Joint Amendment calling on Congress to support an amendment to the United States Constitution overturning the Supreme Court decision Citizens United v. Federal Election Commission, in order to "regulate the raising and spending of money in elections".

== Congressional campaigns ==
=== 2014 ===
Cain won the Democratic primary election for Maine's 2nd congressional district, beating State Senate Majority Leader Troy Jackson, with 79% of the vote to Jackson's 21%. She was defeated by former State Treasurer Bruce Poliquin in the general election. Poliquin won 47% of the vote, with Cain taking 42% and independent Blaine Richardson taking 11%. She received more votes in Hancock, Franklin and Waldo counties but Poliquin won the rest, including Penobscot County which Cain represented.

=== 2016 ===
Cain ran for U.S. Congress again in 2016, facing a rematch with now incumbent Republican Bruce Poliquin in the general election. Poliquin defeated Cain 55% to 45%.

== Personal life ==
Cain is married to Daniel B. Williams, who has served as the Executive Director of the Collins Center for the Arts at the University of Maine since 2014, and is a former member of the Maine House of Representatives. They reside in Orono, Maine.

Maine House of Representatives
Preceded by Joshua Tardy	Minority Leader of the Maine House of Representatives; 2010–2012	Succeeded by Kenneth Fredette
