= North Branch Meduxnekeag River =

Location
- Countries: United States, Canada

Physical characteristics
- Source
  - location: Maine
- Mouth
  - location: Meduxnekeag River
  - coordinates: 46°13′35″N 67°44′26″W
  - elevation: 300 feet (90 m)
- Length: about 25 miles (40 km)

Basin features
- Progression: Meduxnekeag — St. John — Bay of Fundy

The North Branch Meduxnekeag River is a river in Aroostook County, Maine and Carleton County, New Brunswick. From the outlet of a small pond (46°21′40″N 68°03′18″W) in Maine Township 8, Range 3, WELS, the river runs about 20 miles (30 km) northeast, south, and east to the Canada–United States border, crossing into Canada at 46°16′40″N 67°46′56″W. It runs about 4 miles (6 km) southeast to its confluence with the Meduxnekeag River in Wakefield, NB.

== See also ==
- List of rivers of Maine
- List of bodies of water of New Brunswick
