= Kennebunk High School =

Location
- 89 Fletcher Street; Kennebunk, York, Maine 04043; United States
- Coordinates: 43°23′47″N 70°32′57″W

Information
- School district: RSU 21
- Superintendent: Martin Grimm
- Principal: Scott Tombleson
- Teaching staff: 58.70 (FTE)
- Grades: 9–12
- Age: 13 to 19
- Student to teacher ratio: 11.64
- Colors: Blue and white
- Song: Our Director
- Sports: Football, skiing, baseball, soccer, volleyball, field hockey, cheerleading, cross country, basketball, wrestling, hockey, swimming, track and field, softball, golf, tennis, lacrosse
- Mascot: Bunky the Ram
- Team name: Rams
- Accreditation: New England Association of Schools and Colleges
- Newspaper: The Herd (theherdkhs.net)
- Yearbook: The Rambler
- Website: khs.rsu21.net

Kennebunk High School is a public high school located in Kennebunk, Maine, United States. It is part of Maine Regional School Unit 21 for the towns Arundel, Kennebunk and Kennebunkport. The school has approximately 760 students enrolled. In 1982–83 and in 1990–91, Kennebunk High School was named a National Blue Ribbon School. It is currently a First Amendment School.

Starting in the 2008–09 school year, Kennebunk High School became an International Baccalaureate school.

In 2013, Kennebunk High School ranked 4th in the United States by the Center for Digital Education "for its use of information technology to improve service delivery and quality of education." In 2015, Kennebunk High School rose to #1 in this position for schools with less than 3000 students.

Also in 2013, Kennebunk High School was recognized as one of only three schools in Maine to be honored by the College Board by making AP Honor Roll. This was because of "increasing access to Advanced Placement (AP) course work while simultaneously maintaining or increasing the percentage of students earning scores of 3 or higher on AP Exams."

== Facilities ==
The main building of Kennebunk High School, located on Fletcher Street, was built in 1938 to replace the previous building located on Park Street at the site of where Park Street School used to stand. In 1951, an addition was added to the right of the building which provided two wings, one to house the former Kennebunk Junior High School, and the other to house the High School gymnasium and technical education facilities. In the early 1970s, an addition to those wings was added to house the high school's musical and science programs. In 1981, all portions of the three-part 'wing' were incorporated into the Kennebunk Junior High School when a larger wing, built onto the left side of the main building on Memorial Field was added to replace the facilities in the older addition(s).

By the mid-1990s, all buildings were at capacity, and 15 portable classrooms were added to the high school campus. With the aid of state financing, in 2004 MSAD71 completed construction of a new middle school in West Kennebunk, upon completion of which the high school moved back into the wings it had previously occupied, eliminating the need for many of the portable classrooms.

The main building has been extensively remodeled throughout the years, most notably during the construction of the 1981 addition. Before 1981, the main building had two identical wings on both the left and right sides of the facade. The wing to the left, which housed the English department, was completely leveled to make room for the larger addition. Other 1981 changes to the main building include the replacement of the wooden staircases in favor of fire-retardant steel, the installation of lower 'hanging' ceilings and the placement of carpets over the tiled floors.

In 2018 the school completed another extensive renovation project, that cost $42.8 million to complete. The gymnasium was renovated and new support spaces were built. New science labs, new Industrial Arts classrooms, a new second gym, cafeteria, administrative offices, a new library, and a new two-story classroom wing were part of the additions and renovations.

Alexander Economos Auditorium
The main building houses the Alexander Economos Auditorium, named after a popular English and drama teacher whose tenure extended from the 1950s into the early 1980s. Though included in the remodeling of 1981, the auditorium still features the extensive original decorative tile work along the walls and surrounding the stage. Previous to its incarnation as an auditorium, the room had served as a gymnasium, cafeteria, library and a band room for the school. This is now a lecture hall.

== Renovation plan ==
On Tuesday, January 21, 2014, Kennebunk, Kennebunkport and Arundel voted to reject a proposed $75 million bond to renovate three schools. The process was covered on news channels across Maine. A new plan was voted on in June 2015, which passed.

== Academics ==
Advanced Placement
Kennebunk High School offers Advanced Placement courses following the College Board AP curriculum. Subjects include “Art, Computer Science, Biology, English Literature, English Language and Composition, Calculus (Levels AB and BC), U.S. History, European History, US Government, Comparative Governments, Chemistry, Statistics, and Physics C.”

International Baccalaureate
Kennebunk High School also offers courses within the International Baccalaureate curriculum, as set by the IB Organization. Students are able to obtain certificates and the full IB diploma following the completion of their high school career. Courses taught following the International Baccalaureate curriculum include History of the Americas HL, Visual Arts, Languages (Spanish SL, French SL, and English HL), Mathematics (SL and HL), Sciences (Environmental Science SL and Biology SL), and Music SL.

== Sports ==
Kennebunk has teams for the following sports:

- Football
- Skiing
- Baseball
- Soccer
- Volleyball
- Field hockey
- Cheerleading
- Cross country
- Basketball
- Wrestling
- Hockey
- Swimming
- Track and field
- Softball
- Golf
- Tennis
- Lacrosse

== Mascot ==
KHS's school mascot is a bipedal ram named Bunky.

== Music ==
Kennebunk High School has a large music program, with two choirs and two bands, as well as the "Kennefunk Jazz" club. The jazz band meets at nights for two hours once a week.

The music classes that are offered include, but are not limited to: IB Music Theory, guitar, steel pans, piano, wind ensemble, ukulele, concert band, chamber choir, and concert chorus. Wind ensemble and chamber choir are both classes that require an audition and are an honors level class. For concert band and chorus, no audition is required.

There is marching band that performs during homecoming parade, May Day parade, and the Memorial Day parades. They also do outside performances. The choir does caroling around the December holiday, during a local time of year called prelude, and does multiple different concerts throughout the school year.

== Notable faculty ==
- Thomas W. Murphy, Jr., chair of the Maine Republican Party
- Dave Cloutier, former football head coach from 1963 to 1964
- Joe Rafferty, Maine Democratic Senator, District 34
