= Danny Costain =

American politician

The Honorable

Member of the Maine House of Representatives from the 33rd district
- Incumbent
- Assumed office December 7, 2022
- Preceded by: Victoria Morales

Member of the Maine House of Representatives from the 100th district
- In office December 2018 – December 7, 2022
- Preceded by: Kenneth Fredette
- Succeeded by: Daniel Ankeles

Personal details
- Party: Republican
- Spouse: Lanci
- Children: 2

Danny Costain is an American politician who has served as a member of the Maine House of Representatives since December 2018.

== Electoral history ==
He was first elected to the 100th district in the 2018 Maine House of Representatives election. He was redirected 2020 Maine House of Representatives election. He was redistricted to the 33rd district in the 2022 Maine House of Representatives election.

== Biography ==
Costain graduated from Old Town High School in Old Town, Maine. He served in the United States Air Force and the Maine Air National Guard for eight years. Costain earned a degree from the Maine Criminal Justice Academy.
