= Matthew Harrington (politician) =

American politician

Member of the Maine Senate from the 33rd district
- Incumbent
- Assumed office December 7, 2022
- Preceded by: David Woodsome

Member of the Maine House of Representatives from the 19th district
- In office November 4, 2015 – December 7, 2022
- Preceded by: William Noon
- Succeeded by: Richard Campbell

Personal details
- Party: Republican
- Spouse: Lauren Harrington
- Education: Southern Maine Community College and University of Southern Maine
- Website: https://www.harringtonformaine.com

Matthew Harrington is an American politician and police officer from Sanford, Maine

== Early life and education ==
Harrington is a fourth-generation Mainer who lives in Sanford, Maine. He is a graduate of Southern Main Community College, and the University of Southern Maine. After college Harrington became a police officer, and he is currently serving as a patrol officer in the Kennebuck police department, with over 15 years of service under his belt.

== Political career ==
Harrington's political career started in 2014, when he was chosen to replace Sarah Cognata after she withdrew from the race for Maine's 19 house district. However, he was unable to win the seat.

In 2015, the 19th district held a special election after William Noon died. For this election the GOP selected Harrington to run. He won a tight race against Jean Noon, securing a slight victory of under 1%.

In 2016, he ran unopposed in the Republican primary, and went on to win the general election by 3%.

In 2018, he ran unopposed in the Republican primary, and went on to win the general election by over 10%.

In 2020, he ran for the Maine House of Representatives' 19th district one last time, winning the general election by over 10% again.

In 2022, Harrington ran for Maine Senate's 33rd district, and won by almost 10%.

== Electoral history ==
General election for Maine State Senate District 33, 2022
Party	Candidate	Votes	%
Republican	Matthew Harrington	8,509	54.1%
Democratic	Kendra Williams	7,228	45.9%

Republican Primary for Maine State Senate District 33, 2022
Party	Candidate	Votes	%
Republican	Matthew Harrington	1,263	100.0%

General election for Maine House of Representatives District 19, 2020
Party	Candidate	Votes	%
Republican	Matthew Harrington	2,626	57.2%
Democratic	Patricia Kidder	1,962	42.8%

Republican Primary for Maine House of Representatives District 19, 2020
Party	Candidate	Votes	%
Republican	Matthew Harrington	320	100.0%

General election for Maine House of Representatives District 19, 2018
Party	Candidate	Votes	%
Republican	Matthew Harrington	1,879	56.0%
Democratic	Jeremy Mele	1,477	44.0%

Republican Primary for Maine House of Representatives District 19, 2018
Party	Candidate	Votes	%
Republican	Matthew Harrington	9,734	100.0%

General election for Maine House of Representatives District 19, 2016
Party	Candidate	Votes	%
Republican	Matthew Harrington	2,288	51.22%
Democratic	Nalbert Tero	2,179	48.78%

Republican Primary for Maine House of Representatives District 19, 2016
Party	Candidate	Votes	%
Republican	Matthew Harrington	?	100.0%

Special election for Maine House of Representatives District 19, 2015
Party	Candidate	Votes	%
Republican	Matthew Harrington	767	46.7%
Democratic	Jean Noon	754	45.9%
Other	Victor DiGregorio	111	6.8%
Other	Blank	11	0.7%

General election for Maine House of Representatives District 19, 2014
Party	Candidate	Votes	%
Democratic	William Noon	1,698	49.2%
Republican	Matthew Harrington	1,556	45.1%
Other	Blank	195	5.7%
