= Henry L. Joy =

American politician (1933–2023)

Member of the Maine House of Representatives for the 9th District
- In office December 4, 2002 – December 2010
- Preceded by: Sally Landry

Personal details
- Born: November 26, 1933 Macwahoc, Maine, U.S.
- Died: March 29, 2023 (aged 89)
- Party: Republican
- Spouse: Mary Kennison Boutaugh Joy
- Education: Hillyer College, Ricker College, University of Maine
- Profession: Politician and teacher

Henry L. Joy (November 26, 1933 – March 29, 2023) was an American politician and teacher from Maine. Joy was a Republican from Crystal, Maine. He was first elected to the Maine House of Representatives in 1992, which was the 116th Legislature, and served in every consecutive legislature except for the 120th Legislature, when he made an unsuccessful bid for governor of Maine, after which he served as a Selectman for the town of Crystal, and was returned to the 121st Legislature in 2002, re-elected in 2004 and 2006.

In October 1997, Joy announced that he would seek the Maine Republican Party's nomination for governor in 1998. In the June 1998 primary, he finished in second place of three candidates, behind James B. Longley, Jr.

Joy's House District included Bancroft, Crystal, Dyer Brook, Haynesville, Hersey, Island Falls, Linneus, Ludlow, Merrill, Mount Chase, New Limerick, Oakfield, Patten, Sherman, Smyrna, Stacyville, Weston and Plantations of Glenwood, Macwahoc, Moro and Reed, plus the unorganized territories of North Penobscot (part, including Herseytown Township) and South Aroostook (including Benedicta, Molunkus and Silver Ridge Townships).

Joy attended Hillyer College, in Hartford Connecticut, from 1951 to 1953, and received a Bachelor of Science degree from Ricker College in 1963, and a master's degree in education from the University of Maine, at Orono in 1976.

Joy was an educator in Island Falls, Maine from 1963 to 1969 and from 1972 to 1974, Superintendent of Schools, CSD #9, 1976–1981, and a teacher with Maine Administrative School Administrative District #25 (MSAD #25), from 1981 to 1992, after which he retired from teaching.

Joy died in a nursing home on March 29, 2023, at the age of 89.

Maine House of Representatives
| Preceded by Rodney V. Bowers | Member of the Maine House of Representatives from the 140th district 1992–1994 | Succeeded by Herbert E. Clark |
| Preceded by Dean Clukey | Member of the Maine House of Representatives from the 141st district 1994–2000 | Succeeded by Sally Landry |
| Preceded by Sally Landry | Member of the Maine House of Representatives from the 141st district 2002–2004 | Succeeded by Christopher Babbidge |
| Preceded by David Bowles | Member of the Maine House of Representatives from the 9th district 2004–2010 | Succeeded by Ricky Long |
