= Robert Foley (American politician) =

American politician

Member of the Maine House of Representatives from the 145th district
- Incumbent
- Assumed office December 4, 2024
- Preceded by: Daniel Hobbs

Member of the Maine Senate from the 34th district
- In office December 5, 2018 – December 2, 2020
- Preceded by: Ronald F. Collins
- Succeeded by: Joe Rafferty

Member of the Maine House of Representatives from the 7th district
- In office December 3, 2014 – December 5, 2018
- Preceded by: Alexander Willette
- Succeeded by: Daniel Hobbs

Personal details
- Born: 1953 (age 72–73)
- Party: Republican
- Spouse: Maryanne
- Children: 2
- Education: University of Southern Maine

Robert Foley (born 1953) is an American politician from the U.S. State of Maine. Foley is a Republican State Senator from the 34th Senate District, representing the towns of Acton, Kennebunk, Lebanon, North Berwick, Wells, and part of Berwick. He replaced Ronald Collins, who could not run for another term due to term limits

Before being elected to the Maine Legislature, Foley served as a Selectman for Wells. Foley currently resides there with his wife, Maryanne, and two children. He is still currently a employed in the insurance sector as a Certified Insurance Counselor.

Foley served in the Maine House of Representatives representing District 7 from 2014 until 2018. While in the House, he served on the Insurance and Financial Affairs Committee.

In the Senate, Foley serves on the Environment and Natural Resources Committee and the Health Coverage, Insurance and Financial Services Committee.

In April 2024, Foley announced he was running for the Maine House of Representatives in the 145th district for the 2024 elections. He was elected in November 2024.

Maine House of Representatives
Preceded by Alexander Willette	Member of the Maine House of Representatives from the 7th district 2014–2018	Succeeded by Daniel Hobbs
Preceded by Daniel Hobbs	Member of the Maine House of Representatives from the 145th district 2024–present	Incumbent
Maine Senate
Preceded by Ronald F. Collins	Member of the Maine Senate from the 34th district 2018–2020	Succeeded by Joe Rafferty
