= Ricker College =

College in Houlton, Maine, US (1848–1978)

Coordinates: 46°07′25″N 67°50′07″W

Ricker College was a small college located in Houlton, Maine, United States. It opened in 1848 (178 years ago) and closed in 1978 (48 years ago).

It began as Houlton Academy in 1848, before being subsequently renamed Ricker Classical Institute in 1887. It became Ricker Junior College in 1934 and operated as a four-year liberal arts college between that point and its closing in 1978. It did continue to operate as a secondary school through 1967.

The name "Ricker" was taken from Doctor Joseph Ricker, who was at the time the State Secretary of the Maine Baptist Convention.

As with many other small, private colleges in the US, Ricker College faced financial difficulties in the 1970s and was forced to close its Houlton campus in May 1978. Other off-campus programs in continuing education remained operational after the main campus's closing, but not at the collegiate level.

A branch of the University of Maine system, the University of Maine at Presque Isle Outreach at Houlton, holds classes in a newly renovated building on Military Street.

== Notable alumni ==
- Bob Davoli, venture capitalist
- Paul Duffie, Canadian politician
- Ira G. Hersey, politician
- Henry L. Joy, politician
- David Parks, photographer
- Steve Shea, professional baseball player; pitcher with the Chicago Cubs, Houston Astros, and Montreal Expos
- Roger Sherman, politician
- Daniel Wathen, Chief Justice of the Maine Supreme Judicial Court
- Charles P. Pray, politician

== Greek life ==
=== Fraternities ===
- Pi Lambda Phi, ME Kappa Beta
- Tau Epsilon Phi, Phi Delta Upsilon
