= Sebasticook Valley Federal Credit Union =

Credit union based in Pittsfield, Maine

Sebasticook Valley Federal Credit Union (Sebasticook Valley FCU) is a credit union based in Pittsfield, Maine. The credit union provides loans, savings accounts, credit and debit cards, and other services. Sebasticook Valley FCU has locations in Pittsfield and Newport, Maine.

== Leadership ==
Jim Lemieux is the president and CEO of Sebasticook Valley FCU. In 2024, Lemieux received the Delmar Doody Award for his contributions to Maine businesses.

== Activities ==
Sebasticook Valley FCU is a member of the Maine Credit Union League. The credit union hosts “Financial Fitness Fairs” on behalf of the trade association, helping students with personal finance and financial literacy.

As of February 2025, Sebasticook Valley FCU has raised nearly $450,000 for the Maine Credit Union League’s Campaign for Ending Hunger since it began its support of the campaign, which addresses food insecurity in the state. The credit union also awards college scholarships to Maine high school students and participates in the Sebasticook Valley region’s Valley of Trees Festival annually in December.
