= William Noon =

American politician

Member of the Maine House of Representatives from the 19th district
- In office 2014–2015
- Succeeded by: Matthew Harrington

Member of the Maine House of Representatives from the 144th district
- In office 2012–2014
- Preceded by: Joan Nass

Personal details
- Died: July 15, 2015
- Party: Democratic
- Spouse: Jean Noon

William Noon (died July 15, 2015) was an American politician and sheep farmer from Sanford, Maine.

== Personal life ==
Over his lifetime Noon was a business owner, a carpenter, and a farmer. With his wife Jean he ran the Noon Family Sheep Farm in Springvale, Maine. He also owned a construction company named Noon Construction - Home and Barn Renovations. He also served on the Sanford Planning Board for over two decades, and was a chairman for 8.

== Political career ==
Noon's political career started in 2012 when he was selected to run for house district 144 of the Maine House of Representatives for the Democratic Party after Rosemary Guptill withdrew from the race. He won a tight race by only 20 votes or 0.4%. The race was close enough to trigger a recount

In 2014 he would run in the 19th district beating future four term representative Matthew Harrington by 4%.

== Death ==
In January 2014 Noon was diagnosed with a rare type of lymphoma. After a year long fight with cancer Noon died on July 15, 2015.

== Electoral history ==
General election for Maine House of Representatives District 19, 2014
Party	Candidate	Votes	%
Democratic	William Noon	1,698	49.2%
Republican	Matthew Harrington	1,556	45.1%
Other	Blank	195	5.7%

Democratic Primary for Maine House of Representatives District 19, 2014
Party	Candidate	Votes	%
Democratic	William Noon	?	100.0%

General election for Maine House of Representatives District 144, 2012
Party	Candidate	Votes	%
Democratic	William Noon	2,374	50.2%
Republican	Daniel Archambault	2,351	49.8%
