= Ronald F. Collins =

American politician

Member of the Maine Senate from the 2nd district
- In office 2010–2018
- Preceded by: Richard Nass
- Succeeded by: Robert Foley

Member of the Maine House of Representatives
- In office 2002–2010

Personal details
- Party: Republican
- Spouse: Linda Collins
- Profession: Businessperson
- Website: https://collinsformaine.com/

Ronald F. Collins is an American politician from Maine. A Wells resident, Collins formerly represented the second district in the Maine Senate. Prior to being elected a state senator, he was a member of the Maine House of Representatives representing Wells from 1998 to 2006.

Collins endorsed Mitt Romney for president in the 2012 election.

Maine House of Representatives
Preceded by Joseph G. J. Carleton	Member of the Maine House of Representatives from the 7th district 1998–2004	Succeeded by John W. Churchill
Preceded by Philip R. Bennett, Jr.	Member of the Maine House of Representatives from the 147th district 2004–2006	Succeeded by Kathleen Chase
Maine Senate
Preceded by Richard Nass	Member of the Maine Senate from the 2nd district 2010–2014	Succeeded by Michael Willette
Preceded by Roger Sherman	Member of the Maine Senate from the 34th district 2014–2018	Succeeded by Robert Foley
