= David Bowles (American politician) =

American politician

David E. Bowles (born August 30, 1944) is an American politician from Maine. Bowles, a Republican from Sanford, served four terms (1998–2006) in the Maine House of Representatives. He served two of those terms in leadership as Assistant Minority Leader (2003–2004) and as Minority Leader (2005–2006).

Bowles was born in Rochester, New York and settled in Sanford, Maine. He attended Washington and Lee University for one year and the University of Southern Maine for five years. He also served in the United States Marine Corps from 1964 to 1968.

Maine House of Representatives
| Preceded by Norman R. Paul | Member of the Maine House of Representatives from the 9th district 1998–2004 | Succeeded by Henry L. Joy |
| Preceded by Roger Sherman | Member of the Maine House of Representatives from the 142nd district 2004–2006 | Succeeded by Andrea M. Boland |
| Preceded by William Schneider | Assistant Minority Leader of the Maine House of Representatives; 2002–2004 | Succeeded by Joshua Tardy |
| Preceded by Joseph Bruno | Minority Leader of the Maine House of Representatives; 2004–2006 | Succeeded by Joshua Tardy |
