= Thomas W. Murphy Jr. =

Thomas W. Murphy Jr. (born October 29, 1942) is an American schoolteacher, newspaper publisher and politician from Maine. Murphy, a Republican, served eight terms (1981-1988; 1997-2004) in the Maine House of Representatives. During his time in the House, he was chosen minority leader of the Republican caucus on three separate occasions (1985-1988; 1999-2000). He also served as chair of the Maine Republican Party for 1988–1989.

Murphy was born on October 29, 1942, in New Haven, Connecticut. He served in the United States Marine Corps Reserves from 1960 to 1966 and graduated from the University of Nebraska in 1967 with a B.S. in education. He moved to Maine and became a resident of Kennebunk, Maine, which he would later represent in office. He began teaching at Kennebunk High School in that same year. He taught at KHS from 1967 to 1980 and again from 1988 to 1996. In 1980, Murphy became the editor and publisher of The Tourist News, a local newspaper aimed at the tourist population of southern Maine.
