= Linneus, Maine =

Town in Maine, United States

- Town
- Location of Linneus, Maine
- Coordinates: 46°01′11″N 67°59′08″W
- Country: United States
- State: Maine
- County: Aroostook

Area
  - Total: 45.47 sq mi (117.77 km^{2})
  - Land: 44.26 sq mi (114.63 km^{2})
  - Water: 1.21 sq mi (3.13 km^{2})
- Elevation: 577 ft (176 m)

Population (2020)
  - Total: 947
  - Density: 21/sq mi (8.3/km^{2})
- Time zone: UTC-5 (Eastern (EST))
  - Summer (DST): UTC-4 (EDT)
- ZIP code: 04730
- Area code: 207
- FIPS code: 23-39965
- GNIS feature ID: 582562

Linneus is a town in Aroostook County, Maine, United States. The population was 947 at the 2020 census. It is named after Carl Linnaeus.

== Geography ==
According to the United States Census Bureau, the town has a total area of 45.47 square miles (117.77 km^{2}), of which 44.26 square miles (114.63 km^{2}) is land and 1.21 square miles (3.13 km^{2}) is water.

== Founding ==
Half the township of Linneus was sold by the State of Massachusetts in 1833 in order to raise money to endow a Botany professorship at Harvard College.

== Demographics ==
Historical population
Census	Pop.	Note	%±
1840	311		—
1850	561		80.4%
1860	785		39.9%
1870	1,008		28.4%
1880	917		−9.0%
1890	965		5.2%
1900	834		−13.6%
1910	809		−3.0%
1920	706		−12.7%
1930	753		6.7%
1940	755		0.3%
1950	777		2.9%
1960	607		−21.9%
1970	608		0.2%
1980	752		23.7%
1990	810		7.7%
2000	892		10.1%
2010	984		10.3%
2020	947		−3.8%
U.S. Decennial Census

=== 2010 census ===
As of the census of 2010, there were 984 people, 382 households, and 272 families living in the town. The population density was 22.2 inhabitants per square mile (8.6/km^{2}). There were 588 housing units at an average density of 13.3 per square mile (5.1/km^{2}). The racial makeup of the town was 96.6% White, 0.8% African American, 1.8% Native American, 0.1% Asian, and 0.6% from two or more races. Hispanic or Latino of any race were 0.4% of the population.

There were 382 households, of which 28.5% had children under the age of 18 living with them, 59.4% were married couples living together, 8.4% had a female householder with no husband present, 3.4% had a male householder with no wife present, and 28.8% were non-families. 19.9% of all households were made up of individuals, and 7.1% had someone living alone who was 65 years of age or older. The average household size was 2.55 and the average family size was 2.95.

The median age in the town was 42.7 years. 21.1% of residents were under the age of 18; 8% were between the ages of 18 and 24; 25.4% were from 25 to 44; 33.2% were from 45 to 64; and 12.2% were 65 years of age or older. The gender makeup of the town was 52.2% male and 47.8% female.

=== 2000 census ===
As of the census of 2000, there were 892 people, 319 households, and 243 families living in the town. The population density was 20.0 inhabitants per square mile (7.7/km^{2}). There were 473 housing units at an average density of 10.6 per square mile (4.1/km^{2}). The racial makeup of the town was 95.40% White, 0.11% African American, 2.58% Native American, 0.11% Asian, 0.45% from other races, and 1.35% from two or more races. Hispanic or Latino of any race were 0.67% of the population.

There were 319 households, out of which 41.1% had children under the age of 18 living with them, 65.5% were married couples living together, 7.2% had a female householder with no husband present, and 23.8% were non-families. 16.9% of all households were made up of individuals, and 8.2% had someone living alone who was 65 years of age or older. The average household size was 2.74 and the average family size was 3.12.

In the town, the population was spread out, with 27.7% under the age of 18, 9.5% from 18 to 24, 27.4% from 25 to 44, 25.7% from 45 to 64, and 9.8% who were 65 years of age or older. The median age was 36 years. For every 100 females, there were 95.6 males. For every 100 females age 18 and over, there were 97.2 males.

The median income for a household in the town was $29,808, and the median income for a family was $35,625. Males had a median income of $30,208 versus $16,389 for females. The per capita income for the town was $12,535. About 14.3% of families and 17.5% of the population were below the poverty line, including 14.2% of those under age 18 and 18.2% of those age 65 or over.
