= Houlton, Maine =

Houlton
- Town
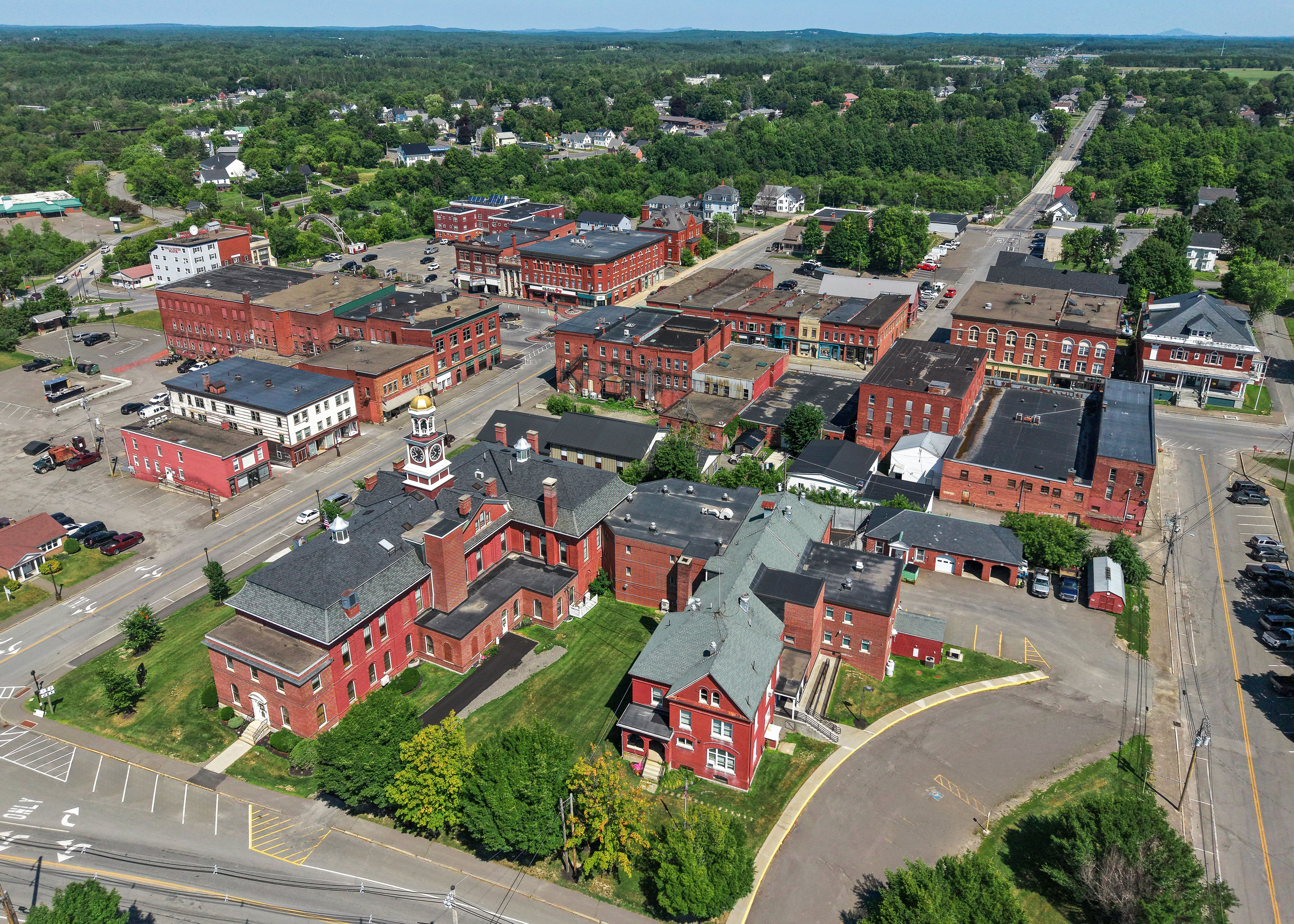
- Downtown (2026)

- Seal
- Nickname: Capital of Aroostook
- Motto(s): Valuing the past, planning for the future Worth a visit, worth a lifetime
- Location of Houlton, Maine

- Location within Maine Location within the United States
- Coordinates: 46°08′20″N 67°51′20″W
- Country: United States
- State: Maine
- County: Aroostook
- Settled: 1807
- Incorporated: March 8, 1831
- Villages: Houlton; Carys Mills

Area
  - Total: 36.73 sq mi (95.13 km^{2})
  - Land: 36.71 sq mi (95.08 km^{2})
  - Water: 0.019 sq mi (0.05 km^{2})
- Elevation: 400 ft (120 m)

Population (2020)
  - Total: 6,055
  - Density: 165/sq mi (63.7/km^{2})
- Time zone: UTC-05:00 (EST)
  - Summer (DST): UTC-04:00 (EDT)
- ZIP Codes: 04730, 04761
- Area code: 207
- FIPS code: 23-33980
- GNIS feature ID: 582525
- Website: www.houlton-maine.com

Houlton is a town in and the county seat of Aroostook County, Maine, United States, on the Canada–United States border. As of the 2020 census, the town's population was 6,055. It is perhaps best known for being at the northern terminus of Interstate 95 and as the birthplace of Samantha Smith, a goodwill ambassador as a child during the Cold War. The town hosts the annual Houlton Agricultural Fair.

Its nickname is the "Shire Town". The Houlton High School sports teams are named "The Shiretowners". The Meduxnekeag River flows through the heart of the town, and the border with the Canadian province of New Brunswick is 3 mi (4.8 km) east of the town's center. Houlton was the home of Ricker College, which closed in 1978.

The primary settlement and center of the town is designated as a CDP with the same name. The headquarters of the federally recognized Houlton Band of Maliseet Indians is based here.

== History ==
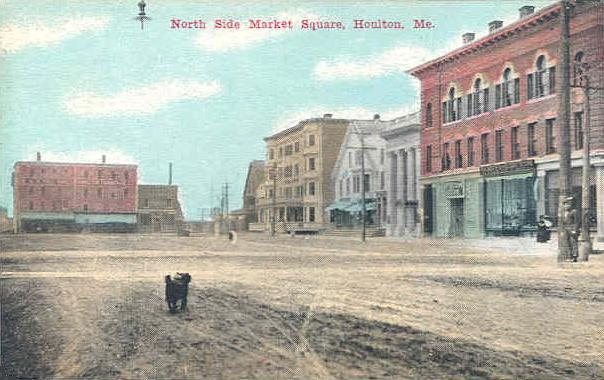
Market Square in 1911

The area was occupied for thousands of years by varying cultures of indigenous peoples. In historic times, these were the Algonquian-speaking Wolastoqiyik. When Maine was part of Massachusetts, parcels of land were dealt out to schools and colleges. The area that was to become Houlton was deeded to the Academy of New Salem, Massachusetts. Thirteen men from New Salem bought the land from the academy, though only three settled there.

Decades after the American Revolutionary War, Anglo-American pioneers Aaron Putnam and Joseph Houlton started a village. They named it for Houlton, who had moved to Maine in 1807 from the more populated part of Massachusetts. Maine separated from Massachusetts in 1820 and became an independent state.

In 1828 the United States government established Hancock Barracks, a military post, in the area. Houlton was officially incorporated as a town in 1831. When the Aroostook War flared in 1839 over the border with Canada, three companies of the 1st Artillery Regiment manned Hancock Barracks under Major R. M. Kirby. Major Kirby helped to restrain the twelve companies of militia that Maine sent there from starting a shooting war. The Webster-Ashburton Treaty settled the boundary dispute in 1842, and the Army abandoned Hancock Barracks in 1847.

The U.S. Army installed its first transatlantic radio intelligence station 1.5 miles east of the town center of Houlton, Maine, during World War I. The Houlton Radio Intelligence Station intercepted German diplomatic communications, primarily from its Nauen Transmitter Station. MI-8 created the Radio Intelligence Service, using selected Signal Corps personnel for the sole purpose of supporting strategic intelligence through radio intercepts during World War I. The United States intelligence services built Houlton as the first unit of its type, and its success helped to lay the foundation for many more United States long-range radio-intercept stations.

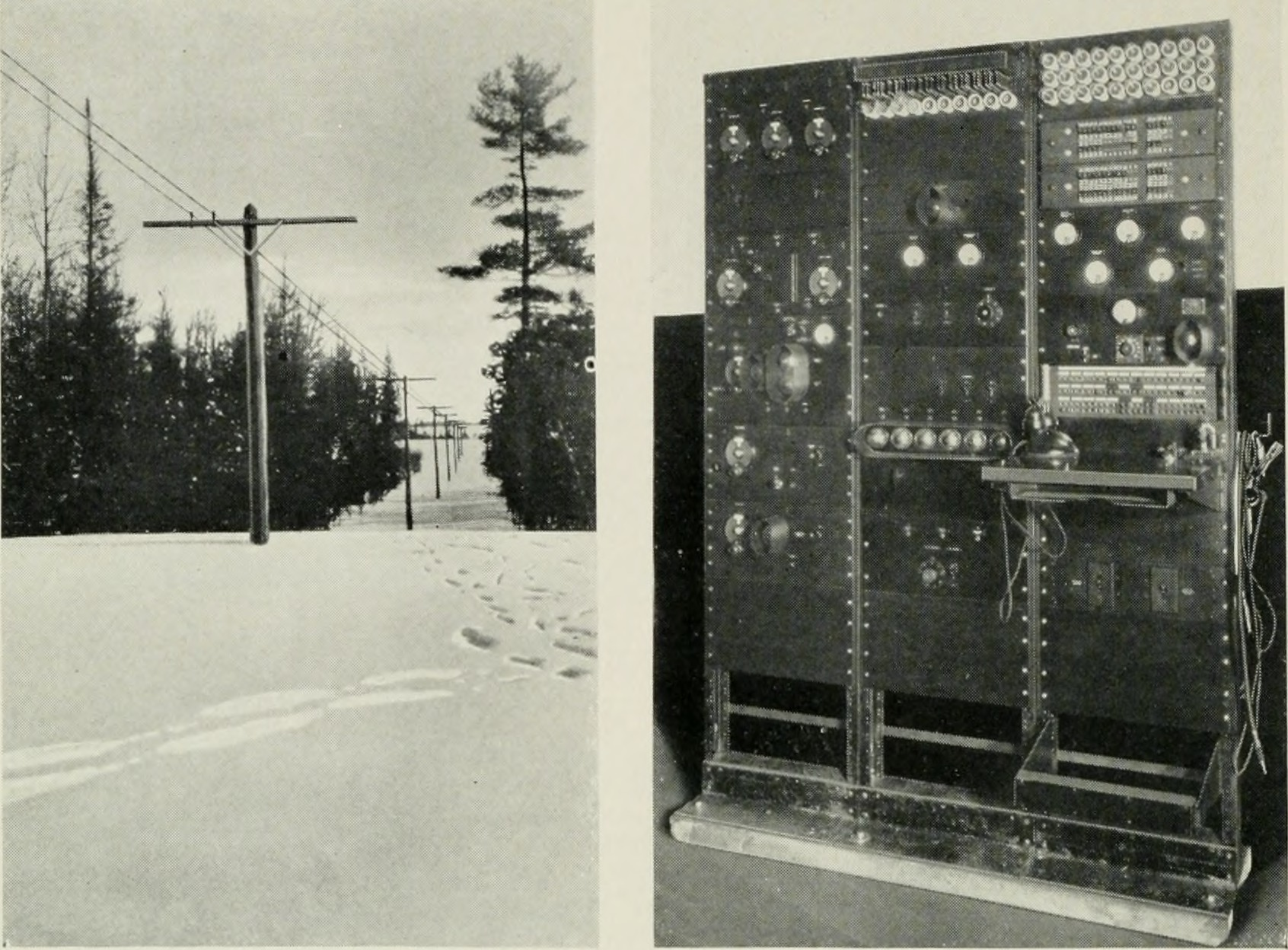
The AT&T receiving beverage antenna (left) and radio receiver (right) at Houlton, from a 1920s magazine

On January 7, 1927, AT&T initiated the first transatlantic commercial telephone service, linking New York and London. The AT&T Transoceanic Receiver Station was located at the end of Hand Lane, 46.1270°N 67.8841°W, two miles west of the town center. The massive receiving beverage antenna, over three miles long and two miles wide, straddled what is now Interstate 95 in Maine four miles west of the center of Houlton. The receiver station worked with the large long-wave transmitting facility of AT&T located at RCA in Rocky Point, New York. The receiver station received the longwave telephone signal from the British General Post Office Rugby transmitting station near Rugby, England. The Rugby Radio Station ceased operations in 2007. On its site is a new large-scale housing development, which has also been named Houlton, in honour of the historic links with its American namesake.

The US Army established Houlton Army Air Base in 1941 immediately adjacent to the Canada–US border. Prior to the United States' entry into World War II, American army pilots flew planes to the base. They could not fly the planes directly into Canada, a member of the British Commonwealth, because that would violate the official United States position of neutrality. Local farmers used their tractors to tow the planes into Canada, where the Canadians closed the Woodstock highway so that aircraft could use it as a runway.

A Royal New Zealand Air Force pilot, officer George Newall Harrison, died on December 5, 1942, when he crashed 500 yards south of the runway while ferrying a Hudson Bomber to Britain. Survivors buried his body in the Evergreen Cemetery plot for veterans. Few other New Zealand casualties from World War II were buried in the United States of America. His 19-year-old radio operator, Sergeant Henry Bordewick, also died and was buried there; he was from Vancouver, British Columbia, Canada. The American Legion post in Houlton maintains both these Commonwealth war graves.

The Houlton Army Air Base closed in July 1944. In 1944, the Army adapted a major part of the Houlton Army Air Base for use as prisoner of war internment in Camp Houlton. At its peak, the internment camp held 3,700 German prisoners of war. Forcing prisoners of war to work violated the Geneva Convention; however, they could volunteer to work. Camp Houlton provided laborers for local farms to harvest peas, pick potatoes, and do other labor. For security reasons, the government did not allow every prisoner of war to work on the farms. Most prisoners selected to work did not want to harm their captors or cause trouble. Many farmers came to consider the prisoners of war who worked their fields as good laborers rather than enemy soldiers. They paid the prisoners $1/day in scrip, which the prisoners could spend at the post exchange, the base store, to buy toiletries, tobacco, chocolate, or beer. After the prisoners repatriated, the Army closed Camp Houlton in 1946. The site was redeveloped as Houlton International Airport.

Houlton was the easternmost point of totality in the United States during the solar eclipse of April 8, 2024. The town spent two years preparing a three-day festival leading up to the event. Due to poor weather in much of the country, turnout was greater than expected. Attendance was estimated at 20,000 people or more, over three times the town's population. A large banner was unveiled, celebrating Houlton as the "Great American Eclipse's final destination" proclaiming, "The End is Here." The town's masonic bust of George Washington was outfitted with a pair of oversized eclipse glasses. After the eclipse, the thousands of visitors left the town, resulting in a miles-long traffic jam on Route 1 South.

== Geography and climate ==
According to the United States Census Bureau, the town has a total area of 36.73 square miles (95.13 km^{2}), of which 36.71 square miles (95.08 km^{2}) is land and 0.02 square miles (0.05 km^{2}) is water. Houlton is drained by the Meduxnekeag River.

Interstate 95 has its northernmost two exits in Houlton. The Houlton/Woodstock Border Crossing, located to the east of downtown Houlton, marks the northern terminus of Interstate 95. The town is also crossed by U.S. Route 1 and U.S. Route 2, which have a brief concurrency in the center of town.

Typically for Maine, Houlton has a humid continental climate (Köppen Dfb) with warm summers and cold, snowy winters comparable to Fargo. The coldest month between 1971 and 2000 was January 1994 with a mean temperature of 0.7 °F or −17.4 °C, though data from nearby stations suggest the Januaries of 1920 and 1925 were equally cold. Snow depth typically reaches 14 inches or 0.36 metres in February, and has been as high as 71 inches or 1.80 metres at the close of January 1998. Temperature extremes range from −41 °F (−41 °C) on January 4, 1981, up to 99 °F (37 °C) on August 2, 1975.

Climate data for Houlton, Maine (Houlton International Airport) 1991–2020 normals, extremes 1948–present
Month	Jan	Feb	Mar	Apr	May	Jun	Jul	Aug	Sep	Oct	Nov	Dec	Year
Record high °F (°C)	58 (14)	62 (17)	79 (26)	86 (30)	96 (36)	97 (36)	97 (36)	99 (37)	93 (34)	84 (29)	73 (23)	60 (16)	99 (37)
Mean maximum °F (°C)	46.1 (7.8)	44.5 (6.9)	53.6 (12.0)	70.4 (21.3)	82.6 (28.1)	87.5 (30.8)	89.4 (31.9)	88.5 (31.4)	83.2 (28.4)	72.3 (22.4)	61.1 (16.2)	49.9 (9.9)	91.6 (33.1)
Mean daily maximum °F (°C)	23.2 (−4.9)	26.3 (−3.2)	36.0 (2.2)	49.3 (9.6)	63.6 (17.6)	72.5 (22.5)	78.1 (25.6)	76.7 (24.8)	68.3 (20.2)	54.5 (12.5)	41.3 (5.2)	29.6 (−1.3)	51.6 (10.9)
Daily mean °F (°C)	12.9 (−10.6)	14.8 (−9.6)	25.5 (−3.6)	38.6 (3.7)	51.2 (10.7)	60.2 (15.7)	66.1 (18.9)	64.4 (18.0)	56.2 (13.4)	44.3 (6.8)	33.1 (0.6)	20.9 (−6.2)	40.7 (4.8)
Mean daily minimum °F (°C)	2.6 (−16.3)	3.2 (−16.0)	15.0 (−9.4)	27.9 (−2.3)	38.9 (3.8)	48.0 (8.9)	54.1 (12.3)	52.1 (11.2)	44.0 (6.7)	34.0 (1.1)	24.8 (−4.0)	12.2 (−11.0)	29.7 (−1.3)
Mean minimum °F (°C)	−22.5 (−30.3)	−20.8 (−29.3)	−11.7 (−24.3)	12.3 (−10.9)	25.5 (−3.6)	33.0 (0.6)	41.1 (5.1)	38.1 (3.4)	27.7 (−2.4)	19.1 (−7.2)	5.1 (−14.9)	−12.2 (−24.6)	−25.2 (−31.8)
Record low °F (°C)	−41 (−41)	−36 (−38)	−31 (−35)	−13 (−25)	18 (−8)	26 (−3)	32 (0)	30 (−1)	20 (−7)	10 (−12)	−14 (−26)	−34 (−37)	−41 (−41)
Average precipitation inches (mm)	2.65 (67)	1.95 (50)	2.67 (68)	2.94 (75)	3.46 (88)	4.04 (103)	3.63 (92)	3.52 (89)	3.40 (86)	4.04 (103)	3.61 (92)	3.37 (86)	39.28 (998)
Average snowfall inches (cm)	22.8 (58)	20.9 (53)	19.0 (48)	6.3 (16)	0.1 (0.25)	0.0 (0.0)	0.0 (0.0)	0.0 (0.0)	0.0 (0.0)	0.7 (1.8)	6.5 (17)	19.6 (50)	95.9 (244)
Average precipitation days (≥ 0.01 in)	11.4	9.8	11.0	12.2	13.4	13.7	13.0	11.8	10.7	12.6	11.7	12.6	143.9
Average snowy days (≥ 0.1 in)	11.9	10.7	8.6	3.7	0.1	0.0	0.0	0.0	0.0	0.8	4.5	10.4	50.7
Average relative humidity (%)	91	91	91	83	76	78	78	79	80	82	83	88	83
Mean daily sunshine hours	3.2	2.6	3.8	5.8	7.4	8.1	9.3	9.6	7.4	5.8	4.2	3.5	5.9
Mean daily daylight hours	9.1	10.4	12.0	13.6	15.0	15.7	15.3	14.1	12.5	10.9	9.4	8.7	12.2
Average ultraviolet index	1	1	1	3	4	5	5	4	3	2	1	1	3
Source 1: NOAA (snow recorded at Houlton 5N weather station)
Source 2: Weather Atlas (UV and humidity)

== Demographics ==
Historical population
Census	Pop.	Note	%±
1820	115		—
1830	579		403.5%
1840	1,597		175.8%
1850	1,453		−9.0%
1860	2,035		40.1%
1870	2,850		40.0%
1880	3,228		13.3%
1890	4,015		24.4%
1900	4,686		16.7%
1910	5,845		24.7%
1920	6,191		5.9%
1930	6,865		10.9%
1940	7,771		13.2%
1950	8,377		7.8%
1960	8,289		−1.1%
1970	8,111		−2.1%
1980	6,766		−16.6%
1990	6,613		−2.3%
2000	6,476		−2.1%
2010	6,123		−5.5%
2020	6,055		−1.1%

=== 2010 census ===
As of the census of 2010, there were 6,123 people, 2,556 households, and 1,563 families residing in the town. The population density was 166.8 inhabitants per square mile (64.4/km^{2}). There were 2,822 housing units at an average density of 76.9 per square mile (29.7/km^{2}). The racial makeup of the town was 91.0% White, 0.7% African American, 5.8% Native American, 0.5% Asian, 0.4% from other races, and 1.7% from two or more races. Hispanic or Latino of any race were 1.1% of the population.

There were 2,556 households, of which 30.2% had children under the age of 18 living with them, 43.2% were married couples living together, 13.5% had a female householder with no husband present, 4.5% had a male householder with no wife present, and 38.8% were non-families. Of all households, 33.9% were made up of individuals, and 17.1% had someone living alone who was 65 years of age or older. The average household size was 2.27 and the average family size was 2.87.

The median age in the town was 43.2 years. 22.4% of residents were under the age of 18; 7.2% were between the ages of 18 and 24; 22.9% were from 25 to 44; 27.6% were from 45 to 64; and 19.8% were 65 years of age or older. The gender makeup of the town was 46.4% male and 53.6% female.

=== 2000 census ===
As of the census of 2000, there were 6,476 people, 2,677 households, and 1,654 families residing in the town. The population density was 176.2 inhabitants per square mile (68.0/km^{2}). There were 2,994 housing units at an average density of 31.5 persons/km^{2} (81.5 persons/sq mi). The racial makeup of the town was 94.19% White, 0.29% African American, 4.23% Native American, 0.48% Asian, 0.08% Pacific Islander, 0.09% from other races, and 0.63% from two or more races. 0.43% of the population were Hispanic or Latino of any race.

There were 1,677 households, out of which 29.5% had children under the age of 18 living with them, 47.4% were married couples living together, 11.0% have a woman whose husband does not live with her, and 38.2% were non-families. Of all households, 34.3% were made up of individuals, and 18.0% had someone living alone who was 65 years of age or older. The average household size was 2.29 and the average family size was 2.94.

In the town, the population was spread out, with 23.7% under the age of 18, 7.1% from 18 to 24, 26.0% from 25 to 44, 21.9% from 45 to 64, and 21.3% who were 65 years of age or older. The median age was 40 years. For every 100 females, there were 87.5 males. For every 100 females age 18 and over, there were 82.4 males.

The median income for a household in the town was $26,212, and the median income for a family was $34,812. Males had a median income of $27,623 versus $20,991 for females. The per capita income for the town was $14,007. 17.7% of the population and 13.5% of families were below the poverty line. Out of the total people living in poverty, 21.0% are under the age of 18 and 15.8% are 65 or older.

== Education ==
Houlton High School is the public high school, as well as there being a public elementary school. Greater Houlton Christian Academy is a private school in Houlton.

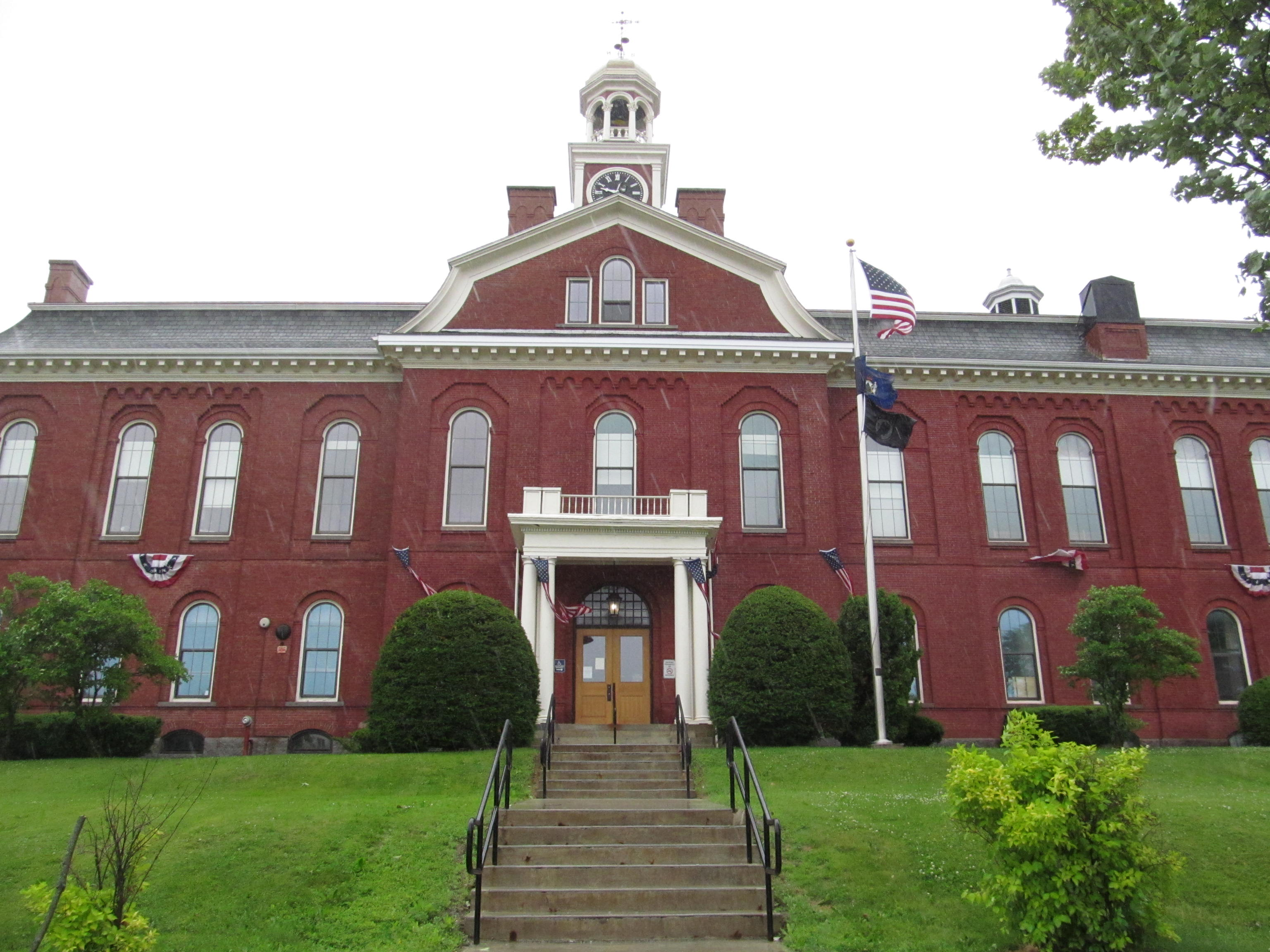
Aroostook County Courthouse and Jail

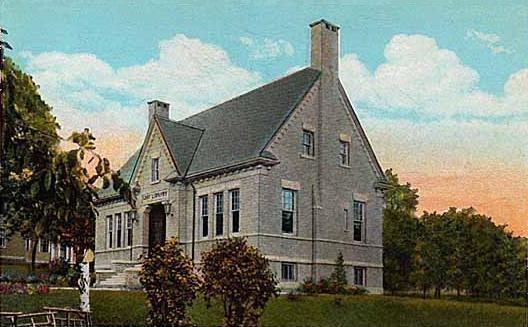
Cary Library, a Carnegie library designed by John Calvin Stevens

== Sites of interest ==
- Amazeen House, built in 1882 and listed on the National Register of Historic Places
- Aroostook County Courthouse and Jail
- Aroostook County Historical & Art Museum
- Blackhawk Putnam Tavern
- Cary Library
- Edward L. Cleveland House
- Houlton International Airport
- Market Square Historic District
- Unitarian Church of Houlton
- Walter P. Mansur House

== Notable people ==
- Charles P. Barnes, 17th Chief Justice of the Maine Supreme Judicial Court and 67th Speaker of the Maine House of Representatives
- Ralph Botting, pitcher for the California Angels
- Michael E. Carpenter, Maine Attorney General and state legislator
- Shepard Cary, US congressman
- Marcus Davis, mixed martial arts fighter with the Ultimate Fighting Championship
- William Dufris, original voice of Bob the Builder in North America
- Ira G. Hersey, US congressman
- Stan Hindman, defensive lineman for the San Francisco 49ers
- DebraLee Hovey, Connecticut State Representative
- Jean E. Howard, George Delacorte Professor of the Humanities at Columbia University
- Frank M. Hume, colonel; commanding officer of the 103rd Infantry, 26th Division during World War I
- Happy Iott, Major League Baseball outfielder
- Natalie Kalmus, influential Technicolor engineer who was born in Houlton
- Alton Kelley, psychedelic poster artist
- Lester D. Mallory, diplomat
- Henry Clay Merriam (1837–1912), Civil War-era general, awarded the Medal of Honor
- Bern Porter (1911–2004), artist, writer, and scientist
- Samantha Smith (1972–1985), child peace activist
- Gregory Swallow, state legislator
- Danny Wilde, guitarist, singer, and founding member of pop group The Rembrandts
- Eliza Tupper Wilkes (1844–1917), Unitarian Universalist minister, suffragist
