= List of parishes in the Diocese of Portland =

This is a list of parishes located within the Roman Catholic Diocese of Portland, Maine.

== Parishes ==
=== Androscoggin County ===
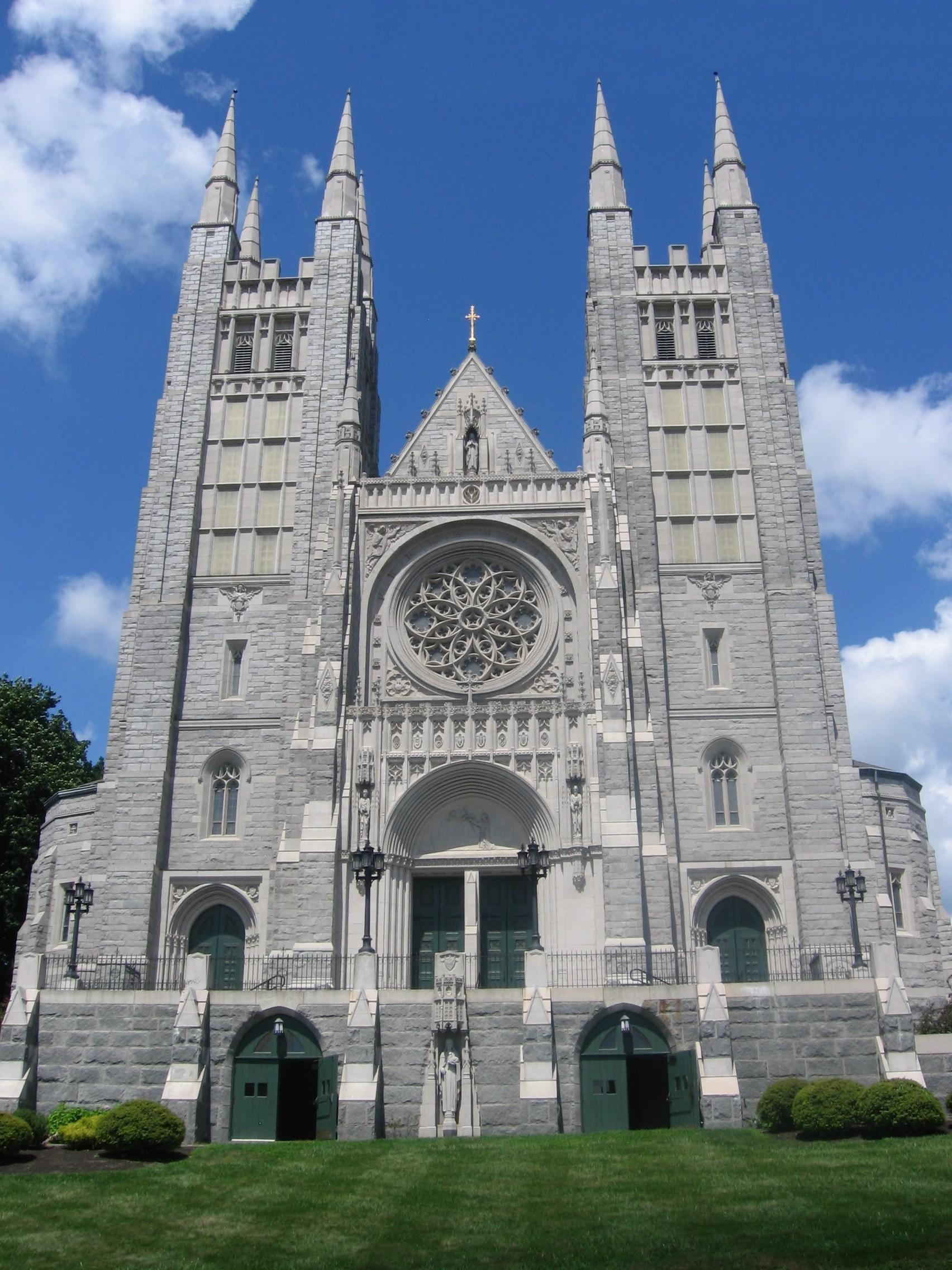
Basilica of Saints Peter and Paul (Lewiston, Maine)

- Immaculate Heart of Mary Parish
  - Sacred Heart Church, Auburn
  - Saint Philip's Church, Auburn
- Prince of Peace Parish
  - Basilica of Saints Peter and Paul, Lewiston
  - Holy Cross Church, Lewiston
  - Holy Family Church, Lewiston
  - Holy Trinity Church, Lisbon Falls
  - Our Lady of the Rosary Church, Sabattus

=== Aroostook County ===
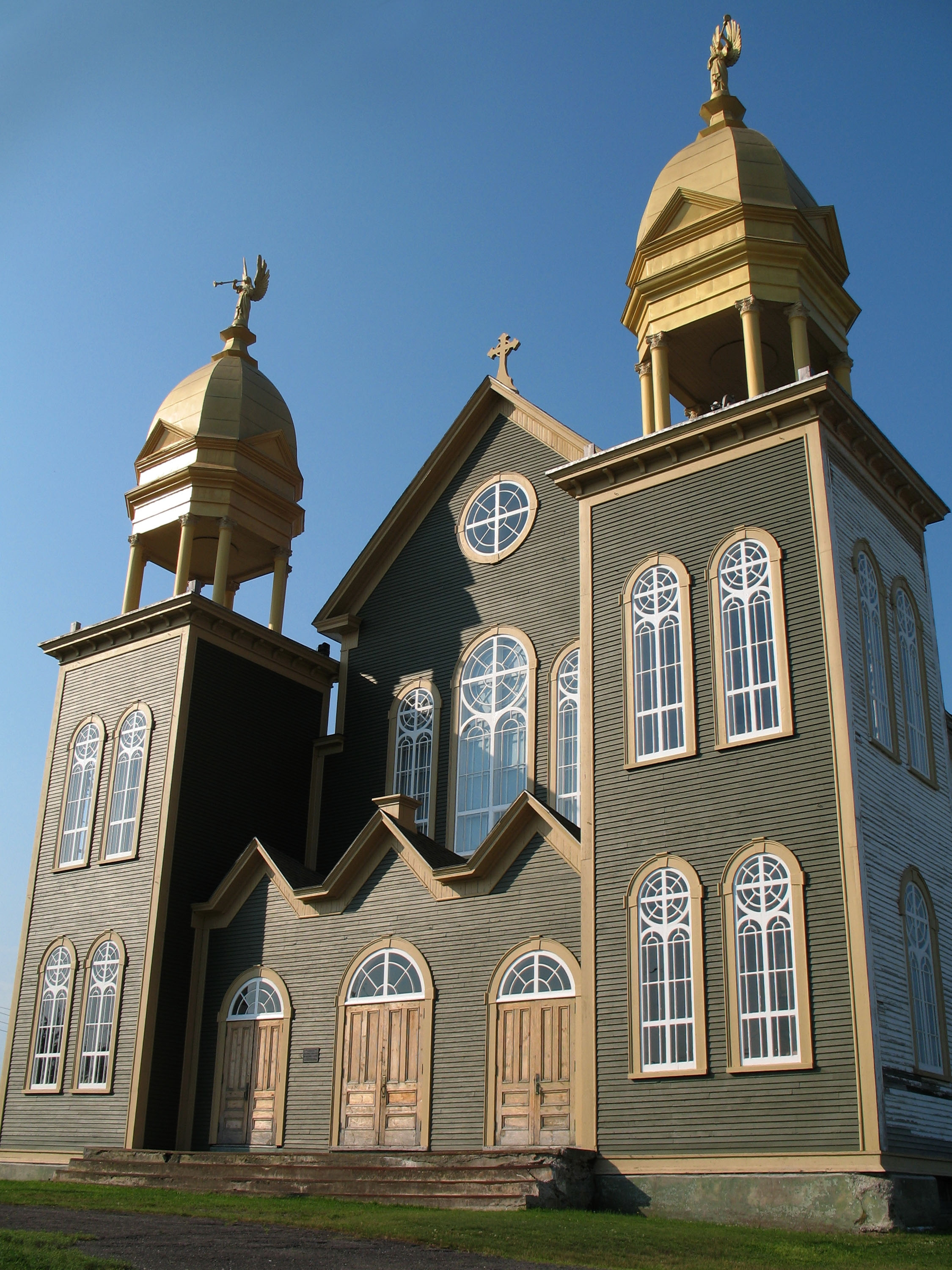
Saint Gerard-Mount Carmel Church (Grand Isle, Maine)

- Notre Dame du Mont Carmel Parish
  - Saint David Church, Madawaska
  - Saint Gerard-Mount Carmel Church, Grand Isle
  - Saint Thomas Aquinas Church, Madawaska
- Our Lady of the Valley Parish
  - Saint Agatha Church, Saint Agatha
  - Saint Joseph Church, Sinclair
  - Saint Luce Church, Frenchville
  - Saint Michael Church, Birchpoint
- Parish of the Precious Blood
  - Holy Rosary Church, Caribou
  - Nativity of the Blessed Virgin Mary Church, Presque Isle
  - Our Lady of the Lake Church, Portage
  - Sacred Heart Church, Caribou
  - Saint Catherine Church, Washburn
  - Saint Denis Church, Fort Fairfield
  - Saint Joseph Church, Mars Hill
  - Saint Louis Church, Limestone
  - Saint Mark Church, Ashland
  - Saint Theresa Church, Stockholm
- Saint Agnes Parish
  - Saint Paul Church, Patten
- Saint Benedict Parish
  - Saint Benedict Church, Benedicta
- Saint John Vianney Parish
  - Saint Charles Borromeo Church, Saint Francis
  - Saint John Church, Saint John Plantation
  - Saint Joseph Church, Wallagrass
  - Saint Louis Church, Fort Kent
  - Saint Mary Church, Eagle Lake
- Saint Mary of the Visitation Parish
  - Saint Mary of the Visitation Church, Houlton
- Saint Peter Chanel Parish
  - Saint Bruno/Saint Remi Church, Van Buren
  - Saint Joseph Church, Hamlin

=== Cumberland, Lincoln, and Sagadahoc Counties ===
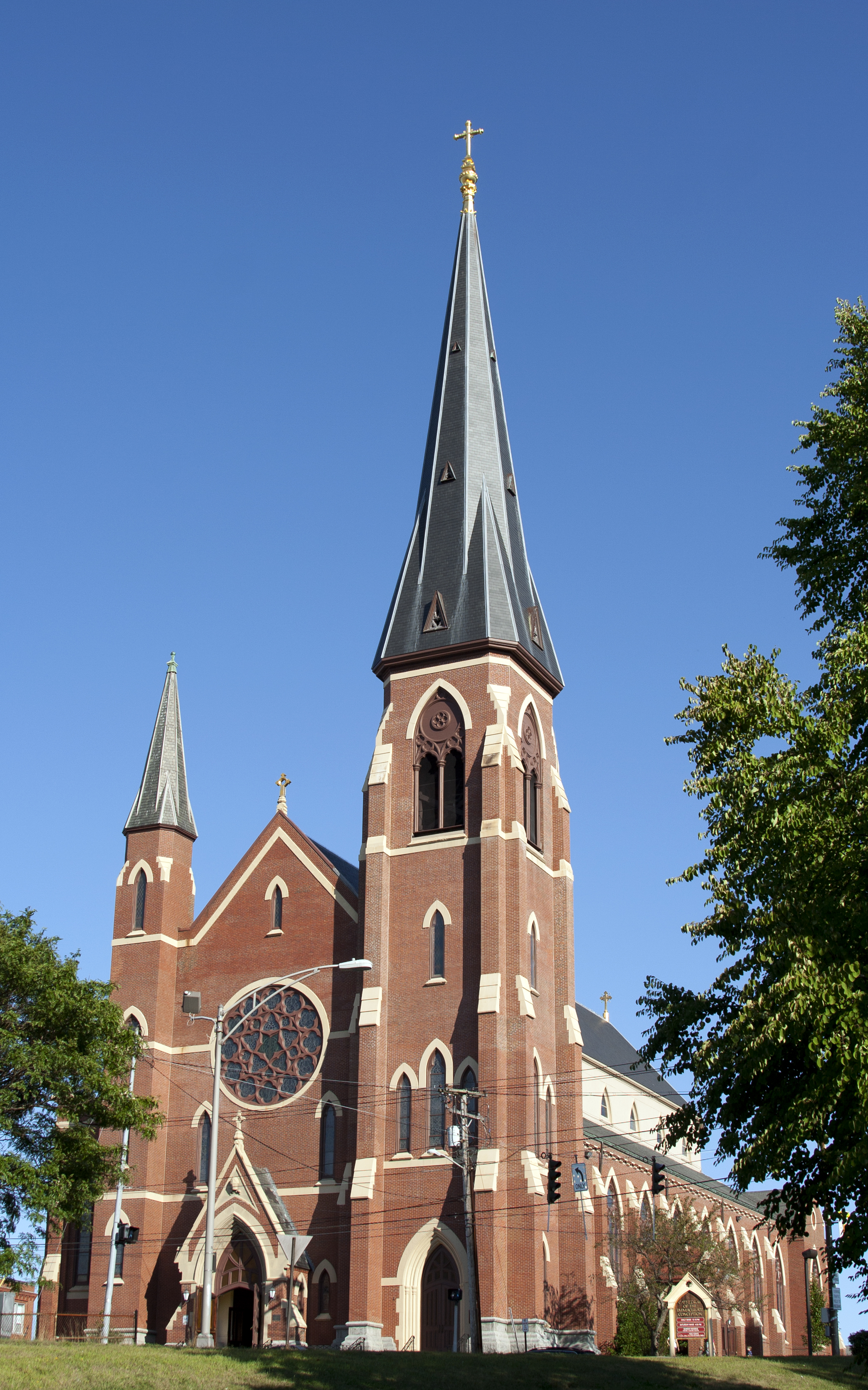
Cathedral of the Immaculate Conception (Portland, Maine)

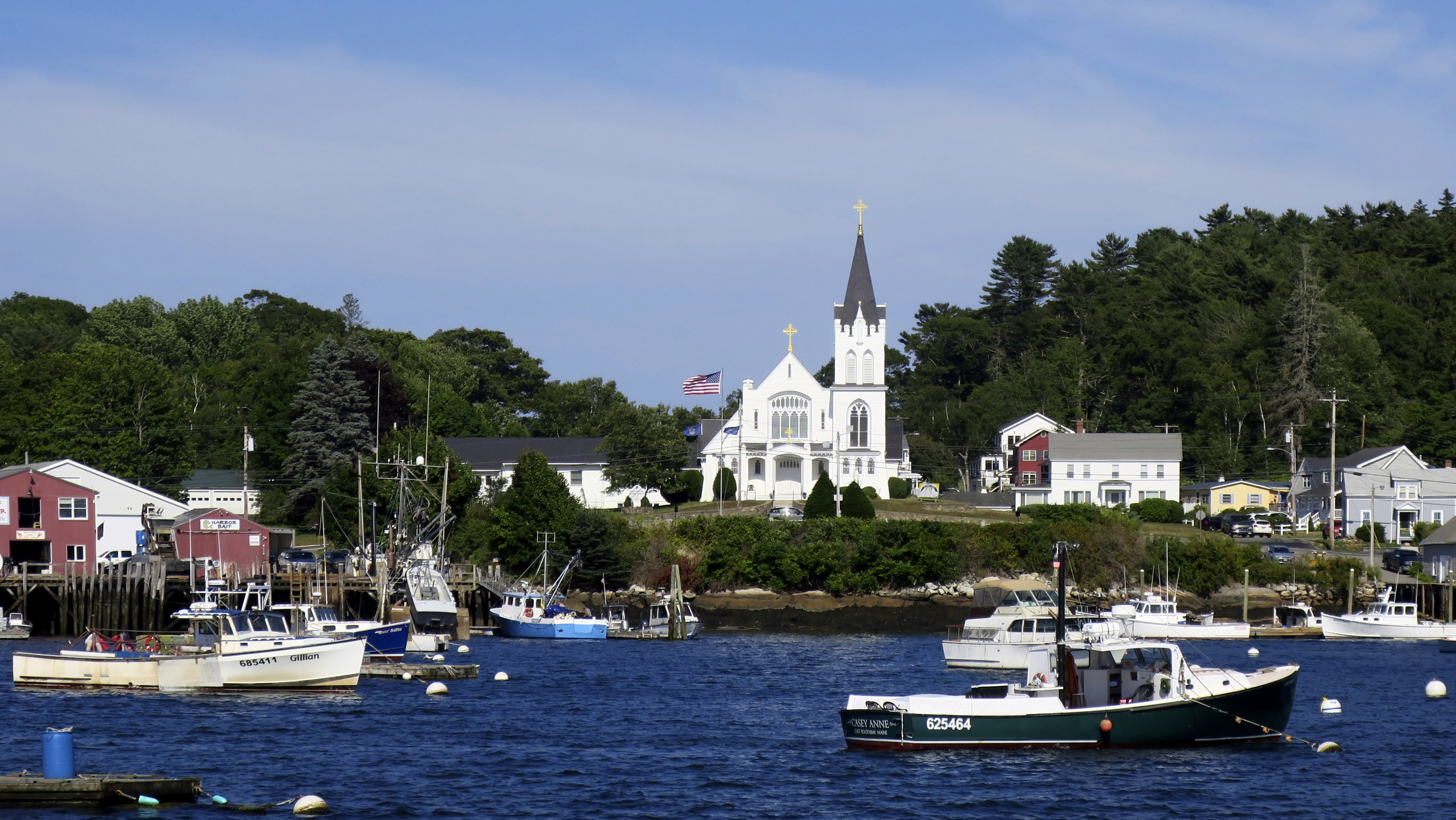
Our Lady Queen of Peace Church (Boothbay Harbor, Maine)

- All Saints Parish
  - Our Lady, Queen of Peace Church, Boothbay Harbor (Lincoln)
  - Saint Ambrose Church, Richmond (Sagadahoc)
  - Saint Charles Borromeo Church, Brunswick
  - Saint John the Baptist Church, Brunswick
  - Saint Katharine Drexel Church, Harpswell
  - Saint Mary Church, Bath (Sagadahoc)
  - Saint Patrick Church, Newcastle (Lincoln)
- Cathedral of the Immaculate Conception (Portland, Maine)
- St. Joseph Oratory, Portland
- Our Lady of Hope Parish
  - Saint Pius X Church, Portland
- Parish of the Holy Eucharist
  - Holy Martyrs of North America Church, Falmouth
  - Sacred Heart Church, Yarmouth
  - Saint Gregory Church, Gray
  - Saint Jude Church, Freeport
- Sacred Heart/Saint Dominic Parish
  - Sacred Heart Church, Portland
- Saint Anthony of Padua Parish
  - Our Lady of Perpetual Help Church, Windham
  - Our Lady of Sebago Church, Sebago
  - Saint Anne Church, Gorham
  - Saint Hyacinth Church, Westbrook
- Saint Christopher Parish
  - Our Lady, Star of the Sea Church, Long Island
- Saint John Paul II Parish
  - Holy Cross Church, South Portland
  - Saint Bartholomew Church, Cape Elizabeth
  - Saint Maximilian Kolbe Church, Scarborough
- Saint Joseph Parish
  - Saint Elizabeth Ann Seton Church, Fryeburg
  - Saint Joseph Church, Bridgton
- Saint Louis Parish and Church, Portland
- Saint Peter Parish and Church, Portland

=== Franklin County ===
- Our Lady of the Lakes Parish
  - Our Lady of the Lakes Church, Oquossoc
  - Saint Luke Church, Rangeley
  - Saint John Church, Stratton
  - Bell Chapel, Sugarloaf Mountain, Carrabassett Valley
- Saint Joseph Parish and Church, Farmington
- Saint Rose of Lima Parish and Church, Jay

=== Hancock County ===
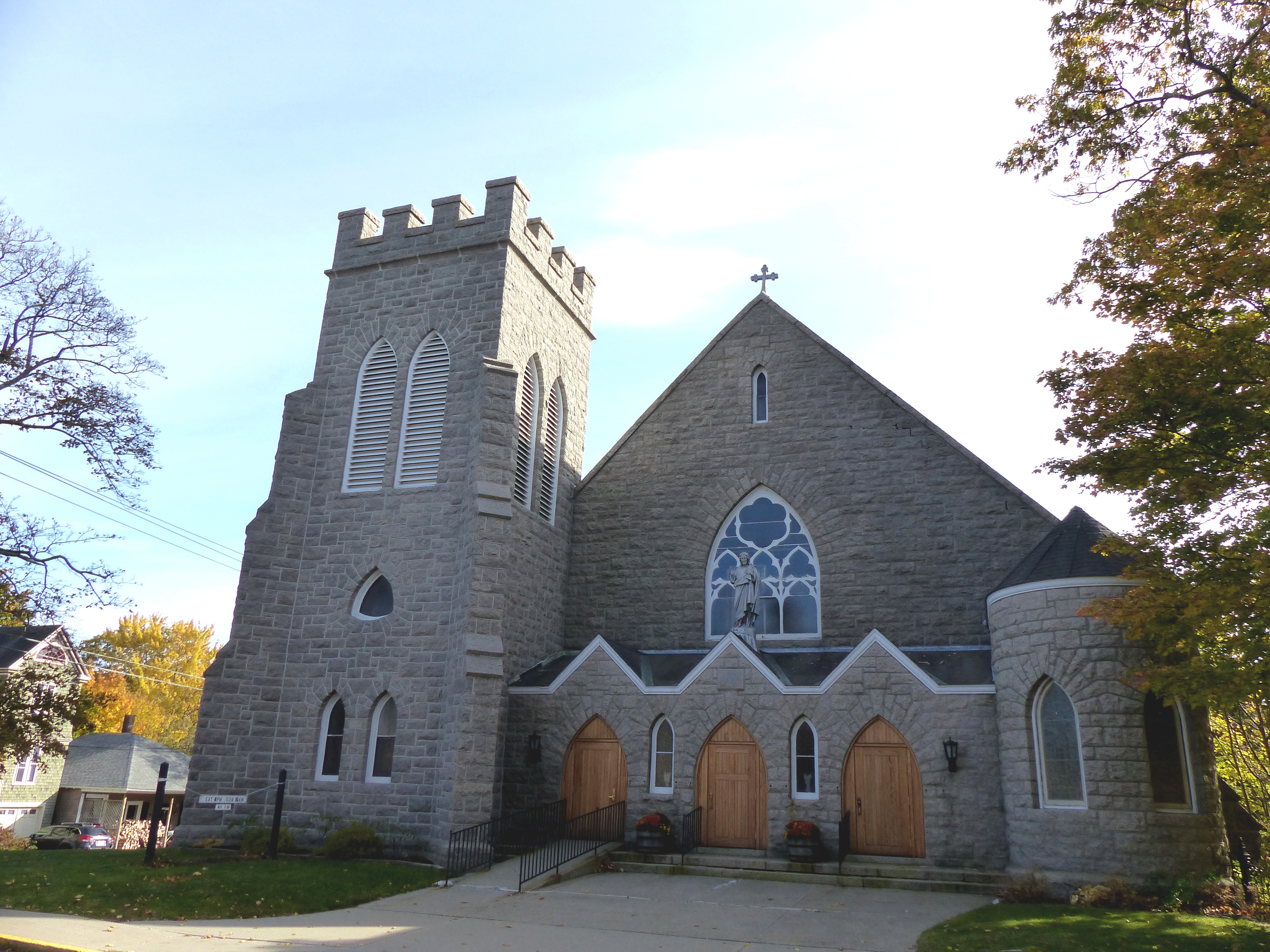
Holy Redeemer Church (Bar Harbor, Maine)

- Parish of the Transfiguration of the Lord
  - Holy Redeemer Church, Bar Harbor
  - Our Lady, Star of the Sea Church, Little Cranberry Island
  - Saint Ignatius Church, Northeast Harbor
  - Saint Peter Church, Manset
- Saint Joseph Parish (Ellsworth)
  - Saint Joseph Church, Ellsworth
  - Our Lady of the Lake Church, Dedham
  - Saint Margaret Church, Winter Harbor
- Stella Maris Parish
  - Our Lady of Holy Hope Church, Castine
  - Saint Mary, Star of the Sea Church, Stonington
  - Saint Vincent de Paul Church, Bucksport

=== Kennebec County ===
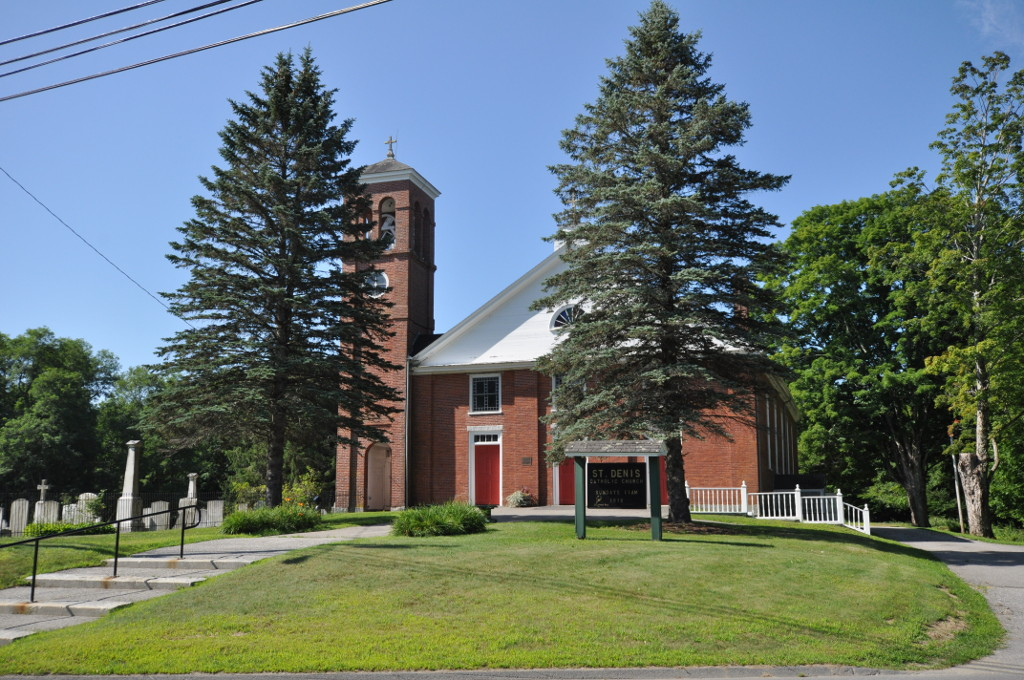
Saint Denis Church (Whitefield, Maine)

- Corpus Christi Parish
  - Notre Dame Church, Waterville
  - Saint Helena Church, Belgrade Lakes
  - Saint John the Baptist Church, Winslow
- Saint Michael Parish
  - Sacred Heart Church, Hallowell
  - Saint Augustine Church, Augusta
  - Saint Denis Church, Whitefield
  - Saint Francis Xavier Church, Winthrop
  - Saint Joseph Church, Gardiner
  - Saint Mary of the Assumption Church, Augusta

=== Knox and Waldo Counties ===
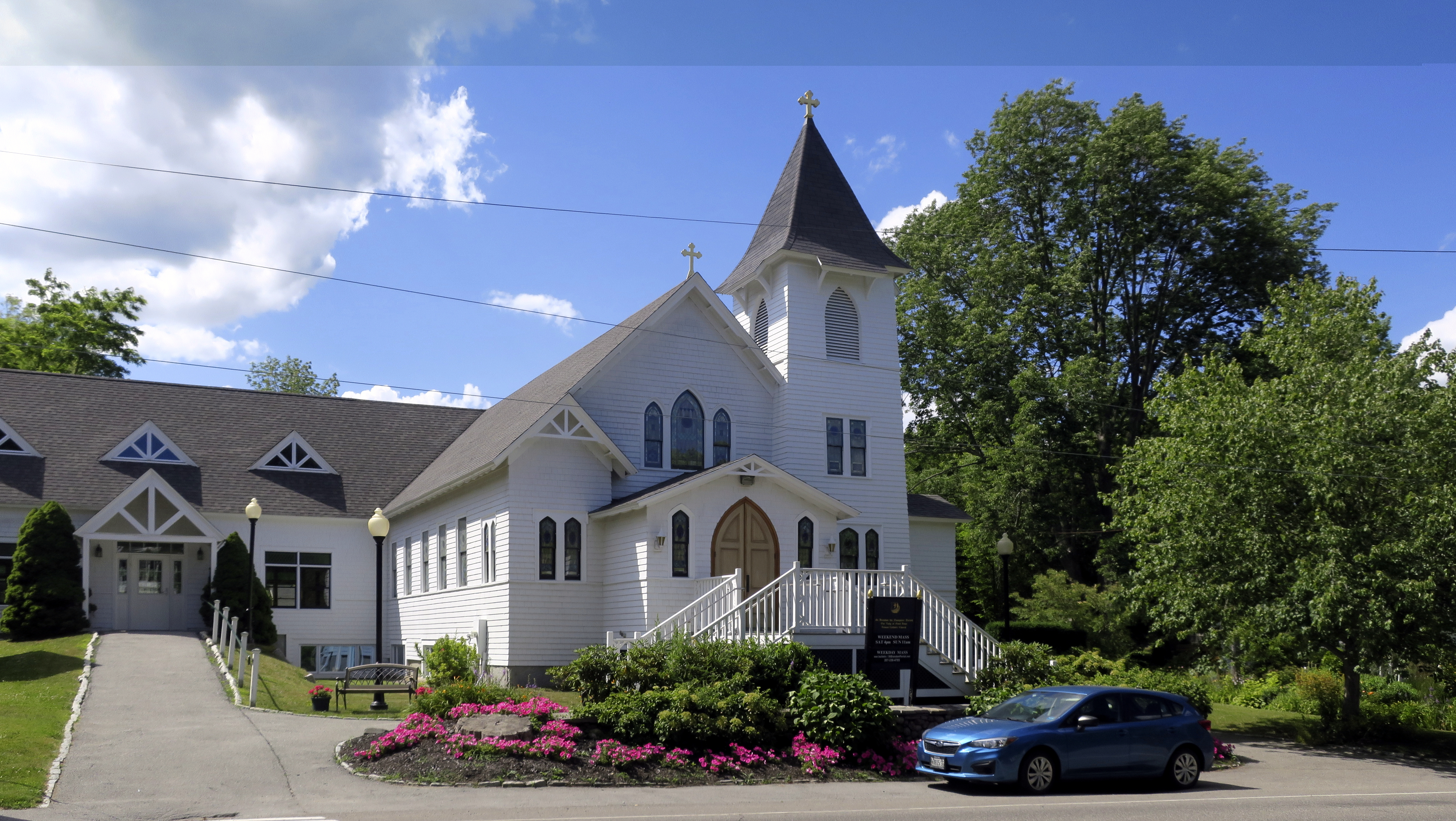
Our Lady of Good Hope Church (Camden, Maine)

- Saint Brendan the Navigator Parish
  - Our Lady of Good Hope Church, Camden
  - Saint Bernard Church, Rockland
  - Saint Francis of Assisi Church, Belfast
  - Saint Mary of the Isles Church, Islesboro
  - Union Church, Vinalhaven
  - Village Episcopal Church, North Haven

=== Oxford County ===
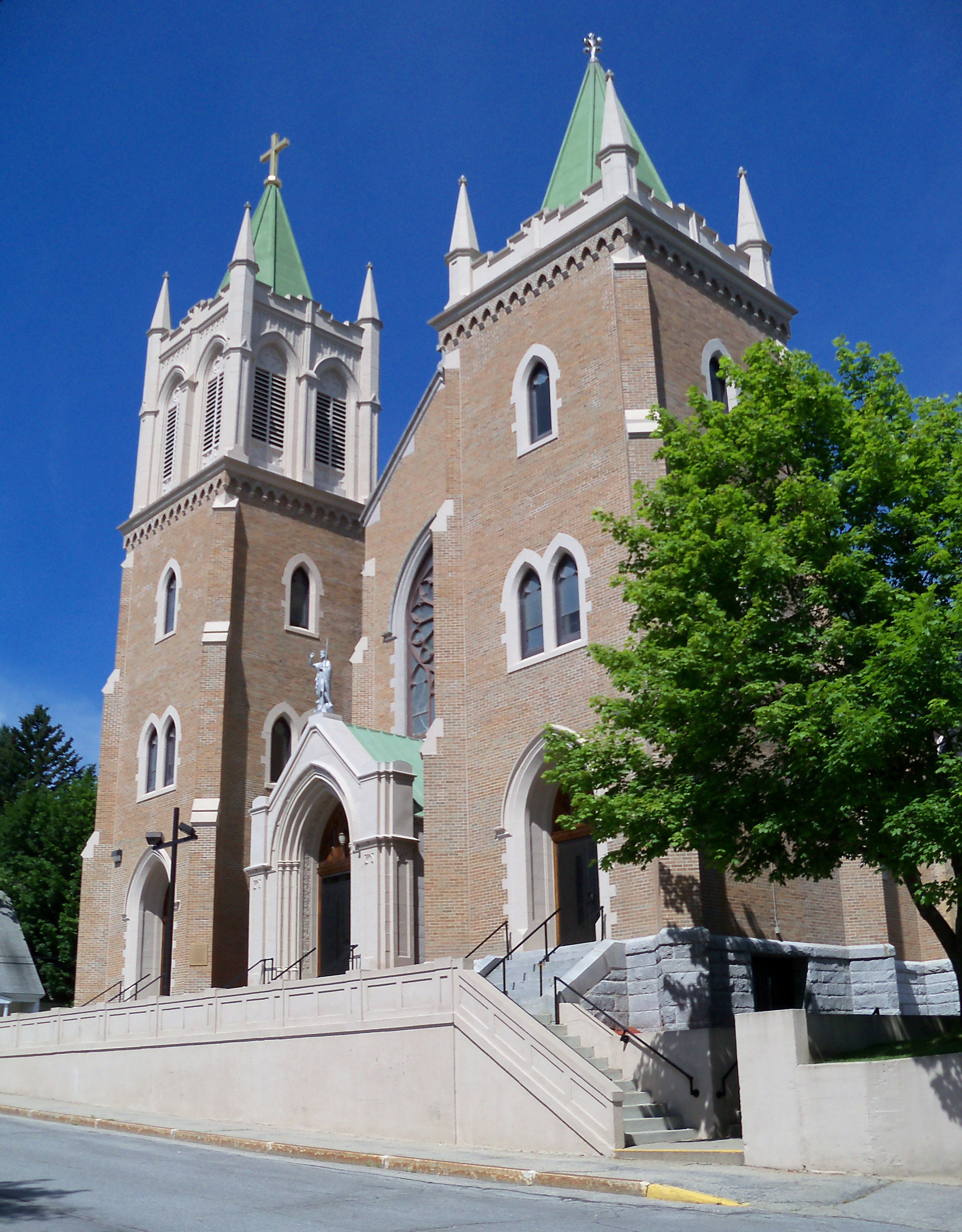
Saint Athanasius and Saint John Church (Rumford, Maine)

- Holy Savior Parish
  - Our Lady of the Snows Church, Bethel
  - Saints Athanasius and John Church, Rumford
- Saint Teresa of Calcutta Parish
  - Our Lady of Ransom Church, Mechanic Falls
  - Saint Catherine of Siena Church, Norway
  - Saint Mary Church, Oxford

=== Penobscot County ===
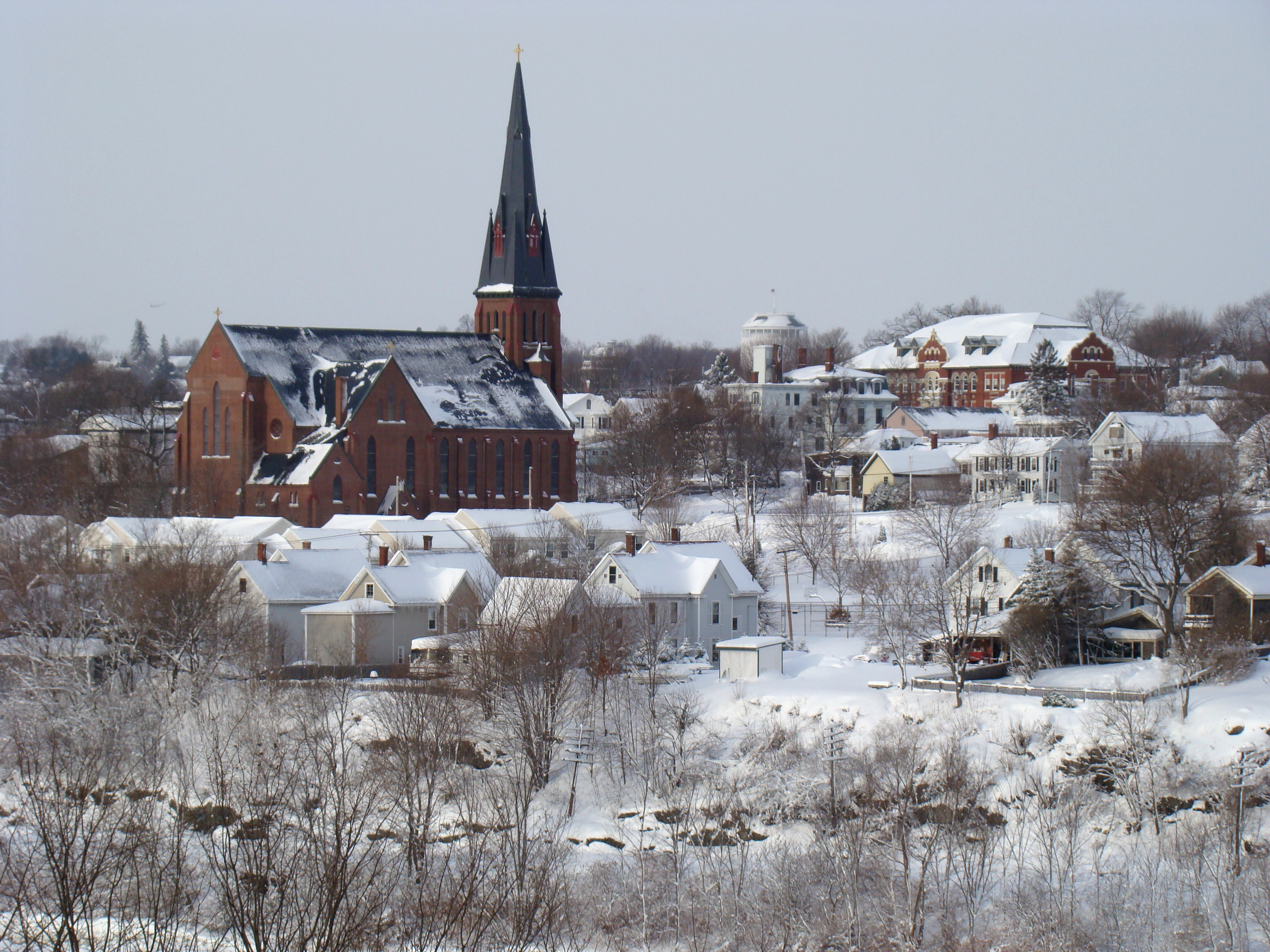
Saint John Church (Bangor, Maine)

- Christ, the Divine Mercy Parish
  - Saint Martin of Tours Church, Millinocket
  - Saint Peter Church, East Millinocket
- Our Lady of the Eucharist Parish
  - Saint Anne Church, Danforth
  - Saint Leo the Great Church, Howland
  - Saint Mary of Lourdes Church, Lincoln
- Our Lady of the Snows Parish
  - Saints Francis Xavier and Paul the Apostle Church, Milo
  - Saint Anne Church, Dexter
  - Saint Thomas Aquinas Church, Dover-Foxcroft
- Resurrection of the Lord Parish
  - Holy Family Church, Old Town
  - Our Lady of Wisdom Church, Orono
  - Saint Ann Church, Bradley
  - Saint Ann Church, Indian Island Reservation
- Saint Paul the Apostle Parish
  - Saint Gabriel Church, Winterport
  - Saint John Church, Bangor
  - Saint Joseph Church, Brewer
  - Saint Mary Church, Bangor
  - Saint Matthew Church, Hampden
  - Saint Teresa Church, Brewer

=== Piscataquis County ===
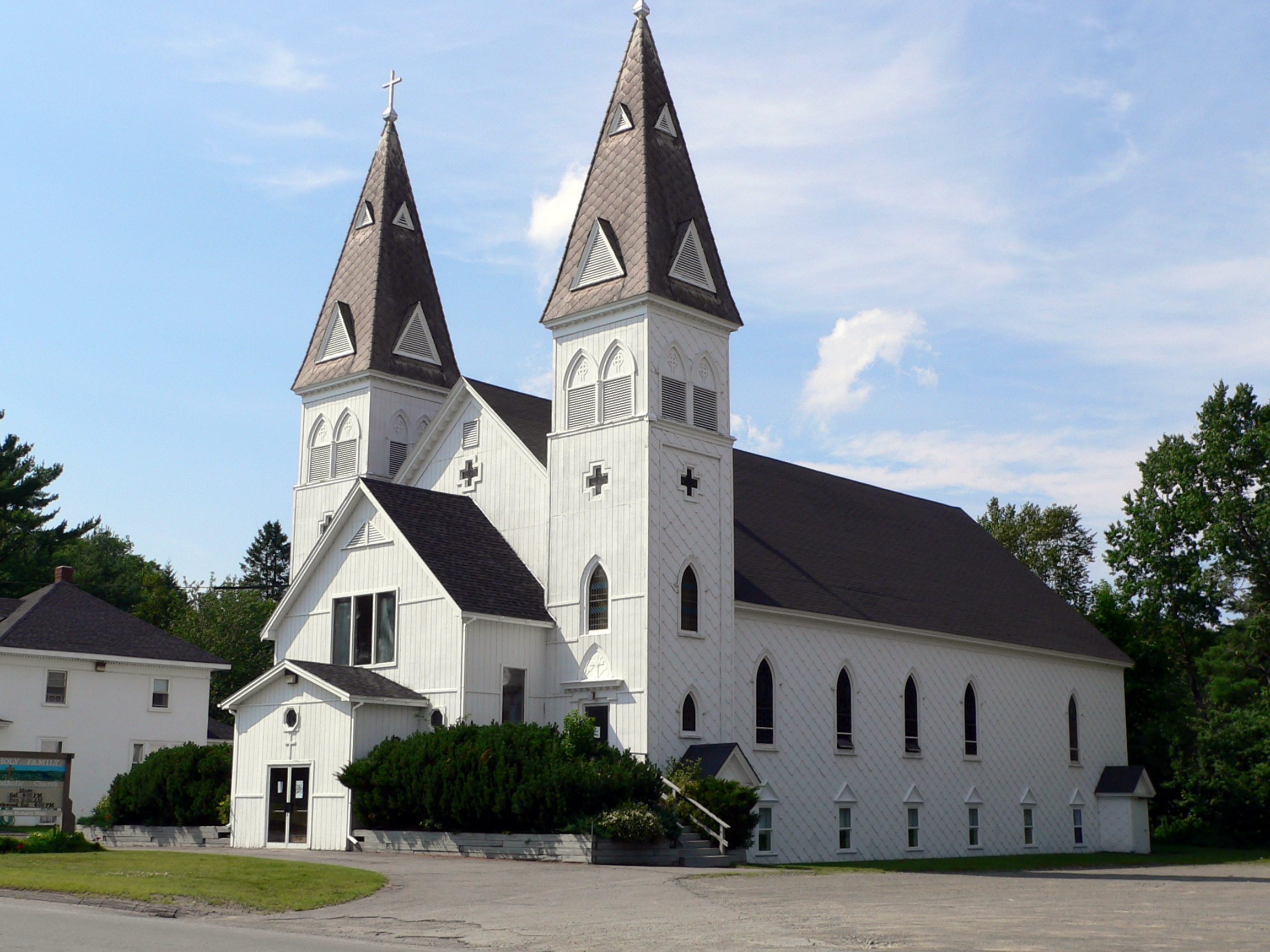
Holy Family Church (Greenville, Maine)

- Holy Family Parish
  - Holy Family Church, Greenville
  - Saint Joseph Church, Rockwood Township
- Saint Anthony of Padua Parish
  - Saint Faustina Church, Jackman

=== Somerset County ===
- Christ the King Parish
  - Notre Dame de Lourdes Church, Skowhegan
  - Saint Peter Church, Bingham
  - Saint Sebastian Church, Madison
- Saint Agnes Parish and Church, Pittsfield

=== Washington County ===
- Saint Kateri Tekakwitha Parish
  - Immaculate Conception Church, Calais
  - Saint Ann Church, Indian Township Reservation
  - Saint James the Greater Church, Baileyville
  - Saint John the Evangelist Church, Pembroke
  - Saint Joseph Church, Eastport
- Saint Peter the Fisherman Parish
  - Holy Name Church, Machias
  - Sacred Heart Church, Lubec
  - Saint Michael Church, Cherryfield
  - Saint Timothy Church, Campobello Island (Canada)

=== York County ===
- Good Shepherd Parish
  - Saint Brendan Chapel, Biddeford Pool
  - Saint Joseph Church, Biddeford
    - Saint Anne Chapel
  - Saint Margaret Church, Old Orchard Beach
  - Saint Philip Church, Lyman
  - Most Holy Trinity Church, Saco
- Holy Spirit Parish
  - All Saints Church, Ogunquit
  - Saint Martha Church, Kennebunk
  - Saint Mary Church, Wells
- Parish of the Ascension of the Lord
  - Our Lady of the Angels Church, South Berwick
  - Saint Christopher Church, York
  - Saint Raphael Church, Kittery
  - Star of the Sea Church, York Beach
- Saint Matthew Parish and Church, Limerick
- St. Thérèse of Lisieux Parish
  - Holy Family Church, Sanford
  - Notre Dame Church, Springvale
