= Our Lady Star of the Sea Church =

Our Lady Star of the Sea Church, or variations, may refer to the following churches:

== Australia ==
- Our Lady Star of the Sea Church & School, Gladstone, Queensland
- St Mary Star of the Sea, Peppermint Grove, Western Australia
- St Mary Star of the Sea, West Melbourne, Victoria

== United Kingdom ==
- Our Lady Star of the Sea and St Winefride, Amlwch, Anglesey, Wales
- St Mary Star of the Sea Church, Hastings, East Sussex, England
- Our Lady Star of the Sea Church, Lowestoft, Suffolk, England
- Our Lady Star of the Sea, Seaforth, Merseyside, England
- Our Lady Star of the Sea Church, Staithes, North Yorkshire, England
- Church of Our Lady Star of the Sea, Wallasey, Merseyside, England
- Our Ladye Star of the Sea, Greenwich, London, England
- Our Lady Star of the Sea, a Roman Catholic primary school in Horden, County Durham, England

== United States ==
- Mary Star of the Sea Catholic Church, San Pedro, California
- Our Lady Star of the Sea Church (Stamford, Connecticut)
- Basilica of St. Mary Star of the Sea (Key West, Florida)
- Star of the Sea Painted Church, Kalapana, Hawaii
- St. Mary, Star of the Sea (Baltimore, Maryland)
- Our Lady Star of the Sea Catholic Church (Solomons, Maryland)
- St. Mary Star of the Sea Catholic Church (Jackson, Michigan)
- Church of Our Lady Star of the Sea (Staten Island), New York
- St. Mary Star of the Sea (Newport, Vermont)

== Other countries ==
- Our Lady, Star of the Sea & St Maughold Church, Ramsey, Isle of Man
- Stella Maris Church, Sliema, the Archpresbyterial church and matrice of Our Lady Star of the Sea, Malta
- Church of Our Lady Star of the Sea, Singapore
- Mary Star of the Sea Church, Grand Case, Saint Martin
- Basilica of Our Lady, Maastricht, referred to as the Star of the Sea (Dutch: Sterre der Zee), Netherlands

== See also ==
- Mary Star of the Sea (disambiguation)
- Our Lady, Star of the Sea, an ancient title for the Virgin Mary
- Our Lady Star of the Sea High School (Michigan)
- Patronage of the Blessed Virgin Mary
- Star of the Sea College
- Star of the Sea (disambiguation)
- Stella Maris (disambiguation) (Latin for 'star of the sea')
