= Star of the Sea (disambiguation) =

Star of the Sea (Latin: stella maris) is an ancient title for the Virgin Mary.

Star of the Sea may also refer to:

== Film ==
- The Star of the Sea (1915 film), a lost American silent film
- Star of the Sea (1928 film), an Italian silent film
- Star of the Sea (1938 film), an Italian comedy

== Literature ==
- Star of the Sea (novel), by Joseph O'Connor, 2002
- Havets stjärna ('Star of the Sea'), a 1906 work by Swedish poet Vilhelm Ekelund
- "Star of the Sea", a 1991 short story in the Time Patrol series by Paul Anderson

== Music ==
- "Star of the Sea", an 1883 song that provided the music for "Star of the East" (song), written in 1890
- "Star of the Sea", a 1996 work for chamber music by Chan Ka Nin
- "Star of the Sea", a song by Silvery from the 2008 album Thunderer & Excelsior
- Star of the Sea, a 2009 EP by Kai Altair

== Other uses ==
- Star of the Sea, a British trawler sunk in 1917
- Star of the Sea, name of the D-548, a D-class lifeboat (EA16)
- Star of the Sea College, a Catholic girls' school in Melbourne, Australia
- Star of the Sea (basketball), a Northern Irish basketball team
- Star of the Sea, the Type 346 Radar, used in the Chinese navy
- Star of the Sea, a horse that came in third in the 1976 Hutcheson Stakes
- Star of the Sea Association, a fishermen's fraternity that originated the Newfoundland Tricolour flag
- Star of the Sea Hall, a historic place in St John's, Newfoundland, Canada

== See also ==
- Stella Maris (disambiguation)
- Mary Star of the Sea (disambiguation)
- Our Lady Star of the Sea Church (disambiguation), the name of many churches
- Star of the Sea School (disambiguation), the name of many Catholic schools
