= Marie de la Mer =

Marie de la Mer may refer to:

- Our Lady, Star of the Sea, a title for the Virgin Mary
- Saintes-Maries-de-la-Mer, a French city

== See also ==
- Mary Star of the Sea (disambiguation)
