= Stella Maris =

Stella Maris (Latin, 'star of the sea') may refer to:

- Our Lady, Star of the Sea, a title given to the Virgin Mary
- Polaris, a star commonly called the North Star or Pole Star, associated with the Virgin Mary

== Arts and entertainment ==
=== Films ===
- Stella Maris (1918 film), with Mary Pickford
- Stella Maris (1925 film), remake with Mary Philbin

=== Music ===
- Stella Maris, a 1987 album by The Albion Band
- "Stella Maris", a song by Einstürzende Neubauten from the 1996 album Ende Neu
- "Stella Maris", a song by Moby from the 2011 album Destroyed
- "Stella Maris", a 2013 composition by Samuel Hazo
- "Stella Maris", a song by Gigi Masin from the 2014 album Talk to the Sea

=== Literature ===
- Stella Maris (novel), a 2022 novel by Cormac McCarthy
- The Illuminatus! Trilogy (novel), a 1983 novel by Robert Shea and Robert Anton Wilson, includes a character named Stella Maris

== Places ==
- Stella Maris, Darwin, Australia, a historical site
- Stella Maris, Bahamas
  - Stella Maris Airport
- Stella Maris Light, lighthouse in Haifa, Israel
- Stella Maris Homes, a housing development in Packer Park, Philadelphia
- Stella Maris, a neighborhood in Salvador, Bahia, Brazil

== Schools, religious institutions and hospitals ==
- Stella Maris Catholic Primary School, in Park Grove, Tasmania, Australia
- Stella Maris College (disambiguation)
- Stella Maris High School, Queens, New York, U.S.
- Stella Maris English School, Pune, Maharashtra, India
- Stella Maris Hospice, a large nursing home complex in Timonium, Maryland
- Stella Maris Monastery, Haifa, Israel
- Stella Maris Polytechnic University, Monrovia, Liberia
- Stella Maris Primary School, Silverdale, Auckland, New Zealand
- Stella Maris School, Stockport, England
- Stella Maris (seafarers' ministry) (formerly known as the Apostleship of the Sea), a Catholic welfare organization for seafarers
- Stella-Maris-De-Kent Hospital, Sainte-Anne-de-Kent, New Brunswick, Canada

== Ships ==
- MV Stella Maris (1935), a German and Dutch cargo ship in service 1957-58
- MV Stella Maris II (1965–1998), a cruise ship with Sun Lines
- ST Stella Maris (1882), steam tug in Halifax Explosion of 1917
- Stella Maris 28-C, formerly Empire Sandboy, a dredger
- Stella Maris, formerly HMCS Hespeler, a Panamanian ship 1960–1965

== Other uses ==
- ITC Stella Maris, tennis complex in Umag, Croatia
- Stella Maris F.C., an Irish youth football club
- Stella Maris Olalla, Argentine politician
- Stella Maris, the 52nd Rector of the University of St Andrews
- Stella Maris, a type of virtual periscope
- Stellamaris, a unit from the Re:Stage! franchise

== See also ==
- Star of the Sea (disambiguation)
- Our Lady Star of the Sea Church (disambiguation)
- Mary, mother of Jesus
- "Ave maris stella", a medieval Marian hymn
- Stella Moris
