= Academie Brochu =

- U.S. National Register of Historic Places
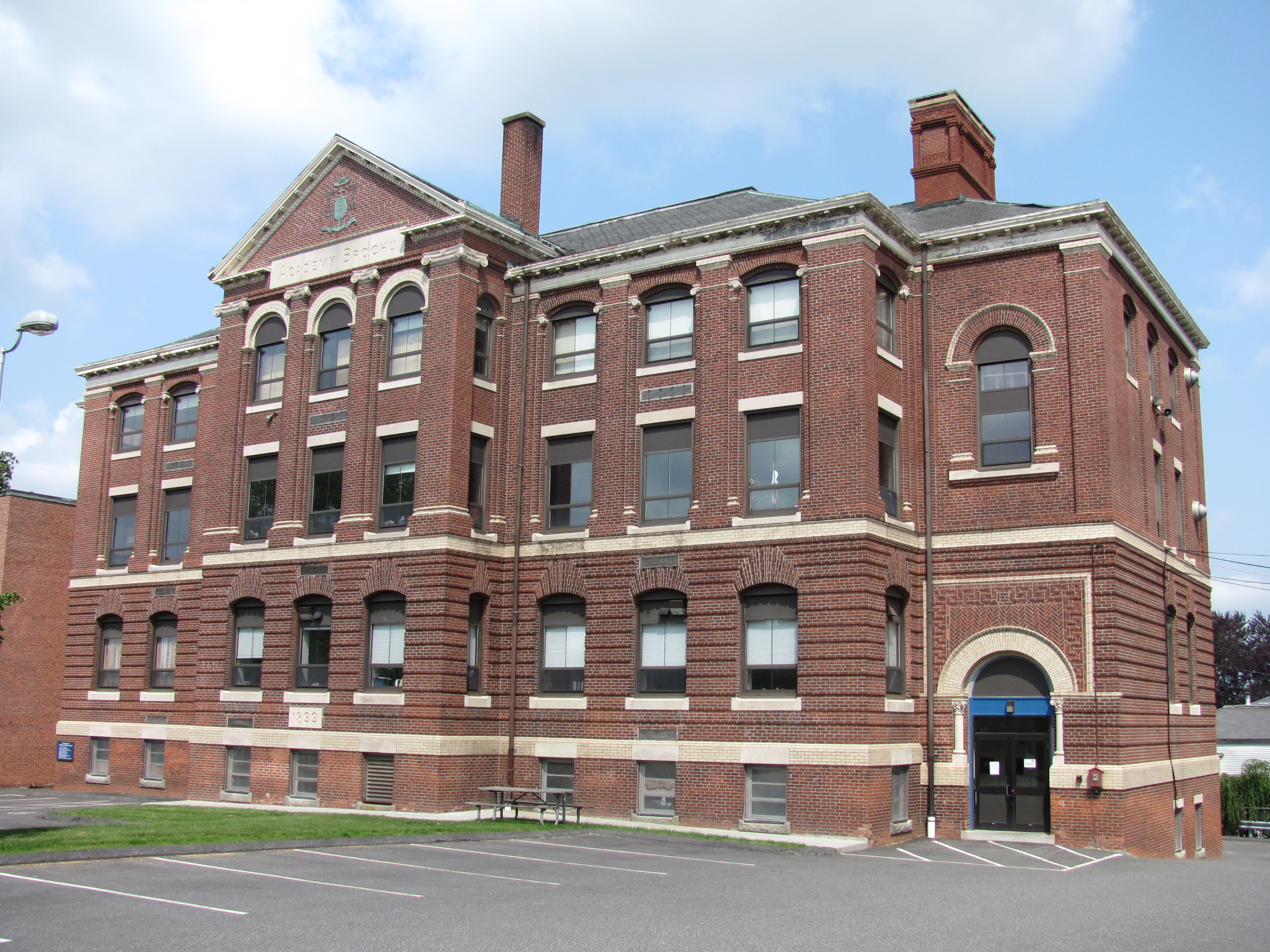
- Academie Brochu

- Location within Massachusetts Location within the United States
- Location: 29 Pine St., Southbridge, Massachusetts
- Coordinates: 42°4′46″N 72°2′17″W
- Built: 1899
- Architect: Chickering & O'Connell
- Architectural style: Colonial Revival
- MPS: Southbridge MRA
- NRHP reference No.: 89000568
- Added to NRHP: June 22, 1989

The Academie Brochu is a historic school at 29 Pine Street in Southbridge, Massachusetts. Built in 1899, it is one of the city's most imposing Colonial Revival buildings, and a significant element of the development of its Franco-American community. The building was listed on the National Register of Historic Places on June 22, 1989. It was gifted to Harrington Memorial Hospital and now houses Harrington Health System offices.

== Description and history ==
The Academie Brochu is located on the east side of Pine Street, south of its junction with Hamilton Street in central Southbridge. It is a three-story brick structure, set on a raised stone foundation, with a hip roof. Its red brick walls are contrasted by limestone and yellow brick trim, and a metal cornice and frieze below the roofline. The academy was constructed in 1899 by Chickering & O'Connell of Springfield in a Colonial Revival style to serve the growing French Canadian population of Southbridge.

The academy was named for Msgr. George Elzear Brochu, pastor of the Notre Dame Church, who gave personal funds to the effort. The academy served as the parish school for Notre Dame Parish, and was run first by the Sisters of St. Anne, and then by the Sisters of the Assumption from Nicolet, Quebec. The school had been established in 1881, and was by the late 1890s in need of proper quarters. The academy building has six classrooms on each of the first two floors, and a chapel on the third floor that is large enough to hold the entire school population. The Colonial Revival styling is at odds with the more traditional French styling of the neighboring church, but it is still one of the most imposing buildings in the town.

== See also ==
- National Register of Historic Places listings in Southbridge, Massachusetts
- National Register of Historic Places listings in Worcester County, Massachusetts
