= Stella Maris College =

Stella Maris College may refer to:

- Stella Maris Presentation College, a parent college of Nagle Catholic College in Geraldton, Australia
- Stella Maris College, a parent college of Chanel College in Gladstone, Australia
- Stella Maris College (Frankston), in Melbourne, Australia
- Stella Maris College, Manly, in Sydney, Australia
- Stella Maris College, Chennai, in Chennai, India
- Stella Maris College (Malta), a Lasallian educational institution in Malta
- Stella Maris College (Meerssen), in Meerssen, the Netherlands
- Stella Maris College (Valkenburg), in Valkenburg aan de Geul, the Netherlands
- Stella Maris College, Port Harcourt, Nigeria
- Stella Maris College Quezon City, in the Philippines
- Stella Maris College, Nkokonjeru, Uganda
- Stella Maris College (Montevideo), in Montevideo, Uruguay

== See also ==
- Stella Maris (disambiguation)
