= Our Lady Star of the Sea Church (Stamford, Connecticut) =

Coordinates: 41°02′10.14″N 73°31′38.39″W

- Our Lady Star of the Sea Church
- Location: 1220 Shippan Avenue; Stamford, Connecticut
- Country: United States
- Denomination: Roman Catholic

Administration
- Province: Hartford
- Diocese: Bridgeport

Clergy
- Bishop: Frank Joseph Caggiano
- Pastor: Fr. Piotr Smolik

Our Lady Star of the Sea is a Roman Catholic church in Stamford, Connecticut, part of the Diocese of Bridgeport.

== History ==
Our Lady Star of the Sea Parish was formed in 1964 by Bishop Walter W. Curtis to relieve overcrowding in nearby St. Mary's Church. The modern church with some Romanesque Revival features is located close to the Atlantic Ocean. The property is 5 acres and contains a rectory, convent, church, school building, and playground area.

The parish supported an elementary school that was designated a Blue Ribbon school in 2010. The school was closed in June of 2017 due to lack of enrollment.
