= Basilica of Saints Peter and Paul (Lewiston, Maine) =

Historic church in Maine, United States

- Basilique Saint-Pierre et Saint-Paul
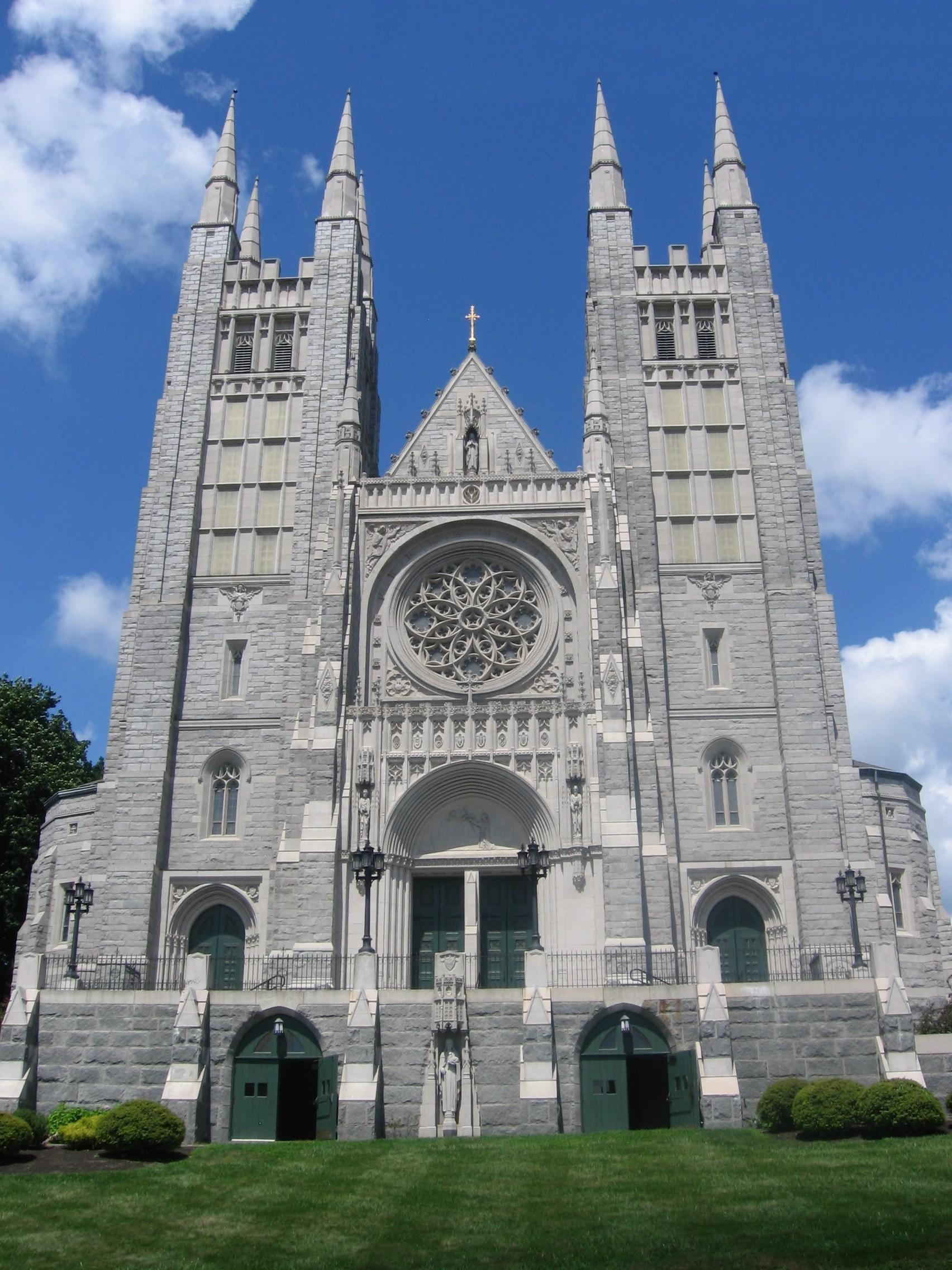
- The Basilica of Ss. Peter and Paul, as seen from the front.
- Basilica of Saints Peter and Paul
- 44°5′53.376″N 70°12′44.2296″W
- Location: 27 Bartlett St., Lewiston, Maine
- Country: United States
- Denomination: Catholic Church
- Sui iuris church: Latin Church

History
- Dedicated: October 23, 1938
- Consecrated: October 4, 2004

Architecture
- Architect(s): Noel Coumont & Timothy G. O'Connell
- Style: Gothic
- Completed: July 18, 1936

Specifications
- Capacity: 2,200
- Length: 316 feet (96 m)
- Width: 110 feet (34 m)
- Height: 167 feet (51 m)

Administration
- Parish: Prince of Peace
- Ss. Peter and Paul Church
- U.S. National Register of Historic Places
- Location within Maine Location within the United States
- Area: 1 acre (0.40 ha)
- NRHP reference No.: 83000447
- Added to NRHP: July 14, 1983

The Basilica of Saints Peter and Paul (French: Basilique Saint-Pierre et Saint-Paul) in Lewiston, Maine, also known as Ss. Peter and Paul Church, is a church which is a part of the Roman Catholic Diocese of Portland.

== History ==
In the mid-nineteenth century, Lewiston had an influx of Roman Catholic French Canadians who came to work in the local textile mills. Their arrival created the need for a French-speaking priest. Initially, masses were held in the basement of Saint Joseph's Church, until the number of parishioners attending the masses reached 1,000. Because of the large number of French-speaking parishioners, the masses were moved to the nave of Saint John's on July 2, 1870. By 1871, the number of parishioners had grown too large even for Saint John's. The following year, the cornerstone of Saint Peter's was laid, and the dedication mass was said in 1873. In 1881, the Dominican Fathers of Lille, France, and the Province of Quebec took over the administration of the church. In 1899, the first reference to Saint Peter and Saint Paul was made, when the Dominicans published their Album Historique, calling the parishes S. Pierre S. Paul de Lewiston, Maine. In 1902, the parish was split to create the Saint Louis church, across the river, in Auburn.

By 1905, even after the split, the church had gained almost 10,000 parishioners. The old church had to be torn down, and the basement of the new church was finished in 1906. In 1907 and 1923, the Diocese of Portland requested that the parish be split, to create the parishes of Saint Mary's in 1907, and the Holy Cross and the Holy Family in 1923. Each time the parish divided, the money it had in its building fund to complete the church was also divided, delaying the top of the church from being built. Finally, in 1933, the Diocese of Portland allowed the parish to build the top part of the church. The church was finished on July 18, 1936, and was dedicated on October 23, 1938, to the saints the church whose name it bears, Saint Peter and Saint Paul. On July 14, 1983, the church was added to the National Register of Historic Places, for being the second-largest church in New England. In 1986, the Dominicans handed the administration of the church back to the Diocese of Portland. In 1991, the upper church started a renovation project that ended in 2002 with the dedication of a new altar. From 2002 to 2007, the chapel under the church was renovated and reopened, just in time for Mardi Gras, and—incidentally—Lent.

In a 2015 article in the Bangor Daily News, it was reported that the Church was one of the few remaining churches in Maine that still offered a Mass in French. It was reported in the Portland Press Herald that an influx of French-speaking Roman Catholic immigrants from central Africa have been a driving force in supporting the French-language mass.

== Organs ==
The church has two pipe organs both made by Casavant Frères which were both dedicated in 1938; Opus 1587 (above the sanctuary) and Opus 1588 (in the gallery). Both are electro-pneumatic.

=== Sanctuary Organ ===
This organ is in center chambers at the front of the room with visible façade pipes or case front. It has 2 manuals, 3 divisions, 10 stops, 28 registers, 10 ranks, and 737 pipes. Manual compass is 61 notes. Pedal compass is 32 notes.

=== Gallery Organ ===
This organ has 4 manuals, 5 divisions, 53 stops, 62 registers, 66 ranks, and 4,622 pipes. Manual compass is 61 notes. Pedal compass is 32 notes. This organ is the largest church organ in Maine.

== See also ==
Side view of the Basilica

- Diocese of Portland
- Basilicas in the United States
