= St. Andre's Parish =

Historic church in Maine, United States

- U.S. National Register of Historic Places
- U.S. Historic district
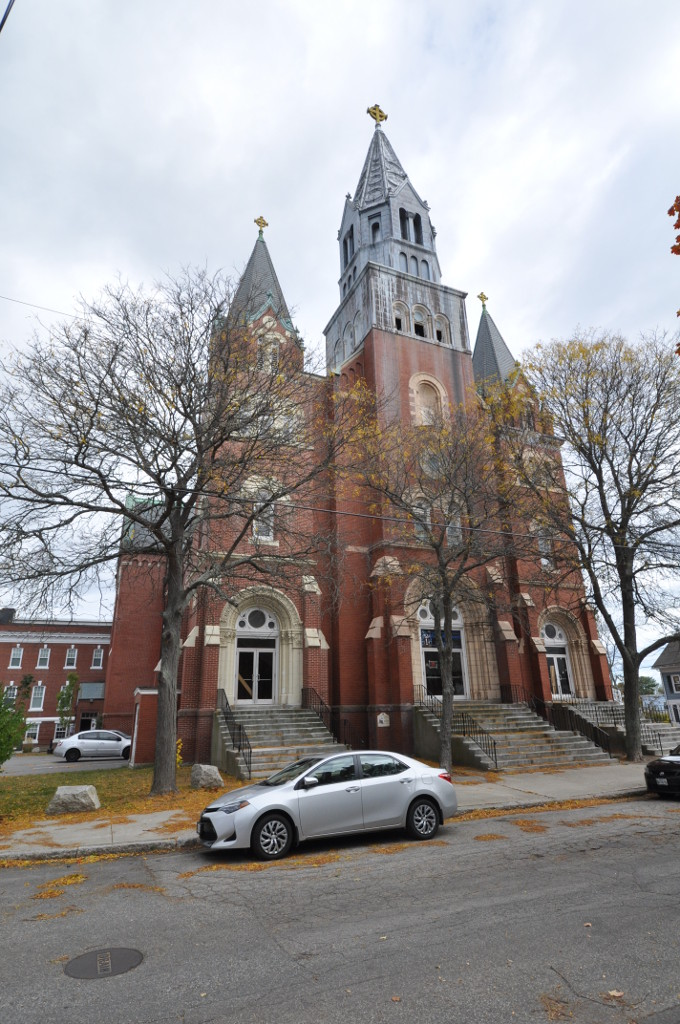
- 1940s postcard view of the church and rectory

- Location within Maine Location within the United States
- Location: 73, 77 Bacon & 39, 41 Sullivan Sts. Biddeford, Maine
- Coordinates: 43°29′25″N 70°27′2″W
- Area: 2.9 acres (1.2 ha)
- Built: 1897
- Architect: Chickering & O'Connell
- Architectural style: Gothic Revival
- NRHP reference No.: 15000771
- Added to NRHP: November 10, 2015

St. Andre's Parish is a former parish of the Roman Catholic Diocese of Portland, located on Bacon and Sullivan Streets in Biddeford, Maine, USA. The parish was founded in 1860 to serve the city's large French-Canadian and French-American communities. On July 1, 2008, St. Andres was merged into the newly formed Good Shepherd Parish. The parish complex of four buildings, including the church, rectory, convent and school, was listed on the National Register of Historic Places in 2015, at which time most of it stood vacant.

== Description and history ==
The buildings of St. Andre's are located near the junction of Bacon and Sullivan Streets, south of Biddeford's central business district. The parish property extends along most of a city block bounded by Bacon, Sullivan, and High Streets, ending short of properties that front on Water Street. The church, a Romanesque Revival brick structure completed in 1910 to a design by the Boston firm of Chickering & O'Connell, stands at the corner of Bacon and High, with the rectory to its left, at the corner of Bacon and Sullivan. The rectory is a fine example of Second Empire architecture, although it is an extremely late example of this style, having been built in 1900. Arrayed on Sullivan Street behind the rectory are the Colonial Revival convent (built 1916 and enlarged in 1930), and the former school (built in the 1920s), with a large parking area occupying much of the remainder of the property.

St. Andre's was founded as Biddeford's third Catholic church, after St. Mary's and St. Joseph's. St. Mary's was founded in 1855 to support a large immigrant Irish community and St. Joseph's was established in 1860 to support the growing French-Canadian immigrant population. The latter population continued to grow and, by the 1890s, had outgrown its facilities. St. Andre's was founded in 1899 and was located in the heart of what was then a French Canadian neighborhood, with Rev. Louis Bergeron as its priest. The basement of the church was built in 1900 and services were held there until the church building was completed in 1910. The school operated until the early 1990s, and was converted into housing in 1998. The church continued to serve the Good Shepherd Parish community until it was formally closed with a final mass on New Year's Eve, 2010.

== See also ==
- National Register of Historic Places listings in York County, Maine
