= Timothy G. O'Connell =

American architect

- Born: 1868; Fort Dodge, Iowa, United States
- Died: June 7, 1955; Venice, Florida, United States
- Occupation: Architect
- Practice: Chickering & O'Connell; Timothy G. O'Connell; O'Connell & Shaw

St. Mary's Catholic Church in Stamford, Connecticut, designed by O'Connell & Shaw in the Gothic Revival style and completed in 1928

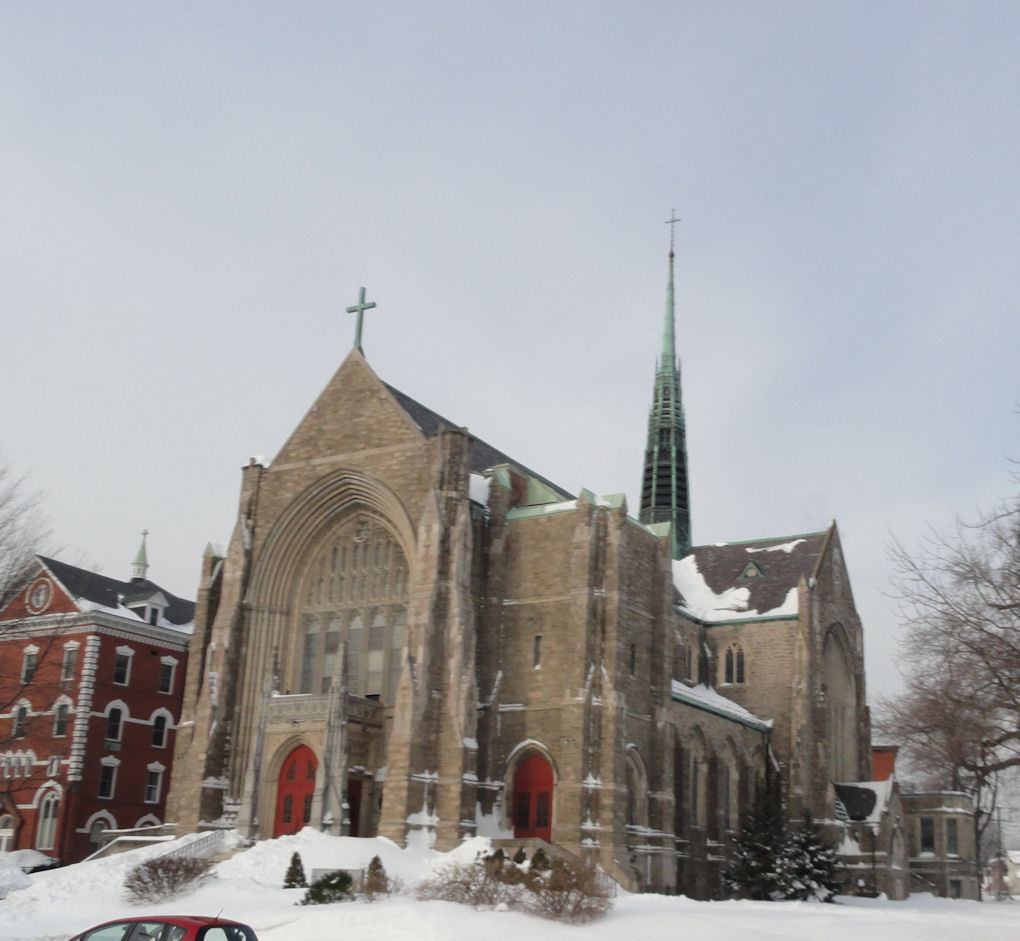
Our Lady of Sorrows Catholic Church in Hartford, Connecticut, designed by O'Connell & Shaw in the Gothic Revival style and completed in 1925

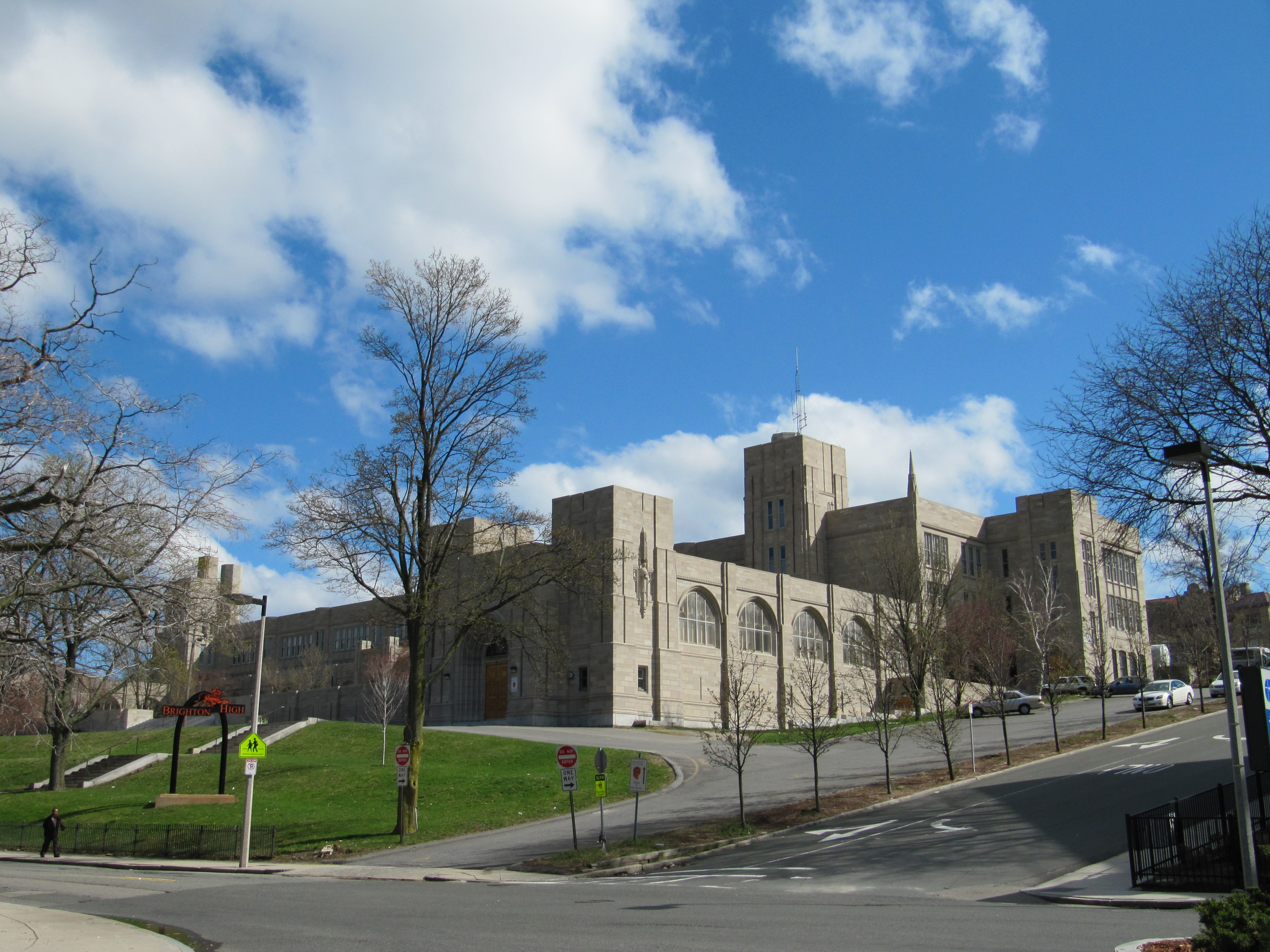
Brighton High School, designed by O'Connell & Shaw in the Collegiate Gothic style and completed in 1930

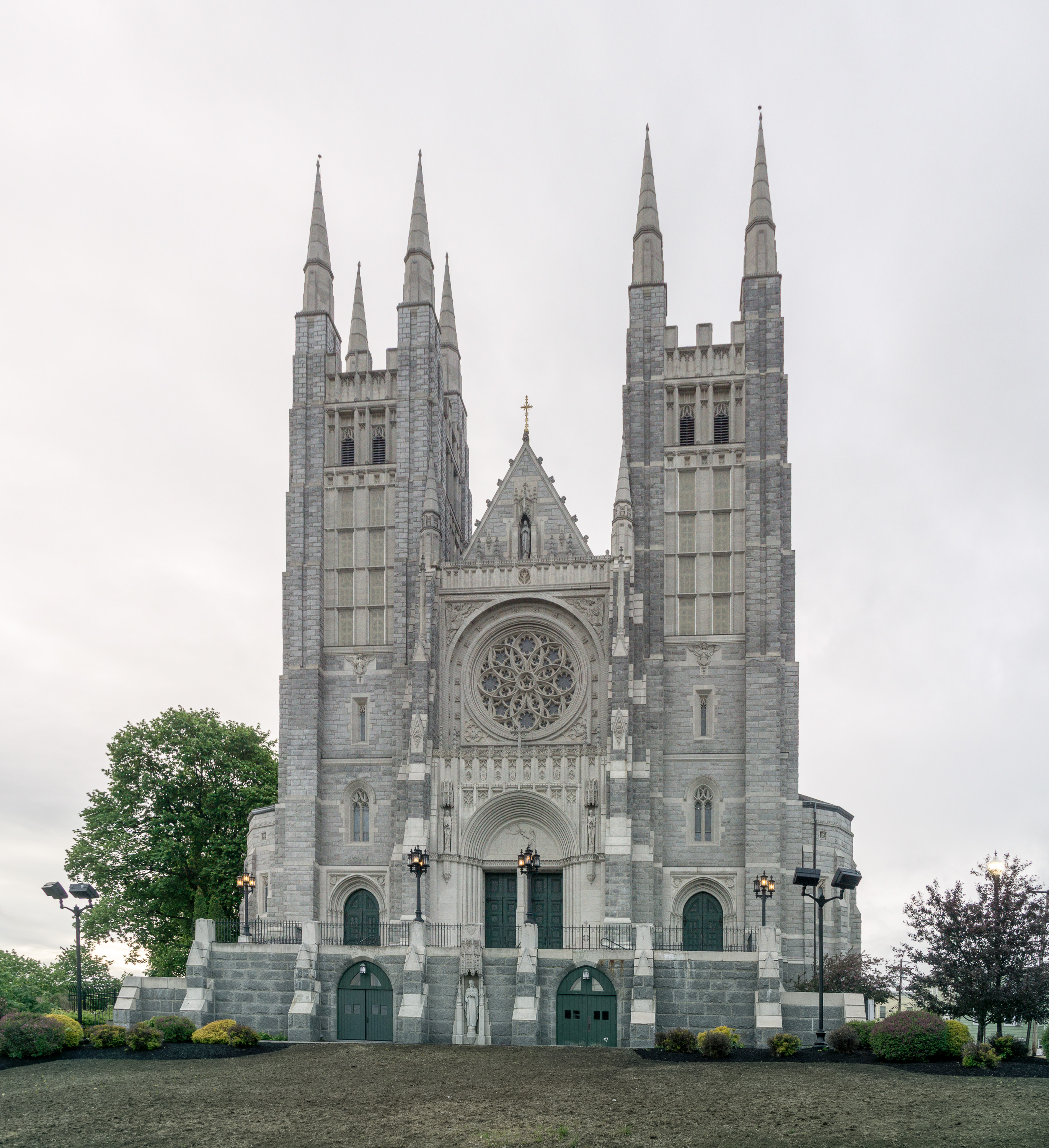
The Basilica of Saints Peter and Paul in Lewiston, Maine, designed by O'Connell in the Gothic Revival style and completed in 1938

Timothy G. O’Connell (1868 – June 7, 1955) was an American architect whose Boston-based practice specialized in ecclesiastical design. He is reputed to have produced some 600 civic and religious buildings, culminating in the Basilica of Saints Peter and Paul (1938) in Lewiston, Maine.

== Childhood and education ==
According to his daughter, O'Connell took pains to keep his life private, to the point of destroying his office records upon his retirement. Because of this, little biographical information is definitely known.

Timothy George O'Connell, known variously as T. George O'Connell and as Timothy G. O'Connell, was born in Fort Dodge, Iowa, in 1868, to parents from Newburyport, Massachusetts. Two years later his family returned to Newburyport, where he attended public grammar school and the Immaculate Conception High School. He was encouraged by his high school teacher to study architecture. His architectural training is unknown. At about the age of 22 he completed his first building, an unidentified church in Twin Mountain, New Hampshire, possibly St. Margaret's Catholic Church (1890, burned 1914).

== Architectural practice ==
In 1894 O'Connell formed the partnership of Chickering & O'Connell, architects, with George W. Chickering. Chickering's architectural training had been in the office of architect C. Willis Damon in Haverhill, very near Newburyport. This firm at first had its office in Springfield, Massachusetts. For several years they managed at second office in Manchester, New Hampshire, before consolidating their practice in Boston. As Chickering was Episcopalian while O'Connell was Catholic, they completed work for both denominations. At their busiest they employed up to 60 draftsmen.

In Connecticut, they designed St. Anne Catholic Church (1910 and 1922) in Waterbury and St. Stanislaus Catholic Church (1913) in New Haven; in Maine, the Town Hall (1900) in Old Orchard Beach, the former St. Joseph's Academy and Convent (1909, NRHP-listed) in Portland, St. Andre's Catholic Church (1910, NRHP-listed) in Biddeford and St. David Catholic Church (1911, NRHP-listed) in Madawaska; in Massachusetts, the Academie Brochu (1899, NRHP-listed) in Northbridge; and in New Hampshire, the former St. Francis Xavier Catholic Church (1898), now St. Mary and Archangel Michael Coptic Orthodox Church, in Nashua and the former St. George's Catholic School (1898, NRHP-listed) in Manchester.

In 1912 O'Connell and Chickering dissolved their partnership and each continued to practice independently. O'Connell continued to focus on ecclesiastical design, his works including the former St. Louis Catholic Church (1915) in Auburn, Maine, and Sts. Cyril and Methodius Catholic Church (1916, NRHP-listed) in Hartford, Connecticut. In 1917, during the first administration of four-time Boston mayor James Michael Curley, he was awarded the contract to design the West Roxbury Municipal Courthouse (1923). In 1919 he formed a second partnership, O'Connell & Shaw, with Richard J. Shaw. Shaw was later referred to by the Boston Globe as a "close friend" of Curley. They were jointly responsible for the West Roxbury courthouse, which had been delayed by World War I, and were awarded many major projects by the second Curley administration, culminating in their Collegiate Gothic design for the Brighton High School (1930). They dissolved their partnership later that year.

The exceptional parish church completed by O'Connell & Shaw is St. Mary's (1928, NRHP-listed) in Stamford, Connecticut. Bridgeport architect Robert Mutrux describes it as "[serene], almost [disdainful] above its low-rise surroundings, recalling the typical French...church-dominated villages...[a] grand finale of the Revival Period." They also designed, in Connecticut, St. Mary's Catholic Church (1922) in Norwich and Our Lady of Sorrows Catholic Church (1925) in Hartford; in Maine, St. Mary's Catholic Church (1927, NRHP-listed) in Augusta, the former St. Mary's Catholic Church (1927) in Lewiston, John Bapst Memorial High School (1928) in Bangor, Sacred Heart Catholic Church (1929) in Yarmouth and the former Sacred Heart Catholic Church (1930) in Waterville; and in Massachusetts, St. Andrew's Catholic Church (1921) in North Billerica, the former St. Andrew the Apostle Catholic Church (1924) in Jamaica Plain, St. Mary's Italian Catholic Church (1925) in Salem and the former St. Polycarp's Catholic Church (1933) in Somerville. In 1930, their Immaculate Conception Catholic Church and Convent (1927, demolished) in Malden was recipient of the Harleston Parker Medal, given by the Boston Society of Architects for outstanding architectural work in the greater Boston community.

In the last years of their partnership O'Connell, as an individual, was tentatively retained as architect for the Basilica of Saints Peter and Paul (1938, NRHP-listed) in Lewiston, Maine. He was not formally awarded the contract until 1933 and construction began in 1934. This church, later elevated to basilica status, was planned with the idea in mind that a second diocese might be established in Maine with its seat in Lewiston. The resulting building, with a design derived from English and Norman cathedrals, is the second-largest church in New England. Little is known about his work after the basilica; two are the rectory (1943) of Mary Immaculate of Lourdes Catholic Church in Newton and St. Pius V Catholic Church (1949) in Lynn, Massachusetts, completed when he was eighty years old. He closed his office and retired in the 1950s.

== Personal life and death ==
In 1921 O'Connell was married to Alice Ernestine Barry, a graduate of Boston University (BU). During his active career they lived in Newton, moving to Venice, Florida, in 1952 after his retirement. He was a member of the American Institute of Architects and the Boston Society of Architects. He died June 7, 1955, in Venice at the age of 85.

== Legacy ==
O'Connell was a prolific architect, producing some 600 civic and religious buildings throughout New England. Most of his churches and other buildings were designed in variants of the Gothic Revival, though he also drew on other revival styles eclectically, including the Neoclassical, Italian Renaissance and Spanish Colonial Revival styles. According to his biographer, John J. McAuliffe, "[t]he versatility demonstrated by Timothy O'Connell's work infers a person of great knowledge. He was...a person of sensitivity to those populations for which he designed buildings and a master craftsman who knew his work both from a technical point and as an art form" and that he "replace[d] Patrick C. Keely (1816-1896) as the most prolific architect of Catholic buildings in New England," placing him above even his better-known exact contemporary, the similarly prolific Charles Donagh Maginnis.

In 1961 O'Connell's widow established the T. George O’Connell, later the T. George and Ernestine O’Connell, Memorial Scholarship at BU for students showing “outstanding ability in the sciences.” After the death of their daughter, Ernestine, the scholarship fund was supplemented by a "bequest biggest of its type in BU history."
