= St. Stanislaus Parish (New Haven, Connecticut) =

Coordinates: 41°18′44″N 72°54′54.8″W

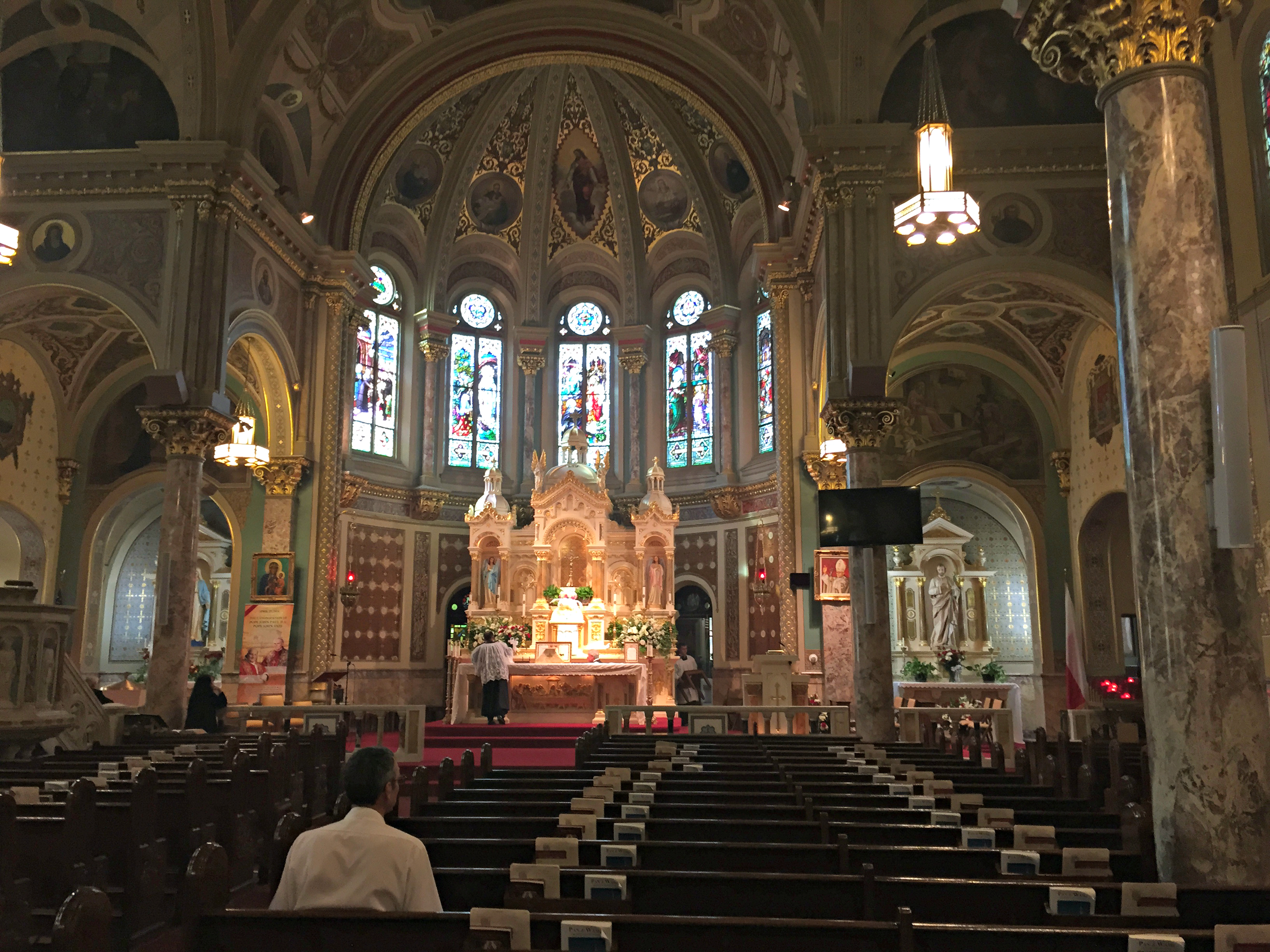
- St Stanislaus Church nave
- St. Stanislaus Parish
- Location: State Street (sanctuary); 9 Eld Street (office); New Haven, Connecticut
- Country: United States
- Denomination: Roman Catholic

History
- Founded: December 28, 1901
- Founder: Polish immigrants
- Dedication: St. Stanislaus
- Dedicated: October 23, 1904

Administration
- Division: Vicariate: New Haven
- Province: Hartford
- Archdiocese: Hartford
- Parish: Congregation of the Mission

Clergy
- Archbishop: Most Rev. Leonard Paul Blair, D.D.
- Pastor(s): Fr. Ryan Lerner; Fr. Sebastian Kos (Administrator)

St. Stanislaus Parish (Polish: Parafia św. Stanisława Biskupa i Męczennika w New Haven), designated for Polish immigrants in New Haven, Connecticut, United States, was founded on December 28, 1901. It is one of the Polish-American Roman Catholic parishes in New England in the Archdiocese of Hartford.

== History ==
The parish had its beginnings in 1896 when the Polish immigrants from the city of New Haven came together to form the St. Stanislaus Society. This society became the nucleus for the future St. Stanislaus Parish. Initially the group gathered for Mass at a German Catholic Church in New Haven but in 1900, they began to make plans for a location of their own. A delegation from the St. Stanislaus Society petitioned Most Reverend Michael Tierney of the Hartford Diocese for permission to organize a parish. Bishop Tierney agreed and appointed Reverent Stanislaus Musiel to be pastor of the rising parish.

Father Musiel celebrated the first Mass for the newly founded parish in a German hall on Wooster Street. A year later, in 1901, the pastor purchased a home and grocery store on Dwight Street and had it converted to a chapel.

In 1903, the Bishop entrusted the new parish to the Polish Vincentian Fathers and Reverend George Glogowski, CM, became the pastor. The Vincentians began their stewardship of the parish by offering a popular mission. The mission was a great spiritual experience for those who attended. The mission also revealed that the number of Polish immigrants in New Haven was far greater than expected. Their original chapel on Dwight Street would not be adequate to accommodate the numbers.

The pastor, Father Glogowski, bought an old Swedish church with two houses on St. John Street. The church was large enough to accommodate the growing numbers of parishioners but it also supplied a rectory for the priests. The church was renovated and a steeple was added. Most Reverend Michael Tierney, Bishop of Hartford, dedicated the church on Decoration Day in 1905 and placed it under the patronage of St. Stanislaus.

In 1907 Reverend Anthony Mazurkiewicz, CM, became pastor. During his years as pastor, Father Mazurkiewicz eliminated the parish debt and opened a parochial school for the parish children in the basement of the Church.

The parish continued to grow rapidly and by 1910 it was evident that they had outgrown both the church and the parish school. Father Mazurkiewicz began to look for a property that would be more centrally located in the city of New Haven. He found an abandoned church on the corner of State and Eld Streets, the present location of St. Stanislaus Parish.

By 1911, the property was cleared and the foundation for the present church was laid. On Decoration Day in 1912, Most Reverent John Joseph Nilan, Bishop of Hartford, blessed the cornerstone of the new church, designed in the Polish Cathedral style. Just a year later, on April 27, 1913, the first Mass was said in the new church. A solemn Mass of dedication was celebrated by Bishop Nilan on May 30, 1913.

The church was designed by Chickering & O'Connell, Boston architects.

The parochial school was moved to the basement of the church where it remained for the next nine years. The parish also quickly acquired the adjacent lots and properties. In 1921, the parish demolished three houses on State Street in order to build a new school. It was completed in 1929.

The interior of the church has changed over the years. In 1925, the pastor, Reverend Joseph Janowski, CM, commissioned artist P. Mazur to paint the many frescoes on the interior of the church. Stained glass windows from Aachen, Germany were installed in 1926.

In 1942 the pastor, Reverend Karol Pacherski, CM, commissioned Vincent Murdo of New Haven to beautify the interior of the church. “The Christianization of Poland in the 10th Century,” was chosen as the theme. The renovations were completed in 1943. A blessing for the redecorated church was held on October 11, 1943. In 1972, the original organ was rebuilt. After the Second Vatican Council, a new altar was installed. The rendition of the Last Supper was moved from the high altar to the front of the new altar. The last major renovation in the church took place in anticipation of the 100 year anniversary of the parish by then pastor, Reverend Waclaw Hlond, CM.

On April 25, 1979, the New Haven Preservation Trust proclaimed the church building noteworthy for its distinguished interior.

In September 2009, a regularly scheduled traditional Latin mass hosted by the St. Gregory Society of New Haven was commenced. The Mass is celebrated every Sunday at 2:00 pm.

Sources: Fifty Year History, 1904-1954 and the article “Brief History of St. Stanislaus, B.M. Church,” from the 2013 Parish Directory.

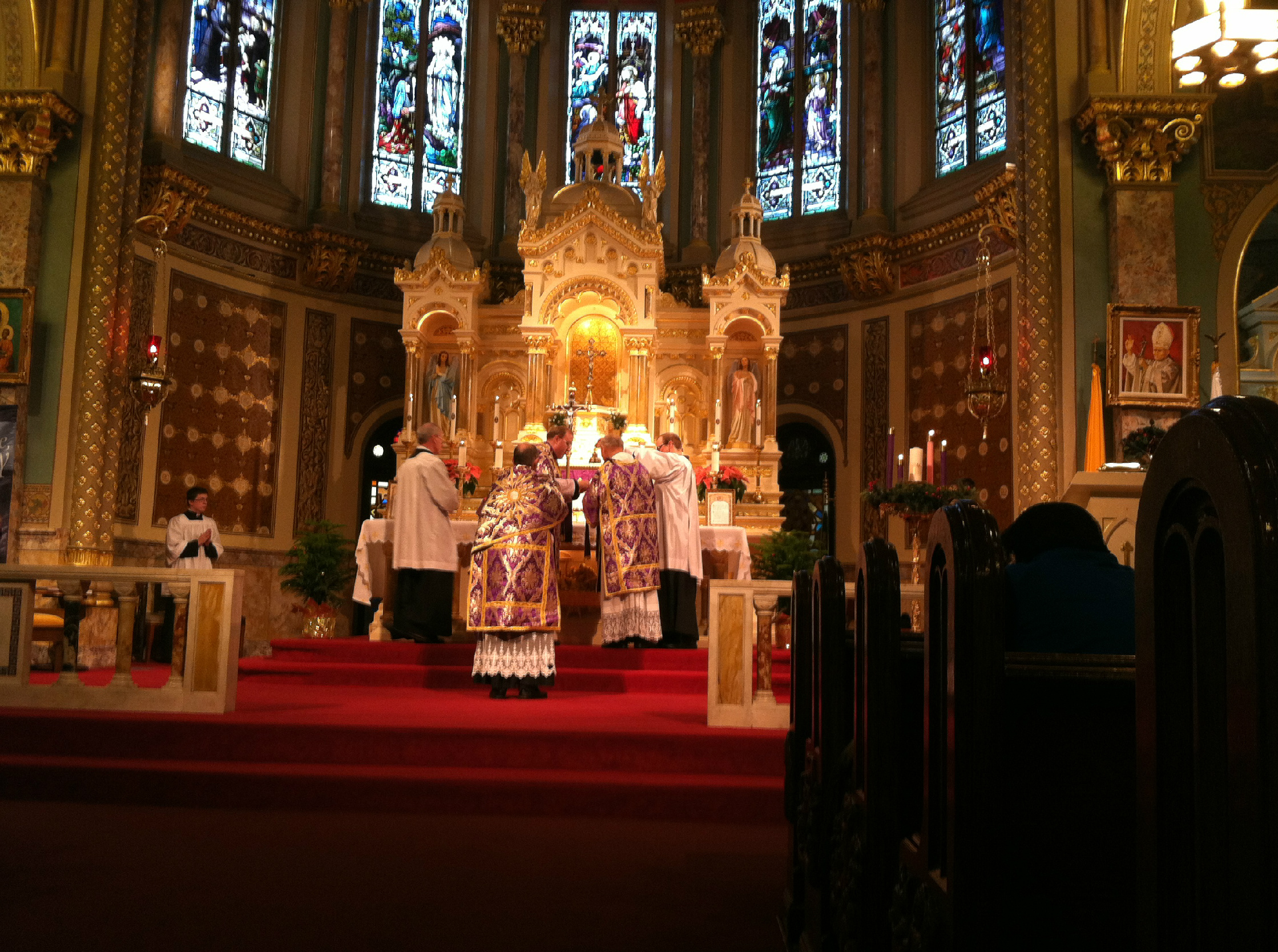
A Solemn High Mass in St. Stanislaus Church

== Restructuring of New Haven Parishes ==
In October 2021, Archbishop Leonard Paul Blair announced a major restructuring of parishes in New Haven into a municipal model parish, whereby all 10 churches in the city, including Saint Stanislaus, would be consolidated into single parish corporation administered on the premises of St. Mary Church. As part of the reorganization, the Vincentian Fathers left St. Stanislaus at the end of 2021, and diocesan priests were assigned to administer the parish. The newly appointed pastor of St. Mary Parish would guide the transition process and eventually become pastor of the consolidated city-wide parish. The St. Mary Priory building would house the pastor and associate priests appointed to serve the churches in New Haven. The formal consolidation is tentatively planned to occur in 2022 or 2023; all 10 church buildings in the city would remain open for Sunday mass in the initial phase of the consolidation.

== Bibliography ==
- The history of Saint Stanislaus Church, New Haven, Connecticut, 1901-1976. New Haven, CT: St. Stanislaus Parish. 1976.
- The 150th Anniversary of Polish-American Pastoral Ministry. Webster, Massachusetts: St. Joseph Basilica. September 11, 2005.
- The Apostolate with Polish Immigrants in the USA
- The Official Catholic Directory in USA
