= St. George's School and Convent =

- U.S. National Register of Historic Places
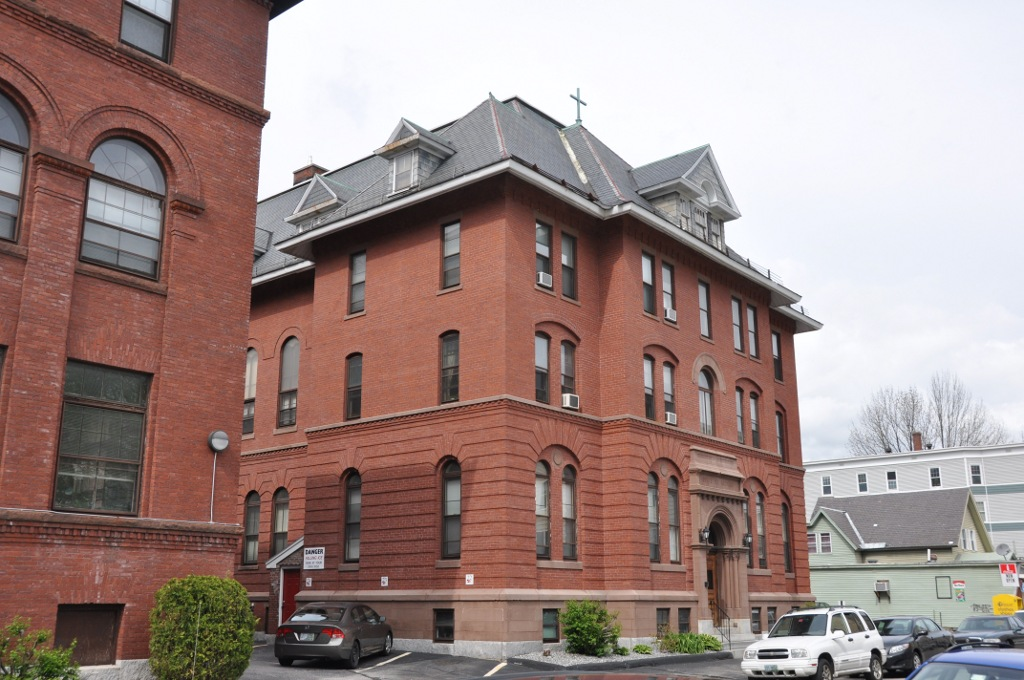

- Location within New Hampshire Location within the United States
- Location: 124 Orange St., Manchester, New Hampshire
- Coordinates: 42°59′49″N 71°27′36″W
- Area: 0.5 acres (0.20 ha)
- Built: 1898 and 1899
- Architectural style: Romanesque
- NRHP reference No.: 85002192
- Added to NRHP: September 12, 1985

St George's School and Convent are a historic Roman Catholic complex at 124 Orange Street in Manchester, New Hampshire, United States. Built in 1898–99, they are among the city's finest examples of Romanesque architecture, built to support its burgeoning French Canadian population. The school closed in 1970, after which time the buildings have been used to house social service agencies and act as a community center. The buildings were listed on the National Register of Historic Places in 1985.

== Description and history ==
The buildings of St. George's are located in a mainly residential area northeast of downtown Manchester, at the northeast corner of Pine and Orange Streets. The complex's former church, now occupied by a Protestant denomination, stands diagonally across Pine Street. The school and convent are a pair of connected three-story brick buildings, built out of red brick. The school is capped by a mansarded slate roof, and has paired windows set in either round-arch or segmented-arch surrounds on the first two floors. The convent has windows arranged in two-story round-arch panels on the lower floors and in simple rectangular openings on the third floor, which is separated from the lower floors by a stringcourse.

The school and convent were constructed in 1898 and 1899, respectively, along with the church, to serve the large French Canadian community that had migrated south from Quebec to work at the Amoskeag Mills, the city's largest employer. The complex is the city's only surviving Catholic facility of the period on the east side of the Merrimack River, and is one of its best examples of Romanesque architecture. The two buildings are connected by a brick connector constructed in 1915 when the convent was converted for academic use. In addition to its academic uses, it also served as a community center, hosting social events. This function continued even after the school closed in 1970 due to declining enrollment.

The school was designed by Chickering & O'Connell, Springfield architects with a second office in Manchester.

== See also ==
- National Register of Historic Places listings in Hillsborough County, New Hampshire
