= St. Mary's Church (Stamford, Connecticut) =

Historic church in Connecticut, United States

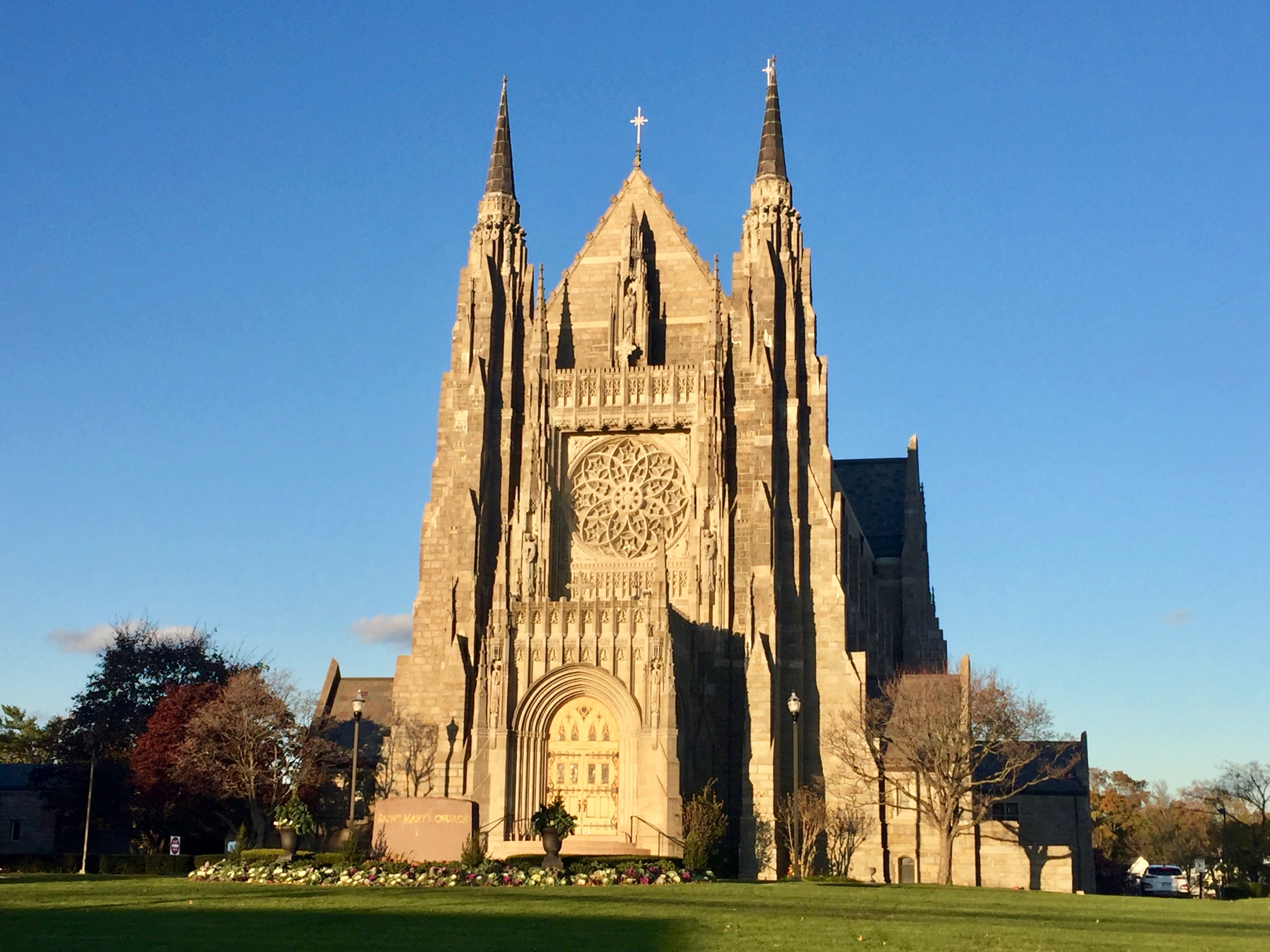
- St. Mary's Church
- Location: Stamford, Connecticut
- Country: United States
- Denomination: Catholic
- Website: stmarystfd.org/index.php

History
- Status: Active
- Founded: Original Foundation, 1907. Newly incorporated as a parish, May 1, 2020
- Founder(s): First Pastor of original foundation, Monsignor Dennis L. Gleason. First Pastor of new foundation, Rev. Gustavo A. Falla
- Dedication: Dedicated in 1928 to The Virgin Mary
- Events: St. Mary's Carnival

Architecture
- Heritage designation: Cathedral
- Architect: O'Connell & Shaw
- Architectural type: French Neo Gothic

Administration
- Archdiocese: Hartford
- Diocese: Bridgeport

Clergy
- Bishop: The Most Rev. Frank J. Caggiano
- Priest: Rev. Fr.Juan Gabriel Acosta
- St. Mary's Church
- U.S. National Register of Historic Places
- Location within Connecticut Location within the United States
- Location: 566 Elm Street, Stamford, Connecticut
- Coordinates: 41°3′1″N 73°31′54″W
- Area: Six acres
- Built: 1928
- Architectural style: Late Gothic Revival, Italianate
- MPS: Downtown Stamford Ecclesiastical Complexes TR
- NRHP reference No.: 87002123
- Added to NRHP: December 24, 1987

St. Mary's is a cathedral-style church located at 566 Elm Street in Stamford, Connecticut. It is part of the Roman Catholic Diocese of Bridgeport.

== Architecture and history ==
The main building is a Gothic Revival structure, designed by Boston architects O'Connell & Shaw and completed in 1928. It is an elegant example of French Gothic architecture, notable for the large rose window in the front-facing gable end.

The rectory is a c. 1860 Italianate villa, originally built for a member of the locally prominent Wardwell family. Francis L. S. Mayers, a Stamford resident and successor to the practice of Bertram Grosvenor Goodhue, designed the now-demolished parish school. He has incorrectly also been given credit for the design of the church.

The complex was added to the National Register of Historic Places in 1987.

== St. Mary's Convent ==
The St. Mary's Convent is now the Monsignor McDermott Parish Center.

== See also ==
- National Register of Historic Places listings in Stamford, Connecticut
