= St. David Catholic Church =

Historic church in Maine, United States

- U.S. National Register of Historic Places
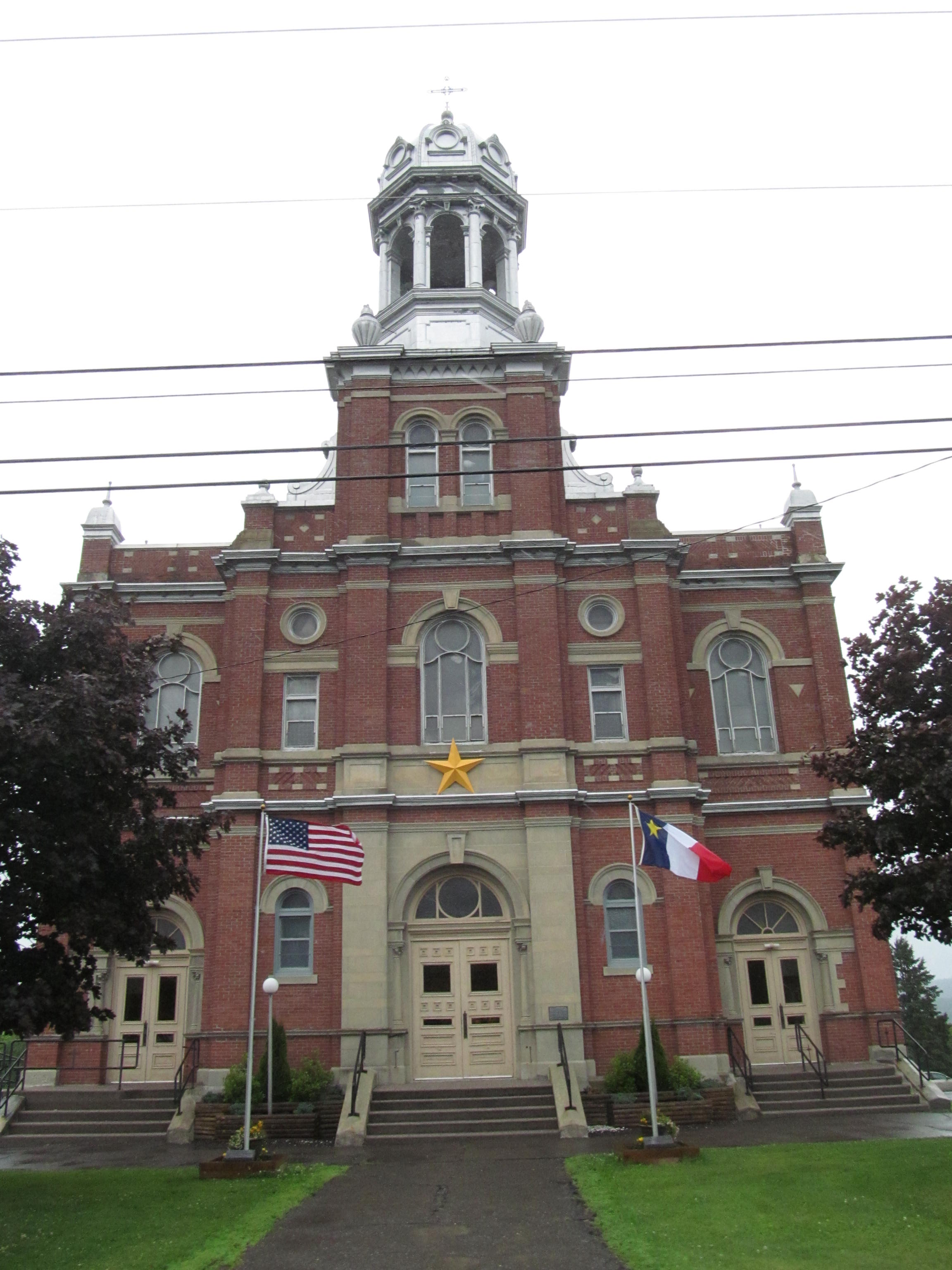

- Location within Maine Location within the United States
- Nearest city: Madawaska, Maine
- Coordinates: 47°20′57″N 68°16′39″W
- Area: 1 acre (0.40 ha)
- Built: 1911
- Architect: Chickering & O'Connell revival
- Architectural style: Baroque revival, Italian Renaissance revival architecture
- NRHP reference No.: 73000101
- Added to NRHP: October 02, 1973

St. David Catholic Church is a historic church at 774 Main Street (United States Route 1) in Madawaska, Maine. Built in 1911, it is an architecturally distinctive blend of Baroque revival and Italian Renaissance revival architecture. The congregation was the first separate Roman Catholic congregation established in Madawaska, the result of many years' struggle, after the international border divided the French Catholic community here in 1842. The building was listed on the National Register of Historic Places in 1973.

== Description and history ==
St. David Catholic Church is set on the north side of US Route 1, between the road and the Saint John River. Its location is not far from the first landing site of the first French Acadians to arrive in the area in 1785. It is a large edifice, with a two-story facade with a central tower, and a large sanctuary behind, set on a stone foundation. The building is brick, with stone and wooden trim elements. The side walls of the sanctuary are divided into bays articulated by pilasters, with lancet-arched windows. The main facade is divided into five bays, the central three projecting. As on the sides, the bays are articulated by pilasters. There are three entrances, one at the center and two at the outer bays. All are set in round-arch openings, that in the center a more elaborate stone-trimmed setting. The second story repeats the arrangement of arched openings, with the bays flanking the center having sash windows with oriel windows above. A third level above the center bay begins the tower, which continues with an open octagonal belfry that has Corinthian columns supporting keystone arches.

The parish of St. David was established in the Diocese of Portland in 1871, after many years of petition by local French Catholics. The area had been disputed territory between Maine and neighboring New Brunswick, and the 1842 Webster-Ashburton Treaty, which set the border on the Saint John River, divided the community. The Catholic population remained part of the Diocese of New Brunswick, but difficulties attending services in Canada, and the unwillingness of diocesan leaders to deal with Maine authorities prompted the drive for division, which was granted by papal decree in 1870. The parish's first church was completed in 1872; this larger church built in 1911–12 to a design by Chickering & O'Connell of Boston, and was dedicated in 1913.

== See also ==
- National Register of Historic Places listings in Aroostook County, Maine
