= Mary Star of the Sea Church, Grand Case =

Coordinates: 18.1011°N 63.0571°W

Mary Star of the Sea Church
- Église de Marie Etoile de la Mer
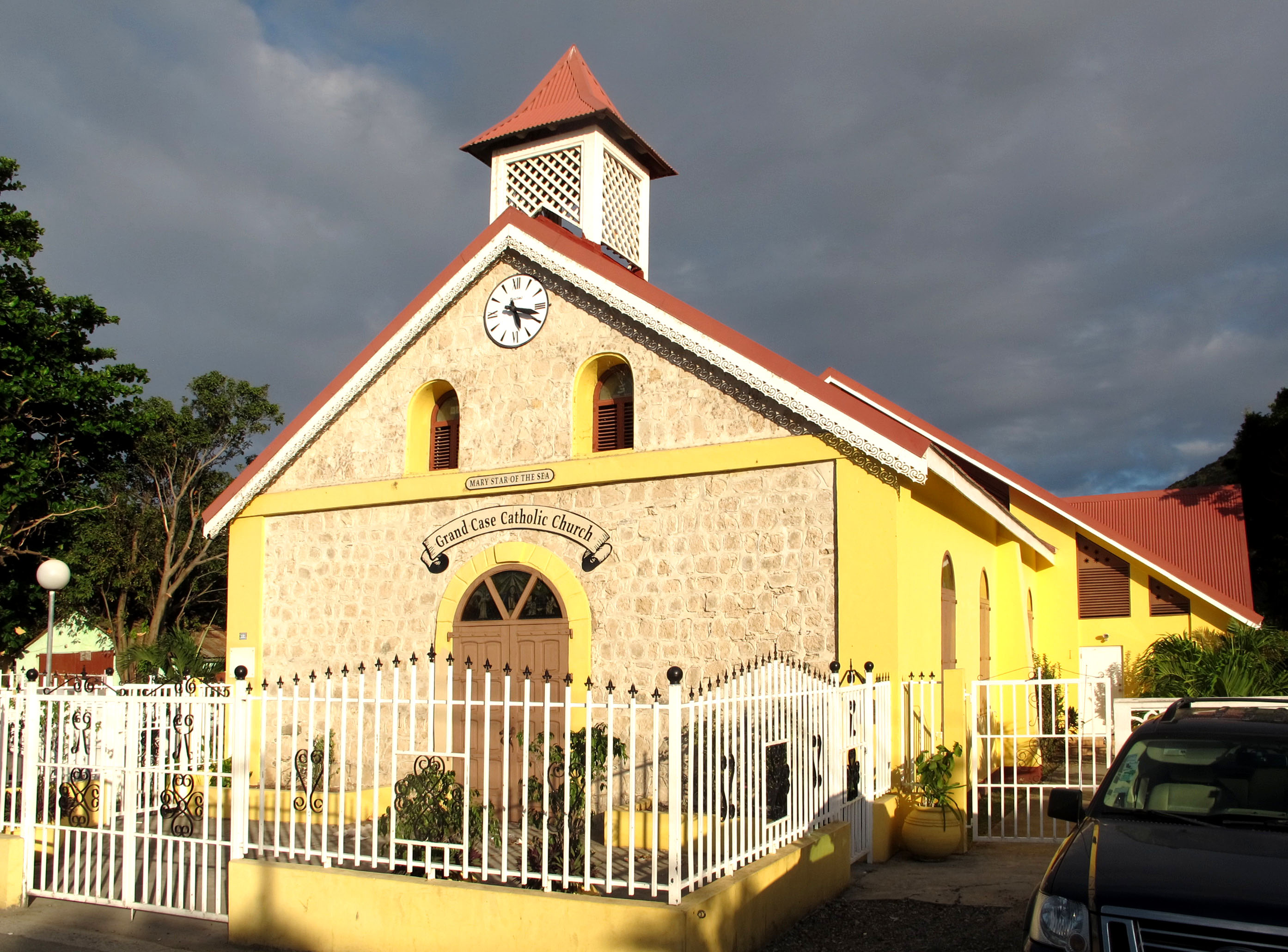
- Mary Star of the Sea Church
- Location: Grand Case; Saint Martin
- Country: France
- Denomination: Roman Catholic Church

Mary Star of the Sea Church or Grand Case Catholic Church (French: Église de Marie Etoile de la Mer; Eglise catholique à Grand Case) is a religious building affiliated to the Catholic Church located in Grand Case in the territorial collectivity of Saint Martin, a dependent territory of France that consists of the north half of the island of Saint Martin in the lesser Antilles. It should not be confused with the catholic church of the same name but located in the Dutch sector of the island.

The temple follows the Roman or Latin rite, and is a dependant of the Diocese of Basse-Terre (Dioecesis Imae Telluris et Petrirostrensis or Diocèse de Basse-Terre et Pointe-à-Pitre) which was created in 1850 by Pope Pius IX and has its seat in the island of Guadalupe, which until 2007 parented all the French territory of the Island of San Martin. Its construction began in parallel to the Catholic Church of Marigot (dedicated to Saint Martin of Tours) in the 1940s.

As its name suggests it is dedicated to Saint Mary the mother of God in her invocation of Mary Star of the Sea (Latin: Stella Maris).

== See also ==
- Roman Catholicism in France

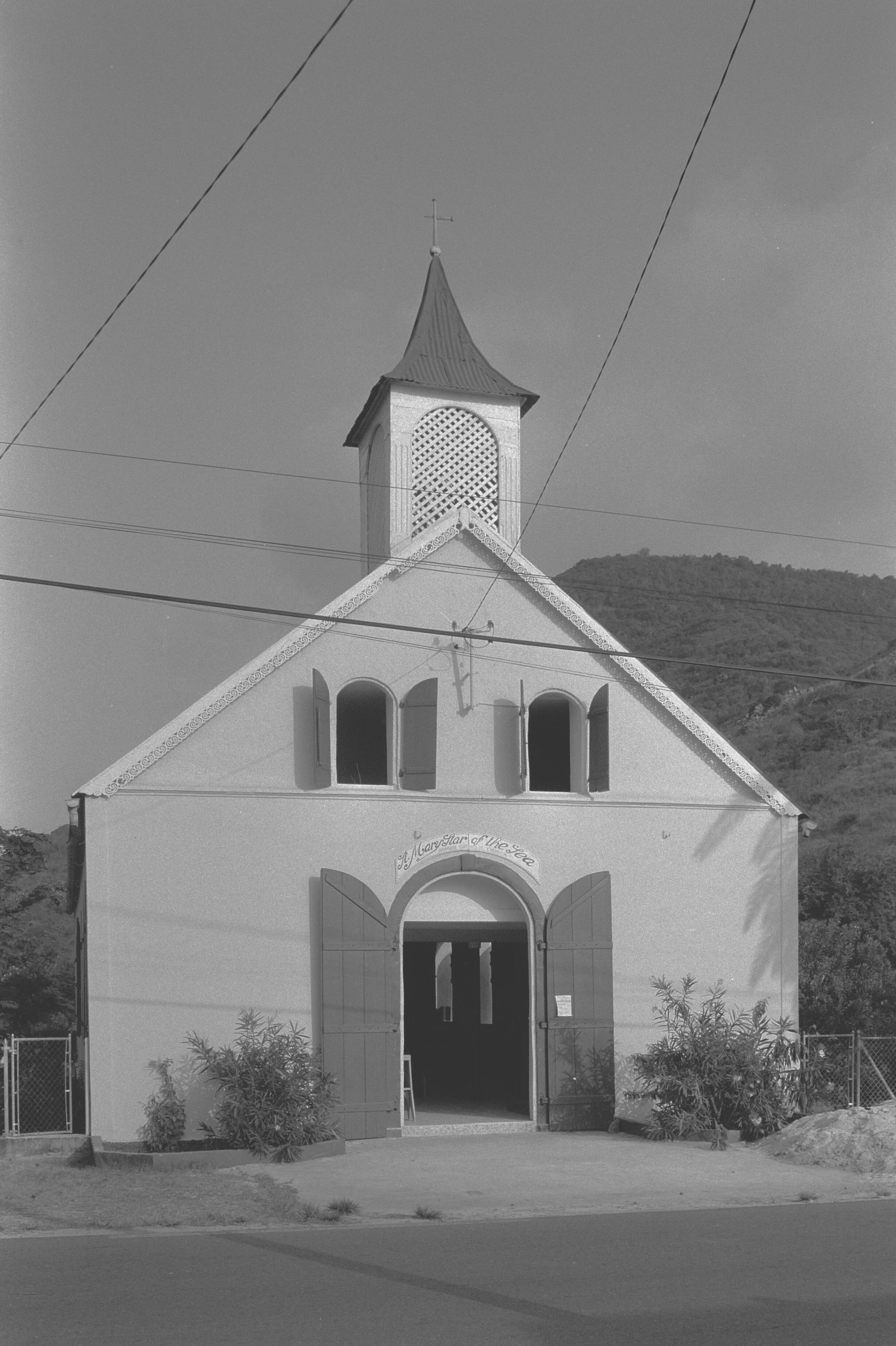
The church in 1982
