= Mary Star of the Sea =

Mary Star of the Sea may refer to:

- Our Lady, Star of the Sea, an ancient title for the Virgin Mary
- Mary Star of the Sea (album), by the musical group Zwan.
- Our Lady Star of the Sea Church (disambiguation), or variations

== See also ==
- Star of the Sea (disambiguation)
