= St. Mary's Church (Augusta, Maine) =

Historic church in Maine, United States

- U.S. National Register of Historic Places
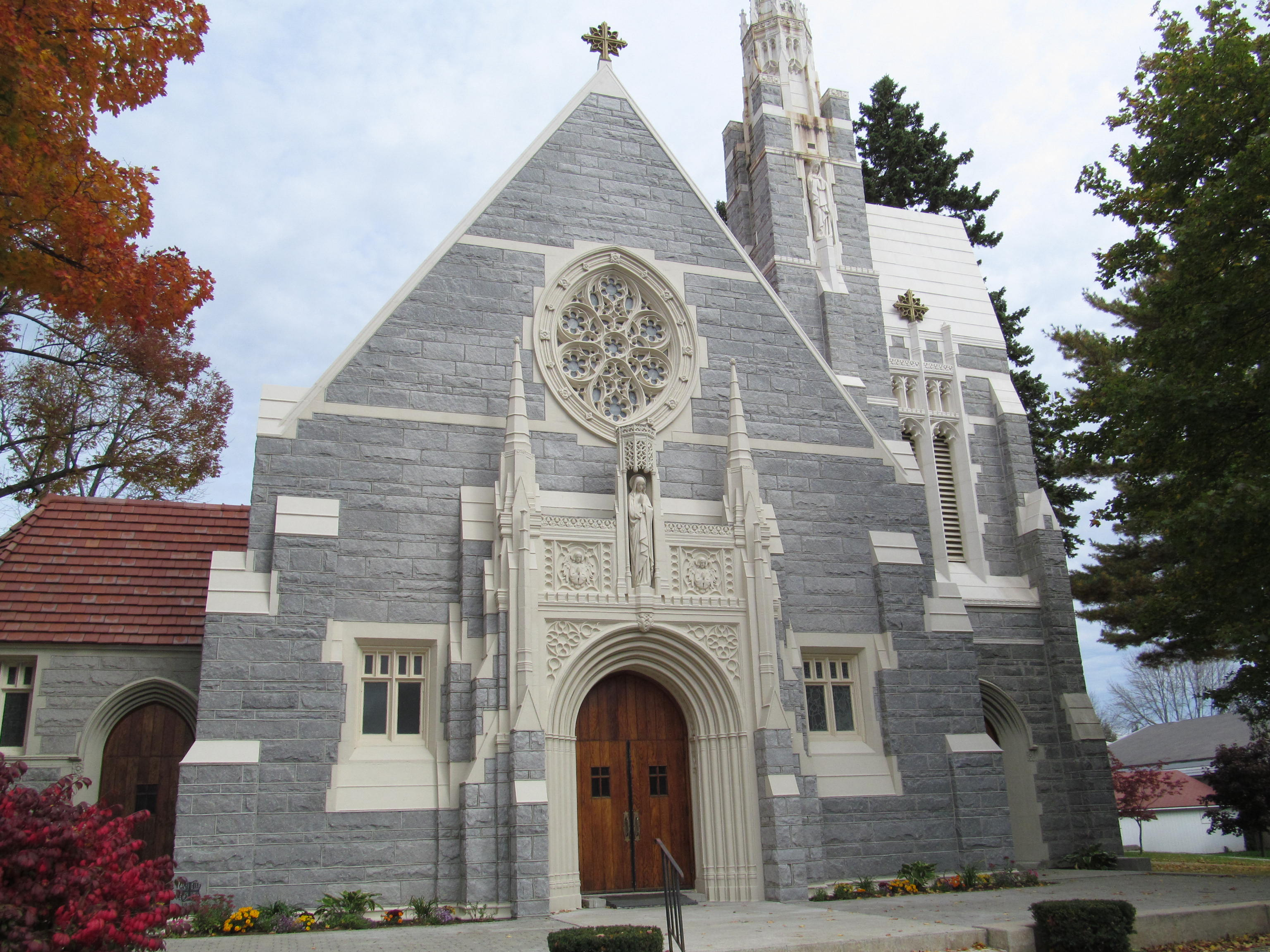

- Location within Maine Location within the United States
- Location: 41 Western Ave., Augusta, Maine
- Coordinates: 44°18′42″N 69°47′3″W
- Area: less than one acre
- Built: 1926
- Built by: Louis Milo Co.
- Architect: O'Connell & Shaw
- Architectural style: Gothic Revival
- NRHP reference No.: 87000943
- Added to NRHP: June 12, 1987

St. Mary's Church is a Catholic church at 41 Western Avenue in Augusta, Maine. It is under the Diocese of Portland. Built in 1926, it is one of the city's finest examples of Gothic Revival architecture. It was listed on the National Register of Historic Places in 1987.

== Description and history ==
St. Mary's Church stands on the north side of Western Avenue, southwest of Augusta's downtown and north of the state capitol complex. It is a single-story masonry structure, built out of ashlar granite. The long nave is oriented perpendicular to the street, with a steeply pitched gable roof. Set back from the front are side projections, a single-story entrance vestibule on the left, and the main tower on the right. The main entrance is at the center of the nave end, in an ornately decorated projecting Gothic-arch opening, with buttresses and pinnacles at the corners. The main tower is equally ornate, rising first to a gabled roof with a tall steeple above that. The interior has seen only minimal alteration since the building's construction.

The church was built in 1926-27 in order to handle growth in the city's Roman Catholic population. It was built as the third sanctuary for a parish established in 1830. It was designed by the Boston architectural firm of O'Connell & Shaw; Timothy G. O'Connell had by then a well-established reputation, with numerous commissions for Roman Catholic church and school edifices in Maine. St. Mary's was merged with four other congregations in 2007 to form a single large parish called St. Michael's; this continues to be used as one of that parish's churches.

== See also ==
- National Register of Historic Places listings in Kennebec County, Maine
