= Star of the Sea School =

Star of the Sea School may refer to the following Catholic schools:

== Australia ==
- Star of the Sea College, girls' secondary school in Brighton, Victoria
- Star of the Sea College, George Town, school in George Town, Tasmania
- Our Lady Star of the Sea Church & School, former school in Gladstone, Queensland
- St Mary's Star of the Sea Catholic School, school in Carnarvon, Western Australia

== Philippines ==
- Star of the Sea High School, high school in Tukuran, Zamboanga del Sur

== United States ==
- Mary Star of the Sea High School, high school in Los Angeles, California
- Our Lady Star of the Sea High School (Michigan), former girls' high school in Grosse Pointe Woods, Michigan
- Our Lady Star of the Sea School, former school in Cape May, New Jersey, see Cape May, New Jersey#History of education
- Our Lady Star of the Sea Regional School, elementary school in Atlantic City, New Jersey, see List of schools in the Roman Catholic Diocese of Camden#Elementary schools
- Mary Immaculate Star of the Sea School, Key West, Florida, see Key West#History
