= Holy Cross Church, Lewiston =

Coordinates: 44.0799°N 70.1932°W

Holy Cross Church Église Sainte-Croix (in French)
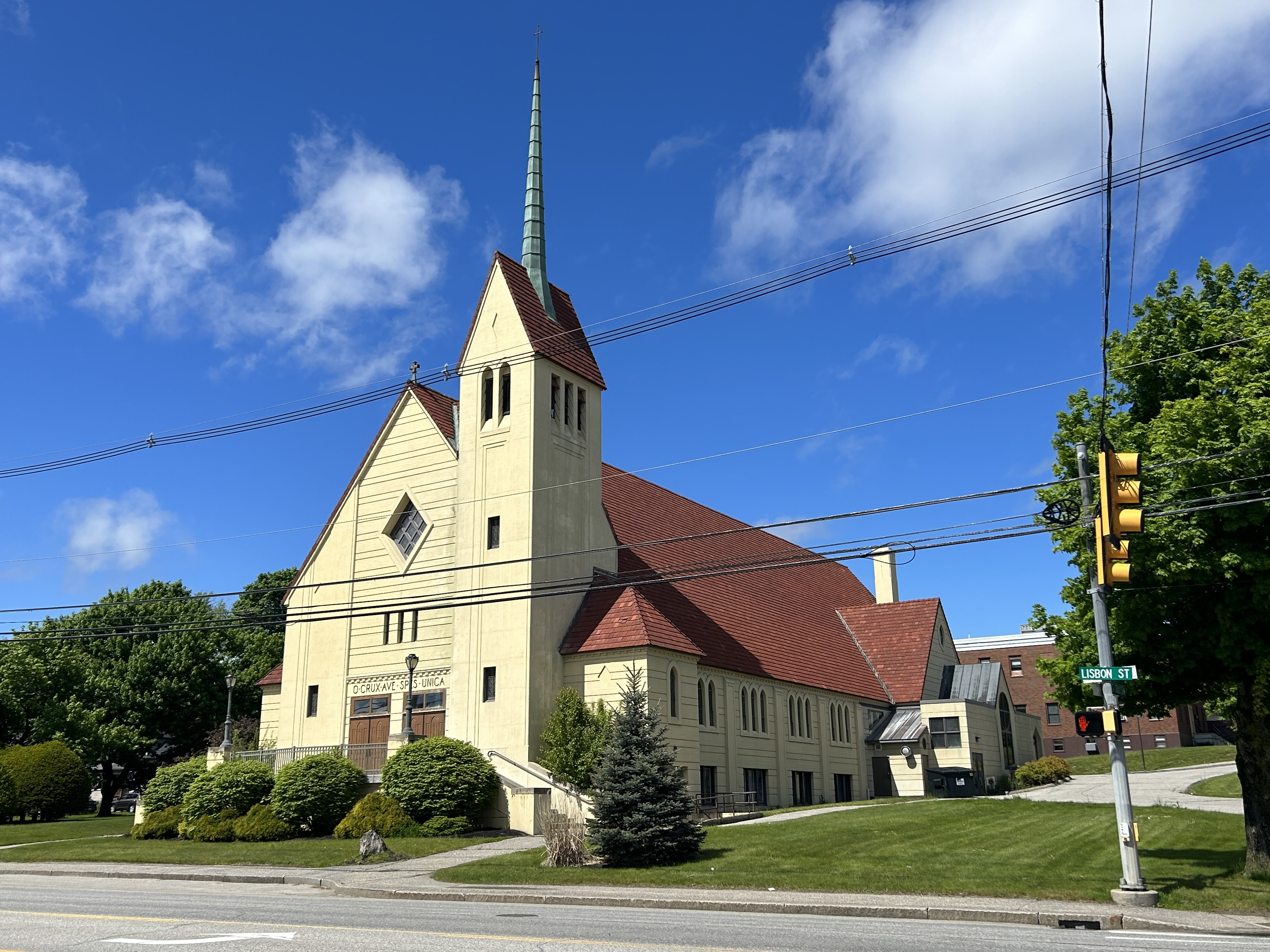
- Church (center), 2026.
- Interactive map of the Holy Cross Church; Église Sainte-Croix (in French) area

General information
- Architectural style: Baroque
- Location: Lewiston, Maine, United States
- Construction started: 1924
- Completed: 1926

Holy Cross Church (French: Église Sainte-Croix) was a church at 1080 Lisbon Street in Lewiston, Maine, United States, and was part of the Roman Catholic Diocese of Portland. The church held its final Mass on Sunday, June 29, 2025. Msgr. Rene Mathieu was the celebrant, alongside Pastor Daniel Greenleaf and many other priests.

== Building ==
Over the main door of the church is the motto O Crux ave, spes unica (Hail to the cross, our only hope) - a line from the ancient Latin hymn Vexilla Regis Prodeunt. The inside of the church is adorned with important statues, a wooden carved altar, and gold leaf wrought iron railings. The stained windows also depict important Catholic Saints, and each window was donated by a parishioner.

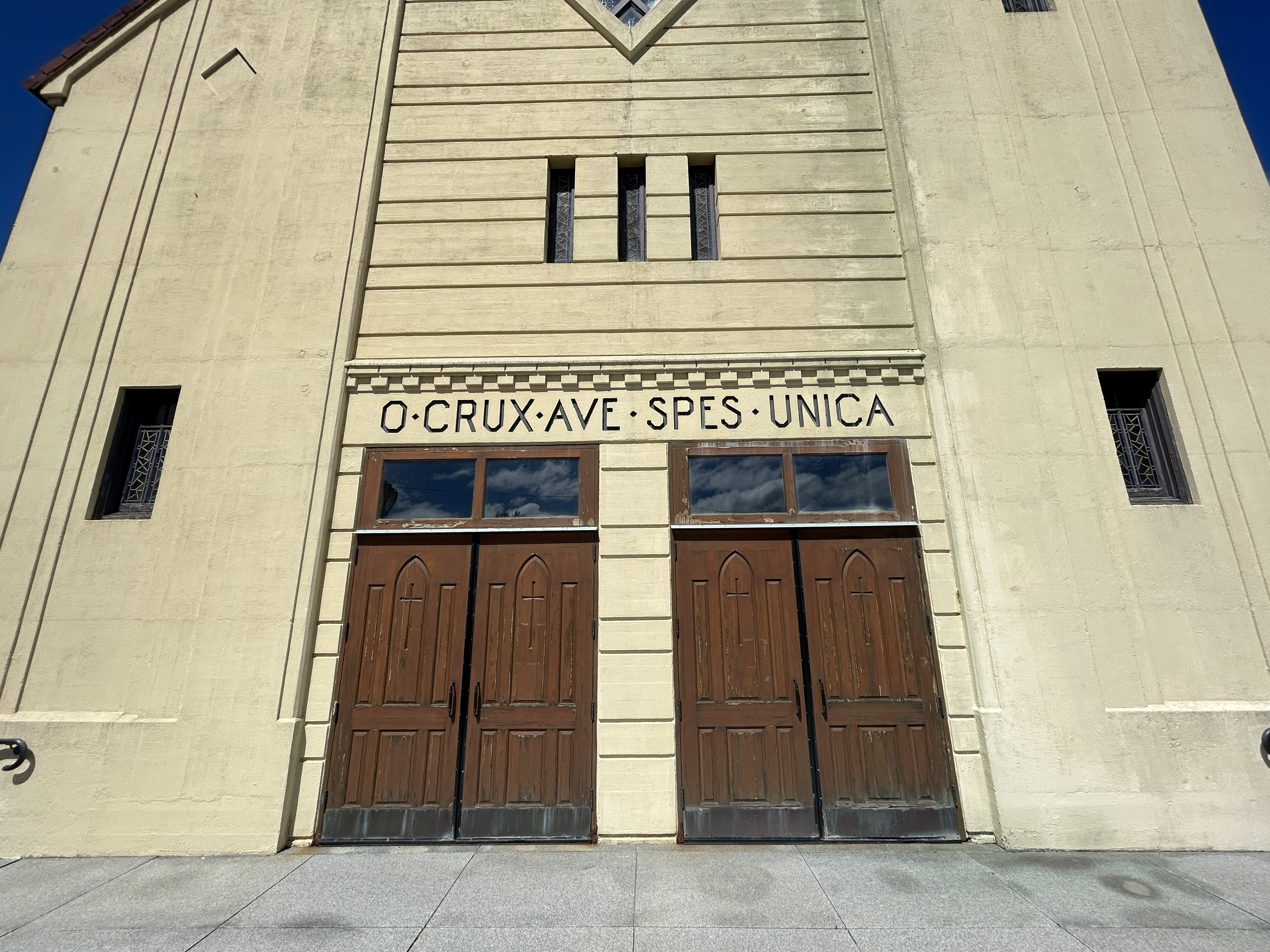
Inscriptions over the main doors

== History ==
The original church celebrated its first mass on September 14, 1924. The parishioners were largely of French Canadian heritage; after some early controversy over the name of the church, by 1926 the French name Église Sainte-Croix was adopted and the membership became almost entirely French American, as the Irish-American members joined St. Patrick's Church.

A new church was constructed after World War II, and an extensive renovation was completed in 1985.

Many marriages took place at Holy Cross Church and a recent book was written by Youville Labonté which relates to the genealogy involved.

The church held its final Mass on Sunday, June 29, 2025. Msgr. Rene Mathieu was the celebrant, alongside Pastor Daniel Greenleaf and many other priests.

== Facilities ==
The Catholic Church of Lewiston has a library of some 3,500 items.
