= Bridgewater =

Bridgewater or Bridgwater may refer to:

== Companies ==
- Bridgewater Associates, global investment manager
- Bridgewater Systems, Canadian software company

== Education ==
- Bridgewater College, Virginia, United States
- Bridgewater High School (disambiguation)
- Bridgewater State University, Massachusetts
- Bridgewater-Raynham Regional High School, Massachusetts, United States

== People ==
- Bridgewater (surname)
- Earl of Bridgewater and Duke of Bridgewater, English peerage

== Places ==
=== Australia ===
- Bridgewater, South Australia
- Bridgewater, Tasmania, suburb of Hobart
- Bridgewater On Loddon, Victoria
- Cape Bridgewater, Victoria, Australia

=== Canada ===
- Bridgewater, Nova Scotia

=== United Kingdom ===
- Bridgwater, town and civil parish in Somerset
  - Bridgwater (UK Parliament constituency) which existed from 1885 to 2010
  - Bridgwater and West Somerset (UK Parliament constituency), current constituency for this area
- RHS Garden Bridgewater, Greater Manchester
- Bridgewater, Banbridge, a development in County Down, Northern Ireland

=== United States ===
- Bridgewater, Connecticut
  - Bridgewater (CDP), Connecticut, census-designated place
- Bridgewater, Iowa
- Bridgewater, Maine
- Bridgewater, Massachusetts
  - Bridgewater (CDP), Massachusetts, census-designated place
  - Bridgewater (MBTA station)
- Bridgewater, Michigan, unincorporated community
- Bridgewater, New Hampshire
- Bridgewater Township, New Jersey, commonly referred to as "Bridgewater"
- Bridgewater, New York, a town
  - Bridgewater (CDP), New York, in the town of Bridgewater
- Bridgewater, New York (disambiguation)
- Bridgewater, Pennsylvania
- Bridgewater, South Dakota
- Bridgewater, Vermont
- Bridgewater, Virginia
- Bridgewater Township (disambiguation)
- Bridgewater Historic District (disambiguation)
- Bridgewater Center (disambiguation)

== Structures ==
- Bridgewater Bridge (disambiguation)
- Bridgewater Hall, a concert hall in Manchester
- Bridgewater House (disambiguation)
- Bridgewater Monument, Hertfordshire
- Bridgewater Place, Leeds
- Bridgewater State Hospital, Massachusetts, a hospital for the criminally insane, subject of the film Titicut Follies

== Transportation ==
- Bridgewater (East Indiaman), one of four East Indiamen of the British East India Company
- Bridgwater and Taunton Canal, Somerset, England
- Port of Bridgwater, Somerset, England
- Bridgewater Canal, from Preston Brook and Worsley to Manchester, England
- Bridgewater railway line, Adelaide, South Australia, Australia
- Bridgewater station (MBTA), in Bridgewater, Massachusetts, United States
- Bridgewater station (New York), in Bridgewater, New York, United States
- Bridgewater station (NJ Transit), in Bridgewater, New Jersey, United States
- HMS Bridgewater, the name of four ships of the Royal Navy, and one of the Commonwealth of England
