= Bridgewater, New York (disambiguation) =

Bridgewater is the name of both a town in New York State and a village within that town:

- Bridgewater (town), New York
- Bridgewater (village), New York.
