= List of divided U.S. Routes =

United States Numbered Highway System
- U.S. Highway shields for divided U.S. Routes

- Map of the present U.S. Highway network

System information
- Formed: November 11, 1926

Highway names
- US Highways: U.S. Highway nn (US nn); U.S. Route nn (US nn)

System links
- United States Numbered Highway System; List; Special; Divided

Some U.S. Routes are given directional suffixes to indicate a split of the main route — for instance, U.S. Route 25 (US 25) splits into US 25E (east) and US 25W (west) between Newport, Tennessee, and North Corbin, Kentucky, and US 9W is an alternate of U.S. Route 9 between Fort Lee, New Jersey, and Albany, New York. These splits were in the U.S. Highway system from the beginning, and were used when two roughly-equivalent routes existed. The American Association of State Highway and Transportation Officials (AASHTO) no longer assigns these numbers, and, in theory, current ones are to be eliminated "as rapidly as the State Highway Department and the Standing Committee on Highways can reach agreement". This policy was adopted by 1996; however, many of these routes still exist, mostly in Tennessee.

== List of routes ==
Number	Length (mi)	Length (km)	Southern or western terminus	Northern or eastern terminus	Formed	Removed	Notes
US 2N	—	—	Arvilla, North Dakota	Grand Forks, North Dakota	1931	1932	Replaced by US 2
US 2S	—	—	Arvilla, North Dakota	Grand Forks, North Dakota	1931	1932	Replaced by County Route 4
US 6N	—	—	Port Jervis, New York	Kingston, New York	1928	1933	Replaced by NY 279 / US 209
US 6N	—	—	Erie, Pennsylvania	Waterford, Pennsylvania	1931	1935	Replaced by PA 97
US 6N	27.84	44.80	West Springfield, Pennsylvania	West of Mill Village, Pennsylvania	1935	current	
US 9E	—	—	Fort Lee, New Jersey	Glens Falls, New York	1926	1930	Replaced by US 9 / Route 5
US 9W	141.83	228.25	Fort Lee, New Jersey	Albany, New York	1927	current	
US 9W	—	—	Keeseville, New York	Elizabethtown, New York	1928	1929	Replaced by NY 3 / NY 9W / NY 9N
US 10N	—	—	Moorhead, Minnesota	St. Cloud, Minnesota	1926	1934	Replaced by US 218 / US 10
US 10N	—	—	Garrison, Montana	Three Forks, Montana	1928	1960	Replaced by MT 287 / US 287 / US 12
US 10S	—	—	Moorhead, Minnesota	St. Cloud, Minnesota	1926	1934	Replaced by US 10 / US 52 / MN 27 / MN 153
US 10S	—	—	Garrison, Montana	Three Forks, Montana	1928	1960	Replaced by US 10 / MT 2 / I-90
US 11E	120.9	194.6	Knoxville, Tennessee	Bristol, Virginia	1929	current	
US 11W	111.2	179.0	Knoxville, Tennessee	Bristol, Virginia	1929	current	
US 19E	75.9	122.1	Near Burnsville, North Carolina	Bluff City, Tennessee	1930	current	
US 19W	62.9	101.2	Near Burnsville, North Carolina	Bluff City, Tennessee	1930	current	
US 20N	—	—	Bridgewater Center, Ohio	Busy Corners, Ohio	1931	1935	Replaced by SR 120 / SR 51 / US 20
US 20S	—	—	Bridgewater Center, Ohio	Busy Corners, Ohio	1933	1935	Replaced by US 20 / US 20 Alt. / SR 107 / SR 576
US 25E	—	—	Richmond, Kentucky	Newport, Kentucky	1926	1928	Replaced by US 27 / US 227 / KY 627
US 25E	112.7	181.4	Newport, Tennessee	North Corbin, Kentucky	1926	current	
US 25W	—	—	Richmond, Kentucky	Newport, Kentucky	1926	1928	Replaced by US 25
US 25W	145.7	234.5	Newport, Tennessee	North Corbin, Kentucky	1926	current	
US 26N	—	—	Bayard, Nebraska	Broadwater, Nebraska	1934	1959	Replaced by US 26 / US 385
US 30N	—	—	Burley, Idaho	Granger, Wyoming	1926	1972	Replaced by US 30
US 30N	—	—	Huntington, Oregon	Fruitland, Idaho	1926	1980	Replaced by US 95 / US-95 Spur / US 630
US 30N	—	—	Delphos, Ohio	Mansfield, Ohio	1932	1975	Replaced by US 30
US 30S	—	—	Burley, Idaho	Granger, Wyoming	1926	1972	Replaced by I-80 / I-84 (west) / US 89 / SR-30 / SR-42 / SH-81
US 30S	—	—	Ontario, Oregon	Nyssa, Oregon	1938	1940	Replaced by US 20 / US 26
US 30S	—	—	Delphos, Ohio	Mansfield, Ohio	1931	1975	Replaced by SR 430 / SR 309
US 30S	—	—	Fremont, Nebraska	Missouri Valley, Iowa	1931	1939	Replaced by US 75 / US 30 Alt. / Iowa 183 / US 6 / US 275 / N-130 / N-64
US 31E	190.9	307.2	Nashville, Tennessee	Louisville, Kentucky	1926	current	
US 31W	179.2	288.4	Nashville, Tennessee	Louisville, Kentucky	1926	current	
US 40N	—	—	Limon, Colorado	Manhattan, Kansas	1926	1935	Replaced by US 24 / K-194
US 40S	—	—	Grand Junction, Colorado	Manhattan, Kansas	1926	1935	Replaced by K-18 / US 40 / K-140 / SH 71 / US 24 / I-70
US 41E	—	—	Cass Station, Georgia	Chattanooga, Tennessee	1930	1933	Replaced by US 27 / US 411 / SR 20 / SR 293
US 41E	—	—	Hopkinsville, Kentucky	Nashville, Tennessee	1929	1943	Replaced by US 41
US 41E	—	—	Marietta, Georgia	Atlanta, Georgia	1948	1949	Replaced by US 41 / Hemphill Road
US 41W	—	—	Cass Station, Georgia	Chattanooga, Tennessee	1926	1934	Replaced by US 41
US 41W	—	—	Hopkinsville, Kentucky	Nashville, Tennessee	1929	1943	Replaced by US 43 / US 41A
US 45E	59.8	96.2	Three Way, Tennessee	South Fulton, Tennessee	1929	current	
US 45W	63.6	102.4	Three Way, Tennessee	South Fulton, Tennessee	1929	current	
US 49E	—	—	Brooklyn, Mississippi	Hattiesburg, Mississippi	1930	1936	Replaced by US 49
US 49E	85.862	138.181	Yazoo City, Mississippi	Tutwiler, Mississippi	1929	current	
US 49W	—	—	Brooklyn, Mississippi	Hattiesburg, Mississippi	1930	1936	Replaced by Old US 49 / Old US 49W
US 49W	80.986	130.334	Yazoo City, Mississippi	Tutwiler, Mississippi	1929	current	
US 50N	—	—	Garden City, Kansas	Baldwin City, Kansas	1926	1957	Replaced by US-56 / US-156 / K-156
US 50N	—	—	Athens, Ohio	Ellenboro, West Virginia	1929	1935	Replaced by US 50 Alternate / WV 16 / SR 7 / SR 550
US 50S	—	—	Garden City, Kansas	Baldwin City, Kansas	1926	1957	Replaced by US-59 / K-68 / US-75 / I-35 / US-50
US 50S	—	—	Athens, Ohio	Ellenboro, West Virginia	1929	1935	Replaced by WV 16 / WV 31 / US 50
US 67E	—	—	Arkadelphia, Arkansas	Donaldson, Arkansas	1931	1932	Replaced by AR 51
US 67E	—	—	North Little Rock, Arkansas	Rixey, Arkansas	1935	1960	Replaced by AR 161 / US 70 / US 165
US 67E	—	—	Morning Sun, Arkansas	Judsonia, Arkansas	1931	1949	Replaced by AR 87 / AR 11 / US 67
US 67W	—	—	Arkadelphia, Arkansas	Donaldson, Arkansas	1931	1932	Replaced by US 67
US 67W	—	—	North Little Rock, Arkansas	Rixey, Arkansas	1935	1960	Replaced by AR 107
US 67W	—	—	Morning Sun, Arkansas	Judsonia, Arkansas	1931	1949	Replaced by AR 385 / US 67C
US 70N	—	—	Nashville, Tennessee	Sparta, Tennessee	1929	1935	Replaced by US 70N / SR 26 / US 70
US 70N	—	—	Randlett, Oklahoma	Wilson, Oklahoma	1936	1938	Replaced by SH-76 / SH-53 / SH-5 / US-277
US 70N	87.5	140.8	Lebanon, Tennessee	Crossville, Tennessee	1939	current	
US 70S	—	—	Nashville, Tennessee	Sparta, Tennessee	1929	1935	Replaced by US 70 Alt. / US 70 / SR 1 / US 70S
US 70S	113.1	182.0	East of Pegram, Tennessee	Sparta, Tennessee	1939	current	
US 73E	—	—	Oswego, Kansas	Horton, Kansas	1926	1935	Replaced by US-73 / US-40 / US-69 / K-96
US 73E	—	—	Tekamah, Nebraska	Winnebago, Nebraska	1935	1957	Replaced by US 73 / US 75
US 73W	—	—	Oswego, Kansas	Horton, Kansas	1926	1935	Replaced by US-159 / US-59 / US-169 / K-146 / K-47 / US-400 / US-59
US 73W	—	—	Tekamah, Nebraska	Winnebago, Nebraska	1935	1957	Replaced by US 77 / N-32
US 78N	—	—	Heflin, Alabama	Villa Rica, Georgia	1926	1934	Replaced by US 78
US 78S	—	—	Heflin, Alabama	Villa Rica, Georgia	1926	1934	Replaced by US 78 Alternate / SR 61 / SR 166 / SR 46
US 80N	—	—	Abilene, Texas	Metcalf Gap, Texas	1931	1934	Replaced by Alt. US 80 / US 180 / SH 351
US 85E	—	—	Mule Creek Junction, Wyoming	Lead, South Dakota	1931	1937	Replaced by US 85 Alternate / US 18 / US 385
US 87E	—	—	Armington, Montana	Muddy Gap, Wyoming	1926	1939	Replaced by US 87 / MT 451 / WYO 196 / WYO 220
US 87W	—	—	Armington, Montana	Muddy Gap, Wyoming	1926	1935	Replaced by US 26 / US 89 / US 287 / WYO 138 / WYO 789
US 95E	—	—	Potlatch, Idaho	Coeur d'Alene, Idaho	1927	1935	Replaced by US-95 Alternate / I-90 / SH-97 / SH-3 / SH-6
US 95W	—	—	Potlatch, Idaho	Coeur d'Alene, Idaho	1927	1935	Replaced by US-95
US 99E	—	—	Portland, Oregon	Junction City, Oregon	1930	1972	Replaced by US 99 / OR 99E / I-5
US 99E	—	—	Sacramento, California	Red Bluff, California	1928	1968	Replaced by US 99 Alt. / SR 99 / SR 65 / I-80 / I-80 Bus. / SR 36 / SR 20 / SR 70
US 99E	—	—	Manteca, California	Stockton, California	1929	1933	Replaced by US 99 / SR 99
US 99W	—	—	Portland, Oregon	Junction City, Oregon	1930	1972	Replaced by US 99 Alt. / OR 99W
US 99W	—	—	Sacramento, California	Red Bluff, California	1928	1968	Replaced by US 99 / I-5 / SR 113 / I-80 / SR 275
US 99W	—	—	Manteca, California	Stockton, California	1929	1933	Replaced by I-5 / US 50
US 101E	—	—	San Francisco, California	San Jose, California	1929	1935	Replaced by I-80 / I-880 / US 40 / US 50 / US 101 Alt.
US 101E	—	—	La Jolla, California	San Diego, California	1934	1936	Replaced by I-5 / US 101
US 101W	—	—	San Francisco, California	San Jose, California	1929	1935	Replaced by US 101
US 101W	—	—	La Jolla, California	San Diego, California	1934	1936	Replaced by La Jolla Boulevard
US 112S	—	—	Rolling Prairie, Indiana	Union, Michigan	1933	1934	Replaced by SR 2 / SR 19 / M-205
US 191Y	3.5	5.6	Luzena, Arizona	Northwest of Luzena, Arizona	1961	current	Unsigned. ADOT-designated, not officially recognized by AASHTO
US 281S	—	—	Oberon, North Dakota	Lallie, North Dakota	1939	1940	Replaced by 35th Street and 64th Avenue
US 301N	11.2	18.0	Summit Bridge, Delaware	State Road, Delaware	1959	1983	
US 301S	10.69	17.20	Summit Bridge, Delaware	State Road, Delaware	1959	1983	
Former

== See also ==
- List of suffixed Interstate Highways
