= Bridgewater Center =

Bridgewater Center may refer to:

- Bridgewater Center Historic District, a historic district in Connecticut
- Bridgewater Center, Ohio, an unincorporated community
