= Bridgewater station (New York) =

BRIDGEWATER
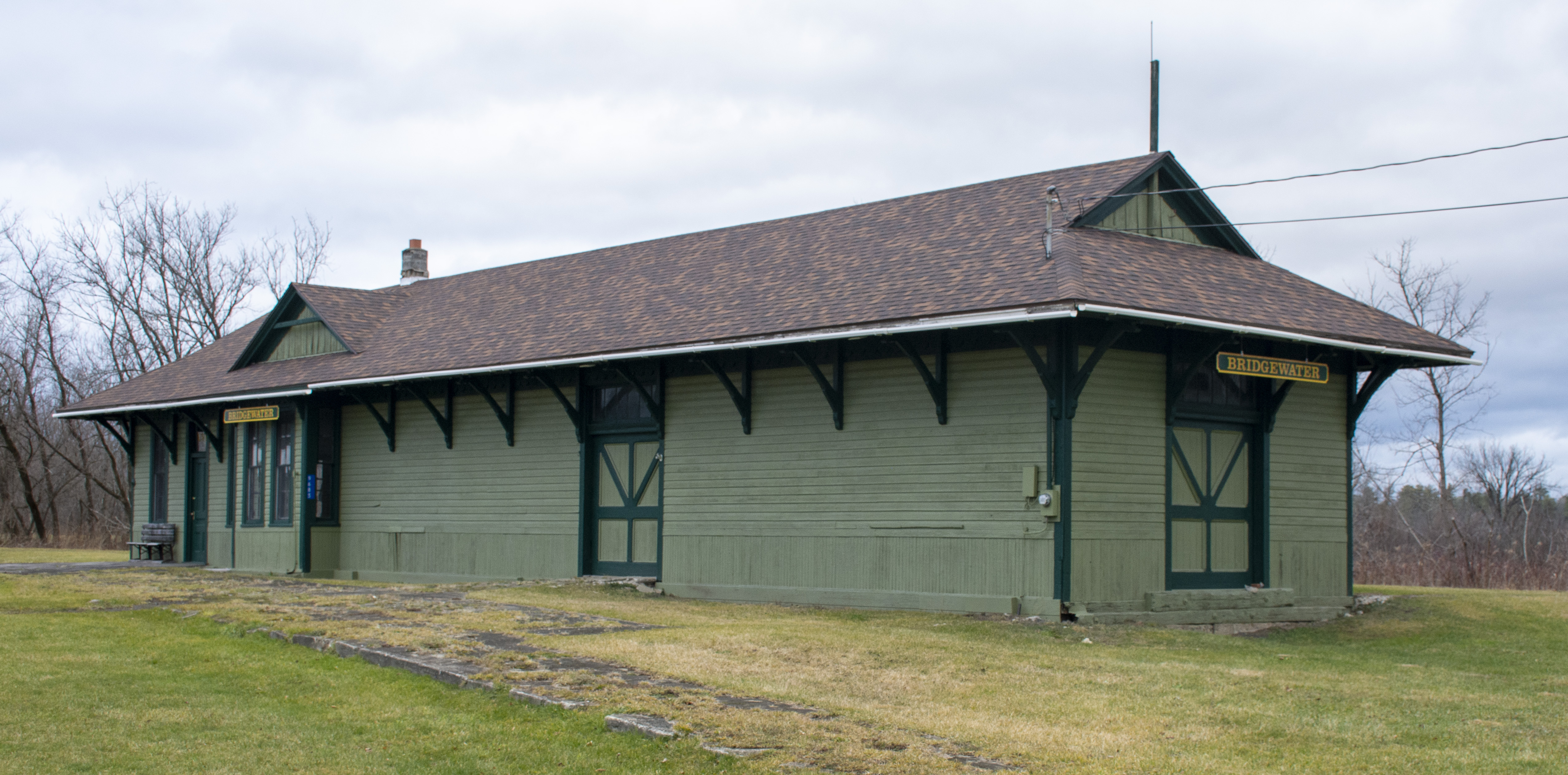

General information
- Location: U.S. Route 20, Bridgewater, Oneida County, New York 13313
- Line: Richfield Springs Branch

Former services
Preceding station	Delaware, Lackawanna and Western Railroad	Following station
Richfield Junction Terminus	Richfield Springs Branch	West Winfield toward Richfield Springs
- Bridgewater Railroad Station
- U.S. National Register of Historic Places
- Location within New York Location within the United States
- Location: US 20, Bridgewater, New York
- Coordinates: 42°52′45″N 75°14′48″W
- Area: less than one acre
- Built: 1901
- NRHP reference No.: 06000264
- Added to NRHP: April 12, 2006
Location

Bridgewater station is a historic train station located at Bridgewater in Oneida County, New York. It was built in 1901 and is a one-story, rectangular, timber-frame building 20 feet by 91 feet. It was built by the short line Unadilla Valley Railway and also served the separate line of the Delaware, Lackawanna and Western Railroad branch to Richfield Springs, New York. It ceased use as a station in 1960 and is now home to the Bridgewater Historical Society.

It was listed on the National Register of Historic Places in 2006 as the Bridgewater Railroad Station.
