= Bridgewater Heights, Minnesota =

Coordinates: 44°25′30″N 93°10′44″W

Bridgewater Heights is a subdivision development in Dundas, in Rice County, Minnesota, United States. It was originally developed by D. R. Horton, though the company has since divested most of the undeveloped land. Named after Bridgewater Township (from which land was annexed for the development), it is set on a bluff, and surrounded by a rural landscape.

The development is in the far northeast corner of Dundas, and somewhat unusually, is not contiguous with the Dundas road network. Its only access is from Rice County Road 1, through Bridgewater Township.

Bridgewater Heights will soon have a park at 1600 Pinnacle Drive, featuring slides, monkeybars, a see-saw, a small climbing wall, and ground activities for disabled children.
