= Jim Gerritsen =

American farmer and activist from Maine

- Born: Maine, U.S.
- Occupations: Farmer; Activist
- Known for: Proponent of Organic Farming, Trade Union Activism
- Spouse: Megan Gerritsen

Jim Gerritsen is an American farmer and activist from Maine. He is mostly known for his involvements in the politics of Organic Farming as the proponent of the same. Gerritsen is President of the Maine-based national trade organization Organic Seed Growers and Trade Association (OSGATA).

In March 2011, Gerritsen and other farmers filed a lawsuit (OSGATA et al v. Monsanto) against Monsanto Corporation to prevent it from suing farmers who have been contaminated by their genetically modified seeds for patent infringement. Gerritsen used to own and operate Wood Prairie Farm in Bridgewater, Maine, where he primarily grew organic Maine Certified seed potatoes and other organic seed since the farm was established in 1976. The farm's ownership and operations have been handed over to Gerritsen's son 2016 onwards

== Activism ==
In January 2014, the Supreme Court of the United States refused to hear OSGATA et al v. Monsanto, effectively ending the case. However, American farmers gained partial protection with the ruling by the Court of Appeals for the Federal Circuit in Washington, D.C. which had issued an estoppel, ordering Monsanto not to sue farmers for patent infringement should they become contaminated by trace amounts of Monsanto's patented seed technology.

Gerritsen co-founded the Slow Food Aroostook and he is also known as the co-founder of the local chapter of the Organic Crop Improvement Association.

In November 2011, the Utne Reader named Gerritsen an "Organic Food Champion" and one of the magazine's "world visionaries" for that year.

Gerritsen has connected the message of Occupy Wall Street to the loss of family farms and spoke at the Occupy Farmers March in New York City in December 2011.

In 2013, he received Jim Cook Award for his contributions to Maine's local food movement.

In January 2014, Gerritsen participated in the first ever Agrarian Elders Conference in Big Sur, CA.

On Mother Earth Day 2014, Gerritsen spoke about the superiority of organic farming systems before the United Nations in New York City as a panel member of the 4th Interactive Dialogue of the General Assembly.

In 2016, Gerritsen along with his wife legally sold their farm Wood Prairie Family Farm to their son. In March 2018, Gerritsen and his wife filed for a 'personal bankruptcy protection'. They listed for $460,000 in debt.
