= Bridgewater Town Hall and Jail =

- U.S. National Register of Historic Places
- Location within Maine Location within the United States
- Location: Rt. 1, Bridgewater, Maine
- Coordinates: 46°14′45″N 67°50′50″W
- Area: less than one acre
- Built: 1894
- Architect: Collins, G.W.
- Architectural style: Italianate
- NRHP reference No.: 89002339
- Added to NRHP: January 26, 1990

The former Bridgewater Town Hall and Jail are a pair of civic buildings on United States Route 1 in the center of Bridgewater, Maine. Built in 1894 and c. 1910 respectively, the buildings are the best-preserved and most architecturally distinguished of the community's surviving early civic structures. The town hall, in addition to its government functions, also hosted fraternal and social organizations, as well as community events. The buildings were listed on the National Register of Historic Places in 1990.

== Description and history ==
The former Bridgewater Town Hall is a two-story wood frame structure, three bays in width, with a hip roof and weatherboard siding. The main (west-facing) facade has a central entrance topped by a relatively large transom window, and framed by pilasters and an entablature with cornice. The entablature and cornice are repeated at smaller scale above the sash windows that fill the remaining bays. The building's corners are decorated with pilasters, and an entablature encircles the building below broad eaves. The building is a well-preserved and little-altered example of late 19th-century civic architecture.

The main entrance leads into a vestibule area, which includes a ticket booth and a storage area. The main hall fills the rest of the first floor, with a stage at the far end. The upper level of the building has a kitchen and dining area, and a second hall which was used by fraternal organizations.

Adjacent to the town hall and on the same property stands the small jail. It is a small rectangular structure with a hip roof, fashioned from ornamental concrete blocks. It is a door at one end and a single window at the other.

Bridgewater was incorporated in 1858. Its first meeting hall was destroyed by fire, prompting construction of this building in 1894. Soon afterward, a chapter of the International Order of Odd Fellows (IOOF) was formed, which acquired ownership interest in the upper floor. It was used by the IOOF and its sister organization, the Rebekahs, and later a local Grange organization, until 1942. The town originally used the ground floor for offices and meetings, but has since moved these functions to other locations. The ground floor is now occupied by local organizations including the historical society.

== See also ==
- National Register of Historic Places listings in Aroostook County, Maine
