= Amber E. Robinson =

American educator, postmaster and poet

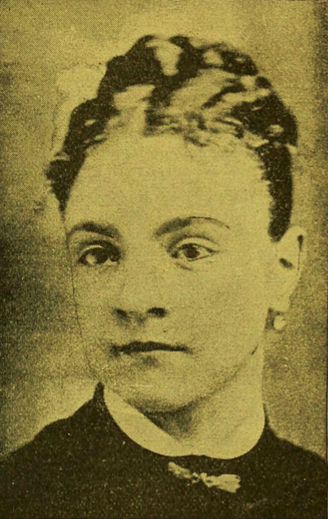
- Portrait photo in Local and national poets of America, 1890
- Born: Amber Elizabeth Ketchum; February 14, 1867; Bridgewater, Maine, U.S.
- Died: February 1961 (aged 93–94); Los Angeles County, California, U.S.
- Occupations: educator; postmaster; poet; reporter; social reformer
- Spouse: William Ellsworth Robinson (m. 1883)
- Children: 2

Amber E. Robinson (née, Ketchum; 1867–1961) was an American educator, postmaster, poet, reporter, and social reformer. She advocated for women's suffrage, was active in the temperance movement, and taught from age 16. Robinson was well-known as a lecturer and writer in the press columns and was influential in the State of Maine.

== Early life and education ==
Amber Elizabeth Ketchum, only daughter of John Franklin and Lenora Parker (Foote) Ketchum, was born in Bridgewater, Maine, on February 14, 1867. Her mother was a near relative of Commodore Foote.

She was a granddaughter of Joseph Ketchum, one of the earliest settlers of Bridgewater, Maine, his son James being the first European child born in the town where Joseph Ketchum settled in this then uninhabited village of Aroostook County, Maine. He cut the first timber on the Presteel, and when he had done a little clearing, he sewed the first wheat ever seen in Bridgewater. He built a public inn at Bridgewater and was its proprietor, the only house of public entertainment between Houlton and Presque Isle, Maine.

The Ketchums came originally from France. Joseph Ketchum (1799-1876) was born in Saint John, New Brunswick, Canada. He married Elizabeth Foye (1804-1864). They were the parents of ten children: Adolphus, Salome, Samuel, Mary, Ann, James, Harriet, John Franklin, Jarvis, and Edward.

John Franklin Ketchum (1836-1915), son of Joseph and Elizabeth (Foye) Ketchum, was born in Bridgewater, Maine. He enlisted in the Union Army from Maine, on December 8, 1864, and served until the Civil War closed, his regiment a part of the army commanded by General Sherman. He was a farmer of Bridgewater and a lifelong Democrat. He married (second) on July 30, 1863, Lenora Parker Foote (b. 1847). Children: Emma Ida (b. 1857), a daughter by his first wife; Amber Elizabeth (married surname, Robinson); Leslie Mount (b. 1875). John and Lenora Ketchum were members of the Baptist church.

Amber attended the public schools of Bridgewater and Blaine, Maine.

== Career ==
Beginning at the age of 16, Robinson taught for 42 years. Her total career spanned 52 years and included providing services as the postmaster of her city.

A forcible writer, Robinson was a reporter for various newspapers in Maine, including the Bangor Daily News and Presque Isle Star Herald. She was the author of a volume of poems. Her poetry also appeared in the Chicago-based Christian Scientist and the periodical press.

She was known to be an engaging, fluent speaker, in demand on public occasions, who spoke on educational and religious subjects.

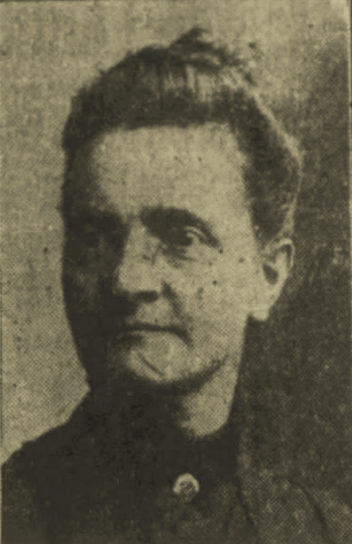
The Lewiston Daily Sun, 1924

Robinson was an advocate of women's suffrage. She was an active Maine State Woman's Christian Temperance Union worker.

== Personal life ==
At Blaine, on September 22, 1883, she married William Ellsworth Robinson (b. 1862). They were the parents of Oscar Burton (b. 1884) and Clinton Burleigh (b. 1866).

In politics, she was a Republican. In religious preferences, she was a Unitarian. She was a member of the O. E. S. Rebekahs.

In later life, she lived with a son in Torrance, California. Amber E. Robinson died in Los Angeles County, California, in February 1961.
