= HMS Bridgewater =

Four ships of the Royal Navy have borne the name HMS Bridgewater, while one ship of the navy of the Commonwealth of England has also carried the name:

- Bridgewater was a 58-gun ship launched in 1654. After the English Restoration in 1660 she was renamed HMS Anne and was blown up in 1673.
- HMS Bridgewater (1698) was a 32-gun fifth rate launched in 1698. She was converted to a fireship in 1727, was rebuilt as a sixth rate in 1729 and was broken up in 1738.
- HMS Bridgewater (1740) was a 20-gun sixth rate launched in 1740 and wrecked in 1743.
- HMS Bridgewater (1744) was a 24-gun sixth rate launched in 1744. She was run ashore and burnt in 1758 to avoid being captured by the French.
- HMS Bridgewater (L01) was a Bridgewater-class sloop launched in 1928 and sold for breaking up in 1947.
