= H.E. Salzberg Company =

Defunct railway scrap dealer and shortline operator

H.E. Salzberg Company was a scrap dealer and operator of a group of shortline railroads and bus lines throughout the eastern United States. Headquartered in New York City, the company was primarily in the business of dismantling abandoned railroads and processing the valuable steel rails for scrap. The company was founded by Harry Salzberg in the 1890s. After his death in 1948, his son Murray M. Salzberg became the head of the company. Aside from operating the scrap company and the shortline railroads, Salzberg was also owner of Queens Transit Corporation and Steinway Transit Corporation in Queens, New York, and was also on the board of the reorganized Central Railroad of New Jersey beginning in 1979.

H. E. Salzberg & Company, Inc., incorporated under the laws of the State of New York in 1918.

Each year, Syracuse University's Whitman School of Management presents the Salzberg Medallion, a prestigious award in the transportation and supply-chain management industry. The award was established in 1949 by Murray Salzberg to honor his father's transportation career.

== Historic List of Salzberg Railroads ==
- Fort Dodge, Des Moines and Southern Railroad (1955–1968)
- Hoosac Tunnel and Wilmington Railroad (1936–1937)
- Southern New Jersey Railroad (1936–1939)
- Louisiana and North West Railroad (1958–1986)
- Southern New York Railway (1939–1971)
- Arkansas Valley Railway (1939–1942)
- Unadilla Valley Railway (1937–1960)
- Arkansas and Ozarks Railway (1949–1960)
- St. Johnsbury and Lamoille County Railroad (1956–1967)
- Jamestown, Westfield and Northwestern Railroad (1943–1950)
- Wellsville, Addison and Galeton Railroad (1956–1979)
