= Brick Store Building =

Historic commercial building in New York, United States

- U.S. National Register of Historic Places
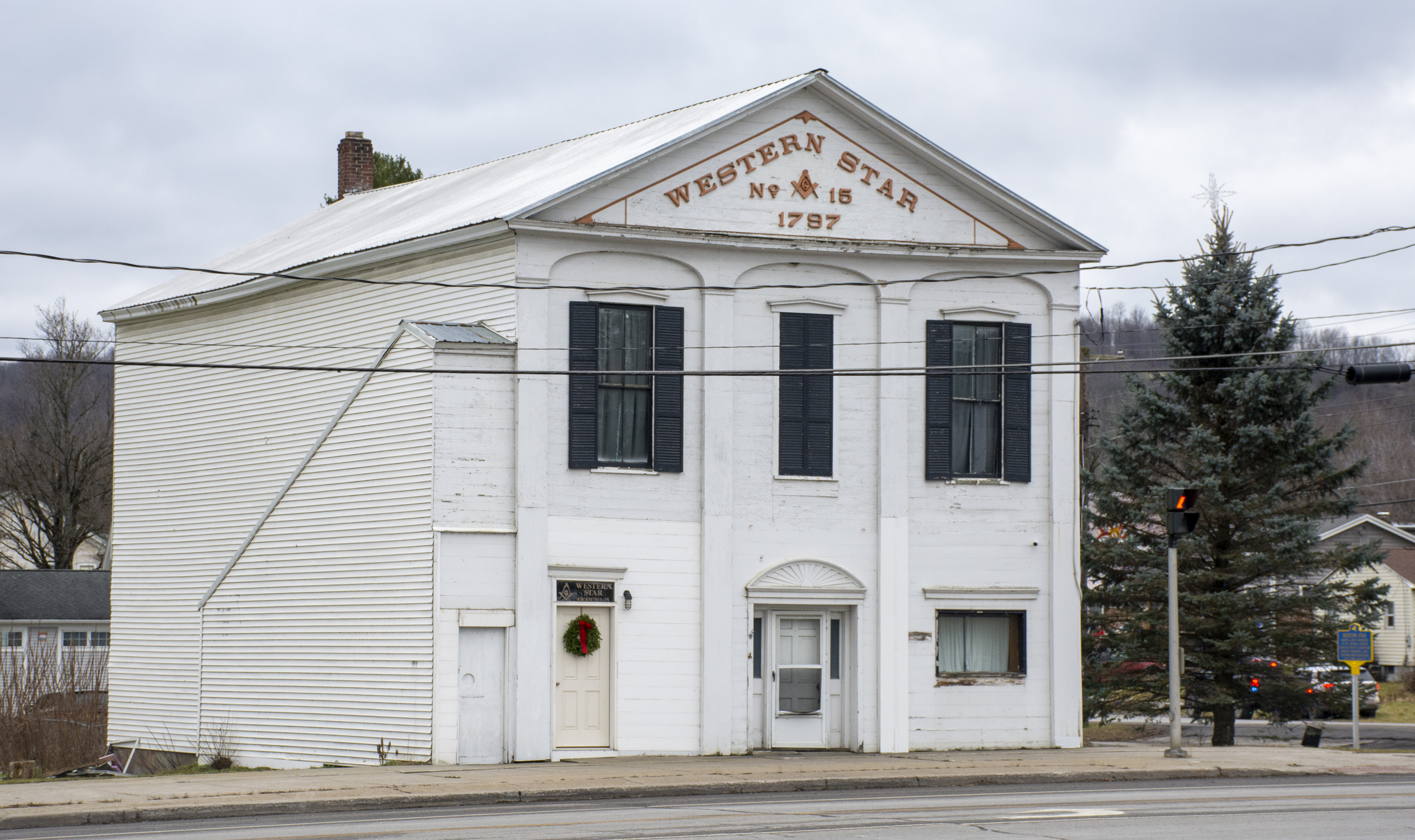

- Location within New York Location within the United States
- Location: Jct. of US 20 and NY 8, Bridgewater, New York
- Coordinates: 42°52′44″N 75°15′7″W
- Area: less than one acre
- Built: 1807
- Architectural style: Federal
- NRHP reference No.: 96000486
- Added to NRHP: April 26, 1996

The Brick Store Building is a historic commercial building located at Bridgewater in Oneida County, New York.

== Description and history ==
It was built in 1807, and consists of a two-story, gable-roofed, rectangular brick main block with a two-story, wood-framed rear wing in a vernacular Federal style. The entire building rests on a limestone foundation.

It was listed on the National Register of Historic Places on April 26, 1996.
