= Frank M. Hume =

Brig. General Frank Merton Hume
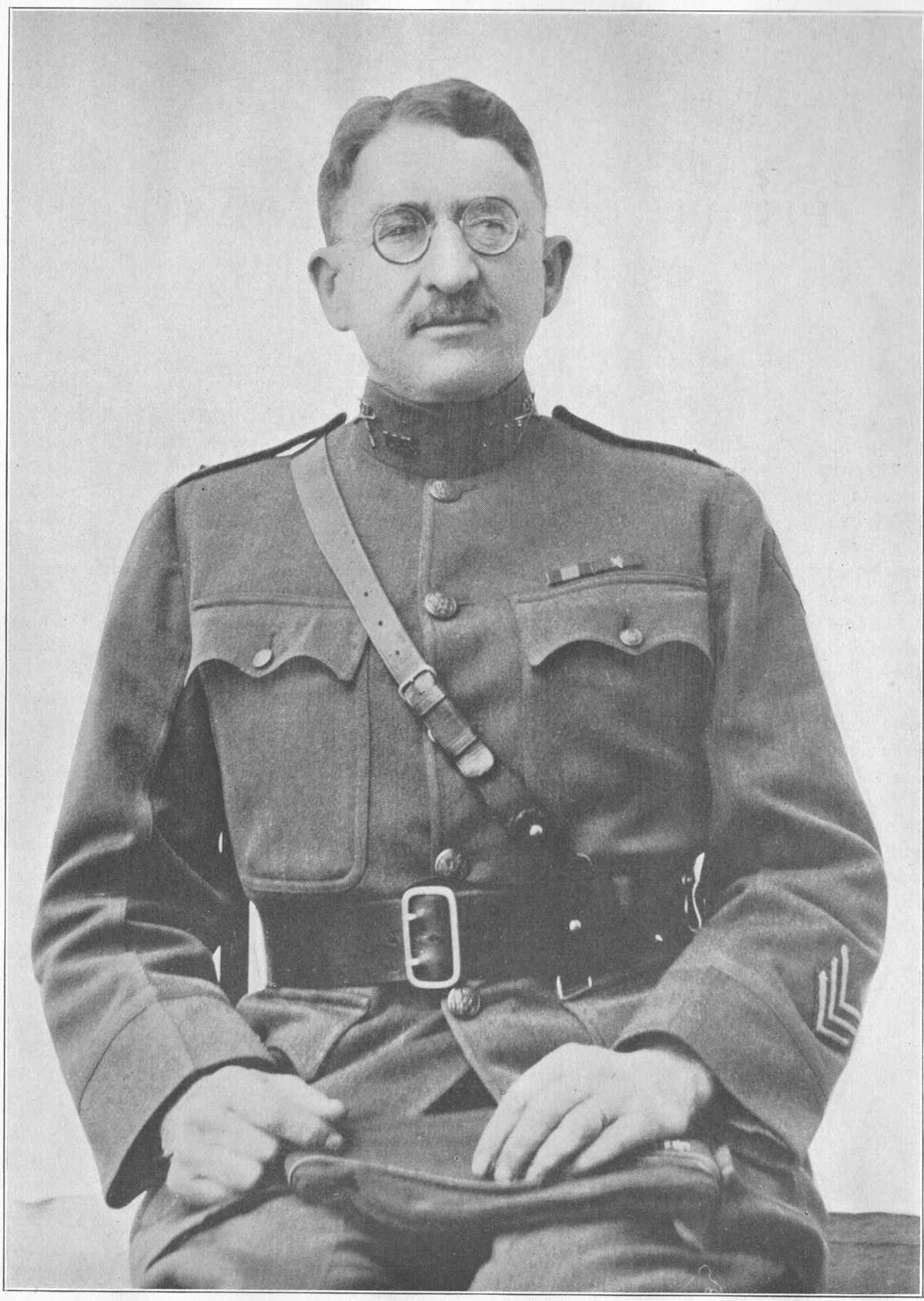
- Born: January 7, 1867; Bridgewater, Maine, US
- Died: August 6, 1939 (aged 72); Houlton, Maine, US
- Burial place: Evergreen Cemetery, Houlton, Maine
- Spouse: Harriette L. Ebbett
- Military career
- Allegiance: United States
- Branch: United States Army; Maine Army National Guard
- Service years: 1894–1918
- Rank: Brigadier General
- Conflicts: Spanish–American War; World War I: Second Battle of the Marne; Meuse-Argonne Offensive
- Awards: Army Distinguished Service Medal; Croix de Guerre

Brigadier General Frank M. Hume (January 7, 1867 – June 6, 1939) was the commanding officer of the 103rd Infantry, 26th Division during World War I. Hume was involved in the Spanish–American War and World War I. He earned the Army Distinguished Service Medal for his service, as well as the Croix de Guerre.

== Early life ==
Frank Merton Hume was born on January 7, 1867, to Bedford and Mary Kidder Hume. He had an older sister, Helen Hester (1864–?), and a younger brother, Charles Guy (1872–?). Although he was born in Bridgewater, Maine, he spent most of his life in Houlton, Maine. From a young age, Hume had the instincts of a soldier, and enjoyed banding his friends together to create their own "army." He spent most of his time studying history and battles.

At some point, Hume contracted scarlet fever. He recovered, but was left with poor eyesight. Because of this, he was unable to gain admission to West Point, to which he applied after the death of his father. This setback did not stop him however. Hume attended Riverview Military Academy in Poughkeepsie, New York, and completed his education at Harvard University.

From November 19, 1897, to June 20, 1914, he worked as a postmaster.

== Military career ==
Hume served in the National Guard, and was commissioned in the 2nd Maine Infantry on April 2, 1894.

After he finished school, Hume returned to Bridgewater and formed his own army. He was able to secure recognition from the state of Maine. The outfit was designated Company L, National Guard of the State of Maine. He continued to gradually earn promotions throughout his service with the Maine militia. He was commissioned major on June 7, 1894. On July 14, 1903, Hume was commissioned lieutenant colonel. Seven years later on July 16, he was commissioned colonel. As colonel, Hume commanded the 2nd Maine Infantry during its service on the Mexican Border from June 19 to October 25, 1916.

Hume enlisted in the 2nd Maine Infantry for the Spanish–American War. During the war, Hume was Captain of Battery B, 1st Battalion, Heavy Artillery Maine Volunteers from June 20 to March 31, 1899.

During World War I, Colonel Hume commanded the 103rd Infantry, which was formed by joining the 2nd Maine Infantry and the old 1st New Hampshire Infantry. He served from September 25, 1917, to April 7, 1919. During the Chemin des Dames engagement, Hume suffered from "shell concussion" and lost hearing in one ear.

Colonel Hume participated in the following engagements:

- Chemin des Dames: February 5 – March 20, 1918
- Toul Sector: April 1 – June 27, 1918
- Second Battle of the Marne: July 4–26, 1918
- St. Mihel Drive: September 12 – October 12, 1918
- Meuse-Argonne Offensive: October 24 – November 6, 1918

On June 16, 1918, he was awarded the Croix de Guerre after the Battle of Seicheprey. He also earned the Distinguished Service Medal for "exceptionally meritorious and distinguished services while in command of the 103rd Infantry, during the St. Mihiel and Meuse-Argonne operations."

Three days before the armistice, Colonel Hume and Colonel Edward L. Logan were removed from their positions. They were charged with fraternizing with the Germans, but these charges were proved to be "groundless." In actuality, it was their men who were accused, but as commanding officers, they were held responsible. He was later reinstated on February 4, 1919. It was speculated that the Regular Army officers were trying to get rid of any National Guard officers so that the "regulars may get the glory and lead the boys back home".

Hume was known for his thoughtful and considerate nature as a leader. In his biography, "The Old Man" of the 103rd, a soldier who served with him emphasized that Colonel Hume always checked on the boys to ensure they were healthy and comfortable. In one instance, while stationed in Cuba, Hume gave a speech to his troops and warned them to steer away from "whiskey and women".

== Post-war ==
In November 1920, Hume was appointed treasurer of Aroostook county. He remained in this position till January 1927. On March 1, 1927, he was sworn in as the new collector of customs. On February 5, 1931, Hume was reappointed to the office of Collector of Customs and remained in the position till June 1933.

In 1923, Hume became a candidate for the Republican nomination for United States Senator, but later withdrew from the race.

In August 1937, Hume was placed on the retired list of the Maine National Guard with the rank of brigadier general.

== Personal life ==
Hume married Harriette L. Ebbett on November 15, 1893. They had one child.

Frank M. Hume died on June 6, 1939. He was buried on June 8, 1939, in Evergreen Cemetery located in Houlton, Maine.
