= Bridgewater Township =

Bridgewater Township may refer to:

- Bridgewater Township, Michigan
- Bridgewater Township, Rice County, Minnesota
- Bridgewater Township, New Jersey
- Bridgewater Township, Williams County, Ohio
- Bridgewater Township, Susquehanna County, Pennsylvania
