= Bridgewater (CDP), Connecticut =

Census-designated place in Connecticut, United States

Bridgewater, Connecticut
- Census-designated place
- Location within the Western Connecticut Planning Region and the state of Connecticut

- Location within Connecticut Location within the United States
- Coordinates: 41°32′6″N 73°21′59″W
- Country: United States
- State: Connecticut
- County: Litchfield
- Town: Bridgewater

Area
  - Total: 0.27 sq mi (0.70 km^{2})
  - Land: 0.27 sq mi (0.70 km^{2})
  - Water: 0 sq mi (0.0 km^{2})
- Elevation: 655 ft (200 m)
- Time zone: UTC-5 (Eastern (EST))
  - Summer (DST): UTC-4 (EDT)
- ZIP Code: 06752
- Area codes: 860/959
- FIPS code: 09-08140
- GNIS feature ID: 2805976

Bridgewater is a census-designated place (CDP) comprising the populated center of the town of Bridgewater, Litchfield County, Connecticut, United States. It is in the north-central part of the town, around the intersection of Connecticut Routes 133 (Main Street) and 867 (Clapboard Road). It includes the Bridgewater Center Historic District.

Bridgewater was first listed as a CDP prior to the 2020 census.
