= Gerald Evan Williams =

United States Air Force officer (1907–1949)

Colonel Gerald Evan Williams
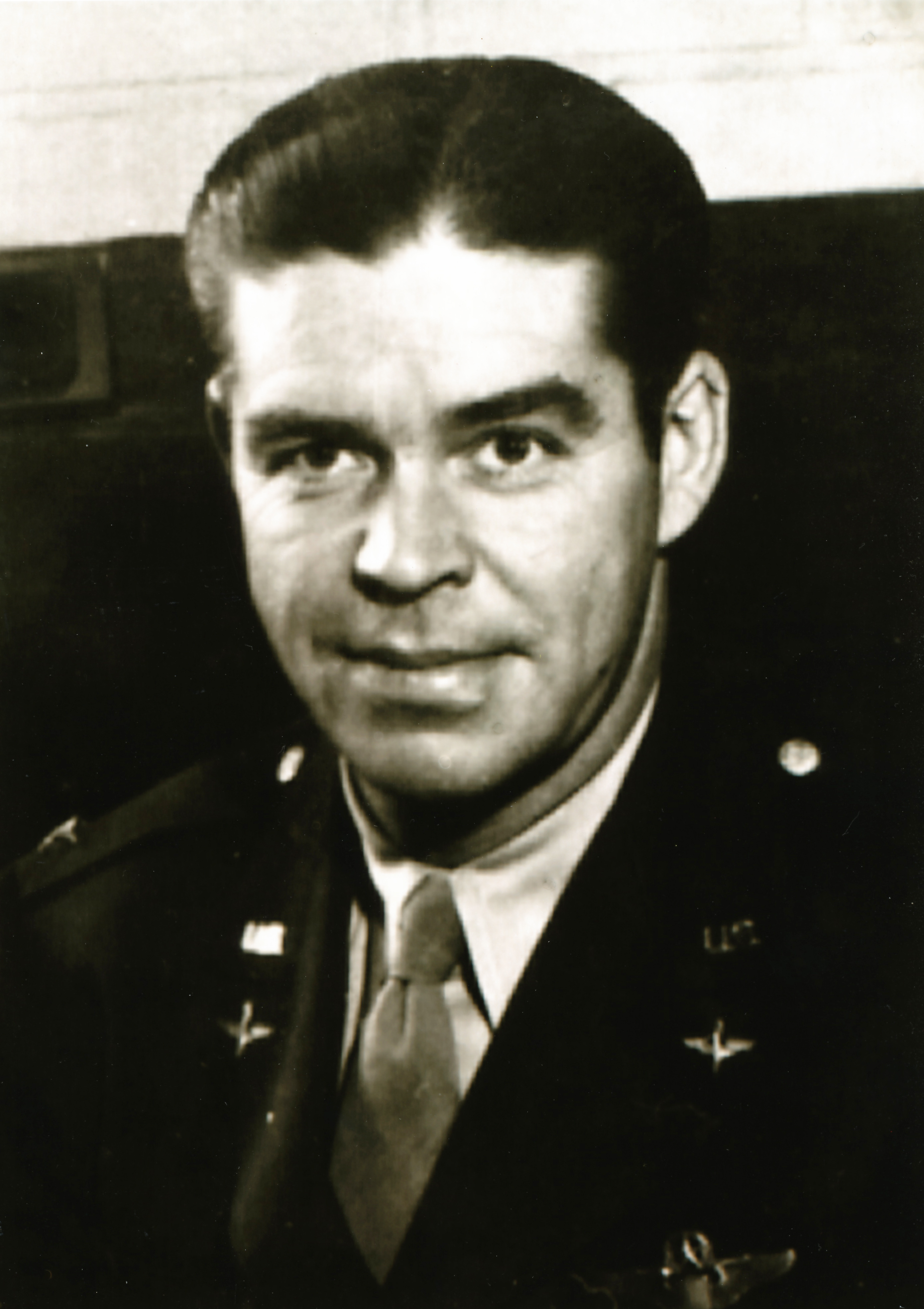
- Col. Gerald E. Williams circa 1943
- Born: December 17, 1907; Bridgewater, Maine, U.S.
- Died: February 17, 1949 (aged 41); Argentina
- Burial place: Fort Sam Houston National Cemetery
- Spouse: Marjorie Parker Williams
- Military career
- Allegiance: United States
- Branch: Air Force
- Service years: 1931–1949
- Rank: Colonel
- Service number: 018604
- Commands: 99 Reconnaissance Squadron 9 Operations Group; 391st Bombardment Group (M) 47 Operations Group
- Awards: Silver Star, Distinguished Flying Cross from the USAAF, Distinguished Flying Cross from Royal Air Force, Croix de Guerre with palm (France), Bronze Star Medal, Air Medal with 12 oak leaf clusters
- Other work: Assistant Air Attaché to American Embassy in Buenos Aires

Gerald Evan Williams (December 17, 1907 – February 17, 1949) was an American officer in the Ninth Air Force during World War II.

== Background and family ==
Gerald Evan Williams was born in Bridgewater, Maine to Myron Luther Williams and Lottie Belle "Belle" (Barrett) Williams. His father's family had lived in Bradford, Maine since before the Civil War, but in his teens Myron moved to the rural potato-growing area of Bridgewater, where he lived with his sister's family, before his marriage. Belle Williams was born in Bridgewater, the daughter of a Canadian-born farmer. Myron Williams worked as a potato buyer. Myron and Belle moved their young family to Presque Isle in 1917, establishing a laundry business in an older section of town. Gerald Williams graduated from Presque Isle High School in 1925 and then studied for a year at Hebron Academy, where he helped the academy win the state championship in football. Congressman Ira G. Hersey of Houlton nominated Williams for appointment to the United States Military Academy.

== West Point and Army Air Corps ==
Gerald Evan Williams entered U.S. Military Academy at West Point in 1926 and graduated with a B.S. degree with the class of 1931. He completed the academic work, while playing football four years, lacrosse two years, and wrestling two years. Shortly before graduation, he was described in the USMA Annual as "[a] cynic, [and] bon vivant, who would rather be wrong than gregarious, rather be right than acquiescent."

== Military career ==
Following his graduation from West Point, Williams enlisted as a 2nd Lt., in the U.S. Army Air Corps. He was assigned to the Flying Service at Randolph, San Antonio, Texas on September 11, 1931 and trained in attack, bombardment, and pursuit groups. He completed Air Corps Primary Flying School, Air Corps Advanced Flying School, and Bombardment Course in 1932, with his advanced flight trainings undertaken at Kelly Field. He would soon demonstrate his skill with multi-engined aircraft (i.e., medium and heavy bombers).

=== Service record ===
Service Group	Location(s)	Date
	Luke Field, Kaalawai, Hawaii,	bef. 1933
20th Bombardment Squadron.	Langley Field, VA	bef. 1937
99 Reconnaissance Squadron (ACC)	Piarco Field, Trinidad	Oct 1941
9 Operations Group	Waller Field, Trinidad; Orlando AB, FL	1942
391st Bombardment Group	Matching, Essex England	26 Jan 1944 – 1 Oct 1944
391st Bombardment Group	Royal Army Airfield, France	19 Sep 1944 – 22 Apr 1945
47 Operations Group	Biggs Field, TX	Aug 1946

Williams was stationed at Luke Field, Kaalawai, Hawaii, where he married Marjorie Parker in April 1933. Williams was rated command pilot, combat observer, navigator (celestial and dead reckoning), bombardier and unlimited pilot.

Williams was next assigned to Langley Field, VA with the 20th Bombardment Squadron. In February 1937 he served as navigator for a flight from Langley Field to Panama, participating in the then-longest non-stop army flight. He experimented and he learned. On a flight in the North American BT-9B from Virginia to San Antonio, Texas, it was reported in the Air Corps News Letter,

"On two legs of the flight he encountered icing conditions, and while the plane picked up considerable ice the flying characteristics did not appear to be affected. The carburetor heat control, however, was entirely inadequate, and time and again with the carburetor heat full on, the carburetor iced up sufficiently to lose flying power. The opening of the mixture control, however, caused the engine to backfire, clearing the ice out of the carburetor."

=== Military ranks and dates ===
Rank	Unit	Date
Col.	Army	Aug. 1944
Lieut. Col.	Army	1 May 1944
Major	Army	18 Mar. 1943
Col.	Army	4 Jan. 1943
Lieut. Col.	Army	23 Jan. 1942
Major (temp.)	Army	15 Jul. 1941
Capt.	Army.	11 Jun. 1941
Capt.	Army	9 Sept. 1940
1 Lieut.	Army	1 Aug. 1935
1 Lieut.(temp)	Army	18 May 1935 – 31 Jul 1935
2 Lieut.	Air Corps	25 Jan. 1933
2 Lieut.	Infantry	11 Jun 1931

=== 1938 Goodwill flight to Argentina ===
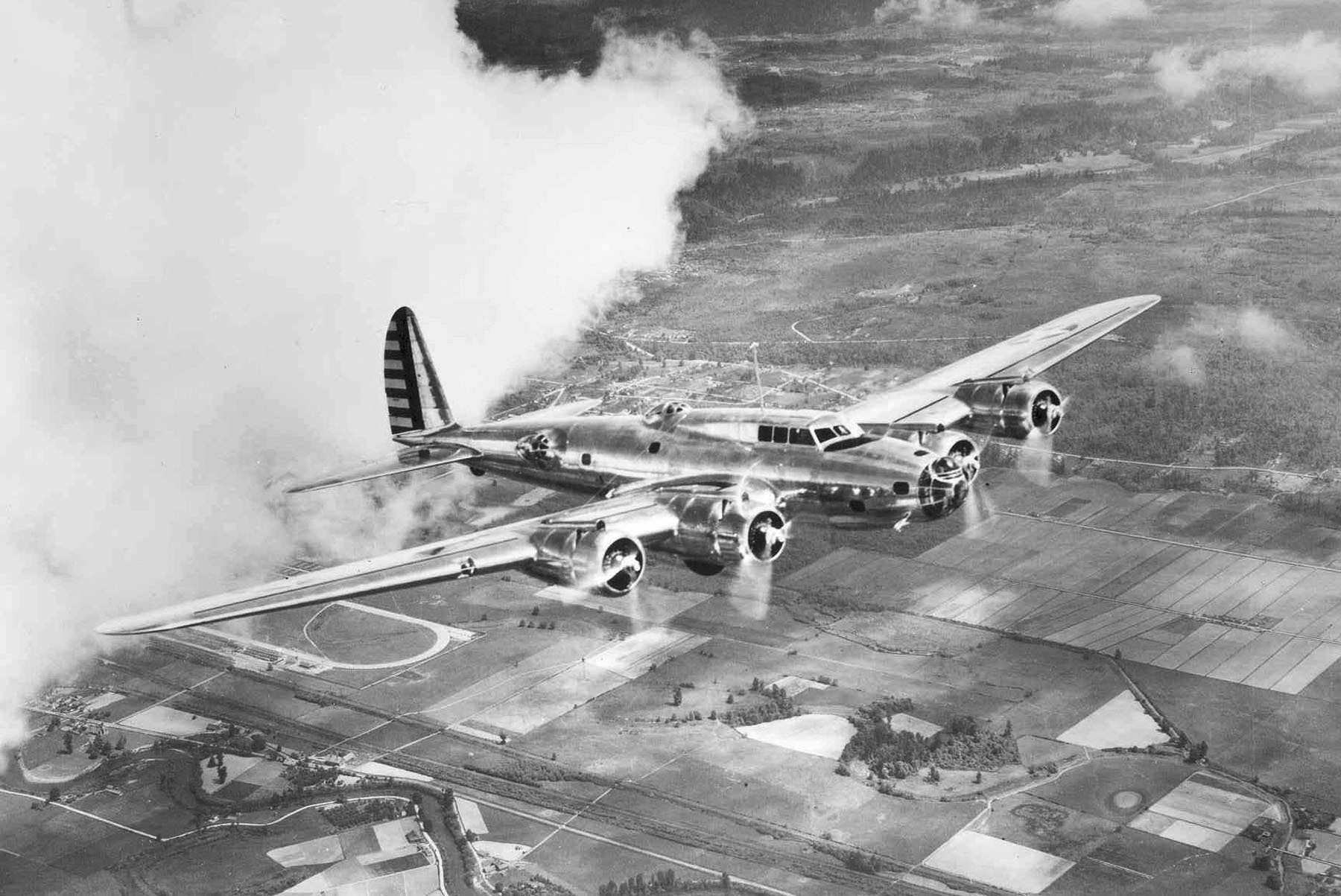
Boeing YB-17 of 2nd BG, 1937

In 1938 Williams was honored as a 1st Lieutenant, to be chosen one of the pilots of a pioneering flight of six early YB-17A "Flying Fortress" four-engined heavy bombers. Part of President Franklin D. Roosevelt's prescient Hemispheric Defense Initiative, the history-making flight commanded by Col. Robert Olds traveled 6,000 miles from Langley Field, Virginia, to Lima, Peru and Buenos Aires, Argentina, where Roberto M. Ortiz was being inaugurated as president. The feat was widely publicized, and an Air Corps newsletter provided lengthy descriptions.

"On a bitingly cold Tuesday morning, at 9 o'clock, February 15, to be exact, the last of the six Boeings lifted gracefully into the air headed south for Miami. This departure was an example of all of the other take-offs of the flight. They were two minutes apart, the flight commander being the first to push the nose of his flying fortress into the cold ozone. With him he carried the greetings of Pres. Franklin D. Roosevelt to the President-elect of the Argentine, Roberto Ortiz."
"As the planes flew toward the appointed rendezvous at Point Salinas, just north of Lima, thousands of Peruvian officials and aviation fans at the Loma Tambo airport were eagerly awaiting the visitors from the Big neighbor of the North. Where frightened civilians in other countries during the past quarter century scanned the skies with dread, these friendly people were eagerly awaiting these Ambassadors of Good Will, who were bringing not bombs but messages of Friendship. Landing at 4:25 PM, the six planes made the record non-stop flight of 2695 miles in 15 hours and 32 minutes."

Williams' accomplishments and skill were becoming legendary. Two years later in a landing at Presque Isle, Maine by Lieut. Williams and Capt. Neil B. Harding, a newspaper article proclaimed, "Famed Aviator Visits His Home Town."

"The purpose of the extended navigation trip is to determine the suitability of the new type drift meter and periodic compass. the trip up was by day to try it out for daytime use."

=== Ninth Bomb Group ===
By 1940, Williams was a captain and served with the Ninth Bomb Group in 1940–1941 in Panama and the Caribbean. In 1941, the United States Army Signal Corps released a photograph of Army planes arriving at Paramaribo, Dutch Guiana. Williams, by then a major, was shown on guard duty with the plane.

== World War II ==
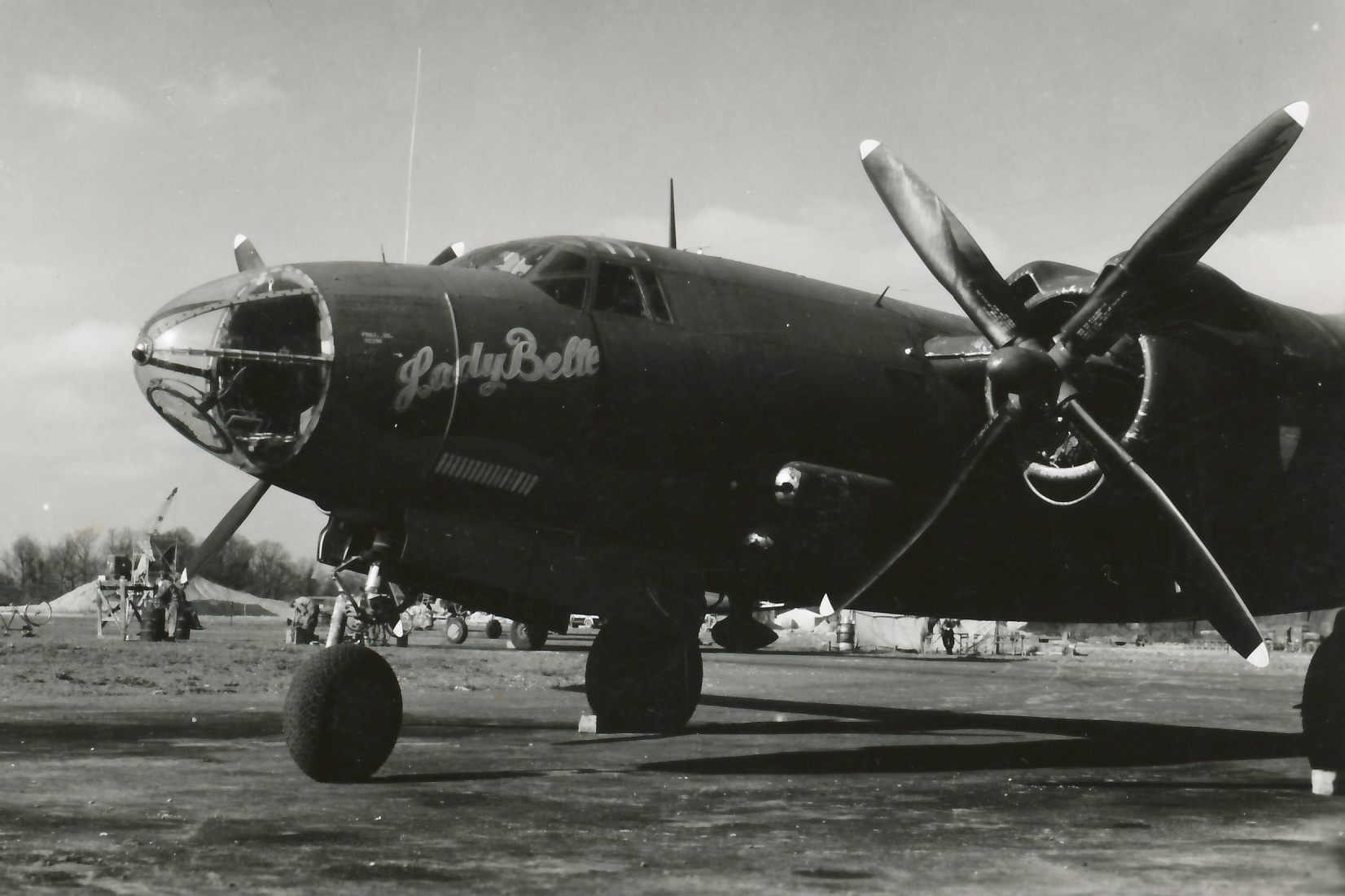
The Lady Belle, B-26 flown by Col. Williams

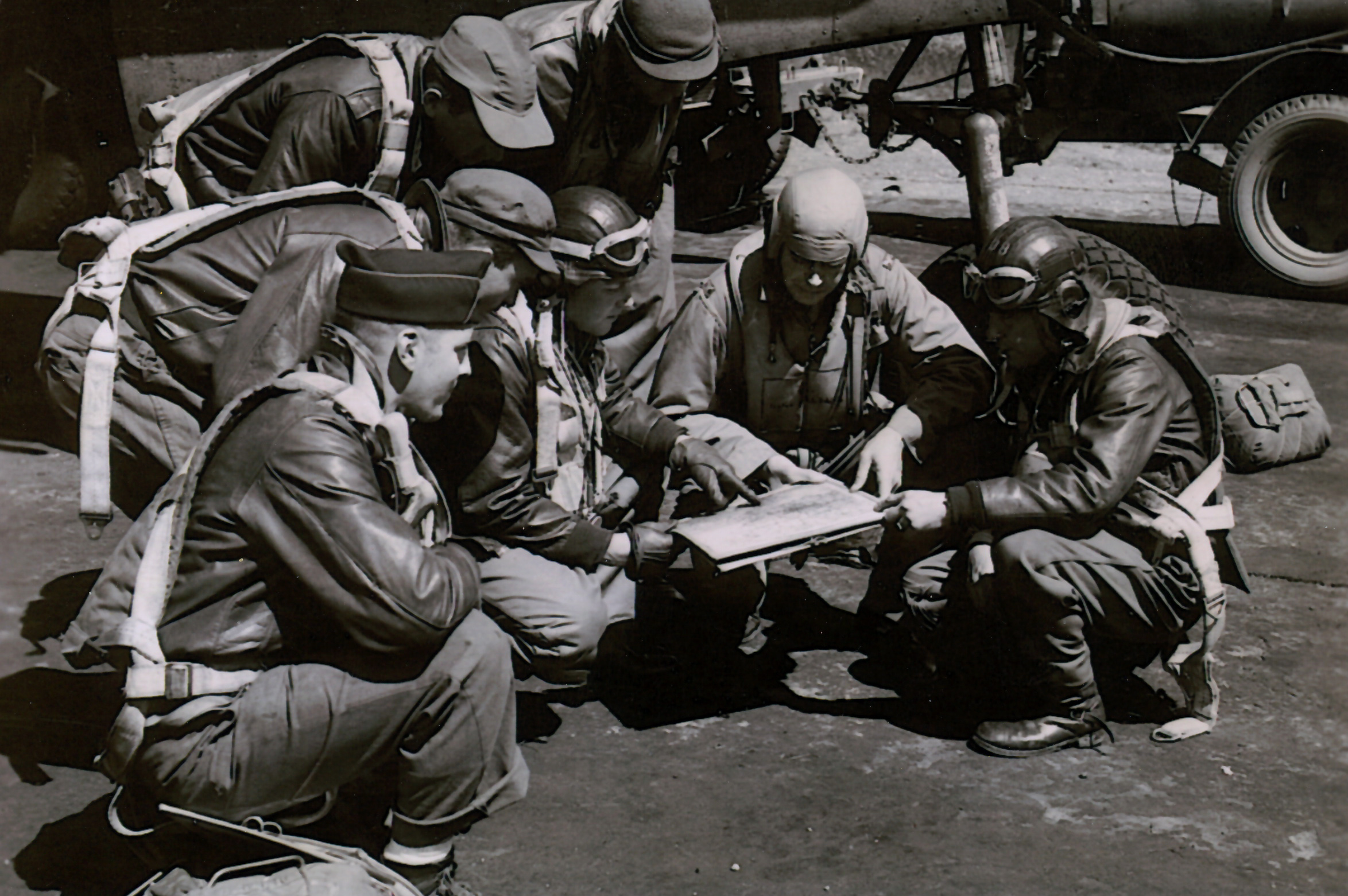
Col. Gerald E. Williams with members of crew, 391st B-26 Marauder group, France, 1944.

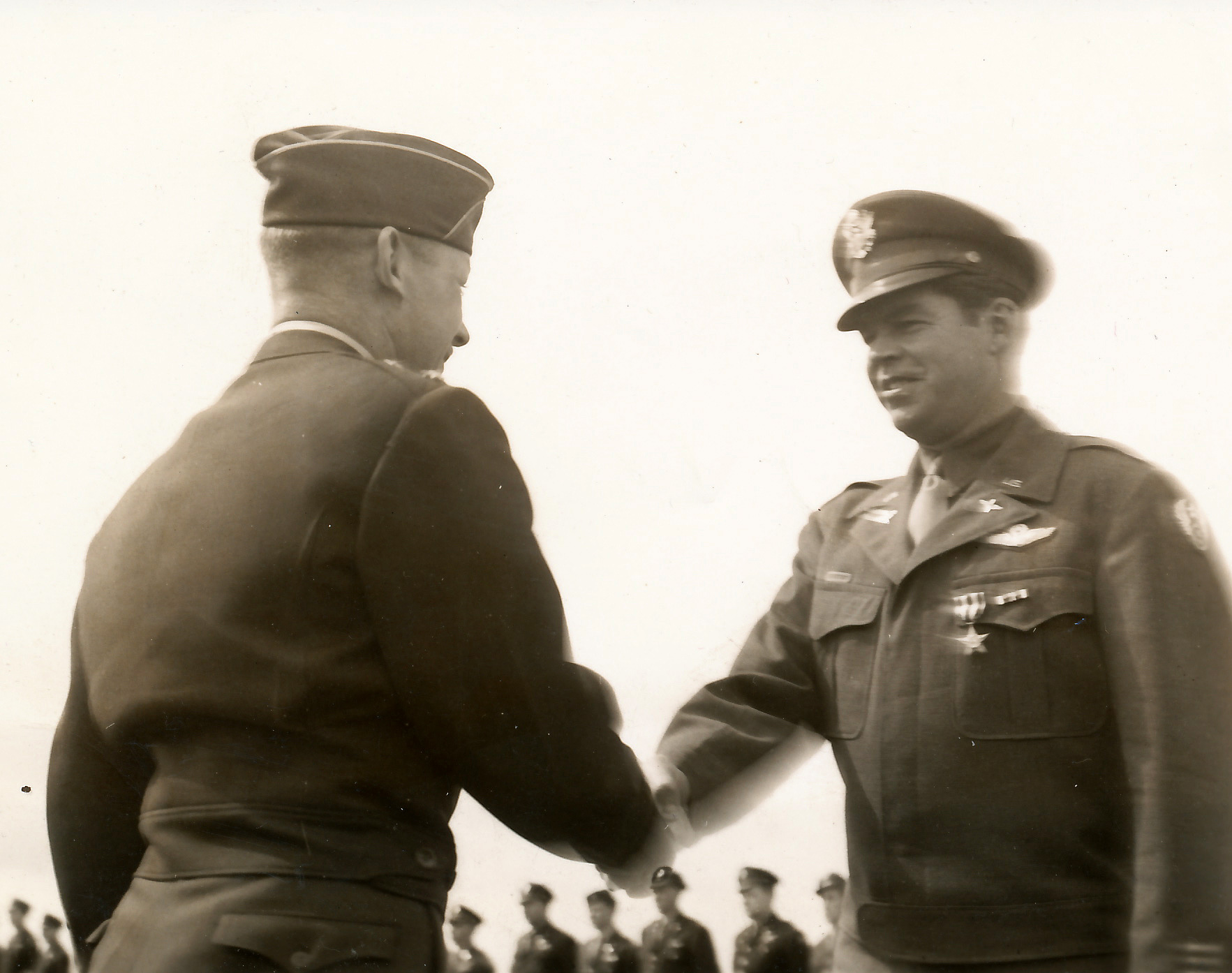
Col. Gerald E. Williams, awarded Silver Star medal and second Oak Leaf Cluster to his Distinguished Flying Cross. France, May 1945.

During the Second World War, Williams became a renowned officer in the U.S. Army Air Forces' Ninth Air Force as commander of the B-26 'Marauder' twin engined medium bombers of the 391st Bombardment Group of the Ninth Bomb Group. from 1943 to 1945. He personally led more than 75 missions, often placing himself as lead pilot in his B-26 Lady Belle on low-level bombing runs against heavily defended Axis targets in Occupied France. The Lady Belle, was named after his mother, Belle Williams.

Williams' Marauders were known as the "Black Death" group. As a California newspaper reported, "In less than eight months of operation the Black Death's Marauders carried destruction to 167 German targets." Williams was awarded a Bronze Star medal "for meritorious achievement in direct support of combat operations against the enemy from December 23 to December 26, 1944." Citing over 200 missions by Williams' B-26 Marauder group, the late December attack at Ahrweiler, Germany was notable.

"The viaduct was wiped out, but the Marauders were jumped by 50 to 100 Luftwaffe fighters in the 'Black Death' group for the bitterest battle of its combat history. Their guns accounted for at least 11 German fighters and four probables. The group, however suffered its heaviest losses since being in operation. Under Col. Williams 'superior leadership and his superb power of organization' the group went back the same day to Germany for a second mission to successfully blast a heavily defended town. Then for three succeeding days Williams' Marauders dealt four smashing blows at German targets without losses."

Williams won Distinguished Flying Crosses from both the USAAF (with two Oak Leaf Clusters), as well as from the Royal Air Force, and the Croix de Guerre from liberated France. Thus three nations paid tribute to his valor and leadership.

Col. Williams has received the Distinguished Flying Cross for a mission May 9, when, according to the citation, he 'led a group against heavily defended enemy installations in occupied France. During the attack his aircraft was severely damaged by flak, his navigator wounded. Disregarding his own personal safety, determined only to lead his group successfully against the enemy target, he continued the bomb run and found the target with devastating effect.'"

The raid on the bridge at Nantes, France, on July 31, 1944 resulted in the second Bronze Oak Leaf Cluster added to his Distinguished Flying Cross. Williams believed that the success of the attack would be jeopardized if he relinquished his lead position. He thus "retained control of his battered bomber and led his formation over the bridge, blasting it out of the water."

In 1945 Gerald E. Williams was awarded a Silver Star Citation for conspicuous gallantry in action, while serving with the Ninth Air Force.

"The inexorable determination, outstanding skill and unhesitating courage of the officers and men of the group in so brilliantly carrying the attack to the enemy is in keeping with the highest traditions of the Army Air Forces."

The citation continued:

"[A]lthough his formation was subjected to intense anti-aircraft fire, Colonel Williams gallantly led his formation to attack the assigned target with superior bombing results. The bombs were released on three road intersections and twenty-seven large buildings were left blazing after the devastating attack. Colonel Williams' fortitude and extreme determination in the face of overwhelming odds contributed materially to the success of joint air-ground operations in the Ardennes Salient and his courageous leadership and coolness under fire reflect high credit upon himself and the Army Air Forces."

== After the war ==
In 1945 Williams was appointed commander of the Rapid City Army Air Base. On August 30, 1946 he became commander of the 47th Light Bombardment Group, composed of the 84th, 85th, and 86th Bomb Squadrons.

== Buenos Aires ==
On April 21, 1948 Williams was appointed Assistant Air Attaché to the American Embassy in Buenos Aires. He worked under Brigadier General B. H. Hovey, the U.S. air attaché. On February 17, 1949, Williams, his wife and six other Air Force officers and enlisted men, were killed when the Air Force C-47 transport piloted by Williams crashed on an Andean mountain in northwestern Argentina, on a flight from Panama en route to Buenos Aires. Williams and his wife were buried at the Fort Sam Houston National Cemetery in San Antonio, Texas. The Congregational Church in Presque Isle, Maine held a memorial service at 11:00 on a Wednesday morning—the very same time as the funeral services in San Antonio.
