= Bridgewater Historic District =

Bridgewater Historic District may refer to the following historic districts in the United States (by state):

- Bridgewater Center Historic District, Bridgewater, Connecticut, listed on the NRHP in Connecticut
- East Bridgewater Common Historic District, East Bridgewater, Massachusetts, listed on the NRHP in Massachusetts
- Bridgewater Historic District (Bridgewater, Pennsylvania), listed on the NRHP in Pennsylvania
- Bridgewater Historic District (Bridgewater, Virginia), listed on the NRHP in Rockingham County, Virginia
