= HMS Bridgewater (1740) =

Frigate of the Royal Navy

History

Great Britain
- Name: HMS Bridgewater
- Ordered: 10 June 1740
- Builder: John Pearson, King's Lynn
- Laid down: 22 January 1740
- Launched: 11 December 1740
- Completed: 5 April 1741
- Commissioned: July 1740
- Fate: Wrecked in St. Mary's Bay, Newfoundland, 18 September 1743

General characteristics
- Tons burthen: 436 35/94 (bm)
- Length: 106 ft 3 in (32.39 m) (gundeck); 87 ft 6 in (26.67 m) (keel)
- Beam: 30 ft 7.5 in (9.335 m)
- Depth of hold: 9 ft 5 in (2.87 m)
- Sail plan: Full-rigged ship
- Complement: 140
- Armament: 20 guns comprising; Gun deck: 20 × 9-pounder cannon

HMS Bridgewater was a sixth-rate 20-gun ship of the Royal Navy, built in 1740 and wrecked in 1743.

She was commissioned in August 1740 under Captain Robert Pett for service in the North Sea and English Channel. In December 1741 Bridgewater was assigned to coastal duties off Newfoundland under Captain Frederick Rogers.

On Christmas Day 1742 she engaged and captured an 18-gun privateer, Santa Rita, off the Scilly Isles. A month later she received her third captain, William Fielding, and returned to her Newfoundland patrol.

Bridgewater was wrecked in St Mary's Bay, Newfoundland on 18 September 1743.
