= Bridgewater Bridge (disambiguation) =

Bridgewater Bridge may refer to:

in Australia

- Bridgewater Bridge, Tasmania, Australia

in the United States

- Bridgewater Corners Bridge, Bridgewater, Vermont, listed on the NRHP in Vermont
- Bridgewater Bridge (Bridgewater, Pennsylvania), a contributing element in Bridgewater Historic District (Bridgewater, Pennsylvania)
