= Bridgewater (surname) =

Bridgewater is a surname. Notable people with the surname include:

- Ann Bridgewater (Chinese: 柏安妮), Hong Kong Actress having British, Chinese and Malaysian ancestry
- Brad Bridgewater (born 1973), American swimmer
- Carl Bridgewater (1965–1978), murdered newspaper boy
- Cecil Bridgewater (born 1942), American jazz trumpeter and composer
- Dee Dee Bridgewater (born 1950), American jazz singer
- John Bridgewater (c.1532–c.1596), English clerical historian
- Teddy Bridgewater (born 1992), American football player
