= Bridgewater Township, Rice County, Minnesota =

Bridgewater Township, Minnesota
- Township
- Location within the state of Minnesota Bridgewater Township, Minnesota (the United States)
- Coordinates: 44°25′N 93°13′W
- Country: United States
- State: Minnesota
- County: Rice
- Established: 1853

Area
  - Total: 36.4 sq mi (94.2 km^{2})
  - Land: 36.3 sq mi (93.9 km^{2})
  - Water: 0.12 sq mi (0.3 km^{2})
- Elevation: 974 ft (297 m)

Population (2000)
  - Total: 1,898
  - Density: 52/sq mi (20.2/km^{2})
- Time zone: UTC-6 (Central (CST))
  - Summer (DST): UTC-5 (CDT)
- Postal codes: 55057, 55019, 55021
- Area code: 507
- FIPS code: 27-07714
- GNIS feature ID: 0663665
- Website: http://bridgewatertwp.org

Bridgewater Township is a township in Rice County, Minnesota, United States. The population was 1,898 at the 2000 census. An elementary school in Northfield and a housing development in Dundas -- Bridgewater Heights—are named after the township. Both were built on land annexed from Bridgewater Township.

== History ==
The first settlement at Bridgewater Township was made in 1853.

== Geography ==
According to the United States Census Bureau, the township has a total area of 36.4 square miles (94 km^{2}), of which 36.3 square miles (94 km^{2}) is land and 0.1 square miles (0.26 km^{2}) (0.30%) is water.

== Demographics ==
As of the census of 2000, there were 1,898 people, 629 households, and 544 families residing in the township. The population density was 52.3 inhabitants per square mile (20.2/km^{2}). There were 643 housing units at an average density of 17.7 per square mile (6.8/km^{2}). The racial makeup of the township was 97.95% White, 0.05% African American, 0.21% Native American, 0.84% Asian, 0.26% from other races, and 0.68% from two or more races. Hispanic or Latino of any race were 1.69% of the population.

There were 629 households, out of which 44.8% had children under the age of 18 living with them, 81.2% were married couples living together, 3.5% had a female householder with no husband present, and 13.5% were non-families. 10.7% of all households were made up of individuals, and 3.7% had someone living alone who was 65 years of age or older. The average household size was 3.00 and the average family size was 3.22.

In the township the population was spread out, with 30.6% under the age of 18, 6.0% from 18 to 24, 26.7% from 25 to 44, 28.9% from 45 to 64, and 7.9% who were 65 years of age or older. The median age was 40 years. For every 100 females, there were 105.9 males. For every 100 females age 18 and over, there were 104.0 males.

The median income for a household in the township was $68,819, and the median income for a family was $72,422. Males had a median income of $47,121 versus $31,597 for females. The per capita income for the township was $28,695. About 1.4% of families and 2.9% of the population were below the poverty line, including 3.5% of those under age 18 and 4.6% of those age 65 or over.
