= Unadilla Valley Railway =

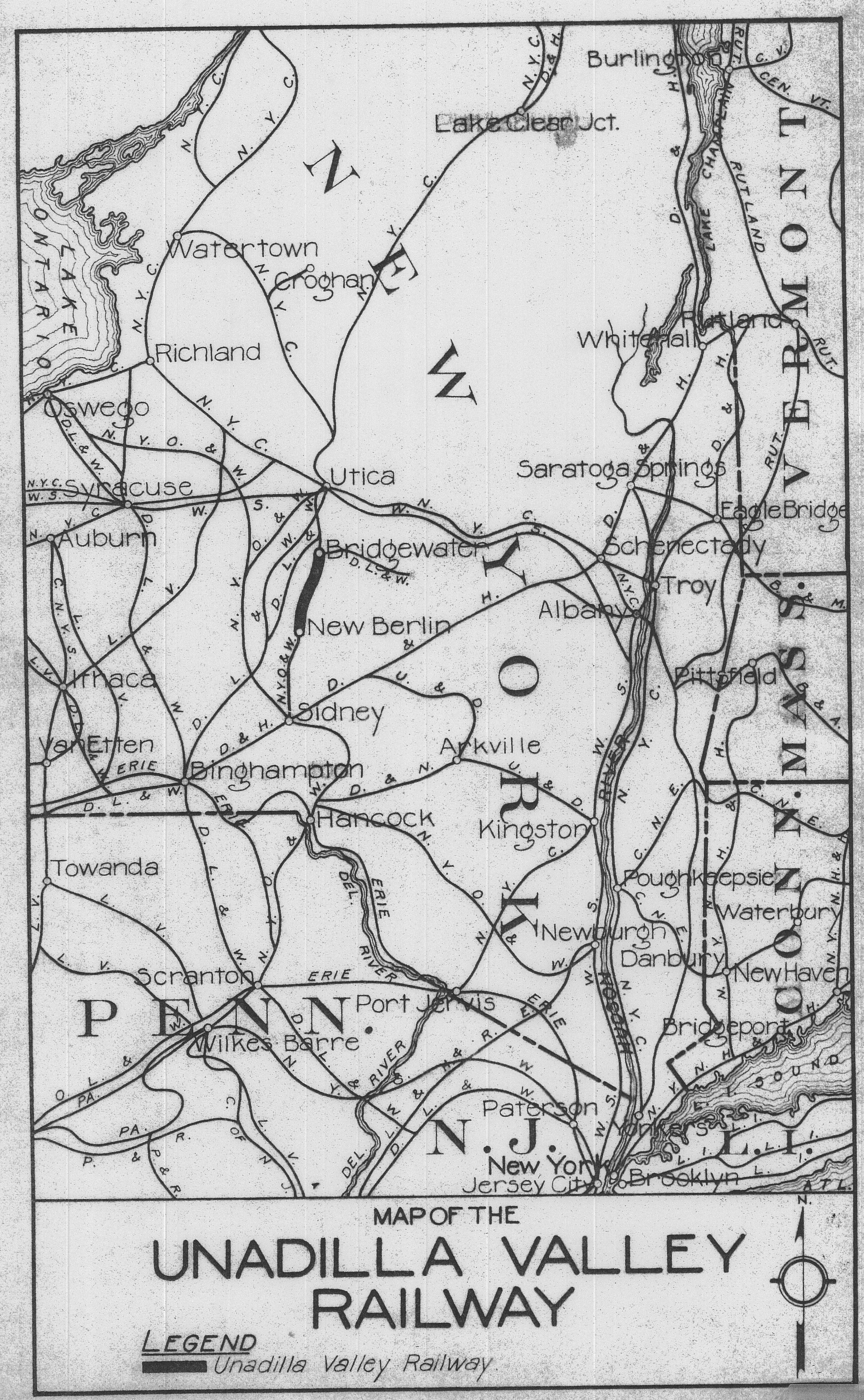
~1917 map of the railroad

The Unadilla Valley Railway was a shortline railroad company that operated in the Unadilla Valley of upstate New York from its opening in 1895 to its abandonment in 1960. From 1937 onwards, it was owned by the H.E. Salzberg Company.

Originally only running for 19 miles between New Berlin and Bridgewater, the railroad later purchased the New Berlin Branch from the New York, Ontario and Western Railway in 1941. The addition of this line extending from New Berlin Jct near Sidney to New Berlin and Edmeston more than doubled the Unadilla Valley Railway's trackage to 49 miles.

The railroad purchased its first diesel locomotive from General Electric in 1947, but continued running steam locomotives until 1956.
