= Bridgewater High School =

Bridgewater High School may refer to several schools throughout the world:

- Bridgewater High School (Tasmania) in Bridgewater, Tasmania, Australia
- Bridgewater High School (Warrington) in Appleton, Warrington, Cheshire, England
- Bridgewater High School (South Dakota) in Bridgewater, South Dakota, United States

== See also ==
- East Bridgewater High School in East Bridgewater, Massachusetts, United States
- Bridgewater-Raritan High School in Bridgewater, New Jersey, United States
- Bridgewater-Raynham Regional High School in Bridgewater, Massachusetts, United States
- West Bridgewater Middle-Senior High School in West Bridgewater, Massachusetts, United States
