= Bridgewater House =

Bridgewater House may refer to:

- Bridgewater House, Manchester
- Bridgewater House, Runcorn, Cheshire
- Bridgewater House, Westminster, London
- A planned BBC studio in Bristol, South West England; see Broadcasting House, Bristol
