= Bridgewater, Maine =

Town in Maine, United States

- Town
- Location of Bridgewater, Maine
- Coordinates: 46°23′02″N 67°51′52″W
- Country: United States
- State: Maine
- County: Aroostook

Area
  - Total: 38.97 sq mi (100.93 km^{2})
  - Land: 38.80 sq mi (100.49 km^{2})
  - Water: 0.17 sq mi (0.44 km^{2})
- Elevation: 423 ft (129 m)

Population (2020)
  - Total: 532
  - Density: 14/sq mi (5.3/km^{2})
- Time zone: UTC-5 (Eastern (EST))
  - Summer (DST): UTC-4 (EDT)
- ZIP code: 04735
- Area code: 207
- FIPS code: 23-07065
- GNIS feature ID: 582367

Bridgewater is a town in Aroostook County, Maine, United States. The population was 532 at the 2020 census.

== Geography ==
According to the United States Census Bureau, the town has a total area of 38.97 square miles (100.93 km^{2}), of which 38.80 square miles (100.49 km^{2}) is land and 0.17 square miles (0.44 km^{2}) is water.

=== Climate ===
This climatic region is typified by large seasonal temperature differences, with warm to hot (and often humid) summers and cold (sometimes severely cold) winters. According to the Köppen Climate Classification system, Bridgewater has a humid continental climate, abbreviated "Dfb" on climate maps.

Climate data for Bridgewater, Maine (1991–2020 normals, extremes 1959–2020)
Month	Jan	Feb	Mar	Apr	May	Jun	Jul	Aug	Sep	Oct	Nov	Dec	Year
Record high °F (°C)	54 (12)	61 (16)	78 (26)	86 (30)	95 (35)	95 (35)	95 (35)	96 (36)	92 (33)	83 (28)	67 (19)	56 (13)	96 (36)
Mean maximum °F (°C)	43.6 (6.4)	43.2 (6.2)	52.5 (11.4)	69.9 (21.1)	82.6 (28.1)	87.5 (30.8)	89.1 (31.7)	88.3 (31.3)	83.1 (28.4)	72.4 (22.4)	59.7 (15.4)	47.6 (8.7)	91.3 (32.9)
Mean daily maximum °F (°C)	22.1 (−5.5)	25.7 (−3.5)	36.0 (2.2)	49.6 (9.8)	64.7 (18.2)	73.4 (23.0)	78.0 (25.6)	76.7 (24.8)	68.4 (20.2)	54.3 (12.4)	40.3 (4.6)	28.1 (−2.2)	51.4 (10.8)
Daily mean °F (°C)	11.6 (−11.3)	14.1 (−9.9)	25.2 (−3.8)	38.6 (3.7)	52.0 (11.1)	60.9 (16.1)	66.2 (19.0)	64.4 (18.0)	56.3 (13.5)	44.4 (6.9)	32.5 (0.3)	19.6 (−6.9)	40.5 (4.7)
Mean daily minimum °F (°C)	1.2 (−17.1)	2.5 (−16.4)	14.3 (−9.8)	27.7 (−2.4)	39.2 (4.0)	48.5 (9.2)	54.4 (12.4)	52.2 (11.2)	44.3 (6.8)	34.6 (1.4)	24.8 (−4.0)	11.2 (−11.6)	29.6 (−1.4)
Mean minimum °F (°C)	−25.2 (−31.8)	−23.4 (−30.8)	−12.7 (−24.8)	11.9 (−11.2)	26.1 (−3.3)	34.3 (1.3)	42.1 (5.6)	38.5 (3.6)	28.3 (−2.1)	20.8 (−6.2)	5.0 (−15.0)	−13.4 (−25.2)	−28.2 (−33.4)
Record low °F (°C)	−43 (−42)	−42 (−41)	−35 (−37)	−14 (−26)	18 (−8)	24 (−4)	31 (−1)	28 (−2)	19 (−7)	12 (−11)	−9 (−23)	−38 (−39)	−43 (−42)
Average precipitation inches (mm)	3.34 (85)	2.66 (68)	3.07 (78)	3.42 (87)	3.66 (93)	4.50 (114)	4.13 (105)	3.80 (97)	3.51 (89)	4.52 (115)	3.91 (99)	4.03 (102)	44.55 (1,132)
Average snowfall inches (cm)	22.2 (56)	21.0 (53)	16.9 (43)	4.9 (12)	0.5 (1.3)	0.0 (0.0)	0.0 (0.0)	0.0 (0.0)	0.1 (0.25)	0.7 (1.8)	5.8 (15)	22.3 (57)	94.4 (239.35)
Average precipitation days (≥ 0.01 in)	11.6	9.6	10.4	11.4	12.8	12.5	13.2	11.1	10.3	12.4	11.4	12.2	138.9
Average snowy days (≥ 0.1 in)	9.6	8.1	6.5	1.8	0.2	0.0	0.0	0.0	0.0	0.4	3.0	8.4	38.0
Source 1: National Weather Service
Source 2: NOAA

== Demographics ==
Historical population
Census	Pop.	Note	%±
1860	491		—
1870	605		23.2%
1880	722		19.3%
1890	946		31.0%
1900	1,179		24.6%
1910	1,238		5.0%
1920	1,212		−2.1%
1930	1,235		1.9%
1940	1,267		2.6%
1950	1,279		0.9%
1960	999		−21.9%
1970	895		−10.4%
1980	742		−17.1%
1990	647		−12.8%
2000	612		−5.4%
2010	610		−0.3%
2020	532		−12.8%
U.S. Decennial Census

=== 2010 census ===
As of the census of 2010, there were 610 people, 263 households, and 175 families living in the town. The population density was 15.7 inhabitants per square mile (6.1/km^{2}). There were 326 housing units at an average density of 8.4 per square mile (3.2/km^{2}). The racial makeup of the town was 96.7% White, 0.7% Native American, 0.2% Asian, 1.0% from other races, and 1.5% from two or more races. Hispanic or Latino of any race were 1.1% of the population.

There were 263 households, of which 25.9% had children under the age of 18 living with them, 55.5% were married couples living together, 8.4% had a female householder with no husband present, 2.7% had a male householder with no wife present, and 33.5% were non-families. 29.7% of all households were made up of individuals, and 14.4% had someone living alone who was 65 years of age or older. The average household size was 2.32 and the average family size was 2.90.

The median age in the town was 46.7 years. 22.5% of residents were under the age of 18; 4.4% were between the ages of 18 and 24; 20.7% were from 25 to 44; 32.7% were from 45 to 64; and 19.8% were 65 years of age or older. The gender makeup of the town was 50.0% male and 50.0% female.

=== 2000 census ===
As of the census of 2000, there were 612 people, 248 households, and 173 families living in the town. The population density was 15.8 inhabitants per square mile (6.1/km^{2}). There were 316 housing units at an average density of 8.1 per square mile (3.1/km^{2}). The racial makeup of the town was 98.04% White, 0.49% Native American, 0.65% from other races, and 0.82% from two or more races. Hispanic or Latino of any race were 0.65% of the population.

There were 248 households, out of which 27.0% had children under the age of 18 living with them, 59.3% were married couples living together, 6.0% had a female householder with no husband present, and 30.2% were non-families. 25.4% of all households were made up of individuals, and 12.9% had someone living alone who was 65 years of age or older. The average household size was 2.47 and the average family size was 2.97.

In the town, the population was spread out, with 22.2% under the age of 18, 5.6% from 18 to 24, 25.0% from 25 to 44, 26.6% from 45 to 64, and 20.6% who were 65 years of age or older. The median age was 43 years. For every 100 females, there were 101.3 males. For every 100 females age 18 and over, there were 94.3 males.

The median income for a household in the town was $27,679, and the median income for a family was $33,125. Males had a median income of $24,167 versus $21,190 for females. The per capita income for the town was $15,534. About 12.7% of families and 17.6% of the population were below the poverty line, including 23.7% of those under age 18 and 16.5% of those age 65 or over.

== History and settlement ==
In 1820 the State of Maine was officially separated from Massachusetts, and at that time the name Bridgewater was applied to the Township. The area north of Bangor had been previously divided into 6 mile square townships, and in 1803 the future Bridgewater Township was subdivided into two 3 mile x 6 mile areas, each designated a "grant" area to fund public academies in Portland and Bridgewater, respectively. The town of Bridgewater was incorporated on March 2, 1858.

== Notable people ==
- Jim Gerritsen, organic potato farmer and anti-GMO activist
- Frank M. Hume, commanding officer of the 103rd Infantry, 26th Division during World War I
- Amber E. Robinson (1867-1961), teacher, poet, reporter, and social reformer
- Gerald Evan Williams, World War II Air Force officer

== Sites of interest ==
- Bridgewater Town Hall and Jail
