= Bridgewater (East Indiaman) =

Four ships named Bridgewater sailed as East Indiamen for the British East India Company (EIC):

- Bridgewater (1719 EIC ship) was launched in 1719, made four voyages for the EIC, and was sold in 1731.
- Bridgewater (1769 EIC ship) was launched in 1769, made four voyages for the EIC, and was sold in 1782 for breaking up. On 8 March 1779 as she was sailing from Saint Helena back to England, she encountered and repelled an attack by the New Hampshire privateer Hampden.
- Bridgewater (1785 EIC ship) was launched in 1785, and made six complete voyages as a regular ship for the EIC and one as an extra ship; she was lost at sea in 1805 during her eighth voyage.
- Bridgewater (1812 EIC ship) was launched in 1812, made eight complete voyages as a regular ship for the EIC, and was condemned at Calcutta in 1831 on her ninth after she was dismasted in a hurricane.
