= Bridgewater (CDP), New York =

Bridgewater, New York
- Hamlet and CDP
- Location in Oneida County and the state of New York.
- Coordinates: 42°52.8′N 75°15.0′W
- Country: United States
- State: New York
- County: Oneida
- Town: Bridgewater
- Incorporated: April 21, 1825
- Dissolved: December 31, 2014

Area
  - Total: 0.97 sq mi (2.52 km^{2})
  - Land: 0.97 sq mi (2.52 km^{2})
  - Water: 0 sq mi (0.00 km^{2})
- Elevation: 1,211 ft (369 m)

Population (2020)
  - Total: 516
  - Density: 531.2/sq mi (205.09/km^{2})
- Time zone: UTC-5 (Eastern (EST))
  - Summer (DST): UTC-4 (EDT)
- ZIP Codes: 13313 (Bridgewater); 13318 (Cassville)
- Area code: 315
- FIPS code: 36-08169
- GNIS feature ID: 2391559

Bridgewater is a hamlet (and census-designated place) in Oneida County, New York, United States. The population was 470 at the 2010 census.

The hamlet is within the Town of Bridgewater at the junction of U.S. Route 20 and N.Y. Route 8. It was an incorporated village from 1825 to 2014.

== History ==
The village was incorporated in 1825. The Unadilla Valley Railway had its northern terminus at Bridgewater where it connected to a branch line of the Delaware, Lackawanna and Western Railroad.

The Brick Store Building and Bridgewater Railroad Station are listed on the National Register of Historic Places.

On March 18, 2014, voters approved a referendum by a vote of 40 to 8 to dissolve the village on December 31, 2014. As of January 1, 2015, the Town of Bridgewater assumed responsibility for the area of the former village.

== Geography ==
Bridgewater is located at 42°52.8′N 75°15.0′W (42.8793, -75.2505).

According to the United States Census Bureau, the hamlet has a total area of 0.6 square mile (1.6 km^{2}), all land.

The hamlet is at the border of Madison and Otsego counties.

Bridgewater is at the intersection of U.S. Route 20 and NY 8.

== Demographics ==
Historical population
| Census | Pop. | Note | %± |
|---|---|---|---|
| 1840 | 350 | | — |
| 1860 | 306 | | — |
| 1870 | 230 | | −24.8% |
| 1880 | 224 | | −2.6% |
| 1900 | 269 | | — |
| 1910 | 245 | | −8.9% |
| 1920 | 232 | | −5.3% |
| 1930 | 228 | | −1.7% |
| 1940 | 238 | | 4.4% |
| 1950 | 309 | | 29.8% |
| 1960 | 373 | | 20.7% |
| 1970 | 601 | | 61.1% |
| 1980 | 578 | | −3.8% |
| 1990 | 537 | | −7.1% |
| 2000 | 579 | | 7.8% |
| 2010 | 470 | | −18.8% |
| 2020 | 516 | | 9.8% |
U.S. Decennial Census

As of the census of 2000, there were 579 people, 204 households, and 151 families residing in what was then a village. The population density was 943.7 inhabitants per square mile (364.4/km^{2}). There were 221 housing units at an average density of 360.2 per square mile (139.1/km^{2}). The racial makeup of the village was 98.45% White, 0.69% Black or African American, and 0.86% from two or more races. Hispanic or Latino of any race were 1.90% of the population.

There were 204 households, out of which 43.6% had children under the age of 18 living with them, 53.4% were married couples living together, 12.7% had a female householder with no husband present, and 25.5% were non-families. 22.1% of all households were made up of individuals, and 8.8% had someone living alone who was 65 years of age or older. The average household size was 2.84 and the average family size was 3.18.

In the village, the population was spread out, with 34.0% under the age of 18, 9.5% from 18 to 24, 26.8% from 25 to 44, 20.7% from 45 to 64, and 9.0% who were 65 years of age or older. The median age was 31 years. For every 100 females, there were 94.3 males. For every 100 females age 18 and over, there were 96.9 males.

The median income for a household in the village was $27,788, and the median income for a family was $28,409. Males had a median income of $23,125 versus $21,071 for females. The per capita income for the village was $12,995. About 11.3% of families and 12.6% of the population were below the poverty line, including 15.6% of those under age 18 and 18.0% of those age 65 or over.

== Notable person ==
- Asher Tyler, former U.S. Congressman

== See also ==
- Bridgewater Railroad Station
