= Bridgewater Center, Ohio =

Unincorporated community in Ohio, U.S.

Coordinates: 41°39′29″N 84°37′51″W

Bridgewater Center is an unincorporated community in Williams County, in the U.S. state of Ohio.

== History ==
Bridgewater Center had its start in 1844 when a gristmill and sawmill were built there. The community was named for its location near the geographical center of Bridgewater Township. A post office was established at Bridgewater Center in 1846, and remained in operation until 1903. Bridgewater Center was platted in 1871.
