= Bridgewater, New York =

- Town
- Location in Oneida County and the state of New York.

- Location of New York in the United States
- Coordinates: 42°53′N 75°15′W
- Country: United States
- State: New York
- County: Oneida

Government
  - Town Supervisor: Dale DeKing (R)
  - Town Council: Members: Richard Foster (R); Thomas Meininger (R); Donald McDonald (R); Christopher K. Haar (R)

Area
  - Total: 23.86 sq mi (61.79 km^{2})
  - Land: 23.85 sq mi (61.76 km^{2})
  - Water: 0.012 sq mi (0.03 km^{2})

Population (2010)
  - Total: 1,522
  - Estimate (2016): 1,492
  - Density: 62.6/sq mi (24.16/km^{2})
- Time zone: UTC-5 (EST)
  - Summer (DST): UTC-4 (EDT)
- ZIP Codes: 13313 (Bridgewater); 13318 (Cassville); 13322 (Clayville); 13480 (Waterville); 13491 (West Winfield)
- FIPS code: 36-065-08180
- Website: Town of Bridgewater

Bridgewater is a town in Oneida County, New York, United States. The population was 1,522 at the 2010 census.

The Town of Bridgewater is on the southern border of the county. The town has a former village called Bridgewater near the southern town line. The town and hamlet were named after the Duke of Bridgewater.

== History ==
The first settlement took place circa 1788. The Town of Bridgewater was formed from the Town of Sangerfield in 1797. Bridgewater was the first municipality in New York State to elect an African American mayor, Everett Holmes, in 1974. Bridgewater hosts a BMX track in the town park, which has seen many champions throughout the years and in 2003 took home a BMX state champion. This track has existed for over 25 years working

== Geography ==
According to the United States Census Bureau, the town has a total area of 23.9 square miles (61.8 km^{2}), all land. U.S. 20 crosses the southern part of the town, where it intersects NY 8.

The southern town line is the border of Madison and Otsego counties. The eastern town line is the border of Herkimer County.

== Demographics ==
Historical population
Census	Pop.	Note	%±
1800	1,061		—
1810	1,170		10.3%
1820	1,533		31.0%
1830	1,608		4.9%
1840	1,418		−11.8%
1850	1,308		−7.8%
1860	1,261		−3.6%
1870	1,258		−0.2%
1880	1,218		−3.2%
1890	1,073		−11.9%
1900	931		−13.2%
1910	832		−10.6%
1920	746		−10.3%
1930	730		−2.1%
1940	743		1.8%
1950	806		8.5%
1960	966		19.9%
1970	1,251		29.5%
1980	1,455		16.3%
1990	1,591		9.3%
2000	1,671		5.0%
2010	1,522		−8.9%
2016 (est.)	1,492	▼	−2.0%
U.S. Decennial Census

At the 2000 census there were 1,671 people, 596 households, and 454 families in the town. The population density was 70.1 inhabitants per square mile (27.1/km^{2}). There were 639 housing units at an average density of 26.8 per square mile (10.3/km^{2}). The racial makeup of the town was 97.31% White, 0.78% Black or African American, 0.78% Asian, 0.18% from other races, and 0.96% from two or more races. Hispanic or Latino of any race were 1.02%.

Of the 596 households 42.1% had children under the age of 18 living with them, 57.0% were married couples living together, 10.7% had a female householder with no husband present, and 23.8% were non-families. 19.5% of households were one person and 7.2% were one person aged 65 or older. The average household size was 2.80 and the average family size was 3.12.

The age distribution was 31.1% under the age of 18, 7.8% from 18 to 24, 31.7% from 25 to 44, 21.2% from 45 to 64, and 8.2% 65 or older. The median age was 34 years. For every 100 females, there were 104.5 males. For every 100 females age 18 and over, there were 99.8 males.

The median household income was $30,724 and the median family income was $33,750. Males had a median income of $29,074 versus $20,956 for females. The per capita income for the town was $13,875. About 7.9% of families and 10.1% of the population were below the poverty line, including 10.5% of those under age 18 and 9.1% of those age 65 or over.

== Communities and locations in the Town of Bridgewater ==
- Babcock Hill – A hamlet in the northeastern part of the town.
- Bridgewater – A hamlet on US Route 20 near the southern town line. It was an incorporated village, but dissolved in 2014.
- Hobin Corners – A hamlet near the western town line on US Route 20.
- Mapledale – A hamlet near the center of the town.
- North Bridgewater – A hamlet in the northern part of the town on NY Route 8.
- Tassel Hill – Highest point in Oneida County. Located in the northwest part of the town, on the borders of Marshall, Paris, and Sangerfield, townships.
