= Bridgewater Center Historic District =

Historic district in Connecticut, United States

- U.S. National Register of Historic Places
- U.S. Historic district
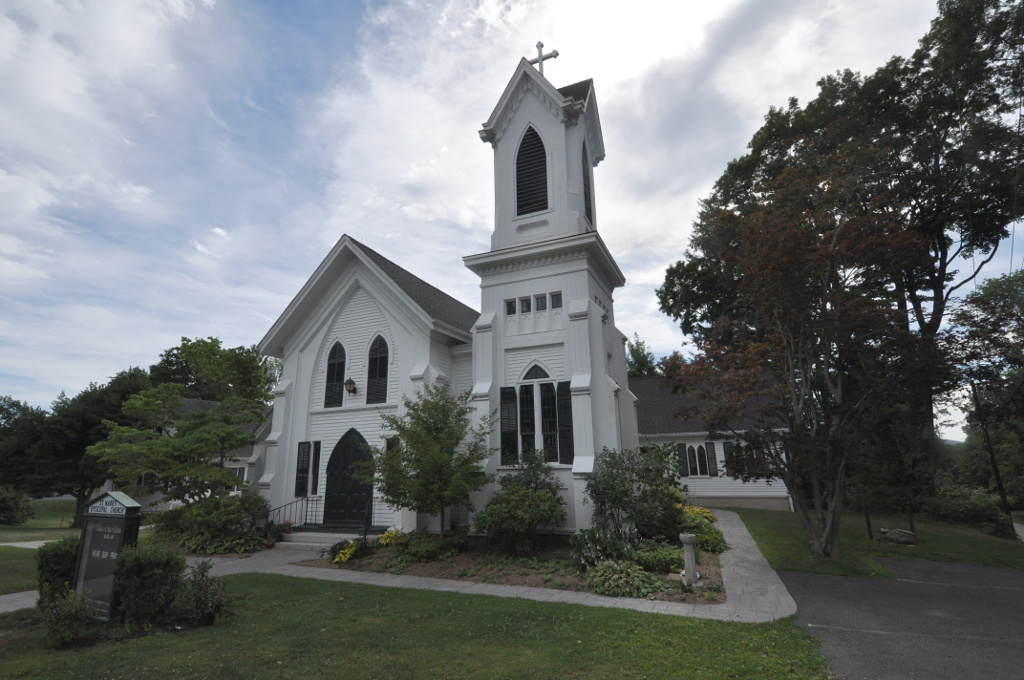
- St. Mark's Episcopal Church

- Location within Connecticut Location within the United States
- Location: Roughly along Main Street, Warner Road, Clapboard Road and Hat Shop Hill, Bridgewater, Connecticut
- Coordinates: 41°32′6″N 73°21′59″W
- Area: 50 acres (20 ha)
- Architectural style: Federal, Greek Revival, et.al.
- NRHP reference No.: 00000816
- Added to NRHP: July 19, 2000

Bridgewater Center Historic District encompasses the traditional town center of Bridgewater, Connecticut. Centered at the Junction of Main Street with Clapboard and Hat Shop Hill Roads, it developed in the early 19th century as a civic center, even before the town's 1856 incorporation from New Milford. The architecture of the center is largely reflective of the first half of the 19th century, including Greek Revival and Federal style buildings. It was listed on the National Register of Historic Places in 2000.

== Description and history ==
The town of Bridgewater was original part of New Milford, and was settled in the mid-18th century. It was formally separated from New Milford in 1856. The center village began to take shape with the construction in 1807 of the Congregational Church at a geographically central part of "The Neck", as the portion of New Milford east of the Housatonic River was then known. The village soon grew, mainly to the area just south of the church along Main Street. The Center Park, between Main and Center Streets, which functions as a town green, was laid in 1856 after the town's incorporation. The village benefitted economically from hat manufacturers, whose operations were to the west (further along Hat Shop Hill Road) and supported a bustling town center. The area has seen relatively little new development since the early 20th century.

The historic district extends mainly north-south along Main Street, from Warner Street in the south to a stream crossing in the north. It extends a short way west on Hat Shop Hill Road, which forms a four-way junction with Main Street and Clapboard Road near the center of the district. There are more than 60 historic buildings in the district, including the 1807 Congregation church (restyled with Greek Revival elements in 1842. Also at that road junction is St. Mark's Episcopal Church, a distinctive example of Gothic Revival architecture in wood. The present and former town halls are also both in the district, as is a distinctive Queen Anne commercial block on the west side of South Main Street. One of the district'st latest historic buildings is the 1929 Burnham School.

== See also ==
- National Register of Historic Places listings in Litchfield County, Connecticut
