= 2006 United States gubernatorial elections =

- November 7, 2006

38 governorships 36 states; 2 territories
	Majority party	Minority party
Party	Democratic	Republican
Seats before	22	28
Seats after	28	22
Seat change	▲6	▼6
Popular vote	33,448,842	29,386,626
Percentage	50.29%	44.18%
Seats up	14	22
Seats won	20	16
- Map of the results Republican hold Democratic hold Democratic gain No election

United States gubernatorial elections were held on November 7, 2006, in 36 states and two territories. The elections coincided with the midterm elections of the United States Senate and the United States House of Representatives.

Democrats won open Republican-held governorships in Arkansas, Colorado, Massachusetts, New York, and Ohio; and they defeated Republican incumbent Bob Ehrlich in Maryland while retaining all of their seats, including their lone open seat in Iowa. Meanwhile, Republicans held open seats in Florida, Idaho, and Nevada, as well as Alaska, where incumbent governor Frank Murkowski was defeated in the primary. Voters in the United States territories of Guam (then-Republican) and the United States Virgin Islands (then-Democratic, but term-limited) also chose their governors and voters elected a new mayor for the District of Columbia, the District's chief executive.

As part of the 2006 Democratic sweep, Democrats did not lose a single incumbent or open seat to the Republicans in any congressional or gubernatorial contest. The results of the 2006 elections gave Republicans 22 governors to the Democrats' 28, a reversal of the numbers held by the respective parties prior to the elections. Republicans held the majority of governorships from 1995 until 2007.

As of 2026, this election marked the last time that the Democratic Party won gubernatorial elections in Oklahoma, Tennessee, or Wyoming. This is also the very last gubernatorial election cycle in which the Republican Party won governorships in California, Connecticut, Hawaii, Minnesota, and Rhode Island to date.

== Election ratings ==
State	Incumbent	Last race	Sabato November 6, 2006	Rothenberg November 2, 2006	Cook November 6, 2006	RCP November 6, 2006	Result
Alabama	Bob Riley	49.17% R	Likely R	Safe R	Safe R	Safe R	Riley; 57.45% R
Alaska	Frank Murkowski	55.85% R	Leans R	Leans R	Tossup	Leans R	Palin; 48.33% R
Arizona	Janet Napolitano	46.19% D	Safe D	Safe D	Safe D	Safe D	Napolitano; 62.58% D
Arkansas	Mike Huckabee (Term-limited)	53.02% R	Likely D (flip)	Likely D (flip)	Leans D (flip)	Leans D (flip)	Beebe; 55.61% D (flip)
California	Arnold Schwarzenegger	48.58% R	Likely R	Safe R	Leans R	Likely R	Schwarzenegger; 55.88% R
Colorado	Bill Owens (Term-limited)	62.62% R	Likely D (flip)	Likely D (flip)	Likely D (flip)	Likely D (flip)	Ritter; 56.99 D (flip)
Connecticut	Jodi Rell	56.10% R	Safe R	Safe R	Safe R	Safe R	Rell; 63.21% R
Florida	Jeb Bush (Term-limited)	56.01% R	Leans R	Likely R	Leans R	Leans R	Crist; 52.20%
Georgia	Sonny Perdue	51.42% R	Likely R	Safe R	Leans R	Likely R	Perdue; 57.95 R
Hawaii	Linda Lingle	51.56% R	Safe R	Safe R	Safe R	Safe R	Lingle; 62.53% R
Idaho	Jim Risch (Retired)	56.28% R	Tilt R	Leans R	Tossup	Tossup	Otter; 52.67 R
Illinois	Rod Blagojevich	52.19% D	Leans D	Likely D	Leans D	Leans D	Blagojevich; 49.79% D
Iowa	Tom Vilsack (Retired)	52.69% D	Leans D	Leans D	Tossup	Leans D	Culver; 54.02% D
Kansas	Kathleen Sebelius	52.87% D	Likely D	Safe D	Safe D	Likely D	Sebelius; 57.90% D
Maine	John Baldacci	47.1% D	Leans D	Likely D	Leans D	Leans D	Baldacci; 38.11% D
Maryland	Bob Ehrlich	51.55% R	Leans D (flip)	Leans D (flip)	Tossup	Tossup	O'Malley; 52.69% D (flip)
Massachusetts	Mitt Romney (Retired)	49.18% R	Likely D (flip)	Likely D (flip)	Leans D (flip)	Likely D (flip)	Patrick; 55.03% D (flip)
Michigan	Jennifer Granholm	51.42% D	Leans D	Likely D	Tossup	Leans D	Granholm; 56.36% D
Minnesota	Tim Pawlenty	44.37% R	Tilt D (flip)	Tossup	Tossup	Tossup	Pawlenty; 46.69% R
Nebraska	Dave Heineman	68.68% R	Safe R	Safe R	Safe R	Safe R	Heineman; 73.40% R
Nevada	Kenny Guinn (Term-limited)	68.24% R	Leans R	Tossup	Tossup	Leans R	Gibbons; 47.93% R
New Hampshire	John Lynch	51.02% D	Safe D	Safe D	Safe D	Safe D	Lynch; 74.01% D
New Mexico	Bill Richardson	55.49% D	Safe D	Safe D	Safe D	Safe D	Richardson; 68.82% D
New York	George Pataki (Retired)	49.40% R	Safe D (flip)	Likely D (flip)	Safe D (flip)	Safe D (flip)	Spitzer; 65.70% D (flip)
Ohio	Bob Taft (Term-limited)	57.76% R	Likely D (flip)	Likely D (flip)	Safe D (flip)	Likely D (flip)	Strickland; 60.54% D (flip)
Oklahoma	Brad Henry	43.27% D	Safe D	Safe D	Safe D	Safe D	Henry; 66.50% D
Oregon	Ted Kulongoski	49.03% D	Tilt D	Leans D	Tossup	Leans D	Kulongoski; 50.73% D
Pennsylvania	Ed Rendell	53.41% D	Safe D	Safe D	Safe D	Likely D	Rendell; 60.36% D
Rhode Island	Donald Carcieri	54.76% R	Leans R	Leans R	Tossup	Likely R	Carcieri; 51.01% R
South Carolina	Mark Sanford	52.85% R	Likely R	Safe R	Likely R	Safe R	Sanford; 55.12% R
South Dakota	Mike Rounds	56.77% R	Safe R	Safe R	Safe R	Safe R	Rounds; 61.69% R
Tennessee	Phil Bredesen	50.65% D	Safe D	Safe D	Safe D	Likely D	Bredesen; 68.60% D
Texas	Rick Perry	57.81% R	Safe R	Likely R	Likely R	Likely R	Perry; 39.03% R
Vermont	Jim Douglas	58.70% R	Safe R	Safe R	Likely R	Safe R	Douglas; 56.36% R
Wisconsin	Jim Doyle	45.09% D	Leans D	Tossup	Tossup	Leans D	Doyle; 52.70% D
Wyoming	Dave Freudenthal	49.96% D	Safe D	Safe D	Safe D	Safe D	Freudenthal; 69.99 D

== Race summary ==
=== States ===
State	Incumbent	Party	First elected	Result	Candidates
Alabama	Bob Riley	Republican	2002	Incumbent re-elected.	▌ ✓ Bob Riley (Republican) 57.5%; ▌Lucy Baxley (Democratic) 41.6%
Alaska	Frank Murkowski	Republican	2002	Incumbent lost renomination. New governor elected. Republican hold.	▌ ✓ Sarah Palin (Republican) 48.3%; ▌Tony Knowles (Democratic) 41.0%; ▌Andrew Halcro (Independent) 9.5%
Arizona	Janet Napolitano	Democratic	2002	Incumbent re-elected.	▌ ✓ Janet Napolitano (Democratic) 62.6%; ▌Len Munsil (Republican) 35.4%; ▌Barry Hess (Libertarian) 2.0%
Arkansas	Mike Huckabee	Republican	1996 (Note: Huckabee took office after his predecessor (Jim Guy Tucker) resigned. He was subsequently elected in the 1998 Arkansas gubernatorial election.)	Incumbent term-limited. New governor elected. Democratic gain.	▌ ✓ Mike Beebe (Democratic) 55.6%; ▌Asa Hutchinson (Republican) 40.7%; ▌Rod Bryan (Independent) 2.0%; ▌Jim Lendall (Green) 1.7%
California	Arnold Schwarzenegger	Republican	2003 (recall)	Incumbent re-elected.	▌ ✓ Arnold Schwarzenegger (Republican) 55.9%; ▌Phil Angelides (Democratic) 38.9%; ▌Peter Camejo (Green) 2.4%; ▌Art Olivier (Libertarian) 1.3%
Colorado	Bill Owens	Republican	1998	Incumbent term-limited. New governor elected. Democratic gain.	▌ ✓ Bill Ritter (Democratic) 57.0%; ▌Bob Beauprez (Republican) 40.2%; ▌Dawn Winkler (Libertarian) 1.5%
Connecticut	Jodi Rell	Republican	2004 (Note: Rell took office after her predecessor (John G. Rowland) resigned.)	Incumbent elected to full term.	▌ ✓ Jodi Rell (Republican) 63.2%; ▌John DeStefano Jr. (Democratic) 35.5%
Florida	Jeb Bush	Republican	1998	Incumbent term-limited. New governor elected. Republican hold.	▌ ✓ Charlie Crist (Republican) 52.2%; ▌Jim Davis (Democratic) 45.1%; ▌Max Linn (Reform) 1.9%
Georgia	Sonny Perdue	Republican	2002	Incumbent re-elected.	▌ ✓ Sonny Perdue (Republican) 58.0%; ▌Mark Taylor (Democratic) 38.2%; ▌Gary Hayes (Libertarian) 3.8%
Hawaii	Linda Lingle	Republican	2002	Incumbent re-elected.	▌ ✓ Linda Lingle (Republican) 62.5%; ▌Randy Iwase (Democratic) 35.4%; ▌James Brewer Jr. (Green) 1.6%
Idaho	Jim Risch	Republican	2006 (Note: Risch took office after his predecessor (Dirk Kempthorne) resigned.)	Incumbent retired. New governor elected. Republican hold.	▌ ✓ Butch Otter (Republican) 52.7%; ▌Jerry Brady (Democratic) 44.1%; ▌Marvin Richardson (Constitution) 1.6%; ▌Ted Dunlap (Libertarian) 1.6%
Illinois	Rod Blagojevich	Democratic	2002	Incumbent re-elected.	▌ ✓ Rod Blagojevich (Democratic) 49.8%; ▌Judy Baar Topinka (Republican) 39.3%; ▌Rich Whitney (Green) 10.4%
Iowa	Tom Vilsack	Democratic	1998	Incumbent retired. New governor elected. Democratic hold.	▌ ✓ Chet Culver (Democratic) 54.0%; ▌Jim Nussle (Republican) 44.4%
Kansas	Kathleen Sebelius	Democratic	2002	Incumbent re-elected.	▌ ✓ Kathleen Sebelius (Democratic) 57.9%; ▌Jim Barnett (Republican) 40.4%; ▌Carl Kramer (Libertarian) 1.0%
Maine	John Baldacci	Democratic	2002	Incumbent re-elected.	▌ ✓ John Baldacci (Democratic) 38.1%; ▌Chandler Woodcock (Republican) 30.2%; ▌Barbara Merrill (Independent) 21.6%; ▌Pat LaMarche (Green) 9.6%
Maryland	Bob Ehrlich	Republican	2002	Incumbent lost re-election. New governor elected. Democratic gain.	▌ ✓ Martin O'Malley (Democratic) 52.7%; ▌Bob Ehrlich (Republican) 46.2%
Massachusetts	Mitt Romney	Republican	2002	Incumbent retired. New governor elected. Democratic gain.	▌ ✓ Deval Patrick (Democratic) 55.6%; ▌Kerry Healey (Republican) 35.3%; ▌Christy Mihos (Independent) 7.0%; ▌Grace Ross (Green) 2.0%
Michigan	Jennifer Granholm	Democratic	2002	Incumbent re-elected.	▌ ✓ Jennifer Granholm (Democratic) 56.4%; ▌Dick DeVos (Republican) 42.3%
Minnesota	Tim Pawlenty	Republican	2002	Incumbent re-elected.	▌ ✓ Tim Pawlenty (Republican) 46.7%; ▌Mike Hatch (DFL) 45.7%; ▌Peter Hutchinson (Independence) 6.4%
Nebraska	Dave Heineman	Republican	2005 (Note: Heineman took office after his predecessor (Mike Johanns) resigned.)	Incumbent elected to full term.	▌ ✓ Dave Heineman (Republican) 73.4%; ▌David Hahn (Democratic) 24.5%
Nevada	Kenny Guinn	Republican	1998	Incumbent term-limited. New governor elected. Republican hold.	▌ ✓ Jim Gibbons (Republican) 47.9%; ▌Dina Titus (Democratic) 43.9%; ▌None of These Candidates 3.6%; ▌Christopher Hansen (Independent American) 3.4%; ▌Craig Bergland (Green) 1.2%
New Hampshire	John Lynch	Democratic	2004	Incumbent re-elected.	▌ ✓ John Lynch (Democratic) 74.0%; ▌Jim Coburn (Republican) 25.8%
New Mexico	Bill Richardson	Democratic	2002	Incumbent re-elected.	▌ ✓ Bill Richardson (Democratic) 68.8%; ▌John Dendahl (Republican) 31.2%
New York	George Pataki	Republican	1994	Incumbent retired. New governor elected. Democratic gain.	▌ ✓ Eliot Spitzer (Democratic) 65.7%; ▌John Faso (Republican) 27.1%
Ohio	Bob Taft	Republican	1998	Incumbent term-limited. New governor elected. Democratic gain.	▌ ✓ Ted Strickland (Democratic) 60.5%; ▌Ken Blackwell (Republican) 36.7%; ▌Bill Peirce (Libertarian) 1.8%; ▌Bob Fitrakis (Green) 1.0%
Oklahoma	Brad Henry	Democratic	2002	Incumbent re-elected.	▌ ✓ Brad Henry (Democratic) 66.5%; ▌Ernest Istook (Republican) 33.5%
Oregon	Ted Kulongoski	Democratic	2002	Incumbent re-elected.	▌ ✓ Ted Kulongoski (Democratic) 50.7%; ▌Ron Saxton (Republican) 42.7%; ▌Mary Starrett (Constitution) 3.6%; ▌Joe Keating (Pacific Green) 1.5%; ▌Richard Morley (Libertarian) 1.2%
Pennsylvania	Ed Rendell	Democratic	2002	Incumbent re-elected.	▌ ✓ Ed Rendell (Democratic) 60.3%; ▌Lynn Swann (Republican) 39.6%
Rhode Island	Donald Carcieri	Republican	2002	Incumbent re-elected.	▌ ✓ Donald Carcieri (Republican) 51.0%; ▌Charles Fogarty (Democratic) 49.0%
South Carolina	Mark Sanford	Republican	2002	Incumbent re-elected.	▌ ✓ Mark Sanford (Republican) 55.1%; ▌Tommy Moore (Democratic) 44.8%
South Dakota	Mike Rounds	Republican	2002	Incumbent re-elected.	▌ ✓ Mike Rounds (Republican) 61.7%; ▌Jack Billion (Democratic) 36.1%; ▌Steven J. Willis (Constitution) 1.2%
Tennessee	Phil Bredesen	Democratic	2002	Incumbent re-elected.	▌ ✓ Phil Bredesen (Democratic) 68.6%; ▌Jim Bryson (Republican) 29.7%
Texas	Rick Perry	Republican	2000 (Note: Perry took office after his predecessor (George W. Bush) resigned. He was subsequently elected in the 2002 Texas gubernatorial election.)	Incumbent re-elected.	▌ ✓ Rick Perry (Republican) 39.0%; ▌Chris Bell (Democratic) 29.8%; ▌Carole K. Strayhorn (Independent) 18.1%; ▌Richard Friedman (Independent) 12.4%
Vermont	Jim Douglas	Republican	2002	Incumbent re-elected.	▌ ✓ Jim Douglas (Republican) 56.3%; ▌Scudder Parker (Democratic) 41.1%
Wisconsin	Jim Doyle	Democratic	2002	Incumbent re-elected.	▌ ✓ Jim Doyle (Democratic) 52.8%; ▌Mark Green (Republican) 45.4%; ▌Nelson Eisman (Green) 1.9%
Wyoming	Dave Freudenthal	Democratic	2002	Incumbent re-elected.	▌ ✓ Dave Freudenthal (Democratic) 70.0%; ▌Ray Hunkins (Republican) 30.0%

=== Territories and federal district ===
Territory	Incumbent	Party	First elected	Result	Candidates
District of Columbia	Anthony A. Williams	Democratic	1998	Incumbent retired. New mayor elected. Democratic hold.	▌ ✓ Adrian Fenty (Democratic) 89.7%; ▌David Kranich (Republican) 6.1%; ▌Chris Otten (Statehood Green) 4.1%
Guam	Felix Perez Camacho	Republican	2002	Incumbent re-elected.	▌ ✓ Felix Perez Camacho (Republican) 50.2%; ▌Robert Underwood (Democratic) 48.0%
U.S. Virgin Islands	Charles Wesley Turnbull	Democratic	1998	Incumbent term-limited. New governor elected. Democratic hold.	▌ ✓ John de Jongh (Democratic) 57.3%; ▌Kenneth Mapp (Independent) 42.7%

== Closest races ==
States where the margin of victory was under 5%:

1. Minnesota, 1.0%
2. Rhode Island, 2.0%
3. Guam, 2.3%
4. Nevada, 4.0%

States where the margin of victory was under 10%:

1. Maryland, 6.5%
2. Florida, 7.1%
3. Alaska, 7.4%
4. Wisconsin, 7.5%
5. Maine, 7.7%
6. Oregon, 8.1%
7. Idaho, 8.6%
8. Texas, 9.2%
9. Iowa, 9.4%

Red denotes states won by Republicans. Blue denotes states won by Democrats.

== Alabama ==
Alabama gubernatorial election
- November 7, 2006
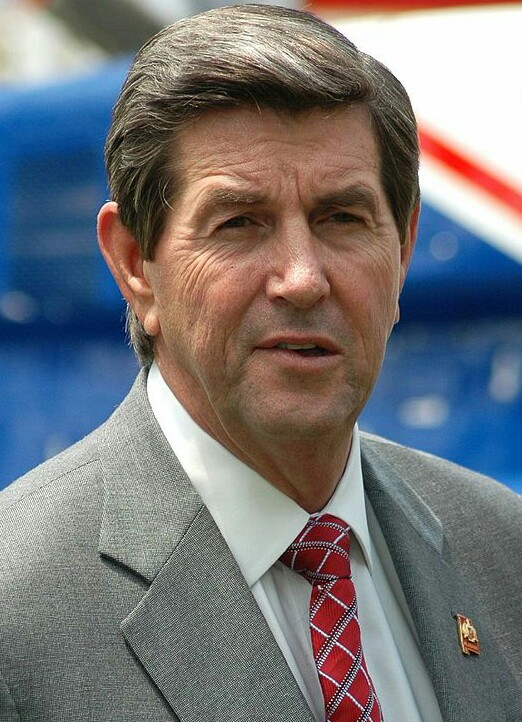

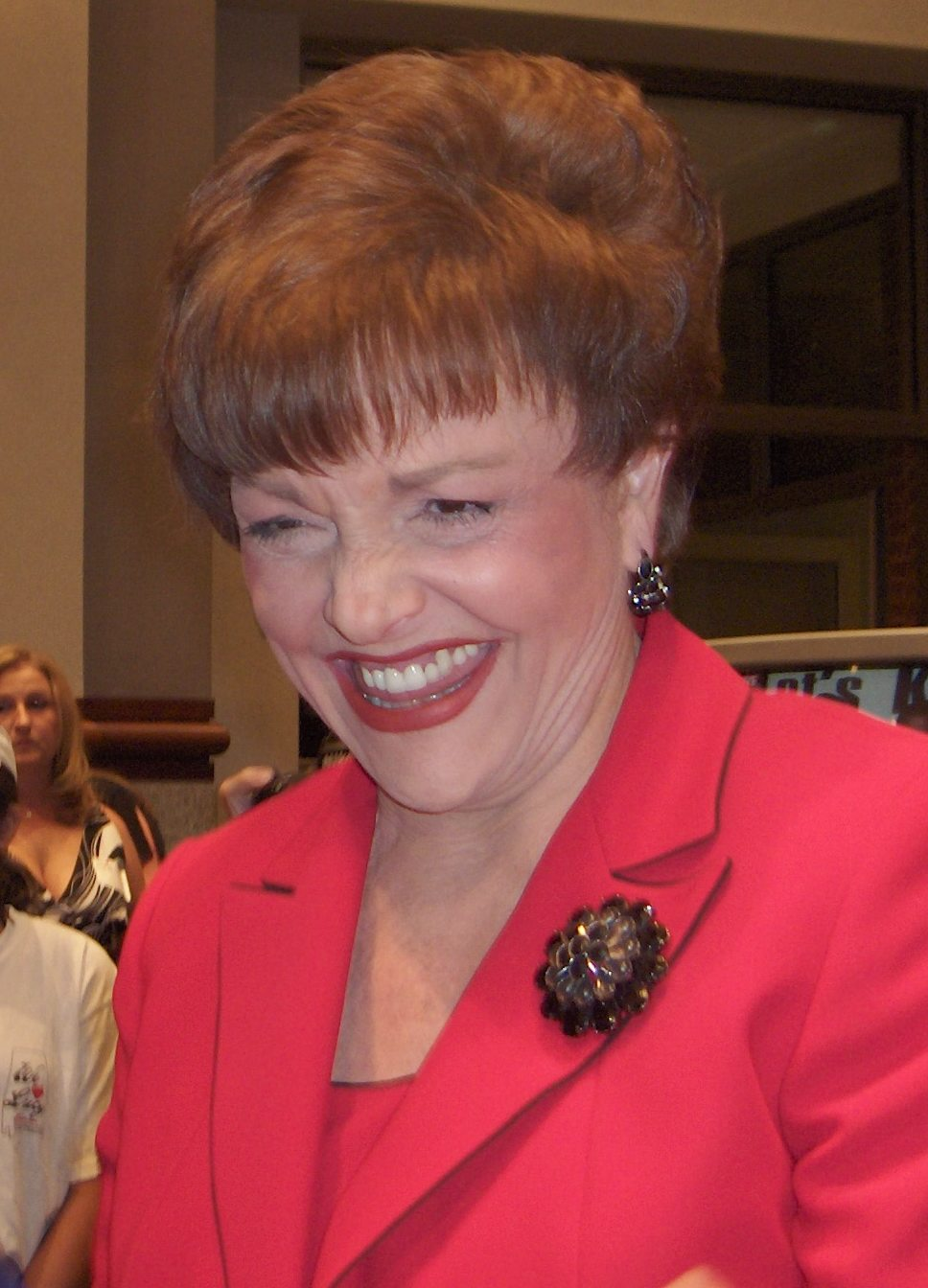
Nominee	Bob Riley	Lucy Baxley
Party	Republican	Democratic
Popular vote	718,327	519,827
Percentage	57.5%	41.6%
- County results Riley: 40–50% 50–60% 60–70% 70–80% Baxley: 40–50% 50–60% 60–70% 70–80%
Governor before election
Bob Riley
Republican
Elected Governor
Bob Riley
Republican

Incumbent Republican Bob Riley defeated Democratic Lieutenant Governor Lucy Baxley. Riley garnered 21% of African Americans' votes.

Alabama election
Party	Candidate	Votes	%
Republican	Bob Riley (incumbent)	718,327	57.45
Democratic	Lucy Baxley	519,827	41.57
Write-in		12,247	0.98
Total votes		1,250,401	100.00
Republican hold			

== Alaska ==
Alaska gubernatorial election
- November 7, 2006
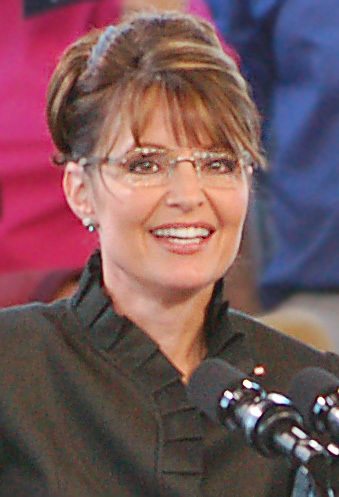

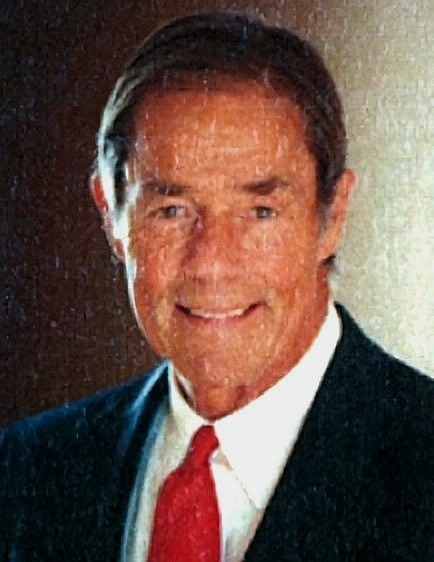

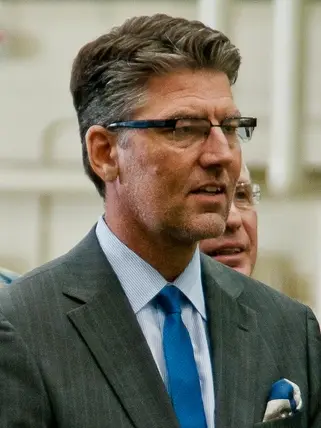
Nominee	Sarah Palin	Tony Knowles	Andrew Halcro
Party	Republican	Democratic	Independent
Running mate	Sean Parnell	Ethan Berkowitz	Fay Von Gemmingen
Popular vote	114,697	97,238	22,443
Percentage	48.3%	41.0%	9.5%
- Borough and census area results Palin: 40–50% 50–60% 60–70% Knowles: 40–50% 50–60% 60–70% 70–80% 80–90%
Governor before election
Frank Murkowski
Republican
Elected Governor
Sarah Palin
Republican

Governor Frank Murkowski, suffering poor approval ratings, was not favored to win renomination. An August 8 poll by Rasmussen Reports showed that going into the primary election his approval rating was at 27%, while his disapproval rating stood at 72%. Former Wasilla Mayor Sarah Palin and former state Railroad Commissioner John Binkley challenged Murkowski in the Republican primary. Former governor Tony Knowles was widely considered the favorite to win the Democratic nomination. In the primary held on August 22, Palin won the Republican nomination for governor with 51.1% of the vote, Binkley received 29.6%, and Murkowski received just 18.9% of the vote. Knowles won the Democratic nomination with 68.6% of the vote; state representative Eric Croft, who received 23.1% of the vote, was his nearest competitor.

Palin campaigned on a clean government platform in a state with a history of corruption. An October 15 CRG Research poll had the candidates tied at 43%. An October 28 Rasmussen Reports poll showed Palin leading Knowles by a single percentage point.

Republican nominee Sarah Palin was elected with 48.3% of the vote, a plurality.

Alaska election
Party	Candidate	Votes	%
Republican	Sarah Palin	114,697	48.33
Democratic	Tony Knowles	97,238	40.97
Independent	Andrew Halcro	22,443	9.46
Independence	Don Wright	1,285	0.54
Libertarian	Billy Toien	682	0.29
Green	David Massie	593	0.25
Write-in		384	0.16
Total votes		238,307	100.00
Republican hold			

== Arizona ==
Arizona gubernatorial election
- November 7, 2006
- Turnout: 60.47% ▲4.14pp
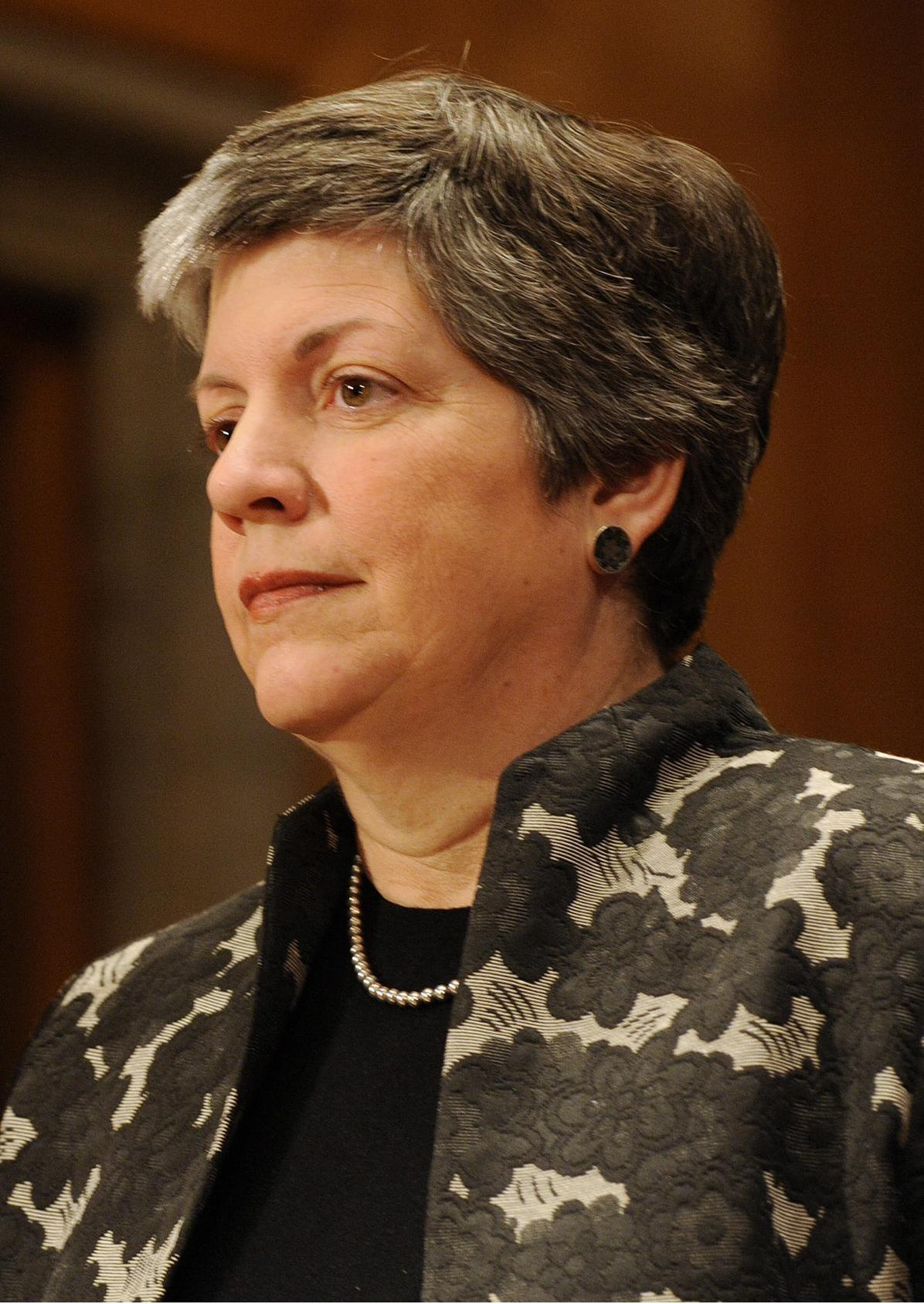

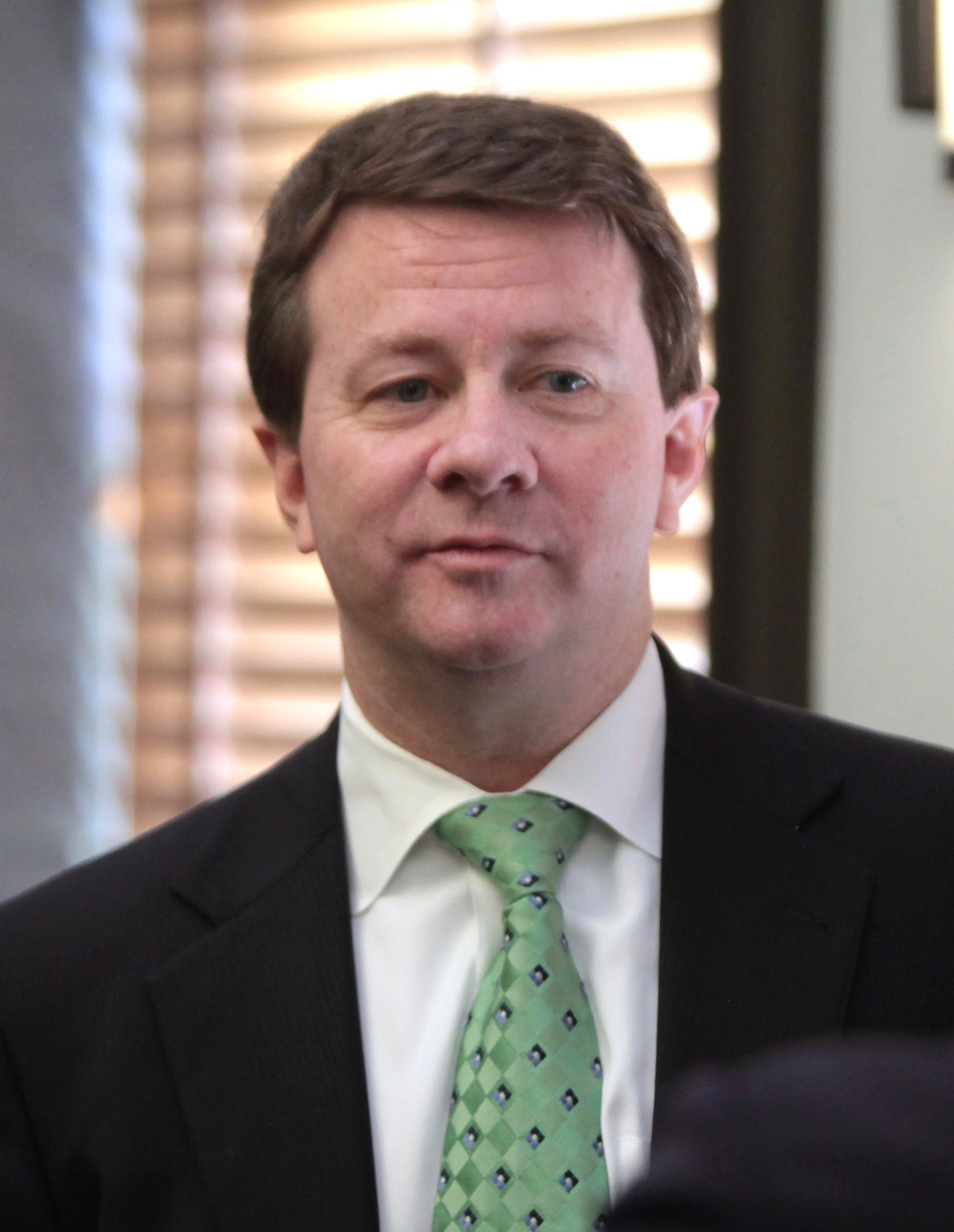
Nominee	Janet Napolitano	Len Munsil
Party	Democratic	Republican
Popular vote	959,830	543,528
Percentage	62.6%	35.4%
- County results Napolitano: 50–60% 60–70% 70–80%
Governor before election
Janet Napolitano
Democratic
Elected Governor
Janet Napolitano
Democratic

Incumbent Democratic governor Janet Napolitano was re-elected in a landslide. Napolitano's widespread popularity contributed to her easy re-election; her general approval rating in October 2006, one month before the election, was at 58%.

Arizona election
Party	Candidate	Votes	%
Democratic	Janet Napolitano (incumbent)	959,830	62.58
Republican	Len Munsil	543,528	35.44
Libertarian	Barry Hess	30,268	1.97
Write-in		19	0.00
Total votes		1,533,645	100.00
Democratic hold			

== Arkansas ==
Arkansas gubernatorial election
- November 7, 2006
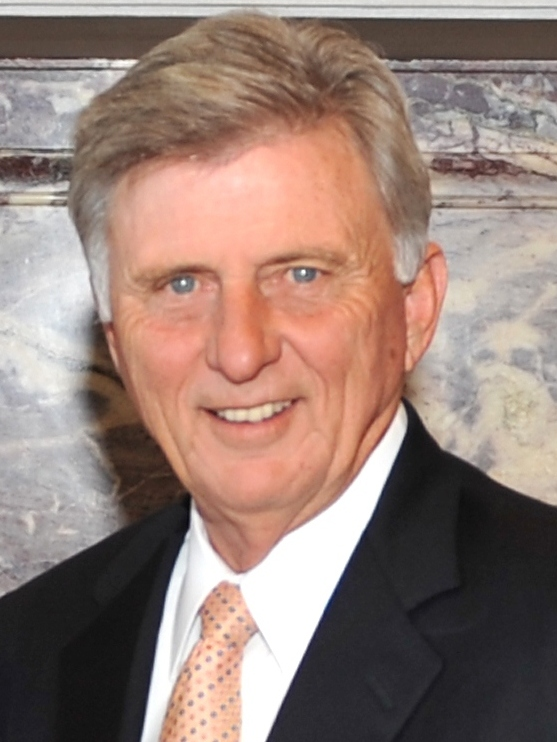

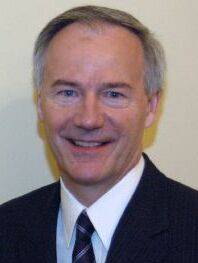
Nominee	Mike Beebe	Asa Hutchinson
Party	Democratic	Republican
Popular vote	430,765	315,040
Percentage	55.6%	40.7%
- County results Beebe: 40–50% 50–60% 60–70% 70–80% Hutchinson: 40–50% 50–60%
Governor before election
Mike Huckabee
Republican
Elected Governor
Mike Beebe
Democratic

Governor Mike Huckabee was term-limited. The Republican Party nominated Asa Hutchinson, a former congressman, U.S. Attorney, DEA head, and Undersecretary of Homeland Security. The Democratic nominee was Arkansas Attorney General Mike Beebe. Beebe's campaign centered on what his campaign called his "Believe in Arkansas Plan", which outlined his plans for improving access to affordable healthcare, improving education, and stimulating economic development and job growth. Beebe led in most statewide polls, although his margin of victory in those polls varied wildly. Just days before the election, a Rasmussen Reports poll showed Beebe winning by just 8%, while a SurveyUSA poll showed him winning by 20%.

Democratic nominee Mike Beebe was elected with about 55.6% of the vote.

Arkansas election
Party	Candidate	Votes	%
Democratic	Mike Beebe	430,765	55.61
Republican	Asa Hutchinson	315,040	40.67
Independent	Rod Bryan	15,767	2.04
Green	Jim Lendall	12,774	1.65
Write-in		334	0.04
Total votes		774,680	100.00
Democratic gain from Republican			

== California ==
California gubernatorial election
- November 7, 2006
- Turnout: 32.77% ▼28.43pp
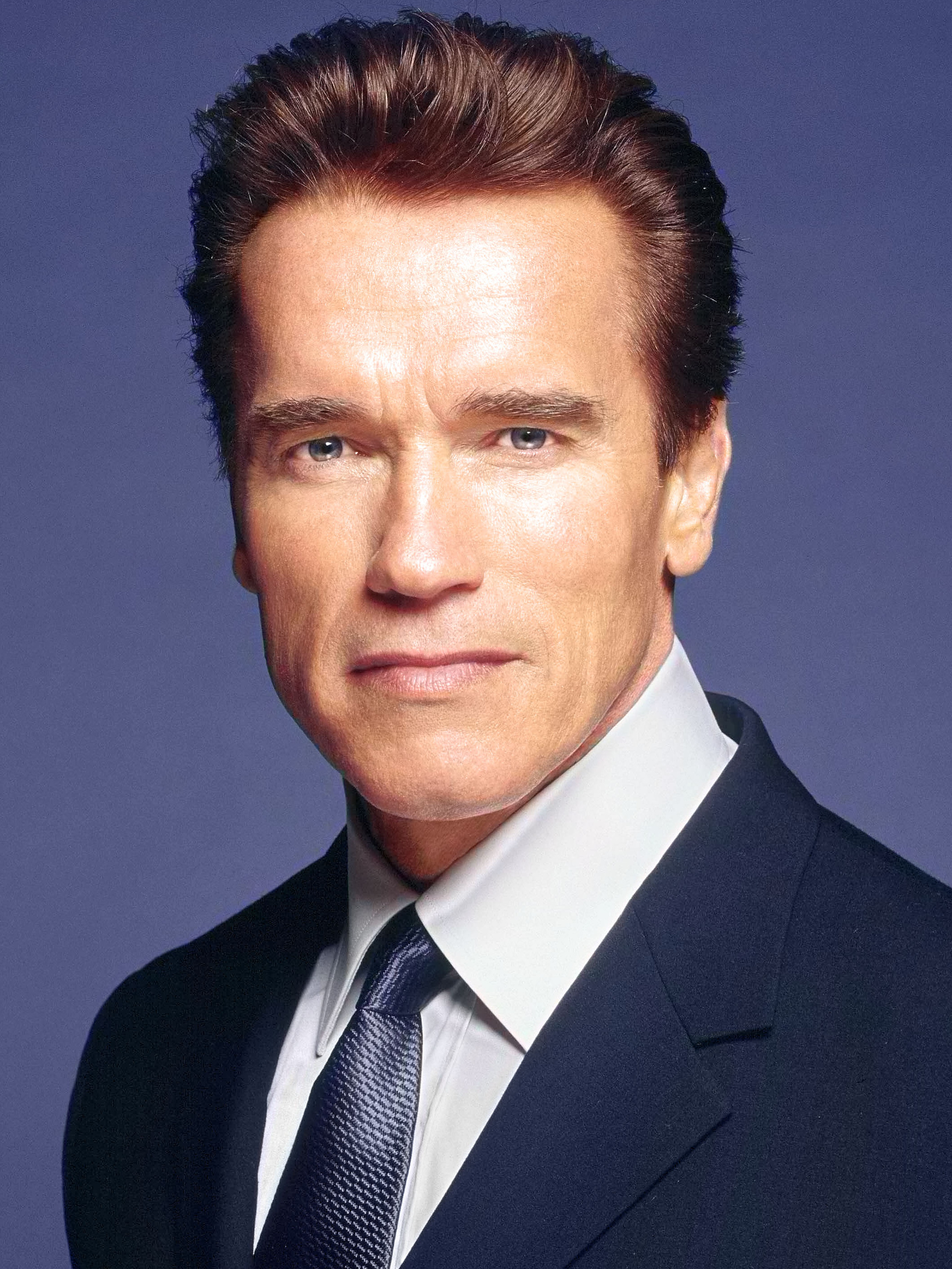

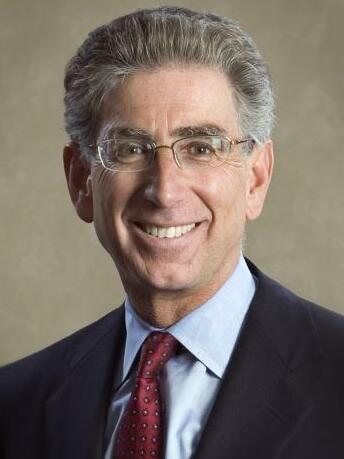
Nominee	Arnold Schwarzenegger	Phil Angelides
Party	Republican	Democratic
Popular vote	4,850,157	3,376,732
Percentage	55.9%	38.9%
- County results Schwarzenegger: 40–50% 50–60% 60–70% 70–80% Angelides: 40–50% 50–60% 60–70%
Governor before election
Arnold Schwarzenegger
Republican
Elected Governor
Arnold Schwarzenegger
Republican

Arnold Schwarzenegger won the 2003 recall election and replaced Gray Davis. Despite his failed special election and budget cuts, Arnold Schwarzenegger seemed to be ahead in the polls against Phil Angelides. Schwarzenegger's aggressive push for environment-friendly legislation, his support for stem cell research, gay rights and opposition to sending the National Guard to the border has made him very popular among the voters. Republican incumbent Arnold Schwarzenegger was re-elected.

California election
Party	Candidate	Votes	%
Republican	Arnold Schwarzenegger (incumbent)	4,850,157	55.88
Democratic	Phil Angelides	3,376,732	38.91
Green	Peter Camejo	205,995	2.37
Libertarian	Art Olivier	114,329	1.32
Peace and Freedom	Janice Jordan	69,934	0.81
American Independent	Edward C. Noonan	61,901	0.71
Write-in		375	0.00
Total votes		8,679,423	100.00
Republican hold			

== Colorado ==
Colorado gubernatorial election
- November 7, 2006
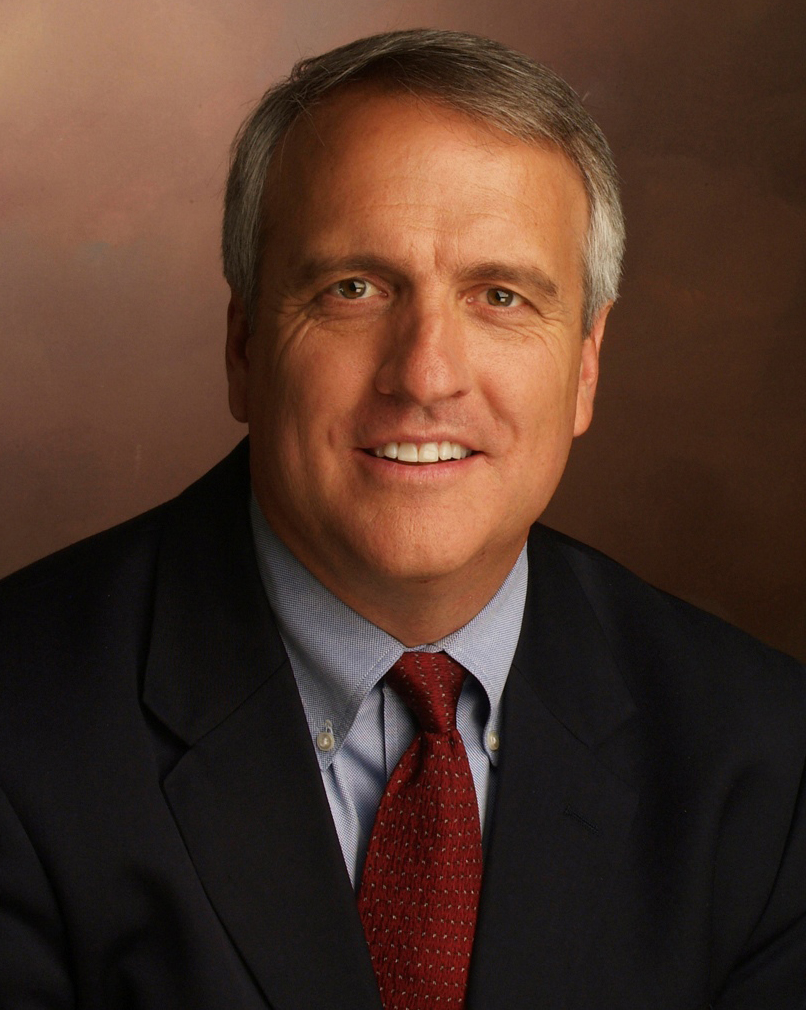

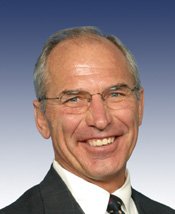
Nominee	Bill Ritter	Bob Beauprez
Party	Democratic	Republican
Popular vote	887,986	625,886
Percentage	57.0%	40.2%
- County results Ritter: 40–50% 50–60% 60–70% 70–80% Beauprez: 40–50% 50–60% 60–70%
Governor before election
Bill Owens
Republican
Elected Governor
Bill Ritter
Democratic

The retirement of term-limited Governor Bill Owens revealed divisions among the state's Republicans. Republican congressman Bob Beauprez, widely regarded as a conservative, was attacked by his primary opponent, former University of Denver President Marc Holtzman for compromising with Democrats in Congress. Beauprez became the nominee when Holtzman failed to submit enough valid signatures to qualify for the ballot, but the negative attacks they exchanged damaged Beauprez's campaign. The Democratic nominee was former Denver District Attorney Bill Ritter, an anti-abortion Catholic and a political centrist who could not easily be portrayed as a liberal. Ritter did, however, support Referendum I and oppose Amendment 43; conversely, the public defeated the former and passed the latter. Ritter's campaign was boosted when he was endorsed by a group of Larimer County Republicans. During the period of January through August, Ritter raised almost twice as much as Beauprez. According to an October 16 Zogby poll, Ritter led Beauprez 47% to 45%. An October 22 SurveyUSA poll showed Ritter leading Beauprez by a larger margin, 56% to 38%. Similarly, an October 22 Rasmussen Reports poll showed Ritter leading Beauprez, 51% to 39%.

Democratic nominee Bill Ritter was elected with 57.0% of the vote.

Colorado election
Party	Candidate	Votes	%
Democratic	Bill Ritter	888,095	56.99
Republican	Bob Beauprez	625,886	40.16
Libertarian	Dawn Winkler	23,323	1.50
Independent	Paul Fiorino	10,996	0.71
Constitution	Clyde Harkins	9,716	0.62
Write-in		389	0.02
Total votes		1,558,405	100.00
Democratic gain from Republican			

== Connecticut ==
Connecticut gubernatorial election
- November 7, 2006
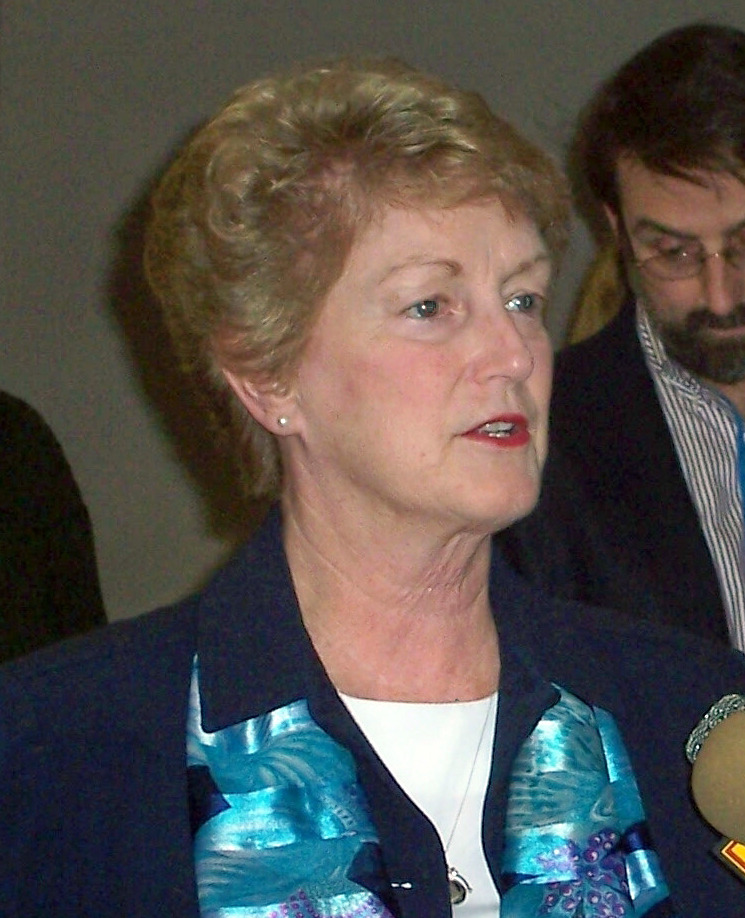

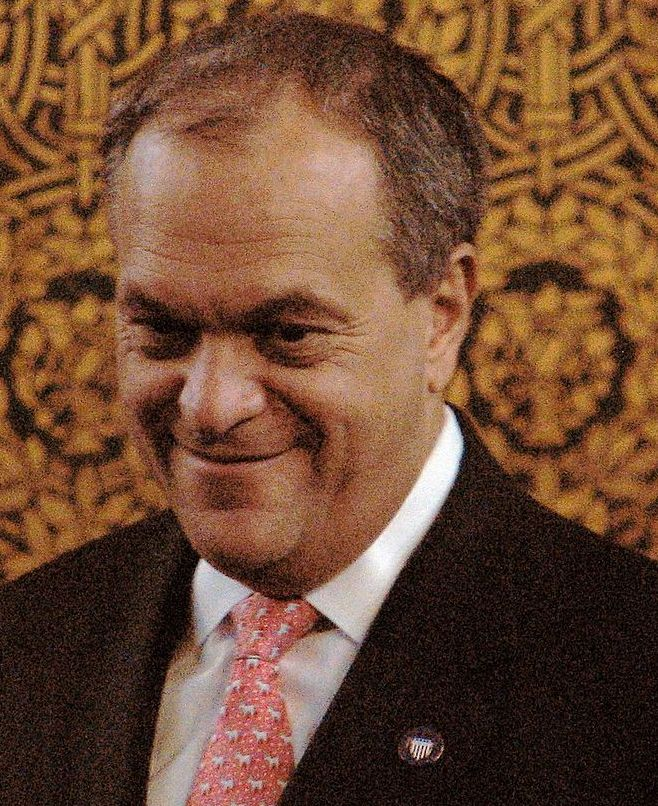
Nominee	Jodi Rell	John DeStefano Jr.
Party	Republican	Democratic
Running mate	Michael Fedele	Mary Glassman
Popular vote	710,048	398,220
Percentage	63.2%	35.5%
- Rell: 50–60% 60–70% 70–80% 80–90% DeStefano: 50–60% 60–70%
Governor before election
Jodi Rell
Republican
Elected Governor
Jodi Rell
Republican

Incumbent Republican Jodi Rell became governor when John G. Rowland resigned on corruption charges in 2004. Rell had an approval rating of 70% as of October 19, 2006, and polls showed her leading the Democratic nominee, New Haven mayor John DeStefano by a near 30-point margin. As expected, she won the election to a full term in a landslide. DeStefano defeated Stamford Mayor Dannel Malloy in the Connecticut Democratic gubernatorial primary on August 8.

Connecticut election
Party	Candidate	Votes	%
Republican	Jodi Rell (incumbent)	710,048	63.22
Democratic	John DeStefano Jr.	398,220	35.45
Green	Cliff Thornton	9,584	0.85
Concerned Citizens	Joseph A. Zdonczyk	5,560	0.49
Write-in		54	0.00
Total votes		1,123,212	100.00
Republican hold			

== Florida ==
Florida gubernatorial election
- November 7, 2006
- Turnout: 46.8%▼8.5
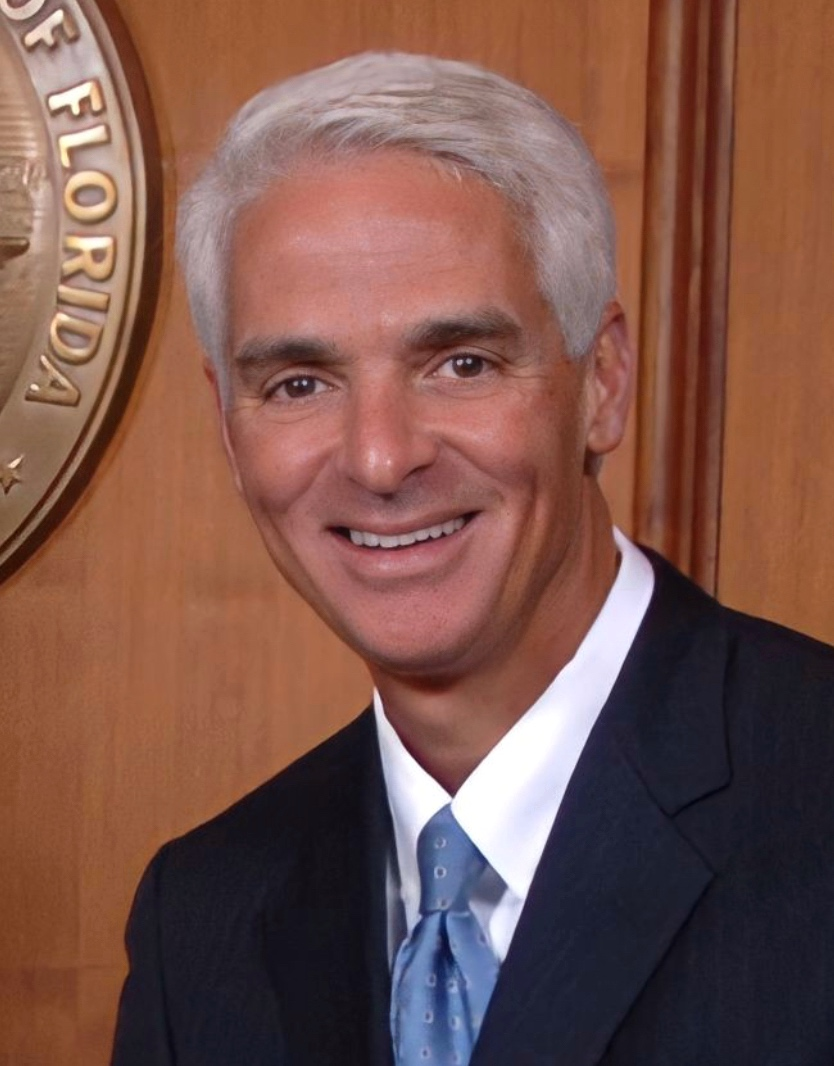

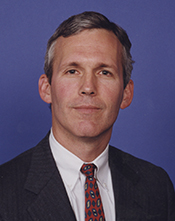
Nominee	Charlie Crist	Jim Davis
Party	Republican	Democratic
Running mate	Jeff Kottkamp	Daryl Jones
Popular vote	2,519,845	2,178,289
Percentage	52.2%	45.1%
- County results Crist: 40–50% 50–60% 60–70% 70–80% Davis: 40–50% 50–60% 60–70%
Governor before election
Jeb Bush
Republican
Elected Governor
Charlie Crist
Republican

Governor Jeb Bush was term-limited. Florida Attorney General Charlie Crist, a moderate, won the Republican primary with 64%, defeating the Chief Financial Officer of Florida, Tom Gallagher, who received only 34%. Congressman Jim Davis of Tampa won the Democratic primary with 47% of the vote, defeating State Senator Rod Smith of Alachua, who received 41% of the vote. In addition to Crist and Davis, Reform Party nominee Max Linn also appeared on the ballot in the general election.

Crist came out of the September 12 primary with momentum, but as the election drew closer, polls began to show a more competitive race. An October 23 Quinnipiac poll October 23 showed Crist's lead down to 2%. However, an October 26 Rasmussen Reports poll had Crist leading Davis 52% to 41%.

Republican nominee Charlie Crist was elected with 52.2% of the vote.

Florida election
Party	Candidate	Votes	%
Republican	Charlie Crist	2,519,845	52.20
Democratic	Jim Davis	2,178,289	45.10
Reform	Max Linn	92,595	1.90
Independent	John Wayne Smith	15,987	0.30
Independent	Richard Paul Dembinsky	11,921	0.20
Independent	Karl C.C. Behm	10,487	0.20
Write-in		147	0.00
Total votes		4,829,271	100.00
Republican hold			

== Georgia ==
Georgia gubernatorial election
- November 7, 2006
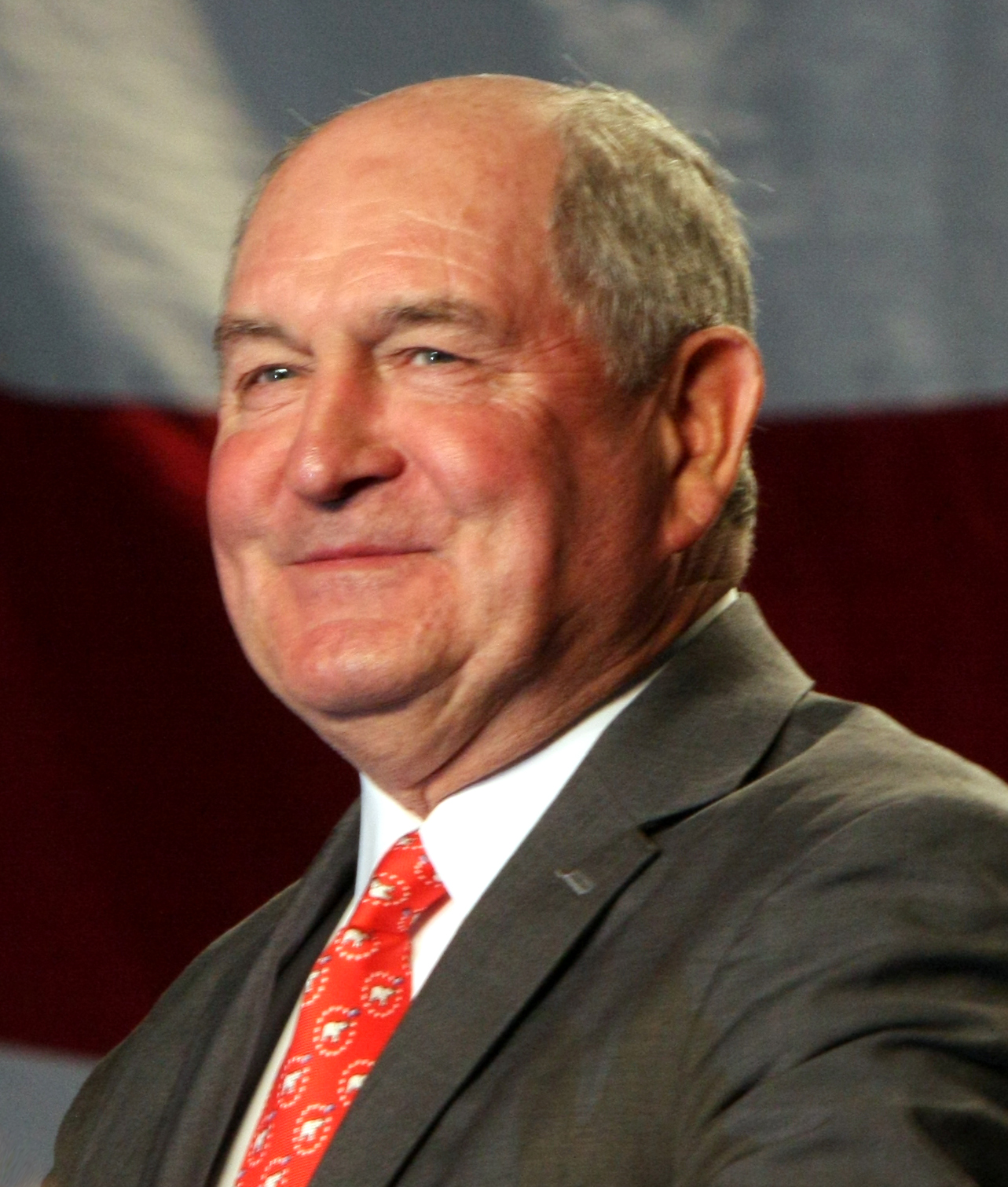

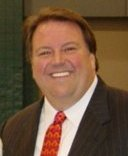
Nominee	Sonny Perdue	Mark Taylor
Party	Republican	Democratic
Popular vote	1,229,724	811,049
Percentage	58.0%	38.2%
- County results Perdue: 40–50% 50–60% 60–70% 70–80% 80–90% Taylor: 40–50% 50–60% 60–70% 70–80%
Governor before election
Sonny Perdue
Republican
Elected Governor
Sonny Perdue
Republican

Incumbent Republican governor Sonny Perdue ran for re-election to a second and final term as governor. Governor Perdue was renominated by the Republican Party, defeating a minor opponent in the process, while Lieutenant Governor Mark Taylor narrowly emerged victorious from a competitive Democratic primary. In the general election, though Taylor ran a spirited campaign, Perdue was aided by the increasing tendency of the state to vote for Republicans and by his popularity with the public; polling showed his approval ratings above sixty percent. In the end, Perdue was overwhelmingly re-elected as governor, defeating Taylor in a landslide, becoming the first Republican governor of Georgia to ever be reelected. Exit polls showed that Perdue won white voters (68% to 27%) while Taylor won black voters (81% to 17%). Perdue's 17% of the African-American vote was the highest showing of any Republican seeking statewide office in Georgia.

Georgia election
Party	Candidate	Votes	%
Republican	Sonny Perdue (incumbent)	1,229,724	57.95
Democratic	Mark Taylor	811,049	38.22
Libertarian	Gary Hayes	81,412	3.84
Total votes		2,122,185	100.00
Republican hold			

== Hawaii ==
2006 Hawaii gubernatorial election
- November 7, 2006
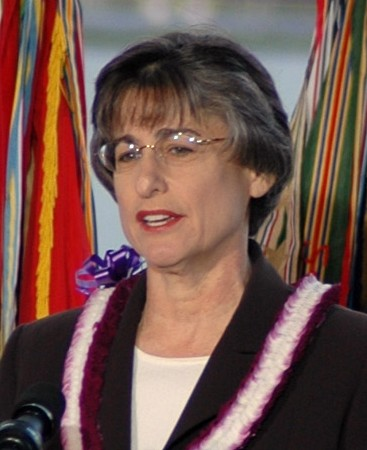

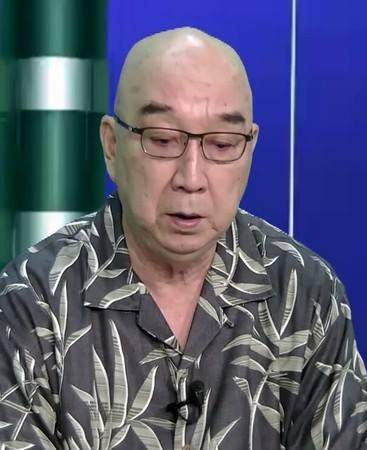
Nominee	Linda Lingle	Randy Iwase
Party	Republican	Democratic
Running mate	Duke Aiona	Malama Solomon
Popular vote	215,313	121,717
Percentage	62.5%	35.4%
- County results Lingle: 50–60% 60–70%
Governor before election
Linda Lingle
Republican
Elected Governor
Linda Lingle
Republican

Although 2006 was a strong election year for Democrats, Incumbent Republican governor Lingle won re-election by a landslide owing to an economic rebound in the state that occurred during her tenure after a shaky decade for the state economy during the 1990s and early 2000s.

Hawaii election
Party	Candidate	Votes	%
Republican	Linda Lingle (incumbent)	215,313	62.53
Democratic	Randy Iwase	121,717	35.35
Green	James Brewer Jr.	5,435	1.58
Libertarian	Ozell Daniel	1,850	0.54
Total votes		344,315	100.00
Republican hold			

== Idaho ==
Idaho gubernatorial election
- November 7, 2006
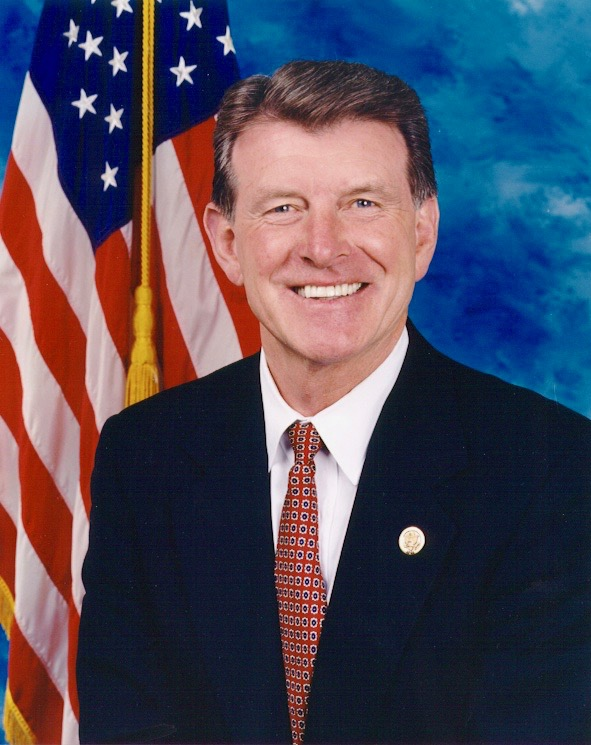

Nominee	Butch Otter	Jerry Brady
Party	Republican	Democratic
Popular vote	237,437	198,845
Percentage	52.7%	44.1%
- County results Otter: 50–60% 60–70% 70–80% Brady: 40–50% 50–60% 60–70%
Governor before election
Jim Risch
Republican
Elected Governor
Butch Otter
Republican

Governor Jim Risch was elected lieutenant governor in 2002; in May 2006, he succeeded to the governorship when his predecessor, Dirk Kempthorne, resigned to become United States Secretary of the Interior. Before Kempthorne's appointment, Risch, a former Ada County District Attorney and state Senator, had committed to a reelection campaign for lieutenant governor, which meant the campaign for the governorship remained open.

Republican congressman C.L. "Butch" Otter, a former lieutenant governor himself, was heavily favored to succeed Risch. On May 23 he easily won a four-way Republican primary, receiving 70% of the vote. In the general election, he faced newspaper publisher Jerry Brady, who was the Democratic nominee for the second consecutive gubernatorial election. Although Brady won the state's most populous county (Ada County, the location of Boise) in 2002, he was decisively defeated by Kempthorne statewide. He was expected to fare similarly against Otter; however, the race became fairly competitive, possibly due to a national trend towards the Democratic party.

Republican nominee Butch Otter was elected with 52.7% of the vote. Brady received 44.1%, making this gubernatorial election the closest in Idaho since 1994.

Idaho election
Party	Candidate	Votes	%
Republican	Butch Otter	237,437	52.67
Democratic	Jerry Brady	198,845	44.11
Constitution	Marvin Richardson	7,309	1.62
Libertarian	Ted Dunlap	7,241	1.61
Total votes		450,832	100.00
Republican hold			

== Illinois ==
Illinois gubernatorial election
- November 7, 2006
- Turnout: 47.29% ▼2.76 pp
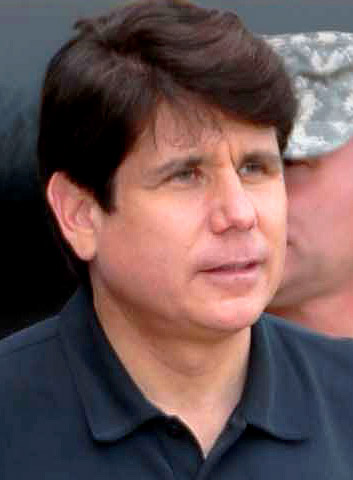

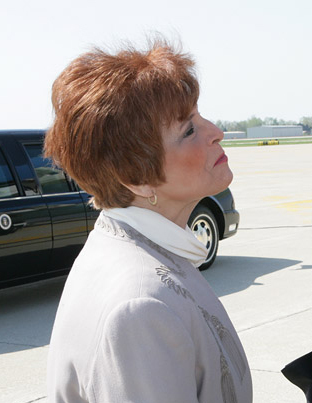

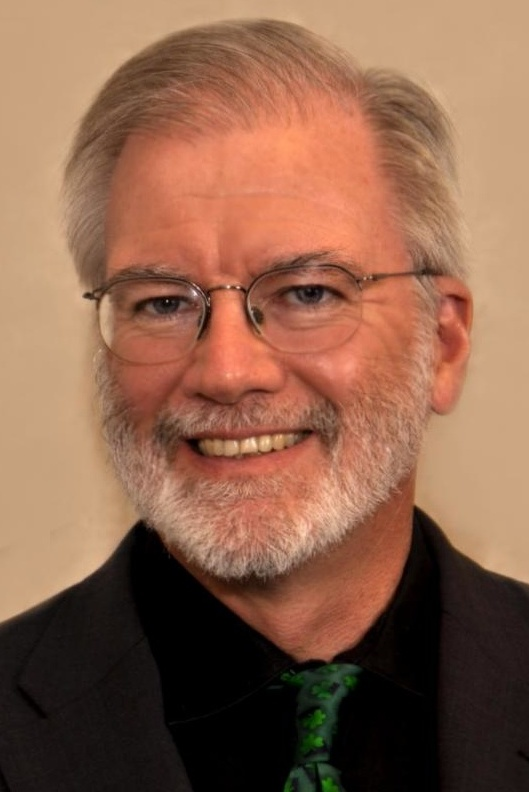
Nominee	Rod Blagojevich	Judy Baar Topinka	Rich Whitney
Party	Democratic	Republican	Green
Running mate	Pat Quinn	Joe Birkett	Julie Samuels
Popular vote	1,736,731	1,369,315	361,336
Percentage	49.8%	39.3%	10.4%
- County results Blagojevich: 30–40% 40–50% 50–60% 60–70% Topinka: 30–40% 40–50% 50–60% 60–70% 70–80%
Governor before election
Rod Blagojevich
Democratic
Elected Governor
Rod Blagojevich
Democratic

Incumbent Rod Blagojevich had proven to be an incredible fundraiser, and governed a relatively strong blue state. But recent opinion polling showed that his approval rating at a rather dismal 44%. Blagojevich initially had the advantage in the general election, leading his Republican challenger, state Treasurer Judy Baar Topinka by eight percentage points in polls, although not reaching the fifty percent "safe zone" for incumbents. In March, Topinka won the GOP primary by 38% to 32% over dairy magnate Jim Oberweis. Meanwhile, a former Chicago Alderman named Edwin Eisendrath won a surprising 30% in the Democratic primary. During the election United States Attorney Patrick Fitzgerald was looking into the hiring practices of Governor Blagojevich.

An October 15 Rasmussen Reports poll showed Blagojevich dropping 4 points, to end with 44% and Topinka staying at 36%. An October 22 SurveyUSA poll had Blagojevich leading Topinka 44% to 34% with 8% undecided. However, an October 31 Mason-Dixon poll showed Blagojevich leading Topinka only 44% to 40% with 9% undecided.

Democratic incumbent Rod Blagojevich was re-elected. Green Party candidate Rich Whitney showed one of the best showings of a third-party candidate in the 2006 election. Whitney received 361,336 votes, or 10% of the ballot share. This made the Green party an official major party in the state of Illinois.

Illinois election
Party	Candidate	Votes	%
Democratic	Rod Blagojevich (incumbent)	1,736,731	49.79
Republican	Judy Baar Topinka	1,369,315	39.26
Green	Rich Whitney	361,336	10.36
Write-in		20,607	0.59
Total votes		3,487,989	100.00
Democratic hold			

== Iowa ==
Iowa gubernatorial election
- November 7, 2006
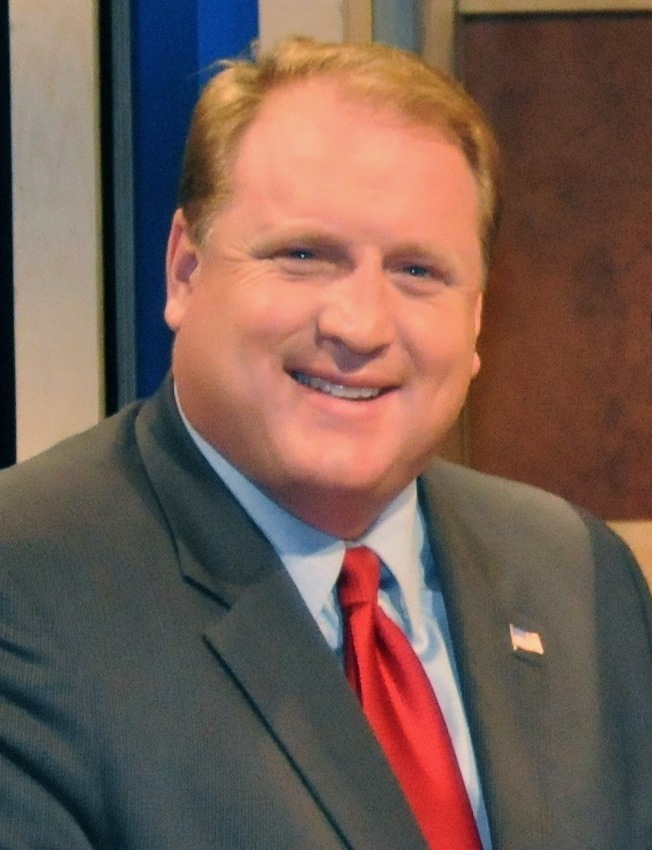

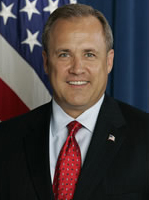
Nominee	Chet Culver	Jim Nussle
Party	Democratic	Republican
Running mate	Patty Judge	Bob Vander Plaats
Popular vote	569,021	467,425
Percentage	54.0%	44.4%
- County results Culver: 40–50% 50–60% 60–70% Nussle: 40–50% 50–60% 60–70% 70–80% 80–90%
Governor before election
Tom Vilsack
Democratic
Elected Governor
Chet Culver
Democratic

Congressman Jim Nussle was the Republican nominee, while the Democratic Party nominated Iowa Secretary of State Chet Culver, a progressive whose father was a U.S. Senator. An October 11 poll by Rasmussen Reports showed the candidates tied at 42% each. An October 19 Rasmussen Reports poll had Culver leading Nussle 47% to 44%.

The Democratic nominee, Chet Culver, was elected with 54.0% of the vote.

Iowa election
Party	Candidate	Votes	%
Democratic	Chet Culver	569,021	54.02
Republican	Jim Nussle	467,425	44.38
Green	Wendy Barth	7,850	0.75
Libertarian	Kevin Litten	5,735	0.54
Socialist Workers	Mary Martin	1,974	0.19
Write-in		1,250	0.12
Total votes		1,053,255	100.00
Democratic hold			

== Kansas ==
Kansas gubernatorial election
- November 7, 2006
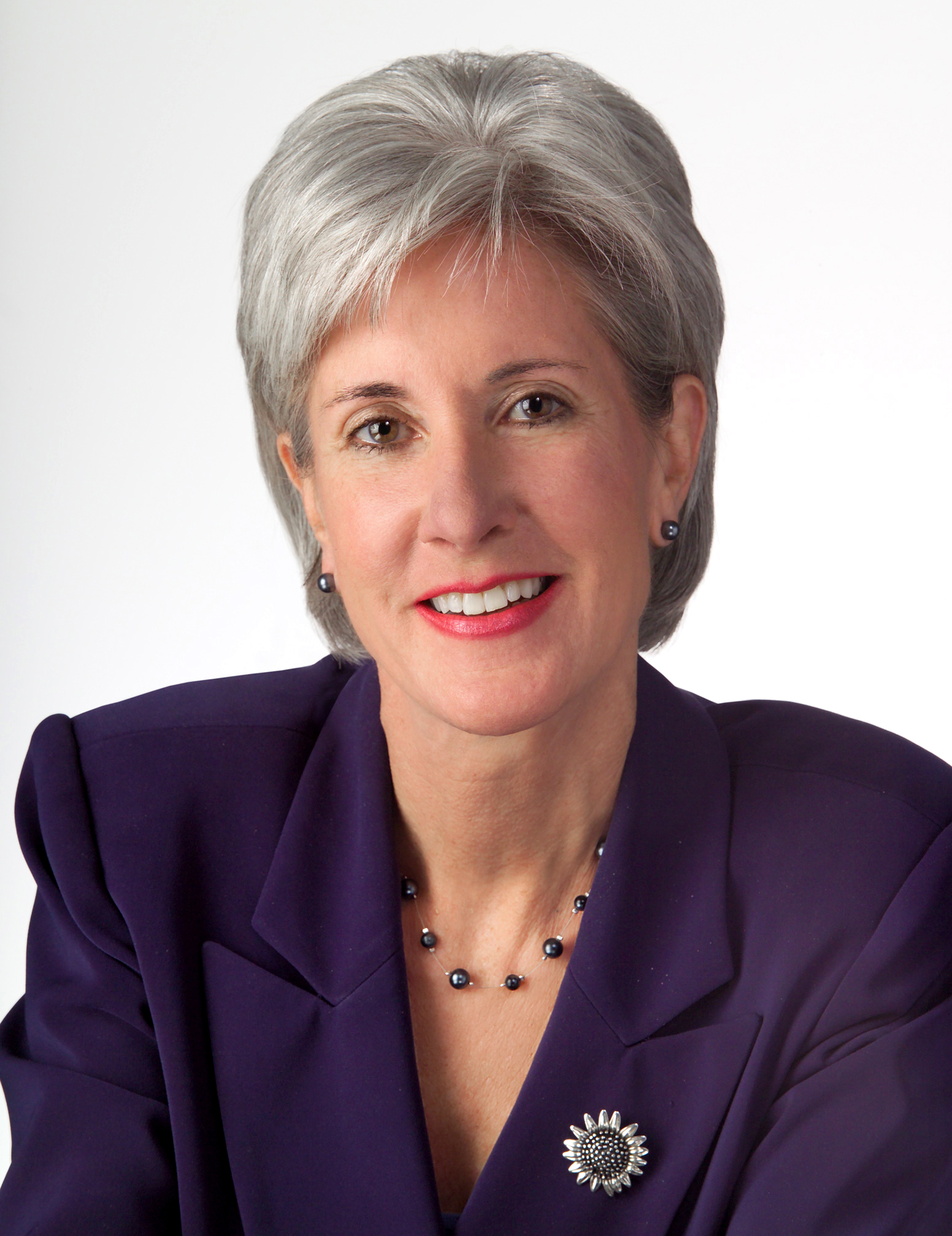

Nominee	Kathleen Sebelius	Jim Barnett
Party	Democratic	Republican
Running mate	Mark Parkinson	Susan Wagle
Popular vote	491,993	343,586
Percentage	57.9%	40.4%
- County results Sebelius: 40–50% 50–60% 60–70% 70–80% Barnett: 40–50% 50–60% 60–70%
Governor before election
Kathleen Sebelius
Democratic
Elected Governor
Kathleen Sebelius
Democratic

Incumbent Democratic governor Kathleen Sebelius, who sported high approval ratings ran for re-election to serve a second and final term. Governor Sebelius was unopposed for the Democratic nomination and she faced the Republican nominee, State Senator Jim Barnett, who emerged from a crowded primary. Sebelius soundly defeated Barnett and cruised to re-election, which was quite a considerable feat for a Democrat in staunchly conservative Kansas.

Kansas election
Party	Candidate	Votes	%
Democratic	Kathleen Sebelius (incumbent)	491,993	57.90
Republican	Jim Barnett	343,586	40.44
Libertarian	Carl Kramer	8,896	1.05
Reform	Richard Lee Ranzau	5,221	0.61
Write-in		4	0.00
Total votes		849,700	100.00
Democratic hold			

== Maine ==
Maine gubernatorial election
- November 7, 2006
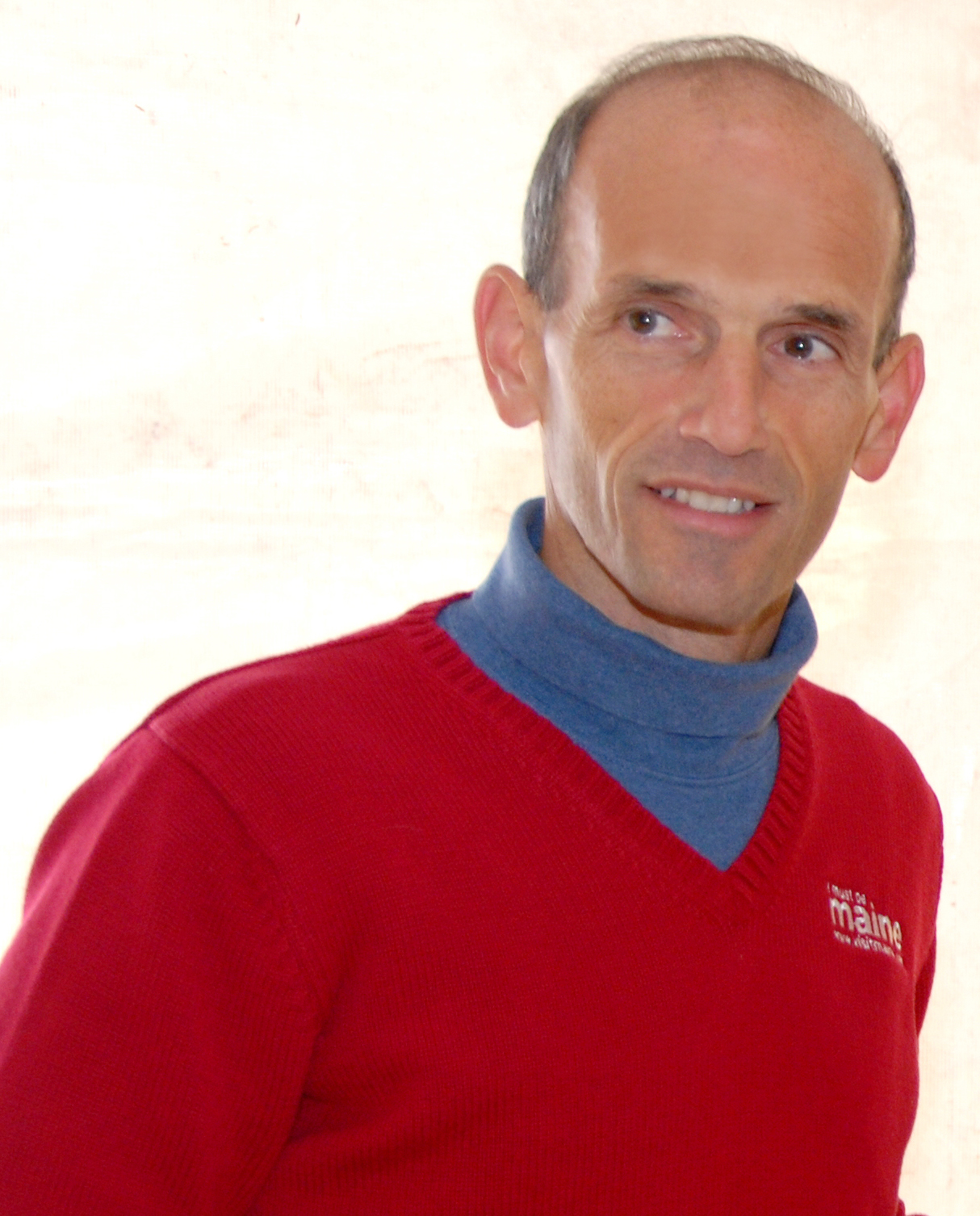

Nominee	John Baldacci	Chandler Woodcock
Party	Democratic	Republican
Popular vote	209,927	166,425
Percentage	38.11%	30.21%
Nominee	Barbara Merrill	Pat LaMarche
Party	Independent	Green
Popular vote	118,715	52,690
Percentage	21.55%	9.56%
- County results Baldacci: 30–40% 40–50% Woodcock: 30–40% 40–50%
Governor before election
John Baldacci
Democratic
Elected Governor
John Baldacci
Democratic

In February 2006, Baldacci was given a mere 41% approval rating by the voters of Maine in one poll. But when the GOP unexpectedly nominated conservative state senator Chandler Woodcock over the more moderate state senator Peter Mills and former congressman Dave Emery, Baldacci was handed a huge boost.

Polls consistently showed Baldacci with a small lead. An October 17 Rasmussen Reports poll had Baldacci with 44% and Woodcock at 34%. Meanwhile, a Voice of the Voter poll announced by WCSH on November 6, one day before the election, gave John Baldacci his smallest lead yet with only 36%, with Senator Chandler Woodcock 30% and the now leading independent Barbara Merrill 22%, more than doubling her share. Green Independent candidate Pat LaMarche polled at 11%.

Baldacci was reelected with 38% of the vote compared to Woodcock's 30%, with 21.55% going to independent Barbara Merrill.

Maine election
Party	Candidate	Votes	%
Democratic	John Baldacci (incumbent)	209,927	38.11
Republican	Chandler Woodcock	166,425	30.21
Independent	Barbara Merrill	118,715	21.55
Green	Pat LaMarche	52,690	9.56
Independent	Phillip Morris Napier	3,108	0.56
Total votes		550,865	100.00
Democratic hold			

== Maryland ==
Maryland gubernatorial election
- November 7, 2006
- Turnout: 57.53% ▼4.32%
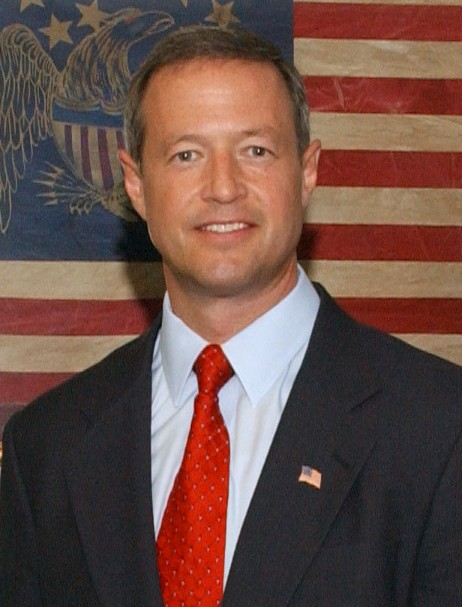

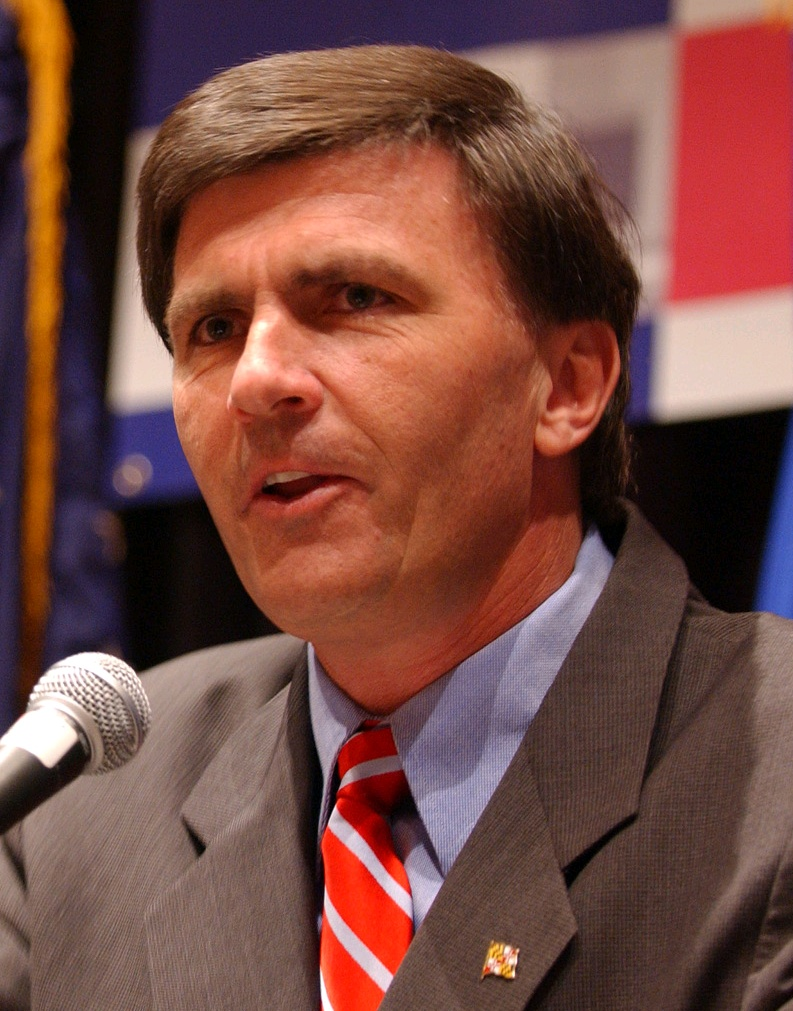
Nominee	Martin O'Malley	Bob Ehrlich
Party	Democratic	Republican
Running mate	Anthony Brown	Kristen Cox
Popular vote	942,279	825,464
Percentage	52.7%	46.2%
- County results O'Malley: 40–50% 50–60% 60–70% 70–80% Ehrlich: 50–60% 60–70%
Governor before election
Bob Ehrlich
Republican
Elected Governor
Martin O'Malley
Democratic

Bob Ehrlich's approval rating was 48%, which suggested a close election. Martin O'Malley, Mayor of Baltimore City, who was expected to run for governor almost as soon as the 2002 election was over, was initially expected to be a shoo-in for the Democratic nomination, but he was challenged by Montgomery County Executive Doug Duncan, who then unexpectedly dropped out of the race, citing a recent diagnosis of clinical depression, saving Democrats from a costly and potentially divisive primary.

A November 2 SurveyUSA poll had O'Malley leading Ehrlich 48% to 47% with 2% undecided. A November 3 Mason-Dixon poll has O'Malley and Ehrlich tied at 45% with 9% undecided. Democratic nominee Martin O'Malley was elected.

When Ehrlich unexpectedly beat his Democratic challenger, Lt. Governor Kathleen Kennedy in 2002, and became first Republican Governor of Maryland since Spiro T. Agnew, he was regarded by many as potential presidential candidate for 2008.

O'Malley defeated Ehrlich in the general election, 52.7% to 46.2%.

Maryland election
Party	Candidate	Votes	%
Democratic	Martin O'Malley	942,279	52.69
Republican	Bob Ehrlich (incumbent)	825,464	46.16
Green	Ed Boyd	15,551	0.87
Populist	Christopher Driscoll	3,481	0.19
Write-in		1,541	0.09
Total votes		1,788,316	100.00
Democratic gain from Republican			

== Massachusetts ==
Massachusetts gubernatorial election
- November 7, 2006
- Turnout: 56.23% ▲0.94
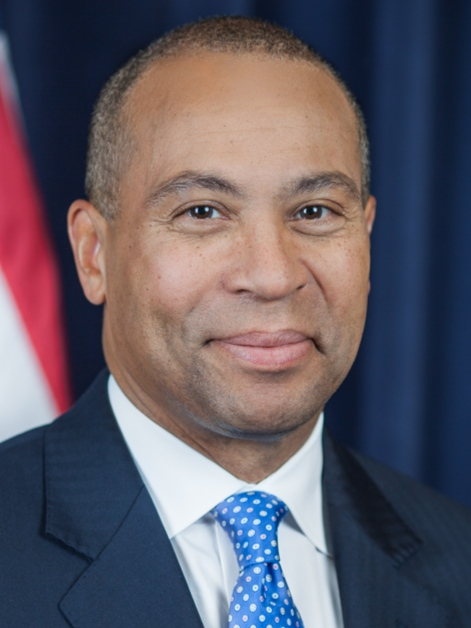

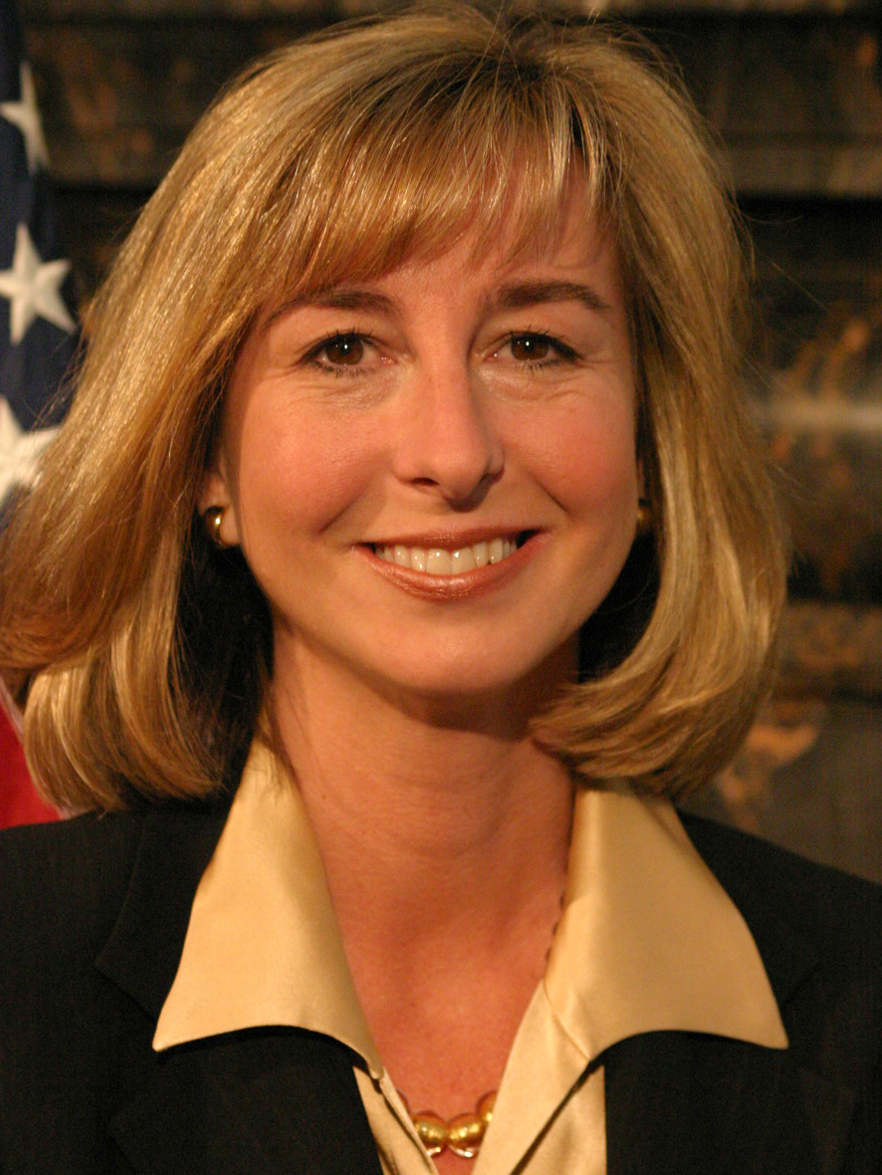

Nominee	Deval Patrick	Kerry Healey	Christy Mihos
Party	Democratic	Republican	Independent
Running mate	Tim Murray	Reed V. Hillman	John J. Sullivan
Popular vote	1,234,984	784,342	154,628
Percentage	55.0%	35.0%	6.9%
- Patrick: 40–50% 50–60% 60–70% 70–80% 80–90% >90% Healey: 40–50% 50–60% Tie: 40–50%
Governor before election
Mitt Romney
Republican
Elected Governor
Deval Patrick
Democratic

With his approval ratings down, Governor Mitt Romney opted not to seek a second term. Romney endorsed his lieutenant governor, Kerry Healey, in her bid to succeed him. Healey was unopposed in the Republican primary. Deval Patrick, a former U.S. Assistant Attorney General who headed the Department of Justice's Civil Rights Division, won the Democratic primary with 50% of the vote against Thomas Reilly and Chris Gabrieli. Third-party candidates included Grace Ross of the Green-Rainbow Party and independent Christy Mihos, a former Republican and board member on the state Turnpike Authority. Over the course of the campaign, Patrick was the victim of several smears by the Healey campaign, including reports of his brother-in-law's criminal history that were leaked to the press.

On November 7, Deval Patrick was elected with 56% of the vote. He became the first African American governor ever elected in the history of the state, and just the second in the nation's history (the first was Douglas Wilder, a Democrat from Virginia, who served as Governor of Virginia from 1990 to 1994). Patrick was also the first Democratic governor of Massachusetts since Michael Dukakis left office in 1991.

Massachusetts election
Party	Candidate	Votes	%
Democratic	Deval Patrick	1,234,984	55.64
Republican	Kerry Healey	784,342	35.33
Independent	Christy Mihos	154,628	6.97
Green-Rainbow	Grace Ross	43,193	1.95
Write-in		2,632	0.12
Total votes		2,219,779	100.00
Democratic gain from Republican			

== Michigan ==
Michigan gubernatorial election
- November 7, 2006
- Turnout: 50.7% ▲7.2
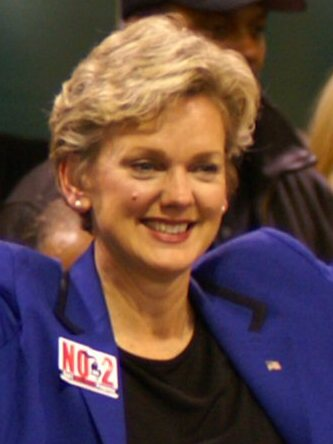

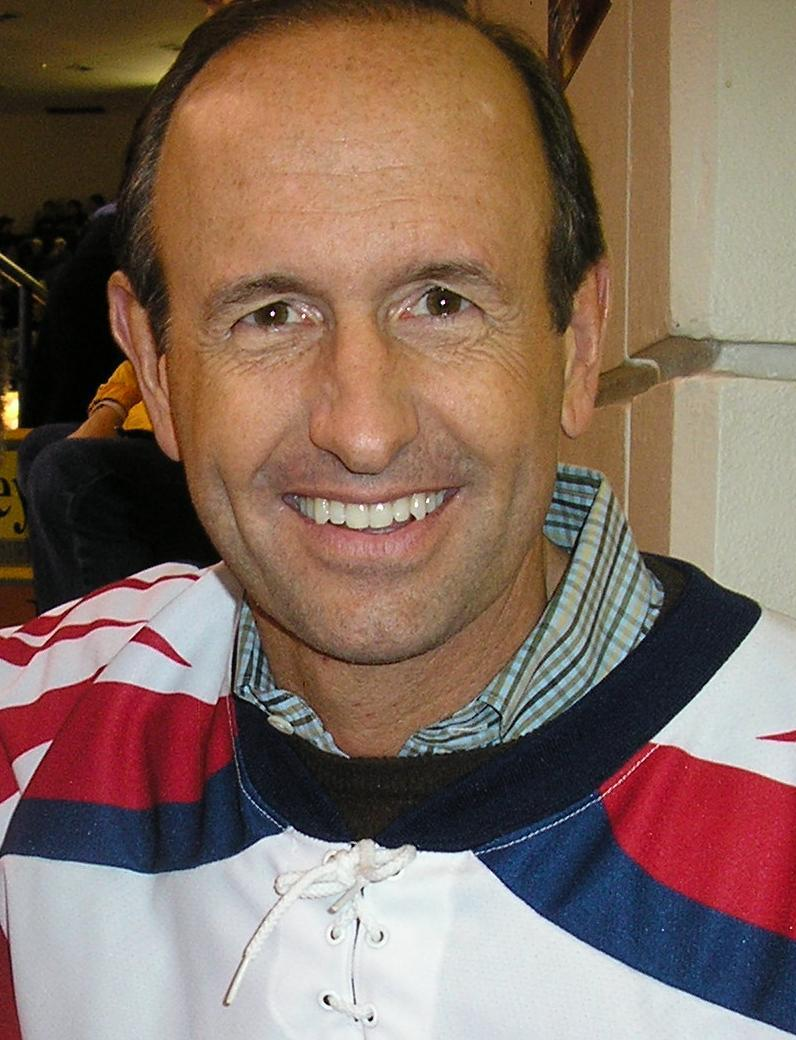
Nominee	Jennifer Granholm	Dick DeVos
Party	Democratic	Republican
Running mate	John Cherry	Ruth Johnson
Popular vote	2,142,513	1,608,086
Percentage	56.4%	42.3%
- Granholm: 40–50% 50–60% 60–70% 70–80% 80–90% >90% DeVos: 40–50% 50–60% 60–70% 70–80% 80–90% Tie: 40–50% No data
Governor before election
Jennifer Granholm
Democratic
Elected Governor
Jennifer Granholm
Democratic

Michigan, like many other Midwestern states, had been unable to take advantage of reported national economic and job growth. A string of plant and factory closings by big name companies such as General Motors in Granholm's state led to growing disapproval of her among voters. Opposing her was wealthy Republican businessman Dick DeVos. Throughout the race polls showed the election to be close, but in the last days Granholm pulled ahead. According to a November 1 EPIC-MRA poll, Granholm led DeVos 52% to 43% with 5% undecided. A November 4 SurveyUSA poll had Granholm leading DeVos 51% to 45%. Ultimately, Democratic incumbent Jennifer Granholm was re-elected with 56.4 percent of the vote.

Michigan election
Party	Candidate	Votes	%
Democratic	Jennifer Granholm (incumbent)	2,142,513	56.36
Republican	Dick DeVos	1,608,086	42.30
Libertarian	Greg Creswell	23,524	0.62
Green	Douglas Campbell	20,009	0.53
Constitution	Bhagwan Dashairya	7,087	0.19
Write-in		37	0.00
Total votes		3,801,256	100.00
Democratic hold			

== Minnesota ==
Minnesota gubernatorial election
- November 7, 2006
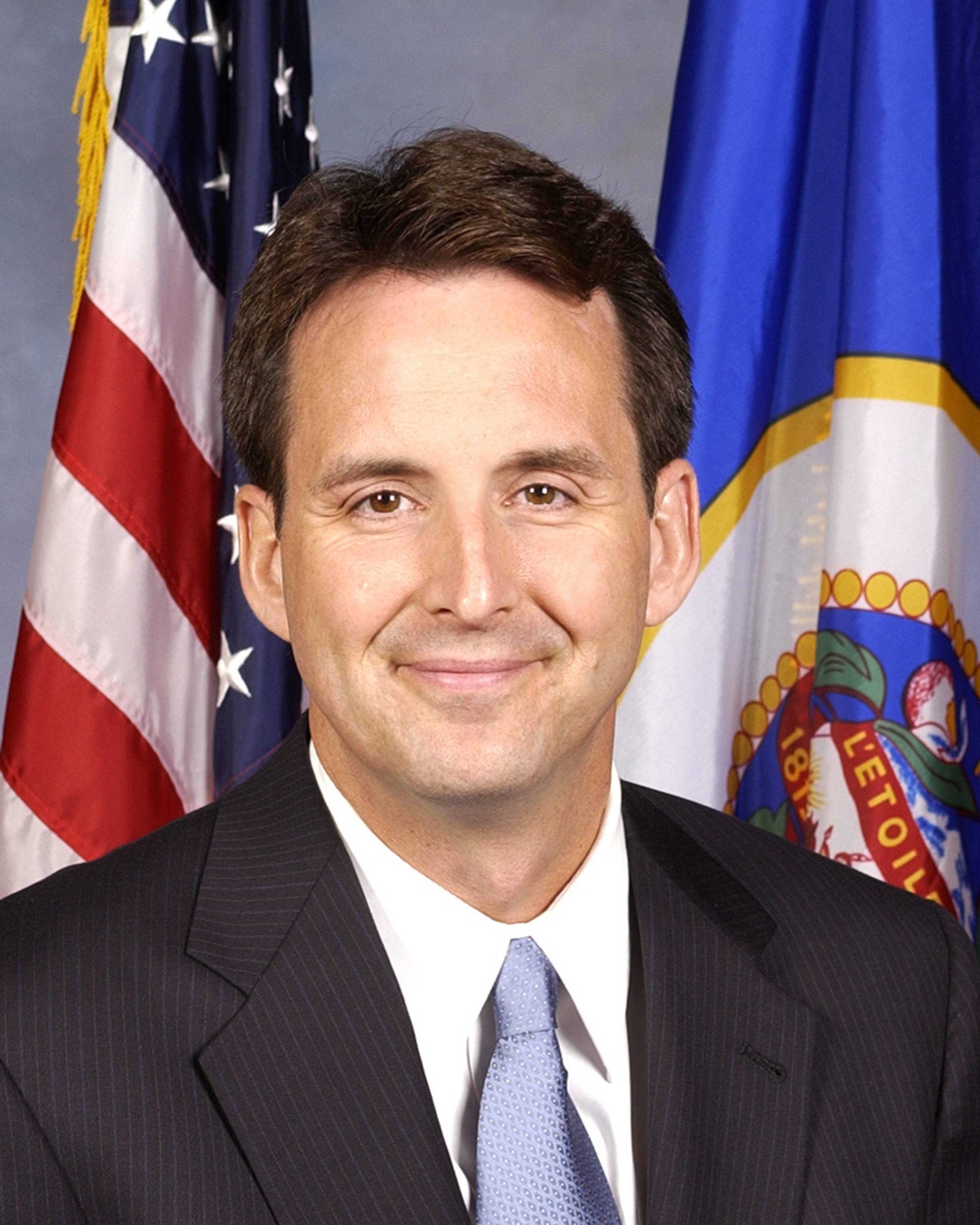

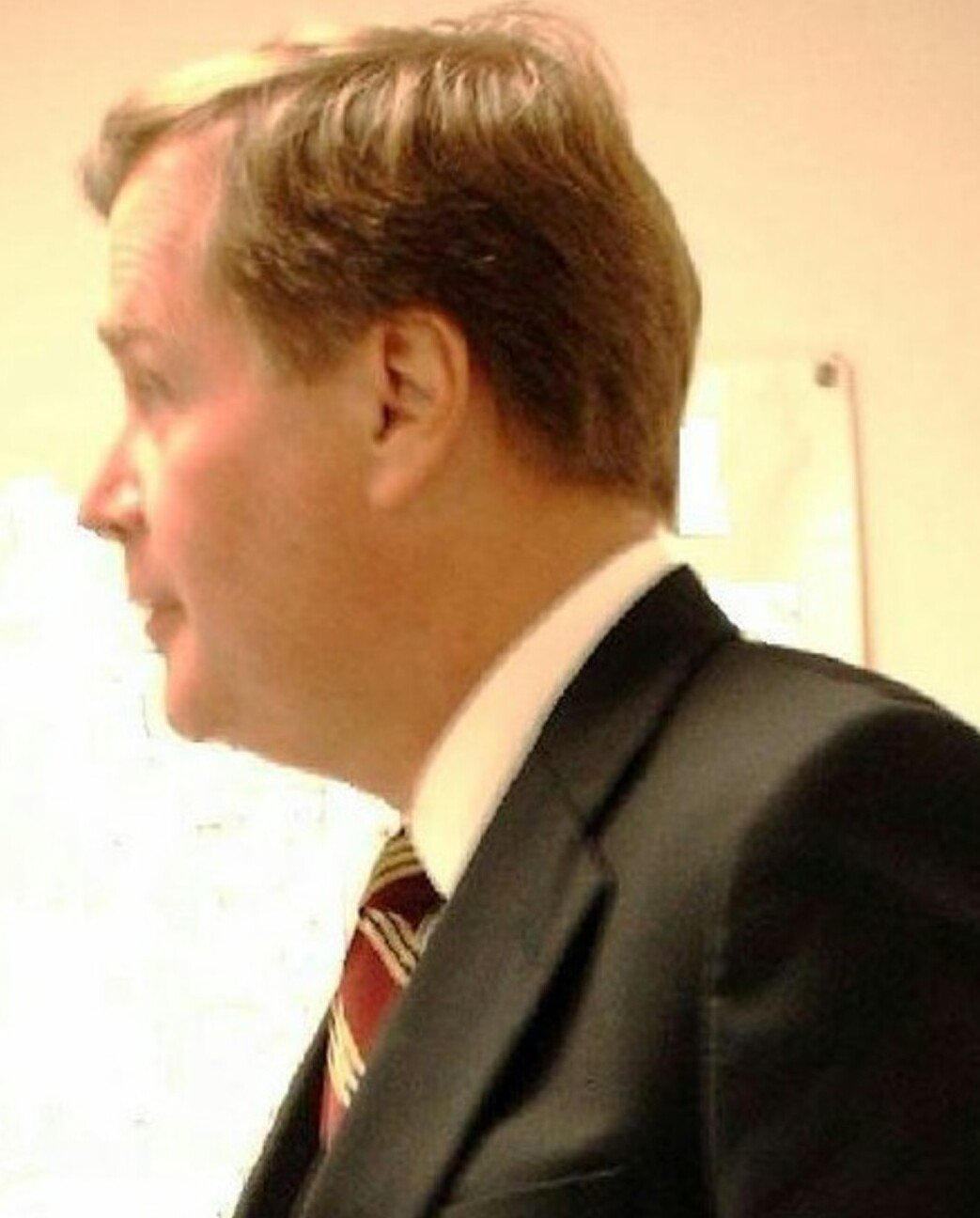

Nominee	Tim Pawlenty	Mike Hatch	Peter Hutchinson
Party	Republican	Democratic (DFL)	Independence
Running mate	Carol Molnau	Judi Dutcher	Maureen Reed
Popular vote	1,028,568	1,007,460	141,735
Percentage	46.7%	45.7%	6.4%
- Pawlenty: 40–50% 50–60% 60–70% 70–80% 80–90% >90% Hatch: 40–50% 50–60% 60–70% 70–80% 80–90% >90% Tie: 40–50% 50% No votes
Governor before election
Tim Pawlenty
Republican
Elected Governor
Tim Pawlenty
Republican

Pawlenty's approval rating was measured at 56% on September 21, 2006. In 2002, Pawlenty won the governor's mansion with only 44% of the vote, facing a strong challenge from DFL Party candidate Roger Moe and Independence Party candidate Tim Penny, a former DFLer himself. Pawlenty has been criticized by some Minnesotans for budget cuts to programs such as MinnesotaCare to balance the budget (and controversial moves such as deferring required payments to the state's education and health care funds to later budget biennia to make the budget appear balanced when it was actually not). Pawlenty faces another strong DFL challenge this year in state Attorney General Mike Hatch, who fended off a liberal primary challenge from State Senator Becky Lourey. Pawlenty and Hatch were virtually neck and neck, with between 40-45% support for both candidates as recently as September, until the Mark Foley scandal hit the papers late that month, and 5-6% for Independence Party candidate Peter Hutchinson.

An October 23 SurveyUSA poll has Hatch leading Pawlenty 45% to 44% and Hutchinson with 7%. A November 1 Saint Cloud Times poll has Hatch at 46% and Pawlenty at 36%. Republican incumbent Tim Pawlenty was re-elected.

Minnesota election
Party	Candidate	Votes	%
Republican	Tim Pawlenty (incumbent)	1,028,568	46.69
Democratic (DFL)	Mike Hatch	1,007,460	45.73
Independence	Peter Hutchinson	141,735	6.43
Green	Ken Pentel	10,800	0.49
Independent	Walt E. Brown	9,649	0.44
American	Leslie Davis	3,776	0.17
Write-in		949	0.04
Total votes		2,202,937	100.00
Republican hold			

== Nebraska ==
Nebraska gubernatorial election
- November 7, 2006
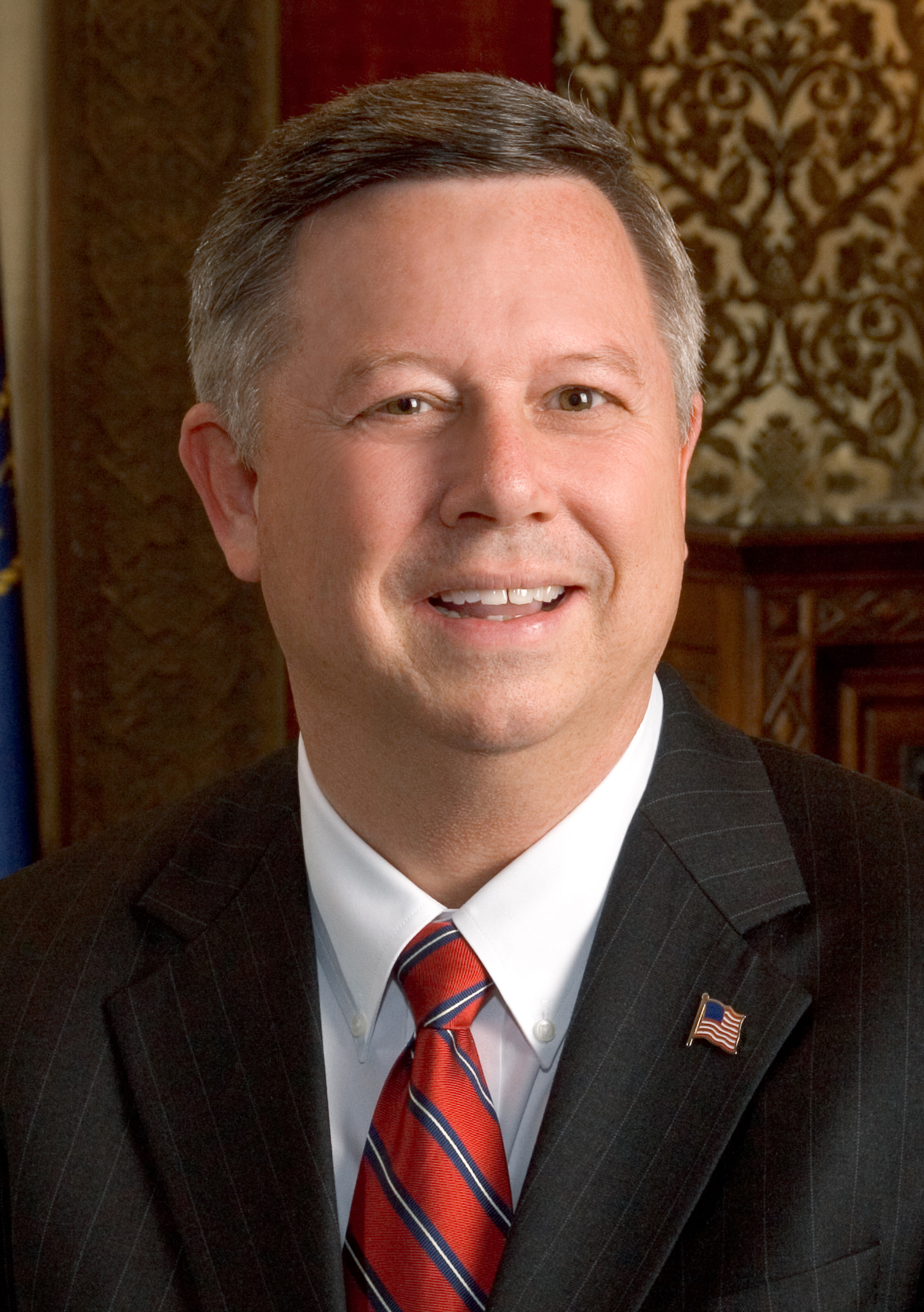

Nominee	Dave Heineman	David Hahn
Party	Republican	Democratic
Running mate	Rick Sheehy	Steve Loschen
Popular vote	434,802	144,624
Percentage	73.4%	24.5%
- Heineman: 40–50% 50–60% 60–70% 70–80% 80–90% >90% Hahn: 40–50% 50–60% 60–70% 70–80% 80–90% >90% Tie: 40–50% 50% No votes
Governor before election
Dave Heineman
Republican
Elected Governor
Dave Heineman
Republican

Primary elections were held on May 9, 2006. Republican incumbent Dave Heineman was elected to a full term, defeating Democrat David Hahn.

Nebraska election
Party	Candidate	Votes	%
Republican	Dave Heineman (incumbent)	435,507	73.40
Democratic	David Hahn	145,115	24.46
Nebraska	Barry Richards	8,953	1.51
Independent	Mort Sullivan	3,782	0.64
Total votes		593,357	100.00
Republican hold			

== Nevada ==
Nevada gubernatorial election
- November 7, 2006
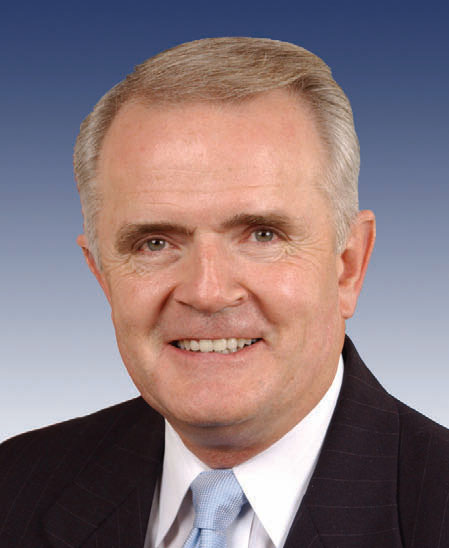

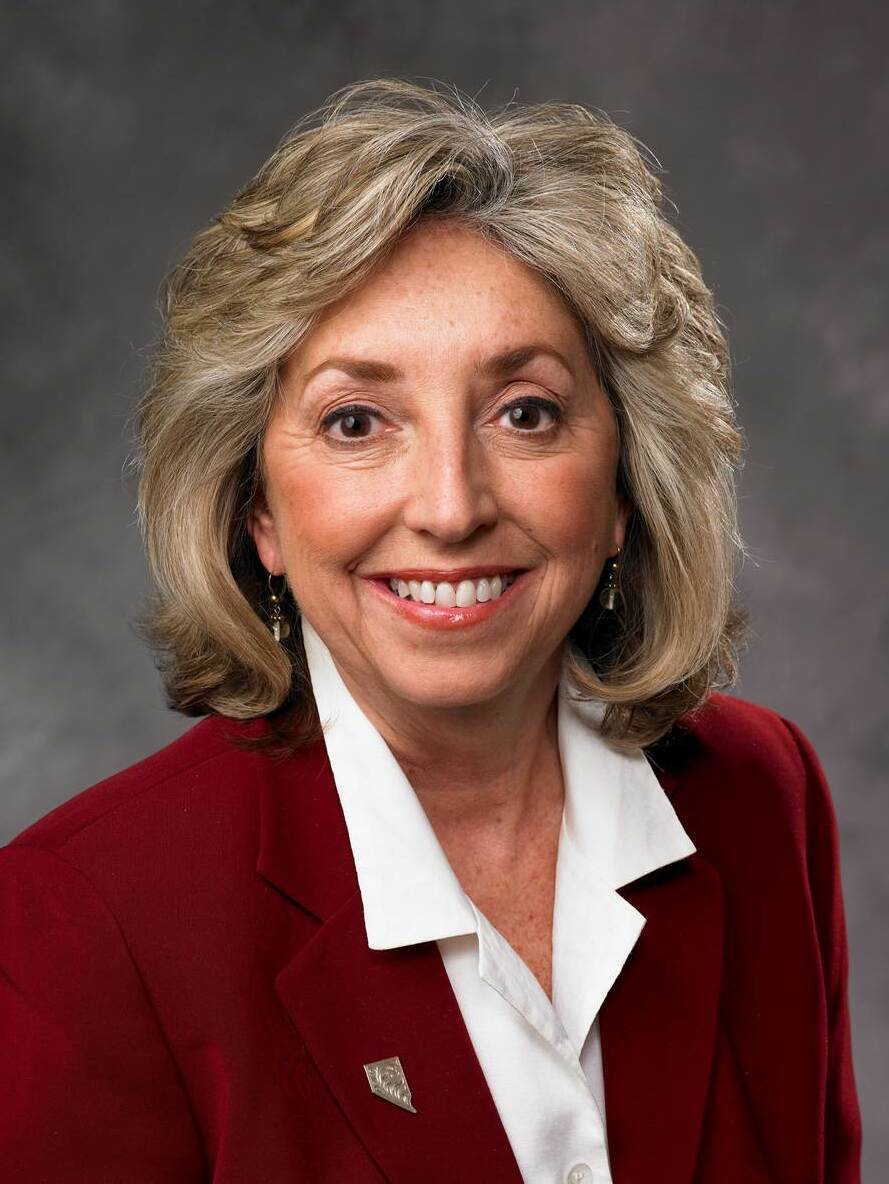
Nominee	Jim Gibbons	Dina Titus
Party	Republican	Democratic
Popular vote	279,003	255,684
Percentage	47.9%	43.9%
- County results Gibbons: 50–60% 60–70% 70–80% Titus: 40–50%
Governor before election
Kenny Guinn
Republican
Elected Governor
Jim Gibbons
Republican

Governor Kenny Guinn, a moderate Republican, was term-limited. His retirement resulted in competitive primaries in both parties. The Democratic nominee was State Senate Minority Leader Dina Titus, who won the primary with 54% of the vote over Henderson mayor Jim Gibson. The Republican nominee was Congressman Jim Gibbons, who won the primary with 48% of the vote, defeating state senator Bob Beers and Lieutenant Governor Lorraine Hunt. Gibbons, who then represented Nevada's 2nd congressional district, had a strong base in northern Nevada. Titus had a strong base in the Las Vegas Valley due to her legislative and education careers. An October 17 Rasmussen Reports poll put Gibbons ahead of Titus with a 51% to 43% lead. Polls in late October conducted by Mason-Dixon and Research 2000 indicated that Gibbons was on track to win the election.

Republican nominee Jim Gibbons was elected with 48% of the vote, a plurality. Titus received 44% of the vote and Christopher H. Hansen, the nominee of the Independent American Party of Nevada, received about 3%.

Nevada election
Party	Candidate	Votes	%
Republican	Jim Gibbons	279,003	47.93
Democratic	Dina Titus	255,684	43.92
None of These Candidates		20,699	3.56
Independent American	Christopher H. Hansen	20,019	3.44
Green	Craig Bergland	6,753	1.16
Total votes		582,158	100.00
Republican hold			

== New Hampshire ==
New Hampshire gubernatorial election
- November 7, 2006
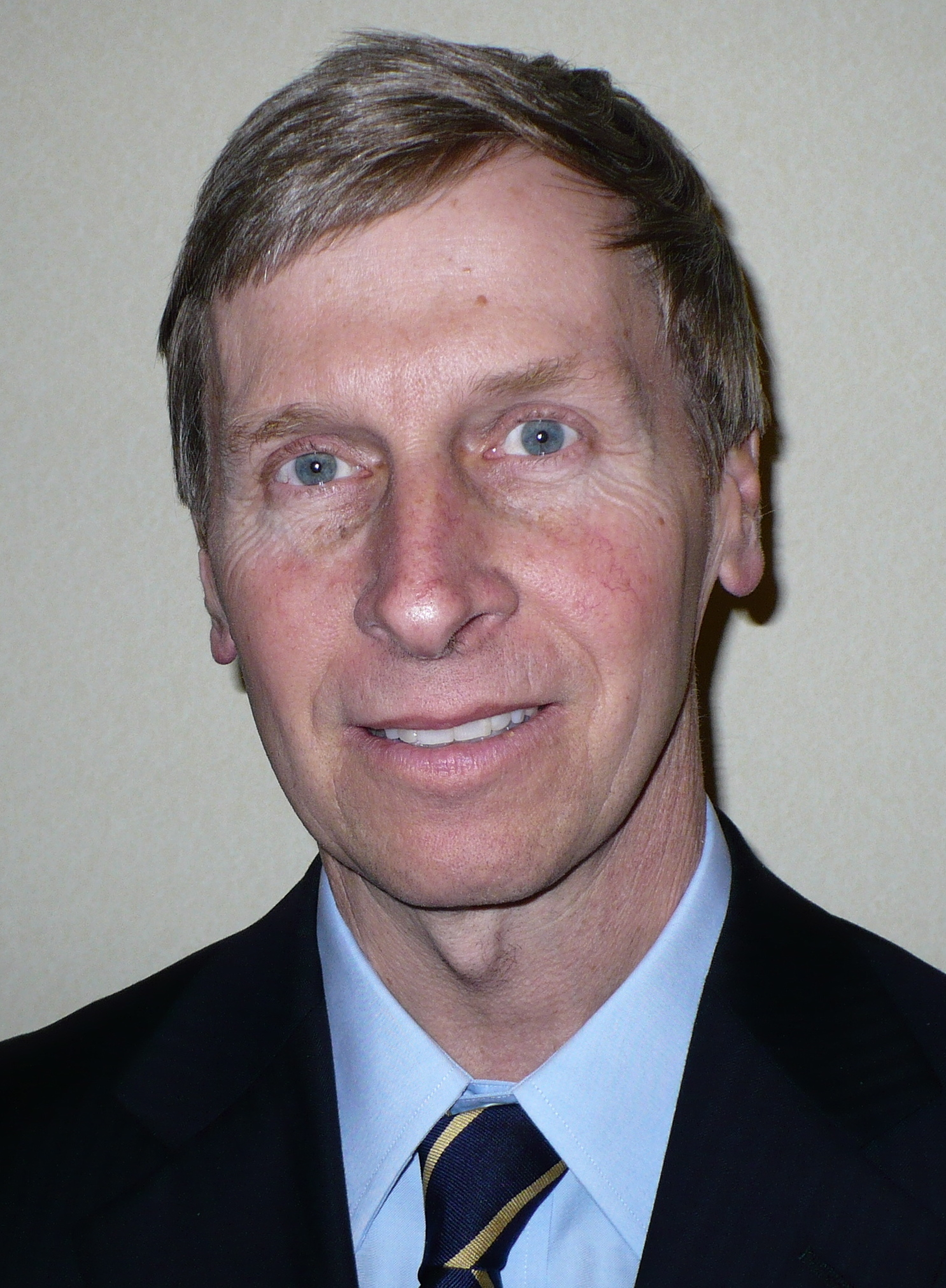

Nominee	John Lynch	Jim Coburn
Party	Democratic	Republican
Popular vote	298,760	104,288
Percentage	74.0%	25.8%
- Lynch: 50–60% 60–70% 70–80% 80–90% >90% Coburn: 50–60%
Governor before election
John Lynch
Democratic
Elected Governor
John Lynch
Democratic

Incumbent Democrat John Lynch defeated Republican James B. Coburn and won a second term as Governor of New Hampshire.

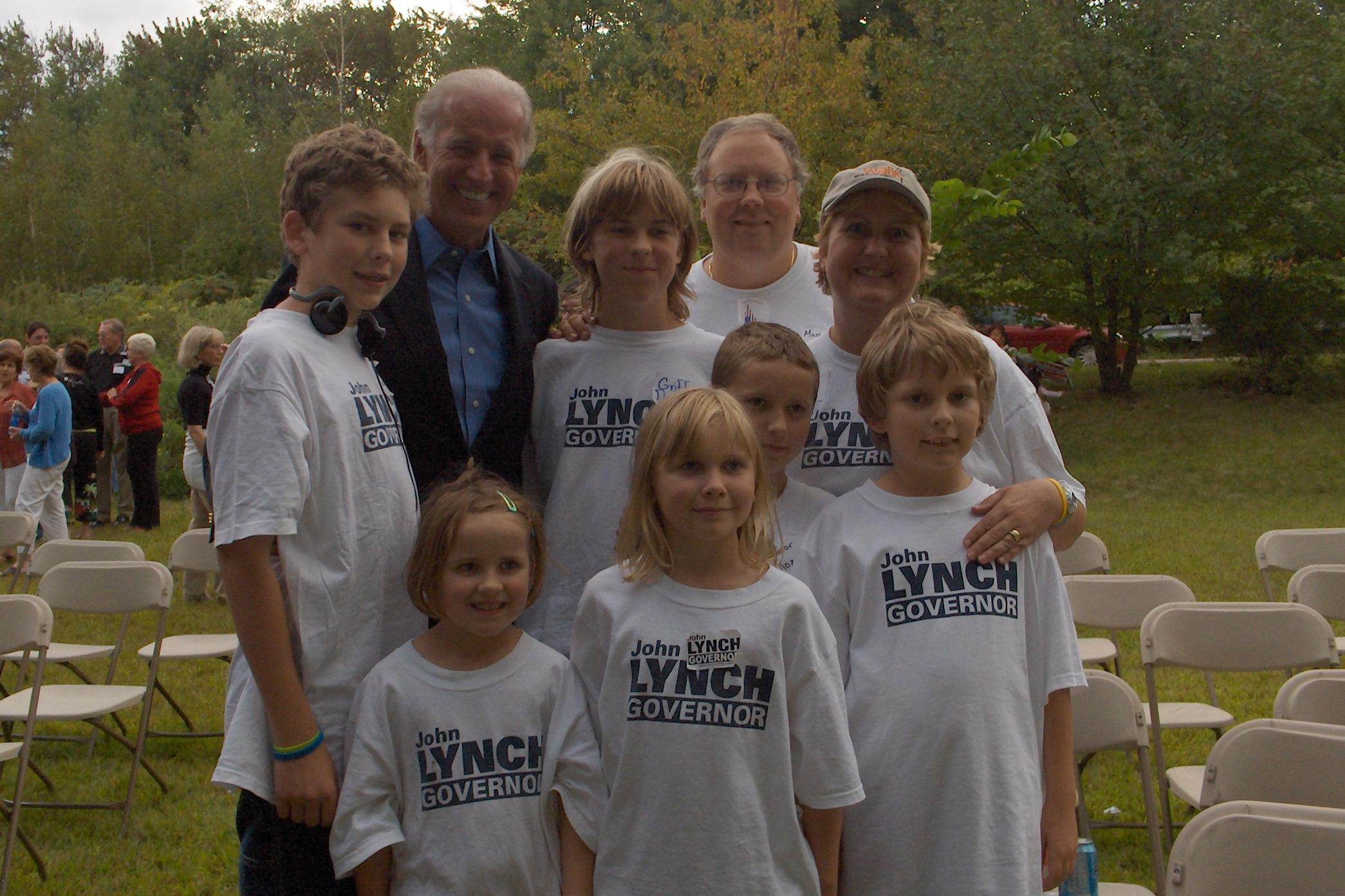
Governor John Lynch campaign in New Hampshire

New Hampshire election
Party	Candidate	Votes	%
Democratic	John Lynch	298,760	74.01
Republican	Jim Coburn	104,288	25.83
Write-in		631	0.16
Total votes		403,679	100.00
Democratic hold			

== New Mexico ==
New Mexico gubernatorial election
- November 7, 2006
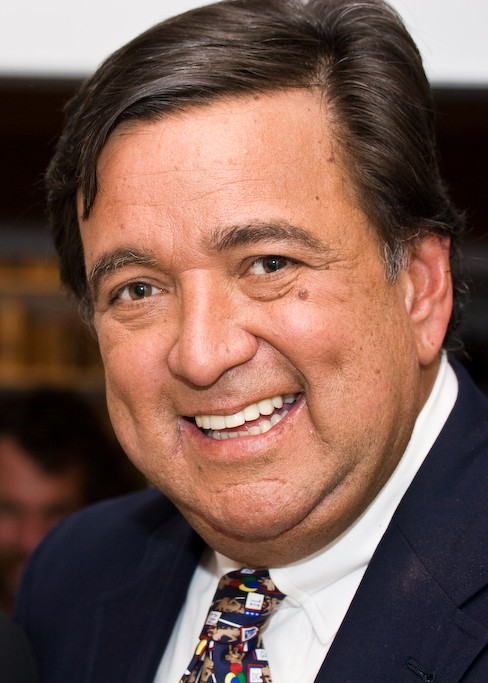

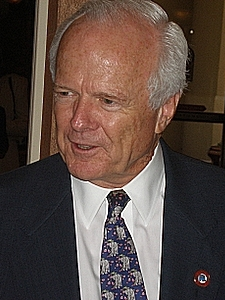
Nominee	Bill Richardson	John Dendahl
Party	Democratic	Republican
Running mate	Diane Denish	Sue Wilson Beffort
Popular vote	384,806	174,364
Percentage	68.8%	31.2%
- County results Richardson: 50–60% 60–70% 70–80% 80–90% Dendahl: 50–60%
Governor before election
Bill Richardson
Democratic
Elected Governor
Bill Richardson
Democratic

Incumbent Democratic governor Bill Richardson was running for re-election. He faced Republican John Dendahl in the general election and won by a landslide.

New Mexico election
Party	Candidate	Votes	%
Democratic	Bill Richardson (incumbent)	384,806	68.82
Republican	John Dendahl	174,364	31.18
Total votes		559,170	100.00
Democratic hold			

== New York ==
New York gubernatorial election
- November 7, 2006
- Turnout: 34.9%
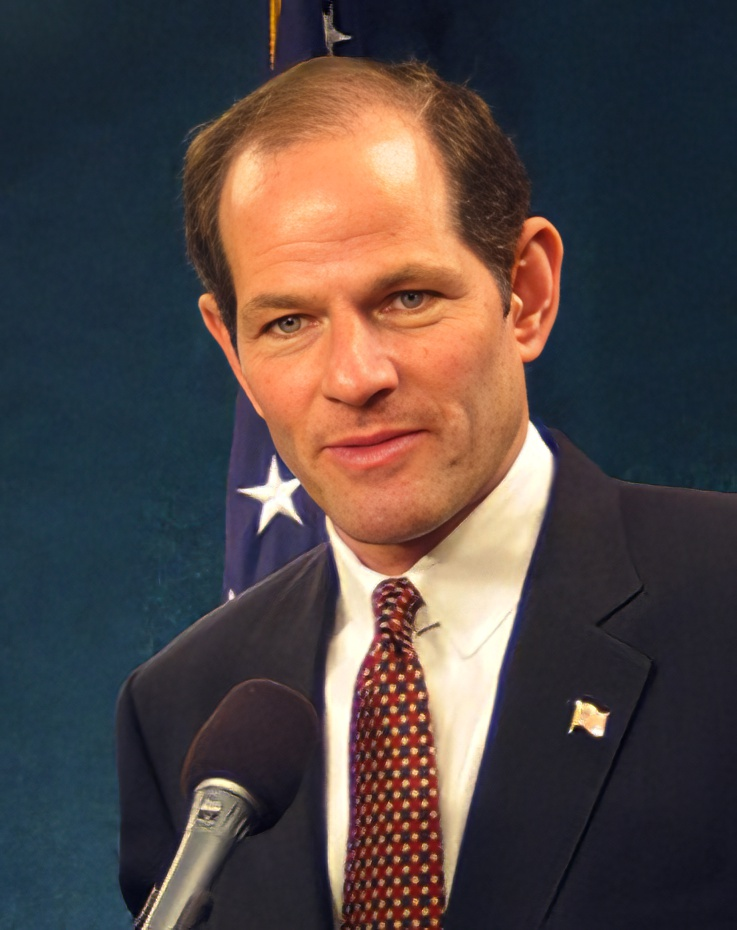

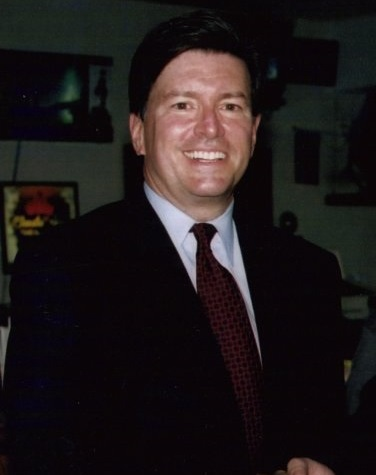
Nominee	Eliot Spitzer	John Faso
Party	Democratic	Republican
Alliance	Parties: Independence; Working Families	Conservative
Running mate	David Paterson	C. Scott Vanderhoef
Popular vote	3,086,709	1,274,335
Percentage	65.3%	27.1%
- County results Spitzer: 40–50% 50–60% 60–70% 70–80% 80–90% Faso: 40–50% 50–60%
Governor before election
George Pataki
Republican
Elected Governor
Eliot Spitzer
Democratic

Governor George Pataki, a moderate Republican, opted not to seek a fourth term in office. Without an incumbent in the race, the Democratic nominee was heavily favored to win the election. New York Attorney General Eliot Spitzer won the Democratic primary with 81% of the vote, defeating Nassau County Executive Tom Suozzi. As attorney general, Spitzer became well known for prosecuting cases relating to corporate white-collar crime, securities fraud, internet fraud and environmental protection. The Republican nominee was attorney John Faso, a former New York State Assembly minority leader. Throughout the race, polls showed Spitzer defeating Faso by a large margin.

Democratic nominee Eliot Spitzer was elected in a landslide, winning 58 out of the state's 62 counties and taking 65.3% of the vote.

Gubernatorial election in New York, 2006
Party	Candidate	Running mate	Votes	Percentage	Swing
Democratic	Eliot Spitzer		2,740,864	58.34%	▲26.84%
Independence	Eliot Spitzer		190,661	4.06%	▼10.22%
Working Families	Eliot Spitzer		155,184	3.30%	▲1.32%
Total	Eliot Spitzer	David Paterson	3,086,709	65.70%	▲32.20%
Republican	John Faso		1,105,681	23.54%	▼22.00%
Conservative	John Faso		168,654	3.59%	▼0.27%
Total	John Faso	C. Scott Vanderhoef	1,274,335	27.12%	▼22.28%
Green	Malachy McCourt	Brian Jones	42,166	0.89%	▼0.02%
Libertarian	John Clifton	Chris Edes	14,736	0.31%	▲0.20%
Rent Is Too Damn High	Jimmy McMillan	None	13,355	0.28%	N/A
Socialist Workers	Maura DeLuca	Ben O'Shaughnessy	5,919	0.13%	N/A
	Blank, Void, Scattering		116,622	5.55%	
Majority			1,812,374	38.58%	▲22.68%
Totals			4,437,220	100.00%	
Democratic gain from Republican			Swing		

== Ohio ==
Ohio gubernatorial election
- November 7, 2006
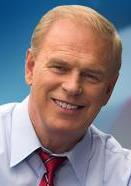

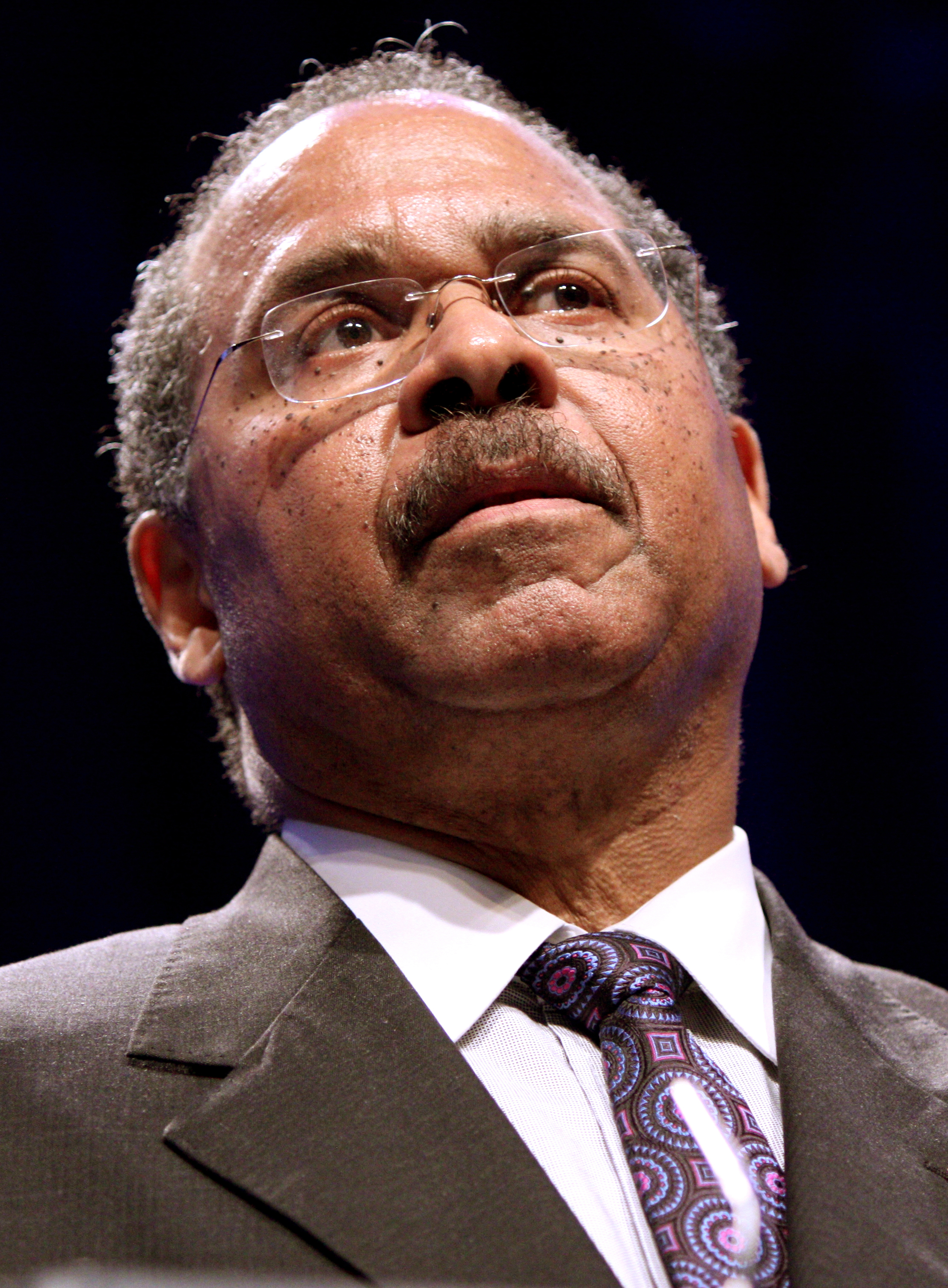
Nominee	Ted Strickland	Ken Blackwell
Party	Democratic	Republican
Running mate	Lee Fisher	Tom Raga
Popular vote	2,435,384	1,474,285
Percentage	60.5%	36.6%
- Strickland: 40–50% 50–60% 60–70% 70–80% 80–90% Blackwell: 40–50% 50–60% 60–70%
Governor before election
Bob Taft
Republican
Elected Governor
Ted Strickland
Democratic

Term-limited incumbent governor Bob Taft was viewed as one of the most unpopular governors in the history of Ohio. Polls showed his approval rating in the vicinity of 10% to 25%.

Congressman Ted Strickland won the Democratic primary with 79% of the vote, defeating state representative Bryan Flannery. The Republican primary, between Ohio Secretary of State Ken Blackwell and Ohio Attorney General Jim Petro, was more competitive by far. Petro came under fire for switching positions on same-sex marriage and abortion, as well as allegedly taking business from lawyers who refused to give him campaign contributions. Blackwell and Petro also split over proposals to reduce state spending. Blackwell ultimately won the primary with 56% of the vote.

Blackwell was not a close ally of disgraced Governor Taft, but Taft's unpopularity still damaged his campaign. The negativity of the Republican primary also damaged Blackwell's general election campaign. In addition, in 2006 there was a nationwide trend towards the Democratic Party. An October 6 poll by Rasmussen Reports showed that Strickland led by 52% to 40%, a decline from September. By contrast, an October 12 SurveyUSA poll had Strickland leading Blackwell 60% to 32%.

Democratic nominee Ted Strickland was elected with 60.5% of the vote. He became the first Democratic Governor of Ohio since Dick Celeste.

Ohio election
Party	Candidate	Votes	%
Democratic	Ted Strickland	2,435,384	60.54
Republican	Ken Blackwell	1,474,285	36.65
Libertarian	Bill Peirce	71,468	1.78
Green	Bob Fitrakis	40,965	1.02
Write-in		652	0.02
Total votes		4,022,754	100.00
Democratic gain from Republican			

== Oklahoma ==
Oklahoma gubernatorial election
- November 7, 2006
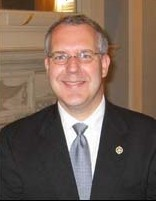

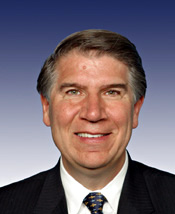
Nominee	Brad Henry	Ernest Istook
Party	Democratic	Republican
Popular vote	616,135	310,327
Percentage	66.5%	33.5%
- County results Henry: 50–60% 60–70% 70–80% 80–90% Istook: 50–60% 60–70%
Governor before election
Brad Henry
Democratic
Elected Governor
Brad Henry
Democratic

Incumbent Democratic governor Brad Henry won re-election to a second term in a landslide, defeating Republican U.S. representative Ernest Istook. Henry took 66.5% of the vote to Istook's 33.5% and swept all but three counties in the state.

Oklahoma election
Party	Candidate	Votes	%
Democratic	Brad Henry (incumbent)	616,135	66.50
Republican	Ernest Istook	310,327	33.50
Total votes		926,462	100.00
Democratic hold			

== Oregon ==
Oregon gubernatorial election
- November 7, 2006
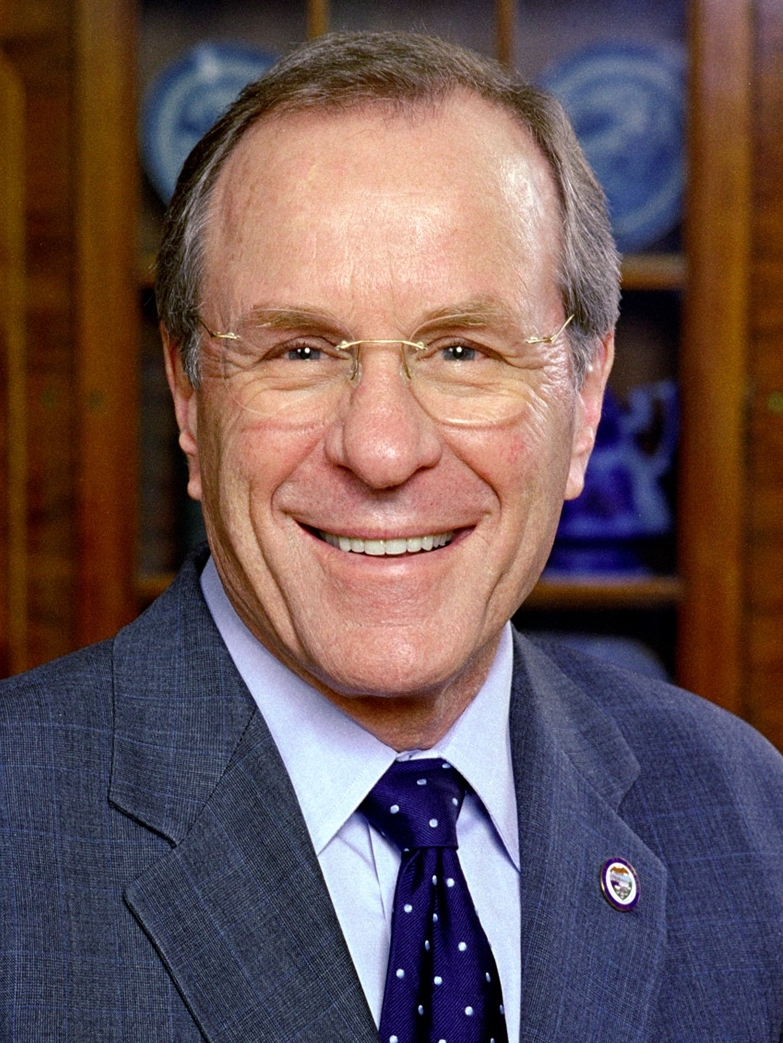

Nominee	Ted Kulongoski	Ron Saxton
Party	Democratic	Republican
Popular vote	699,786	589,748
Percentage	50.7%	42.8%
- County results Kulongoski: 40–50% 50–60% 60–70% Saxton: 40–50% 50–60% 60–70% 70–80%
Governor before election
Ted Kulongoski
Democratic
Elected Governor
Ted Kulongoski
Democratic

Democratic Governor Ted Kulongoski was elected in 2002 barely defeating former state representative Kevin Mannix. Kulongoski leads his challenger, former Portland Public School Board member Ron Saxton 51% to 44%. Oregon has not elected a Republican as governor since 1982, when Kulongoski lost to then-Governor Victor Atiyeh. Democratic incumbent Ted Kulongoski was re-elected.

Oregon election
Party	Candidate	Votes	%
Democratic	Ted Kulongoski (incumbent)	699,786	50.73
Republican	Ron Saxton	589,748	42.75
Constitution	Mary Starrett	50,229	3.64
Pacific Green	Joe Keating	20,030	1.45
Libertarian	Richard Morley	16,798	1.22
Write-in		2,884	0.21
Total votes		1,379,475	100.00
Democratic hold			

== Pennsylvania ==
Pennsylvania gubernatorial election
- November 7, 2006
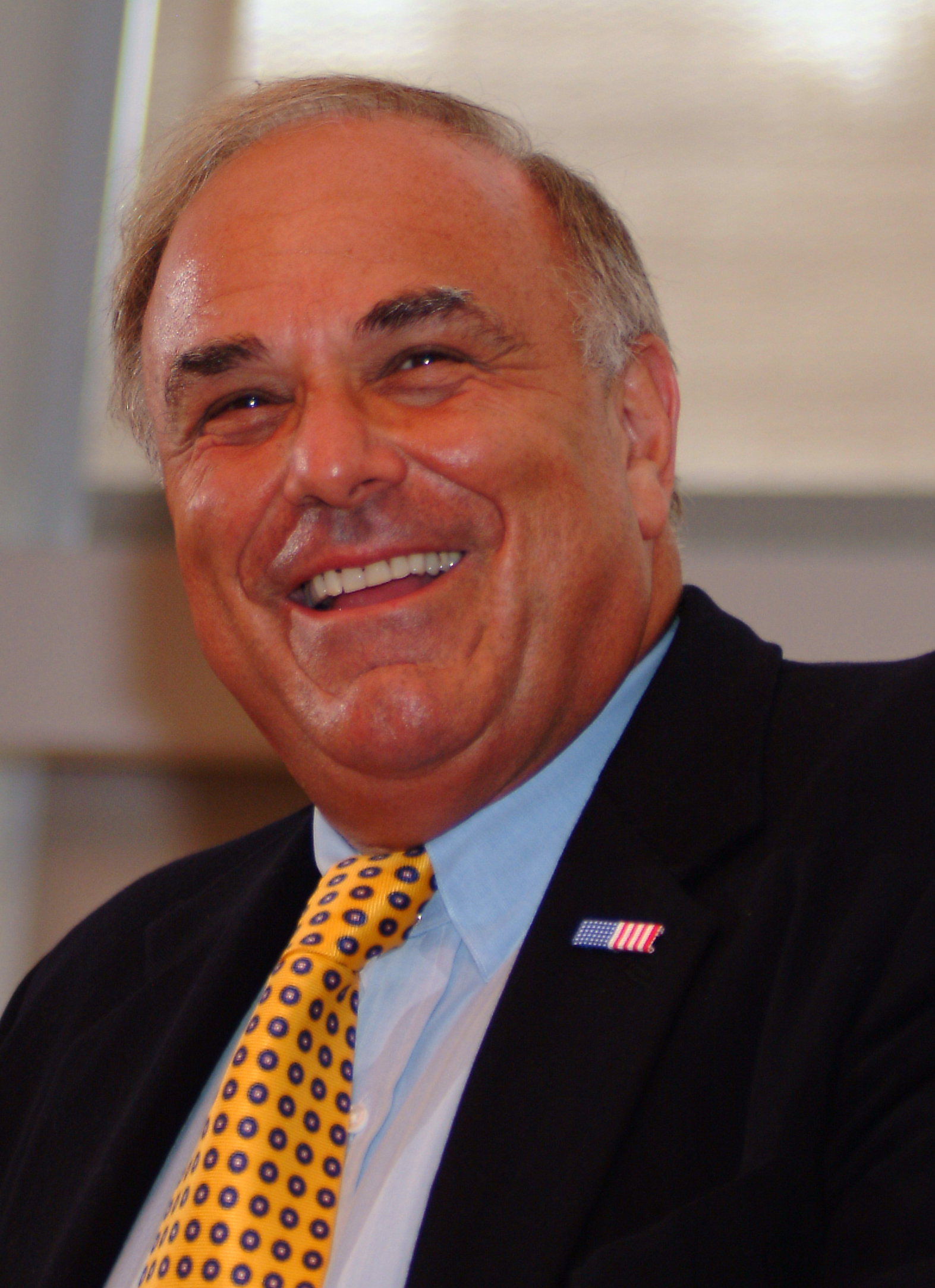

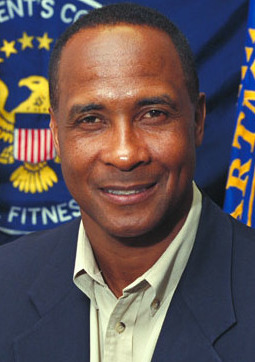
Nominee	Ed Rendell	Lynn Swann
Party	Democratic	Republican
Running mate	Catherine Baker Knoll	Jim Matthews
Popular vote	2,470,517	1,622,135
Percentage	60.4%	39.6%
- Swann: 50–60% 60–70% 70–80% 80–90% >90% Rendell: 50–60% 60–70% 70–80% 80–90% >90% Tie: 50% No data
Governor before election
Ed Rendell
Democratic
Elected Governor
Ed Rendell
Democratic

Incumbent Democratic governor Ed Rendell successfully ran for re-election. Pennsylvania's first female lieutenant governor, Catherine Baker Knoll, was also running for re-election.

Pennsylvania election
Party	Candidate	Votes	%
Democratic	Ed Rendell (incumbent)	2,470,517	60.33
Republican	Lynn Swann	1,622,135	39.61
Write-in		2,670	0.06
Total votes		4,095,322	100.00
Democratic hold			

== Rhode Island ==
Rhode Island gubernatorial election
- November 7, 2006
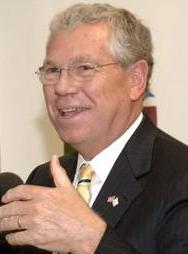

Nominee	Donald Carcieri	Charles J. Fogarty
Party	Republican	Democratic
Popular vote	197,306	189,503
Percentage	51.0%	49.0%
- Carcieri: 50–60% 60–70% 70–80% Fogarty: 50–60% 60–70% 70–80%
Governor before election
Donald Carcieri
Republican
Elected Governor
Donald Carcieri
Republican

Polling in the race showed Donald Carcieri, Republican governor in one of the most liberal states in the country, running even with his Democratic challenger, Lieutenant Governor Charles J. Fogarty. Carcieri was re-elected with 51% of the vote.

Rhode Island election
Party	Candidate	Votes	%
Republican	Donald Carcieri (incumbent)	197,306	51.01
Democratic	Charles J. Fogarty	189,503	48.99
Total votes		386,809	100.00
Republican hold			

== South Carolina ==
South Carolina gubernatorial election
- November 7, 2006
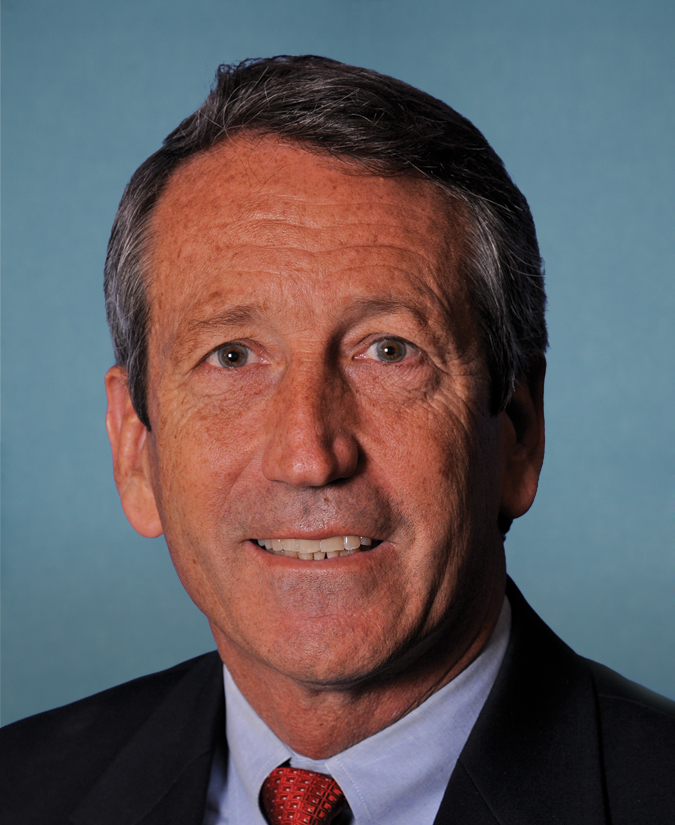

Nominee	Mark Sanford	Tommy Moore
Party	Republican	Democratic
Popular vote	601,868	489,076
Percentage	55.1%	44.8%
- County results Sanford: 50–60% 60–70% Moore: 50–60% 60–70% 70–80%
Governor before election
Mark Sanford
Republican
Elected Governor
Mark Sanford
Republican

Incumbent Republican Governor Mark Sanford won re-election against Democratic State Senator Tommy Moore, becoming only the third Republican governor in South Carolina to win a second term (Robert Kingston Scott and Carroll A. Campbell Jr. were the others). Sanford started the campaign with a double-digit edge over Moore and he maintained that lead to election day. During the course of the campaign, Sanford's approval rating averaged in the mid-fifties. In Sanford's re-election victory, he also garnered 22% of the African American vote.

South Carolina election
Party	Candidate	Votes	%
Republican	Mark Sanford (incumbent)	601,868	55.12
Democratic	Tommy Moore	489,076	44.79
Write-in		1,008	0.09
Total votes		1,091,952	100.00
Republican hold			

== South Dakota ==
South Dakota gubernatorial election
- November 7, 2006
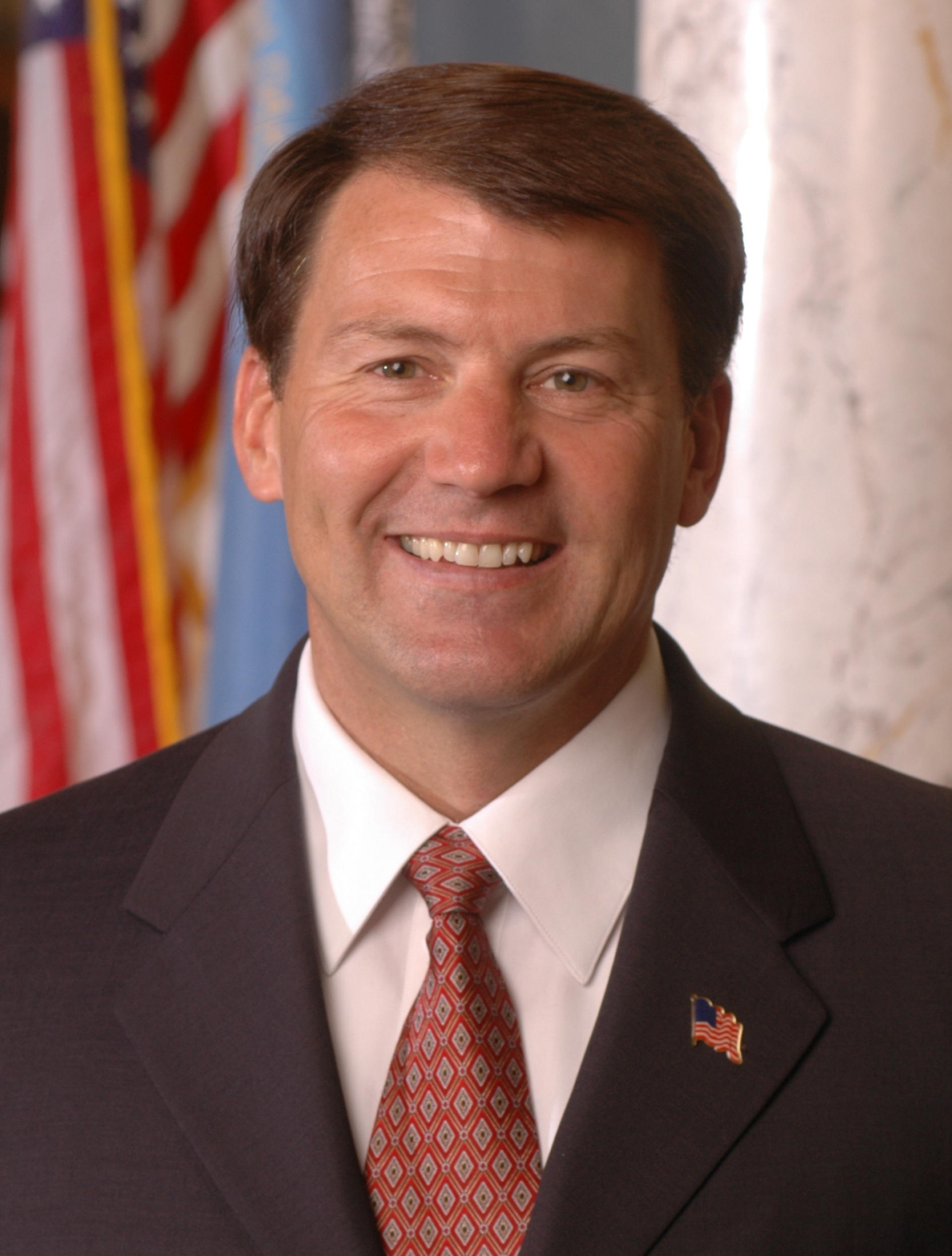

Nominee	Mike Rounds	Jack Billion
Party	Republican	Democratic
Running mate	Dennis Daugaard	Eric Abrahamson
Popular vote	206,990	121,226
Percentage	61.7%	36.1%
- County results Rounds: 50–60% 60–70% 70-80% 80–90% Billion: 40–50% 50–60% 60–70%
Governor before election
Mike Rounds
Republican
Elected Governor
Mike Rounds
Republican

Incumbent Republican governor Mike Rounds defeated Democrat Jack Billion to serve a second term as governor.

South Dakota election
Party	Candidate	Votes	%
Republican	Mike Rounds (incumbent)	206,990	61.69
Democratic	Jack Billion	121,226	36.13
Constitution	Steven J. Willis	4,010	1.20
Libertarian	Tom Gerber	3,282	0.98
Total votes		335,508	100.00
Republican hold			

== Tennessee ==
Tennessee gubernatorial election
- November 7, 2006
- Turnout: 49.97% ▼0.43 pp
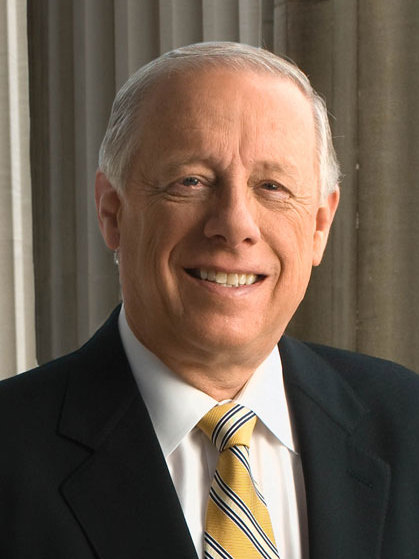

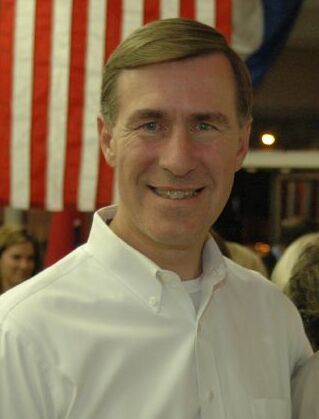
Nominee	Phil Bredesen	Jim Bryson
Party	Democratic	Republican
Popular vote	1,247,491	540,853
Percentage	68.6%	29.7%
- County results Bredesen: 50–60% 60–70% 70–80% 80–90%
Governor before election
Phil Bredesen
Democratic
Elected Governor
Phil Bredesen
Democratic

Incumbent Democratic governor Phil Bredesen defeated Republican state senator Jim Bryson in a landslide with 68.6% of the vote, winning every county in the state.

Primary elections were held on August 3, 2006.

As of 2026, this was the last time a Democrat won a majority of counties in the state, the last time a Democrat won any statewide race in Tennessee, and the most recent statewide election in Tennessee in which 88 of the state's 95 counties, including Knox County and Hamilton County, went to the Democratic candidate. Only Davidson, Shelby, Haywood, Hardeman, Houston, Jackson, and Lake counties have voted for a Democratic candidate in a presidential, Senate, or gubernatorial race since 2006, with Jackson and Lake only going Democratic once. Eight years later, Republican governor Bill Haslam won every county in the state when he won re-election. This marked a sharp political shift in Tennessee.

Tennessee election
Party	Candidate	Votes	%
Democratic	Phil Bredesen (incumbent)	1,247,491	68.60
Republican	Jim Bryson	540,853	29.74
Independent	Carl Two Feathers Whitaker	11,374	0.63
Independent	George Banks	7,531	0.41
Independent	Charles E. Smith	4,083	0.22
Independent	Howard W. Switzer	2,711	0.15
Independent	David Gatchell	2,385	0.13
Independent	Marivuana Stout Leinoff	2,114	0.12
Write-in		7	0.00
Total votes		1,818,549	100.00
Democratic hold			

== Texas ==
Texas gubernatorial election
- November 7, 2006
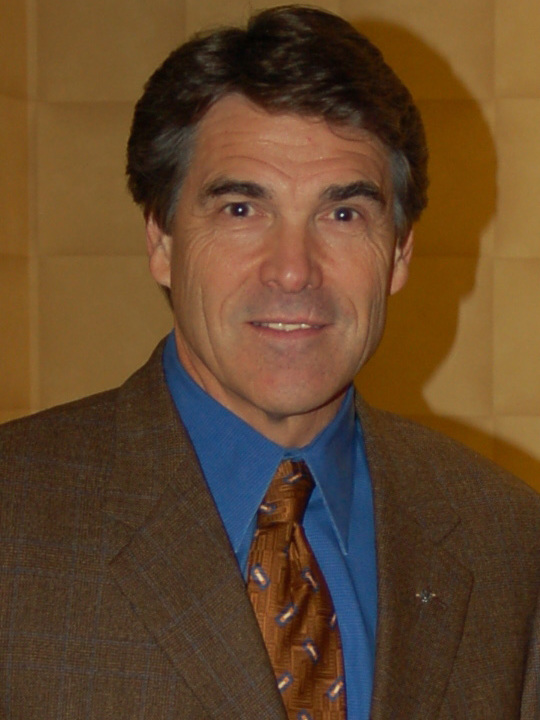

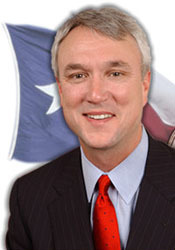

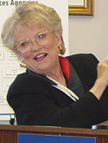

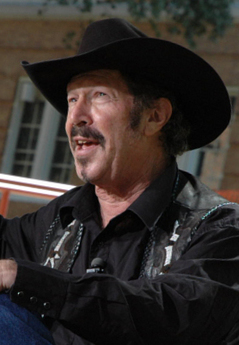
Nominee	Rick Perry	Chris Bell
Party	Republican	Democratic
Popular vote	1,716,803	1,310,353
Percentage	39.0%	29.8%
Nominee	Carole Keeton Strayhorn	Kinky Friedman
Party	Independent	Independent
Popular vote	797,577	546,869
Percentage	18.1%	12.4%
- County results Perry: 20–30% 30–40% 40–50% 50–60% 60–70% Bell: 30–40% 40–50% 50–60% 60–70% Strayhorn: 20–30% 30–40% 40–50%
Governor before election
Rick Perry
Republican
Elected Governor
Rick Perry
Republican

Challenges from two popular independents, coupled with Perry's mediocre approval ratings, made the race interesting. Populist state Comptroller Carole Keeton Strayhorn decided to defect from the GOP and run against Perry, her bitter political foe, as an independent. Six weeks after the announcement of her candidacy, she moved to within single digits of Perry in polls. In addition to Perry and Strayhorn, former congressman Chris Bell ran as the Democratic candidate, with country singer and Texas icon Kinky Friedman as another independent. This resulted in a peculiar four-way race (technically, a six-way race including the Libertarian candidate and a write-in candidate) in which no run-off would take place. Perry was elected to a second full term with just 39% of the vote.

Texas election
Party	Candidate	Votes	%
Republican	Rick Perry (incumbent)	1,716,803	39.03
Democratic	Chris Bell	1,310,353	29.79
Independent	Carole Keeton Strayhorn	797,577	18.13
Independent	Kinky Friedman	546,869	12.43
Libertarian	James Werner	26,748	0.61
Write-in		718	0.02
Total votes		4,399,068	100.00
Republican hold			

== Vermont ==
Vermont gubernatorial election
- November 7, 2006
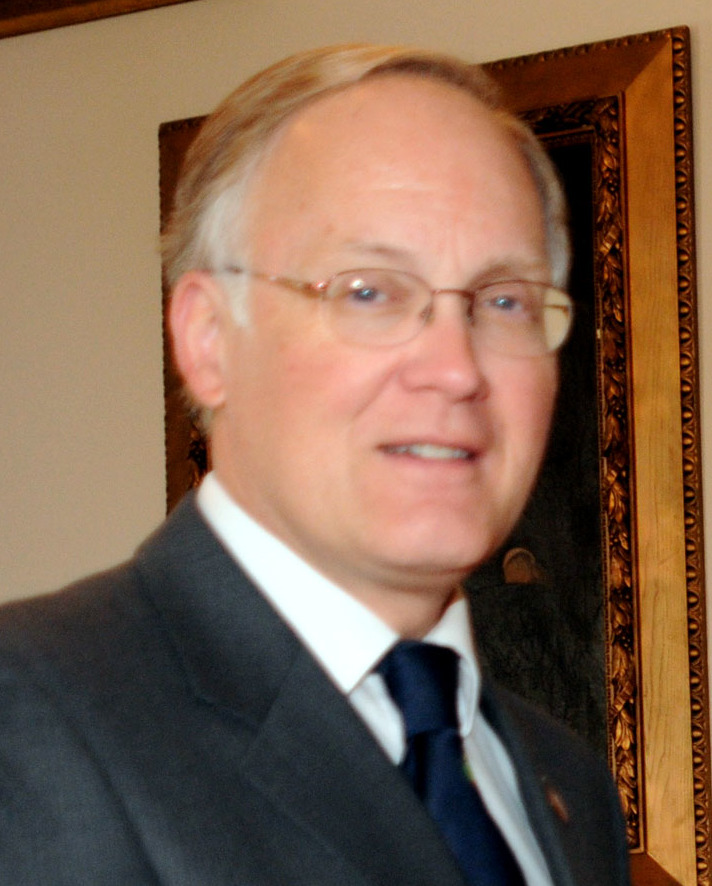

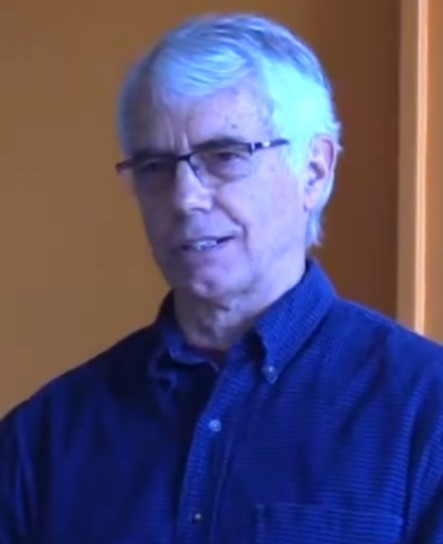
Nominee	Jim Douglas	Scudder Parker
Party	Republican	Democratic
Popular vote	148,014	108,090
Percentage	56.3%	41.1%
- Douglas: 40–50% 50–60% 60–70% 70–80% 80–90% Parker: 40–50% 50–60% 60–70% 70–80%
Governor before election
Jim Douglas
Republican
Elected Governor
Jim Douglas
Republican

Incumbent Republican Governor Jim Douglas won re-election to a third term, defeating Democratic nominee Scudder Parker.

Vermont election
Party	Candidate	Votes	%
Republican	Jim Douglas (incumbent)	148,014	56.38
Democratic	Scudder Parker	108,090	41.17
Independent	Cris Ericson	2,477	0.94
Green	Jim Hogue	1,936	0.74
Independent	Benjamin Clarke	1,216	0.46
Liberty Union	Robert Skold	638	0.24
Write-in		153	0.06
Total votes		262,524	100.00
Republican hold			

== Wisconsin ==
Wisconsin gubernatorial election
- November 7, 2006
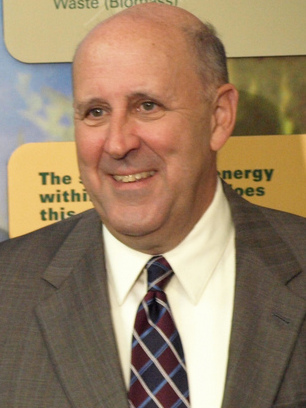

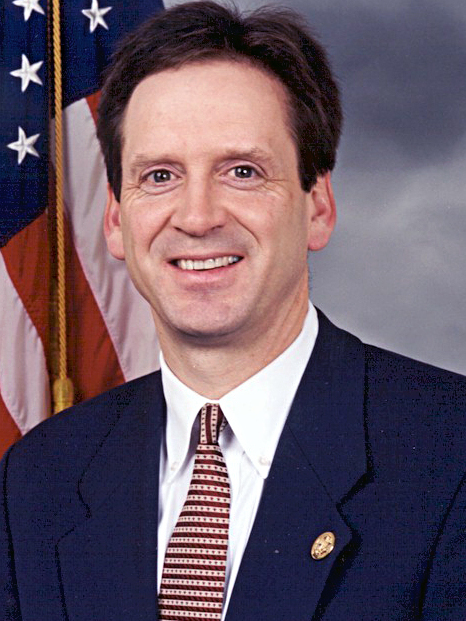
Nominee	Jim Doyle	Mark Green
Party	Democratic	Republican
Popular vote	1,139,115	979,427
Percentage	52.7%	45.3%
- Doyle: 30–40% 40–50% 50–60% 60–70% 70–80% 80–90% >90% Green: 40–50% 50–60% 60–70% 70–80% 80–90% >90% Tie: 40–50% 50% No data
Governor before election
Jim Doyle
Democratic
Elected Governor
Jim Doyle
Democratic

In 2002, Doyle was elected with only 45 percent of the vote because of an unusually strong challenge from the Libertarian party. Although his early 2006 approval rating was a mildly unfavorable 45 percent, he led both Republican challengers, Milwaukee County Executive Scott Walker and Congressman Mark Green by six to nine points in polls; he has not been able to poll greater than fifty percent. Green got a big break when Walker dropped out of the race. And more recent polls show that Green has pulled even. Wisconsin is a swing state in the strongest sense, with George W. Bush losing the state by some 5,700 votes in 2000 and around 12,400 votes in 2004, although they hadn't voted for a Republican for president since 1984, and they hadn't had a Republican senator since 1993. An October 18 Rasmussen Reports poll has Doyle leading Green 48% to 44% and an October 31 Research 2000 poll has Doyle leading Green 50% to 44%. Democratic incumbent Jim Doyle was re-elected.

Wisconsin election
Party	Candidate	Votes	%
Democratic	Jim Doyle (incumbent)	1,139,115	52.76
Republican	Mark A. Green	979,427	45.36
Green	Nelson Eisman	40,709	1.89
Total votes		2,159,251	100.00
Democratic hold			

== Wyoming ==
2006 Wyoming gubernatorial election
- November 7, 2006
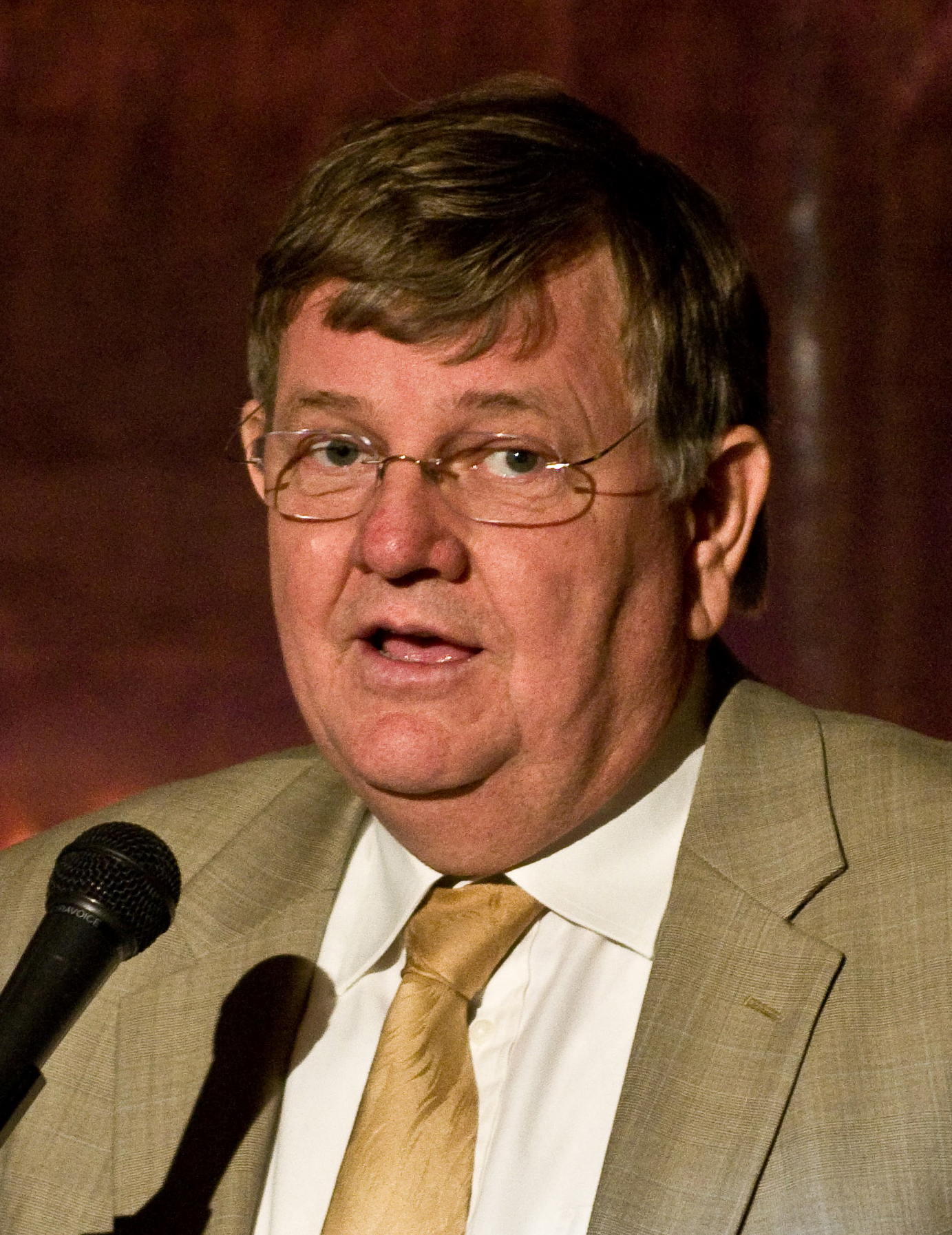

Nominee	Dave Freudenthal	Ray Hunkins
Party	Democratic	Republican
Popular vote	135,516	58,100
Percentage	70.0%	30.0%
- County results Freudenthal: 50–60% 60–70% 70–80% 80–90%
Governor before election
Dave Freudenthal
Democratic
Elected Governor
Dave Freudenthal
Democratic

Incumbent Democratic governor Dave Freudenthal won re-election in a landslide over Republican Ray Hunkins, becoming the first Democrat since 1910 to win every county in the state. To date this was the last time a Democrat was elected to statewide office in Wyoming, the last time a Democrat carried every county in the state, the last gubernatorial election in which a Democrat received more than 30% of the vote, and the last statewide election in which a Democrat received more than 45% of the vote.

Wyoming election
Party	Candidate	Votes	%
Democratic	Dave Freudenthal (incumbent)	135,516	69.99
Republican	Ray Hunkins	58,100	30.01
Total votes		193,616	100.00
Democratic hold			

== Territories and federal district ==
=== District of Columbia ===
District of Columbia mayoral election
- November 7, 2006
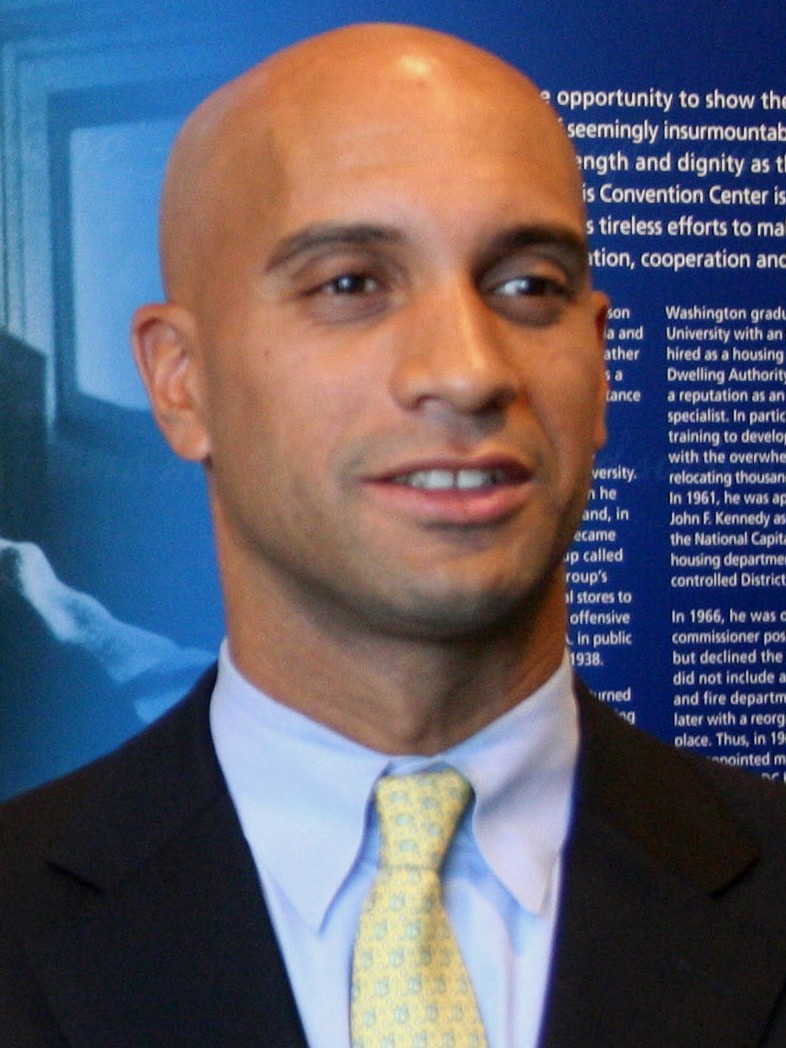

Nominee	Adrian Fenty	David Kranich
Party	Democratic	Republican
Popular vote	98,740	6,744
Percentage	89.7%	6.1%
- Results by ward: Fenty—>90% Fenty—80–90%
Mayor before election
Anthony A. Williams
Democratic
Elected mayor
Adrian Fenty
Democratic

The Democratic primary was held on September 12. The winner of that and general election was Adrian Fenty, the representative for Ward 4 on the D.C. Council. He took office on January 2, 2007, becoming the sixth directly elected mayor since the establishment of home rule in the District, and — at 35 — the youngest elected mayor of a major American city in U.S. history.

Washington, D.C. election
Party	Candidate	Votes	%
Democratic	Adrian Fenty	98,740	89.73
Republican	David Kranich	6,744	6.13
DC Statehood Green	Chris Otten	4,554	4.14
Total votes		110,038	100.00
Democratic hold			

=== Guam ===
Guamanian gubernatorial election
- November 7, 2006
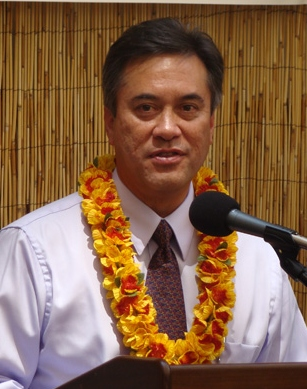

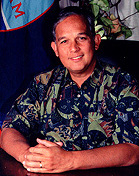
Nominee	Felix Perez Camacho	Robert Underwood
Party	Republican	Democratic
Running mate	Michael Cruz	Frank Aguon
Popular vote	19,560	18,700
Percentage	50.25%	48.04%
Governor before election
Felix Perez Camacho
Republican
Elected Governor
Felix Perez Camacho
Republican

In the U.S. territory of Guam, in the western Pacific Ocean, Republican governor Felix P. Camacho was challenged by Democrat Robert Underwood. A former Guam delegate-at-large in the U.S. House of Representatives, Underwood had previously represented Guam from 1993 to 2003. The race was a rematch of the 2002 gubernatorial election in which Camacho handily defeated Underwood and won his first term in office by 10 points (see Politics of Guam). However, the race was significantly more close and competitive in 2006, with Camacho narrowly winning re-election by a 2-point margin over Underwood.

Guam election
Party	Candidate	Votes	%
Republican	Felix Perez Camacho (incumbent)	19,560	50.25
Democratic	Robert A. Underwood	18,700	48.04
Write-in		668	1.72
Total votes		38,928	100.00
Republican hold			

=== U.S. Virgin Islands ===
2006 United States Virgin Islands gubernatorial election
- November 7, 2006 (first round); November 21, 2006 (runoff)
- Turnout: 29,046
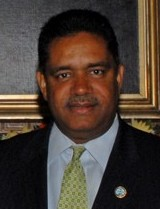

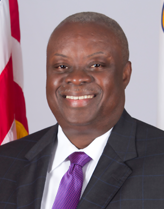
Nominee	John de Jongh	Kenneth Mapp
Party	Democratic	Independent
Running mate	Gregory Francis	Almando Liburd
Popular vote	16,644	12,402
Percentage	57.3%	42.7%
Governor before election
Charles Wesley Turnbull
Democratic
Elected Governor
John de Jongh
Democratic

U.S. Virgin Islands election
Party	Candidate	Votes	%
Democratic	John de Jongh Jr.	16,644	57.30
Independent	Kenneth Mapp	12,402	42.70
Total votes		29,046	100.00
Democratic hold			

== See also ==
- 2006 United States elections
  - 2006 United States Senate elections
  - 2006 United States House of Representatives elections
