= Tracy Ryan =

Tracy Ryan may refer to:

- Tracy Ryan (writer), Australian poet and novelist
- Tracy Ryan (actress), Canadian actress
- Tracy Ryan, in United States gubernatorial elections, 2002
