= 2002 United States gubernatorial elections =

- November 5, 2002

38 governorships 36 states; 2 territories
	Majority party	Minority party
Party	Republican	Democratic
Seats before	27	21
Seats after	26	24
Seat change	▼1	▲3
Popular vote	30,843,168	27,777,088
Percentage	49.37%	44.47%
Seats up	23	11
Seats won	22	14
	Third party	Fourth party
Party	Independent	Independence
Seats before	1	1
Seats after	0	0
Seat change	▼1	▼1
Popular vote	524,973	364,534 (Note: Vote total does not include votes for the Reform Party or the Independence Party of New York.)
Percentage	0.84%	0.58%
Seats up	1	1
Seats won	0	0
- Map of the results Republican hold Republican gain Democratic hold Democratic gain No election

United States gubernatorial elections were held on November 5, 2002, in 36 states and two territories. The Republicans won eight seats previously held by the Democrats, as well as the seat previously held by Minnesota governor Jesse Ventura, who was elected on the Reform Party ticket but had since renounced his party affiliation. The Democrats won 10 seats previously held by the Republicans, as well as the seat previously held by Maine governor Angus King, an independent. The elections were held concurrently with the other United States elections of 2002.

Overall, despite the gains that they made at the federal level – an unprecedented feat in a midterm election – the Republicans suffered a net loss of one seat in this gubernatorial election cycle, while the Democrats made a net gain of three. The Republicans managed to maintain their majority of state governorships, but it was reduced to a margin of only two seats. The elections were notable for the sheer number of state governorships that changed parties – 20 in total, constituting more than half of the seats up for election. Additionally, a number of Democratic and Republican gains occurred in states that typically favor the other party. For instance, Republican candidates won the usually Democratic states of Maryland, Hawaii, Minnesota, and Vermont; while Democratic governors were elected in Republican-leaning states like Wyoming, Tennessee, Oklahoma, and Kansas.

As of 2026, this election marks the most recent cycle in which Colorado or New York elected a Republican governor.

== Election ratings ==
State	Incumbent	Last race	Sabato November 4, 2002	Cook October 31, 2002	Result
Alabama	Don Siegelman	57.92% D	Lean R (flip)	Tossup	Riley; 49.17% R (flip)
Alaska	Tony Knowles (Term-limited)	51.27% D	Lean R (flip)	Tossup	Murkowski; 55.85% R (flip)
Arizona	Jane Dee Hull (Term-limited)	60.95% R	Lean D (flip)	Tossup	Napolitano; 46.19% D (flip)
Arkansas	Mike Huckabee	59.77% R	Lean R	Tossup	Huckabee; 53.02% R
California	Gray Davis	57.97% D	Likely D	Lean D	Davis; 47.26% D
Colorado	Bill Owens	49.04% R	Safe R	Safe R	Owens; 62.62% R
Connecticut	John G. Rowland	62.90% R	Likely R	Likely R	Rowland; 56.10% R
Florida	Jeb Bush	55.27% R	Leans R	Tossup	Bush; 56.01% R
Georgia	Roy Barnes	52.49% D	Likely D	Likely D	Perdue; 51.42% R (flip)
Hawaii	Ben Cayetano (Term-limited)	50.11% D	Lean R (flip)	Tossup	Lingle; 51.56% R (flip)
Idaho	Dirk Kempthorne	67.70% R	Lean R	Safe R	Kempthorne; 56.28% R
Illinois	George Ryan (Retired)	51.03% R	Safe D (flip)	Lean D (flip)	Blagojevich; 52.19% D (flip)
Iowa	Tom Vilsack	52.30% D	Leans D	Tossup	Vilsack; 52.69% D
Kansas	Bill Graves (term-limited)	73.37% R	Lean D (flip)	Lean D (flip)	Sebelius; 52.87% D (flip)
Maine	Angus King (term-limited)	58.61% I	Likely D (flip)	Lean D (flip)	Baldacci; 47.15% D (flip)
Maryland	Parris Glendening	55.14% D	Leans R (flip)	Tossup	Ehrlich; 51.55% R (flip)
Massachusetts	Jane Swift (Retired)	50.87% R	Leans D (flip)	Tossup	Romney; 49.18% R
Michigan	John Engler (term-limited)	62.20% R	Likely D (flip)	Lean D (flip)	Granholm; 51.42% D (flip)
Minnesota	Jesse Ventura (retired)	36.99% Re	Lean R (flip)	Tossup	Pawlenty; 44.37% R (flip)
Nebraska	Mike Johanns	53.90% R	Safe R	Safe R	Johanns; 68.68% R
Nevada	Kenny Guinn	51.63% R	Safe R	Safe R	Guinn; 68.24% R
New Hampshire	Jeanne Shaheen (retired)	48.74% D	Likely R (flip)	Lean R (flip)	Craig Benson; 58.62% R (flip)
New Mexico	Gary Johnson (term-limited)	54.53% R	Likely D (flip)	Likely D (flip)	Richardson; 55.49% D (flip)
New York	George Pataki	54.32% R	Likely R	Likely R	Pataki; 49.40% R
Ohio	Bob Taft	50.05% R	Likely R	Safe R	Taft; 57.76% R
Oklahoma	Frank Keating (term-limited)	57.86% R	Lean R	Likely R	Henry; 43.27% D (flip)
Oregon	John Kitzhaber (term-limited)	64.42% D	Lean D	Leans D	Kulongoski; 49.03% D
Pennsylvania	Mark Schweiker (retired)	57.42% R	Likely D (flip)	Lean D (flip)	Rendell; 53.41% D (flip)
Rhode Island	Lincoln Almond (term-limited)	50.97% R	Lean D (flip)	Tossup	Carcieri; 54.76% R
South Carolina	Jim Hodges	53.23% D	Lean R (flip)	Tossup	Sanford; 52.85% R (flip)
South Dakota	Bill Janklow (term-limited)	64.04% R	Likely R	Lean R	Rounds; 56.77% R
Tennessee	Don Sundquist (term-limited)	68.63% R	Lean D (flip)	Tossup	Bredesen; 50.65% D (flip)
Texas	Rick Perry	68.24% R	Likely R	Lean R	Perry; 57.81% R
Vermont	Howard Dean (retired)	50.45% D	Lean R (flip)	Tossup	Douglas; 44.94% R (flip)
Wisconsin	Scott McCallum	59.66% R	Lean D (flip)	Tossup	Doyle; 45.09% D (flip)
Wyoming	Jim Geringer (term-limited)	55.60% R	Lean R	Tossup	Freudenthal; 49.96% D (flip)

== Race Summary ==
=== States ===
State	Incumbent	Party	First elected	Result	Candidates
Alabama	Don Siegelman	Democratic	1998	Incumbent lost re-election. New governor elected. Republican gain.	✓ Bob R. Riley (Republican) 49.2%; Don Siegelman (Democratic) 49.0%; John Sophocleus (Libertarian) 1.7%
Alaska	Tony Knowles	Democratic	1994	Incumbent term-limited. New governor elected. Republican gain.	✓ Frank Murkowski (Republican) 55.9%; Fran Ulmer (Democratic) 40.7%; Diane E. Benson (Green) 1.3%
Arizona	Jane Dee Hull	Republican	1997 (Note: Hull took office after her predecessor (Fife Symington) resigned. She was subsequently elected in the 1998 Arizona gubernatorial election.)	Incumbent term-limited. New governor elected. Democratic gain.	✓ Janet Napolitano (Democratic) 46.2%; Matt Salmon (Republican) 45.2%; Richard D. Mahoney (Independent) 6.9%; Barry Hess (Libertarian) 1.7%
Arkansas	Mike Huckabee	Republican	1996 (Note: Huckabee took office after his predecessor (Jim Guy Tucker) resigned. He was subsequently elected in the 1998 Arkansas gubernatorial election.)	Incumbent re-elected.	✓ Mike Huckabee (Republican) 53.0%; Jimmie Lou Fisher (Democratic) 47.0%
California	Gray Davis	Democratic	1998	Incumbent re-elected.	✓ Gray Davis (Democratic) 47.3%; Bill Simon (Republican) 42.4%; Peter Camejo (Green) 5.3%; Gary Copeland (Libertarian) 2.2%; Reinhold Gulke (American Independent) 1.7%; Iris Adam (Natural Law) 1.2%
Colorado	Bill Owens	Republican	1998	Incumbent re-elected.	✓ Bill Owens (Republican) 62.6%; Rollie Heath (Democratic) 33.6%; Ronald Forthofer (Green) 2.3%; Ralph Shnelvar (Libertarian) 1.4%
Connecticut	John G. Rowland	Republican	1994	Incumbent re-elected.	✓ John G. Rowland (Republican) 56.1%; Bill Curry (Democratic) 43.9%
Florida	Jeb Bush	Republican	1998	Incumbent re-elected.	✓ Jeb Bush (Republican) 56.0%; Bill McBride (Democratic) 43.2%
Georgia	Roy Barnes	Democratic	1998	Incumbent lost re-election. New governor elected. Republican gain.	✓ Sonny Perdue (Republican) 51.4%; Roy Barnes (Democratic) 46.3%; Garrett Hayes (Libertarian) 2.3%
Hawaii	Ben Cayetano	Democratic	1994	Incumbent term-limited. New governor elected. Republican gain.	✓ Linda Lingle (Republican) 51.6%; Mazie Hirono (Democratic) 47.0%
Idaho	Dirk Kempthorne	Republican	1998	Incumbent re-elected.	✓ Dirk Kempthorne (Republican) 56.3%; Jerry Brady (Democratic) 41.7%; Daniel Adams (Libertarian) 2.0%
Illinois	George Ryan	Republican	1998	Incumbent retired. New governor elected. Democratic gain.	✓ Rod Blagojevich (Democratic) 52.2%; Jim Ryan (Republican) 45.1%; Calvin Skinner (Libertarian) 2.1%
Iowa	Tom Vilsack	Democratic	1998	Incumbent re-elected.	✓ Tom Vilsack (Democratic) 52.7%; Doug Gross (Republican) 44.5%; Jay Robinson (Green) 1.4%; Clyde Cleveland (Libertarian) 1.3%
Kansas	Bill Graves	Republican	1994	Incumbent term-limited. New governor elected. Democratic gain.	✓ Kathleen Sebelius (Democratic) 52.9%; Tim Shallenburger (Republican) 45.1%; Theodore Pettibone (Reform) 1.1%; Dennis Hawver (Libertarian) 1.0%
Maine	Angus King	Independent	1994	Incumbent term-limited. New governor elected. Democratic gain.	✓ John Baldacci (Democratic) 47.1%; Peter Cianchette (Republican) 41.5%; Jonathan Carter (Green) 9.3%; John Michael (Independent) 2.1%
Maryland	Parris Glendening	Democratic	1994	Incumbent term-limited. New governor elected. Republican gain.	✓ Bob Ehrlich (Republican) 51.5%; Kathleen K. Townsend (Democratic) 47.7%
Massachusetts	Jane Swift	Republican	2001 (Note: Swift took office after her predecessor (Paul Cellucci) resigned.)	Incumbent retired. New governor elected. Republican hold.	✓ Mitt Romney (Republican) 49.8%; Shannon O'Brien (Democratic) 44.9%; Jill Stein (Green-Rainbow) 3.5%; Carla Howell (Libertarian) 1.1%
Michigan	John Engler	Republican	1990	Incumbent term-limited. New governor elected. Democratic gain.	✓ Jennifer Granholm (Democratic) 51.4%; Dick Posthumus (Republican) 47.4%
Minnesota	Jesse Ventura	Independence (Note: The Minnesota Independence Party was known as the Reform Party of Minnesota until 2000.)	1998	Incumbent retired. New governor elected. Republican gain.	✓ Tim Pawlenty (Republican) 44.4%; Roger Moe (Democratic) 36.5%; Tim Penny (Independence) 16.2%; Ken Pentel (Green) 2.3%
Nebraska	Mike Johanns	Republican	1998	Incumbent re-elected.	✓ Mike Johanns (Republican) 68.7%; Stormy Dean (Democratic) 27.5%; Paul A. Rosberg (Nebraska) 3.8%
Nevada	Kenny Guinn	Republican	1998	Incumbent re-elected.	✓ Kenny Guinn (Republican) 68.2%; Joe Neal (Democratic) 22.0%; Dick Geyer (Libertarian) 1.6%; David G. Holmgren (Independent American) 1.4%; Jerry L. Norton (Independent) 1.1%
New Hampshire	Jeanne Shaheen	Democratic	1996	Incumbent retired to run for U.S. Senator. New governor elected. Republican gain.	✓ Craig Benson (Republican) 58.6%; Mark Fernald (Democratic) 38.2%; John Babiarz (Libertarian) 2.9%
New Mexico	Gary Johnson	Republican	1994	Incumbent term-limited. New governor elected. Democratic gain.	✓ Bill Richardson (Democratic) 55.5%; John Sanchez (Republican) 39.0%; David Bacon (Green) 5.5%
New York	George Pataki	Republican	1994	Incumbent re-elected.	✓ George Pataki (Republican) 49.4%; Carl McCall (Democratic) 33.5%; Tom Golisano (Independence) 14.3%; Gerald Cronin (Right to Life) 1.0%
Ohio	Bob Taft	Republican	1998	Incumbent re-elected.	✓ Bob Taft (Republican) 57.8%; Tim Hagan (Democratic) 38.3%; John Eastman (Independent) 3.9%
Oklahoma	Frank Keating	Republican	1994	Incumbent term-limited. New governor elected. Democratic gain.	✓ Brad Henry (Democratic) 43.3%; Steve Largent (Republican) 42.6%; Gary Richardson (Independent) 14.1%
Oregon	John Kitzhaber	Democratic	1994	Incumbent term-limited. New governor elected. Democratic hold.	✓ Ted Kulongoski (Democratic) 49.0%; Kevin Mannix (Republican) 46.2%; Tom Cox (Libertarian) 4.6%
Pennsylvania	Mark Schweiker	Republican	2001 (Note: Schweiker took office after his predecessor (Tom Ridge) resigned.)	Incumbent retired. New governor elected. Democratic gain.	✓ Ed Rendell (Democratic) 53.4%; Mike Fisher (Republican) 44.4%; Ken Krawchuk (Libertarian) 1.1%; Mike Morrill (Green) 1.1%
Rhode Island	Lincoln Almond	Republican	1994	Incumbent term-limited. New governor elected. Republican hold.	✓ Donald Carcieri (Republican) 54.8%; Myrth York (Democratic) 45.2%
South Carolina	Jim Hodges	Democratic	1998	Incumbent lost re-election. New governor elected. Republican gain.	✓ Mark Sanford (Republican) 52.9%; Jim Hodges (Democratic) 47.0%
South Dakota	Bill Janklow	Republican	1978; 1986 (term-limited); 1994	Incumbent term-limited. New governor elected. Republican hold.	✓ Mike Rounds (Republican) 56.8%; Jim Abbott (Democratic) 41.9%
Tennessee	Don Sundquist	Republican	1994	Incumbent term-limited. New governor elected. Democratic gain.	✓ Phil Bredesen (Democratic) 50.6%; Van Hilleary (Republican) 47.6%
Texas	Rick Perry	Republican	2000 (Note: Perry took office after his predecessor (George W. Bush) resigned to become President of the United States.)	Incumbent elected to full term.	✓ Rick Perry (Republican) 57.8%; Tony Sanchez (Democratic) 40.0%; Jeff Daiell (Libertarian) 1.5%
Vermont	Howard Dean	Democratic	1991 (Note: Dean took office after his predecessor (Richard Snelling) died. He was subsequently elected in the 1992 Vermont gubernatorial election.)	Incumbent retired. New governor elected. Republican gain.	✓ Jim Douglas (Republican) 44.9%; Doug Racine (Democratic) 42.4%; Cornelius Hogan (Independent) 9.7%
Wisconsin	Scott McCallum	Republican	2001 (Note: McCallum took office after his predecessor (Tommy Thompson) resigned.)	Incumbent lost election to full term. New governor elected. Democratic gain.	✓ Jim Doyle (Democratic) 45.1%; Scott McCallum (Republican) 41.4%; Ed Thompson (Libertarian) 10.4%; Jim Young (Green) 2.5%
Wyoming	Jim Geringer	Republican	1994	Incumbent term-limited. New governor elected. Democratic gain.	✓ Dave Freudenthal (Democratic) 50.0%; Eli Bebout (Republican) 47.9%; Dave Dawson (Libertarian) 2.1%

=== Territories and federal district ===
Territory	Incumbent	Party	First elected	Result	Candidates
District of Columbia	Anthony A. Williams	Democratic	1998	Incumbent re-elected.	✓ Anthony A. Williams (Democratic) 60.6%; Carol Schwartz (Republican) 34.5%; Steve Donkin (Statehood Green) 2.5%
Guam	Carl Gutierrez	Democratic	1994	Incumbent lost renomination. New governor elected. Republican gain.	✓ Felix P. Camacho (Republican) 55.4%; Robert A. Underwood (Democratic) 44.6%
U.S. Virgin Islands	Charles Turnbull	Democratic	1998	Incumbent re-elected.	✓ Charles W. Turnbull (Democratic) 50.1%; John P. de Jongh (Independent) 24.6%; Alicia Hansen (Independent) 7.8%; Michael Bornn (Republican) 7.2%; Gerard Luz James II (Independent) 5.1%; Cora Christian (Independent) 3.1%; Lloyd L. Williams (Independent) 1.5%

== Closest races ==
States where the margin of victory was under 1%:

1. Alabama, 0.2%
2. Oklahoma, 0.7%

States where the margin of victory was under 5%:

1. Arizona, 1.0%
2. Wyoming, 2.0%
3. Vermont, 2.5%
4. Oregon, 2.9%
5. Tennessee, 3.1%
6. Wisconsin, 3.7%
7. Maryland, 3.9%
8. Michigan, 4.0%
9. Hawaii, 4.6%
10. Massachusetts, 4.8%
11. California, 4.9%

States where the margin of victory was under 10%:

1. Georgia, 5.2%
2. Maine, 5.7%
3. South Carolina, 5.9%
4. Arkansas, 6.1%
5. Illinois, 7.1%
6. Kansas, 7.8%
7. Minnesota, 7.9%
8. Iowa, 8.2%
9. Pennsylvania, 9.0%
10. Rhode Island, 9.5%

== Alabama ==
2002 Alabama gubernatorial election
- November 5, 2002
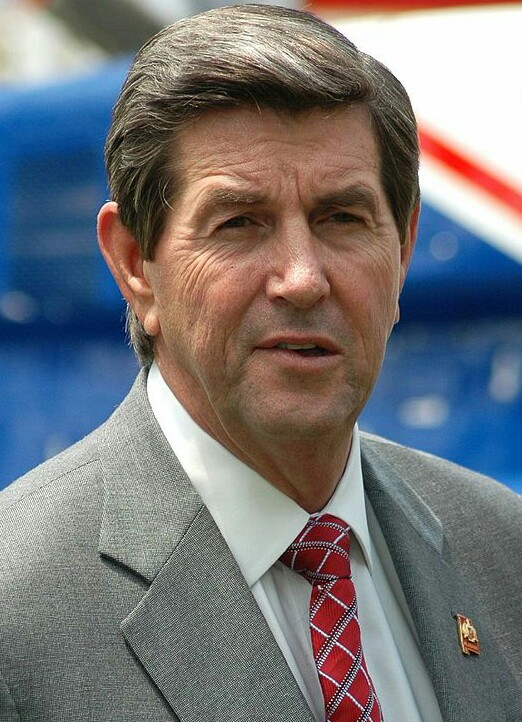

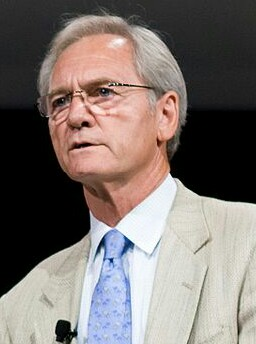
Nominee	Bob Riley	Don Siegelman
Party	Republican	Democratic
Popular vote	672,225	669,105
Percentage	49.2%	48.9%
- Riley: 40–50% 50–60% 60–70% Siegelman: 40–50% 50–60% 60–70% 70–80% 80–90%
Governor before election
Don Siegelman
Democratic
Elected Governor
Bob Riley
Republican

The 2002 Alabama gubernatorial election was held on November 5. The race pitted incumbent governor Don Siegelman, a Democrat, against Representative Bob Riley, a Republican, and Libertarian nominee John Sophocleus. As of 2023, this is the last time the Governor’s office in Alabama changed partisan control.

The result was an extremely narrow victory for Riley. The certified results showed Riley with 672,225 votes to Siegelman's 669,105, a difference of 3,120 votes, or 0.23% of the 1,367,053 votes cast. Sophocleus garnered 23,272 votes, and 2,451 votes were for write-in candidates. The close and controversial election was marked by high turnout.

== Alaska ==
2002 Alaska gubernatorial election
- November 5, 2002
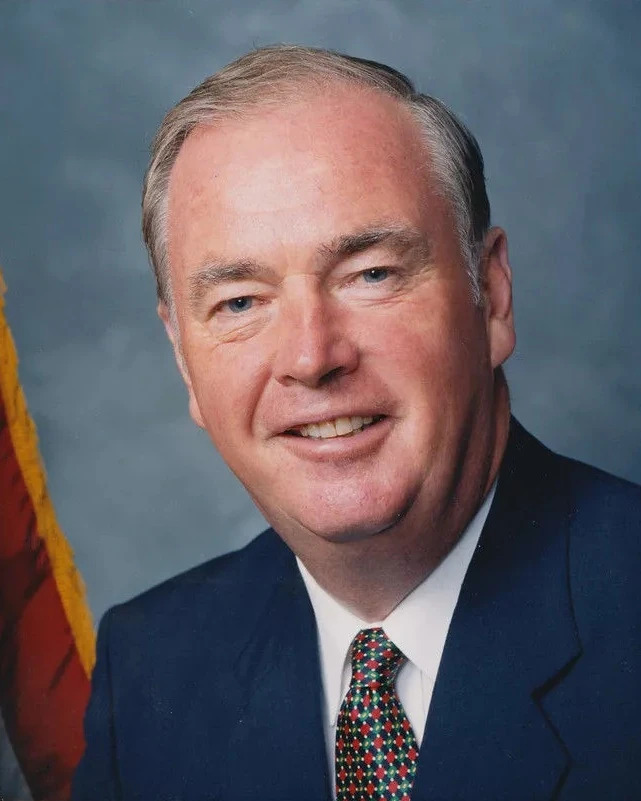

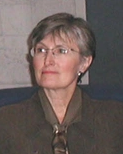
Nominee	Frank Murkowski	Fran Ulmer
Party	Republican	Democratic
Running mate	Loren Leman	Ernie Hall
Popular vote	129,279	94,216
Percentage	55.8%	40.7%
- Results by state house district Murkowski: 40–50% 50–60% 60–70% 70–80% Ulmer: 40–50% 50–60% 60–70% 70–80%
Governor before election
Tony Knowles
Democratic
Elected Governor
Frank Murkowski
Republican

The 2002 Alaska gubernatorial election took place on November 5, 2002, for the post of Governor of Alaska. Republican U.S. Senator Frank Murkowski defeated Democratic Lieutenant Governor Fran Ulmer. Murkowski became the first Republican elected governor of Alaska since Jay Hammond in 1978.

== Arizona ==
2002 Arizona gubernatorial election
- November 5, 2002
- Turnout: 56.33%
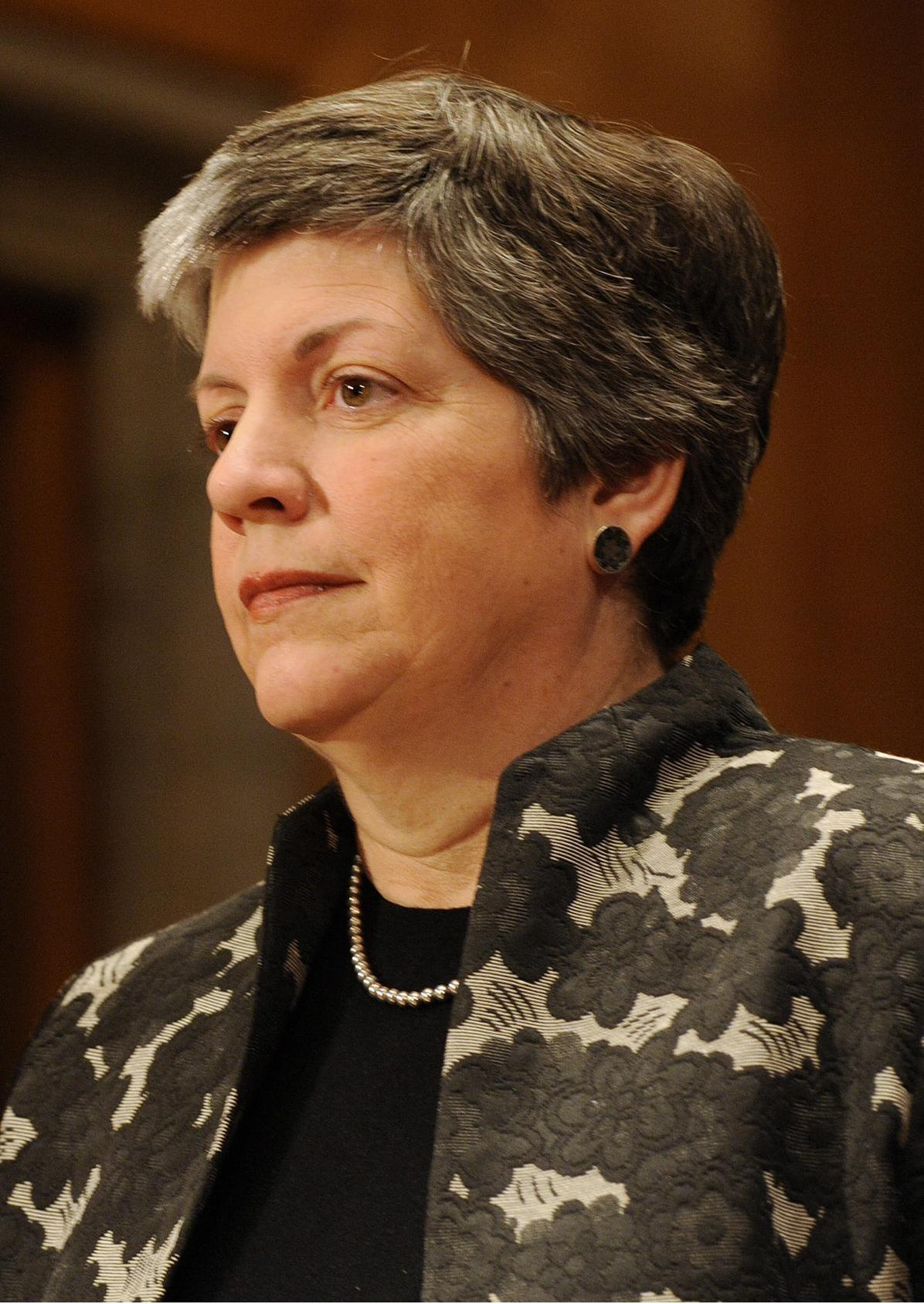

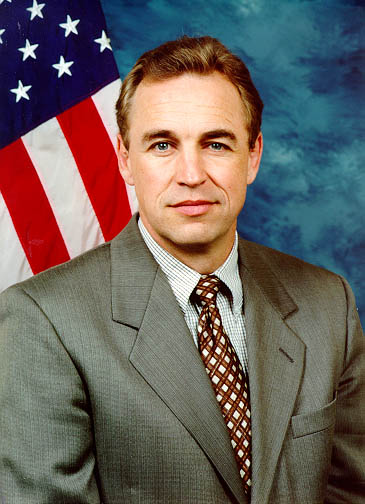

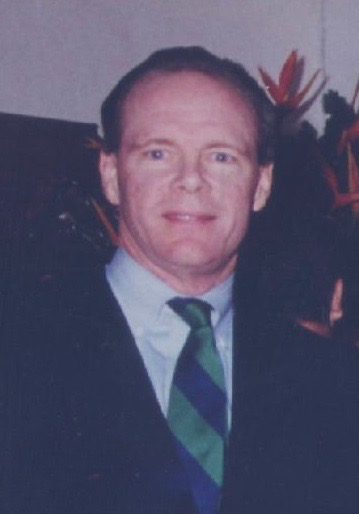
Nominee	Janet Napolitano	Matt Salmon	Richard Mahoney
Party	Democratic	Republican	Independent
Popular vote	566,284	554,465	84,947
Percentage	46.2%	45.2%	6.9%
- County results Napolitano: 40–50% 50–60% 60–70% Salmon: 40–50% 50–60%
Governor before election
Jane Dee Hull
Republican
Elected Governor
Janet Napolitano
Democratic

The 2002 Arizona gubernatorial election took place on November 5, 2002. Incumbent Republican governor Jane Dee Hull was term-limited. The Democratic nominee, Arizona Attorney General Janet Napolitano, narrowly defeated Republican Matt Salmon, a former U.S. Representative. Upon her inauguration, Napolitano became the first woman to succeed another woman as Governor of a state. Until 2022, this was the last gubernatorial election in Arizona in which the margin of victory was single digits.

== Arkansas ==
2002 Arkansas gubernatorial election
- November 5, 2002
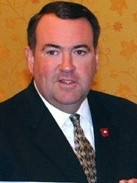

Nominee	Mike Huckabee	Jimmie Lou Fisher
Party	Republican	Democratic
Popular vote	427,082	378,250
Percentage	53.01%	46.95%
- County results Huckabee: 50–60% 60–70% Fisher: 50–60% 60–70%
Governor before election
Mike Huckabee
Republican
Elected Governor
Mike Huckabee
Republican

The 2002 Arkansas gubernatorial election took place on November 5, 2002 for the post of Governor of Arkansas. Incumbent Republican governor Mike Huckabee defeated Democratic State Treasurer Jimmie Lou Fisher.

== California ==
2002 California gubernatorial election
- November 5, 2002
- Turnout: 36.05% ▼5.38pp
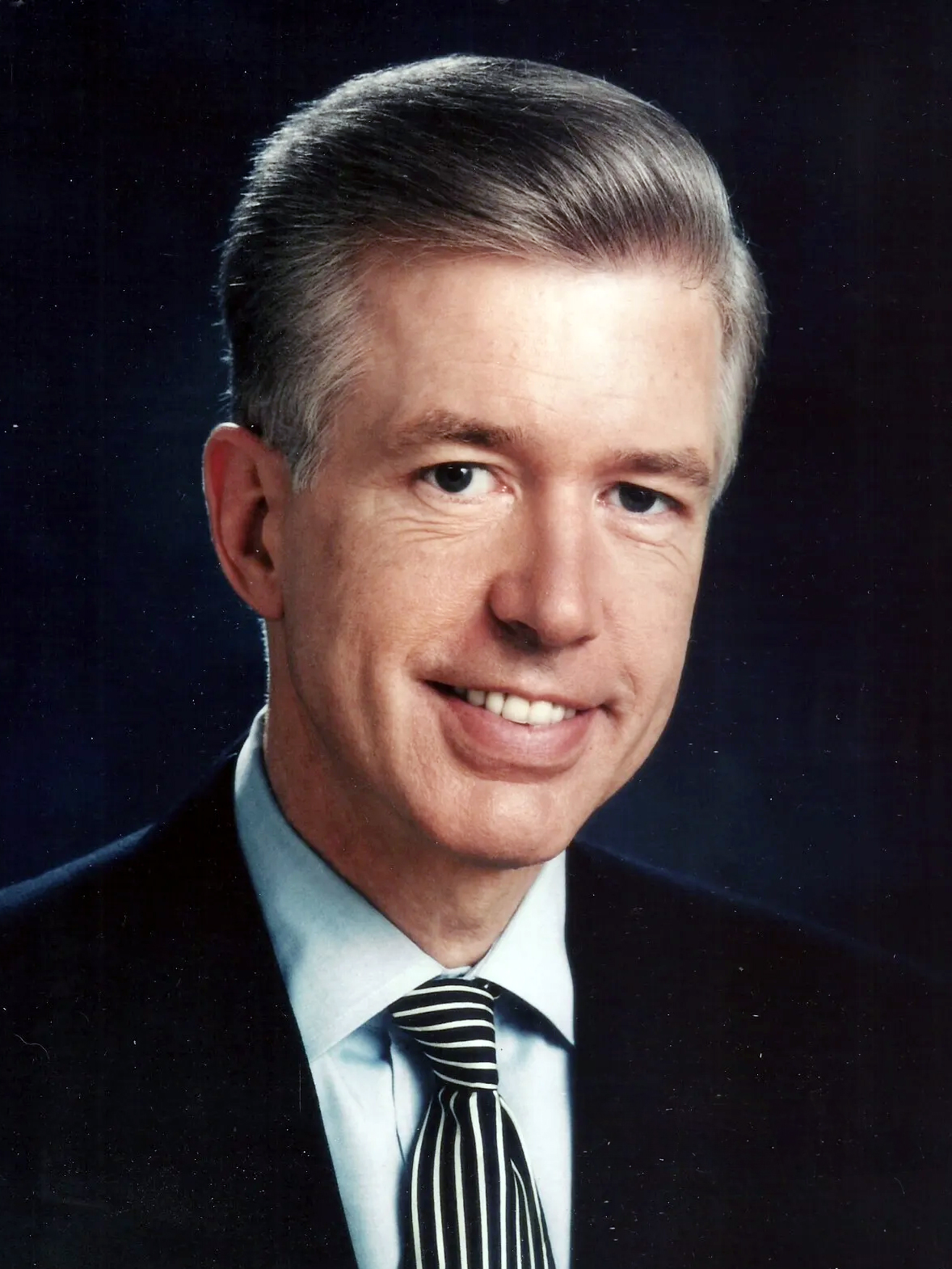

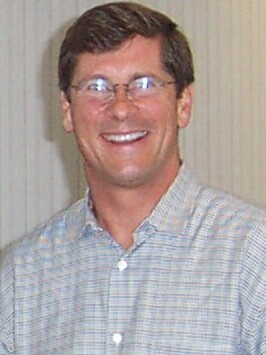

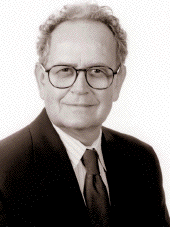
Nominee	Gray Davis	Bill Simon	Peter Camejo
Party	Democratic	Republican	Green
Popular vote	3,533,490	3,169,801	393,036
Percentage	47.3%	42.4%	5.3%
- County results Davis: 40–50% 50–60% 60–70% Simon: 40–50% 50–60% 60–70%
Governor before election
Gray Davis
Democratic
Elected Governor
Gray Davis
Democratic

The 2002 California gubernatorial election was an election that occurred on November 5, 2002. Democrat Gray Davis defeated Republican Bill Simon by 5% and was re-elected to a second four-year term as Governor of California. Davis would be recalled less than a year into his next term.

The 2002 gubernatorial primary occurred in March 2002. Gray Davis faced no major competitor in the primary and won the nomination. Simon defeated former Los Angeles Mayor Richard Riordan in the Republican primary. Gray Davis ran a series of negative ads against Riordan in the primary. Riordan was seen as a moderate and early state polls showed him defeating Gray Davis in the general election.

== Colorado ==
2002 Colorado gubernatorial election
- November 5, 2002
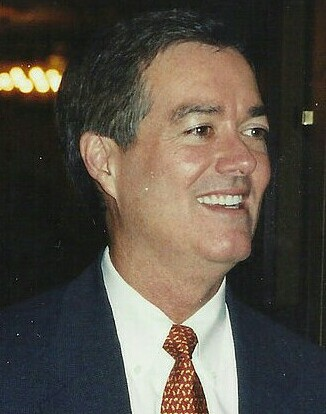

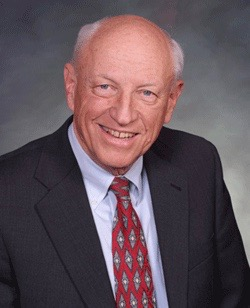
Nominee	Bill Owens	Rollie Heath
Party	Republican	Democratic
Running mate	Jane Norton	Bill Thiebaut
Popular vote	884,583	475,373
Percentage	62.62%	33.65%
- County results Owens: 40–50% 50–60% 60–70% 70–80% 80–90% Heath: 40–50% 50–60%
Governor before election
Bill Owens
Republican
Elected Governor
Bill Owens
Republican

The 2002 Colorado gubernatorial election was held on November 5, 2002 to elect the governor of Colorado. Bill Owens, the Republican incumbent, defeated Democratic nominee Rollie Heath to win a second term. Owen's win set the record for biggest win by a Republican in a Colorado gubernatorial election (Democrats won by larger margins in 1982, 1948, and 1928, with Billy Adams' 35 point blowout in that year being the greatest victory for a candidate of any party). As of 2026, this is the last time a Republican was elected Governor of Colorado.

== Connecticut ==
2002 Connecticut gubernatorial election
- November 5, 2002
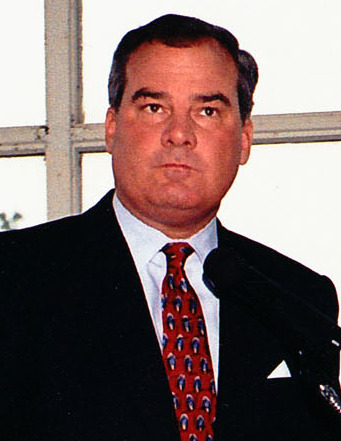
Nominee	John G. Rowland	Bill Curry
Party	Republican	Democratic
Running mate	Jodi Rell	George Jepsen
Popular vote	573,958	448,984
Percentage	56.1%	43.9%
- Rowland: 50–60% 60–70% 70–80% Curry: 50–60% 60–70% 70–80%
Governor before election
John G. Rowland
Republican
Elected Governor
John G. Rowland
Republican

The 2002 Connecticut gubernatorial election took place on November 5, 2002. Incumbent Republican governor John G. Rowland won reelection to a third consecutive term, defeating Democrat Bill Curry. Rowland became the first Connecticut Governor to win a third term in office, but did not finish his term, resigning in 2004 due to allegations of corruption. Despite losing this election, as of 2022, Curry is the last Democratic gubernatorial candidate to carry Windham County.

== Florida ==
2002 Florida gubernatorial election
- November 5, 2002
- Turnout: 55.3%▲5.8
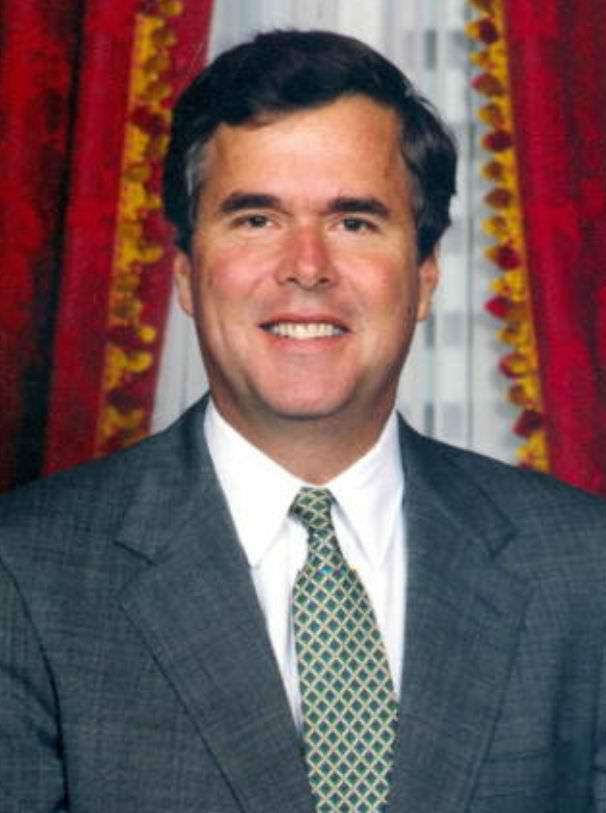

Nominee	Jeb Bush	Bill McBride
Party	Republican	Democratic
Running mate	Frank Brogan	Tom Rossin
Popular vote	2,856,845	2,201,427
Percentage	56.0%	43.2%
- County results Bush: 50–60% 60–70% 70–80% McBride: 50–60% 60–70% 70–80%
Governor before election
Jeb Bush
Republican
Elected Governor
Jeb Bush
Republican

The 2002 Florida gubernatorial election took place on November 5, 2002 for the post of Governor of Florida. Incumbent Republican governor Jeb Bush defeated Democratic candidate Bill McBride. Bush became the first Republican governor of Florida to win re-election to a second term. This election was the last time until 2022 a Florida gubernatorial candidate won the general election by double digits or that a Republican won Miami-Dade County. This was the first time in Florida's history that a Republican Governor was re-elected.

== Georgia ==
2002 Georgia gubernatorial election
- November 5, 2002
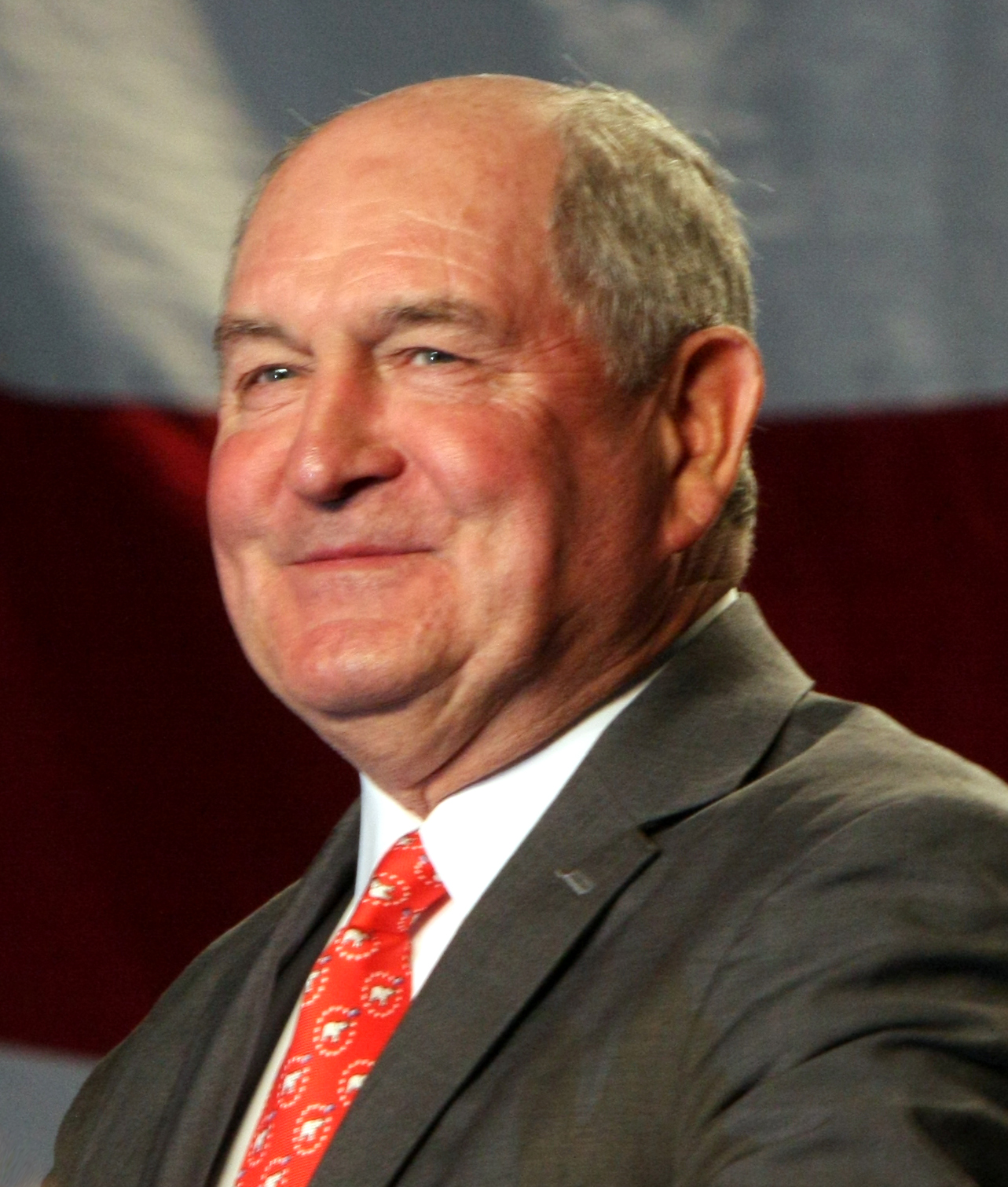

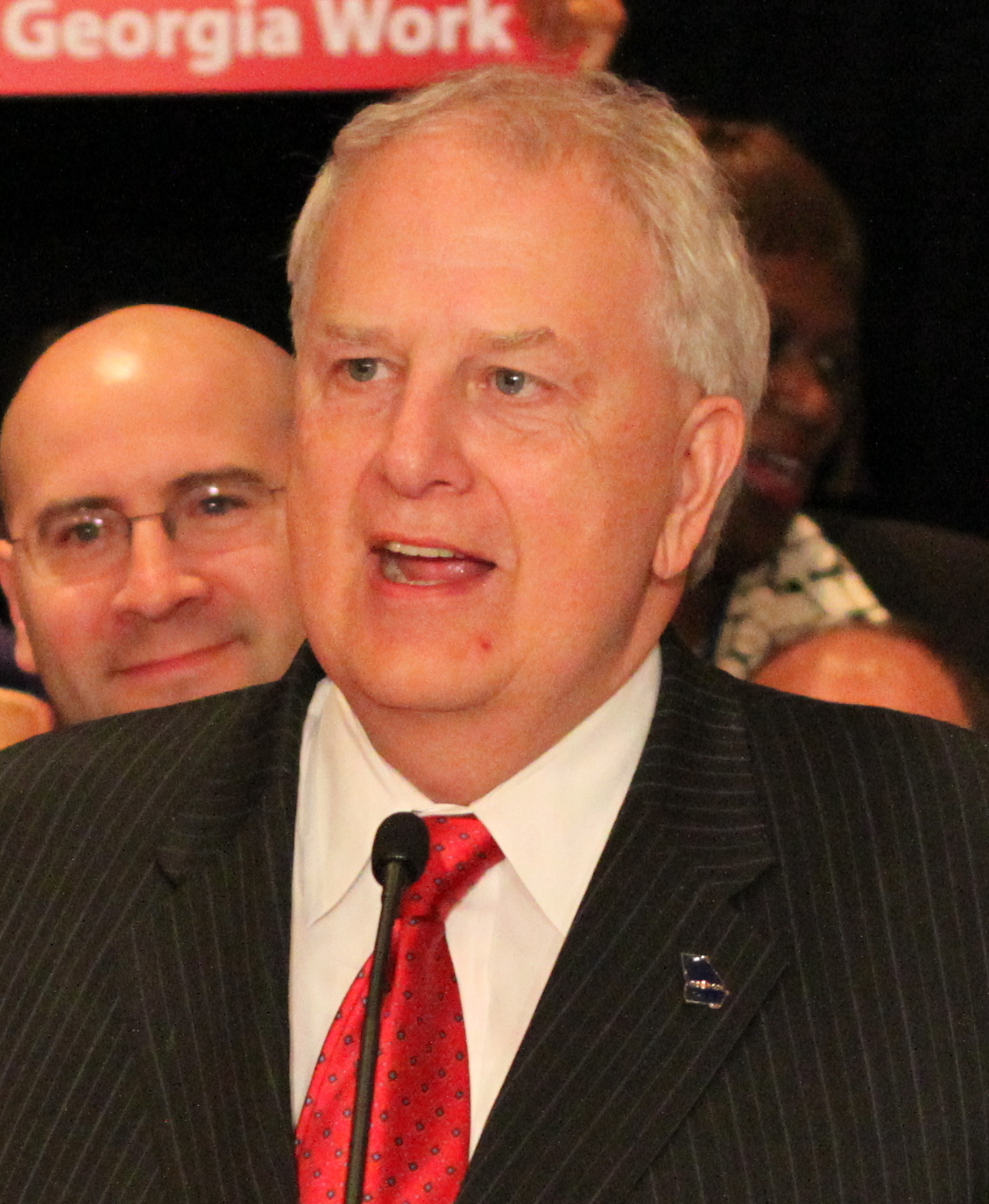
Nominee	Sonny Perdue	Roy Barnes
Party	Republican	Democratic
Popular vote	1,041,677	937,062
Percentage	51.39%	46.23%
- County results Perdue: 40–50% 50–60% 60–70% 70–80% Barnes: 40–50% 50–60% 60–70% 70–80% Tie: 40–50%
Governor before election
Roy Barnes
Democratic
Elected Governor
Sonny Perdue
Republican

The 2002 Georgia gubernatorial election was held on November 5, 2002. Incumbent Democratic governor Roy Barnes sought re-election to a second term as governor. State Senator Sonny Perdue emerged as the Republican nominee from a crowded and hotly contested primary, and he faced off against Barnes, who had faced no opponents in his primary election, in the general election. Though Barnes had been nicknamed "King Roy" due to his unique ability to get his legislative priorities passed, he faced a backlash among Georgia voters due to his proposal to change the state flag from its Confederate design.

Ultimately, Perdue was able to defeat incumbent governor Barnes and became the first Republican to serve as governor of the state since Reconstruction. This was only the second election that a Republican won in the state's history, the other being in 1868. The result was widely considered a major upset.

== Hawaii ==
2002 Hawaii gubernatorial election
- November 5, 2002
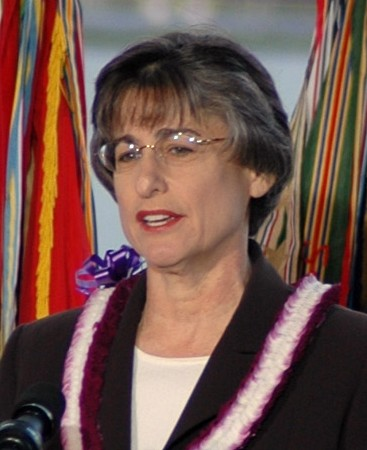

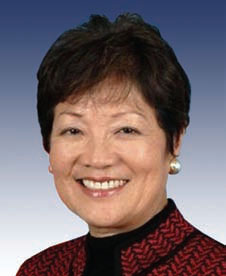
Nominee	Linda Lingle	Mazie Hirono
Party	Republican	Democratic
Running mate	Duke Aiona	Matt Matsunaga
Popular vote	197,009	179,647
Percentage	51.6%	47.0%
- County results Lingle: 50–60% Hirono: 50–60%
Governor before election
Ben Cayetano
Democratic
Elected Governor
Linda Lingle
Republican

The 2002 Hawaii gubernatorial election was held on November 5, 2002, to select the governor of Hawaii. Incumbent Democratic Governor of Hawaii Ben Cayetano was term-limited and therefore could not run for re-election. Former Maui Mayor Linda Lingle, who had narrowly lost the 1998 election, was nominated once again by the Republicans while Lieutenant Governor Mazie Hirono earned the Democratic nomination in a tight race. Lingle and Hirono duked it out in a hard-fought campaign, with Hirono's campaign crippled by allegations of corruption within the Hawaii Democratic Party and many voters desiring a change.

Ultimately Lingle defeated Hirono in a close election, making her the first Republican governor of Hawaii elected since 1959 and the state's first-ever female governor. She was the first white governor of the state since 1970. Lingle and Hirono faced off again in Hawaii’s 2012 U.S. Senate election, where Hirono won 63% - 37%, making Lingle the first female governor and Hirono the first female U.S. senator in Hawaii history.

== Idaho ==
2002 Idaho gubernatorial election
- November 5, 2002
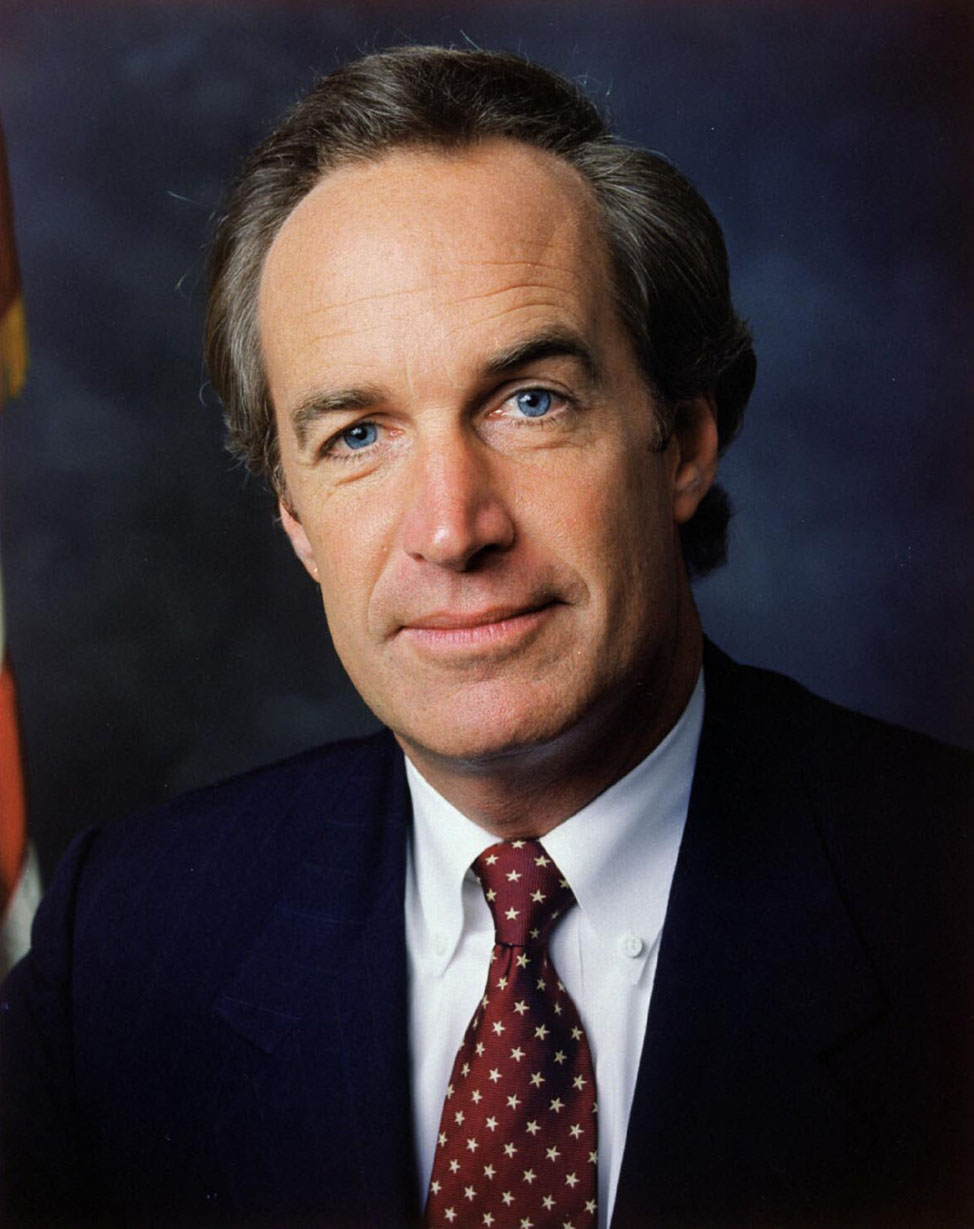

Nominee	Dirk Kempthorne	Jerry Brady
Party	Republican	Democratic
Popular vote	231,566	171,711
Percentage	56.3%	41.7%
- County results Kempthorne: 50–60% 60–70% 70–80% Brady: 40–50% 50–60%
Governor before election
Dirk Kempthorne
Republican
Elected Governor
Dirk Kempthorne
Republican

The 2002 Idaho gubernatorial election was held on November 5, 2002 to select the governor of the state of Idaho. Dirk Kempthorne, the Republican incumbent, defeated Democratic nominee Jerry Brady to win a second term, but the win was not nearly as overwhelming as Kempthorne's 1998 victory. This was the first Idaho gubernatorial election since 1978 in which the winner was of the same party as the incumbent president.

== Illinois ==
2002 Illinois gubernatorial election
- November 5, 2002
- Turnout: 50.05% ▲0.33 pp
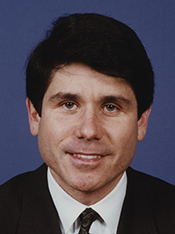

Nominee	Rod Blagojevich	Jim Ryan
Party	Democratic	Republican
Running mate	Pat Quinn	Carl Hawkinson
Popular vote	1,847,040	1,594,961
Percentage	52.2%	45.1%
- County results Blagojevich: 40–50% 50–60% 60–70% Ryan: 40–50% 50–60% 60–70% 70–80%
Governor before election
George Ryan
Republican
Elected Governor
Rod Blagojevich
Democratic

The 2002 Illinois gubernatorial election occurred on November 5, 2002. Incumbent Republican governor George Ryan, who was plagued by scandal, did not run for a second term. Democrat Rod Blagojevich, a U.S. Congressman, ran against Republican Jim Ryan (no relation to the incumbent), the Illinois Attorney General. Blagojevich won 52% to 45%, becoming the first Democrat to win an election for governor since 1972. As of 2023 this is the last Illinois governor election where no candidate running was an incumbent.

== Iowa ==
2002 Iowa gubernatorial election
- November 5, 2002
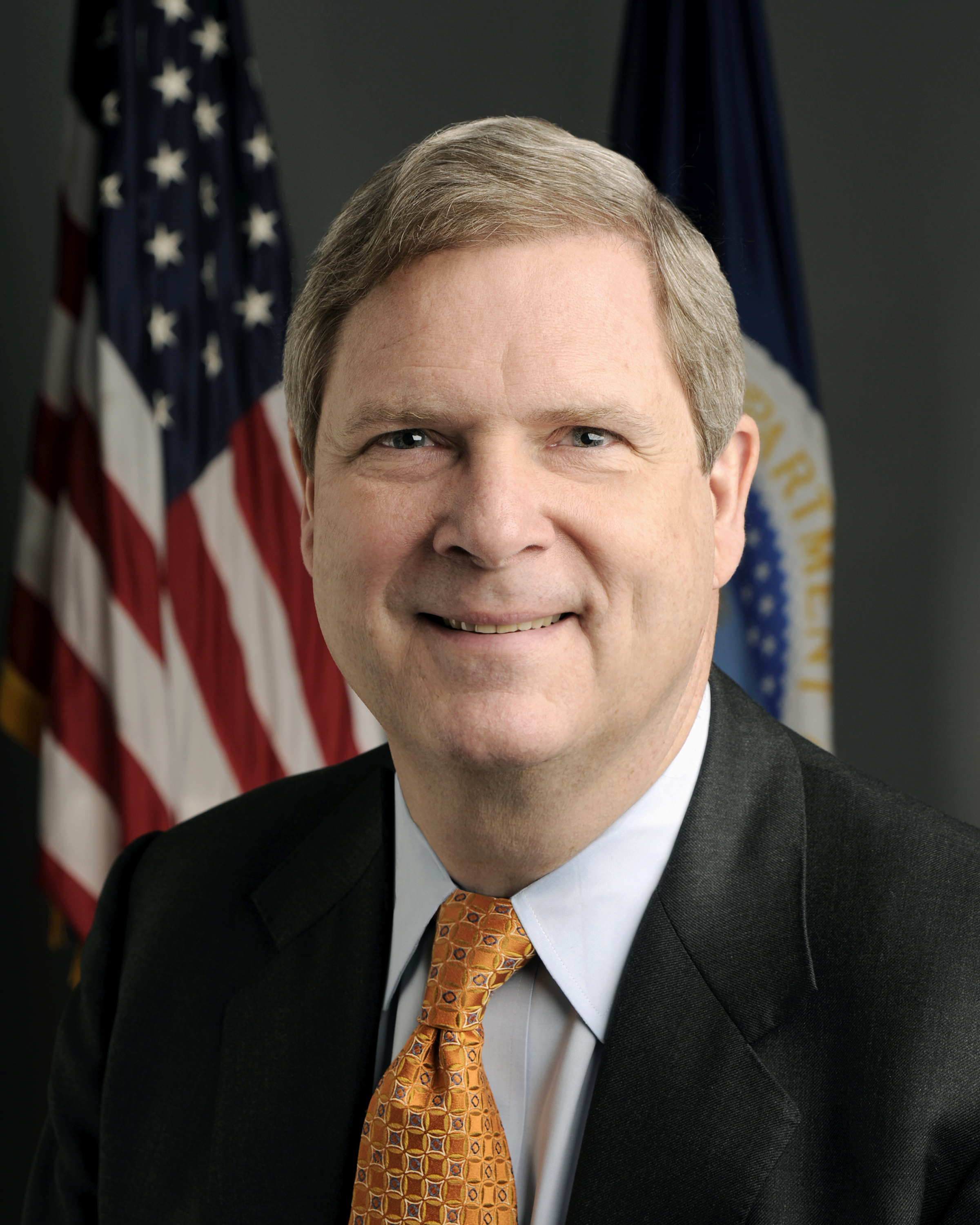

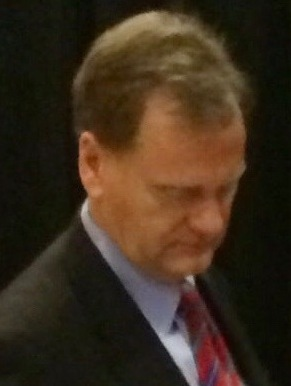
Nominee	Tom Vilsack	Doug Gross
Party	Democratic	Republican
Popular vote	540,449	456,612
Percentage	52.7%	44.5%
- County results Vilsack: 40–50% 50–60% 60–70% Gross: 40–50% 50–60% 60–70% 70-80% 80–90%
Governor before election
Tom Vilsack
Democratic
Elected Governor
Tom Vilsack
Democratic

The 2002 Iowa gubernatorial election took place November 5, 2002. Incumbent Democratic Governor of Iowa Tom Vilsack sought re-election to a second term as governor. Governor Vilsack won his party's nomination uncontested, while Doug Gross, an advisor to former governor Terry Branstad, narrowly won the Republican Party's primary in a crowded and competitive primary election. In the general election, Vilsack was able to improve slightly on his margin of victory four years earlier to win what would be his second and final term as governor.

== Kansas ==
2002 Kansas gubernatorial election
- November 5, 2002
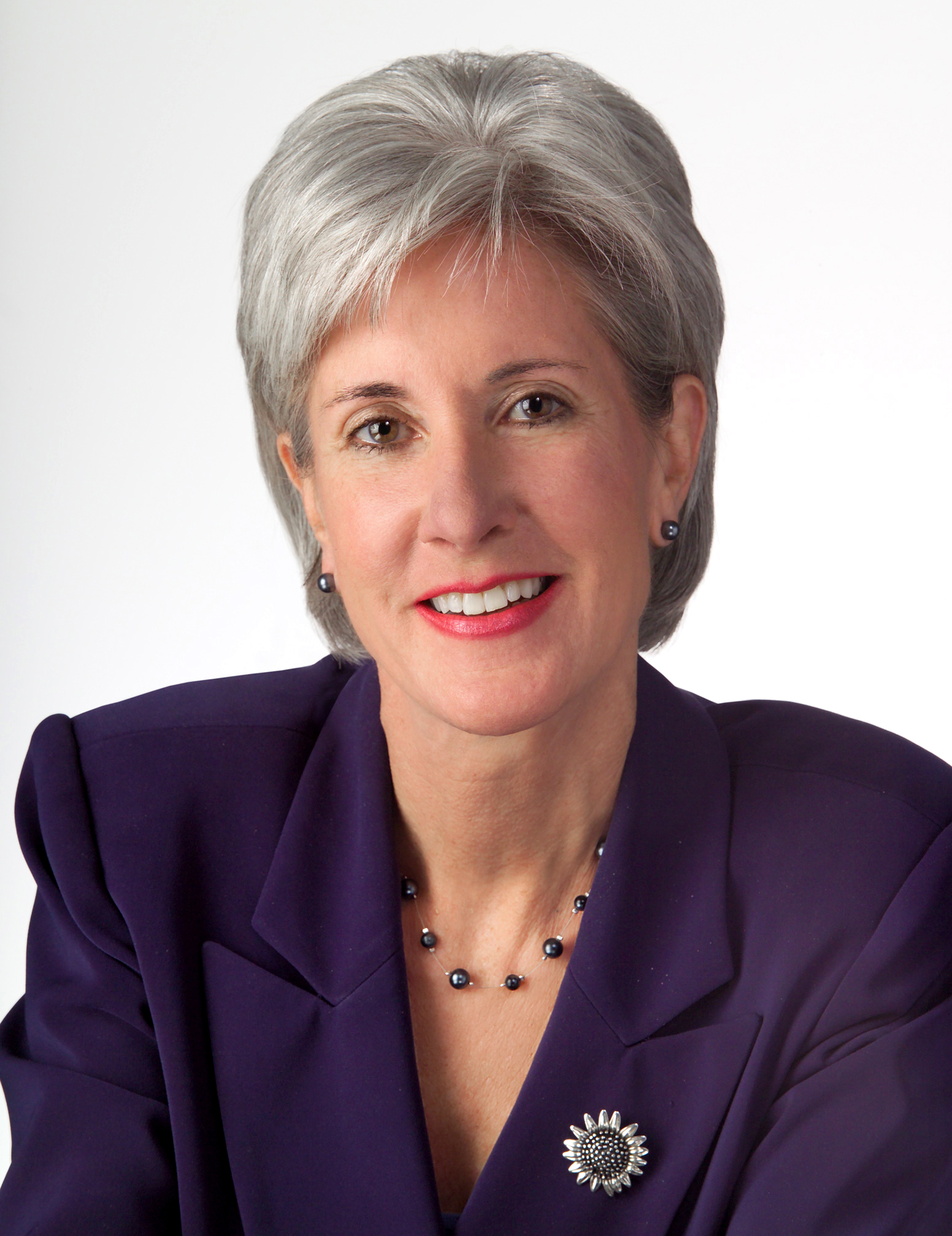

Nominee	Kathleen Sebelius	Tim Shallenburger
Party	Democratic	Republican
Running mate	John E. Moore	Dave Lindstrom
Popular vote	441,858	376,830
Percentage	52.9%	45.1%
- County results Sebelius: 40–50% 50–60% 60–70% 70–80% Shallenburger: 40–50% 50–60% 60–70% Tie: 40–50%
Governor before election
Bill Graves
Republican
Elected Governor
Kathleen Sebelius
Democratic

The 2002 Kansas gubernatorial election was held on November 5, 2002. Incumbent governor Bill Graves, a Republican, was barred from seeking a third term by the Kansas Constitution. Kansas Insurance Commissioner Kathleen Sebelius, the Democratic nominee, ran against Kansas State Treasurer Tim Shallenburger, the Republican nominee, with Sebelius defeating Shallenburger to become the second female Governor of Kansas after Joan Finney who served as governor from 1991 to 1995.

== Maine ==
2002 Maine gubernatorial election
- November 5, 2002
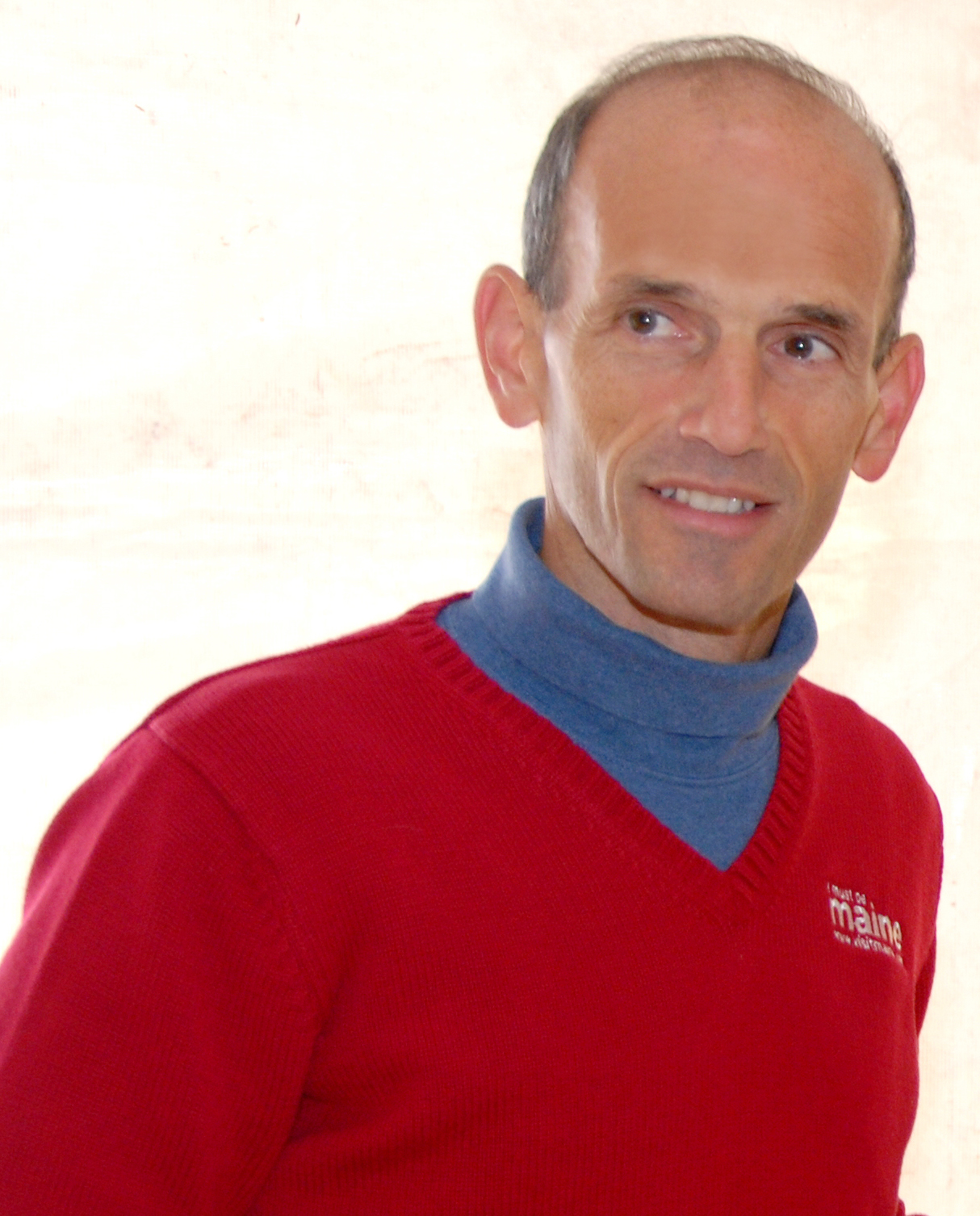

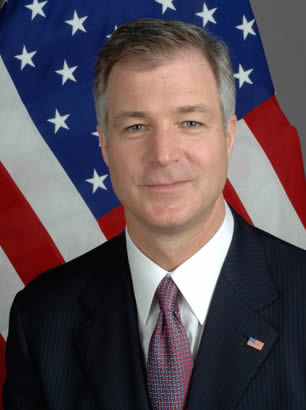

Nominee	John Baldacci	Peter Cianchette	Jonathan Carter
Party	Democratic	Republican	Green
Popular vote	238,179	209,496	46,903
Percentage	47.15%	41.47%	9.28%
- Baldacci: 30–40% 40–50% 50–60% 60–70% 70–80% 80–90% >90%} Cianchette: 40–50% 50–60% 60–70% 70–80% 80–90% Carter: 50-60% Tie: 40-50% 50%
Governor before election
Angus King
Independent
Elected Governor
John Baldacci
Democratic

The 2002 Maine gubernatorial election took place on November 5, 2002. Incumbent Independent Governor Angus King was term limited, and unable to seek re-election. U.S. Congressman John Baldacci won the Democratic primary uncontested, while former State Representative Peter Cianchette emerged from the Republican primary victorious. Baldacci and Cianchetti squared off in the general election, along with Green Party nominee Jonathan Carter and independent State Representative John Michael.

Ultimately, Baldacci prevailed to win what would be his first of two terms as governor. John Baldacci's win marked the first Democratic gubernatorial victory in the state since 1982.

== Maryland ==
2002 Maryland gubernatorial election
- November 5, 2002
- Turnout: 61.85% ▲1.26%
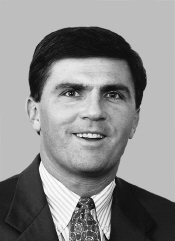

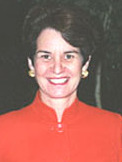
Nominee	Bob Ehrlich	Kathleen Kennedy Townsend
Party	Republican	Democratic
Running mate	Michael Steele	Charles R. Larson
Popular vote	879,592	813,422
Percentage	51.6%	47.7%
- County results Ehrlich: 50–60% 60–70% 70–80% Townsend: 60–70% 70–80%
Governor before election
Parris Glendening
Democratic
Elected Governor
Bob Ehrlich
Republican

The 2002 Maryland gubernatorial election was held on November 5, 2002. Democratic Governor Parris Glendening was term-limited and could not seek a third term. Republican Bob Ehrlich defeated Democrat Kathleen Kennedy Townsend, making him the first Republican governor of Maryland since Spiro Agnew, who served from 1967 to 1969. This was the last time Charles County voted Republican for any office.

This election marked the first time since the 1934 gubernatorial election that a Republican won Maryland without Baltimore City or Montgomery County.

== Massachusetts ==
2002 Massachusetts gubernatorial election
- November 5, 2002
- Turnout: 55.29% ▲4.1
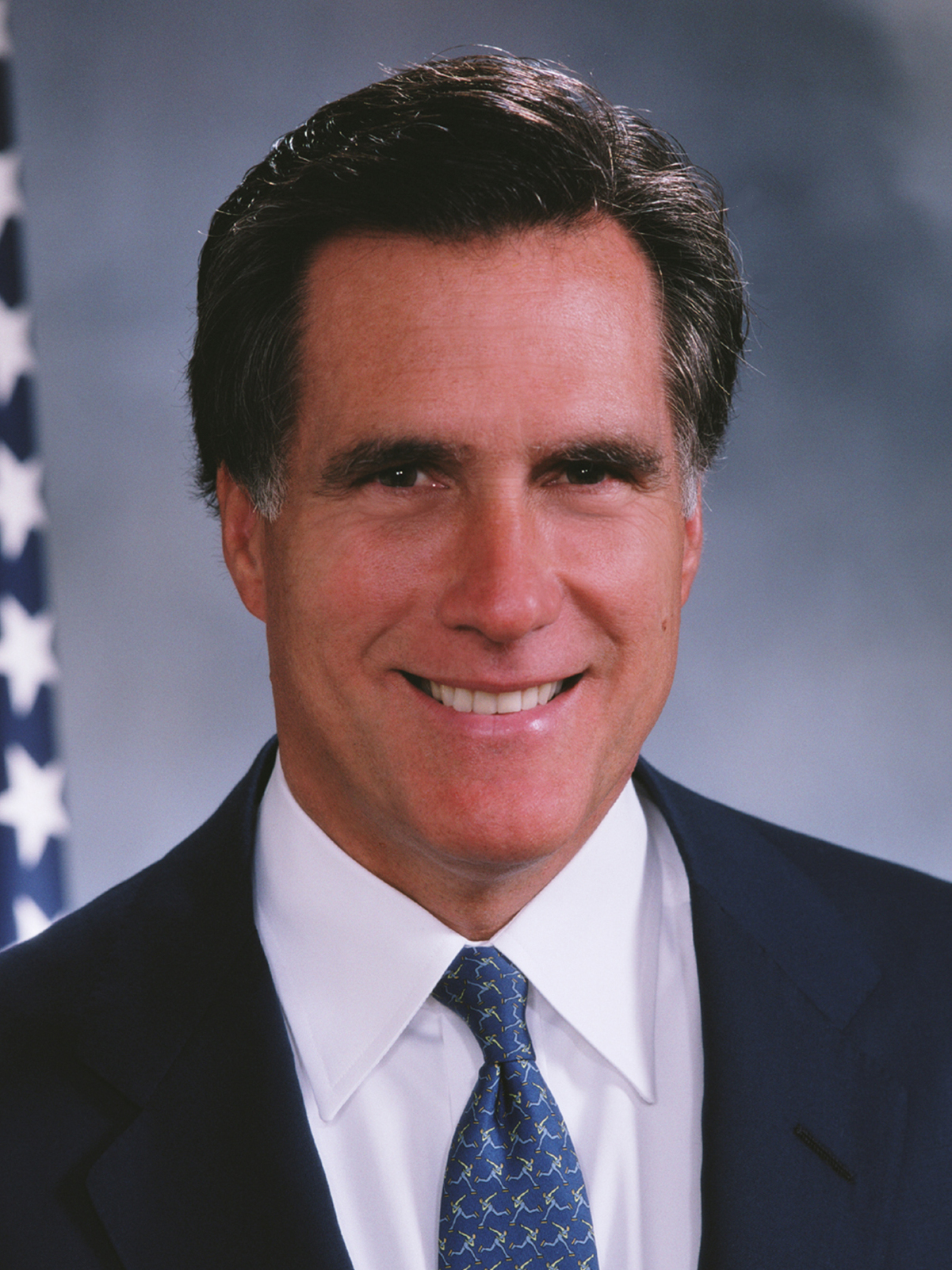

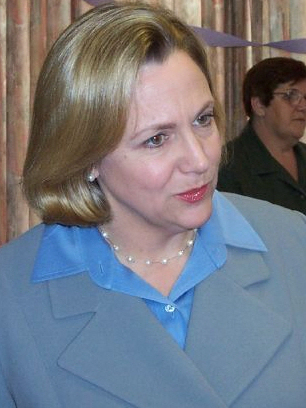
Nominee	Mitt Romney	Shannon O'Brien
Party	Republican	Democratic
Running mate	Kerry Healey	Chris Gabrieli
Popular vote	1,091,988	985,981
Percentage	49.8%	44.9%
- Romney: 40–50% 50–60% 60–70% 70–80% O'Brien: 40–50% 50–60% 60–70% 70–80% 80–90% >90% Tie: 40–50%
Governor before election
Jane Swift (acting)
Republican
Elected Governor
Mitt Romney
Republican

The 2002 Massachusetts gubernatorial election was held on November 5, 2002. Incumbent Republican acting governor Jane Swift chose not to seek a full term in office. Republican businessman Mitt Romney defeated Democratic Treasurer Shannon O'Brien.

This would be the last time Mitt Romney won this state, as in 2012, he lost the state to Barack Obama by a large margin.

== Michigan ==
2002 Michigan gubernatorial election
- November 5, 2002
- Turnout: 3,177,565
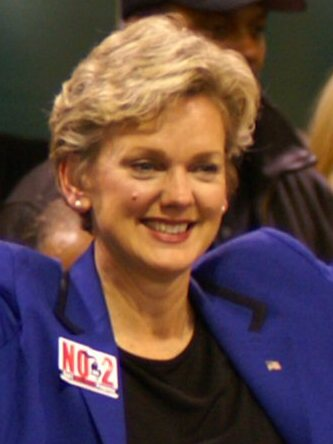

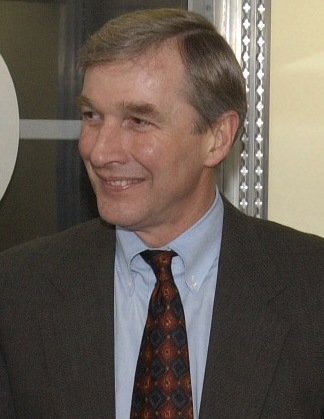
Nominee	Jennifer Granholm	Dick Posthumus
Party	Democratic	Republican
Running mate	John Cherry	Loren Bennett
Popular vote	1,631,276	1,504,755
Percentage	51.4%	47.4%
- County results Granholm: 40–50% 50–60% 60–70% Posthumus: 40–50% 50–60% 60–70% 70–80%
Governor before election
John Engler
Republican
Elected Governor
Jennifer Granholm
Democratic

The 2002 Michigan gubernatorial election was one of the 36 United States gubernatorial elections held on November 5, 2002. Incumbent Republican governor John Engler, after serving three terms, was term-limited and was ineligible to run for a fourth term; his lieutenant governor Dick Posthumus, also a Republican, ran in his place. Jennifer Granholm, then Attorney General of Michigan, ran on the Democratic Party ticket. Douglas Campbell ran on the Green Party ticket, and Joseph M. Pilchak ran on the Constitution Party ticket.

Granholm won with 51% of the vote, followed by Posthumus' 47%, Campbell with 1%, and Pilchak with less than 1%. This made Granholm the first female Michigan governor and the first Democratic governor of Michigan in 12 years.

== Minnesota ==
2002 Minnesota gubernatorial election
- November 5, 2002
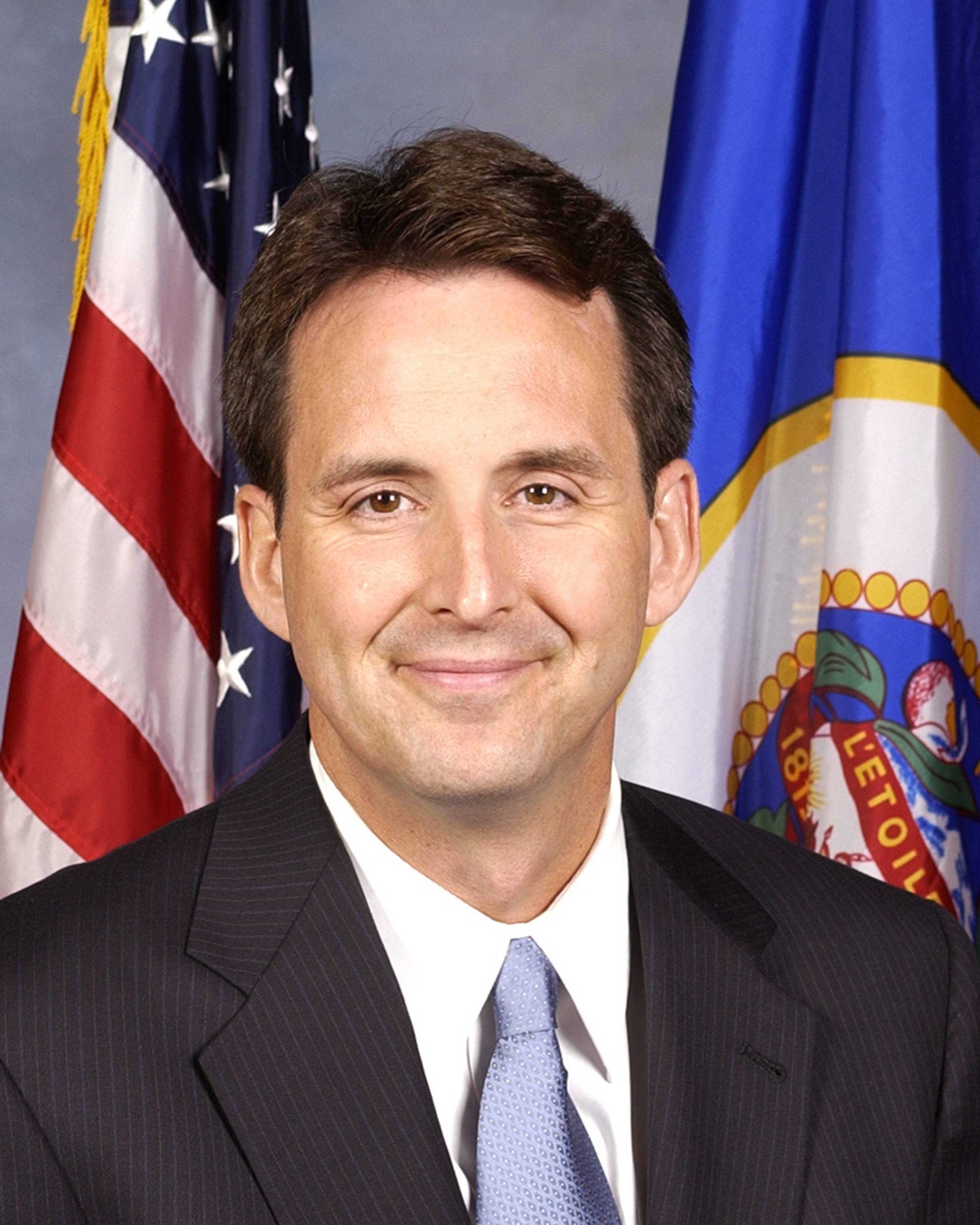

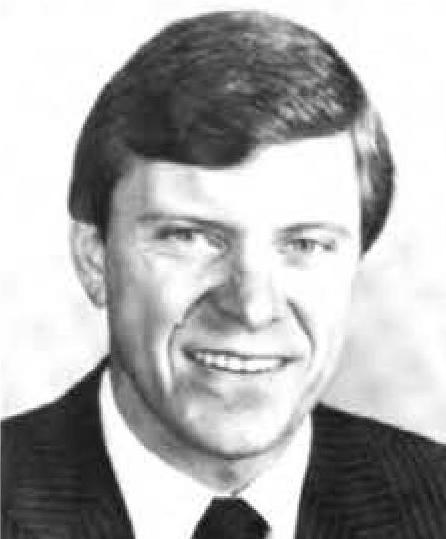

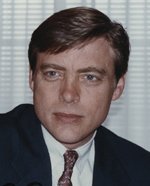
Nominee	Tim Pawlenty	Roger Moe	Tim Penny
Party	Republican	Democratic (DFL)	Independence
Running mate	Carol Molnau	Julie Sabo	Martha Robertson
Popular vote	999,473	821,268	364,534
Percentage	44.4%	36.5%	16.2%
- Pawlenty: 30–40% 40–50% 50–60% 60–70% 70–80% 80–90% >90% Moe: 30–40% 40–50% 50–60% 60–70% 70–80% 80–90% >90% Penny: 30–40% 40–50% 50–60% 60–70% 70–80% 80–90% >90% Tie: 20–30% 30–40% 40–50% 50%
Governor before election
Jesse Ventura
Independence
Elected Governor
Tim Pawlenty
Republican

The 2002 Minnesota gubernatorial election took place on November 5, 2002 for the post of Governor of Minnesota. Republican candidate Tim Pawlenty defeated Democratic candidate Roger Moe and Independence Party of Minnesota candidate Tim Penny. For personal reasons regarding the health of his spouse, incumbent governor Jesse Ventura chose not to seek re-election. Pawlenty comfortably won the election, which was attributed in part to Moe's uninspired campaign, with Moe being dubbed a "cautious dullard" four years later by the City Pages.

== Nebraska ==
2002 Nebraska gubernatorial election
- November 5, 2002
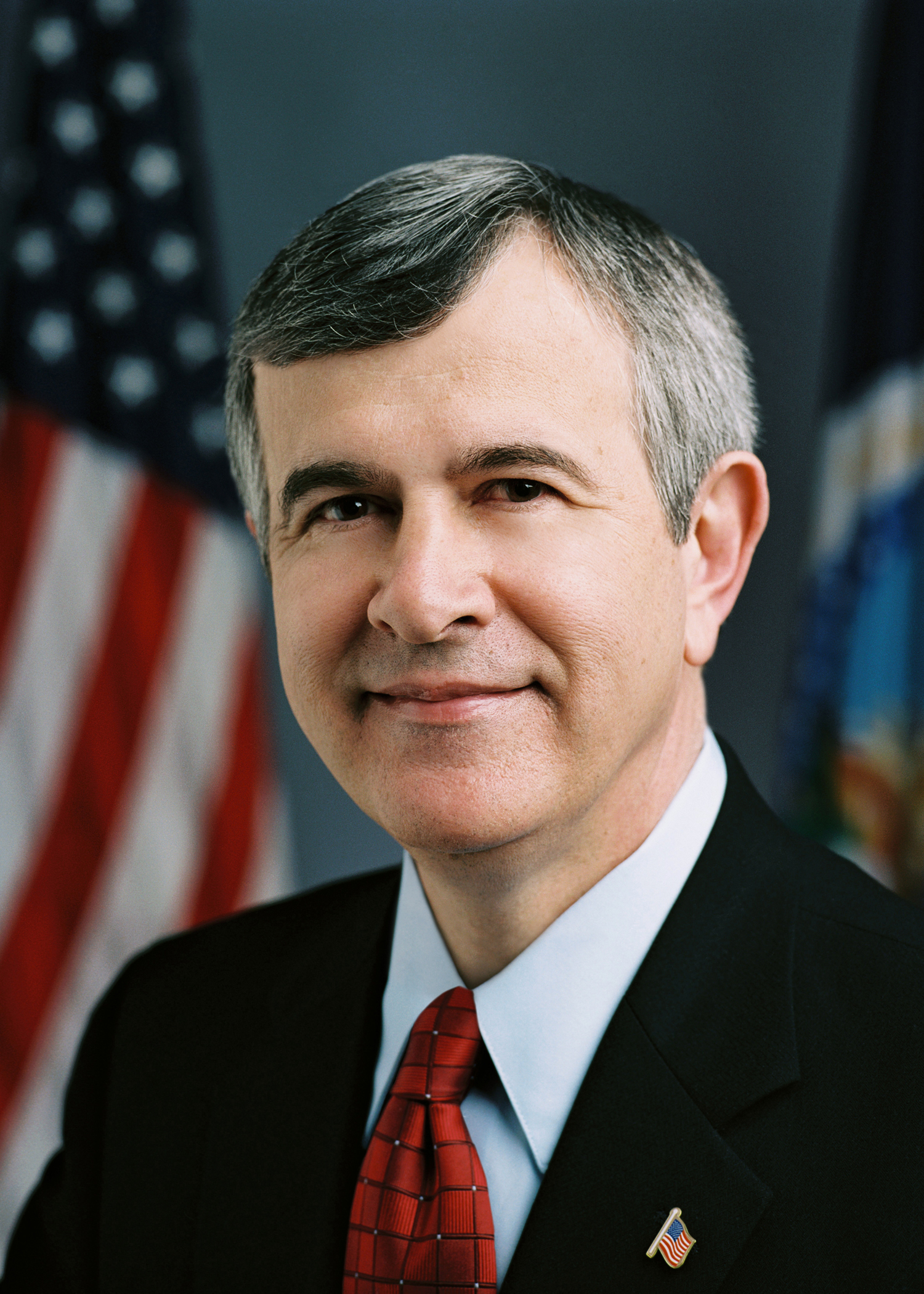

Nominee	Mike Johanns	Stormy Dean
Party	Republican	Democratic
Running mate	Dave Heineman	Melany Chesterman
Popular vote	330,349	132,348
Percentage	68.7%	27.5%
- County results Johanns: 50–60% 60–70% 70-80% 80–90%
Governor before election
Mike Johanns
Republican
Elected Governor
Mike Johanns
Republican

The 2002 Nebraska gubernatorial election, held on November 5, 2002, featured incumbent Republican Governor of Nebraska Mike Johanns defeating his Democratic opponent Stormy Dean in a landslide.

This was the first gubernatorial election in Nebraska where the winning primary candidates chose their running mates after the primary election. Prior to this, both the governor and the lieutenant governor were chosen at the primary election. This was also the first gubernatorial election in which a Republican was re-elected in more than forty years.

== Nevada ==
2002 Nevada gubernatorial election
- November 5, 2002
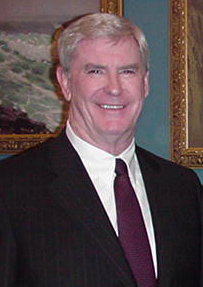

Nominee	Kenny Guinn	Joe Neal
Party	Republican	Democratic
Popular vote	344,001	110,935
Percentage	68.2%	22.0%
- County results Guinn: 60–70% 70–80% 80–90%
Governor before election
Kenny Guinn
Republican
Elected Governor
Kenny Guinn
Republican

The 2002 Nevada gubernatorial election took place on November 5, 2002. Incumbent Republican governor Kenny Guinn defeated Democratic nominee and Nevada Senator Joe Neal in a landslide to win a second term.

== New Hampshire ==
2002 New Hampshire gubernatorial election
- November 5, 2002
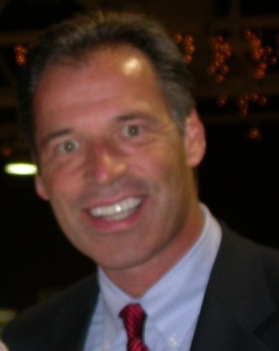

Nominee	Craig Benson	Mark Fernald
Party	Republican	Democratic
Popular vote	259,663	169,277
Percentage	58.7%	38.2%
- Benson: 40–50% 50–60% 60–70% 70–80% 80–90% >90% Fernald: 40–50% 50–60% 60–70% >90%
Governor before election
Jeanne Shaheen
Democratic
Elected Governor
Craig Benson
Republican

The 2002 New Hampshire gubernatorial election was held on November 5, 2002. Three-term incumbent Democratic governor Jeanne Shaheen opted to unsuccessfully run for the United States Senate rather than seek a fourth term as governor. Republican Craig Benson, a self-funded businessman, defeated Democrat Mark Fernald, a state senator, in the general election after both won contested primary elections.

This was the only time a Republican was elected governor between 1994 and 2016.

== New Mexico ==
2002 New Mexico gubernatorial election
- November 5, 2002
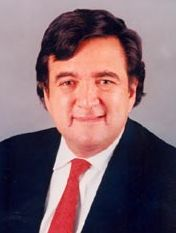

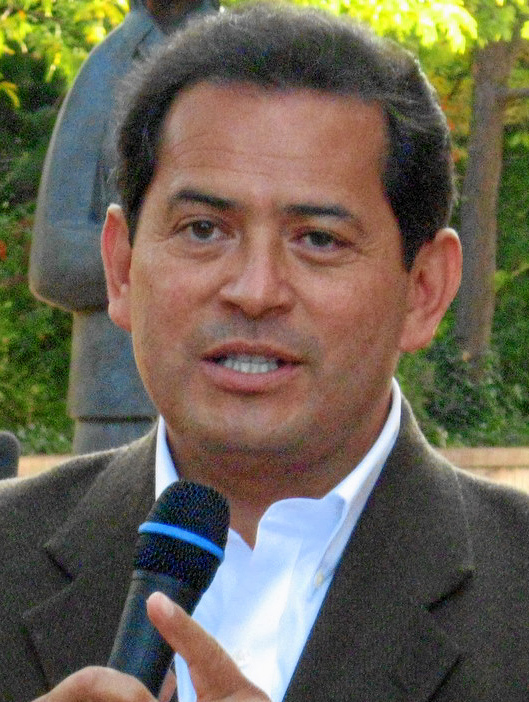

Nominee	Bill Richardson	John Sanchez	David Bacon
Party	Democratic	Republican	Green
Running mate	Diane Denish	Rod Adair
Popular vote	268,693	189,074	26,465
Percentage	55.5%	39.0%	5.5%
- County results Richardson: 40–50% 50–60% 60–70% 70–80% Sanchez: 40–50% 50–60% 60–70%
Governor before election
Gary Johnson
Republican
Elected Governor
Bill Richardson
Democratic

The 2002 New Mexico gubernatorial election was a race for the governor of New Mexico. The winner of the election held on November 5, 2002, served from January 1, 2003 until January 1, 2007. Incumbent Republican Gary Johnson was term limited. Former U.S. Congressman Bill Richardson won the election. Green Party nominee David Bacon received over 5% of the total vote, including over 11% in Santa Fe County, which was his best showing.

== New York ==
2002 New York gubernatorial election
- November 5, 2002
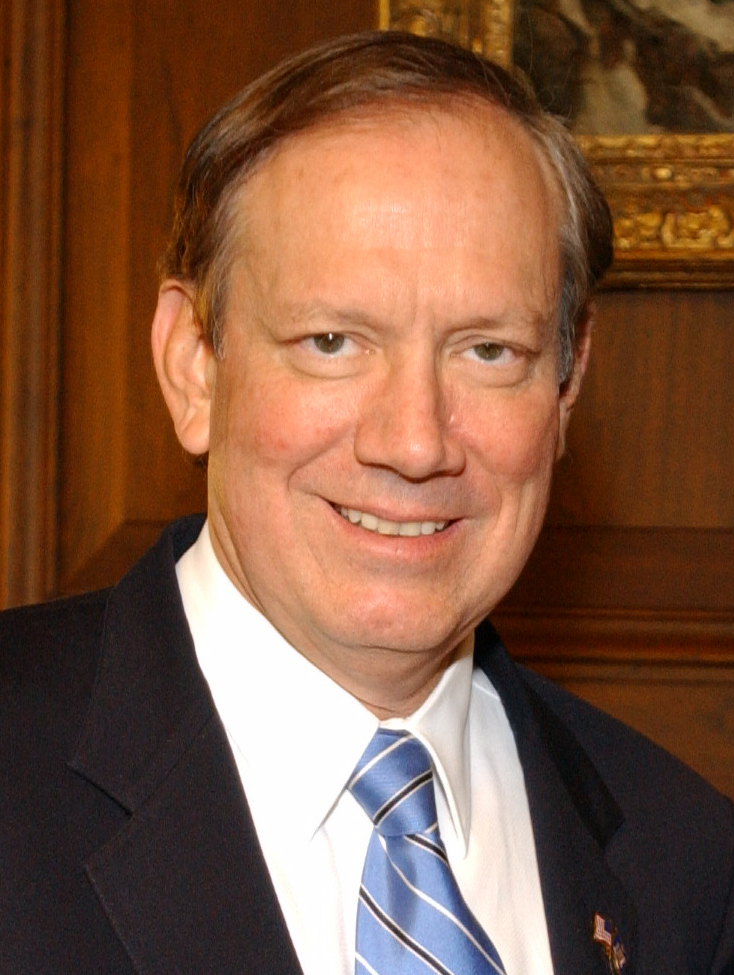

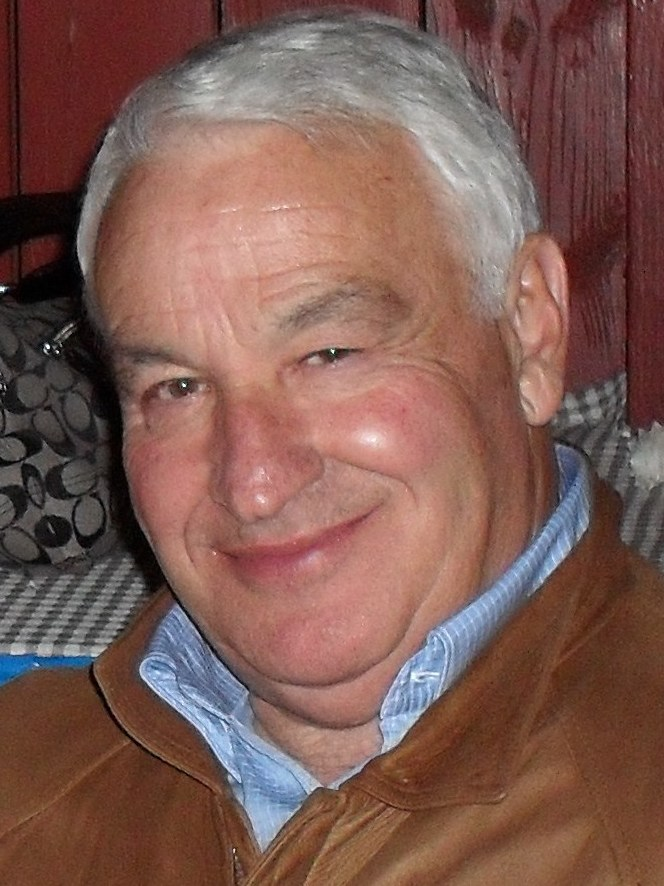
Nominee	George Pataki	Carl McCall	Tom Golisano
Party	Republican	Democratic	Independence
Alliance	Conservative	Working Families
Running mate	Mary Donohue	Dennis Mehiel	Mary Donohue
Popular vote	2,262,255	1,534,064	654,016
Percentage	49.4%	33.5%	14.3%
- County results Pataki: 40–50% 50–60% 60–70% 70–80% McCall: 40–50% 50–60% 60–70% Golisano: 30–40%
Governor before election
George Pataki
Republican
Elected Governor
George Pataki
Republican

The 2002 New York gubernatorial election was held on November 5, 2002. Republican governor George Pataki was re-elected to a third term, defeating Democrat Carl McCall and Rochester billionaire Tom Golisano, who ran on the Independence Party line. As of 2023, this was the last time a Republican won a statewide election in New York, and the last time Albany, Tompkins and Westchester counties have voted Republican in a statewide election.

On Election Day, Pataki was easily re-elected, but fell short of receiving 50% of the vote. McCall received 33% of the vote, carrying New York City (other than Staten Island) and nearly carrying Albany County. In contrast to the norm for multiple third party campaigns, Golisano did better than his previous elections, receiving 14% of the vote and carrying his home county of Monroe in western New York.

== Ohio ==
2002 Ohio gubernatorial election
- November 5, 2002
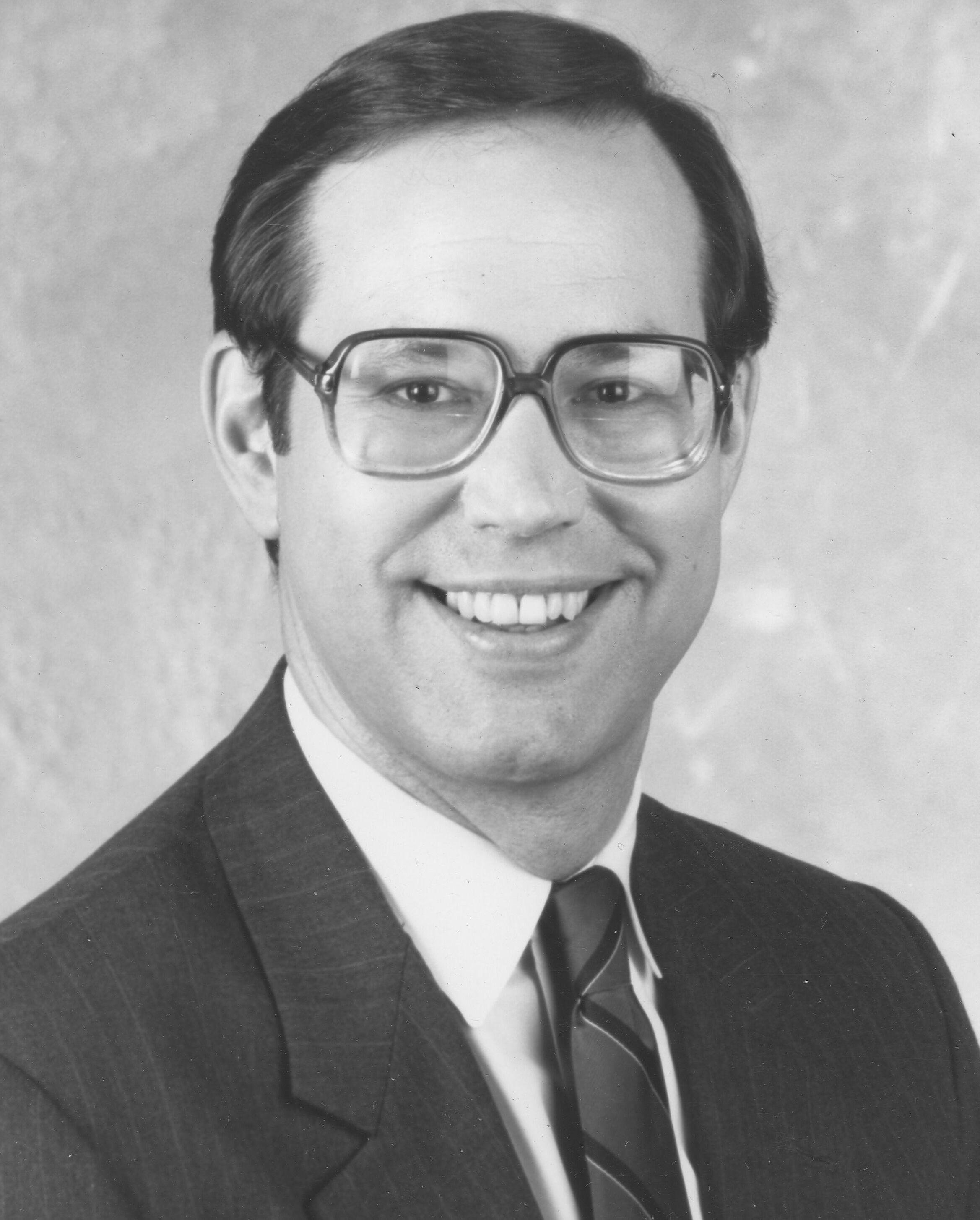

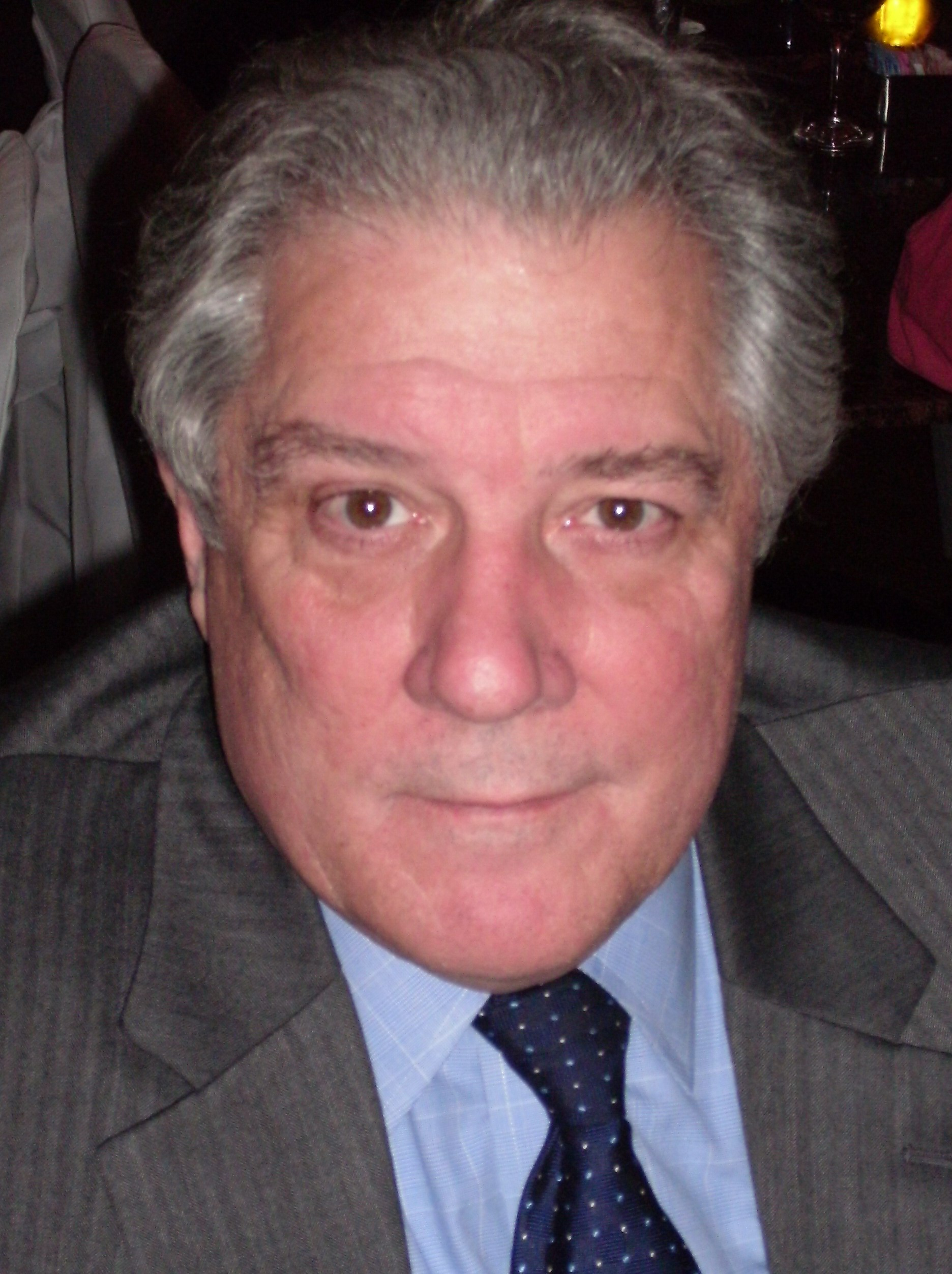
Nominee	Bob Taft	Tim Hagan
Party	Republican	Democratic
Popular vote	1,865,007	1,236,924
Percentage	57.8%	38.3%
- County results Taft: 40–50% 50–60% 60–70% 70–80% Hagan: 40–50% 50–60%
Governor before election
Bob Taft
Republican
Elected Governor
Bob Taft
Republican

The 2002 Ohio gubernatorial election took place on November 5, 2002. Incumbent Republican Governor of Ohio Bob Taft ran for re-election to a second and final term as governor, and he was opposed by Democratic nominee Tim Hagan, a former Cuyahoga County Commissioner. The race between Taft and Hagan was not competitive, and Taft was re-elected by a substantial margin, ensuring him a second term in office.

As of 2022, this was the last time that someone other than a current or former member of Congress was elected to the governorship.

== Oklahoma ==
2002 Oklahoma gubernatorial election
- November 5, 2002
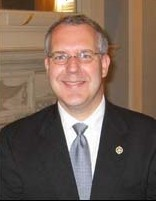

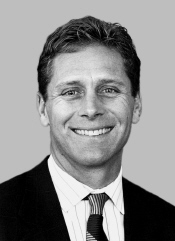

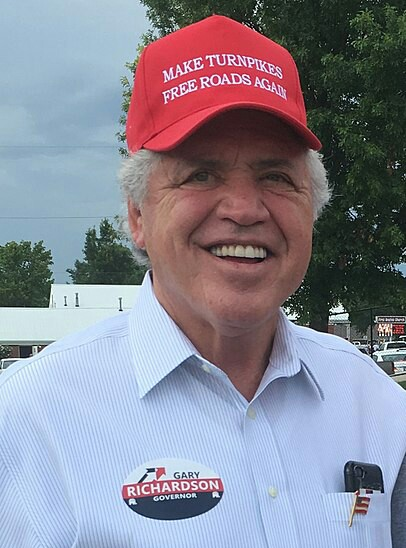
Nominee	Brad Henry	Steve Largent	Gary Richardson
Party	Democratic	Republican	Independent
Popular vote	448,143	441,277	146,200
Percentage	43.3%	42.6%	14.1%
- Henry: 40–50% 50–60% 60–70% Largent: 40–50% 50–60% 60–70% 70–80%
Governor before election
Frank Keating
Republican
Elected Governor
Brad Henry
Democratic

The 2002 Oklahoma gubernatorial election was held on November 5, 2002, and was a race for Governor of Oklahoma. Democrat Brad Henry won the election with 43 percent of the vote, beating Republican Steve Largent and conservative independent Gary Richardson.

Henry's narrow win has been attributed to Richardson and Largent's split of the conservative vote and the inclusion of a cockfighting ban on the ballot, an issue which brought cockfighting supporters from Southeastern Oklahoma, a traditional Democratic stronghold that strongly supported Henry, out to vote.

== Oregon ==
2002 Oregon gubernatorial election
- November 5, 2002
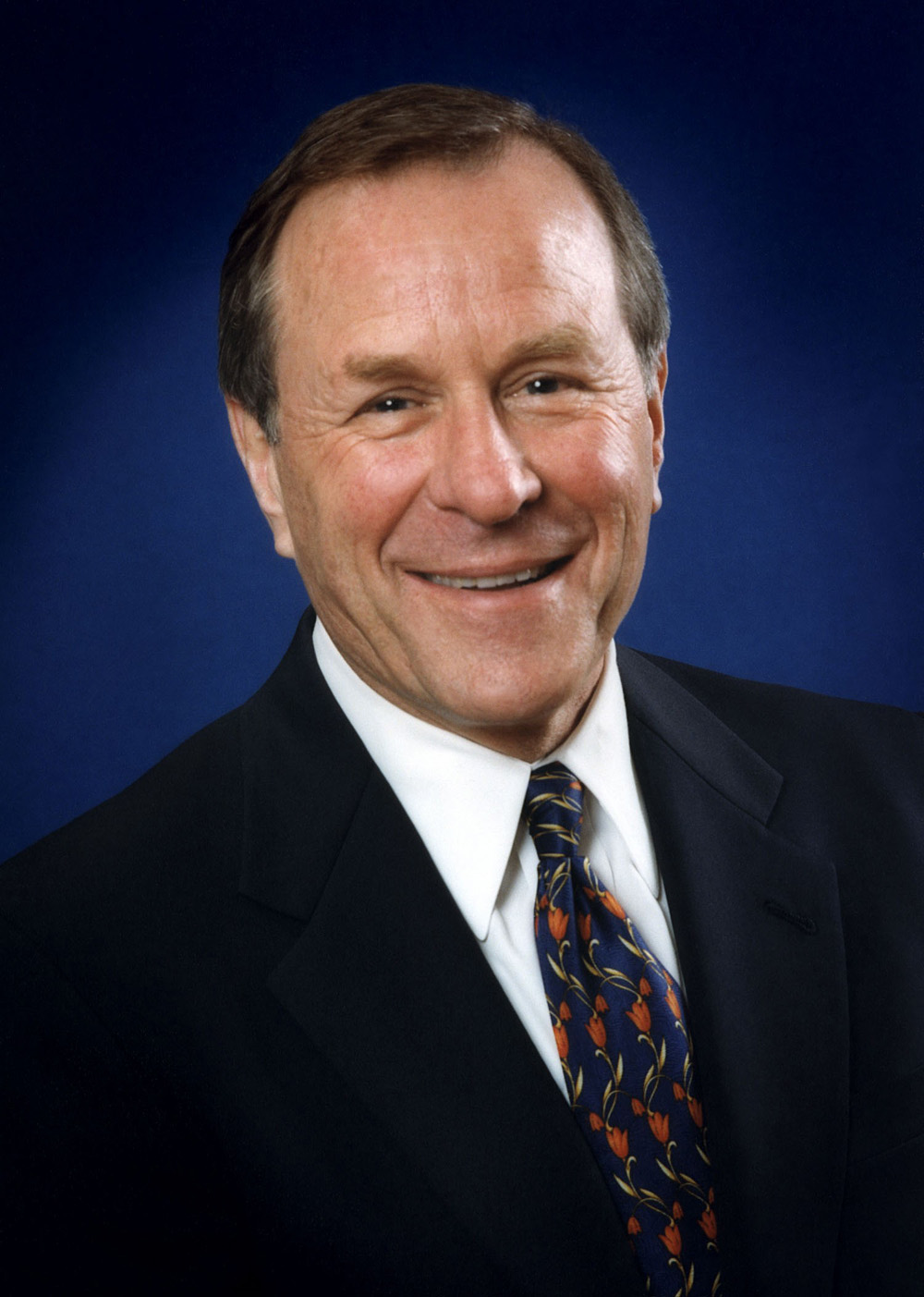

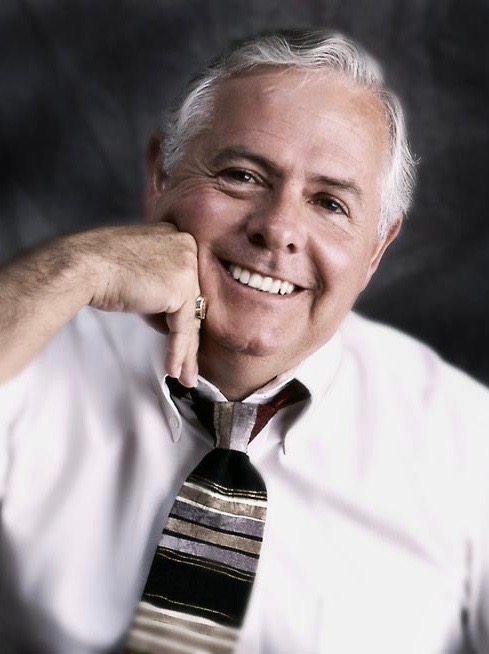
Nominee	Ted Kulongoski	Kevin Mannix
Party	Democratic	Republican
Popular vote	618,004	581,785
Percentage	49.0%	46.2%
- County results Kulongoski: 40–50% 50–60% 60–70% Mannix: 40–50% 50–60% 60–70% 70–80%
Governor before election
John Kitzhaber
Democratic
Elected Governor
Ted Kulongoski
Democratic

The 2002 Oregon gubernatorial election took place on November 5, 2002. Incumbent Democratic Governor of Oregon John Kitzhaber was unable to seek a third consecutive term as governor, therefore creating an open seat. To replace him, former Oregon Supreme Court Associate Justice Ted Kulongoski won a crowded and competitive Democratic primary, while former State Representative Kevin Mannix emerged from an equally competitive Republican primary. The campaign between Kulongoski and Mannix, who were joined by Libertarian nominee Tom Cox, was close and went down to the wire. Ultimately, Kulongoski eked out a narrow margin of victory over Mannix, which was slightly smaller than Cox's total vote share, allowing Kulongoski to win what would be the first of two terms as governor.

== Pennsylvania ==
2002 Pennsylvania gubernatorial election
- November 5, 2002
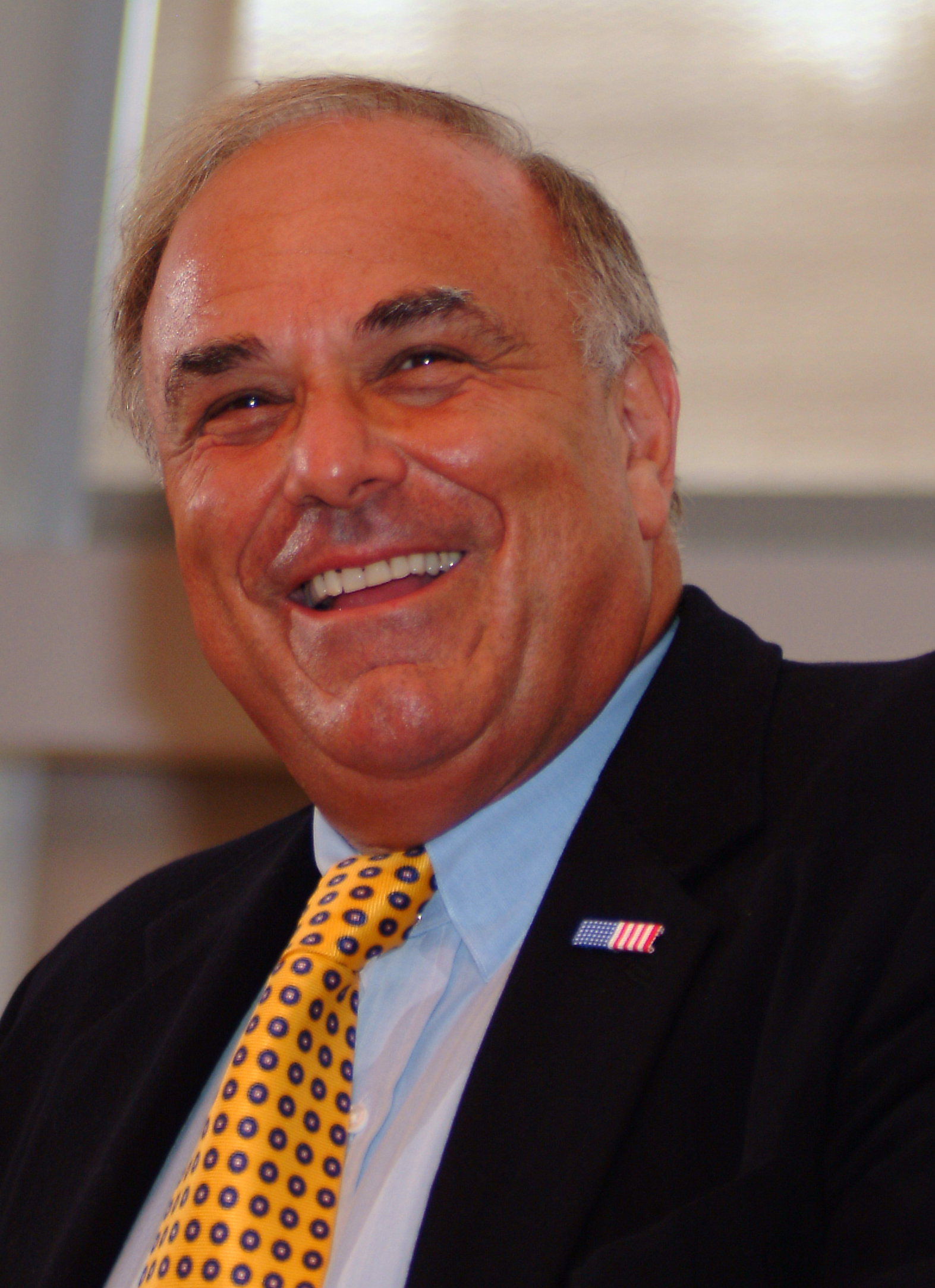

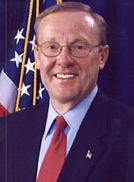
Nominee	Ed Rendell	Mike Fisher
Party	Democratic	Republican
Running mate	Catherine Baker Knoll	Jane Earll
Popular vote	1,913,235	1,589,408
Percentage	53.4%	44.4%
- Rendell: 50–60% 60–70% 70–80% 80–90% >90% Swann: 50–60% 60–70% 70–80% 80–90% >90% Tie: 50% No data
Governor before election
Mark Schweiker
Republican
Elected Governor
Ed Rendell
Democratic

The 2002 Pennsylvania gubernatorial election was held on November 5, 2002, to elect the governor and Lieutenant Governor of Pennsylvania. Incumbent Republican governor Mark Schweiker, who took office in 2001 when Tom Ridge resigned to become Homeland Security Advisor, was eligible to run for a full term, but did not do so. Democrat Ed Rendell, the former mayor of Philadelphia and Chairman of the Democratic National Committee, emerged from a competitive primary to win the general election against Republican Pennsylvania Attorney General Mike Fisher.

Rendell won the election, with commentators attributing his victory to "endless retail politicking" and a hard-working campaign. The political website PoliticsPA praised Rendell's campaign team of David L. Cohen, David W. Sweet, and Sandi Vito. Fisher's strategy backfired; Rendell performed well in much of Eastern Pennsylvania and he was able to win by huge margins in even many traditionally Republican suburbs.

Rendell was the first official from Philadelphia to win the governorship since 1914. This was the first time since 1826 that a Democrat won all four of Philadelphia's suburban counties and the first time since 1970 that a Democrat won Montgomery County in a gubernatorial election.

== Rhode Island ==
2002 Rhode Island gubernatorial election
- November 5, 2002
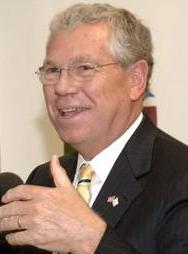

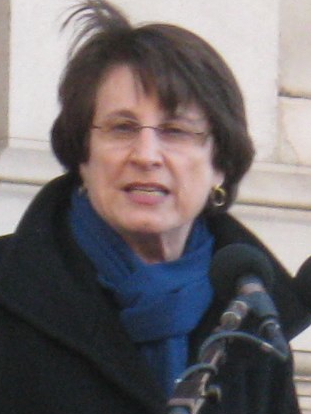
Nominee	Donald Carcieri	Myrth York
Party	Republican	Democratic
Popular vote	181,827	150,229
Percentage	54.8%	45.2%
- Carcieri: 50–60% 60–70% 70–80% York: 50–60% 60–70%
Governor before election
Lincoln Almond
Republican
Elected Governor
Donald Carcieri
Republican

The 2002 Rhode Island gubernatorial election took place on November 5, 2002. Incumbent Republican governor Lincoln Almond was term-limited. Republican Donald Carcieri won the open seat, defeating Democrat Myrth York.

In the Republican primary election, Carcieri defeated James Bennett, who had won the endorsement of the state Republican Party.

The 2002 campaign was particularly costly to York as she spent $3.8 million of her own money to finance what was to be her last bid for elected office. A key turning point in the campaign was when York criticized Carcieri for the actions of businesses he had been associated with but refused to answer Carcieri's request that she reveal what companies her personal assets were invested in.

== South Carolina ==
2002 South Carolina gubernatorial election
- November 5, 2002
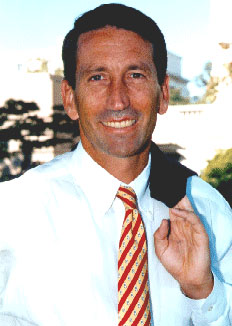

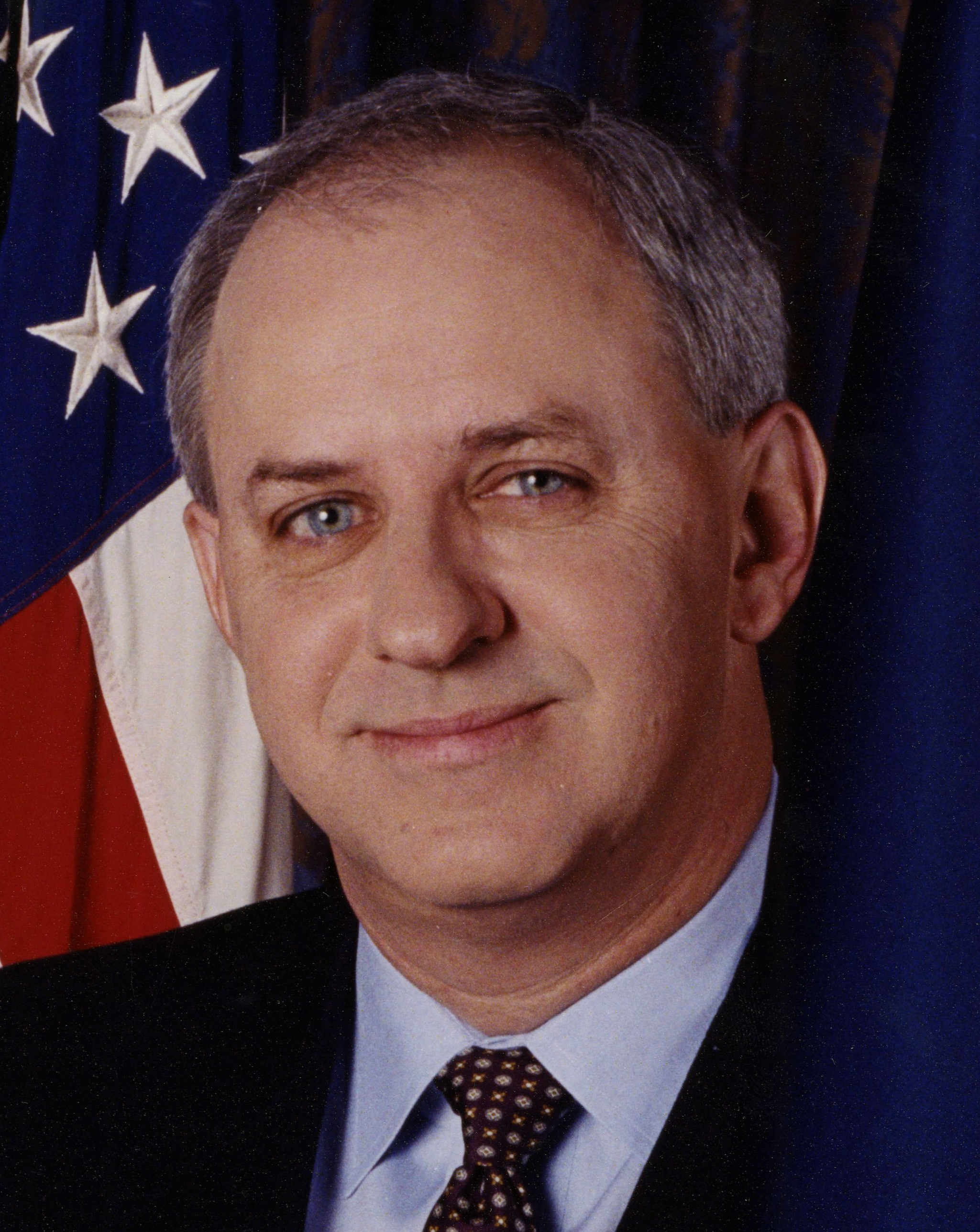
Nominee	Mark Sanford	Jim Hodges
Party	Republican	Democratic
Popular vote	585,422	521,140
Percentage	52.9%	47.0%
- County results Sanford: 50–60% 60–70% Hodges: 50–60% 60–70% 70–80%
Governor before election
Jim Hodges
Democratic
Elected Governor
Mark Sanford
Republican

The 2002 South Carolina gubernatorial election was held on November 5, 2002 to select the governor of the state of South Carolina. Mark Sanford, the Republican nominee, defeated incumbent Democratic governor Jim Hodges to become the 115th governor of South Carolina. Hodges became only the third incumbent governor and the first Democratic governor in South Carolina history to lose reelection.

== South Dakota ==
2002 South Dakota gubernatorial election
- November 2, 2002
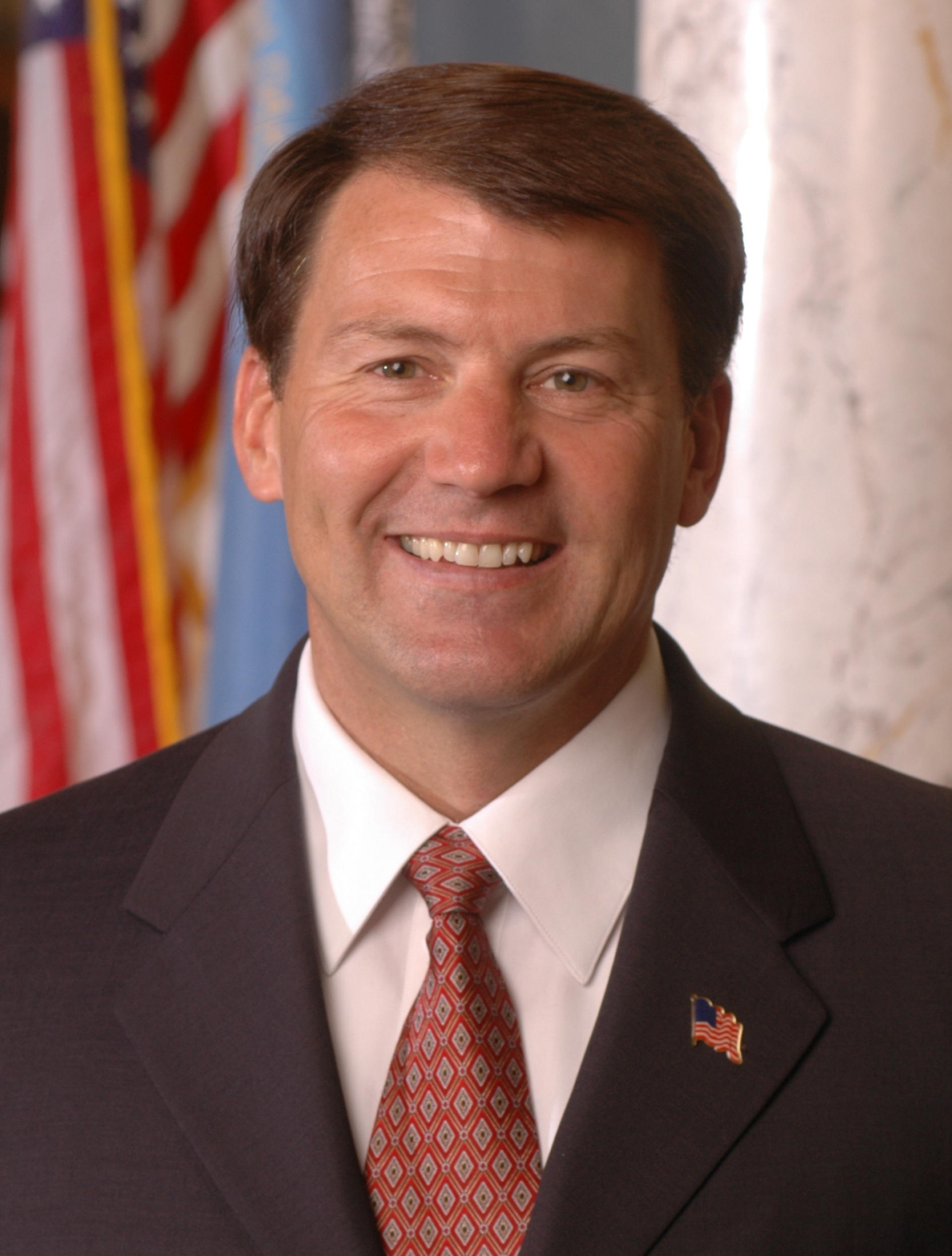

Nominee	Mike Rounds	Jim Abbott
Party	Republican	Democratic
Running mate	Dennis Daugaard	Michael Wilson
Popular vote	189,920	140,263
Percentage	56.8%	41.9%
- County results Rounds: 50-60% 60-70% 70-80% 80-90% Abbott: 50–60% 60–70% 70–80% 80–90%
Governor before election
Bill Janklow
Republican
Elected Governor
Mike Rounds
Republican

The 2002 South Dakota gubernatorial election took place on November 2, 2002 to elect a governor of South Dakota. Republican nominee Mike Rounds was elected, defeating Democratic nominee Jim Abbott.

== Tennessee ==
2002 Tennessee gubernatorial election
- November 5, 2002
- Turnout: 50.40% ▲17.87 pp
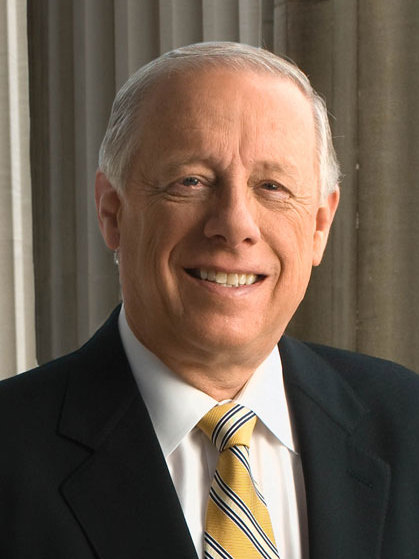

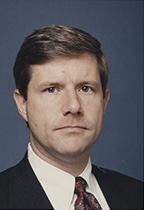
Nominee	Phil Bredesen	Van Hilleary
Party	Democratic	Republican
Popular vote	837,284	786,803
Percentage	50.6%	47.6%
- County results Bredesen: 40–50% 50–60% 60–70% 70–80% Hilleary: 40–50% 50–60% 60–70%
Governor before election
Don Sundquist
Republican
Elected Governor
Phil Bredesen
Democratic

The 2002 Tennessee gubernatorial election was held on November 5, 2002, to elect the next governor of Tennessee. The incumbent, Don Sundquist, was term-limited and is prohibited by the Constitution of Tennessee from seeking a third consecutive term. To succeed him, former Nashville Mayor Phil Bredesen, the Democratic nominee, who had run against Sundquist in 1994, narrowly defeated United States Congressman Van Hilleary, the Republican nominee, in the general election.

With this win, Bredesen flipped the state back into Democratic control, with the state legislature also being controlled by Democrats.

== Texas ==
2002 Texas gubernatorial election
- November 5, 2002
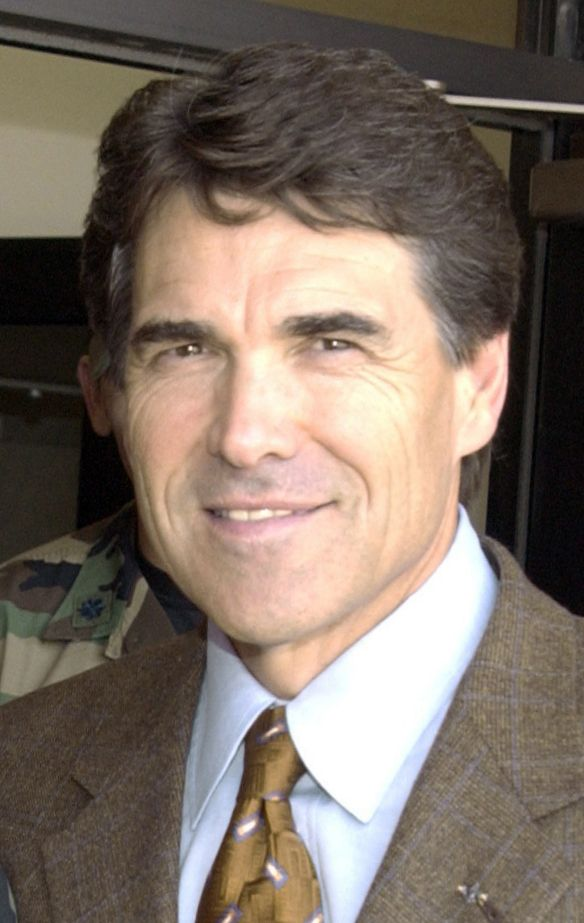

Nominee	Rick Perry	Tony Sanchez
Party	Republican	Democratic
Popular vote	2,632,591	1,819,798
Percentage	57.8%	40.0%
- County results Perry: 50–60% 60–70% 70–80% 80–90% Sanchez: 40–50% 50–60% 60–70% 70–80% 80–90%
Governor before election
Rick Perry
Republican
Elected Governor
Rick Perry
Republican

The 2002 Texas gubernatorial election was held on November 5, 2002, to elect the governor of Texas. Incumbent Republican governor Rick Perry, who had ascended to the governorship after the resignation of George W. Bush to become President of the United States, was elected to his first full term in office, winning 58% of the vote to Democrat Tony Sanchez's 40%.

Perry carried 218 out of 254 counties, while Sanchez only carried 36. Exit polls showed Perry easily won among white voters with 72% while Sanchez won the African American vote with 85% and the Latino vote with 65%. His second inauguration for a first full four-year term began on January 21, 2003, on the Texas State Capitol South Grounds.

As of 2022, this was the last time the Republican candidate carried Dallas County, and the last time Republicans kept the vote margins within the single digits in Travis County.

== Vermont ==
2002 Vermont gubernatorial election
- November 5, 2002
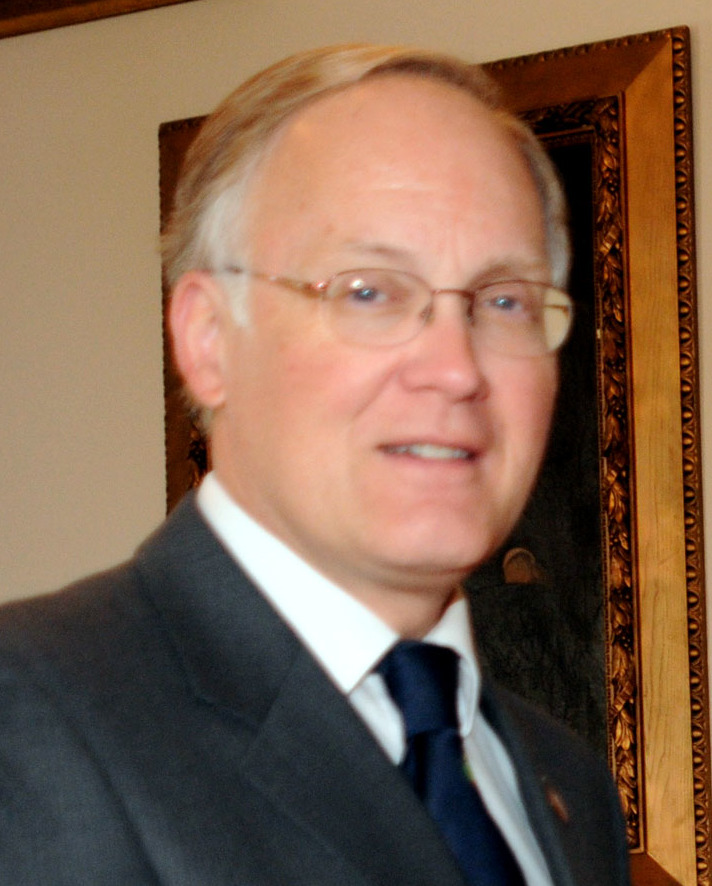

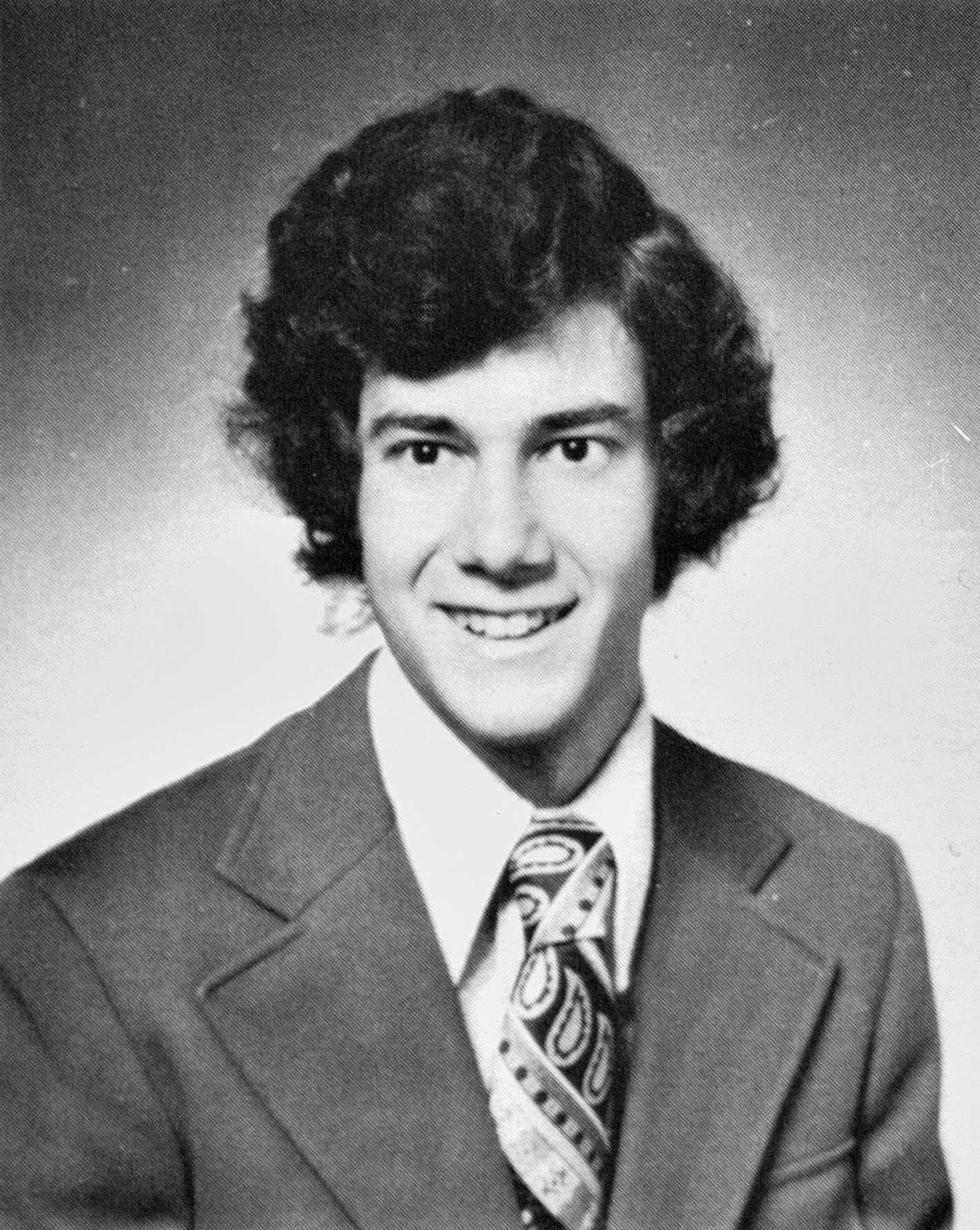

Nominee	Jim Douglas	Doug Racine	Cornelius Hogan
Party	Republican	Democratic	Independent
Popular vote	103,436	97,565	22,353
Percentage	44.9%	42.4%	9.7%
- Douglas: 30-40% 40-50% 50-60% 60-70% 70-80% 80-90% Racine: 30-40% 40-50% 50-60% 60-70% 70-80%
Governor before election
Howard Dean
Democratic
Elected Governor
Jim Douglas
Republican

The 2002 Vermont gubernatorial election took place on November 5, 2002. Incumbent Democratic Governor Howard Dean did not run for re-election to a sixth full term as Governor of Vermont. Republican Jim Douglas defeated Democratic candidate Doug Racine and independent candidate Cornelius Hogan, among others, to succeed him. Since no candidate received a majority in the popular vote, Douglas was elected by the Vermont General Assembly per the state constitution.

The race was very close, with Douglas prevailing by just under 6,000 votes or 2.56%. In Vermont for statewide/executive races if no candidate receives 50% then the Vermont General Assembly picks the winner. However, Racine declined to contest it further and conceded to Douglas. Ultimately it was Douglas's strong performance in Montpelier and Rutland that carried him to victory. Racine did do well in populous Burlington and greater Chittenden County, but it ultimately did not suffice. Racine called Douglas at 12:38 P.M. EST and conceded defeat. Douglas would go on to be reelected three more times. Racine would run for governor one last time in 2010, but narrowly lost the Democratic Primary to Peter Shumlin. After the close contest, Shumlin chose Racine to be his Secretary of Human Services. Racine stepped down from that post in 2014.

== Wisconsin ==
2002 Wisconsin gubernatorial election
- November 5, 2002
- Turnout: 45.43%
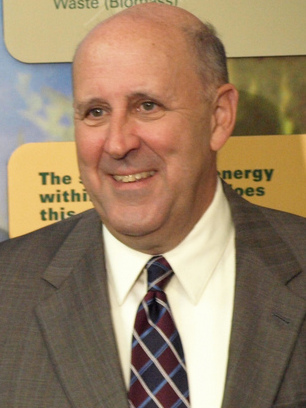

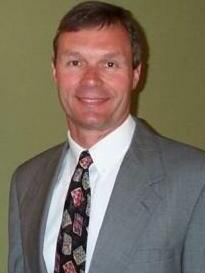
Nominee	Jim Doyle	Scott McCallum	Ed Thompson
Party	Democratic	Republican	Libertarian
Popular vote	800,515	734,779	185,455
Percentage	45.1%	41.4%	10.4%
- Doyle: 30–40% 40–50% 50–60% 60–70% 70–80% 80–90% >90% McCallum: 30–40% 40–50% 50–60% 60–70% 70–80% 80–90% >90% Thompson 30–40% 40–50% 50–60% 60–70% Tie: No data
Governor before election
Scott McCallum
Republican
Elected Governor
Jim Doyle
Democratic

The 2002 Wisconsin gubernatorial election was held on November 5, 2002. Incumbent Republican Governor of Wisconsin Scott McCallum, who had assumed office upon the resignation of Tommy Thompson, ran for his first full term in office. McCallum won his party's nomination by defeating two minor candidates, and Attorney General of Wisconsin Jim Doyle won the Democratic primary with a little more than a third of the vote in a highly competitive primary election. In the general election, the presence of Ed Thompson, former governor Tommy Thompson's younger brother, the Mayor of Tomah, and the Libertarian Party nominee, held both McCallum and Doyle to under fifty percent of the vote, enabling Doyle to win with 45% of the vote, defeating McCallum.

== Wyoming ==
2002 Wyoming gubernatorial election
- November 5, 2002
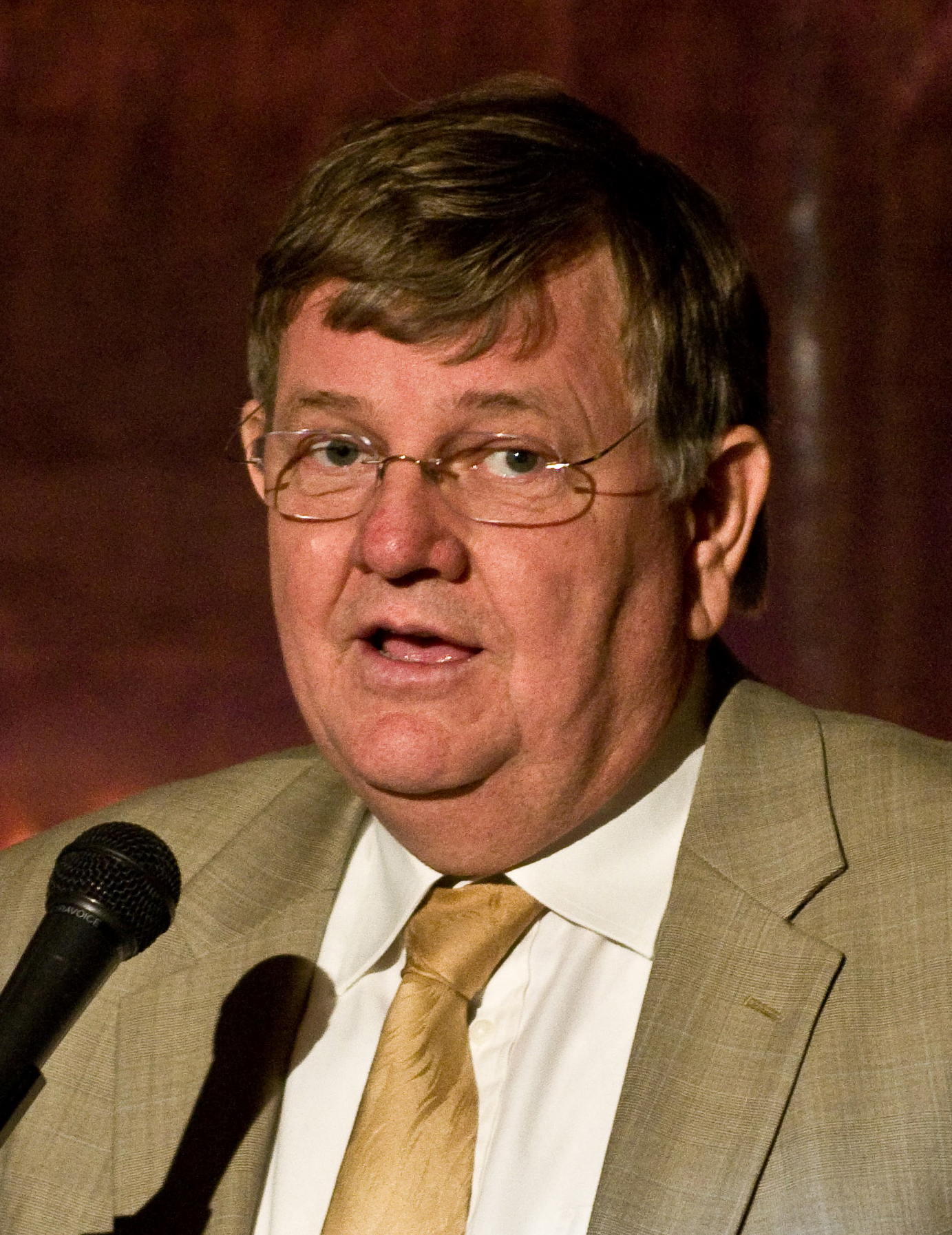

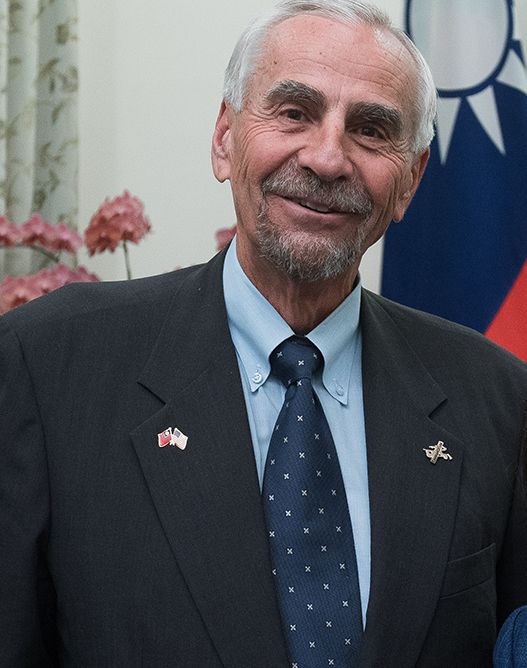
Nominee	Dave Freudenthal	Eli Bebout
Party	Democratic	Republican
Popular vote	92,662	88,873
Percentage	50.0%	47.9%
- County results Freudenthal: 50–60% 60–70% Bebout: 40–50% 50–60% 60–70%
Governor before election
Jim Geringer
Republican
Elected Governor
Dave Freudenthal
Democratic

The 2002 Wyoming gubernatorial election was held on November 5, 2002. Incumbent Republican Governor Jim Geringer was term-limited and unable to seek a third term in office, thereby creating an open seat. Former U.S. Attorney Dave Freudenthal and former Wyoming House Speaker Eli Bebout both emerged from competitive Democratic and Republican primaries, respectively, and faced off against each other in the general election. Despite Wyoming's strong inclination to elect Republicans, a contentious race ensued, with Freudenthal ultimately defeating Bebout by fewer than 4,000 votes.

== Territories and federal district ==
=== District of Columbia ===
Washington, D.C. election
Party	Candidate	Votes	%
Democratic	Anthony A. Williams (incumbent)	{{{votes}}}	60.6%
Republican	Carol Schwartz	{{{votes}}}	34.5%
DC Statehood Green	Steve Donkin	{{{votes}}}	2.5%
Total votes		{{{votes}}}	100.00
Democratic hold			

=== Guam ===
Guam election
Party	Candidate	Votes	%
Republican	Felix Perez Camacho	{{{votes}}}	55.4%
Democratic	Robert A. Underwood	{{{votes}}}	44.5%
Total votes		{{{votes}}}	100.00
Republican gain from Democratic			

=== U.S. Virgin Islands ===
U.S. Virgin Islands election
Party	Candidate	Votes	%
Democratic	Charles Turnbull (incumbent)	{{{votes}}}	50.1%
Independent	John P. de Jongh	{{{votes}}}	24.5%
Total votes		{{{votes}}}	100.00
Democratic hold			

== See also ==
- 2002 United States elections
  - 2002 United States Senate elections
  - 2002 United States House of Representatives elections
