= PVHS =

PVHS may refer to:

- Paloma Valley High School, Menifee, California
- Palos Verdes High School, Palos Verdes Estates, California
- Penobscot Valley High School, Howland, Maine
- Pojoaque Valley High School, Pojoaque, New Mexico
- Piedra Vista High School, Farmington, New Mexico
- Pinole Valley High School, Pinole, California
- Palo Verde High School, Las Vegas, Nevada
- Pahrump Valley High School, Pahrump, Nevada
- Paradise Valley High School, Paradise Valley, Arizona
- Park Vista Community High School, Lake Worth, Florida
- Pascack Valley High School, Hillsdale, New Jersey
- Passaic Valley High School, Little Falls, New Jersey
- Pleasant Valley High School (Jacksonville, Alabama), Jacksonville, Alabama
- Pleasant Valley High School (California), Chico, California
- Pleasant Valley High School (Iowa), Pleasant Valley, Iowa
- Pleasant Valley High School (Pennsylvania), Brodheadsville, Pennsylvania
- Ponte Vedra High School, Ponte Vedra Beach, Florida
- Poudre Valley Health System, Larimer County, Colorado
- Perkiomen Valley High School (Pennsylvania), Collegeville, Pennsylvania, see Perkiomen Valley School District
- Panther Valley High School, Borough of Summit Hill, Pennsylvania
