= Pamela Hatch =

American politician (1948–2023)

Member of the Maine Senate from the 26th district
- In office 2002–2004
- Preceded by: Peter Mills
- Succeeded by: Peter Mills

Member of the Maine House of Representatives
- In office 1992–2000
- Preceded by: Michael F. Hepburn
- Succeeded by: Paul R. Hatch
- Constituency: 100th district (1992–1994); 98th district (1994–2000)

Personal details
- Born: Pamela Victoria Henderson; June 22, 1948 Lincoln, Maine, U.S.
- Died: May 21, 2023 (aged 74)
- Party: Democratic
- Spouse: Paul Raymond Hatch (m. 1967)
- Children: 2
- Education: University of Maine

Pamela Henderson Hatch (July 22, 1948 – May 21, 2023) was an American politician from Maine. Hatch, a Democrat from Skowhegan, served 5 terms in the Maine Legislature between 1992 and 2004. She served four terms (8 years) in the Maine House of Representatives (District 100 and 98) from 1992 to 2000 and served as committee chair for Labor and Transportation. In November 2002, Hatch was elected to the Maine Senate. She served a single term and was replaced by Republican Peter Mills when she and her spouse officially retired after a serious automobile accident. Hatch served multiple terms as a selectman and school board member. She was married to Paul Hatch, who also served in the Maine House and as a Somerset County Commissioner, and had 2 daughters, Paula Hatch and Victoria M. Hatch.

Hatch was a graduate of Penobscot Valley High School in Howland, Maine and the University of Maine.
