= Janet Mills =

Governor of Maine since 2019

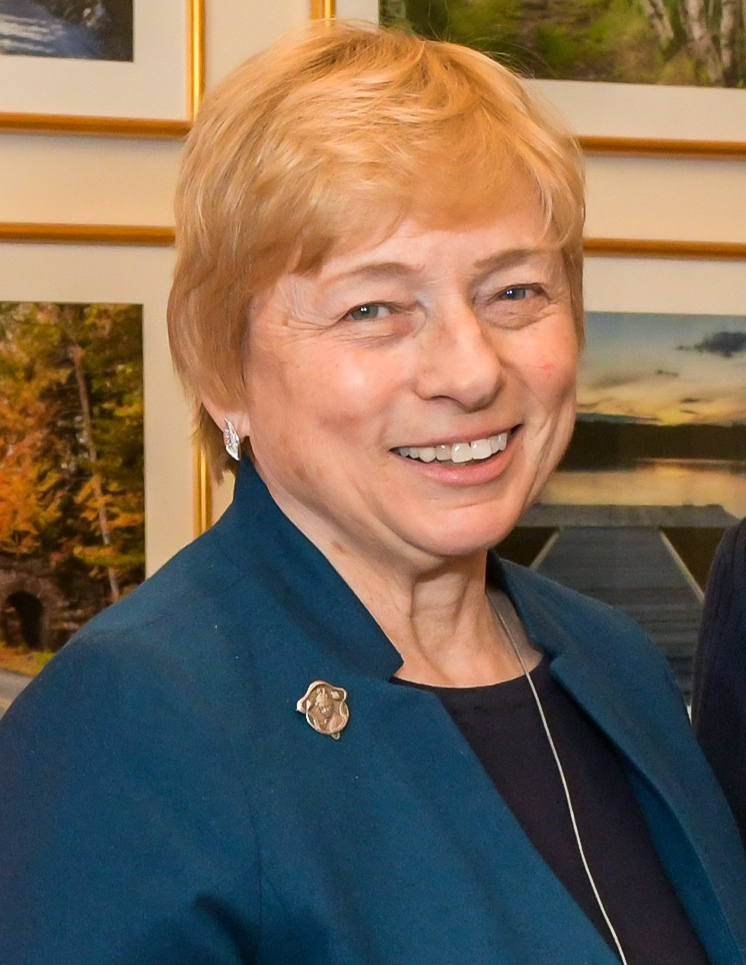
- Mills in 2019

75th Governor of Maine
- Incumbent
- Assumed office January 2, 2019
- Preceded by: Paul LePage

55th and 57th Attorney General of Maine
- In office January 7, 2013 – January 2, 2019
- Governor: Paul LePage
- Preceded by: William Schneider
- Succeeded by: Aaron Frey
- In office January 6, 2009 – January 6, 2011
- Governor: John Baldacci
- Preceded by: G. Steven Rowe
- Succeeded by: William Schneider

Member of the Maine House of Representatives
- In office December 4, 2002 – January 6, 2009
- Preceded by: Walter Gooley
- Succeeded by: Lance Harvell
- Constituency: 78th district (2002–2004); 89th district (2004–2009)

District Attorney of Androscoggin, Franklin, and Oxford Counties
- In office 1980 – January 1995
- Appointed by: Joseph E. Brennan
- Preceded by: Thomas E. Delahanty II
- Succeeded by: Norman Croteau

Personal details
- Born: Janet Trafton Mills; December 30, 1947 (age 78) Farmington, Maine, U.S.
- Party: Democratic
- Spouse: Stanley Kuklinski (m. 1985; died 2014)
- Relatives: Sumner P. Mills (grandfather); S. Peter Mills Jr. (father); Sumner Mills III (brother)
- Education: Colby College (attended); University of Massachusetts, Boston (BA); University of Maine School of Law (JD)
- Website: Campaign website
- Mills's voice Mills on her style of governing and legislative accomplishments. Recorded September 7, 2022

Janet Trafton Mills (born December 30, 1947) is an American politician and attorney who has served since 2019 as the 75th governor of Maine. She previously served as the 55th and 57th attorney general of Maine and as a member of the Maine House of Representatives. She is a member of the Democratic Party.

Mills was first elected attorney general by the Maine Legislature in 2009 and served until 2011. When Democrats regained control of the legislature, she was elected again in 2013, serving three more two-year terms. In 2018, Mills was elected governor, defeating Republican Shawn Moody and independent Terry Hayes after winning a crowded primary. She was reelected in 2022.

Mills ran for the Democratic nomination in the 2026 United States Senate election in Maine. She later suspended her campaign and was defeated in the Democratic primary by Graham Platner.

== Early life and education ==
Mills was born in Farmington, Maine, on December 30, 1947, the daughter of Katherine Louise (Coffin) and Sumner Peter Mills Jr. Her mother was a schoolteacher and Congregationalist, while her father was an attorney who served as U.S. Attorney for Maine in the 1950s. Mills graduated from Farmington High School in 1965. As a teenager, she spent nearly a year bedridden in a full-body cast due to severe scoliosis, which was corrected surgically.

Mills briefly attended Colby College, before moving to San Francisco, where she worked as a nursing assistant in a psychiatric hospital. In 1970, she earned a BA from the University of Massachusetts Boston. During her time at UMass Boston, Mills traveled through Western Europe and became fluent in French. In 1973, she began attending the University of Maine School of Law, and in 1974 was a summer intern in Washington, D.C., for civil rights attorney Charles Morgan Jr. of the American Civil Liberties Union. Mills received a Juris Doctor degree in 1976, and was admitted to the bar.

== Early political career ==
Mills was appointed as Maine's first female criminal prosecutor by Governor Joe Brennan, and was an assistant attorney general from 1976 to 1980, prosecuting homicides and other major crimes. In 1980, she was elected district attorney for Androscoggin, Franklin and Oxford counties, a position to which she was reelected three times. She was the first woman district attorney in New England. In 1994, Mills was an unsuccessful candidate for the United States Congress in Maine's 2nd congressional district, losing the Democratic primary to John Baldacci.

Mills co-founded the Maine Women's Lobby and was elected to its board of directors in 1998.

In 2000, Mills served as a field coordinator for Bill Bradley's 2000 presidential campaign in Maine. In 2002, she was elected to the Maine House of Representatives. There, she served on the judiciary, criminal justice, and appropriations committees. She was reelected in 2004, 2006, and 2008.

=== Attorney general of Maine ===
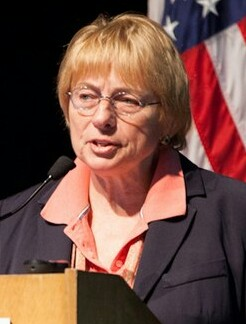
Mills in 2013

Mills was elected to her fourth term when the Joint Convention convened in December 2008 to elect the new attorney general. She became Maine's 55th attorney general on January 6, 2009. When Republicans gained control of the Maine legislature in 2010, Mills was not reelected. In January 2011, she was elected vice chair of the Maine Democratic Party. She joined the law firm Preti Flaherty in February 2011 as a lawyer with the firm's Litigation Group in its Augusta office. After Democrats regained control of the legislature in the 2012 elections, Mills was again chosen as attorney general, resigned as vice chair of the Maine Democratic Party, and took the oath of office as attorney general on January 7, 2013. She was reelected on December 3, 2014, despite the Maine Senate coming under Republican control.

Republican governor Paul LePage opposed Mills for attorney general due to many disputes between them over the legality of some of LePage's policies. On January 28, 2015, he requested the Maine Supreme Judicial Court's opinion as to whether the governor's office needed the attorney general's office's permission to retain outside counsel when the attorney general declines to represent the State in a legal matter. LePage did so after Mills twice declined to represent him in matters she determined had little legal merit, though she approved his requests for outside lawyers. On May 1, 2017, LePage sued Mills, asserting that she had abused her authority by refusing to represent the state in legal matters, or taking a legal view contrary to the LePage administration's.

== Governor of Maine ==
=== Elections ===
==== 2018 ====
On July 10, 2017, Mills announced that she would seek the Democratic nomination for governor of Maine in 2018. One of several candidates in the primary, she won the nomination in June, finishing first after four rounds of ranked-choice voting gave her 54% to her closest competitor's 46%.

In the general election, Mills faced Republican nominee Shawn Moody, independent Maine State Treasurer Terry Hayes, and independent businessman Alan Caron. Endorsed by every major newspaper in Maine and the Boston Globe, buoyed by major ad buys from Democratic political action committees and receiving Caron's endorsement a week before the polls closed, Mills was elected with 50.9% of the vote to Moody's 43.2%. She became Maine's first female governor, the first Maine gubernatorial candidate to be elected with at least 50% of the vote since Angus King in 1998, and the first to win at least 50% of the vote for a first term since Kenneth M. Curtis in 1966. She received over 320,000 votes, more than any governor in the state's history.

Mills's campaign was aided in part by a Democratic super PAC that financed Maine-themed ads meant to attract young voters on social media. Both Mills and outside groups outspent Moody by an average of $15 per vote cast, for a total of $10.7 million.

==== 2022 ====
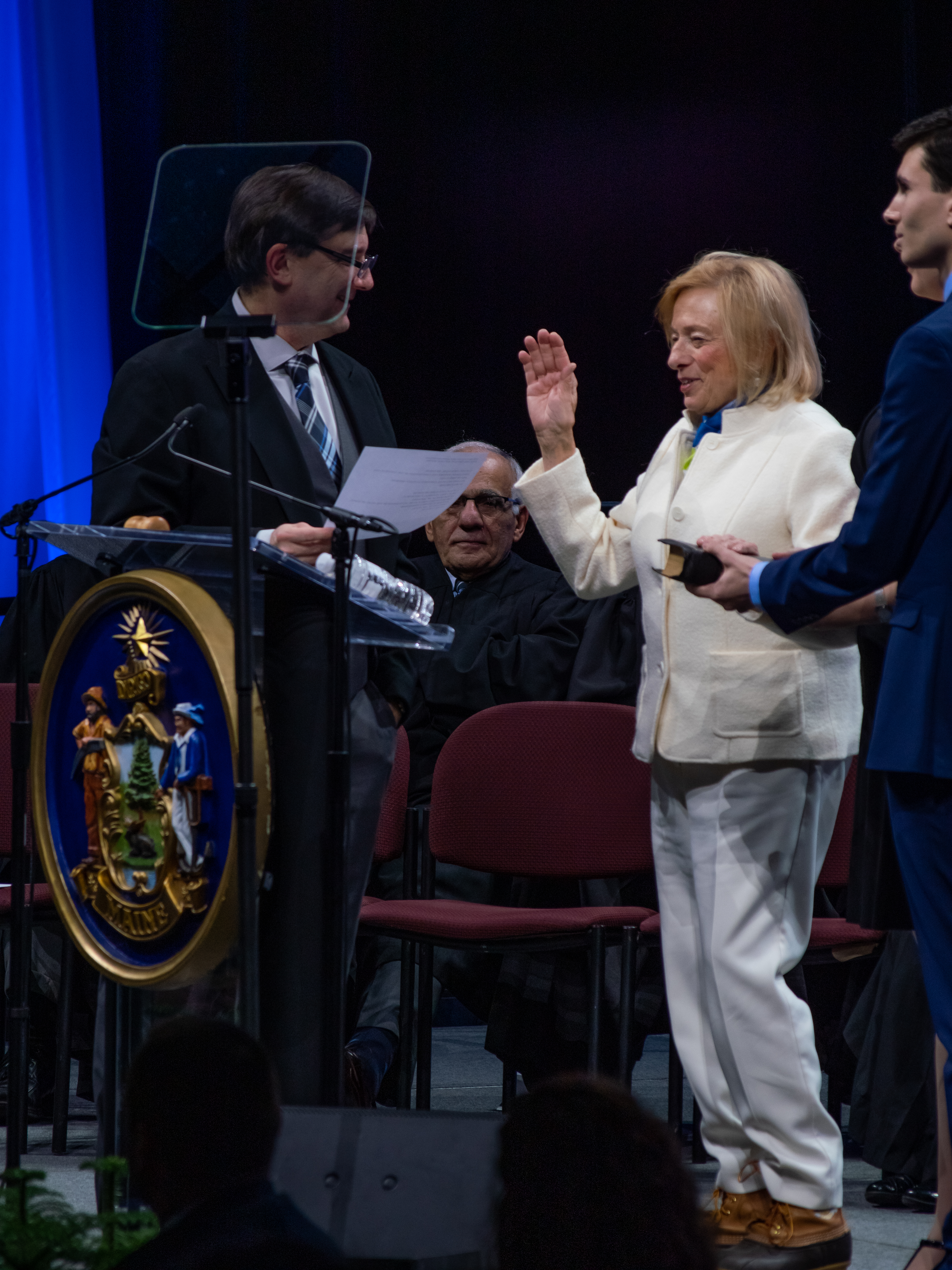
Janet Mills being inaugurated for her second term as Governor of Maine

Mills ran for reelection in 2022. She faced no opposition in the primaries, making her the Democratic nominee. In the general election, Mills defeated the Republican nominee, former governor Paul LePage, securing a second term. She received 376,934 votes, breaking the record for the most votes ever cast for a gubernatorial candidate, set four years earlier.

=== Tenure ===
One of Mills's first acts as governor was to sign an executive order to carry out the expansion of Maine's Medicaid program as called for by a 2017 referendum, something LePage had refused to do. Medicaid expansion was an issue she had campaigned on. Mills also dropped work requirements for Medicaid that LePage requested toward the end of his tenure and that had the Trump administration's approval. She said the work requirements "leave more Maine people uninsured without improving their participation in the workforce".

Mills revived the tradition of Maine governors attending Martin Luther King Jr. Day commemoration events in Portland, doing so in 2019.

In September 2019, United Nations Secretary-General António Guterres asked Mills to speak at the General Assembly on climate change. Mills told world leaders at the UN that she intends to make Maine carbon neutral by 2045. She was the first sitting Maine governor to address the General Assembly.

On June 11, 2021, Mills announced the end of the state of emergency started on March 15, 2020, due to the COVID-19 pandemic. The state of emergency ended on June 30, 2021.

On June 24, 2021, Mills vetoed seven bills, including one that would have closed the Long Creek Youth Development Center, a juvenile prison. The vetoes received harsh rebuke from progressive Democrats in the legislature.

On April 20, 2022, Mills signed into law the Maine state supplemental budget, which included free community college for students of the class of 2020, 2021, 2022 and 2023.

== 2026 U.S. Senate candidacy ==
In December 2022, a month after her reelection as governor, Mills told the Portland Press Herald she did not "plan to run for anything else". In November 2024, the same paper reported that she would not rule out a 2026 campaign for Maine's United States Senate seat held by five-term incumbent Republican Susan Collins. Collins is the only Republican representing a state Donald Trump failed to win in any of his three presidential campaigns.

In August 2025, Axios reported that Democratic Senate leader Chuck Schumer was actively recruiting Mills to challenge Collins. Later that month, Mills told reporters she might decide whether to enter the race in November.

August also saw the campaign launch of Sullivan Harbor Master Graham Platner, running in the Democratic primary on a progressive-populist platform. Platner was endorsed by Senator Bernie Sanders and organized labor. In October, Sanders publicly discouraged Mills from challenging Platner, who had raised over $3.2 million from small donors in the seven weeks since his campaign launch. Axios reported on October 7 that Mills was planning to enter the race by the end of the month and on October 10 that Mills would formally enter the race on October 14, citing a leaked campaign document. The same day, an ActBlue page was launched and a fundraising video was posted to Twitter, but both were deleted.

Mills formally announced her candidacy on October 14. She said she planned to serve only one term if elected. If elected, she would have been the oldest freshman senator (surpassing Peter Welch of Vermont) and the oldest female senator (surpassing Marsha Blackburn of Tennessee) in U.S. history. In a campaign launch video, she highlighted her opposition to Donald Trump with clips of their confrontation in February 2025. Mills was endorsed by Schumer and Catherine Cortez Masto, among other federal lawmakers. After she announced her candidacy, Democratic candidates Dan Kleban and Daira Smith-Rodriguez left the race and endorsed Mills.

Upon announcing her Senate candidacy, Mills moved to the left on key policy issues, supporting a millionaire's tax (which she had previously opposed) and a moratorium on new artificial intelligence data center construction. According to the Wall Street Journal's editorial board, Mills's new policy positions are intended to appeal to the Democratic Party base's "left-wing populism". In April 2026, Mills released ads focusing on Platner's history of controversial online comments.

On April 30, 2026, Mills announced that she was suspending her U.S. Senate campaign, saying she no longer had the financial resources to compete against Platner. Platner was leading in the polls and in fundraising. (Note: Multiple sources:) But Mills never officially withdrew her candidacy, and in late May, she told the Lewiston Sun Journal that she "was still on the ballot", though she did not resume active campaigning. Platner won the primary on June 9, with Mills finishing more than 50 percentage points behind him.

== Political positions ==
=== Abortion ===
Mills has taken steps to expand access to abortion procedures, signing legislation to mandate that both public and private insurance agencies include abortion procedures within the scope of their coverage. After the leak of the 2022 Supreme Court decision in Dobbs v. Jackson Women's Health Organization, Mills reaffirmed her position that "unlike an apparent majority of the Supreme Court, I do not consider the rights of women to be dispensable."

=== AI data centers ===
In April 2026, a bill to establish an 18-month statewide moratorium on AI data centers, the first of its kind in the U.S., was vetoed by Mills. She vetoed the bill because it did not contain a carveout for a planned data center project at the former Androscoggin Paper Mill in Jay that she claimed "enjoys strong local support". In June, the $550 million project was put on hold; the data center company, Sentinel, said it did "not intend to move forward with the project". Environmental groups criticized Mills's veto. Maureen Drouin, executive director for Maine Conservation Voters, wrote in a statement that Mills had "sided with large-scale data center developers over safeguards for Maine people and the environment, leaving communities at risk to higher energy prices and more pollution".

=== Drugs ===
Mills has expressed opposition to the decriminalization of drug possession. In 2019, she signed into law the "Good Samaritan Bill", exempting people who report a drug-related medical emergency, including those experiencing a drug-related medical emergency themselves, from criminal liability for possession.

=== Environmental issues ===
In 2019, Mills signed legislation to ban single-use plastic bags. She also signed into law a ban on the use of styrofoam containers by various industries within the state. This regulation became effective on January 1, 2021.

In 2019, the Central Maine Power Company (CMP) was seeking permission to construct a 145-mile hydropower transmission line from a Hydro-Québec dam system near Beattie Township on the Canadian border to a power grid in Lewiston. The project, known as New England Clean Energy Connect, would be paid for by Massachusetts, and requires a 150-foot-wide, 52-mile-long corridor to be clear cut through the Maine North Woods. Mills initially expressed skepticism of the proposal during her campaign, and it was criticized by environmental groups, but after several months of negotiations, Mills signed an agreement in support of the project, under which CMP agreed to a package giving Maine $258 million in benefits over 40 years.

Mills has also enacted regulatory standards for the water quality on Indigenous reservations used for sustenance fishing.

In 2023, Mills was elected co-chair of the bipartisan Climate Alliance.

=== Filibuster ===
Mills supports retaining the Senate filibuster, the 60-vote threshold for most legislation.

=== Gun control ===
As a state legislator, Mills received A or A+ grades from the National Rifle Association. When she ran for governor in 2018, her grade from the same organization was "F".

During her 2022 reflection campaign, Mills expressed opposition to banning high-capacity magazines and to strengthening background checks. In the wake of the 2023 Lewiston shootings, it was reported that Mills was considering an assault weapons ban.

In 2025, Mills publicly opposed a ballot referendum to implement a red flag law in the state, arguing in favor of Maine's existing "yellow flag" law. If there is reason to believe that someone poses a significant danger to themself or others, the yellow flag law, which is unique to Maine, allows the police to ask a judge to order that person to temporarily relinquish their guns after a mental health examination, whereas red flag laws allow a family member to submit a petition to a judge directly, without needing to first go to the police, and without an evaluation. The referendum proposed the red flag law as a supplement to the yellow flag law, not a replacement for it. In an op-ed for the Portland Press Herald, Mills argued that the proposed law "would create a new, separate and confusing process that will undermine the effectiveness of the law and endanger public safety along with it." In November, the referendum passed with 62.5% of the vote.

=== Healthcare ===
Upon taking office in 2019, Mills implemented voter-approved Medicaid expansion, which extended healthcare access to 90,000 residents by 2022.

=== Education ===
Mills's administration fully funded the state's 55% share of public education costs in 2021, and established universal free school meals for all public school students. Separately, Mills signed legislation making free community college tuition permanent for future high school graduates, after a pilot program.

=== LGBT rights ===
Mills supports LGBT rights. In May 2019, she signed a bill banning conversion therapy, the pseudoscientific practice aimed at changing one's sexual orientation, from being used on minors. A year earlier, the same bill had passed both chambers of the Maine Legislature, but was vetoed by Governor Paul LePage.

Mills supports transgender athletes' participation in sports. On February 21, 2025, during a White House meeting, President Donald Trump threatened to cut federal funding to Maine if Mills did not comply with his executive order to prohibit transgender women from participating in women's sports. Mills told Trump "see you in court", and later released a statement saying "The State of Maine will not be intimidated by the President's threats."

After Mills's exchange with Trump, Maine's Department of Education was unable to access federal funds for a child nutrition program, prompting the state to sue the U.S. Department of Agriculture over the frozen funds. A federal judge ordered the administration to release the funds. On May 2, 2025, the Trump administration agreed to unfreeze the funds, and Maine dropped the lawsuit. But later that month, the Portland Press Herald reported that more than $50 million in federal funding to the University of Maine System had been frozen or terminated.

=== Sports betting and online gambling ===
Mills has expressed opposition to sports betting. In 2020, Mills vetoed a bill to legalize sports betting in the state; the Maine Senate overrode her veto the next month. In April 2026, she signed a bill banning sweepstakes casinos in Maine, and another bill banning the use of credit cards to fund sportsbook and online casino accounts.

=== Tribal relations ===
Mills signed a bill to replace the Columbus Day state holiday with Indigenous People's Day and pledged to work to fill seats on a state-tribal commission that had been left empty under her predecessor. She also signed a bill to establish stricter water quality standards for rivers used by Maine's tribes for sustenance fishing, something long sought by the tribes. It also ended a legal dispute between the tribes and the state, for which Mills as attorney general had defended the state's position.

In 2018, as governor-elect, Mills sent the board of Maine School District 54 a letter urging them to consider Indigenous people's perspectives when deliberating over whether Skowhegan High School should retire its "Indian" mascot, writing that it has become "a source of pain and anguish" for the Native American community. After taking office, she signed a law banning the use of Native American mascots in public schools.

== Personal life ==
In 1985, Mills married real estate developer Stanley Kuklinski and became stepmother to his five daughters. Kuklinski died of a stroke on September 24, 2014. Mills has five grandchildren.

Her brother, Sumner Peter Mills III, father, S. Peter Mills Jr., and grandfather Sumner P. Mills were all members of the Maine Senate and House of Representatives. Peter Mills III ran for governor of Maine in 2006 and 2010, but lost in the primaries both times. He also served as the U.S. Attorney for the District of Maine during the Eisenhower, Nixon, and Ford administrations. Her other siblings include Dora Anne Mills, who was a former Director of Maine Public Health, Director of the Maine Center for Disease Control, and Vice President for Clinical Affairs at the University of New England, and Paul Mills, an attorney and writer for Lewiston's Sun Journal. Another brother, David Mills, died in 2024.

Mills's primary residence is in Farmington, Maine, where she was born and raised. As governor, she resides at the Blaine House, the governor's mansion in Augusta.

== Electoral history ==
1994 Democratic primary for Maine's 2nd congressional district
| Party | Candidate | Votes | % |
|---|---|---|---|
| Democratic | John Baldacci | 12,091 | 27.3 |
| Democratic | James F. Mitchell | 9,993 | 22.6 |
| Democratic | Janet Mills | 7,858 | 17.7 |
| Democratic | James Howaniec | 6,306 | 14.2 |
| Democratic | Mary Cathcart | 5,580 | 12.6 |
| Democratic | Jean Hay Bright | 2,043 | 4.6 |
| Democratic | Shawn T. Hallisley | 413 | 0.9 |

2002 Maine House of Representatives election, District 78
| Party | Candidate | Votes | % |
|---|---|---|---|
| Democratic | Janet Mills | 1,504 | 52.6 |
| Republican | Lance E. Harvell | 1,356 | 43.2 |

2004 Maine House of Representatives election, District 89
| Party | Candidate | Votes | % |
|---|---|---|---|
| Democratic | Janet Mills | 2,329 | 50.7 |
| Republican | Lance E. Harvell | 2,264 | 49.3 |

2006 Maine House of Representatives election, District 89
| Party | Candidate | Votes | % |
|---|---|---|---|
| Democratic | Janet Mills | 2,202 | 55.7 |
| Republican | Lance E. Harvell | 1,748 | 44.3 |

2008 Maine House of Representatives election, District 89
| Party | Candidate | Votes | % |
|---|---|---|---|
| Democratic | Janet Mills | 3,127 | 66.3 |
| Republican | Keith Edward Mahoney | 1,592 | 33.7 |

2018 Maine gubernatorial Democratic primary
| Party | Candidate | Maximum round | Maximum votes | Share in maximum round | Maximum votes First round votes Transfer votes |
|---|---|---|---|---|---|
| Democratic | Janet Mills | 4 | 63,384 | 54.1% | |
| Democratic | Adam Cote | 4 | 53,866 | 45.9% | |
| Democratic | Betsy Sweet | 3 | 29,944 | 24.4% | |
| Democratic | Mark Eves | 2 | 19,521 | 15.7% | |
| Democratic | Mark Dion | 1 | 5,200 | 4.1% | |
| Democratic | Diane Russell | 1 | 2,728 | 2.2% | |
| Democratic | Donna Dion | 1 | 1,596 | 1.3% | |

2018 Maine gubernatorial election
| Party | Candidate | Votes | % |
|---|---|---|---|
| Democratic | Janet Mills | 320,962 | 50.9 |
| Republican | Shawn Moody | 272,311 | 43.2 |
| Independent | Terry Hayes | 37,268 | 5.9 |

2022 Maine gubernatorial Democratic primary
| Party | Candidate | Votes | % |
|---|---|---|---|
| Democratic | Janet Mills (incumbent) | 74,311 | 100 |

2022 Maine gubernatorial election
| Party | Candidate | Votes | % |
|---|---|---|---|
| Democratic | Janet Mills (incumbent) | 376,934 | 55.7 |
| Republican | Paul LePage | 287,304 | 42.4 |
| Independent | Sam Hunkler | 12,581 | 1.9 |

2026 United States Senate election in Maine Democratic primary
| Party | Candidate | Votes | % |
|---|---|---|---|
| Democratic | Graham Platner | 154,084 | 72.1 |
| Democratic | Janet Mills (withdrawn) | 41,644 | 19.2 |
| Democratic | David Costello | 17,560 | 8.1 |
| Democratic | Andrea LaFlamme (write-in) | 1,114 | 0.5 |
| Total votes | | 216,402 | 100.0 |

== See also ==
- List of female governors in the United States
- List of female state attorneys general in the United States

Legal offices
| Preceded by Steven Rowe | Attorney General of Maine; 2009–2011 | Succeeded by William Schneider |
| Preceded by William Schneider | Attorney General of Maine; 2013–2019 | Succeeded by Aaron Frey |
Party political offices
| Preceded by Mike Michaud | Democratic nominee for Governor of Maine; 2018, 2022 | Succeeded by Hannah Pingree |
Political offices
| Preceded by Paul LePage | Governor of Maine; 2019–present | Incumbent |
U.S. order of precedence (ceremonial)
| Preceded by JD Vance as Vice President | Order of precedence of the United States; Within Maine | Succeeded by Mayor of city in which event is held |
| Preceded by JD Vance as Vice President | Order of precedence of the United States; Within Maine | Succeeded by Otherwise Mike Johnson as Speaker of the House |
| Preceded by Kay Ivey as Governor of Alabama | Order of precedence of the United States; Outside Maine | Succeeded by Mike Kehoe as Governor of Missouri |
