= S. Peter Mills Jr. =

American attorney and politician

Peter Mills

United States Attorney for the District of Maine
- In office September 19, 1969 – January 20, 1977
- President: Richard Nixon; Gerald Ford
- Preceded by: Lloyd P. LaFountain Jr.
- Succeeded by: George J. Mitchell
- In office August 17, 1953 – January 20, 1961
- President: Dwight D. Eisenhower
- Preceded by: Alton A. Lessard
- Succeeded by: Alton A. Lessard

Member of the Maine Senate from the 21st district
- In office January 4, 1967 – September 19, 1969
- Preceded by: Sidney D. Maxwell
- Succeeded by: Joseph F. Holman

Member of the Maine House of Representatives from Farmington
- In office January 1, 1947 – January 5, 1949
- Preceded by: Clarence Crosby
- Succeeded by: Jarvis L. Tyler
- In office January 4, 1939 – January 6, 1943
- Preceded by: Herbert Mosher
- Succeeded by: Clarence Crosby

Personal details
- Born: Sumner Peter Mills Jr. August 26, 1911 Farmington, Maine, U.S.
- Died: September 22, 2001 (aged 90) Farmington, Maine, U.S.
- Party: Republican
- Spouse: Katherine Coffin (m. 1941; div. 1975)
- Children: 5, including Peter and Janet
- Parent: Sumner P. Mills (father)
- Education: Colby College (AB); Boston University (LLB)

Military service
- Branch/service: United States Navy; Naval Reserve
- Years of service: 1941-1945
- Rank: Captain
- Battles/wars: World War II; American theater; Pacific theater; Battle of Leyte Gulf

Sumner Peter Mills Jr. (August 26, 1911 – September 22, 2001) was an American attorney and politician from Maine. He was the father of Governor Janet Mills and State Senator Sumner Peter Mills III.

== Early life and education ==
Mills was born on August 26, 1911, in Farmington, Maine, to Sumner P. Mills and Flora Alice (née Pearson) Mills. He graduated from Farmington High School in 1929. He then graduated from Hebron Academy in 1930, Colby College in 1934, and Boston University School of Law in 1937.

== Career ==
In 1941, he joined the Navy, as a gunnery sergeant on a carrier escort. His crew won the Battle of Leyte Gulf. He would then go into the reserves when the war ended and eventually retired as a Captain.

He served in the Maine House of Representatives from 1939 to 1943 and 1947 to 1949. He later served in the Maine Senate from 1967 to 1969. During his time in the Senate, he spearheaded an effort to end discrimination in regards to state liquor and food licenses. This was an issue specifically at a Portland professional club with anti-semitic practices. He also helped to pass a consumer loan bill to end abuses by loan companies.

From 1953 to 1961 and from 1969 to 1977 he served as the US Attorney for the District of Maine under Presidents Eisenhower, Nixon and Ford. Mills served as personal attorney for Wilhelm Reich before becoming U.S. Attorney and ultimately prosecuting him despite the apparent conflict of interest.

== Personal life ==
Mills married Katherine Coffin on June 30, 1941 in Bangor, Maine. They later divorced in December 1975.

They had 5 children including, Sumner Peter Mills III, former Maine state senator, David P. Mills, Janet Mills, former Maine Attorney General and later Governor of Maine, Paul H. Mills and Dr. Dora Anne Mills, former Director of Maine Public Health. Sumner Mills III married Nancy D. Mills, Superior Court Justice.

Mills died on September 22, 2001 in Farmington.
