= William Schneider (politician) =

American politician (born 1959)

Bill Schneider

56th Attorney General of Maine
- In office January 7, 2011 – January 7, 2013
- Governor: Paul LePage
- Preceded by: Janet Mills
- Succeeded by: Janet Mills

Member of the Maine House of Representatives from the 85th district
- In office December 2, 1998 – December 4, 2002
- Preceded by: William E. Bodwell II
- Succeeded by: Michael A. Vaughan

Personal details
- Born: William Joseph Schneider; April 25, 1959 (age 67) Syracuse, New York, U.S.
- Party: Republican
- Spouse: Barbara
- Education: U.S. Military Academy (BS); University of Maine (JD)
- Profession: Lawyer

Military service
- Allegiance: United States
- Branch/service: United States Army
- Years of service: 1977–1986
- Rank: Captain

William Joseph Schneider (born April 25, 1959) is a Maine politician and lawyer. Schneider was elected the attorney general of Maine by the State Legislature following its takeover by the Republican Party in the election of 2010, and served until 2013. He is a retired United States Army officer. In March 2012, he announced his candidacy for the Republican nomination for U.S. Senate, seeking to replace retiring Republican Olympia Snowe, but was unsuccessful.

== Life and career ==
He was born in Syracuse, New York and entered into the U.S. Army in 1977. He served in South Korea and joined the Green Berets. He was permanently disabled in an automobile accident in 1985 in Fort Devens, Massachusetts. In 1990, Schneider enrolled at the University of Maine School of Law and eventually worked in the Cumberland County District Attorney's office.

In 1998, Schneider ran for and won a seat in the Maine House of Representatives, representing his hometown of Durham and portions of Brunswick and Lisbon. He was re-elected in 2000 and chosen the Assistant Republican Leader until 2002.

As Attorney General of Maine, Schneider joined other Attorneys General in challenging the constitutionality of the Affordable Care Act.

Maine Republicans nominated Schneider to serve a second term after the 2012 elections, but the newly elected Democratic legislature selected the previous holder of the position, Janet Mills, to serve again. After his term ended, Governor Paul LePage hired Schneider as the deputy director of the Office of Policy and Management.

On February 7, 2014, Gov. LePage nominated Schneider for a District Court judgeship. His nomination was unanimously confirmed by the Maine Senate on March 18, 2014.

Legal offices
Preceded by Janet Mills	Maine Attorney General; 2011–2013	Succeeded by Janet Mills
