= Sumner P. Mills =

American politician (1874–1956)

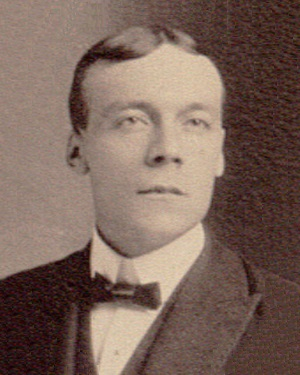
- Official portrait, 1903

Member of the Maine Senate from the 14th district
- In office January 4, 1905 – January 6, 1909 Serving with Edward S. Clark (1905–1907); Luere B. Deasy (1907–1909)
- Preceded by: Albert R. Buck
- Succeeded by: William Ayer Walker
- Constituency: Hancock County

Member of the Maine House of Representatives from the Deer Isle, Stonington, Sedgwick, Isle au Haut, and Eagle Island district
- In office January 7, 1903 – January 4, 1905
- Preceded by: Elmer P. Spofford
- Succeeded by: Rufus E. Hagerthy

Personal details
- Born: Sumner Peter Mills; February 6, 1874 Deer Isle, Maine, U.S.
- Died: December 18, 1956 (aged 82) Farmington, Maine, U.S.
- Party: Republican
- Spouse: Flora Alice Pearson (m. 1905)
- Children: 3, including S. Peter Jr.
- Education: Boston University
- Occupation: Lawyer; journalist; politician

Sumner Peter Mills (February 6, 1874 – December 18, 1956) was an American politician, who served in the Maine House of Representatives and Maine Senate.

== Life ==
Mills was born to Peter Mills and Margaret Mills (née Hamblen) on February 6, 1874, in Stonington, Maine. He graduated from Kent Hills School and Boston University. He started practicing law in 1904. He studied under Charles E. Littlefield, a member of the US House, former Maine Attorney General and Maine Speaker of the House.

He was named after US Senator Charles Sumner. Sumner was a Senator from Massachusetts and an anti-slavery activist. He was beaten with a cane by Senator Preston Brooks, from South Carolina, for his anti-slavery speech, and nearly died.

He married Flora Alice Pearson on July 5, 1905, at her parents' house in Farmington. They had two sons, a daughter and five grandchildren.

He served for Hancock County in the Maine House of Representatives from 1903 to 1905 and Maine Senate from 1907 to 1909.

He wrote for the Lewiston Journal and Franklin Journal. He also served on the Franklin County Draft Board during the First World War. He taught at a school in Stonington. He assisted in getting the Franklin County Hospital established and built and would serve on the Board of Directors.

He died on December 18, 1959, in Farmington. Flora died on May 17, 1964, in Farmington.

He was the father of S. Peter Mills Jr., who served in the Maine Senate, the Maine House of Representatives and as US Attorney for the District of Maine under Presidents Eisenhower, Nixon and Ford. His grandchildren include S. Peter Mills III, who also served in the Maine House and Senate, and Janet Mills, who has served as Maine's Governor and Attorney General.
