= Paul LePage =

American politician (born 1948)

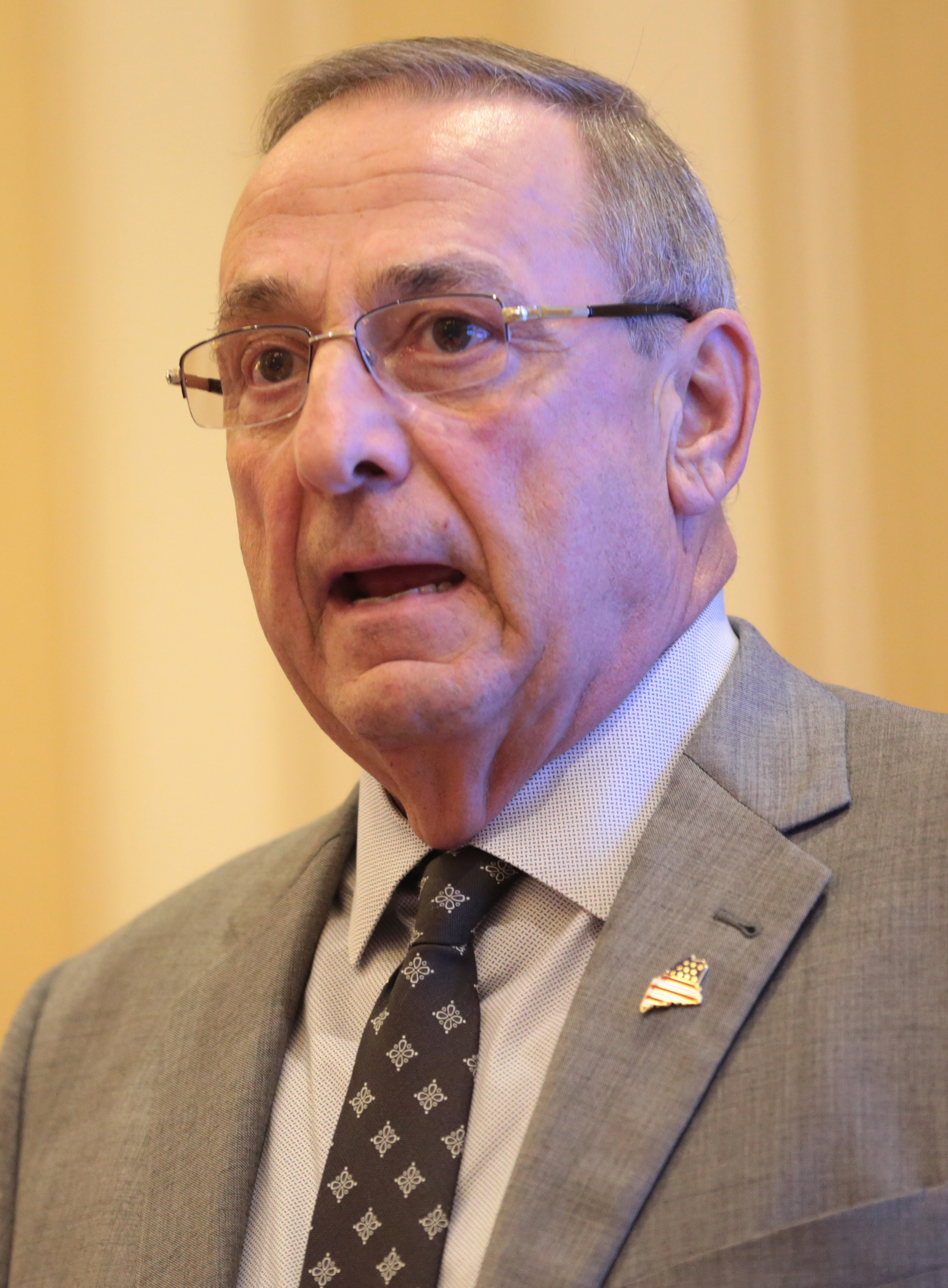
- LePage in 2017

Member-elect of the U.S. House of Representatives from Maine's 2nd district
- Assuming office January 3, 2027
- Succeeding: Jared Golden

74th Governor of Maine
- In office January 5, 2011 – January 2, 2019
- Preceded by: John Baldacci
- Succeeded by: Janet Mills

50th Mayor of Waterville
- In office January 6, 2004 – January 5, 2011
- Preceded by: Nelson Madore
- Succeeded by: Dana Sennett

Personal details
- Born: Paul Richard LePage; October 9, 1948 (age 78) Lewiston, Maine, U.S.
- Party: Republican
- Spouses: Sharon Crabbe (m. 1971; div. 1980); Ann DeRosby (m. 1984)
- Children: 4
- Education: Husson University (BS); University of Maine (MBA)
- Website: Campaign website; Governor archives

Paul Richard LePage (/ləˈpeɪdʒ/; born October 9, 1948) is an American businessman and politician who is the U.S. representative-elect for Maine's 2nd congressional district. A member of the Republican Party, he previously served as the 74th governor of Maine from 2011 to 2019 and as the 50th mayor of Waterville from 2004 to 2011.

In 2010, LePage was elected governor, winning with 37% of the vote in a race with four major candidates. In 2014, he was re-elected in a less crowded election with 48% of the vote. During his tenure as governor, LePage made extensive use of his veto power, vetoing 652 bills as of July 2018 – more than all of Maine's governors over the previous 100 years combined. LePage was known for making controversial remarks on various issues. LePage was unable to seek re-election to a third consecutive term due to term limits laws in Maine, and was succeeded by Democrat Janet Mills. After initially retiring from politics, he mounted an unsuccessful bid for governor in 2022.

In 2025, LePage announced his candidacy for Maine's 2nd congressional district for the 2026 election, which he narrowly won, defeating Democrat Matthew Dunlap.

== Early life and education ==
LePage was born in Lewiston, Maine, on October 9, 1948. The eldest son of 18 children of Theresa (née Gagnon) and Gerard LePage, both of French Canadian descent, he grew up speaking French in an impoverished home with an abusive father who was a mill worker. His father drank heavily and terrorized the children, and his mother was too intimidated to stop him. His brother Moe later said of their father, "He was an evil man."

At age 11, after his father beat him and broke his nose, LePage ran away from home and lived on the streets of Lewiston. At times, he stayed in horse stables and at a strip joint. He was homeless for two years before two families took him in. LePage was the only person among his parents and siblings to graduate from the eighth grade. He graduated from Lewiston High School in 1967.

LePage performed poorly on the SAT verbal section because English was his second language. Politician Peter Snowe, who had befriended LePage, persuaded Husson College to give LePage the test in French. LePage was later accepted. He graduated from Husson in 1971 with a bachelor's degree in business administration, and earned a Master of Business Administration degree from the University of Maine in 1975.

== Early business and political career ==
After graduating from college, LePage began his business career working from 1972 to 1979 for a lumber company in New Brunswick, Canada, that was owned by his first wife's family. He subsequently worked for Scott Paper Company in Winslow, Maine.

In the 1980s, LePage founded the management consulting firm LePage & Kasevich Inc., which provided services to struggling businesses. In 1996, he was hired as general manager of Marden's, a Maine-based discount retail chain.

=== Waterville City Council ===
LePage entered local politics when he was elected to the Waterville City Council in 1997, serving until 2002. He was reelected to the council in 1999.

=== Mayor of Waterville ===
In 2003, LePage sought the office of mayor of Waterville, running against Democratic candidate Charles Kellenberger and independent Daniel Dufour. LePage won the election with 40 percent of the vote.

LePage took office as mayor on January 6, 2004, succeeding Nelson Madore. As mayor, he implemented administrative reforms, reduced municipal taxes, and increased the city's reserve fund from $1 million to $10 million. During his tenure, he had policy disagreements with Democratic Governor John Baldacci on issues including immigration enforcement and state tax policy.

In 2008, LePage was reelected mayor, defeating Democratic challenger Rosemary Winslow by a margin of 51 percent to 49 percent. He resigned from the mayoral position in January 2011 upon taking office as governor.

== Governor of Maine ==
=== Elections ===
==== 2010 ====
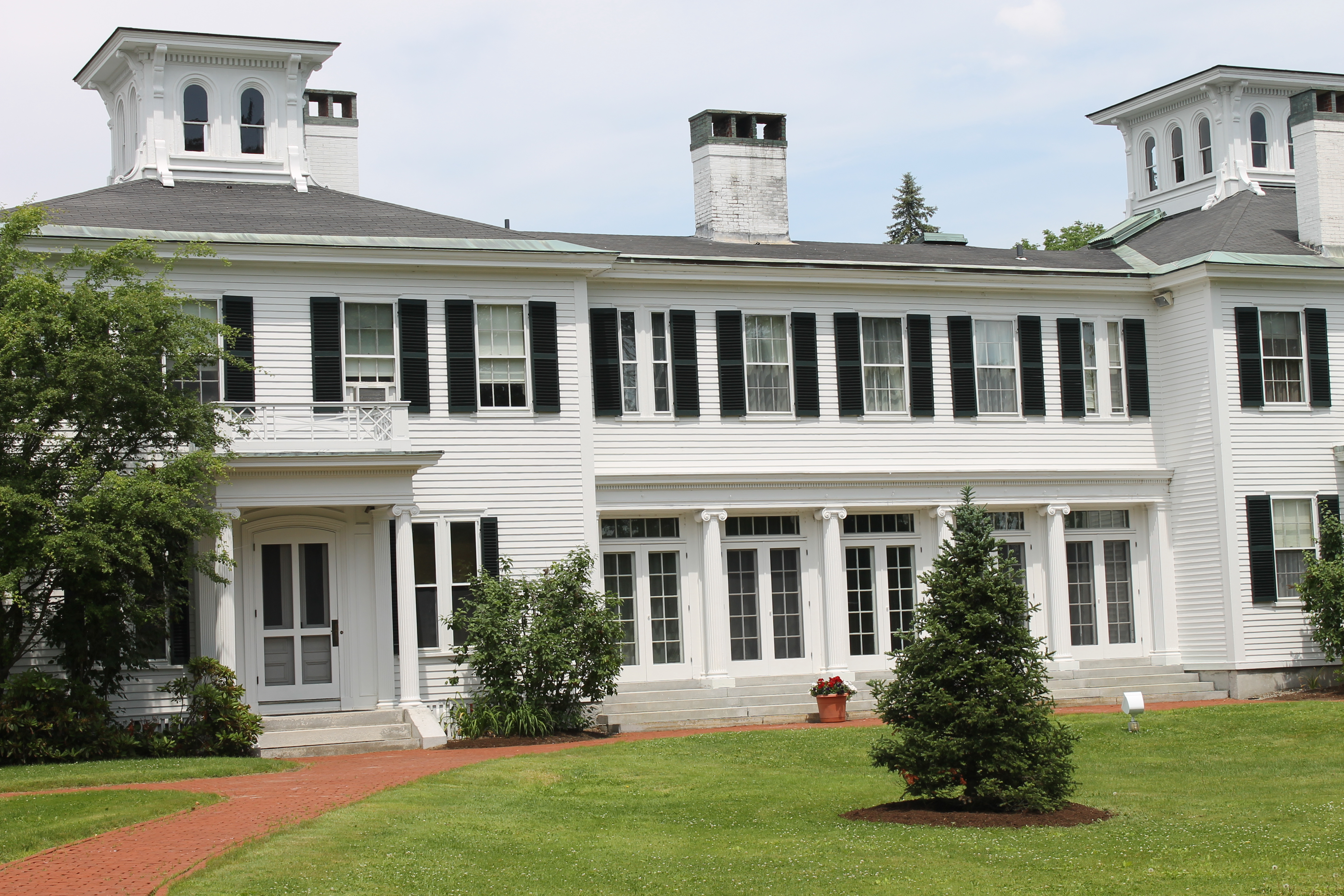
Like previous governors, LePage resided in The Blaine House across from the State Capitol.

On September 22, 2009, LePage announced that he would be seeking the 2010 Republican nomination for governor of Maine. He won 38% of the vote in a seven-way primary election, despite being outspent ten-to-one by his closest challenger. John Morris, LePage's campaign chief-of-staff, credited LePage's win with a campaign strategy (devised by chief strategist Brent Littlefield) that he referred to as the "three onlys" theme before the June primary election. This theme focused on particular aspects of LePage's biography that supposedly set him apart from the other candidates. These were, according to Morris, LePage "was the only candidate who had a compelling life story, ... the only candidate who had a successful experience as a chief executive officer of a government entity, ... the only candidate who was the executive of a prosperous Maine business."

In the general election, LePage was backed by local Tea Party activists and faced Democratic state senator Libby Mitchell, and three independents – Eliot Cutler, Shawn Moody, and Kevin Scott. During the campaign, he told an audience that when he became governor, they could expect to see newspaper headlines stating, "LePage Tells Obama to Go to Hell". He was subsequently criticized by Libby Mitchell's campaign as being disrespectful towards the office of the president.

With 94% of precincts reporting on the day after the election, the Bangor Daily News declared LePage the winner, carrying 38.1% of the votes. Independent Cutler was in second place with 36.7% of the votes (fewer than 7,500 votes behind LePage), while Democrat Mitchell was a distant third with 19%. Moody and Scott had 5% and 1%, respectively. LePage was the first popularly elected, Franco-American governor of Maine and the first Republican since John R. McKernan Jr.'s re-election in 1990. In his victory speech, LePage promised he would shrink government, lower taxes, decrease business regulation, and put "Maine people ahead of politics".

==== 2014 ====
On May 7, 2013, LePage stated that it was likely that he would seek re-election in 2014. He had already filed paperwork to form a campaign committee in August 2011 to be able to hold fundraisers to raise campaign funds. On June 21, 2013, when asked if he was concerned about hurting his re-election campaign, he replied, "Who said I'm running?", and, that "everything was on the table"—including entering the race for Maine's Second Congressional District; retiring; or "going back to Marden's to stock shelves". He later backed off the reference to entering a congressional run, but stated that he would have a family meeting to discuss the possibility of him not seeking re-election, citing the passage of a 2013–2014 budget by the legislature—in override of his veto of it—as the type of devastating mistake that Maine could not recover from. At a fundraiser with former Florida governor Jeb Bush on July 2, he told supporters that he was indeed running for re-election.

At 12:04 AM on November 5, the Bangor Daily News declared that Paul LePage had won re-election to a second term, defeating Democratic Congressman Mike Michaud and independent candidate Eliot Cutler. He received 48.2% of the vote.

=== Tenure ===
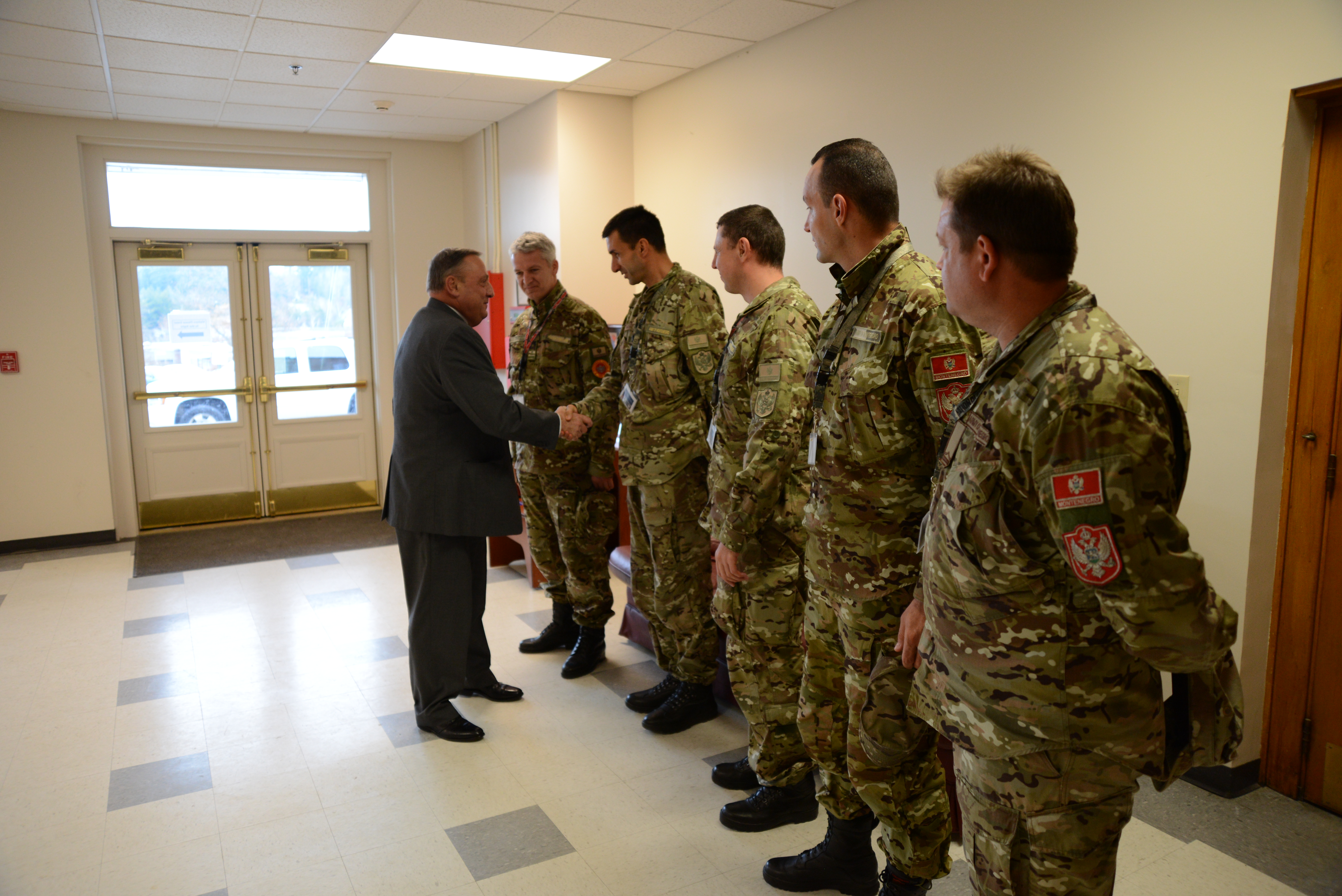
LePage meeting with the Montenegrin Cyber team in November 2013

LePage is known for his bombastic and off-the-cuff remarks that have at times generated controversy. He has cited the fact that French was his first language as a reason for his controversial statements. His comments regarding women, African Americans, Native Americans, the poor, local colleges and universities, and government activities have generated headlines. At the beginning of his term as governor, he was criticized for refusing either to attend Martin Luther King Jr. Day events in Portland or Orono or to meet with Maine representatives of the National Association for the Advancement of Colored People (NAACP), telling the press the group could "kiss my butt". His actions were called "astonishing and troubling" by civil rights group leaders and local newspapers.

In February 2011, LePage spoke on a local TV news program saying he hoped to repeal the Maine ban of Bisphenol A, voted for unanimously by the Maine Board of Environmental Protection, because "there hasn't been any science that identifies that there is a problem." On March 28, it was reported that the LePage administration had dropped its opposition to the new BPA regulations. After a unanimous vote in the Senate, the Maine legislature on April 22 passed a bill to ban the use of BPA in beverage containers. LePage refused to sign the bill, but it became law without his signature.

On March 23, 2011, LePage sparked protests when he announced that he planned to remove a large mural depicting the history of the state's labor movement from the lobby of the Maine Department of Labor offices. Despite protests, on March 28 it was disclosed that the murals had been removed over the weekend. The Portland Museum of Art issued a statement that said LePage's decision has tarnished the state's reputation as a haven for artists. His actions sparked furthered backlash, and lawsuits were brought forward regarding the murals.

On April 27, 2012, LePage stated that Maine's "middle management" was corrupt, sparking backlash from worker groups and Maine politicians. Maine State Employees Association President Ginette Rivard responded to the criticism of state workers by stating, "For LePage to call them 'corrupt' is baseless and insulting to every public worker who has dedicated their lives to making Maine a great place to live, work and raise a family."

In his second year in office, LePage made a proposal to allow public funds to go to religious schools; the proposal was found unconstitutional by the Maine Supreme Judicial Court. He later drew negative publicity for urging any commission members who were not up to meeting the state's expectations to resign. On July 25, 2012, LePage and his Commissioner of Education, Stephen Bowen, unveiled a second round of reform proposals which issued that domestic students were getting "poorer" educational practice, regarding required examinations for admission. His proposals were criticized by the Maine Education Association, Maine Democrats, and many college students attending school out of state who stated they did not experience the poor treatment LePage purported.

On July 8, 2012, LePage said, while discussing the Patient Protection and Affordable Care Act, that the Internal Revenue Service (IRS) was "the new Gestapo" due to their role in enforcing the law. Some Democrats, Jewish groups, and unions levied heavy criticism towards LePage over his statement, and demanded an apology. Prominent members of LePage's own party were generally less critical. Maine Republican Party chairman Charlie Webster felt that "most regular people knew what he meant." A day later, LePage issued a written statement stating that his intent was not to "insult anyone, especially the Jewish community, or to minimize the fact that millions of people were murdered," and that his message had been "clouded" by his use of the word "Gestapo". In response, both Maine Senator Roger Katz, who is Jewish, and U.S. Senator Susan Collins stated they were pleased LePage had backed away from his comments.

LePage was the first Maine governor to use social media to promote the annual State of the State address, when he used Twitter to send several tweets previewing his February 5, 2013, speech.

On March 21, 2013, LePage summoned a dozen state employees of the Bureau of Unemployment to the Blaine House for a luncheon to discuss the state's unemployment compensation hearing and appeals process. Although LePage described the meeting as "cordial", the workers described it as pressuring and used to intimidate them to give more rulings on unemployment claim appeals in favor of businesses, as well as to state that they were doing their jobs poorly. LePage called the accusation "outrageous" and said that David Webbert, the president of the Maine Employment Lawyers Association who made the allegation, was making it up. The situation spurred statewide backlash including a federal investigation of the alleged intimidation, which concluded that LePage's administration improperly acted with "what could be perceived as a bias toward employers".

On May 23, 2013, LePage announced that he would move his office out of the Maine State Capitol and work from The Blaine House due to what he called efforts by majority Democrats in the Legislature to censor his speech. This included the refusal of the Appropriations Committee to allow him to address them on May 19, and later being asked to obtain permission from the Legislative Council to have a TV outside of his office displaying the number of days since his budget was proposed. Senate President Justin Alfond criticized LePage's announcement by saying such behavior was "embarrassing and not helpful to getting things done for the people of Maine." On June 20, 2013, after speaking at a rally opposed to the bipartisan biennial budget proposal voted out of the Legislature, LePage responded to criticism from Democratic Assistant Majority Leader Senator Troy Jackson that LePage was "delusional" to say Democratic leaders were unwilling to negotiate with him. LePage stated that Jackson "claims to be for the people but he's the first one to give it to the people without providing Vaseline." He further stated people like Jackson, a logger by trade, "ought to go back into the woods and cut trees and let someone with a brain come down here and do some good work," along with other negative personal remarks. The remark about Vaseline was heavily criticized by public figures on all sides, including Democratic House Speaker Mark Eves, who called the comment "obscene" and criticized its being on the evening news when children could hear it.

LePage is known for his dislike of Maine newspapers, once telling students at a school that "Reading newspapers in the state of Maine is like paying somebody to tell you lies." While telling the editorial board of The Portsmouth Herald he did not want their endorsement for reelection, he said that newspapers were against him and "It's futile. There's a bias in the press I can't change." After a three-part report published by the Portland Press Herald, Kennebec Journal, and Morning Sentinel which alleged his Department of Environmental Protection commissioner was favoring former clients, he ordered his administration to not grant interviews to reporters of those newspapers or cooperate with their information requests. The order did not seem to extend to all state agencies, as the Department of Public Safety's spokesman said he had been given no such instructions. Nine days after the U.S. federal government shutdown on October 1, 2013, LePage declared a civil emergency in Maine ending 17 days later. He said that the declaration was necessary in order to cope with the loss of federally funded positions during the shutdown, such as by transferring state-funded personnel to functions originally carried out by the federally funded personnel to minimize layoffs. His move to do so was met with widespread negative criticism, and was labeled as an unnecessary "overreach of power".

On June 30, 2014, the website Talking Points Memo reported that LePage had met eight times with members of the sovereign citizen movement between January and September 2013. According to participants, the sovereign citizens group used these meetings, some of which lasted nearly three hours, to inform LePage of their beliefs, which include assertions that the U.S. dollar and Maine state courts are illegal, that Maine Senate President Justin Alfond and Maine House Speaker Mark Eves are guilty of treason and should be executed, and that the U.S. government and the United Nations are planning for a war against Americans. LePage set up a meeting between Kennebec County sheriff Randall Liberty and the sovereign citizens group and asked Liberty to take the group's concerns to the state attorney general.

As governor, LePage attempted to roll back child labor laws, proposing a $5.25 subminimum wage. He also proposed that children aged 12 and up should be able to work. In a speech at the 73rd annual Maine Agricultural Trades Show, he stated his view supporting child labor adding "If the revenues go up, I can go golfing. If not, I'm going to have to continue working 80 hours a week."

As Governor, LePage issued 642 vetoes, which broke the record of 118 set by Governor James B. Longley and was more than all his predecessors since 1917 combined. Most of LePage's vetoes were issued after Democrats regained control of the Legislature from the Republicans in 2013.

In the 2015 session of the Legislature, LePage promised to veto every bill sponsored by a Democrat, regardless of its merits, in retaliation for the rejection of his proposal for a constitutional amendment referendum to eliminate Maine's income tax. LePage later expanded his veto threat to all bills sponsored by all legislators in order to force needing a 2/3 vote on them for passage. He stated that he feels it is the only way he can "get the most representation that I can for the people of the state of Maine" and that Democrats had convinced Republicans to sponsor bills to get around his initial veto threat.

In June 2015, Good Will-Hinckley, a charitable organization for at-risk youths that runs two charter schools, hired Democratic House Speaker Mark Eves to be their next president. LePage, however, threatened to withhold $500,000 of state funding for the school if they hired Eves, due to his voting record against charter schools in Maine. LePage's choice to do so was labeled as "blackmail" as well as "political interference". The incident was subject to a federal investigation, but no charges were issued. Some Democrats in the Legislature launched an effort to impeach LePage over this and other matters on January 14, 2016, but the effort was indefinitely postponed, effectively killing it, on a 96–52 vote.

=== Public opinion ===
In 2016, LePage's approval ratings registered at 38%. LePage left office with an approval split of 39–53%. (Note: Survey tracked the final three months of his tenure, from October to December 2018.)

== 2022 gubernatorial campaign ==
LePage unsuccessfully ran for a third non-consecutive term in 2022. LePage had previously indicated his interest in the 2022 election based on the implementation of Maine's Medicaid expansion referendum. On July 5, 2021, he officially announced his candidacy for governor. He was later endorsed by Maine's Republican U.S. Senator, Susan Collins. LePage faced no primary opposition, and was the Republican nominee to run against Mills in the November general election. LePage lost 56% to 42%.

== 2026 U.S. House campaign ==
LePage ran a successful campaign for Maine's 2nd congressional district in the U.S. House of Representatives in 2026. Neither he nor Democratic nominee Matt Dunlap received 50% of the vote in the first round of tabulation, with LePage receiving 49.89% to Dunlap's 48.31%. Therefore, a ranked-choice runoff was triggered. LePage won the maximum round of voting by 1.6 percentage points, receiving 50.8% of the vote to Dunlap's 49.2%. LePage will be sworn into the 120th Congress on January 3, 2027.

== Political positions ==
=== Abortion ===
LePage has opposed abortion. He has appeared at the annual anti-abortion Hands Around the Capitol rally at the Maine State House, first doing so at the 2011 event. In 2022, LePage stated that, if re-elected Governor, he would veto any bill to ban abortion at or before 15 weeks of pregnancy. He said he would not attempt to "reverse" abortion rights in Maine. However, he also stated he still supported restricting abortion.

=== Campaign financing ===
LePage is opposed to the Maine Clean Elections Act, which provides funding for publicly-financed campaigns in Maine without prohibiting private campaign contributions. He proposed eliminating all funding for the act in his 2014–2015 biennial budget and stated his opposition to a proposal to reform the act by increasing the amount of money that would be distributed. He has called such aid "welfare for politicians" and a "scam," saying that "Our democracy is being corrupted by the role of big money in politics."

=== Capital punishment ===
LePage supports the death penalty in cases of the murder of a baby. He stated this view regarding the case of Ethan Henderson, a 10-week-old baby who was allegedly killed by his father. He also has expressed support for giving the death penalty to drug dealers whose drugs cause a fatal overdose. Maine abolished the death penalty in 1887.

=== Donald Trump ===
LePage initially endorsed Chris Christie for the 2016 Republican presidential nomination. After Christie ended his campaign, LePage endorsed Donald Trump. Earlier in February, LePage had urged Republican governors to draft an open letter "to the people" disavowing Trump and his politics.

=== Drug policy ===
LePage supports the idea of the state removing the children of welfare recipients from their homes if the recipients are found to be using illegal drugs and refuse to enter rehab. Current law allows the removal of children only due to neglect and abuse, which can result from drug use, but is not drug use itself.

LePage has expressed opposition to the legalization of marijuana, seeing it as a gateway to more powerful drugs like heroin, but has said that if legalization were approved by referendum, he would honor it. However, in 2018 he vetoed a bill to establish retail sales of cannabis in Maine in accordance with an initiative that voters approved in 2016.

LePage has called for additional Maine DEA agents, judges, and prosecutors to fight drugs. The Maine Legislature approved six additional agents, two prosecutors, and two judges in the 2015–16 state budget, but LePage criticized that as "chump change" and has asked for more. He has criticized legislative Democrats skeptical of his proposals, stating "If I didn't know better, I was a real cynic, I'd think that the Democrats like drug dealers." He has stated he would use the Maine National Guard for drug enforcement if necessary, and has actually done so. He further called for drug traffickers to be put in "super-max" facilities. He has also said, "Everybody in Maine, we have constitutional carry, load up and get rid of the drug dealers," which he clarified meant that an environment should be created that will keep drug dealers away from Maine, not that people should engage in vigilantism.

=== Economy ===
LePage has said that the permitting process to start a business in Maine is too cumbersome and expensive and he will look for ways to make it cheaper and easier. He opposed raising any taxes during his term as governor and supported the creation of a 5% flat tax on all households earning more than $30,000. During the gubernatorial campaign, he also wanted to reduce the auto registration tax by 20% and use the actual sale price rather than MSRP as the tax basis.

LePage has criticized Maine's child labor laws, stating that the minimum work age of 16 without a work permit in Maine "is doing damage to the economy" and that "there is nothing wrong with being a paperboy at 12 years old, or at a store sorting bottles at 12 years old." In an interview with Downeast Magazine, he stated that "I'm all for not allowing a 12-year-old to work 40 hours, but a 12-year-old working eight to 10 hours a week or a 14-year-old working 12 to 15 hours a week is not bad." Citing his own experiences working at that age, he said that these hours should be permitted as it would instill a healthy work ethic in children. LePage has proposed allowing businesses to pay child workers a training wage of $5.25 an hour, loosening time-based requirements for children working during the school year, and streamlining the process for children to obtain a work permit by removing school superintendents from the process in the summer, all of which did not pass the Legislature.

LePage opposes the expansion of casino gambling in Maine, believing that any economic benefit to additional casinos would come at the expense of Maine's existing casinos. LePage has also said that if he was sent a bill to abolish the Maine State Lottery, he would sign it, saying it "absolutely" targets the poor.

LePage has vetoed at least one bill for increasing Maine's minimum wage, believing that wages should be increased by creating an environment for higher-paying jobs in Maine through lowering energy costs and lowering taxes. He has supported preventing municipalities like Portland from having local minimum wages higher than the state's. In response to a citizen initiated referendum to raise Maine's minimum wage to $12 an hour by 2020, he stated that he supported a competing proposal to raise it to $10 an hour as less harmful to businesses who would have to pay the full minimum wage to tipped employees under the referendum.

=== Education ===
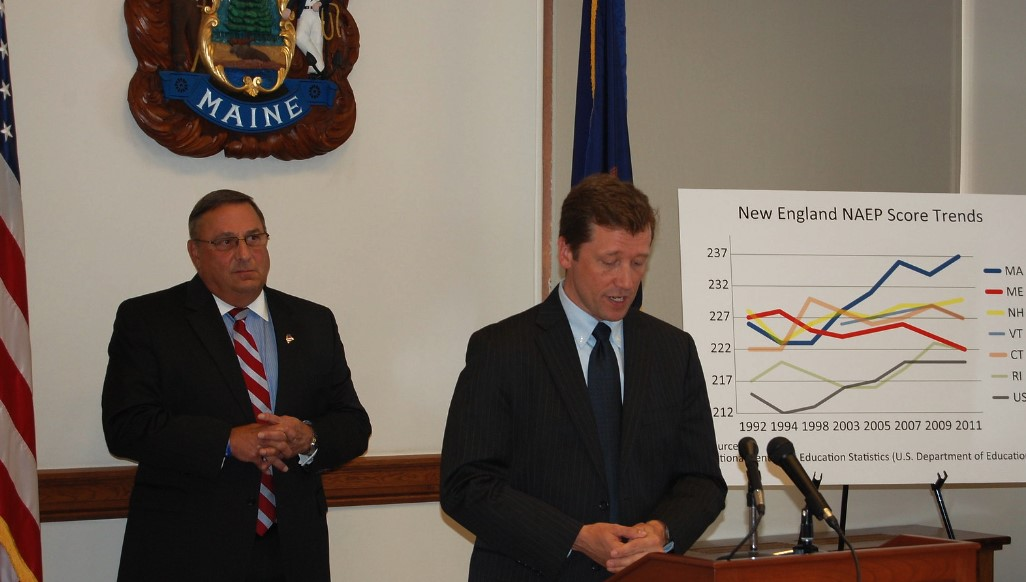
Governor LePage with an Education Department official in June 2011

LePage supported a school voucher system and structuring pay to reward teachers for performance. He has stated that curriculum should be determined by local school boards.

LePage signed a bill to bring Maine in alignment with the Common Core State Standards Initiative on April 1, 2011, making the state the 42nd to do so. By 2013, however, LePage expressed opposition to the standards, citing fears of a federal takeover of education and student privacy concerns. On September 4, he issued an executive order prohibiting the Maine Department of Education from implementing any federal education standards, from applying for grants where implementing such standards is a condition of the grant, and from sharing personal student information with the federal government.

On November 18, 2013, LePage pledged $10,000 from his official contingency account to a program run by Portland-based LearningWorks for helping new immigrants learn the English language. LePage met with Somali immigrants in Lewiston to make the announcement, and discussed other difficulties immigrants had in obtaining education and employment, which LePage related to given his life with French as his first language.

=== Environment ===
LePage rejects the overwhelming scientific consensus on climate change, which states that climate change is dangerous and primarily human-caused. According to Democratic state senator Brownie Carson, during LePage's time in office "he not only didn't care about the environment, he was actively hostile toward it". LePage supported increased use of fossil fuels, vetoed clean energy bills, sought to eliminate environmental regulations, was the lone Atlantic coast governor to promote offshore drilling, refused to issue voter-approved conservation bonds, attempted to tax protected forestland and/or open it to development, and refused to put up signs to direct tourists to the Katahdin Woods and Waters National Monument designated by former president Barack Obama.

In February 2011, LePage proposed zoning 10 million acres (40,000 km^{2}) of northern Maine for development, repealing laws that require manufacturers to take back recyclable goods for disposal, and other sweeping changes to environmental laws. In a statement LePage said, "Job creation and investment opportunities are being lost because we do not have a fair balance between our economic interests and the need to protect the environment."

LePage has claimed, despite an abundance of scientific research to the contrary, that climate change may be beneficial. He has argued that the opening of the Northern Passage through the melting of arctic ice could benefit Maine. "Everybody looks at the negative effects of global warming, but with the ice melting, the Northern Passage has opened up. So maybe, instead of being at the end of the pipeline, we're now at the beginning of a new pipeline."

=== Energy ===
LePage has criticized wind power and in particular the large-scale expansion of installed capacity mandated by Maine's 2008 Wind Energy Act and wind energy's large role in the state's Renewable Portfolio Standard. LePage argues that the policies are a major cause of the relatively high cost per kW of electricity in Maine—34% above the national average.

LePage believes that government policies should consider the effect of greenhouse gases, but opposes regulations. He has said he would support shallow-water offshore drilling in Maine waters, but not deep-water drilling, which he considers more hazardous. He has stated that some requirements for environmental impact studies should be reduced or weakened because they frequently impose undue burden on economic activity. In June 2012, LePage criticized the removal of the Great Works dam on the Penobscot River in Old Town to enhance the migration of fish in the river, despite the project leading to no loss of electricity generation, calling the removal of hydroelectric dams in general "irresponsible". In August 2012, he was reported saying that he supported efforts to invest in renewable energy, though only ones he thought were both economically feasible and effective: "There are renewables that work," he said. "Like hydro, hydro and more hydro." In the same report, he said that wind could not support the baseload energy needs of the state, calling it a "boutique energy source."

=== Government reform ===
LePage has stated that the size of state government is likely too large and that he would probably seek to reduce the number of state employees.

He has called for the abolition of term limits for Maine legislators, who are limited to four consecutive two-year terms, saying that they have resulted in a legislature full of young people with "firm agendas" who pass bills that hurt Maine in the long term. He cited former longtime Democratic House Speaker John Martin as an example of how an experienced legislator would be beneficial for Maine.

LePage has been critical of Maine's citizen initiative process, by which citizens can put an issue to referendum, stating that the process should be reformed to return to a "representative government" and that Mainers don't understand what they are voting for on referendum questions. He has expressed support for requiring petition signatures to be gathered in each Maine county and for requiring a greater total number of signatures to qualify an issue for the ballot.

LePage was opposed to efforts to change Maine's voting system from plurality voting to ranked choice voting, even though it was ruled unconstitutional with regards to elections to state offices.

=== Health care ===
LePage called for repeal of the federal Patient Protection and Affordable Care Act, saying he believes it is unconstitutional, and had encouraged Maine's attorney general William Schneider to join the federal lawsuit by other state attorneys general challenging the bill. Upon the United States Supreme Court's ruling upholding the majority of the act, LePage stated that the law was an "enormous tax" and that "Washington, D.C., now has the power to dictate how we, as Americans, live our lives." He later referred to the Internal Revenue Service, which is charged with enforcing the insurance mandate, as "the new Gestapo" and that the "decision has made America less free". He has also compared the ACA with Canada's health care system, stating that Canada rations care and that many Canadians come to the U.S. to get treatment because of it, and that similar rationing here would result in deaths.

He has said that coverage mandates for Maine insurance policies should be pared back because they make insurance policies too expensive. He believes that MaineCare, the state Medicaid program, has too many enrollees and is too easy to qualify for. He vetoed a bill to expand MaineCare under the Affordable Care Act on June 17, 2013, and has criticized efforts by the Legislature to write an expansion bill that will obtain enough votes to override a veto, stating that the Legislature has "no compassion".

On July 3, 2013, LePage pledged $50,000 of his emergency fund to a drug treatment center in Ellsworth. The Open Door Recovery Center provides treatment for clients regardless of their ability to pay.

LePage has stated that he feels there are too many hospitals in Maine, noting that New Hampshire's 1.3 million people have 26 hospitals, while Maine's 1.2 million have 39.

In March 2014, LePage drew national attention related to his opposition to a bill that would allow caregivers, health care professionals and more emergency responders to administer naloxone, a drug which has been used for many years as an antidote for drug overdoses, saying it could raise Medicaid costs and encourage drug addiction. Recently approved by the Food and Drug Administration (FDA), naloxone was formulated to be used both for opioid drug overdoses and for people who have life-threatening drug interactions. Speaking in a statement at the announcement of the approval, the FDA commissioner said that drug overdose deaths are the leading cause of injury death in the United States, largely due to prescription drug overdoses. LePage vetoed a similar bill in 2013. In an interview LePage stated, "I think we need to treat, Let's deal with the treatment, the proper treatment and not say, Go overdose, and oh, by the way, if you do I'll be there to save you. I think we need to deal with the bigger, basic problem of drug addiction, drug trafficking and drug abuse in the state. That's all I'm interested in."

During his tenure as governor, LePage vetoed Medicaid expansion six times. After voters approved a 2017 referendum for expanding Medicaid coverage, LePage refused to implement the program, citing a lack of funding, and expansion advocates sued LePage in response. LePage has said he would rather go to jail than implement the expansion without a funding mechanism that meets his criteria.

=== Immigration ===
Governor LePage is opposed to offering a home for asylum seekers in Maine. In a February 2016 town meeting he called asylum seekers "the biggest problem in our state". It is his opinion that "they're bringing hepatitis C, tuberculosis, AIDS, HIV and the 'ziki fly'," apparently referring to the Zika virus.

=== LGBT rights ===
In 2009, LePage opposed allowing same-sex couples to marry. He does support the state recognizing only civil unions of all couples, believing it would give everyone the same legal standing. During his gubernatorial campaign, he iterated his opposition to same-sex marriage and expressed support for unspecified legal measures to protect committed same-sex couples. In October 2010 he stated that gay marriage should be left to the voters and that he had no personal views on the matter, though he would have vetoed a same-sex marriage bill if it reached his desk.

LePage was critical of the Maine Education Associations' support of the 2012 same-sex marriage initiative, believing the union's taking of political positions hurts the education of Maine students. When asked about LePage's own position on the initiative, his spokeswoman declined to comment.

On the topic of transgender students in grades K–12, he said he did not understand "how people, at least sane people, would want to allow transgender in our primary schools and our high schools." LePage then pledged to oppose legislation for transgender students, saying, "I think it's gone too far and we have to push back. As governor, I would never allow that to be signed into law." In 2018, LePage vetoed a bill banning conversion therapy, arguing that the proposed legislation would undermine the ability of therapists to converse with their clients. The next year, the bill was signed into law by LePage's successor, Governor Janet Mills.

=== Pardon power use ===
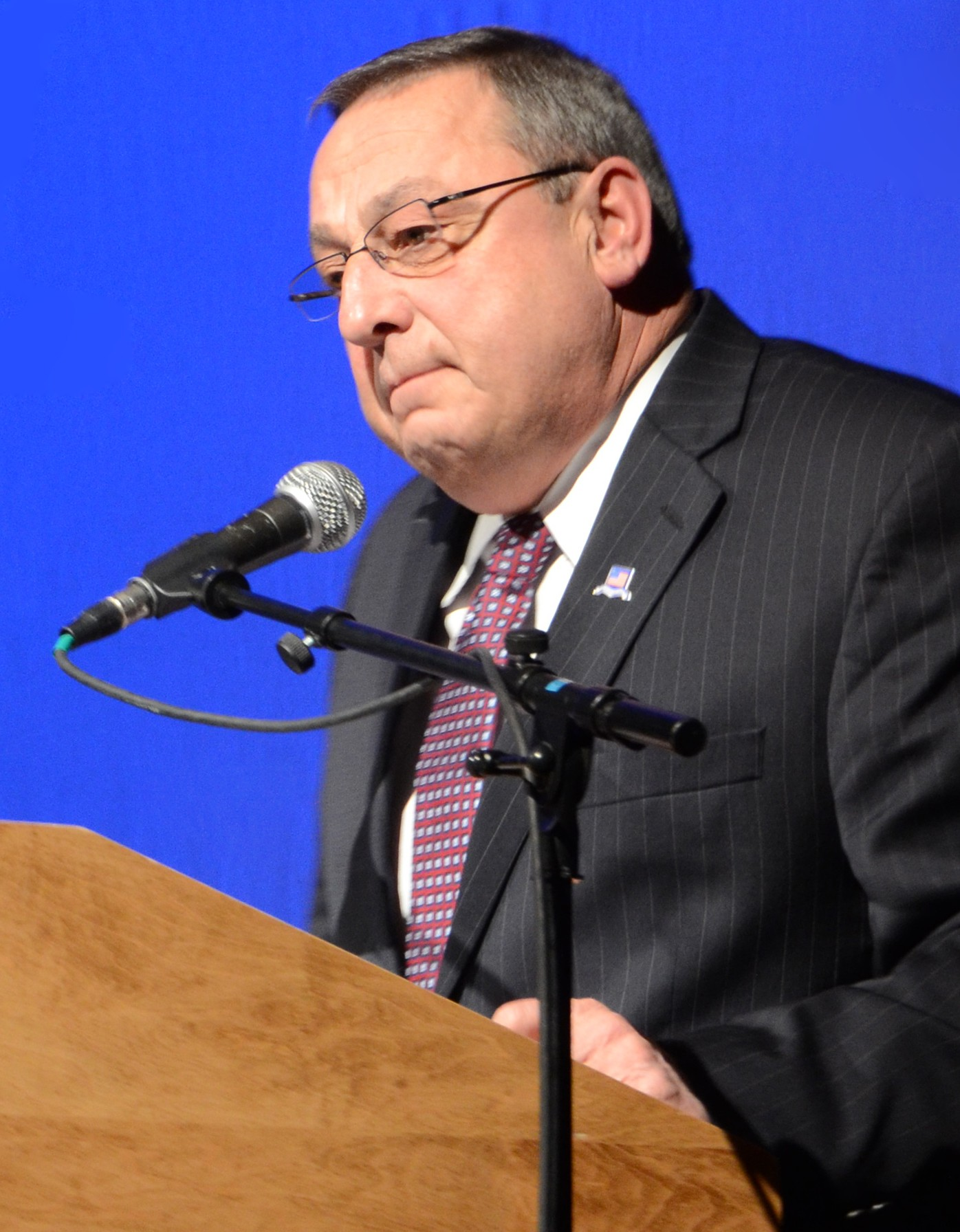
LePage speaking at an event honoring the Maine National Guard at the University of Maine in 2011

While governor, LePage issued 236 pardons to 115 people. One of his last acts as governor was to pardon former Republican state representative Jeffrey Pierce for a felony drug trafficking conviction 35 years prior. Pierce lost his reelection effort after Democrats discussed his felony conviction during the campaign and he then conceded that he had used firearms to hunt after his felony conviction, which would be illegal for a felon. Hunting license applications also ask the applicant if they have been convicted of a crime. The matter was being investigated by the Maine Warden Service, an investigation that the pardon may affect. The pardon generated controversy when it was revealed it was granted against the advice of Maine's clemency board. Further information is restricted due to state law making information related to pardons confidential. The Associated Press, through a public records request, learned that Pierce's pardon as well as a pardon for the grandson of LePage's late mentor were given without a public hearing and consultation with the clemency board. A former clemency board chair stated that in their 27 years on the board they never saw a governor grant a pardon without a public hearing.

During LePage's tenure as governor, Maine enacted a change in the voting system from plurality voting to ranked-choice voting. Maine had a history of independent candidates running and being competitive in elections, which gave rise to strategic voting and concerns over spoiler candidates. LePage's wins in 2010 and 2014, both times with a plurality, not majority, of the vote, and his unpopular tenure, has been cited as a primary motivating factor for the change in voting systems. The shift from plurality voting to ranked-choice voting was approved by voters in a 2016 ballot referendum. LePage opposed the change in voting systems.

In February 2019, the Portland Press Herald reported that LePage and his staff had spent at least $22,000 of tax-payer money to stay at the Trump International Hotel in Washington D.C., a luxury hotel owned by President Trump's family. During his last two years in office, LePage and his staff spent approximately $170,000 in out-of-state travel. In comparison, LePage's predecessor, Governor John Baldacci, spent approximately $45,000 during the last two years of his tenure.

Starting in 2015, LePage stated he was "very strongly" considering entering the 2018 U.S. Senate race against incumbent independent Senator Angus King, citing King's caucusing with Senate Democrats. He was also critical of King for switching his 2014 gubernatorial election endorsement from independent candidate Eliot Cutler to Democratic nominee Mike Michaud. He has also said that he would not run if Hillary Clinton won the 2016 presidential election, saying "If it's Hillary Clinton, forget it, I'm gonna retire." He has also said that Ann LePage was not convinced that a Senate run is the best idea, and he would not run if she did not approve, or if he was serving in a Donald Trump administration. He ultimately announced on May 10, 2017, that he would not run, preferring to focus on being governor.

=== Race ===
LePage generated national headlines by stating at a January 6, 2016, town hall meeting in Bridgton regarding drug dealers:

(Drug dealers) are guys with the name D-Money, Smoothie, Shifty; these types of guys, they come from Connecticut and New York, they come up here, they sell their heroin, they go back home. Incidentally, half the time they impregnate a young, white girl before they leave, which is a real sad thing because then we have another issue we have to deal with down the road.

The comment was condemned as racist by some Republicans and Democrats, as well as the presidential campaign of Hillary Clinton. A spokesman for LePage denied the comment had anything to do with race.

On August 24, LePage was asked about these comments; he denied being a racist but said that he had been compiling a binder of drug arrestees since January and that "90-plus per cent of those pictures in my book, and it's a three-ringed binder, are black and Hispanic people." When asked to provide the binder, LePage replied, "Let me tell you something: black people come up the highway and they kill Mainers. You ought to look into that. You make me so sick." The Portland Press Herald subsequently filed a Freedom of Information Act request for LePage's binder.

The following day, a reporter insinuated to LePage that Democratic state representative Drew Gattine had called him a racist. LePage responded by calling Gattine and leaving him a voicemail message:

Mr. Gattine, this is Governor Paul Richard LePage. I would like to talk to you about your comments about my being a racist, you cocksucker. I want to talk to you. You want — I want you to prove that I'm a racist. I've spent my life helping black people and you little son of a bitch, socialist cocksucker. You — I need you to just fricking — I want you to record this and make it public because I am after you. Thank you.

He later invited reporters from the Portland Press Herald and WMTW to an interview to explain the comments, saying that

I wish it were 1825 and we would have a duel, that's how angry I am, and I would not put my gun in the air, I guarantee you ... I would point it right between his eyes, because he is a snot-nosed little runt and he has not done a damn thing since he's been in this legislature to help move the state forward.

Gattine responded by calling LePage's message "upsetting, inappropriate and uncalled for." LePage produced a binder of drug arrestees and went through some of the mugshots with the press. While admitting that the binder contained photos of both blacks and whites, LePage produced a page with a photo and press clipping of a young white woman who had been arrested, LePage called her a "very lovely young Mainer, maybe 20 years old." He then held up another page with a picture of a black man on it and said, "That's the other culprit." Reporting on the incident, Portland Press Herald quoted figures showing that according to the FBI's Criminal Justice Information Service, in 2014 of the 1,211 people in Maine arrested on charges of drug sales or manufacturing only 14.1 percent were black, and almost all the rest were white. LePage's comments were widely condemned by Democrats and some Republicans, including U.S. Senator Susan Collins, State Senate President Michael Thibodeau, State House Minority Leader Kenneth Fredette, State Senator Roger Katz, and State Senator David Woodsome. Leading Democrats called LePage "unfit" to serve and demanded his resignation.

=== Taxes ===
LePage advocates eliminating Maine's income tax, believing it to be an impediment to economic growth for the state. He stated that his goal was to do so before the end of his second term, and he proposed a constitutional amendment to do so, though he expected the legislature to reject it. He opposed one bipartisan plan to replace the current progressive income tax rates, which have a top rate of 7.95%, with a 4% flat income tax rate and a broader, higher sales tax because he believes it is not revenue-neutral. After his re-election he expressed support for the general idea of increasing or broadening the sales tax to reduce or eliminate the income tax which he later proposed in his 2015–2016 budget. He has said he will "spend the rest of my days" fighting opponents of his tax proposals, especially in the legislative election year of 2016.

=== Welfare reform ===
Welfare reform was a centerpiece of LePage's gubernatorial campaign. In December 2011, citing a budget shortfall, LePage proposed sweeping changes to MaineCare (Maine's Medicaid program). Those changes include dropping 5,000 to 6,000 low-income senior citizens with disabilities from the Drugs for the Elderly program (which provides low-cost prescription drugs to low-income elderly patients), and ending Medicaid coverage for up to 65,000 recipients, including many who are disabled or elderly. Reimbursement to hospitals and other medical providers would be reduced by up to 10 percent, which could trigger the elimination of up to 4,400 health care jobs. The changes could also result in higher premiums and higher co-pays for people with private health insurance.

LePage expressed an intent to reform welfare eligibility requirements, though he did not specify how he would do so. He also supports lifetime limits on welfare support, requiring recipients to perform work in the community, and a tiered payment system that gradually removes benefits as recipients earn more money working, rather than cutting them off entirely at a certain income level.

Speaking before a conservative women's group in Falmouth on October 14, 2013, LePage said that "About 47 percent of able-bodied people in the state of Maine don't work ... It's really bad." It is uncertain where LePage obtained his figures since Maine's unemployment rate is actually below the national average. According to an analysis posted on PolitiFact, only about ten percent of "able-bodied people" age 18 to 64 in Maine were not working, and if unemployed Maine residents who were looking for work were excluded from the count, the number not working drops to 3.6 percent. Pointing to a report issued by a conservative think tank, the Maine Heritage Policy Center, LePage's spokeswoman, Adrienne Bennett, said, "Liberal activists are determined to increase the number of residents who take tax dollars by expanding the size of government and the benefits government workers get and increasing the welfare rolls."

LePage supports reforms in how EBT cards are used. Proposals he favors include putting photos of cardholders on the card to prevent their sale by the holder, an idea that he proposed after hearing of several incidents where EBT cards turned up in drug busts. He also wants to better prohibit their use to purchase alcohol or cigarettes. He has stated that such fraud is a large problem and he will devote resources to investigating it and generating further proposals to combat it. He has also suggested that he would be willing to shut down the entire EBT program if the federal government will not allow Maine to take measures to combat fraud.

LePage is opposed to the distribution of General Assistance welfare funds to illegal immigrants by municipalities. He has threatened to cut off all state reimbursement of such funds unless municipalities stop doing so, citing federal laws which don't allow welfare funds to go to illegal immigrants unless a state passes a law to specifically allow it. Maine Attorney General Janet Mills has stated that the governor implementing such a policy without using the established rulemaking process or legislative action is likely against the Maine Constitution. LePage responded to that criticism by stating he found it "inexcusable" that the state's top law enforcement official would advocate violating federal law, and adding that he believes Congress passing the federal laws in question meets the requirement for legislative involvement.

== Awards and honors ==
- In 2006, LePage was voted the Mid-Maine Chamber of Commerce's businessman of the year.
- In 2007, he was named "Maine Business Champion" by the National Federation of Independent Business.
- LePage received an honorary doctorate from Thomas College in Waterville, at their graduation ceremonies on May 12, 2012, where he was the keynote speaker.
- On September 10, 2013, LePage received an award from the Maine Suicide Prevention Program to recognize his efforts to prevent and raise awareness about suicide.
- On May 13, 2019, LePage was given an honorary degree by the University of Maine System Board of Trustees to recognize his support of education in Maine, and specifically the university system.

== Personal life ==
In 1971, LePage married Sharon Crabbe, whose family owned a lumber business in New Brunswick, where LePage worked as treasurer and general manager. They resided in Perth-Andover, New Brunswick, and their two daughters were born in 1975 and 1976. LePage and Crabbe divorced in 1980.

LePage has two children with his second wife, Ann DeRosby, whom he married in 1984. Since 2002, his household has also included a young man from Jamaica, whom he calls an adopted son.

LePage and his wife purchased a home in Boothbay on July 30, 2014, for $215,000 that they intended to live in once his term as governor had concluded. Just before the 2018 election to select his successor, he stated that he would move to Florida for a majority of the year and become a legal resident there in order to pay no income tax and less in property taxes. He also sold the Boothbay residence. LePage and Ann DeRosby have had conflicts with Florida tax authorities since they have claimed full-time residence in the state while not fulfilling the requirement to live there for the required amount of time to do so. In 2019, LePage moved back to Maine. After the 2022 election, LePage returned to Florida, registering to vote in Flagler County.

LePage is a self-described "French Catholic" who believes in God.

In January 2017, LePage said that he had undergone bariatric surgery and lost 50 pounds (23 kg), after his doctor warned that he was at risk of diabetes if he did not lose weight.

LePage returned to Maine in June 2019 to take a job as a bartender at McSeagulls Restaurant in Boothbay, where his wife had worked as a server during his gubernatorial tenure. The restaurant owner stated that hiring LePage was not a publicity stunt, citing the difficulty of hiring new workers.

== Electoral history ==
Maine gubernatorial Republican primary, 2010
Party	Candidate	Votes	%
Republican	Paul LePage	49,126	37.4
Republican	Leslie Otten	22,945	17.5
Republican	Peter Mills	19,271	14.7
Republican	Steven Abbott	17,209	13.1
Republican	William Beardsley	12,061	9.2
Republican	Bruce Poliquin	6,471	4.9
Republican	Matthew Jacobson	4,321	3.3

Maine gubernatorial election, 2010
Party	Candidate	Votes	%
Republican	Paul LePage	218,065	37.6
Independent	Eliot Cutler	208,270	35.9
Democratic	Elizabeth Mitchell	109,387	18.8
Independent	Shawn Moody	28,756	5.0
Independent	Kevin Scott	5,664	1.0

Maine gubernatorial election, 2014
Party	Candidate	Votes	%
Republican	Paul LePage (incumbent)	294,519	48.2
Democratic	Mike Michaud	265,114	43.4
Independent	Eliot Cutler	51,515	8.4

Maine gubernatorial Republican primary, 2022
Party	Candidate	Votes	%
Republican	Paul LePage	65,684	100

Maine gubernatorial election, 2022
Party	Candidate	Votes	%
Democratic	Janet Mills (incumbent)	373,372	55.7
Republican	Paul LePage	286,440	42.5
Independent	Sam Hunkler	12,581	1.9

== Notes ==
Party political offices
Preceded by Chandler Woodcock	Republican nominee for Governor of Maine; 2010, 2014	Succeeded by Shawn Moody
Preceded by Shawn Moody	Republican nominee for Governor of Maine; 2022	Succeeded by Bobby Charles
Political offices
Preceded by John Baldacci	Governor of Maine; 2011–2019	Succeeded by Janet Mills
U.S. House of Representatives
Preceded by Jared Golden	Member of the U.S. House of Representatives from Maine's 2nd congressional district Taking office 2027	Elect
U.S. order of precedence (ceremonial)
Preceded by John Baldacci as Former Governor	Order of precedence of the United States; Within Maine	Succeeded by Jack Markell as Former Governor
Preceded by John Baldacci as Former Governor	Order of precedence of the United States; Outside Maine	Succeeded by Roger B. Wilson as Former Governor
