= Peter Mills (American politician) =

American politician

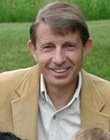
- Mills in 2006

Member of the Maine Senate
- In office December 1, 2004 – December 1, 2010
- Preceded by: Pamela Hatch
- Succeeded by: Rodney Whittemore
- Constituency: 26th district
- In office December 7, 1994 – December 4, 2002
- Preceded by: Harold D. Marden
- Succeeded by: Pamela Hatch
- Constituency: 13th district

Member of the Maine House of Representatives from the 108th district
- In office December 4, 2002 – December 1, 2004
- Preceded by: Vaughn Stedman
- Succeeded by: Vaughn Stedman

Personal details
- Born: Sumner Peter Mills III; June 3, 1943 (age 83) Farmington, Maine, U.S.
- Party: Republican
- Parent: S. Peter Mills Jr. (father)
- Relatives: Sumner P. Mills (grandfather); Janet Mills (sister)
- Education: Harvard College (BA); University of Maine (JD)

Military service
- Branch/service: United States Navy
- Years of service: 1965-1970
- Battles/wars: Vietnam War

Sumner Peter Mills III (born June 3, 1943) is an American lawyer and politician from Maine. A Republican, Mills served in the Maine Senate, representing the 26th district. He ran for Governor of Maine in 2006 and 2010 and lost both times in the Republican primary. He is the older brother of the current Governor of Maine Janet Mills.

== Early life and family ==
Mills was born in Farmington, Maine, the son of Katherine Louise (Coffin) and Sumner Peter Mills Jr., and grew up in Gorham. He graduated from Gorham High School in 1961. After graduating cum laude from Harvard College in 1965, he served five years on United States Navy destroyers with 3 duty tours in the Vietnam War, for which he was awarded the Navy Achievement Medal. He later conducted intelligence missions against the Soviet Union for which he was awarded the Navy Commendation Medal. Mills graduated second in his class from the University of Maine Law School in 1973.

== Career ==
Mills spent 32 years working as a lawyer in Skowhegan and Portland. For 23 years, he has owned Wright & Mills in Skowhegan. He is a founding member of the Somerset Economic Development Corporation and a founding member of FirstPark, a business park in central Maine.

=== Naval service ===
When he was a 17-year-old senior at Gorham High School, Mills was awarded a Navy scholarship to Harvard under the Holloway program.

On his third summer cruise in 1964, he was a midshipman aboard the destroyer USS Blue while serving on Yankee Station. The Blue and another destroyer were relieved by the Maddox and Turner Joy just before the famous Tonkin Gulf incident.

For five years of active duty, from July 1965 until July 1970, Mills had three tours of about 20 months each on the Dyess (DD 880), DESRON 2 staff aboard the Blandy (DD 943) and the McMorris (DE 1036).

On the Dyess he became the Communications Officer and qualified as OOD underway. The Dyess sailed from Newport around the world in order to serve on the Vietnam gunline, do plane guard duty on Yankee Station and patrol the Taiwan Straits. It fired 2787 rounds of 5′38 while on the gunline.

On Desron 2, Mills was the staff communications officer. From Norfolk, his squadron was sent through the Panama Canal to WestPac. For much of his time in the Western Pacific, his squadron staff commanded the gunline. While he was aboard the Blandy, the ship fired over 26,000 rounds of 5″54 which was a record for the gunline up to that time. They received return fire from the coast on occasion but without casualties.

For his last tour he was OPS boss and senior watch officer aboard the McMorris out of Pearl and was responsible for training junior officers in ship handling.

On one assignment, he was highly successful in collecting certain physical information about Soviet MRVs that was immediately released by the Nixon administration to support the ABM bill then pending in Congress. The bill still failed to pass.

=== Maine Legislature ===
During 15 years in the Maine Legislature (most recently in the State Senate), he served as a Republican lead on Tax, Labor, Judiciary, Appropriations, Education and Health & Human Services Committees. He was outspoken in advocating change in tax and school funding systems, and worked to pass reforms in health care and education.

In 1999 he led the Labor Committee to overhaul Maine's Unemployment Compensation system, to eliminate benefits, build reserves and reduce taxes. In 2005 he launched "Don't Mortgage ME," a petition drive to repeal a $447 million borrowing scheme. In 2009 the Legislature passed his bill to design a portable benefit system for new teachers and state employees. In 2008 the Legislature unanimously passed his Fund of Funds bill to attract venture capital for growing businesses. Governor John Baldacci vetoed the bill.

=== 2006 gubernatorial campaign ===
In 2005, Mills declared his candidacy for governor in the 2006 election. In the Republican primary, he faced former U.S. Representative Dave Emery and State Senator Chandler Woodcock. Mills lost to Woodcock by 2,400 votes. Woodcock lost to incumbent Democrat John Baldacci in the November general election.

=== 2010 gubernatorial campaign ===
On July 22, 2009 Mills filed paperwork with the Maine Ethics Commission for entry into the 2010 Maine gubernatorial race. He was the fourth Republican to declare his candidacy, joined by Matt Jacobson, Les Otten, and Bruce Poliquin. Waterville mayor and businessperson Paul LePage was subsequently chosen to be the Republican candidate for governor in 2010.

=== Turnpike Authority ===
In March 2011, Governor Paul LePage appointed Mills as the Executive Director of the Maine Turnpike Authority. He resigned in September 2024.

== Personal life ==
Mills' family is also involved in public service. His father, S. Peter Mills Jr. served in the Maine legislature, in the Navy, and in the United States Department of Justice as U.S. Attorney. The elder Mills served as personal attorney to Wilhelm Reich, later became U.S. Attorney for the District of Maine, and prosecuted Reich. His sister, Janet Mills, was the first female District Attorney in New England, and was elected Maine Attorney General by the Legislature in December 2008. Janet currently serves as Governor of Maine, the state's first female governor. Unlike Peter and their father, Janet is a Democrat. His sister Dora Mills was Maine's Public Health Director. His wife Nancy is a judge for the Cumberland County Superior Court.

He has three adult daughters and three grandchildren. Two of his daughters are educators. One serves in the United States Army.

Since leaving the legislature, Mills has practiced law and manages woodlots in Cornville where he lives with his wife, Superior Court Justice Nancy Mills.

== Electoral history ==
Office	Year	Candidate	Party	Pct	Opponent	Party	Pct
Maine Legislative Elections
St. Senate	1996	Peter Mills	Republican	61%	Gerald York	Democratic	39%
St. Senate	1998	Peter Mills	Republican	59%	Richard Smith	Democratic	41%
St. Senate	2000	Peter Mills	Republican	55%	Pamela Hatch	Democratic	45%
St. House	2002	Peter Mills	Republican	52%	Michael Cray	Democratic	48%
St. Senate	2004	Peter Mills	Republican	53%	Pamela Hatch	Democratic	47%
St. Senate	2006	Peter Mills	Republican	63%	Paul Hatch	Democratic	36%
2006 Republican Primary for Governor of Maine
		Chandler Woodcock	Republican	38.6%			
		Peter Mills	Republican	35.2%			
		David F. Emery	Republican	26.3%			
St. Senate	2008	Peter Mills	Republican	65%	Robert Sezak	Democratic	35%

Maine Senate
Preceded by Harold D. Marden	Member of the Maine Senate from the 13th district 1994–2002	Succeeded by Pamela Hatch
Preceded by Karl Turner	Member of the Maine Senate from the 26th district 2004–2010	Succeeded by Rodney Whittemore
Maine House of Representatives
Preceded by Vaughn Stedman	Member of the Maine House of Representatives from the 108th district 2002–2004	Succeeded by Terrence P. McKenney
