= Matthew Mulligan =

American football player (born 1985)

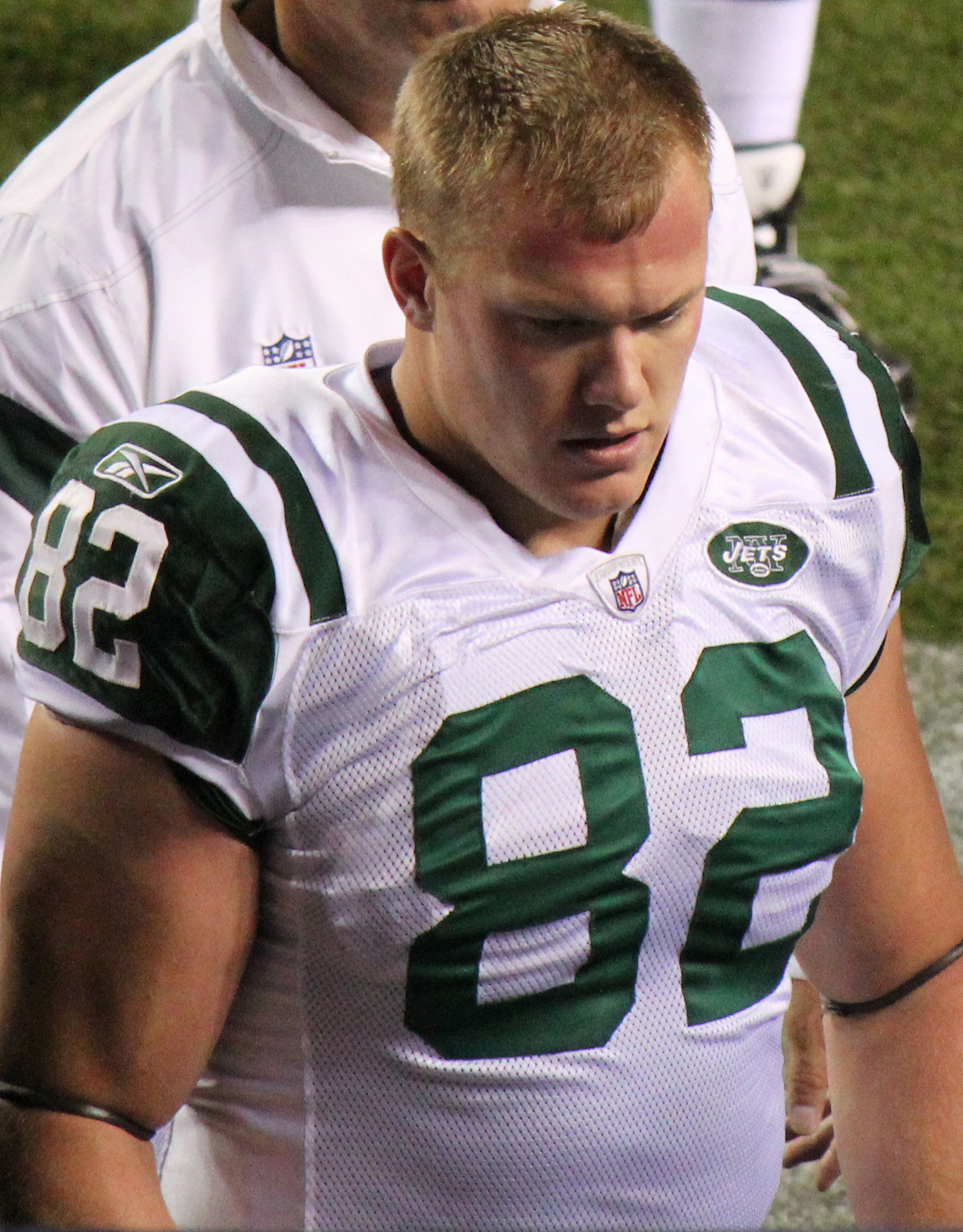
- Mulligan with the New York Jets in 2011

No. 82, 88, 85, 89
- Position: Tight end

Personal information
- Born: January 18, 1985 (age 41); Bangor, Maine, U.S.
- Listed height: 6 ft 4 in (1.93 m)
- Listed weight: 258 lb (117 kg)

Career information
- High school: Penobscot Valley (Howland, Maine)
- College: Maine
- NFL draft: 2008: undrafted

Career history
- Miami Dolphins (2008)*; Tennessee Titans (2008–2009)*; New York Jets (2009–2011); St. Louis Rams (2012); Green Bay Packers (2013)*; New England Patriots (2013); Chicago Bears (2014); Arizona Cardinals (2014); Tennessee Titans (2014); Buffalo Bills (2015); Detroit Lions (2016)
- * Offseason or practice squad member only

Career NFL statistics
- Receptions: 18
- Receiving yards: 170
- Receiving touchdowns: 2
- Stats at Pro Football Reference

Matthew Ben Mulligan (born January 18, 1985) is an American former professional football player who was a tight end in the National Football League (NFL). He played college football for the Maine Black Bears. Mulligan was signed by the Miami Dolphins as an undrafted free agent in 2008. He was also a member of the Tennessee Titans, New York Jets, St. Louis Rams, Green Bay Packers, New England Patriots, Chicago Bears, Arizona Cardinals, Buffalo Bills, and Detroit Lions. He currently serves as a volunteer strength and conditioning coach for the Maine Black Bears.

== Early life ==
Mulligan lived in Enfield, Maine and attended high school at Penobscot Valley High School in Howland, Maine. After high school, he enrolled at Husson University. Despite never playing the sport in high school, Mulligan joined Husson's football team as a tight end and thrived, transferring to the University of Maine the following season.

== Professional career ==
=== Miami Dolphins ===
Mulligan was signed by the Miami Dolphins as an undrafted free agent in 2008. He was released from the Dolphins on August 30 during final cuts. However, the Dolphins re-signed him to the practice squad the following day. Mulligan remained on the practice squad until his release on November 5.

=== Tennessee Titans (first stint) ===
Mulligan was signed to the practice squad of the Tennessee Titans on November 19, 2008. Following the season, he was re-signed to a future contract on January 12. The Titans waived him on September 4.

=== New York Jets ===
Mulligan was claimed off waivers by the New York Jets on September 6, 2009. He was waived on September 23. He was re-signed to the practice squad on September 24. He was promoted to the active roster on December 2.

=== St. Louis Rams ===
The St. Louis Rams signed Mulligan on March 26, 2012. After one season with the team, Mulligan was released on March 23, 2013.

=== Green Bay Packers ===
Mulligan was signed by the Green Bay Packers on April 9, 2013. On August 31, 2013, he was released by the Packers during final team cuts.

=== New England Patriots ===
On September 3, 2013, the New England Patriots signed Mulligan, but released him just two days later. The Patriots re-signed him on September 10. On September 29, 2013, he caught the last touchdown pass of Tom Brady's 52 straight games (two shy of the NFL record) with at least one passing touchdown.

=== Chicago Bears ===
On April 8, 2014, Mulligan was signed by the Chicago Bears to a one-year deal. On September 16, 2014, his contract was terminated by the Chicago Bears.

=== Arizona Cardinals ===
Mulligan signed with the Arizona Cardinals on November 18, 2014. He was released on December 5, 2014.

=== Tennessee Titans (second stint) ===
On December 16, 2014, Mulligan signed with the Titans.

=== Buffalo Bills ===
On June 18, 2015, Mulligan signed with the Buffalo Bills. On December 8, 2015, Mulligan was released by the Bills after Nick O'Leary was promoted from the practice squad.

=== Detroit Lions ===
On April 4, 2016, Mulligan signed a one-year contract with the Detroit Lions. On August 29, 2016, Mulligan was released by the Lions. He was re-signed by the Lions on November 1, 2016.
