= 2017 Maine Question 2 =

Question 2: Citizen Initiative
- An Act To Enhance Access to Affordable Health Care. Do you want Maine to expand Medicaid to provide healthcare coverage for qualified adults under age 65 with incomes at or below 138% of the federal poverty level, which in 2017 means $16,643 for a single person and $22,412 for a family of two?

Results
Choice	Votes	%
Yes	203,080	58.95%
No	141,436	41.05%
Valid votes	344,516	100.00%
Invalid or blank votes	0	0.00%
Total votes	344,516	100.00%

Yes
60–70%
50–60%
No
50–60%

Maine Question 2, formally entitled "An Act To Enhance Access to Affordable Health Care", was a citizen-initiated ballot measure that appeared on the November 7, 2017 statewide ballot in the State of Maine. Maine Question 2 sought to expand Medicaid eligibility under the terms of the Affordable Care Act. The measure passed.

== Background ==
Expanded eligibility for the Medicaid program, called MaineCare in Maine, was a provision of the Affordable Care Act signed into law by President Barack Obama on March 23, 2010. The expansion was originally required of states as a condition of all federal Medicaid funding, but the United States Supreme Court ruled in National Federation of Independent Business v. Sebelius that such expansion was optional for states.

Maine Republican Gov. Paul LePage criticized the eligibility requirements for MaineCare, feeling that it was too easy to qualify for as it existed when he took office in 2010. He was a staunch opponent of the Affordable Care Act, believing that it violated the Constitution and took freedoms from citizens. LePage vetoed six efforts to expand MaineCare eligibility. On one occasion, LePage described efforts by the Maine Legislature to write an expansion bill that would garner bipartisan support as having "no compassion".

Supporters of expansion, led by Maine Equal Justice Partners, announced on October 12, 2016 that they intended to launch a petition drive to put the issue to the voters. LePage's spokesperson criticized the effort as "another attempt by liberals to pass welfare expansion".

Maine Secretary of State Matthew Dunlap announced on February 21, 2017 that supporters of the measure had submitted over 66,000 verified signatures, far above the 61,123 required to place a measure on the ballot.

The question that appeared on petition forms was: "Do you want Maine to provide health insurance through Medicaid for qualified adults under the age of 65 with incomes at or below 138 percent of the federal poverty line?" During the comment period before the question's wording was finalized, several Republican legislators disputed the inclusion of the word "insurance" in the question, arguing that MaineCare benefits are not insurance, but welfare benefits. Those legislators opined that the question did not meet the Maine Constitution's requirement that referendum questions be "simple, clear, concise, and direct". They further noted that the word "insurance" did not appear in the proposed referendum itself. Supporters defended the use of the word "insurance" on the grounds that MaineCare does not provide cash to recipients, but directly pays providers of medical services. At the end of the comment period, Secretary Dunlap announced that the final wording of the question would replace the word "insurance" with "coverage". Representatives of both sides of the issue announced their support of the decision.

The ballot question read as follows: "Do you want Maine to expand Medicaid to provide healthcare coverage for qualified adults under age 65 with incomes at or below 138% of the federal poverty level, which in 2017 means $16,643 for a single person and $22,412 for a family of two?"

== Campaign ==
=== Endorsements ===
==== Supporters ====
===== Individuals =====
- Janet Mills, Maine Attorney General
- George J. Mitchell, former United States Senate Majority Leader
- Chellie Pingree, U.S. Representative

===== Organizations =====
Yes on 2
- American Association of University Women (AAUW) Maine Chapter
- American College of Physicians - Maine Chapter
- Alliance for Addiction and Mental Health Services
- Alliance for Maine Women
- Congolese Community of Maine
- Congregation Bet Ha'am
- Consumers for Affordable Health Care
- Daily Kos
- Eastern Maine Labor Council
- Equality Maine
- First Parish Portland Unitarian Universalist
- Friends (Quakers) Committee on Maine Public Policy
- Kennebec Valley Community Action Program
- League of Women Voters of Maine
- Maine AFL-CIO
- Maine Association of Interdependent Neighborhoods
- Maine Children's Alliance
- Maine Coalition to End Domestic Violence
- Maine Community Action Association
- Maine Council of Churches
- Maine Dental Hygenists Association
- Maine Family Planning
- Maine Hospital Association
- Maine Nurse Practitioner Association
- Maine Primary Care Association
- Maine Providers Standing Up for Healthcare
- Maine Public Health Association
- Maine Small Business Coalition
- Maine State Nurses Association
- Maine Women's Lobby
- Maranacook Family Health Care
- MSEA-SEIU Local 198
- National Alliance on Mental Illness (NAMI) Maine
- National Association of Social Workers (NASW) Maine Chapter
- National Multiple Sclerosis Society, Greater New England Chapter
- New Mainers Public Health Initiative
- Northeast Occupational Exchange
- Penquis Community Action Program
- Shalom House, Inc.
- Southern Maine Democratic Socialists of America
- The Opportunity Alliance
- United Way of Greater Portland
- Waldo Community Action Partners
- YWCA Central Maine

===== Media =====
- Bangor Daily News
- MaineToday Media newspapers; Portland Press Herald, Kennebec Journal, Morning Sentinel

==== Opponents ====
- Paul LePage, Governor of Maine
- Mary Mayhew, former commissioner of the Maine Department of Health and Human Services and candidate for governor in 2018
- Rep. Heather Sirocki of the Maine House of Representatives
- Rep. Karen Vachon of the Maine House of Representatives
- Maine Department of Health and Human Services
- Welfare to Work PAC

== Results and aftermath ==
On November 7, 2017, Maine Question 2 passed, 203,080 to 141,436.

Gov. LePage stated that he would not implement the Medicaid expansion required by Maine Question 2 unless the Legislature funded it without a tax increase and without using money from the state Rainy Day Fund. Medicaid expansion became an issue in the 2018 elections. Democratic gubernatorial candidate Janet Mills stated she would implement the law, and Republican Shawn Moody stated he would continue LePage's refusal to do so.

Supporters of expansion sued the LePage administration on April 30, 2018 to force the expansion to be implemented. On June 4, 2018, Judge Michaela Murphy ruled that Maine Department of Health and Human Services Commissioner Ricker Hamilton must submit a plan for expansion by June 11 to allow MaineCare to start accepting newly eligible applicants on July 2, 2018. LePage said that he would rather go to jail than implement the expansion without a funding mechanism that met his criteria.

LePage's successor, Democrat Janet Mills, signed an order implementing the referendum as one of her first acts, enabling signups to begin immediately.
