= Brent Littlefield =

- Education: University of Maine
- Occupations: President of Littlefield Consulting, Chief Strategist to Governor Paul LePage of Maine
- Known for: Political strategy and campaign management
- Political party: Republican

Brent Littlefield is a Republican political strategist, who is best known for his work as president of Littlefield Consulting, LLC, a Washington, D.C.–based political consulting firm. Since January 2010, he has served as senior political adviser for Governor Paul LePage of Maine. Littlefield is also a frequent on-air contributor for MSNBC.

== Early life and education ==
Littlefield grew up in Winn, a small town in Penobscot County, Maine, where he spent a great deal of time in and around paper mills, where his father worked.

After graduating high school, he pursued a college degree at the University of Maine, where he earned a B.A. in Political Science. There he served as Vice-President and President of Student Government, as well as the Chairman of the Maine College Republicans.

== Political involvement ==
=== Early work ===
Littlefield's first entry into politics was with the Maine Senate Republican Caucus, where he worked to elect Republicans to the Maine Senate. That position led to an opportunity to join Governor John McKernan Jr.'s successful re-election campaign in 1990. There, he served as a field director, tasked with winning three communities with Republican registration deficits of 2-1.

Littlefield then served on the staff of Maine congressman Jim Longley, Jr. in Washington. The following year he directed Longley’s re-election campaign ground efforts.

After serving Longley, Littlefield moved on to work as Political Director for the National Federation of Independent Business. There he was involved in a number of political efforts including the small business group's IRS reform effort.

Prior to founding Littlefield Consulting, he served as a Partner in the Washington, DC–based Republican political consulting firm Political Solutions, which he founded in 2000. There, Littlefield worked for Presidential candidate Fred Thompson, U.S. Senators, Members of the United States Congress, including Congresswoman Shelley Moore Capito, and others.

=== Littlefield Consulting ===
Littlefield founded a new political consulting firm, Littlefield Consulting, LLC in April 2008, with the stated goal of focusing on "advising GOP candidates and free-market-advocacy organizations."

Since its founding, Littlefield has worked with the Republican National Committee, as well as a number of Republican 527 groups.

=== Senior political advisor to Governor LePage ===
In January 2010, Littlefield was brought on as senior political advisor to then Mayor Paul LePage, of Waterville, Maine.

Once on board, he was credited with orchestrating the political strategy responsible for LePage winning a seven-way contested primary, and being the first Republican in sixteen years to win a gubernatorial election in the fall.

The strategy was highly dependent on Littlefield having persuaded LePage to talk about his life story of overcoming adversity, which became major campaign themes. John Morris, LePage's campaign chief of staff, credits Littlefield for sharpening the campaign's focus and coming up with what he referred to as the "three onlys" theme before the Republican primary in June. "Paul was the only candidate who had a compelling life story. Paul was the only candidate who had a successful experience as a chief executive officer of a government entity. And Paul was the only candidate who was the executive of a prosperous Maine business," Morris said.

On November 2, 2010, Paul LePage won a narrow three-way race by roughly 10,000 votes. Since that time, Littlefield has continued to serve as senior political advisor for the LePage administration.

=== Media pundit ===
In addition to his work as a political consultant, Littlefield is frequently an on-air contributor for MSNBC and other media outlets, where he comments on current events from a conservative perspective, and provides insights from a campaign professional.

== Awards and recognition ==
Littlefield was awarded an American Association of Political Consultants "Pollie" Award in 2010 for his French-language phone strategy during the 2010 Maine gubernatorial election. In addition, he was also awarded a "Reed" Award by Campaigns & Elections Magazine in 2011 for best use of printed communication.

== Personal life and family ==
Littlefield is married to Gretchen Littlefield, a California native and Chair of the Direct Marketers Association Nonprofit Federation Government Affairs. They have one child.
