= Lance Harvell =

American politician

Member of the Maine House of Representatives from the 113th district
- In office 2016–2018
- Succeeded by: H. Scott Landry

Member of the Maine House of Representatives from the 89th district
- In office February 3, 2009 – December 2014
- Preceded by: Janet T. Mills
- Succeeded by: Andrew Buckland

Personal details
- Born: 1963 (age 62–63)
- Party: Republican

Lance Evans Harvell (born 1963) is an American politician from Maine. A Republican, Harvell was elected to the Maine House of Representatives on February 3, 2009, during a special election to replace Janet T. Mills. He was re-elected in 2010 and 2012. He is a service operator at Verso Paper's paper mill in Jay.

Harvell is a graduate of Mount Blue High School (class of 1981) and has taken courses at the University of Maine at Farmington. He is married with two children.
