= Marden's =

Maine's family-run retail chain with 14 locations

Marden's Surplus and Salvage
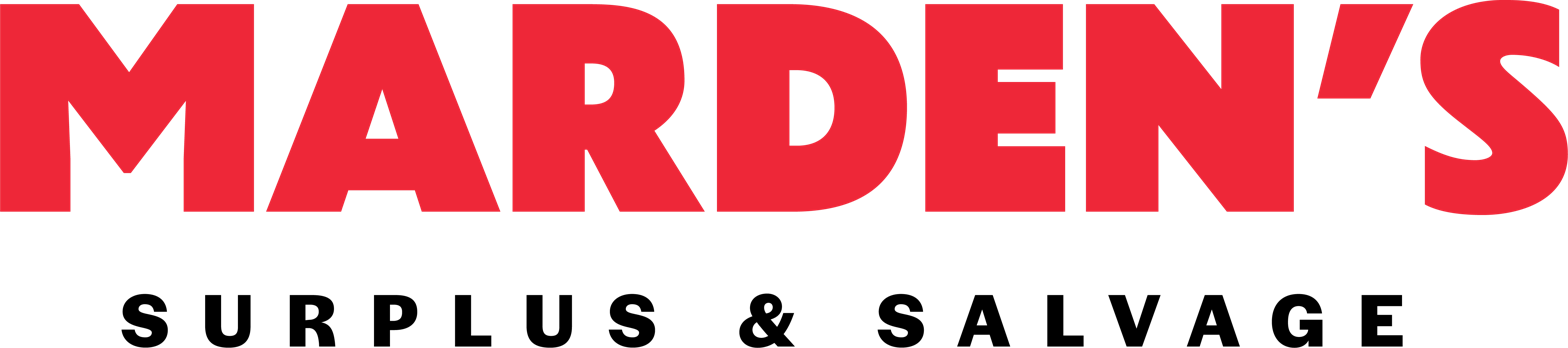
- Company type: Private
- Industry: Retail
- Founded: 1964
- Founder: Harold "Mickey" Marden
- Headquarters: Waterville, Maine, United States
- Number of locations: 14
- Website: https://www.mardens.com/

Marden's Surplus and Salvage is an independent family-run chain of retail stores in Maine. It was founded in 1964, and has 14 locations as of 2025.

== History ==
Marden's started in Fairfield, Maine in 1964, where Harold “Mickey” Marden, a mailman, held auctions of collectibles he'd gathered during rounds of the local auction circuit. Using a “from-the-hip-pricing” model, customers would walk through rows of goods and make their offer to Marden. "It was actually several years of that before products on the floor had prices. Everything was shoot from the hip pricing before that. That’s how the company started," Jake Marden told the Bangor Daily News in a story celebrating the store's 50th anniversary.

Marden's was originally modeled on insurance losses and salvages. The company acquires goods via a bidding process through the insurance company for a warehouse or retailer. As the insurance industry evolved, products were obtained through excess inventory or last-season goods from manufacturers.

Before entering politics, former Maine Governor Paul LePage worked as the general manager of the Marden's location in Waterville.

In 2009, the retailer expanded in Southern Maine with the opening of their Scarborough location. They took over a 119,000-square-foot space that formerly housed a Walmart store.

== Operations ==
Marden's stock includes furniture, hardware, mattresses, flooring, clothing, fabric, and footwear. Because the stock in stores frequently changes, the company's slogan is “I should have bought it when I saw it at Marden’s.”

Featured in the media, Marden's commercials at one point featured Birdie Googins, “The Marden’s Lady,” who was played by Maine comedian and actress Karmo Sanders.

== Locations ==
Locations include Sanford, Biddeford, Scarborough and Augusta, Gray, Lewiston, Waterville, Bangor, Ellsworth, Calais, Lincoln, Houlton, Presque Isle, Farmington and Madawaska.

== Philanthropy ==
The retailer partners with organizations including United Way, A Family for ME, The Maine Children's Home for Little Wanderers, Project Linus, and Kennebec Valley Community College of Maine. In May 2020, Marden's donated PPE to Maine's healthcare workers during the COVID-19 pandemic. That same month, they donated $30,000 in canned goods to Maine's Good Shepherd Food Bank.
