= Stephen Bowen (politician) =

American politician and educator

Member of the Maine House of Representatives
- In office December 2002 – December 2006

Personal details
- Born: June 6, 1969 (age 57) Portland, Maine
- Party: Republican
- Education: Drew University; George Mason University
- Profession: Schoolteacher

Stephen L. Bowen (born June 6, 1969) is an American politician and educator from Maine. A Republican, Bowen served in the Maine House of Representatives from 2002 to 2006, representing Camden and his residence in Rockport. Prior to serving in the Legislature, Bowen taught social studies for 10 years. After leaving elected office, Bowen directed the Center for Education Excellence at the Maine Heritage Policy Center. During the 2010 gubernatorial election, Bowen served as then candidate Paul LePage's policy adviser on education, government reform, budget and marine resources policy. LePage won the 2010 election and, in February 2011, newly elected Governor Paul LePage appointed Bowen Commissioner of Education. In August 2013, Bowen resigned as Education Commissioner effective September 12. He did so in order to take a position with the national Council of Chief State School Officers.

In a December 2011 poll of political insiders, Bowen was ranked as the 19th most influential person in Maine politics.

== Personal ==
Bowen was born in Portland, Maine and graduated from Drew University (B.A. in political science, 1991) and George Mason University (M.Ed. 1998). He is married to Heather Bowen and they have two children.
