= Penobscot Valley High School =

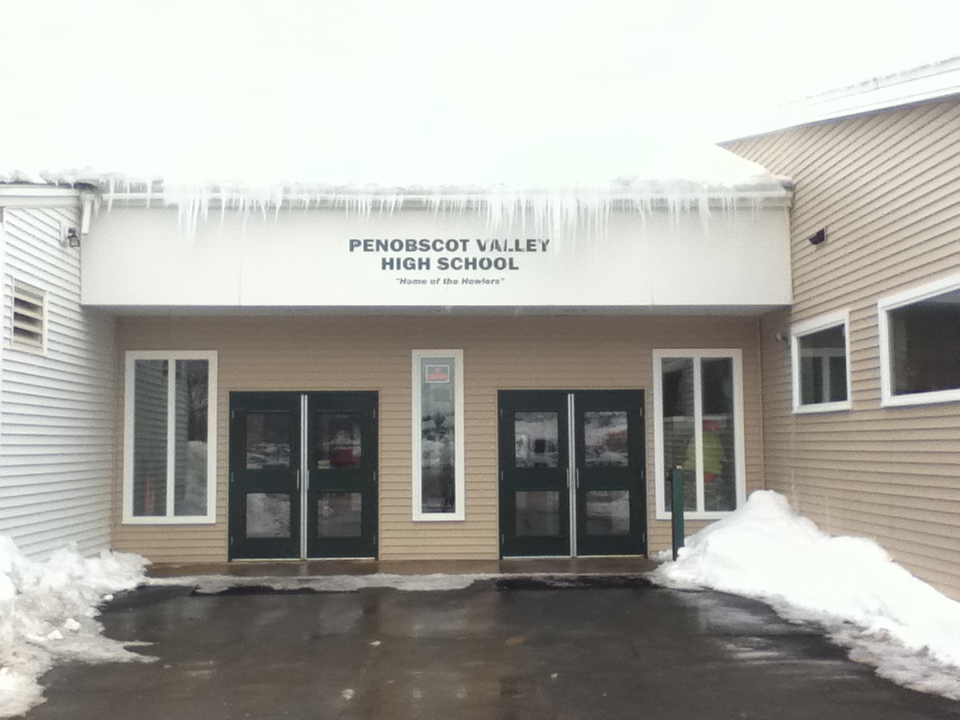

Location
- 23 Cross Street; Howland, Maine 04448; United States
- Coordinates: 45°14′50″N 68°39′43″W

Information
- Status: Open
- School district: SAU 31
- Superintendent: Michael Wright
- Principal: Shane Yardley
- Staff: 15.70 (FTE)
- Grades: 9–12
- Student to teacher ratio: 10.06
- Colors: Green and White
- Team name: Howlers
- Accreditation: NEASC
- Website: www.sau31.org/o/hmpvhs

Penobscot Valley High School (PVHS) is a 9–12 school serving approximately 140 students in Howland, Maine, United States. PVHS also employs approximately 28 teachers. PVHS is the only 9-12 school in School Administrative Unit 31.

== Notable achievements ==
On December 4, 2008, Usnews.com released their latest list of "Best High Schools" in the United States. Users were also able to search state by state, and Penobscot Valley High School was ranked the 8th best school in Maine. Penobscot Valley was also the only High School in Penobscot County, that was mentioned on the list. P.V.H.S. was awarded a "Bronze" overall, from U.S. News.

== Notable graduates ==
- Pamela Hatch, politician
- Matthew Mulligan, American football tight end

== "Spring Fling" ==
"Spring Fling" is a large event for Penobscot Valley students. At the beginning of every spring, there is a day dedicated to activities that students can participate in including a 3 Point Shootout, a Root Beer Chug, a Dodge Ball Tournament, etc. Points are scored for each class for winning each game. At the end of the day, the winning team is announced.

== George Sereyko Memorial Gymnasium ==
George Sereyko Memorial Gymnasium, or the Big Gym, is a standard sized gymnasium. The Big Gym is the separation point for HMS and PVHS. The Big Gym is technically a part of the high school, but when unoccupied, students from HMS will use it. In the winter of 2007–08, water began to leak underneath the gym floor. This caused large bubbles to form under the wood, destroying the floor. The 50-year-old floor was replaced by a new, shock absorbent floor.

== Local sports ==
PVHS students have an opportunity to play many different sports consisting of basketball, baseball, volleyball, cheerleading, soccer, Softball, and wrestling. Varsity basketball is a big sport for the small town school, where often parents, grandparents, friends, teachers, and towns people come out to cheer on their home team the "Howlers". Penobscot Valley High School no longer has a football team.

== Renovation of 2007 ==
In the summer of 2007, PVHS underwent a massive renovation, before this, the school had many problems. The school had a very limited heating system, leaving students forced to wear jackets into class. Roofs would leak in the cramped classrooms. The renovation gave the school a complete makeover. The schools walls and roofs were redone, leaving a state approved infrastructure. Old tiles in the hallways were replaced with newer ones. The renovation left the school more aesthetically pleasing. The old Workshop room, abandoned, was transformed into a new music building. Before the renovation, students had to walk outside into a separate building to go to their music classes. Under the hood changes included an advanced heating system, with a digital thermostat in every room. Solar panels were also installed into the main building during 2008 to lower the cost of electricity.

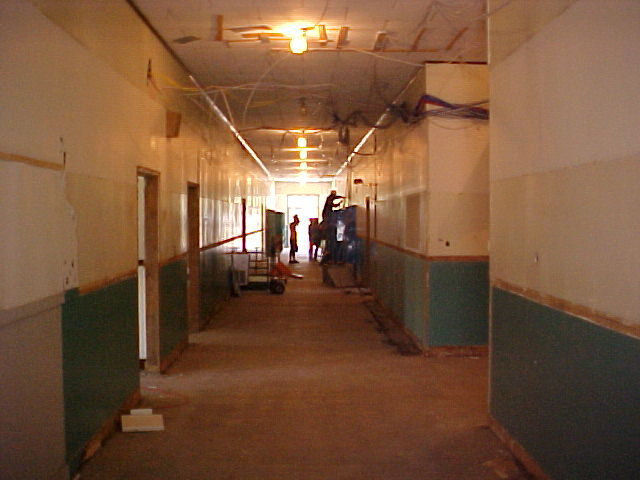
View down the hallway during the renovation

View of the computer lab before renovation.

School Before Renovation

Main Office Before Renovation

== "The Portables" ==
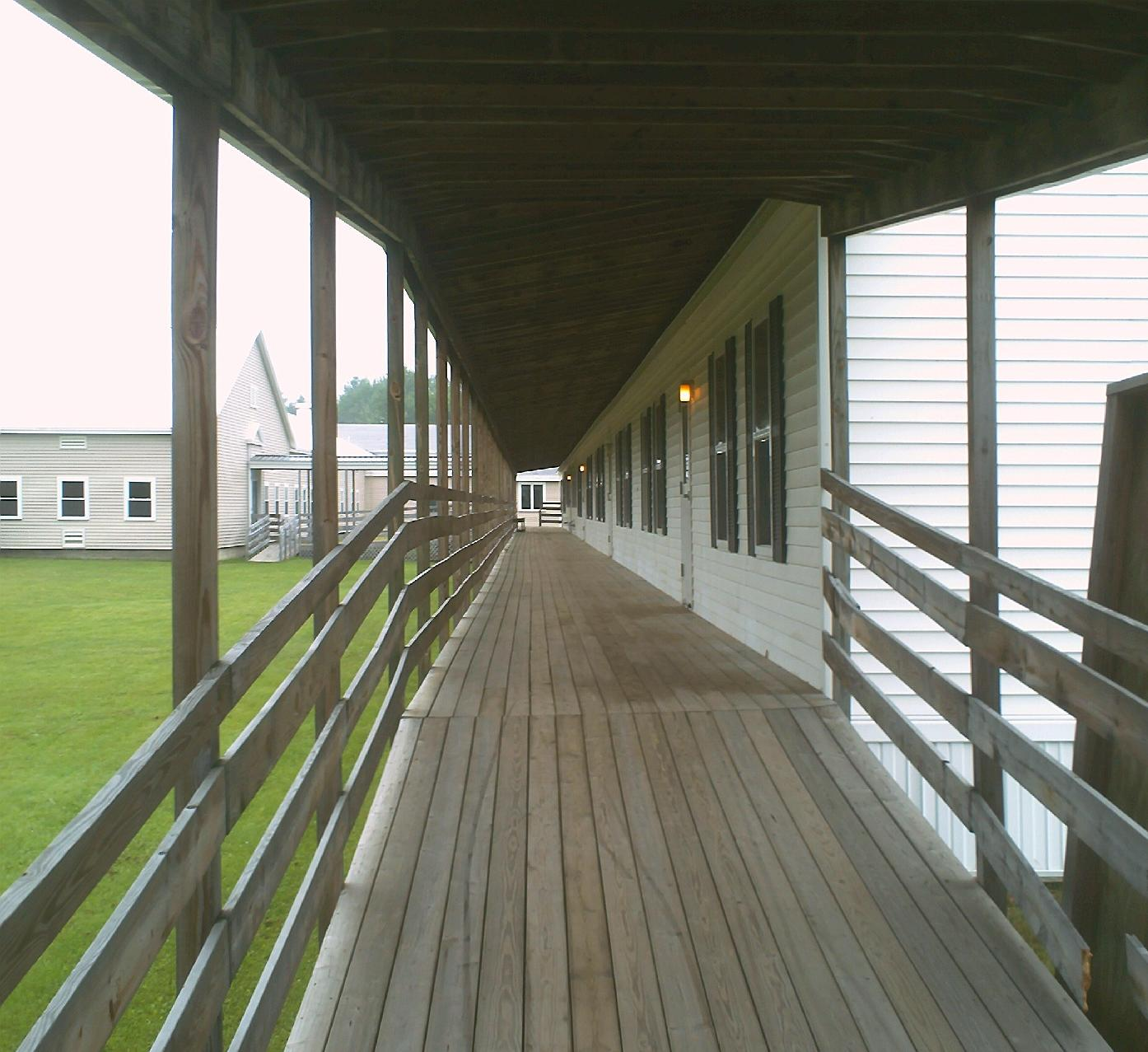
A view down the boardwalk.

"The Portables", are a series of portable classrooms connected by a covered boardwalk. Several district services are housed in the portables.

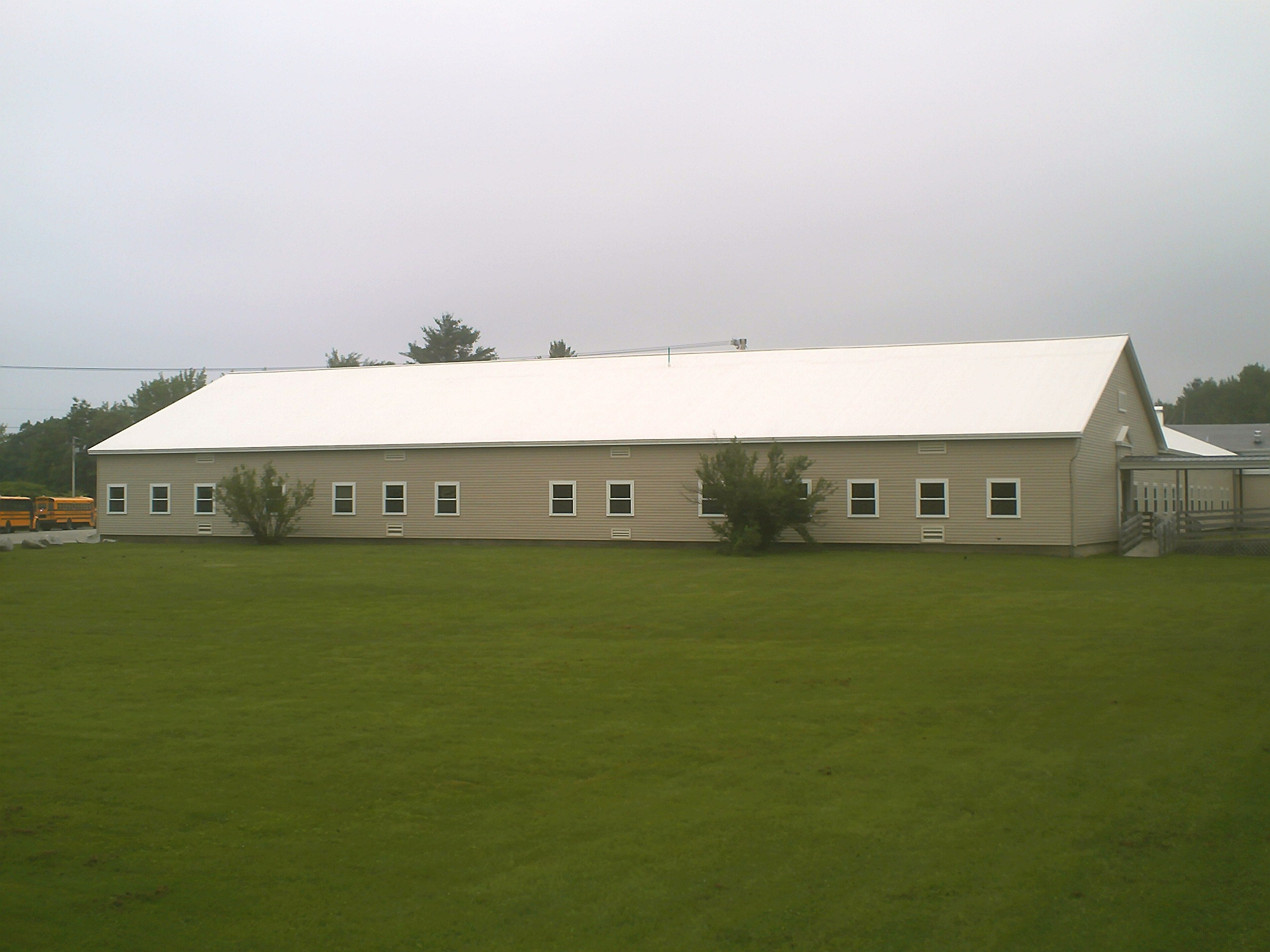
Outside Picture of PVHS after renovation

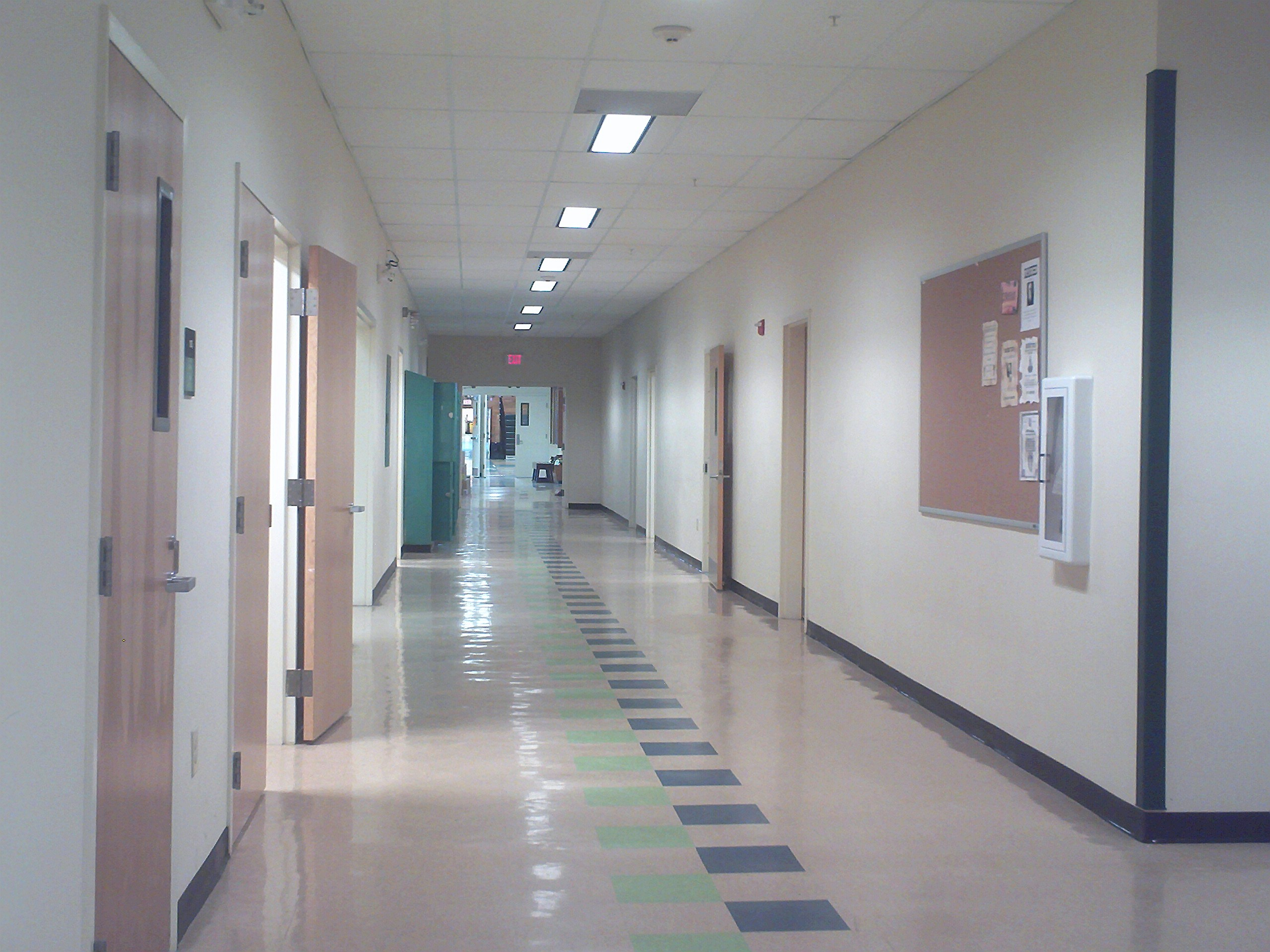
A view of the main hallway at PVHS
