= 2006 Maine gubernatorial election =

- November 7, 2006
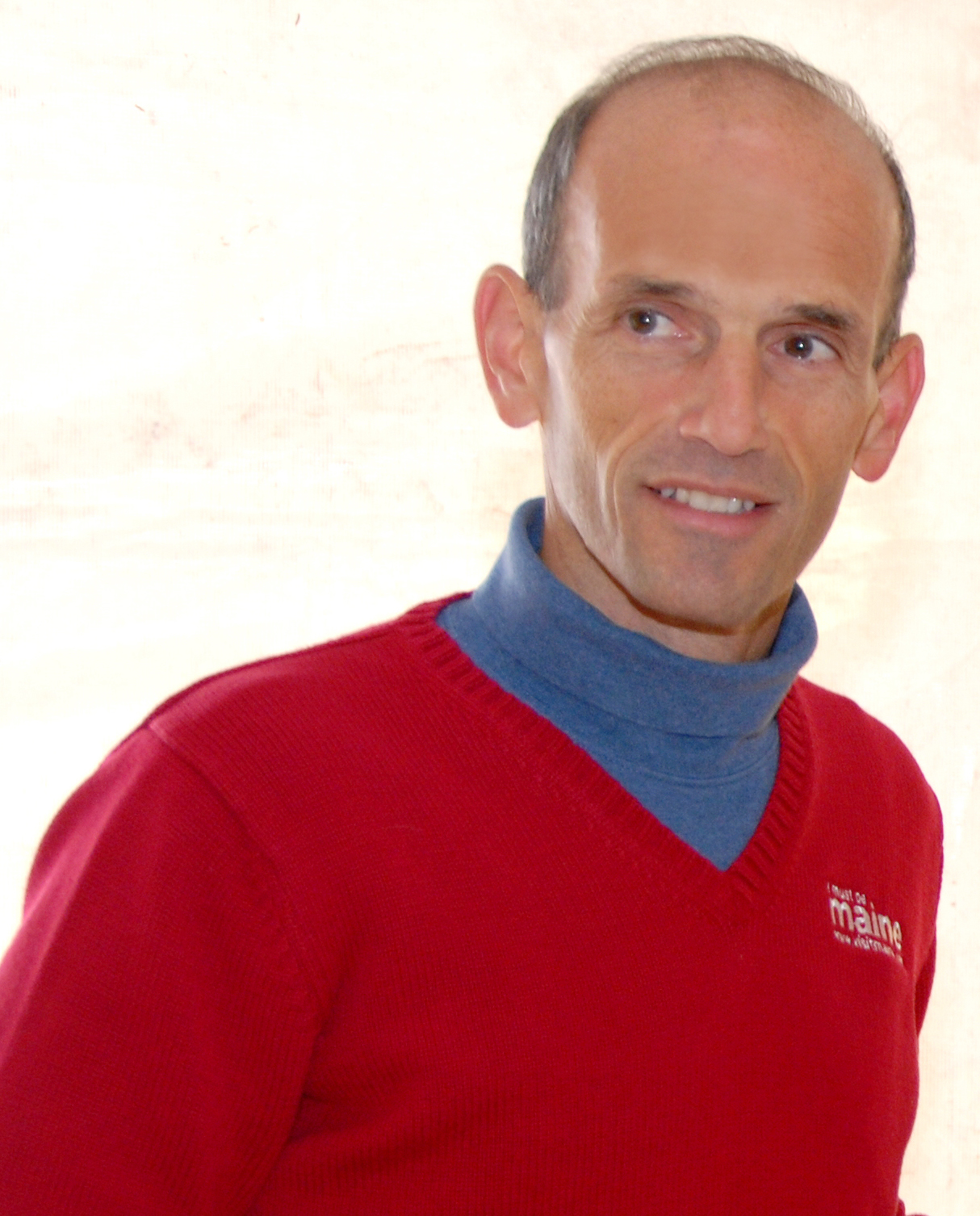

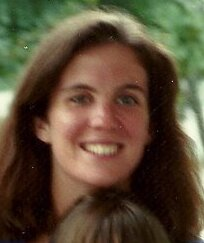
Nominee	John Baldacci	Chandler Woodcock
Party	Democratic	Republican
Popular vote	209,927	166,425
Percentage	38.11%	30.21%
Nominee	Barbara Merrill	Pat LaMarche
Party	Independent	Green
Popular vote	118,715	52,690
Percentage	21.55%	9.56%
- Baldacci: 20–30% 30–40% 40–50% 50–60% 60–70% 70–80% 80–90% Woodcock: 20–30% 30–40% 40–50% 50–60% 60–70% 70–80% Merrill: 30–40% 40–50% >90% LaMarche: 30–40% Tie: 20–30% 30–40%
Governor before election
John Baldacci
Democratic
Elected Governor
John Baldacci
Democratic

The 2006 Maine gubernatorial election took place on November 7, 2006, to elect the governor of Maine. Incumbent Democratic Governor John Baldacci won a second term, defeating Republican nominee Chandler Woodcock.

In the general election, Baldacci, Woodcock, Green Independent Party candidate Pat LaMarche, and independents Barbara Merrill and Phillip Morris Napier appeared on the ballot.

As of 2026, this is the last time Aroostook, Penobscot and Oxford counties did not vote for the Republican gubernatorial nominee. This is also the last time until 2026 that Androscoggin County did not vote for the Republican gubernatorial nominee.

== Democratic primary ==
=== Candidates ===
- John Baldacci, incumbent governor of Maine
- Christopher Miller, internet service provider

=== Results ===
Democratic primary results
Party	Candidate	Votes	%
Democratic	John Baldacci (incumbent)	40,314	75.81
Democratic	Christopher Miller	12,861	24.19
Total votes		53,175	100.00

== Republican primary ==
=== Candidates ===
- Dave Emery, former U.S. representative
- Peter Mills, state senator
- Chandler Woodcock, state senator

=== Results ===
Republican primary results
Party	Candidate	Votes	%
Republican	Chandler Woodcock	27,025	38.58
Republican	Peter Mills	24,631	35.17
Republican	Dave Emery	18,388	26.25
Total votes		70,044	100.00

== Green Independent Party ==
- Pat LaMarche, businesswoman, nominee for governor in 1998 and nominee for vice president of the United States in 2004

== Independents ==
Qualified for ballot

- Barbara Merrill, state representative
- Phillip Morris Napier, 2002 candidate for governor

Withdrawn

- David Jones, real estate executive
- John Michael, former state representative, 2002 candidate for governor

== General election ==
=== Predictions ===
Source	Ranking	As of
The Cook Political Report	Lean D	November 6, 2006
Sabato's Crystal Ball	Lean D	November 6, 2006
Rothenberg Political Report	Likely D	November 2, 2006
Real Clear Politics	Lean D	November 6, 2006

=== Polling ===
Source	Date	John Baldacci (D)	Chandler Woodcock (R)	Pat LaMarche (G)	Barbra Merrill (I)	Phillip Morris NaPier (I)
WCSH/Voice of the Voter	November 5, 2006	36%	30%	11%	22%	1%
Sun Journal	October 2006	42%	25%	11%	11%	–
Survey USA	October 23, 2006	42%	34%	9%	12%	
Rasmussen	October 19, 2006	46%	38%			
Rasmussen	September 22, 2006	44%	39%			
WCSH/Voice of the Voter	September 14, 2006	42%	41%			
Rasmussen	August 22, 2006	43%	42%			
Rasmussen	August 2, 2006	43%	37%			
Strategic Marketing Services	August 1, 2006	42%	24%			
Survey USA	July 11, 2006	41%	43%			
Rasmussen	June 22, 2006	45%	43%			
Rasmussen	May 7, 2006	46%	33%			
Rasmussen	April 7, 2006	43%	36%			
Rasmussen	March 6, 2006	40%	35%			
Rasmussen	February 6, 2006	30%	36%			

=== Results ===

Maine gubernatorial election, 2006
Party	Candidate	Votes	%	±%
Democratic	John Baldacci (incumbent)	209,927	38.11%	−9.04%
Republican	Chandler Woodcock	166,425	30.21%	−11.26%
Independent	Barbara Merrill	118,715	21.55%	
Green	Pat LaMarche	52,690	9.56%	+0.28%
Independent	Phillip Morris Napier	3,108	0.56%	
Plurality		43,502	7.90%	+2.22%
Turnout		550,865		
Democratic hold		Swing		

==== Results by county ====
County	John Baldacci Democratic		Chandler Woodock Republican		Barbara Merrill Independent		Patricia LaMarche Green		Others		Margin		Total votes cast
County	#	%	#	%	#	%	#	%	#	%	#	%	#
Androscoggin	13,631	33.3%	13,362	32.7%	9,805	24.0%	3,914	9.6%	204	0.5%	269	0.6%	40,916
Aroostook	12,752	48.4%	7,188	27.3%	3,803	14.4%	2,404	9.1%	184	0.7%	5,564	21.1%	26,331
Cumberland	48,449	39.8%	31,835	26.2%	27,613	22.7%	13,082	10.8%	668	0.5%	16,614	13.6%	121,647
Franklin	4,613	32.0%	5,920	41.1%	2,521	17.5%	1,270	8.8%	97	0.7%	-1,307	-9.1%	14,421
Hancock	10,138	40.3%	7,231	28.7%	5,319	21.1%	2,307	9.2%	160	0.6%	2,907	11.6%	25,155
Kennebec	18,765	36.5%	16,178	31.5%	10,748	20.9%	5,482	10.7%	251	0.5%	2,587	5.0%	51,424
Knox	6,506	35.1%	5,019	27.1%	5,056	27.3%	1,808	9.8%	140	0.8%	1,450	7.8% (Note: Compares margin over Merrill.)	18,259
Lincoln	5,825	33.0%	5,494	31.2%	4,537	25.7%	1,679	9.5%	96	0.5%	1,450	1.8%	18,259
Oxford	8,281	34.0%	7,771	31.9%	6,122	25.2%	2,036	8.4%	127	0.5%	510	2.1%	24,337
Penobscot	24,015	40.9%	19,100	32.5%	10,643	18.1%	4,677	8.0%	320	0.5%	4,915	8.4%	58,755
Piscataquis	2,591	34.5%	2,829	37.7%	1,476	19.7%	559	7.5%	47	0.6%	-238	-3.2%	7,502
Sagadahoc	5,962	35.1%	4,829	28.5%	4,316	25.4%	1,775	10.5%	86	0.5%	1,133	6.6%	16,968
Somerset	6,500	32.3%	7,393	36.7%	4,025	20.0%	2,084	10.3%	139	0.7%	-893	-4.4%	20,141
Waldo	5,678	33.5%	5,329	31.5%	4,143	24.5%	1,680	9.9%	108	0.6%	349	2.0%	16,938
Washington	3,897	29.3%	5,057	38.1%	3,002	22.6%	1,204	9.1%	119	0.9%	-1,160	-8.8%	13,279
York	32,324	42.0%	21,890	28.5%	15,591	20.3%	6,729	8.8%	362	0.5%	10,434	3.5%	76,896
Totals	209,927	38.1%	166,425	30.2%	118,715	21.6%	52,690	9.6%	3,108	0.6%	43,502	7.9%	550,865

Counties that flipped from Republican to Democratic

- Cumberland (largest municipality: Portland)
- Knox (largest municipality: Rockland)
- Lincoln (largest city: Waldoboro)
- Sagadahoc (largest town:Bath)
- York (largest town:Biddeford)

Counties that flipped from Democratic to Republican

- Franklin (largest town: Farmington)
- Piscataquis (largest municipality: Dover-Foxcroft)
- Somerset (largest town: Skowhegan)
- Washington (largest city: Calais)

== Analysis ==
Despite the divided field, Baldacci still finished nearly eight points ahead of his nearest challenger, Woodcock. Merrill took an impressive 21% of the vote, and carried the municipalities of Glenwood Plantation, Hope, Milton, Seboeis Plantation, Stow, The Forks, and Union. Additionally, the municipalities of Carroll Plantation, Dennysville, Wade, and Westmanland finished as exact ties between Baldacci and Woodcock, while the municipality of Highland Plantation finished as an exact tie between Baldacci and LaMarche, the municipality of Webster Plantation finished as an exact tie between Baldacci and Merrill, and the municipality of Nashville Plantation finished as an exact tie between Woodcock and Merrill.

Despite LaMarche getting nearly 10% of the vote and slightly improving on Jonathan Carter's vote percentage and vote total four years earlier, both of which were all-time highs for the Maine Green Independent Party, the 2006 election remains the most recent time the Greens ran a candidate for governor.

== See also ==
- 2006 United States gubernatorial elections
- 2006 United States Senate election in Maine
