= Chandler Woodcock =

American politician

Member of the Maine Senate from the 18th district
- In office 2004–2006
- Preceded by: Sharon Treat
- Succeeded by: Walter Gooley

Member of the Maine Senate from the 17th district
- In office 2000–2004
- Preceded by: John W. Benoit
- Succeeded by: John Nutting

Personal details
- Born: Mechanic Falls, Maine, U.S.
- Party: Republican
- Education: University of Maine, Farmington (BA)

Chandler E. Woodcock is an American politician from Maine. Woodcock served as a Republican State Senator from Franklin County from 2000 to 2006. He was the Republican candidate for Governor of Maine in 2006. He won a close primary election by 3% on June 13, 2006, against David F. Emery and Peter Mills. He lost to Governor John Baldacci, the Democratic incumbent in the November 7 election. In 2011, Republican Governor Paul LePage nominated Woodcock to be Maine's Commissioner of Inland Fisheries and Wildlife, and he took office in the spring of that year.

== Biography ==
Woodcock was born in Mechanic Falls, Maine, and grew up in Farmington, to a father who worked as a manager at the Forster Manufacturing Company and served in the Army Air Corps in World War II, and a mother who served as a United States Marine in World War II.

Woodcock enlisted in the Army after graduating from high school, and served a tour of duty during the Vietnam War. After returning home, he earned a bachelor's degree in Secondary Education from the University of Maine at Farmington and went on to teach high school in the public school system for the next 25 years, teaching at Livermore Falls High School, Mt. Blue High School, and Skowhegan Area High School. He also served as basketball coach at each school and led the Mount Blue High School girls' varsity basketball team to two Class A state championships.

Woodcock previously served for five years on the Board of Selectmen in Farmington (one year as Chairman of the Board), before being elected to the state Senate. During his first term, he served on the Inland Fisheries and Wildlife Committee and the Legal and Veterans' Affairs Committee; during his second term, he served as Assistant Senate Republican Leader and on the Judiciary Committee.

Woodcock made a bid for the Governorship of Maine in 2006 but was defeated by incumbent John Baldacci. Woodcock ran as a publicly financed Clean Elections candidate. In January, 2009, he became the executive director of the Maine Harness Horsemen's Association. He is also the co-host (with State Representative Tom Saviello of Wilton) of a Public-access television talk show on Mount Blue Community Access TV called "Talkin Maine With the Bow Tie Boys"; both Woodcock and Saviello are known locally for wearing bow ties.

Woodcock is married to his wife Charlotte with whom he has three daughters and a son.

== Electoral history ==
2006 Maine Gubernatorial Election
Candidate	Party	Votes	Pct
General Election
John E. Baldacci (inc.)	Democratic	206,811	38.03%
Chandler Woodcock	Republican	164,789	30.30%
Barbara Merrill	Ind.	117,079	21.53%
Pat LaMarche	Green	51,992	9.56%
Phillip NaPier	Ind.	3,179	0.58%
Primary
Chandler Woodcock	Republican	27,025	38.6%
Peter Mills	Republican	24,631	35.2%
David F. Emery	Republican	18,388	26.3%

Maine Senate
Preceded by John W. Benoit	Member of the Maine Senate from the 17th district 2000–2004	Succeeded by John Nutting
Preceded by Sharon Treat	Member of the Maine Senate from the 18th district 2004–2006	Succeeded by Walter Gooley
Party political offices
Preceded by Peter Cianchette	Republican nominee for Governor of Maine; 2006	Succeeded by Paul LePage
