= David F. Emery =

American politician from Maine

Dave Emery
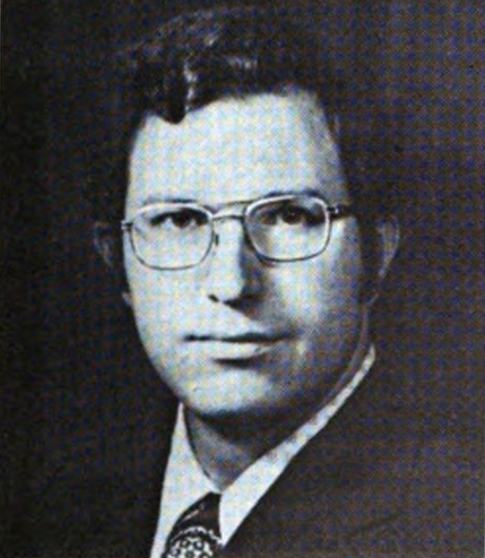

House Republican Chief Deputy Whip
- In office January 3, 1981 – January 3, 1983
- Leader: Bob Michel
- Preceded by: Position established
- Succeeded by: Tom Loeffler

Member of the U.S. House of Representatives from Maine's 1st district
- In office January 3, 1975 – January 3, 1983
- Preceded by: Peter Kyros
- Succeeded by: Jock McKernan

Member of the Maine House of Representatives from the Rockland district
- In office January 6, 1971 – January 1, 1975
- Preceded by: Paul Huber
- Succeeded by: Constituency abolished

Personal details
- Born: David Farnham Emery; September 1, 1948 (age 77) Rockland, Maine, U.S.
- Party: Republican
- Education: Worcester Polytechnic Institute (BSc)

David Farnham Emery (born September 1, 1948) is an American politician from Maine. He served four terms as a Republican U.S. representative from 1975 to 1983.

== Early life and education ==
Emery grew up in Rockland before attending college at Worcester Polytechnic Institute, where he received a BS in electrical engineering in 1970. Upon graduating, he entered politics.

== Political career ==
=== Maine House of Representatives ===
He served in the Maine House of Representatives 1970–1974 and was active in the Republican Party.

=== Congress ===
In 1974, Emery ran for the United States House of Representatives against incumbent Democrat Peter Kyros and won in an upset, one of only a handful of Republican gains in a year when Democrats gained 49 seats in the House of Representatives. He was reelected in 1976, 1978, and 1980.

He served as a member of the Merchant Marine and Fisheries Committee for all four terms; on the Science and Technology Committee in the 94th congress (1975–1977); and on the House Armed Services Committee during the 95th, 96th and 97th Congresses (1977–1983). He was a member of the House Republican leadership during the 97th Congress, serving as Chief Deputy Republican Whip under Trent Lott.

=== 1982 Senate campaign ===
In 1982, he ran for the U.S. Senate against Democratic Senator George J. Mitchell, a former Federal Judge who had been appointed to succeed Democrat Edmund Muskie, whom President Jimmy Carter had appointed as U.S. Secretary of State. Emery was initially thought to be the favorite, but he ran a highly critical campaign which made a negative impression, and Mitchell won the election with 61% of the vote. He would lose 15 of the 16 counties in the state, carrying only his native Knox County.

=== 2005 campaign for governor ===
In 2005 he declared his candidacy for Governor of Maine in the 2006 election. He withdrew from the race upon the entrance of 2002 nominee Peter Cianchette, but following Cianchette's withdrawal, re-entered. In the Republican primary he came in last of the three candidates on the ballot, finishing behind State Senators Chandler Woodcock of Farmington and Peter Mills of Skowhegan. Woodcock, the nominee, lost to incumbent Democrat John Baldacci in the November 2006 general election. Emery was endorsed by U.S. Senator John McCain for Governor, who urged voters to vote for Emery in the primary.

== Later life ==
Emery endorsed Mitt Romney for President in the 2012 election. He would cross party lines to endorse Democrat Kamala Harris in the 2024 presidential election.

In April 2011, Emery was appointed Deputy Commissioner of Administrative and Financial Services by Governor of Maine Paul LePage. In August 2012, Emery resigned from the position with no explanation given.

In July 2016, Emery was chosen to run for a Maine State Senate seat against incumbent Democrat David Miramant of Camden. He was unsuccessful, receiving 48% of the vote to Miramant's 52%.

Emery is a member of the ReFormers Caucus of Issue One.

U.S. House of Representatives
Preceded by Peter Kyros	Member of the U.S. House of Representatives from Maine's 1st congressional district 1975–1983	Succeeded by Jock McKernan
Party political offices
New office	House Republican Chief Deputy Whip; 1981–1983	Succeeded by Tom Loeffler
Preceded by Robert A. G. Monks	Republican nominee for U.S. Senator from Maine (Class 1); 1982	Succeeded by Jasper Wyman
U.S. order of precedence (ceremonial)
Preceded by Artur Davis as Former U.S. Representative	Order of precedence of the United States as Former U.S. Representative	Succeeded by James W. Symington as Former U.S. Representative
