= John Baldacci =

American politician (born 1955)

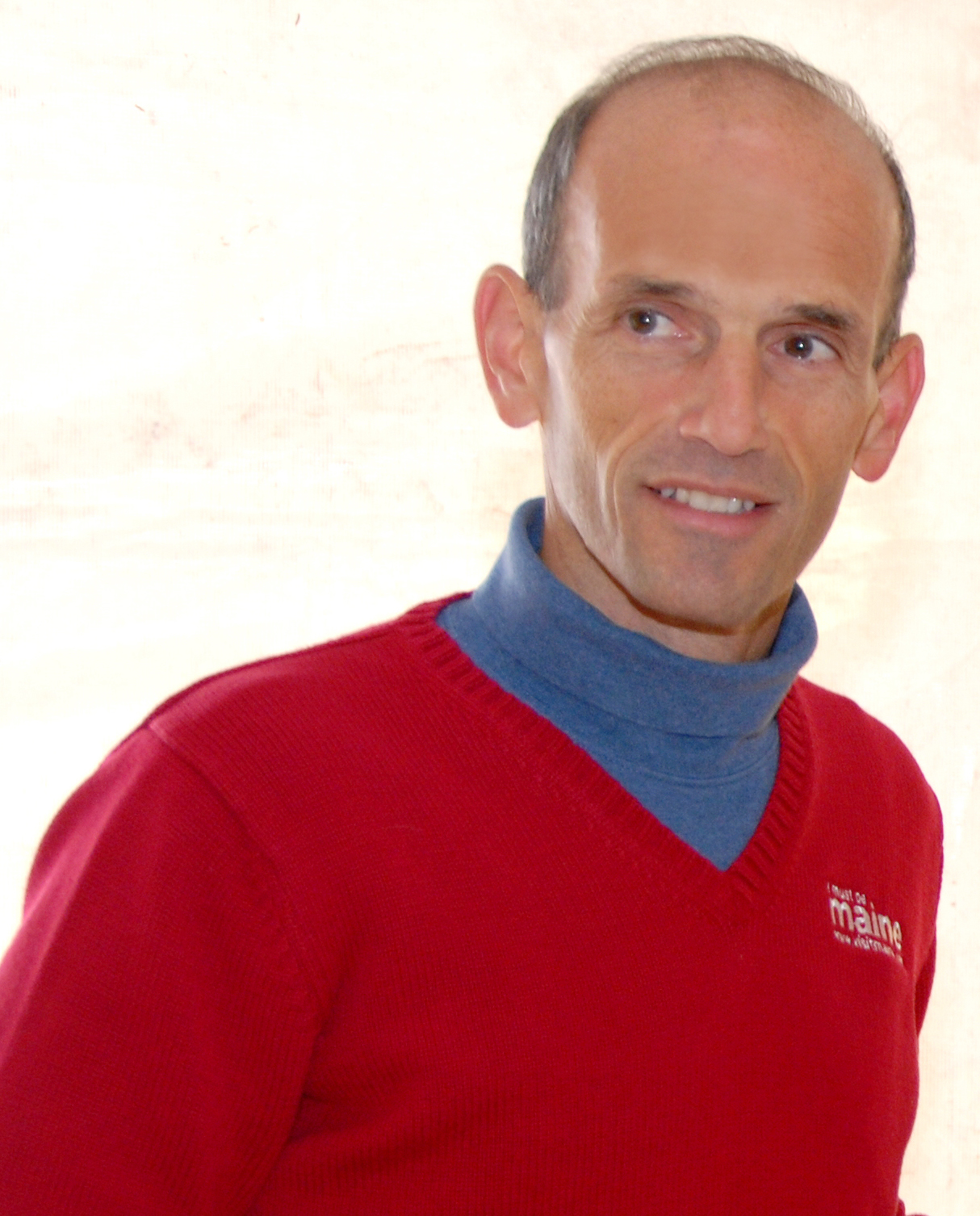

73rd Governor of Maine
- In office January 8, 2003 – January 5, 2011
- Preceded by: Angus King
- Succeeded by: Paul LePage

Member of the U.S. House of Representatives from Maine's 2nd district
- In office January 3, 1995 – January 3, 2003
- Preceded by: Olympia Snowe
- Succeeded by: Mike Michaud

Member of the Maine Senate from the 9th district
- In office December 1, 1982 – December 7, 1994
- Preceded by: Constituency established
- Succeeded by: Sean Faircloth

Personal details
- Born: John Elias Baldacci; January 30, 1955 (age 71) Bangor, Maine, U.S.
- Party: Democratic
- Spouse: Karen Baldacci
- Children: 1
- Relatives: Joe Baldacci (brother); George J. Mitchell (first cousin once removed); David Baldacci (second cousin)
- Education: University of Maine (BA)

John Elias Baldacci (born January 30, 1955) is an American politician who served as the 73rd governor of Maine from 2003 to 2011. A Democrat, he also served in the United States House of Representatives from 1995 to 2003 and in the Maine Senate from 1982 to 1994.

During his tenure as governor, Baldacci initiated reforms in the areas of health care, energy development, administrative reform and efficiency, public education, and led significant efforts to expand investment in workforce training and development. During his four terms in the U.S. Congress, he served on the Agriculture Committee and the Committee on Transportation and Infrastructure. He served previously as Vice-Chair and currently as Chair Emeritus of the board of the non-partisan Northeast-Midwest Institute, a Washington-based, private, nonprofit, and nonpartisan research organization dedicated to economic vitality, environmental quality, and regional equity for Northeast and Midwest states.

== Early life and political career ==
Born in Bangor, Maine, on January 30, 1955, Baldacci grew up with seven siblings in a Roman Catholic family of Italian and Lebanese ancestry. As a child, he worked in the family business, Momma Baldacci's restaurant in Bangor. A 1973 graduate of Bangor High School, he received a B.A. degree in history from the University of Maine at Orono in 1986.

Baldacci was first elected to public office in 1978 at the age of 23, when he served on the Bangor City Council. He continued in politics, winning election to the Maine Senate in 1982 from a Bangor-area district. He was reelected two times, serving a total of 12 years.

== United States House of Representatives ==
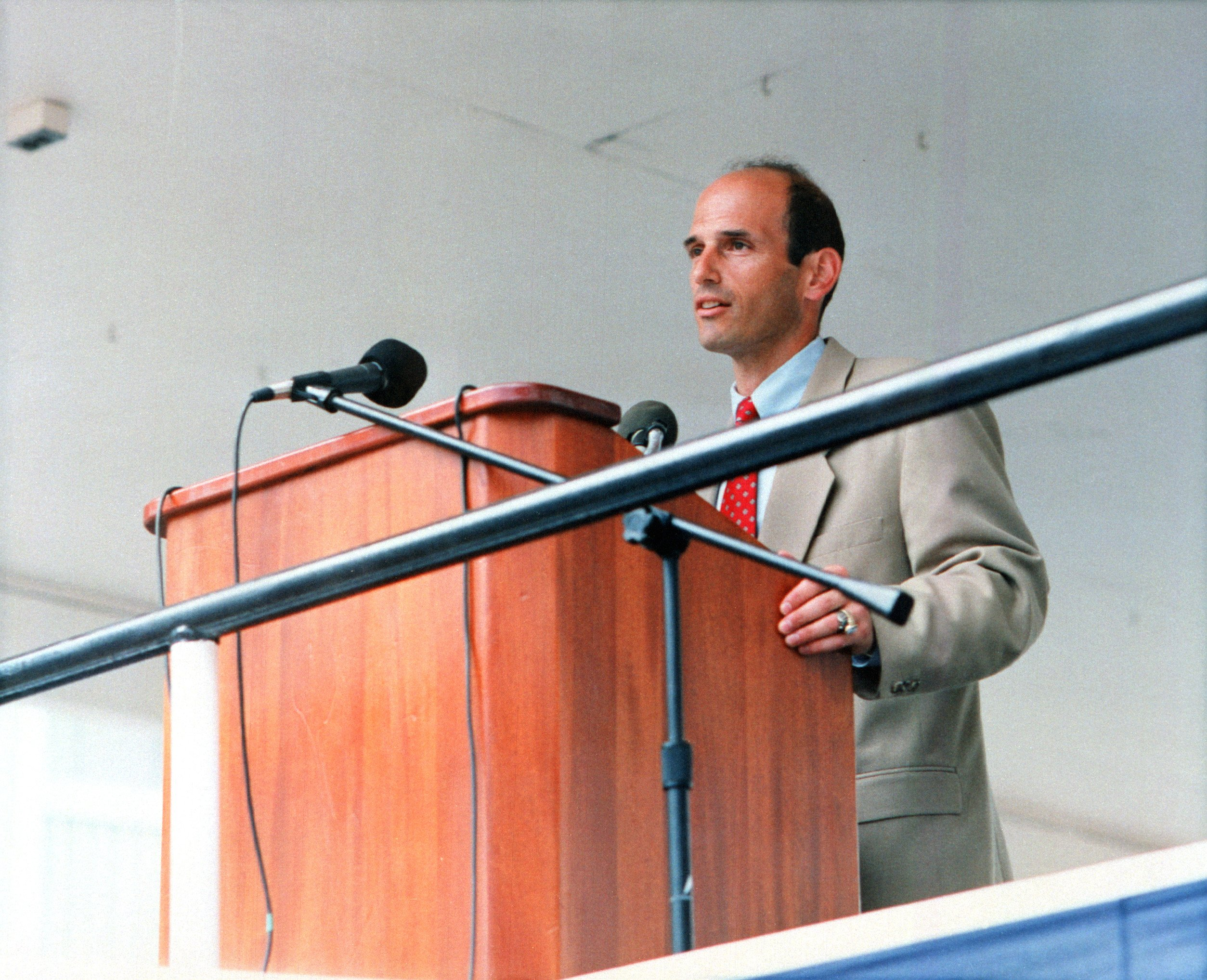
Baldacci giving a speech in Bath, Maine, on August 12, 1995

In 1994, following the retirement of his cousin, United States Senator George J. Mitchell, Baldacci won election to the U.S. House of Representatives from Maine's Second District, replacing Olympia Snowe, who had moved on to Mitchell's open Senate seat. He defeated fellow state senator Rick Bennett in one of the few Democratic pickups of the 1994 cycle, taking 47 percent to Bennett's 41 percent.

Baldacci would never face another contest nearly that close, and was reelected to Congress three times with well over 70 percent of the vote. He served on the House Agriculture Committee and the House Transportation Committee.

== Governor of Maine ==
=== 2002 election ===
A Democrat, Baldacci was first elected in the 2002 gubernatorial election in Maine with 47.2% of the vote. He defeated Republican nominee Peter Cianchette, who garnered 41.5% of the vote, Green Independent nominee Jonathan Carter, who received 9%, and unenrolled former Democrat John Michael, who received 2%. Baldacci was sworn in as Maine's governor on January 8, 2003. In 2006, Baldacci won re-election from a field of four major candidates. As governor, he was a member of the National Governors Association and the Democratic Governors Association.

=== First term ===
After being elected, Baldacci attempted to fill a $1.2-billion deficit. This was done through budget cuts, consolidation, and fee increases. Baldacci refused to raise broad-based taxes, honoring a campaign pledge. Baldacci won approval for major initiatives including Dirigo Health, the Maine Community College System, and Pine Tree Development Zones (PTDZ).

Pine Tree Development Zones were enacted in 2004 and offered eligible businesses the chance to greatly reduce or virtually eliminate state taxes for up to ten years when they create new, quality jobs in certain business sectors or move existing jobs in those sectors to Maine. However, a report released in 2014 showed that the PTDZ program was ineffective, costing state government more than it brought in. Over the first ten years of the program, it cost Maine $457 million.

Baldacci's overhaul of the healthcare system was established with his Dirigo Health Care Act. The program offers subsidised health care to individuals and Maine businesses with fewer than 50 employees. The program expanded wellness centers across the state. Individuals in the system enjoy preventive care when most other insurance policies rejected people with pre-existing conditions. Proponents claim that the preventive care eventually lowers health care costs.

With the Maine Community College System he took technical colleges and revamped them into community colleges by adding more courses, more teachers and programs relevant to the communities in which they were established. He passed legislation that made it possible for credits and degrees from the community colleges to be transferable to the University of Maine System if student wished to pursue a four-year degree. The community college system grew exponentially adding new satellites. In their first three years, Maine's community colleges grew 42 percent. The demand is so great there are wait lists for admission.

In 2005, Baldacci introduced legislation to expand Maine's civil rights law to prohibit discrimination based on sexual orientation and on gender identity. This legislation in Maine had been defeated via referendum by voters two times before. The law passed, but opponents of the law initiated a referendum to overturn the law. Voters upheld the new law.

Baldacci is a supporter of regionalization, a sometimes contentious policy of merging services of local governments to save money on administrative costs.

=== 2006 election ===
Baldacci ran for reelection in 2006, facing opposition from Republican state Senator Chandler Woodcock, Independents Barbara Merrill and Phillip Napier, and Green Independent Party candidate Pat LaMarche.

Democratic-leaning voters had a wide array of choices. Merrill, who was elected to her state house seat as a Democrat, Woodcock, and LaMarche received money from Maine's Clean Elections law. Merrill and LaMarche were generally seen as taking votes from Baldacci, while Woodcock's socially conservative position prompted some longtime Republicans to throw their votes to Baldacci, Merrill, or LaMarche.

Baldacci won the election with 38.11% of the vote. Woodcock placed second with 30%. Merrill received a surprising 21%, narrowly defeating Baldacci among unenrolled voters. LaMarche finished with 10%, enough to maintain ballot access for the Green Party.

=== Second term ===
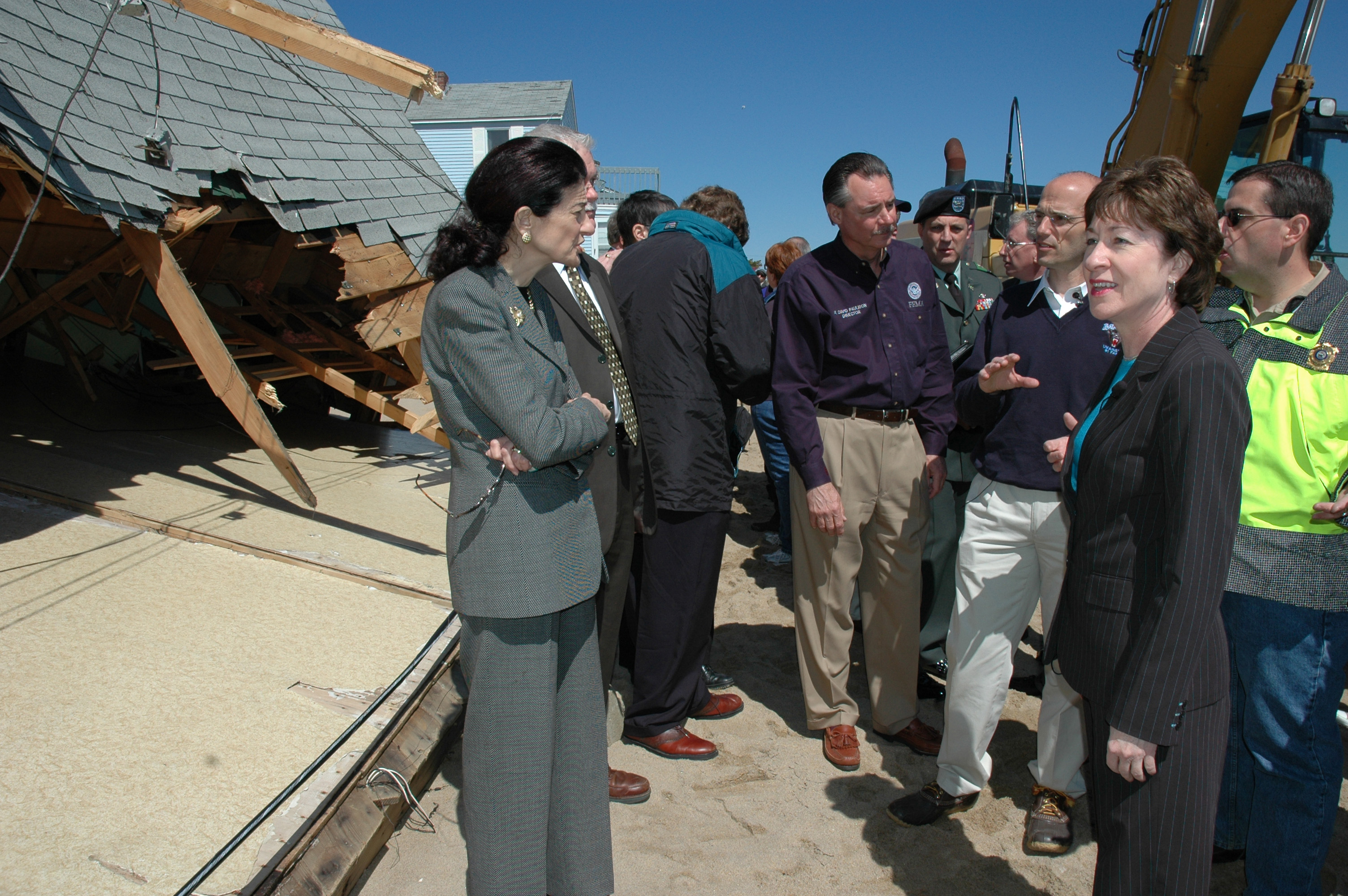
Baldacci touring damaged areas of Maine on April 20, 2007, with U.S. senators Olympia Snowe (left) and Susan Collins (right)

Baldacci was inaugurated on January 3, 2007, in Augusta. Baldacci, in his second term, built on the foundation he created in his first four years in office. He increased Maine's competitiveness in the global economy; streamlined government services; attracted good jobs; and ensured that all Mainers have access to quality education, workforce training, and health care. In 2008 the recession hit forcing more consolidation efforts and Baldacci never increased state income taxes. He left office with a surplus and a rainy day fund.

During his inaugural speech, Baldacci reaffirmed his goal for school administration consolidation. Shortly after he began his second term, his biennial budget proposal included consolidating Maine's 152 school districts into 26 regional school units. Maine has four forms of government: state, county, local towns and school administration districts. Consolidation of the school administration districts led to cutting back jobs that were duplicated and the savings were then put back into the classrooms.

In 2007, Baldacci announced a plan to send 125 Maine prisoners to the private Corrections Corporation of America called North Fork Correctional Facility in Sayre, Oklahoma, to ease crowding at the Maine State Prison in Warren. Critics, such as the Maine Civil Liberties Union called for supervised release of non-violent prisoners and sentence commutation for model inmates to ease overcrowding instead. The proposal was killed by the Maine Legislature. However, in 2009, Baldacci's administration again suggested that the state could relocate prisoners to Oklahoma. The owner and operator of the Oklahoma prison, Corrections Corporation of America, indirectly contributed to Baldacci's re-election campaign and hired Baldacci's cousin and advisor, Jim Mitchell, as a lobbyist.

Baldacci continued a major effort to promote alternative energies and energy independence for the state. Maine homes and businesses were heated 86 percent with oil. As of 2011, that declined to 76 percent. Baldacci's programs promoted wood pellets, which were manufactured in the state using Maine's vast forest lands, as well as wind, solar, biofuels and wave technologies. He also started the Energy Efficiency Trust. He successfully created new standards and goals for the states Renewable Portfolio Standards (RPS). These RPS standards encouraged alternative energy suppliers to invest in Maine using the state's natural resources sustainably. Offshore wind technologies for floating wind turbines developed at the University of Maine brought Energy Sec. Steven Chu to visit the University and the Department of Energy has given the university various grants to continue the research.

Baldacci also brought the region's leaders together for a special conference to coordinate and cooperate on regional energy efforts such as the infrastructure needed to carry the electricity to markets. In addition Baldacci led the effort for Maine to become part of the first cap and trade state consortium for East coast states called the Regional Greenhouse Gas Initiative, which has brought in $83 million to the state for weatherization programs.

Throughout Baldacci's eight years he promoted a number of bond efforts that were passed by the people of Maine to increase research and development in the state focusing on sectors of growth and innovation. These bonds helped to transform research and development in biomedicine, composites and forest products at Maine's leading educational institutions.

In February 2008, Baldacci hosted an official visit to Maine by Premier of New Brunswick, Shawn Graham, which was the first official visit to Maine by an incumbent head of a Canadian province. In his visit, Graham addressed a joint session of the Maine Legislature in which he proposed increasing cross-border trade, tourism, transportation as well as additional co-operation on energy and education.

In the 2008 Democratic Presidential primary Baldacci, as a superdelegate, pledged his support for Hillary Clinton despite Barack Obama winning the state's Democratic Presidential Primary. By June 2008, it was clear that Obama would be the nominee and he announced his support for Obama.

On May 6, 2009, Baldacci signed legislation legalizing same-sex marriage in Maine. This made him the first governor ever in the U.S. to sign a same-sex marriage bill into law where it was not previously court-ordered. (The Governor of Connecticut, Mary Jodi Rell, had been the first to sign a bill codifying same-sex marriage into law on April 23, 2009.) Maine's legalization of same-sex marriage was narrowly overturned by a statewide referendum vote on November 3, 2009, but brought back on a pro–same-sex marriage referendum on November 6, 2012, and became law.

Baldacci left office in 2011, and he was succeeded by Republican Paul LePage.

== Personal life and family ==
Baldacci lived with his wife Karen and son Jack in the Blaine House in Augusta while governor.

Baldacci's brother, Joe, is a member of the Maine Senate. He is a first cousin once removed of former Maine senator and majority leader George J. Mitchell and a second cousin of author David Baldacci. In addition, he is also related to State Representative Chris Greeley, who like Baldacci and Mitchell, is half-Lebanese. His wife Karen was the head of Maine Reads, a nonprofit umbrella organization for Read With ME, privately funded by Verizon. Karen now works as a registered dietitian (RD) at the Supplemental Program for Women Infants and Children (WIC) in Portland.

Baldacci held a technician class amateur radio license with call sign KB1NXP, which expired in 2018.

== Electoral history ==
Maine's 2nd congressional district: Results 1994–2000
Year	Democrat	Votes	Pct	Republican	Votes	Pct	3rd Party	Party	Votes	Pct	3rd Party	Party	Votes	Pct	
1994	John Baldacci	109,615	46%	Rick Bennett	97,754	41%	John M. Michael	Independent	21,117	9%	Charles Fitzgerald	Maine Green Independent	11,353	5%	*
1996	John Baldacci	205,439	72%	Paul R. Young	70,856	25%	Aldric Saucier	Independent	9,294	3%					*
1998	John Baldacci	146,202	76%	Jonathan Reisman	45,674	24%									
2000	John Baldacci	219,783	73%	Richard H. Campbell	79,522	27%									

*Write-in and minor candidate notes: In 1994, write-ins received 55 votes. In 1996, write-ins received 47 votes.

2002 Maine gubernatorial election
Party	Candidate	Votes	%	±%
Democratic	John Baldacci	233,543	47.2	
Republican	Peter Cianchette	205,335	41.5	
Green	Jonathan Carter	46,903	9.28	

2006 Maine gubernatorial election
Party	Candidate	Votes	%	±%
Democratic	John Baldacci (Incumbent)	206,991	38.0	−9.2
Republican	Chandler Woodcock	164,861	30.3	
Independent	Barbara Merrill	117,111	21.5	
Green	Pat LaMarche	52,150	9.6	

== See also ==
- List of Arab and Middle-Eastern Americans in the United States Congress

U.S. House of Representatives
Preceded by Olympia Snowe	Member of the U.S. House of Representatives from Maine's 2nd congressional district 1995–2003	Succeeded by Mike Michaud
Party political offices
Preceded by Thomas Connolly	Democratic nominee for Governor of Maine; 2002, 2006	Succeeded by Libby Mitchell
Political offices
Preceded by Angus King	Governor of Maine; 2003–2011	Succeeded by Paul LePage
U.S. order of precedence (ceremonial)
Preceded by John R. McKernan Jr. as Former Governor	Order of precedence of the United States	Succeeded by Paul LePage as Former Governor
