= John Clemente (politician) =

American politician (1945–2023)

Member of the Executive Council of Maine from the 2nd district
- In office January 2, 1975 – January 4, 1977
- Governor: James B. Longley
- Preceded by: Deane A. Durgin
- Succeeded by: Office abolished
- Constituency: Cumberland County

Member of the Maine House of Representatives from Portland
- In office January 6, 1971 – January 3, 1973
- Preceded by: Abraham Leibowitz
- Succeeded by: Thomas R. LaPointe

Personal details
- Born: John Francis Clemente; April 10, 1945 Portland, Maine, U.S.
- Died: November 12, 2023 (aged 78) Portland, Maine, U.S.
- Party: Democratic
- Education: Gorham State College

John Francis Clemente (April 10, 1945 – November 12, 2023) was an American politician who served as a member of the Executive Council of Maine from 1975 until the body's abolition in 1977. A member of the Democratic Party, he previously served in the Maine House of Representatives.

Maine House of Representatives
Preceded by Abraham Leibowitz	Member of the Maine House of Representatives from Portland; 1971–1973	Succeeded by Thomas R. LaPointe
Political offices
Preceded by Deane A. Durgin	Member of the Executive Council of Maine from the 2nd district 1975–1977	Office abolished
