= Harvey Johnson (Maine politician) =

American politician (1911–1998)

Chair of the Executive Council of Maine
- In office January 4, 1973 – January 2, 1975
- Governor: Kenneth M. Curtis
- Vice Chair: Herald J. Beckett
- Preceded by: Edmund C. Darey
- Succeeded by: Carl Cianchette

Member of the Executive Council of Maine from the 4th district
- In office January 4, 1973 – January 2, 1975
- Governor: Kenneth M. Curtis
- Preceded by: Kenneth Robinson
- Succeeded by: Carl Cianchette
- Constituency: Kennebec and Somerset

Member of the Maine Senate
- In office January 6, 1971 – January 3, 1973
- Preceded by: Carl Cianchette
- Succeeded by: Cyril M. Joly Jr.
- Constituency: 22nd district
- In office January 4, 1967 – January 1, 1969
- Preceded by: James M. Cahill
- Succeeded by: Carl Cianchette
- Constituency: 22nd district
- In office January 2, 1963 – January 6, 1965 Serving with Lloyd H. Stitham
- Preceded by: Miles F. Carpenter
- Succeeded by: James M. Cahill
- Constituency: Somerset County

Member of the Maine House of Representatives from the Anson, Mercer, Norridgewock, Smithfield, and Starks district
- In office January 4, 1961 – January 2, 1963
- Preceded by: Ralph Hilton
- Succeeded by: Murray Hendsbee

Personal details
- Born: Harvey Bevis Johnson; September 9, 1911 Wilmington, Delaware, U.S.
- Died: March 4, 1998 (aged 86) Augusta, Maine, U.S.
- Party: Republican
- Spouse: Evelyn Hales Gilmore (m. 1942; died 1997)

Military service
- Branch/service: United States Army; Army Ground Forces
- Years of service: 1941‍–‍1946
- Battles/wars: World War II; Pacific theater; Attack on Pearl Harbor; European theater
- Awards: Bronze Star Medal; Purple Heart

Harvey Bevis Johnson (September 9, 1911 – March 4, 1998) was an American politician who served as a member of the Executive Council of Maine from 1973 to 1975. He was the penultimate chairman of the Council before its 1977 abolition. A member of the Republican Party, he previously served in the Maine House of Representatives and Maine Senate.

Political offices
Preceded by Kenneth Robinson	Member of the Executive Council of Maine from the 4th district 1973–1975	Succeeded by Carl Cianchette
Preceded by Edmund C. Darey	Chair of the Executive Council of Maine; 1973–1975	Succeeded by Carl Cianchette
