= Edmund C. Darey =

American politician (1906–1983)

Chair of the Executive Council of Maine
- In office January 7, 1971 – January 4, 1973
- Governor: Kenneth M. Curtis
- Vice Chair: Walter W. Cameron
- Preceded by: Kenneth Robinson
- Succeeded by: Harvey Johnson

Member of the Executive Council of Maine from the 3rd district
- In office January 2, 1969 – January 4, 1973
- Governor: Kenneth M. Curtis
- Preceded by: Richard G. Morton
- Succeeded by: Howard W. Mayo
- Constituency: Sagadahoc, Androscoggin, and Franklin

Member of the Maine House of Representatives from the Livermore, Livermore Falls, and Turner district
- In office January 4, 1967 – January 1, 1969
- Preceded by: Forest S. Gilbert
- Succeeded by: Forest S. Gilbert

Personal details
- Born: Edmund Charles Darey; May 17, 1906 Lenox, Massachusetts, U.S.
- Died: February 18, 1983 (aged 76) Farmington, Maine, U.S.
- Party: Republican
- Spouse: Frances Smith (m. 1931)
- Education: Northeastern University (LLB)
- Occupation: Lawyer; judge; politician

Military service
- Branch/service: Maine State Guard
- Rank: Captain
- Battles/wars: World War II; American theater

Edmund Charles Darey (May 17, 1906 – February 18, 1983) was an American lawyer and politician who served as a member of the Executive Council of Maine from 1969 to 1973. He was chairman of the council during his second and final term. A member of the Republican Party, he previously served in the Maine House of Representatives.

Maine House of Representatives
Preceded by Forest S. Gilbert	Member of the Maine House of Representatives from the Livermore, Livermore Falls, and Turner district 1967–1969	Succeeded by Forest S. Gilbert
Political offices
Preceded by Richard G. Morton	Member of the Executive Council of Maine from the 3rd district 1969–1973	Succeeded by Howard W. Mayo
Preceded by Kenneth Robinson	Chair of the Executive Council of Maine; 1971–1973	Succeeded by Harvey Johnson
