= Carl Cianchette =

American politician (1919–1997)

Chair of the Executive Council of Maine
- In office January 2, 1975 – January 4, 1977
- Governor: James B. Longley
- Vice Chair: David Redmond
- Preceded by: Harvey Johnson
- Succeeded by: Office abolished

Member of the Executive Council of Maine from the 4th district
- In office January 2, 1975 – January 4, 1977
- Governor: James B. Longley
- Preceded by: Harvey Johnson
- Succeeded by: Office abolished
- Constituency: Kennebec and Somerset
- In office January 6, 1965 – January 5, 1967
- Governor: John H. Reed
- Preceded by: John L. Baxter Jr.
- Succeeded by: Kenneth Robinson
- Constituency: Kennebec and Somerset

Member of the Maine Senate from the 22nd district
- In office January 1, 1969 – January 6, 1971
- Preceded by: Harvey Johnson
- Succeeded by: Harvey Johnson

Member of the Maine House of Representatives from the Detroit, Palmyra, and Pittsfield district
- In office January 5, 1955 – January 2, 1957
- Preceded by: Clair Cianchette
- Succeeded by: Carl A. Emery

Personal details
- Born: Carl Ervin Cianchette; August 27, 1919 Pittsfield, Maine, U.S.
- Died: April 21, 1997 (aged 77) St. Petersburg, Florida, U.S.
- Party: Democratic
- Spouse: Maureen Davis (died 1994)
- Relatives: Clair Cianchette (brother); Chuck Cianchette (brother); Peter Cianchette (nephew)

Military service
- Branch/service: U.S. Merchant Marine
- Battles/wars: World War II; Battle of the Atlantic

Carl Ervin Cianchette (August 27, 1919 – April 21, 1997) was an American politician who served as a member of the Executive Council of Maine from 1965 to 1967 and from 1975 until the body's abolition in 1977. He was the last chairman of the Council. A member of the Democratic Party, he previously served in the Maine House of Representatives and Maine Senate.

Maine House of Representatives
Preceded by Clair Cianchette	Member of the Maine House of Representatives from the Detroit, Palmyra, and Pittsfield district 1955–1957	Succeeded by Carl A. Emery
Maine Senate
Preceded by Harvey Johnson	Member of the Maine Senate from the 22nd district 1969–1971	Succeeded by Harvey Johnson
Political offices
Preceded by Harvey Johnson	Member of the Executive Council of Maine from the 4th district 1975–1977	Office abolished
Preceded by Harvey Johnson	Chair of the Executive Council of Maine; 1975–1977	Office abolished
