= South Franklin =

South Franklin may refer to:

- South Franklin, Maine
- South Franklin Township, Pennsylvania
