= Kathleen R. Cho =

American gynecological surgical pathologist

- Born: Los Alamos, New Mexico, U.S.
- Spouse: Eric Fearon

Academic background
- Education: BA, 1980, Yale University; MD, 1984, Vanderbilt University School of Medicine

Kathleen R. Cho is an American gynecological surgical pathologist. She is a Professor of Pathology and Internal Medicine at Michigan Medicine.

== Early life and education ==
Cho was born in Los Alamos, New Mexico, and grew up in Rockville, Maryland. Cho received her Bachelor of Arts degree from Yale University in 1980 and her medical degree from Vanderbilt University School of Medicine in 1984. Following this, she completed her Anatomic Pathology residency at the Johns Hopkins Hospital and served as Chief Resident in her final year. During her residency, she simultaneously served as a Clinical Fellow in the Johns Hopkins Department of Pathology and Research Fellow in the Molecular Genetics Laboratory of the Johns Hopkins Oncology Center.

== Career ==
Following her residency, Cho became an Instructor in the Department of Pathology at Johns Hopkins University before being appointed to the rank of assistant professor in the Departments of Pathology, Oncology, and Gynecology and Obstetrics in 1991. She remained with Johns Hopkins until 1998 when she accepted an associate professor position at the University of Michigan. As a result of her research in molecular biology, she was elected a Fellow of the American Society for Clinical Investigation in 2000. Following her promotion to Full professor with tenure in 2002, Cho's laboratory developed a mouse model to research ovarian endometrioid adenocarcinoma.

From 2013 to 2014, Cho served as Interim Chair of the University of Michigan's Department of Pathology. Following this, she was elected a member of the National Academy of Medicine for both her diagnostic expertise and laboratory research in gynecological cancer. In 2017, her research team used genetically modified mice to mimic tumors that closely resembled human high-grade serous carcinomas.

In January 2019, Cho received a five-year R01 grant from the National Institutes of Health to continue her work in ovarian cancer research.

== Personal life ==
Cho and her husband, Eric Fearon, have two daughters together. In her free time, she enjoys watching basketball and cooking.
