= Central Somerset, Maine =

- Unorganized territory
- Location within Maine Location within the United States
- Coordinates: 45°00′30″N 70°00′03″W
- Country: United States
- State: Maine
- County: Somerset

Area
  - Total: 77.8 sq mi (201.4 km^{2})
  - Land: 76.6 sq mi (198.5 km^{2})
  - Water: 1.1 sq mi (2.9 km^{2})
- Elevation: 1,667 ft (508 m)

Population (2020)
  - Total: 336
  - Density: 4.38/sq mi (1.69/km^{2})
- Time zone: UTC-5 (Eastern (EST))
  - Summer (DST): UTC-4 (EDT)
- ZIP Codes: 04920 (Bingham); 04961 (New Portland)
- Area code: 207
- FIPS code: 23-11820
- GNIS feature ID: 582402

Central Somerset is an unorganized territory in Somerset County, Maine, United States. The population was 336 at the 2020 census.

== Geography ==
According to the United States Census Bureau, the unorganized territory has a total area of 201.4 km^{2} (77.8 sq mi), of which 198.5 km^{2} (76.6 sq mi) is land and 2.9 km^{2} (1.1 sq mi) (1.45%) is water.

The territory consists of the townships of Concord and Lexington.

== Demographics ==
Historical population
Census	Pop.	Note	%±
1970	216		—
1980	278		28.7%
1990	289		4.0%
2000	336		16.3%
2010	338		0.6%
2020	336		−0.6%
U.S. Decennial Census

As of the census of 2000, there were 336 people, 154 households, and 91 families residing in the unorganized territory. The population density was 1.7 people/km^{2} (4.4 people/mi^{2}). There were 343 housing units at an average density of 1.7 units/km^{2} (4.4 units/mi^{2}). The racial makeup of the unorganized territory was 99.40% White, 0.30% Black or African American, and 0.30% from two or more races. Hispanic or Latino of any race were 0.60% of the population.

There were 154 households, out of which 22.7% had children under the age of 18 living with them, 44.2% were married couples living together, 5.2% had a female householder with no husband present, and 40.9% were non-families. 32.5% of all households were made up of individuals, and 15.6% had someone living alone who was 65 years of age or older. The average household size was 2.18 and the average family size was 2.73.

In the unorganized territory the population was spread out, with 19.3% under the age of 18, 7.7% from 18 to 24, 19.9% from 25 to 44, 35.1% from 45 to 64, and 17.9% who were 65 years of age or older. The median age was 46 years. For every 100 females, there were 102.4 males. For every 100 females age 18 and over, there were 110.1 males.

The median income for a household in the unorganized territory was $26,250, and the median income for a family was $29,886. Males had a median income of $26,250 versus $20,833 for females. The per capita income for the unorganized territory was $13,605. About 8.6% of families and 14.7% of the population were below the poverty line, including 8.0% of those under age 18 and 14.5% of those age 65 or over.

== Education ==
The Maine Department of Education takes responsibility for coordinating school assignments in the unorganized territory.

== Notable person ==
- Jonathan Carter, environmentalist and two-time candidate for governor.
