= Dirigo Health =

The Dirigo Health Agency (sometimes known simply as Dirigo Health) was a government agency run by the state of Maine in the United States. It oversees the state's subsidized health insurance program, DirigoChoice. The program was launched in 2005, and takes its name from the state motto of Maine, Dirigo, which is a Latin phrase meaning "I Lead." The program ended December 31, 2013 with the implementation of the Affordable Care Act (also known as Obamacare).

== Origins ==
Dirigo Health was created as part of Maine Public Law 469, also known as the Dirigo Health Reform Act. It was originally presented to the Maine Legislature by Governor John Baldacci in May 2003 and became law in June 2003. The law is a comprehensive reform of the state's health care system, addressing cost, quality and access. Along with DirigoChoice, it created the Maine Quality Forum, a state health plan and put forth measures to reduce the growth of health care costs in Maine, including asking hospitals to voluntarily cap their annual cost increases at 3% per year and their operating margins at 3.5% per year. The law further expanded Medicaid program in the state.

== DirigoChoice ==
DirigoChoice is a subsidized health insurance program available to Maine businesses with fewer than 50 employees, the self-employed, and other individuals. The program is funded through a one-time grant of $53 million from the state, employer and employee contributions, Medicaid payments, and an ongoing assessment on insurance entities known as the "Savings Offset Payment" (SOP) based on savings attributable to the operations of Dirigo.

In 2002, it was estimated that over 100,000 Maine residents were uninsured. Almost 80% of enrollees have family incomes below 300% of the Federal Poverty Level. 700 small employers were enrolled in DirigoChoice, representing 2.5% of the firms that are eligible. The primary barrier for very small employers appears to be price. The revenues for the program have been lower than expected, creating political pressure to find other funding sources.

Harvard Pilgrim Health Care became the insurance carrier for DirigoChoice effective January 1, 2008.

Caps on enrollment were put into place in September 2007 which remained in place as of the November 2009 enrollment report.

== Controversy ==
Although proponents of the legislation that set up Dirigo Health projected that it could cover 31,000 previously uninsured Maine residents in its first year, the actual figure through the program's first twelve months was 8,600. After fifteen months, enrollment had grown to 9,800; an additional 4,900 people had enrolled in the Medicaid expansion. Anthem, the initial carrier for DirigoChoice, says that enrollment rates for the program are significantly higher than other new insurance programs.

The Dirigo Health Agency Board of Directors has been accused of inflating the cost savings from the program to drive up the amount the state can recoup through the SOP. However, the final savings determination of $43.7 million was decided by the state's Superintendent of Insurance. His decision came after an independent and thorough review of testimony provided during an adjudicatory hearing from opponents and proponents to Dirigo. Several organizations within the state, including the Maine State Chamber of Commerce and the Maine Association of Health Plans, of which Anthem is a member, have brought legal action against the state to argue that the SOP is improperly calculated and assessed.

== See also ==
- Comprehensive health insurance (Maine)
