= Comprehensive health insurance (Maine) =

Government program in the US

In June 2003, the Maine, US Legislature passed a comprehensive health insurance plan, granting low-cost coverage to all state residents by 2009. The law stated that a semi-private agency would provide coverage to uninsured residents, small businesses, municipalities, and the self-employed. Premiums were set at a sliding scale, where individuals making below $27,000 and families making below $55,000 would be eligible for reduced rates, and the law called for the creation of a watchdog group to monitor hospital and doctor costs. The bill passed the Maine House of Representatives 105 to 38, and the Maine Senate 25 to 8.

== Impacts ==
About 15,000 of the 140,000 uninsured have been covered by the program. The original project goals were to pay for the program with savings from reducing inefficiencies in the existing system and not raise taxes, while providing insurance to 140,000 people. Another goal was to make hospital pricing more transparent to customers. Over time, the state was forced to raise taxes over 5% to help pay for this program, and enrollment in the program was ultimately closed due to cost issues.

== Analysis ==
Scholars have identified Maine's health insurance law as one of several state laws from the early 2000s designed to "make insurance available to most of their residents." Other scholars suggested that state healthcare laws, including the Maine health insurance act, indicated that healthcare reform had become an issue of national significance.

== See also ==
- Dirigo Health
