= Eric Fearon =

American oncologist

- Born: Eric Reese Fearon; Farmington, Maine, US
- Education: Johns Hopkins University (BA); Johns Hopkins School of Medicine (MD, PhD)
- Years active: 1990 -
- Employer: University of Michigan Rogel Cancer Center
- Spouse: Kathleen R. Cho
- Children: 2
- Scientific career
- Fields: Cancer
- Thesis: A genetic model of colorectal tumorigenesis (Johns Hopkins, 1990)

Eric Reese Fearon is an American oncologist. He is the Emanuel N. Maisel Professor of Oncology at the University of Michigan and director of the University of Michigan Rogel Cancer Center.

== Early life and education ==
Fearon was born to Margaret Fearon and Ross Fearon. He was raised with his sister Gretchen in Farmington, Maine. He attended Mt. Blue High School in Farmington.

For college, he enrolled at Johns Hopkins University and received his Bachelor of Arts degree in biophysics in 1983. His undergraduate adviser, neurobiologist R. Kevin "Skip" Hunt, encouraged him to pursue scientific research. He attended Johns Hopkins School of Medicine and earned an MD and Ph.D. in biology as part of the Biology/Program in Human Genetics in 1990. During his graduate studies at Johns Hopkins, Fearon was inducted into the Phi Beta Kappa.

After receiving his medical and doctoral degrees, Fearon conducted his postdoctoral research in the laboratory of Chi Van Dang, where he developed a system to study protein-protein interactions in living mammalian cells. Fearon also enrolled at the MD Anderson Cancer Center, where he was awarded the Wilson S. Stone Memorial Award.

== Career ==
Fearon joined the University of Michigan (U-M) in 1995 as the associate director for Basic Science Research at the University of Michigan Rogel Cancer Center. In 1999, Fearon was elected a Fellow of the American Society for Clinical Investigation (ASCI). He later served as president of the ASCI from 2005 to 2006. He was named deputy director of the Rogel Cancer Center in 2005 and was the director in 2016.

During his tenure at U-M, Fearon's laboratory conducts research to understand how defects in cancer genes contribute to the development and progression of colorectal and other cancers. By 2013, he also served as the division chief of Molecular Medicine & Genetics in the Department of Internal Medicine and co-directed the U-M Cancer Center's Cancer Genetics Research Program. Fearon also chaired the National Institutes of Health and National Cancer Institute advisory groups and grant review committees. As a result of his research, Fearon was elected a member of the National Academy of Medicine. A few years later, Fearon was awarded the Distinguished Faculty Lectureship Award in Biomedical Research for being "a giant in the field of carcinogenesis, specifically colorectal cancer."

In 2018, Fearon was named a fellow of the American Association for the Advancement of Science for "distinguished contributions to the cancer field, particularly in defining the role of accumulated mutations in oncogenes and tumor suppressor genes in colon cancer pathogenesis."

== Personal life ==
Fearon and his wife, Kathleen R. Cho, have two daughters together.

He is an avid cyclist and pedals approximately 120 miles per week.
