= Anne S. Andrew =

American attorney & diplomat (born 1955)

Anne Slaughter Andrew
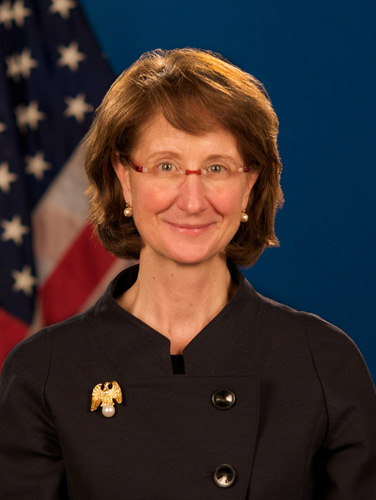

United States Ambassador to Costa Rica
- In office January 12, 2010 – June 13, 2013
- President: Barack Obama
- Preceded by: Peter Cianchette
- Succeeded by: S. Fitzgerald Haney

Personal details
- Born: 1955 (age 70–71) Evansville, Indiana, U.S.
- Party: Democratic
- Spouse: Joe Andrew
- Children: 2
- Education: Georgetown University (BA); Indiana University School of Law (JD)
- Profession: Environmental attorney

Anne Slaughter Andrew (born 1955) is an American environmental attorney and was the United States Ambassador to Costa Rica from 2010 to 2013 after being appointed by President Barack Obama.

== Early life and education ==
Born in Evansville, Indiana, Andrew graduated from Georgetown University with a Bachelor of Arts. She received her Juris Doctor in 1983 from Indiana University School of Law at Indianapolis, where she served as Editor-in-Chief of the Indiana Law Review.

Andrew is married to former Chair of the Democratic National Committee Joe Andrew and they have two children.

== Career ==
Andrew served as Co-Chair of the Environment/Energy Team at the law firm of Baker & Daniels from 1986 to 2000, and later became a partner at the Washington, D.C. law firm of Patton Boggs, where she practiced from 2001 to 2003. In 2004, she co-founded a medical bio-tech consulting company, Anson Group LLC, of which she was a co-owner and director from 2004 to 2007. In 2007, Andrew was a founder of New Energy Nexus, LLC a consulting firm advising companies and investors on strategies related to clean energy technology.

From 1997 to 1999, Andrew was adjunct professor of law at Indiana University School of Law in Indianapolis.

Andrew was actively engaged in conservation and environmental protection throughout her career working with organizations like The Clean Economy Network, the Sierra Club, and The Nature Conservancy.

=== Ambassador to Costa Rica ===
Andrew was confirmed unanimously to be Ambassador to Costa Rica by the United States Senate on December 24, 2009, and is the first woman to serve as U.S. Ambassador to Costa Rica.

She presented her credentials on January 12, 2010, and served until June 13, 2013.

== Honors and awards ==
In 2015, she was awarded the McKinney School of Law Distinguished Alumni Award and in 2020, she was awarded the Bicentennial Medal from Indiana University.

Diplomatic posts
Preceded by Peter Cianchette	U.S. Ambassador to Costa Rica; 2010–2013	Succeeded by S. Fitzgerald Haney
