= Lexington, Maine =

Township in Somerset County, Maine, U.S.

Coordinates: 44°59′55″N 70°03′13″W

Lexington, Maine is a township in Somerset County, Maine, United States. Lexington, along with the township of Concord, is located in the unorganized territory, Central Somerset. The population of Central Somerset was 336 as of the 2000 census.

Originally called Gilman Pond Plantation, an attempted settlement was made in 1804 by Isaac Elder, but an early frost killed his garden and he moved to New Portland. In 1806 Elder's father-in-law, David Quint took over the farm, becoming the first permanent settler. Governor King, the proprietor of the town had three agents, David Quint, then Henry Morgan and finally Abraham Smith, who oversaw the sale of lands and operated his farm and mill in the township. King chose to name the new town Frazier, in honor of his wife, Anne Frazier of Boston, since Kingfield had been named for him. However, the settlers sent in another petition, changing the name to Lexington, in conjunction with Concord, Maine, which had been incorporated in 1826. The town of Lexington was incorporated in March 1833.

Lexington is home to Jonathan Carter, an environmentalist who ran twice unsuccessfully for Governor of Maine as the Maine Green Independent Party nominee.

== Education ==
The Maine Department of Education takes responsibility for coordinating school assignments in the unorganized territories. Residents are assigned to Maine School Administrative District 58: Kingfield Elementary School, Phillips Elementary School, Strong Elementary School, and Mt. Abram High School.
