= Peter Kyros =

American politician

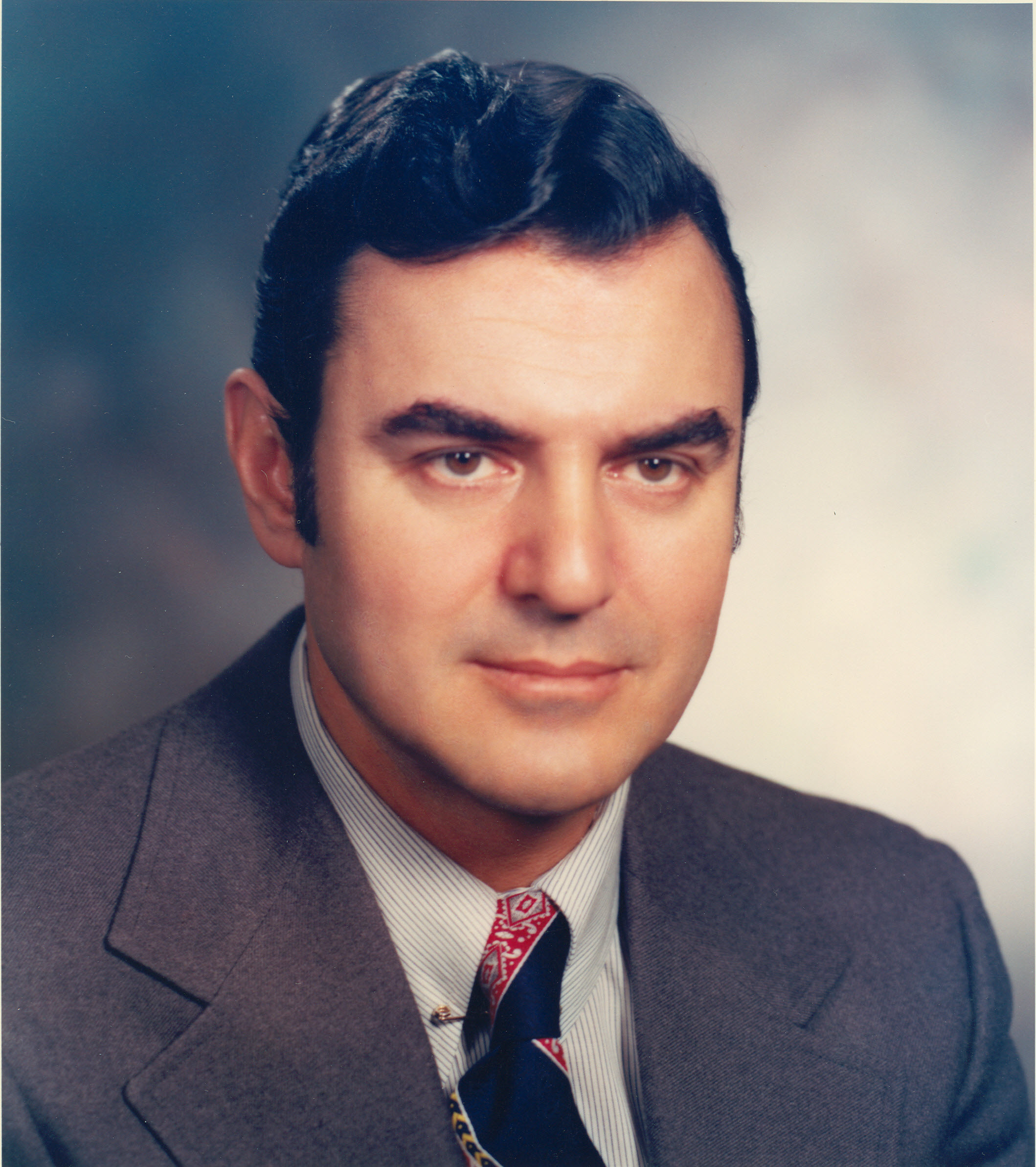

Member of the U.S. House of Representatives from Maine's 1st district
- In office January 3, 1967 – January 3, 1975
- Preceded by: Stanley R. Tupper
- Succeeded by: David F. Emery

Personal details
- Born: Peter Nicholas Kyros; July 11, 1925 Portland, Maine, U.S.
- Died: July 10, 2012 (aged 86) Washington, D.C., U.S.
- Party: Democratic
- Education: United States Naval Academy (BS); Harvard University (LLB)

Military service
- Branch/service: United States Navy
- Years of service: 1944–1953

Peter Nicholas Kyros (July 11, 1925 – July 10, 2012) was an American attorney, politician, and lobbyist who served as a Democratic U.S. representative from Maine from 1967 to 1975.

== Early life and education ==
Born in Portland, Maine, to Greek immigrants, Kyros attended the Portland Public Schools completed an engineering program at the Massachusetts Institute of Technology. He earned a bachelor's degree from the United States Naval Academy in 1947 and a law degree from Harvard Law School in 1957.

== Career ==
Kyros served in the United States Navy from 1944 to 1953 and was discharged with rank of lieutenant. He was admitted to the bar in 1957 and commenced the practice of law in Portland, Maine. From 1957 to 1959, Kyros served as counsel to the Maine Public Utilities Commission.

=== Congress ===
Kyros was elected as a Democrat to the Ninetieth and to the three succeeding Congresses (January 3, 1967 – January 3, 1975). He was an unsuccessful candidate for reelection in 1974 to the Ninety-fourth Congress, narrowly losing to Republican nominee David Emery, and tried unsuccessfully to regain the seat in 1976.

=== Later career ===
He served in the United States Department of State from 1980 to 1982.

Kyros resumed the practice of law in Washington, D.C., lobbying "for several firms active on Capitol Hill, advocating for scientific and medical research".

== Personal life ==
Kyros died on July 10, 2012.
