= 1982 United States Senate election in Maine =

- November 2, 1982
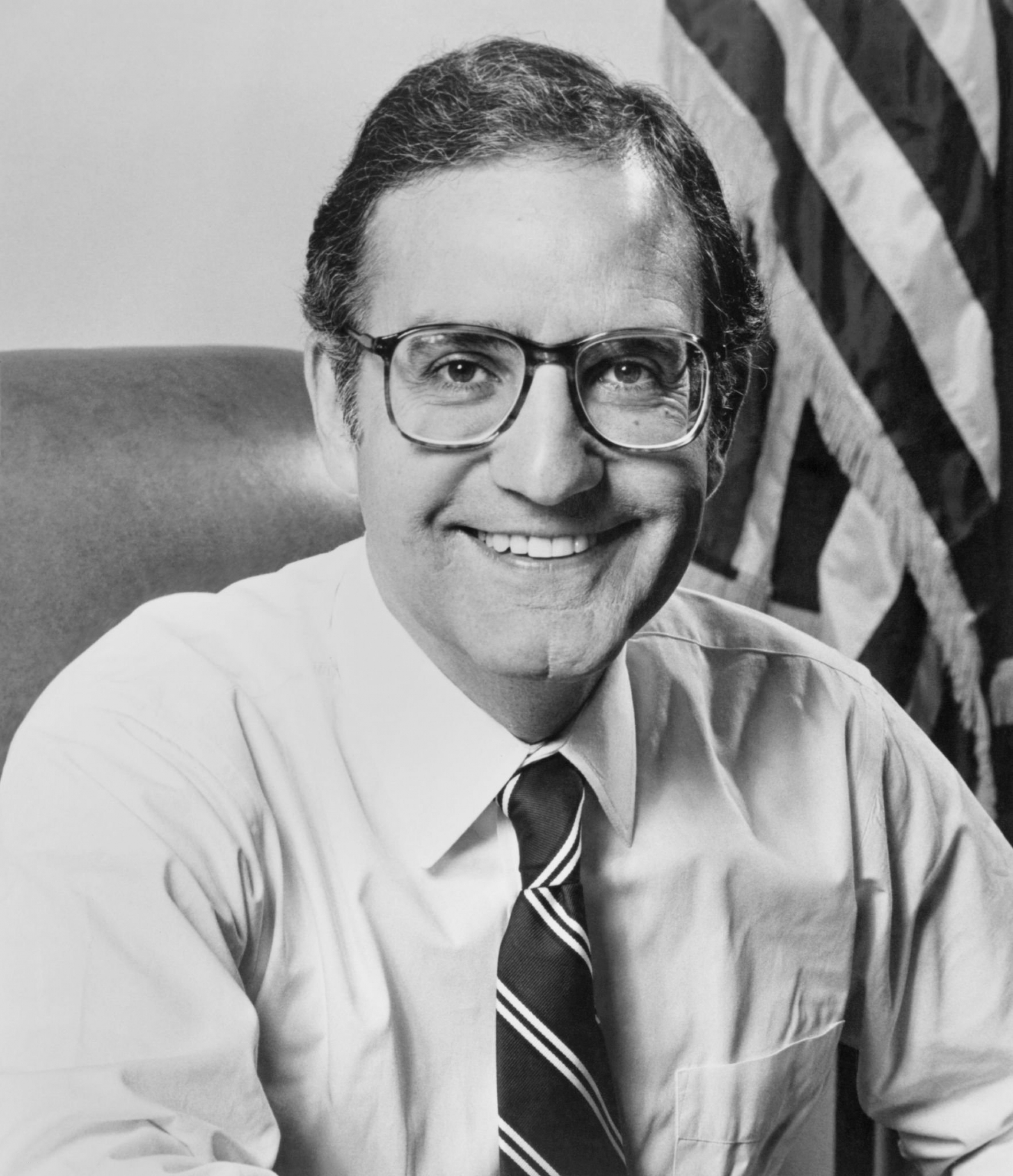

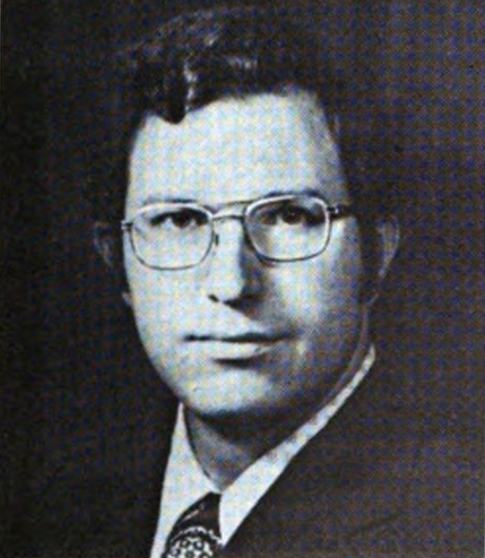
Nominee	George J. Mitchell	David F. Emery
Party	Democratic	Republican
Popular vote	279,819	179,882
Percentage	60.87%	39.13%
- Mitchell: 50–60% 60–70% 70–80% 80–90% >90% Emery: 50–60% 60–70% 70–80% Tie: 50%
U.S. senator before election
George J. Mitchell
Democratic
Elected U.S. Senator
George J. Mitchell
Democratic

The 1982 United States Senate election in Maine took place on November 2, 1982. Edmund Muskie, elected in the 1976 Senate election, resigned his seat in 1980 to become Secretary of State. Incumbent Senator George J. Mitchell, who was appointed to the seat on May 17, 1980, by Governor Joseph E. Brennan, won election to a full six-year term, defeating Congressman David F. Emery by 99,937 votes. Mitchell carried 15 of Maine's 16 counties, with Emery only winning Knox County.

== Democratic primary ==
=== Candidates ===
- George J. Mitchell, incumbent U.S. Senator

=== Results ===
Democratic primary results
Party	Candidate	Votes	%
Democratic	George J. Mitchell (incumbent)	68,169	100.00%
Total votes		68,169	100.00%

== Republican primary ==
=== Candidates ===
- David F. Emery, U.S. Representative from the 1st congressional district

=== Results ===
Republican primary results
Party	Candidate	Votes	%
Republican	David F. Emery	75,167	100.00%
Total votes		75,167	100.00%

== General election ==
=== Candidates ===
- George J. Mitchell (D), incumbent U.S. Senator
- David F. Emery (R), U.S. Representative from the 1st congressional district

=== Results ===
General election results
Party	Candidate	Votes	%
Democratic	George J. Mitchell (Incumbent)	279,819	60.87
Republican	David F. Emery	179,882	39.13
None	Write-Ins	14	0.00
Majority		99,937	21.74
Turnout		459,715	
Democratic hold			

== See also ==
- 1982 United States Senate elections
