= Concord, Maine =

Township in Maine, United States

Coordinates: 45°1′N 69°56′W

Concord, Maine is a township in Somerset County, Maine, United States. Concord, along with the township of Lexington, is located in the unorganized territory, Central Somerset. The population of Central Somerset was 336 as of the 2000 census.

Concord was the only municipality in the United States to cast a majority of its votes for Ron Paul in the 2012 presidential election. Paul did not appear on the ballot, but took enough write-in votes in Concord to finish ahead of all listed candidates, including Barack Obama and Mitt Romney.

== Education ==
The Maine Department of Education takes responsibility for coordinating school assignments in the unorganized territory. As of 2025 the state assigns Concord to Maine School Administrative District 13 schools: Moscow Elementary School, Quimby Middle School, and Upper Kennebec Valley Senior High School.
