= Peter Cianchette =

American politician

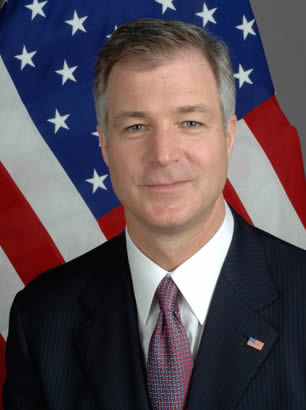

United States Ambassador to Costa Rica
- In office June 12, 2008 – June 22, 2009
- President: George W. Bush; Barack Obama
- Preceded by: Peter Brennan (acting)
- Succeeded by: Anne Andrew

Member of the Maine House of Representatives from the 24th district
- In office December 4, 1996 – December 6, 2000
- Preceded by: Santo DiPietro
- Succeeded by: Larry Bliss

Personal details
- Born: Peter Ernest Cianchette; June 21, 1961 (age 65) Waterville, Maine, U.S.
- Party: Republican
- Education: Roger Williams University; University of Maine, Orono (BA)

Peter Ernest Cianchette (born June 25, 1961) is an American diplomat, businessman, politician and former United States Ambassador to Costa Rica from 2008 to 2009. He was elected to the Maine House of Representatives and served there from 1996 to 2000. Cianchette was the Republican nominee for governor of Maine in 2002, losing to the Democratic candidate, U.S. Representative John Baldacci.

== Early life and education ==
Cianchette was raised in Pittsfield, Maine. He attended Maine Central Institute and worked as a youth for the Cianbro construction and construction services company which his father, Ival "Bud" Cianchette, and his uncles, Ken, Carl and Chuck, founded in 1949. Cianchette was graduated from the University of Maine with a business administration degree.

== Career ==
Cianchette worked in Cianbro's Dragon Products cement division until 1985. In 1985, he moved to the South Portland area and worked in business there with The Cianchette Group, a public affairs management and business consulting firm; the Portland-based private investment firm, CHK Capital Partners; and, starting in 1998, the business and public affairs consulting firm, Pierce Atwood Consulting, where he served as chief operating officer and executive vice-president.

=== Public sector ===
Cianchette served two terms as a state Representative (1996–2000) from South Portland and Cape Elizabeth and was the Republican candidate in Maine's 2002 gubernatorial election, making a credible showing. He served on the National Republican Committee and as the Maine General Chairman of the Bush-Cheney 2004 re-election campaign.

Cianchette was appointed Ambassador to Costa Rica by President Bush and sworn in on May 8, 2008. He presented his credentials on June 12, 2008 and served until June 19, 2009. He was the 56th person to hold the position and was succeeded by Anne S. Andrew.

=== Return to private sector ===
After service in Costa Rica, Cianchette rejoined Cianbro as vice president of business development.

== Personal and civic life ==
A community and civic activist, Cianchette served as a director on the boards of the Make-A-Wish Foundation of Maine and also served on the Republican National Committee and as director of the Greater Portland Big Brothers/Big Sisters, the Boy Scouts of America/Pine Tree Council, the Portland Chamber of Commerce, the Southern Maine Community College Foundation, YES! to Youth. Cianchette is an alumni initiate brother of Pi Kappa Phi fraternity.

He lives in Maine with his wife Carolyn and their two children, Evan and Maria.

His uncles, Carl and Chuck, were both Democratic members of the Maine Senate. Carl was also the final chairman of the Executive Council of Maine before its abolition.

Party political offices
Preceded by Jim Longley	Republican nominee for Governor of Maine; 2002	Succeeded by Chandler Woodcock
Diplomatic posts
Preceded by Peter Brennan; Acting	United States Ambassador to Costa Rica; 2008–2009	Succeeded by Anne Andrew
