= 2002 Maine gubernatorial election =

- November 5, 2002
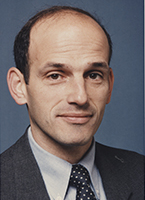

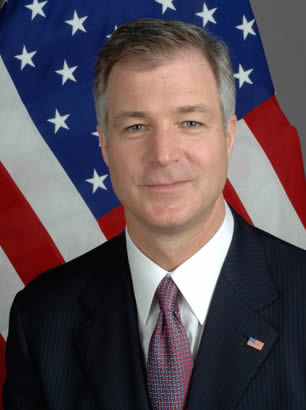

Nominee	John Baldacci	Peter Cianchette	Jonathan Carter
Party	Democratic	Republican	Green
Popular vote	238,179	209,496	46,903
Percentage	47.15%	41.47%	9.28%
- Baldacci: 30–40% 40–50% 50–60% 60–70% 70–80% 80–90% >90% Cianchette: 40–50% 50–60% 60–70% 70–80% 80–90% Carter: 50–60% Tie: 40–50% 50%
Governor before election
Angus King
Independent
Elected Governor
John Baldacci
Democratic

The 2002 Maine gubernatorial election took place on November 5, 2002, to elect the governor of Maine. Incumbent Independent governor Angus King was term-limited and could not seek re-election to a third consecutive term. U.S. Congressman John Baldacci won the Democratic primary uncontested, while former State Representative Peter Cianchette emerged from the Republican primary victorious. Baldacci and Cianchette squared off in the general election, along with Green Party nominee Jonathan Carter and independent State Representative John Michael.

Ultimately, John Baldacci prevailed to win what would be his first of two terms as governor. This was the first election since 1982 that Maine elected a Democratic governor. This is the last time Cumberland and Knox counties voted Republican in a gubernatorial election, and also the last time that Piscataquis, Somerset, and Washington counties voted Democratic in a gubernatorial election; Franklin County would not vote Democratic again until 2018.

== Democratic primary ==
=== Candidates ===
- John Baldacci, U.S. Representative from Maine's 2nd congressional district

=== Results ===
Democratic primary results
Party	Candidate	Votes	%
Democratic	John Baldacci	71,735	100.00
Total votes		71,735	100.00

== Republican primary ==
=== Candidates ===
- Peter Cianchette, former State Representative
- James Libby, former State Senator

=== Results ===
Republican primary results
Party	Candidate	Votes	%
Republican	Peter E. Cianchette	52,692	66.88
Republican	James D. Libby	26,091	33.12
Total votes		78,783	100.00

== Green Party primary ==
=== Candidates ===
- Jonathan Carter, nominee for governor in 1994

=== Withdrawn ===
- Steven Farsaci, minister (dropped out of the race after failing to collect the mandatory 2,000 Green Independent signatures)

=== Results ===
Green Party primary results
Party	Candidate	Votes	%
Green	Jonathan Carter	1,613	100.00
Total votes		1,613	100.00

== General election ==
=== Candidates ===
- John Baldacci (D), U.S. Representative
- Peter Cianchette (R), former state representative
- Jonathan Carter (G), nominee for governor in 1994
- John Michael (I), state representative

=== Predictions ===
Source	Ranking	As of
The Cook Political Report	Lean D (flip)	October 31, 2002
Sabato's Crystal Ball	Likely D (flip)	November 4, 2002

=== Results ===
County Flips: Democratic Flip / Republican Flip

Maine gubernatorial election, 2002
Party	Candidate	Votes	%	±%
Democratic	John Baldacci	238,179	47.15%	+35.37%
Republican	Peter Cianchette	209,496	41.47%	+22.89%
Green	Jonathan Carter	46,903	9.28%	+2.59%
Independent	John Michael	10,612	2.10%	
Majority		28,683	5.68%	−33.26%
Turnout		505,190		
Democratic gain from Independent		Swing		

==== Results by county ====
County	John Baldacci Democratic		Peter Cianchette Republican		Jonathan Carter Green		John Michael Independent		Margin		Total votes cast
County	#	%	#	%	#	%	#	%	#	%	#
Androscoggin	17,064	46.5%	15,069	41.0%	3,110	8.5%	1,492	4.1%	1,995	5.5%	36,735
Aroostook	15,785	60.5%	8,401	32.2%	1,279	4.9%	624	2.4%	7,384	28.3%	26,089
Cumberland	49,900	43.7%	50,095	43.8%	12,083	11.2%	1,470	1.3%	-195	-0.1%	114,268
Franklin	5,147	45.4%	4,711	41.6%	1,127	9.9%	350	3.1%	436	3.8%	11,335
Hancock	12,132	52.0%	8,600	36.9%	2,238	9.6%	366	1.6%	3,532	15.1%	23,336
Kennebec	22,159	47.8%	19,047	41.1%	4,193	9.0%	978	2.1%	3,112	6.7%	46,377
Knox	6,636	40.5%	7,266	44.3%	2,184	13.3%	304	1.9%	-630	-3.8%	16,390
Lincoln	6,325	38.7%	7,512	46.0%	2,029	12.4%	467	2.9%	-1,187	-9.3%	16,333
Oxford	9,275	45.0%	8,815	42.8%	1,844	8.9%	681	3.3%	460	2.2%	20,615
Penobscot	31,619	56.7%	20,861	37.4%	2,468	4.4%	810	1.5%	10,758	19.3%	55,578
Piscataquis	3,583	50.4%	3,045	42.9%	362	5.1%	116	1.6%	538	7.5%	7,106
Sagadahoc	6,186	42.6%	6,253	43.1%	1,762	12.1%	309	2.1%	-67	-0.5%	14,510
Somerset	8,475	46.9%	7,932	43.9%	1,311	7.3%	355	2.0%	543	3.0%	18,073
Waldo	7,002	47.5%	5,944	40.3%	1,575	10.7%	233	1.6%	1,058	7.2%	14,754
Washington	7,013	60.0%	3,902	33.4%	556	4.8%	219	1.9%	3,111	26.6%	11,690
York	29,878	41.6%	32,043	44.6%	8,062	11.2%	1,838	2.6%	-2,165	-3.0%	71,821
Totals	238,179	47.1%	209,496	41.5%	46,903	9.3%	10,612	2.1%	28,683	5.6%	505,190

Counties that flipped from Independent to Democratic

- Androscoggin (largest city: Lewiston)
- Aroostook (largest city: Presque Isle)
- Franklin (largest town: Farmington)
- Hancock (largest municipality: Ellsworth)
- Kennebec (largest city: Augusta)
- Oxford (largest town: Rumford)
- Penobscot (largest city: Bangor)
- Piscataquis (largest municipality: Dover-Foxcroft)
- Somerset (largest town: Skowhegan)
- Washington (largest city: Calais)
- Waldo (largest city: Belfast)

Counties that flipped from Independent to Republican

- Cumberland (largest city: Portland)
- Knox (largest municipality: Rockland)
- Lincoln (largest city: Waldoboro)
- Sagadahoc (largest town: Bath)
- York (largest town: Biddeford)

== Analysis ==
Baldacci carried much of western and northern Maine, which he had represented in Congress, while Cianchette used his southern Maine roots to win traditionally Democratic Cumberland County and its surroundings. This election is the most recent time Cumberland County voted for a Republican in a gubernatorial election, as well as the most recent time Piscataquis County voted for a Democrat in any gubernatorial, senate, or presidential election.

Of the five counties Cianchette carried, four voted for Democrat Al Gore in the presidential election held two years earlier, while Baldacci carried four counties that voted for Republican George W. Bush in that election. Baldacci would also win both counties (Piscataquis and Washington) that Bush would carry two years later in the 2004 presidential election, while all of the counties Cianchette won would vote for Democrat John Kerry.

Baldacci and Cianchette finished with exact ties in a handful of municipalities: Chesterville, Kingsbury Plantation, Lincoln Plantation, Mercer, Waite, and West Forks, as well as a handful of precincts for voters in unincorporated portions of Washington County. Carter would carry one municipality, Perkins Township in Franklin County.
