= Seboeis Plantation, Maine =

- Plantation
- Location within Maine Location within the United States
- Coordinates: 45°23′02″N 68°44′50″W
- Country: United States
- State: Maine
- County: Penobscot

Area
  - Total: 41.8 sq mi (108.2 km^{2})
  - Land: 40.0 sq mi (103.6 km^{2})
  - Water: 1.8 sq mi (4.6 km^{2})
- Elevation: 190 ft (58 m)

Population (2020)
  - Total: 40
  - Density: 1.0/sq mi (0.39/km^{2})
- Time zone: UTC-5 (Eastern (EST))
  - Summer (DST): UTC-4 (EDT)
- ZIP code: 04448
- Area code: 207
- FIPS code: 23-67160
- GNIS feature ID: 582719

Seboeis Plantation is a plantation in Penobscot County, Maine, United States. The population was 40 according to the 2020 census.

== Etymology ==
Seboeis is a name derived from the Penobscot language meaning "brook or small stream".

== Geography ==
According to the United States Census Bureau, the plantation has a total area of 41.8 square miles (108.2 km^{2}), of which 40.0 square miles (103.6 km^{2}) is land and 1.8 square miles (4.6 km^{2}), or 4.26%, is water.

== Demographics ==
Historical population
Census	Pop.	Note	%±
1890	98		—
1900	96		−2.0%
1910	86		−10.4%
1920	83		−3.5%
1930	41		−50.6%
1940	80		95.1%
1950	70		−12.5%
1960	77		10.0%
1970	63		−18.2%
1980	53		−15.9%
1990	40		−24.5%
2000	41		2.5%
2010	35		−14.6%
2020	40		14.3%
U.S. Decennial Census

At the 2000 census, there were 41 people, 17 households and 13 families living in the plantation. The population density was 1.0 per square mile (0.39/km^{2})). There were 58 housing units at an average density of 1.4 per square mile (0.54/km^{2}). The racial make-up of the plantation was 100.00% White. Of the 17 households, 11.8% had children under the age of 18 living with them, 52.9% were married couples living together, 23.5% had a female householder with no husband present and 23.5% were non-families. 23.5% of households were one person and 11.8% were one person aged 65 or older. The average household size was 2.41 and the average family size was 2.77.

The age distribution was 22.0% under the age of 18, 2.4% from 18 to 24, 19.5% from 25 to 44, 31.7% from 45 to 64 and 24.4% 65 or older. The median age was 47 years. For every 100 females, there were 86.4 males. For every 100 females age 18 and over, there were 77.8 males.

The median household income was $38,750 and the median family income was $46,250. Males had a median income of $45,625 and females $0. The per capita income was $14,703. There are 8.3% of families living below the poverty line and 20.0% of the population, including 66.7% of under eighteens and none of those over 64.
