= Barbara Merrill =

American politician

Member of the Maine House of Representatives from the 44th district
- In office December 2004 – December 2006
- Preceded by: Richard G. Woodbury
- Succeeded by: Robert Walker

Personal details
- Born: Barbara E. Butler; 1957 (age 68–69) Frankfurt, Germany
- Party: Independent (2006–present)
- Other political affiliations: Democratic (Before 2006)
- Spouse: Phil Merrill
- Children: 2
- Education: University of Maine, Orono; University of Maine, Portland

Barbara E. Merrill (born 1957 in Frankfurt, Germany) is an American political candidate from Maine. Elected as a Democrat to the state legislature, she left the party in 2006 to become an independent candidate for Governor of Maine.

Merrill lost to Democratic incumbent John Baldacci who was elected to a second term. She finished in third-place receiving 118,715 votes, or about 21% of all votes cast.

Merrill furthered her legal career by working for the Maine law firm Verrill Dana before opening her own legal practice with husband, Phil Merrill.

== Early and childhood years ==
Merrill was born as Barbara Butler in a U.S. Army hospital in Frankfurt, Germany in 1957. Her father, Charles Butler, was a West Point graduate who served in the Korean War, rose to the rank of Lt. Colonel, and was killed in Vietnam when Merrill was a freshman in high school.

Growing up, she lived in Mississippi, Florida, North Carolina, Virginia and Brazil. Her family moved to Maine in time for her to attend Waterville High School and the University of Maine law school, where she earned a Juris Doctor degree. After working for the law firm of Verrill Dana, she opened her own practice with her husband, Phil Merrill. With Philip, she has two children. In her practice, she became a lobbyist, working mainly for non-profit organizations, before the state legislature.

== Political career ==
=== State representative ===
In 2004, she ran as a Democrat for the Maine House of Representatives in Appleton. She won the general election with over 60% of the vote. After a year and a half as a Democratic member of the legislature, she authored the book Setting the Maine Course: We Can Get There from Here, in which she advocated a variety of new policies, including eliminating both the corporate income tax and economic development tax breaks, dedicating the sales tax to funding public education, having the state pay for teacher pay, increasing environmental regulation, decreasing all other regulation, establishing a "rainy day fund" to cover budget deficits, and fighting urban sprawl. She says that she wants Maine to be known as "the Free Enterprise State."

=== Campaign for governor ===
On January 3, 2006, Merrill announced that she was changing her voter registration to "unenrolled," the Maine equivalent of Independent, and leaving the Democratic caucus. This temporarily threw the House into turmoil, as the two major parties became tied in number of members, until Rep. Joanne Twomey, who had left the Democrats the previous November, returned to them, ensuring they would retain a majority. A few days later, in a speech delivered in front of the Charles Butler Army Reserve Center in Saco, Maine, Merrill announced that she would be an independent candidate for Governor.

On May 31, she submitted more than 4,000 valid signatures to the Maine Secretary of State, ensuring that she will receive a place on the ballot. The next day, she submitted proof that she had received 2800 $5 contributions to the Maine Clean Elections Fund, thus qualifying her campaign for partial public funding.

During the general election campaign period large expenditures were made by the Republican and Democratic Governors Association: $714,500 by the Republicans to support State Senator Woodcock, the Republican nominee, and $550,000 by the Democrats to support Democrat Baldacci in his reelection bid. Green candidate LaMarche challenged these expenditures as not truly “independent” in a case before the Maine Supreme Court heard on October 31, 2006. The court did not grant LaMarche’s claim. In a related claim, Barbara Merrill challenged the "independence" of consultant services benefiting the Baldacci campaign before the Maine Commission on Governmental Ethics in a hearing held on October 31, 2006. The Commission did not support Merrill’s claim.

With total campaign expenditures of $915,000, Barbara Merrill received 21.5% of the general election vote. Baldacci was reelected with 38.11% of the vote after spending $1,313,000 in addition to the independent expenditures discussed above. Republican Woodcock received 30.21% of the vote after expending $1,325,000 in addition to independent expenditures. Green candidate LaMarche received 9.5% of the vote after expending $1,127,000.

After the election a routine audit of the Merrill campaign raised a question as to whether the Merrill campaign had a conflict of interest and violated the law in hiring the candidate’s husband, Philip Merrill, to produce media and the media buy for the campaign. The issue was addressed at a meeting of the Commission on Governmental Ethics and Election Practices held on July 16, 2007. The Chair, Michael Friedman, Esq, the only non-party member of the Commission, spoke for the majority when he found that “the conflict of interest issue did not have merit.” He said “everyone also seems to agree that the Merrill campaign did not violate any law or rule.” Friedman found the Philip Merrill was a qualified professional and was paid a reasonable sum for his services. Friedman concluded “there was nothing before the Commission in this case that was illegal or unethical.”

In the next legislative session, the Maine legislature considered legislation to prohibit hiring members of the candidate’s household to work in Maine campaigns. The Ethics Panel did not support the legislation. The legislature did not pass the ban. Instead the Maine legislature enacted a law requiring that any family member hired by a campaign must be a professional at what they were hired to do and that they could only be paid a reasonable sum for their services. 2007 Chapter Law Chapter 567 Passed in April 2008 amending MRSA Title 21-A Section 1125 sub-sec6-B. The Commission had expressly found the Merrill campaign’s hiring of Philip Merrill met both of these conditions in July 2007

== Professional career ==
Barbara Merrill is a veteran advocate for disability-related issues. In 2002, Merrill became the first Executive Director of the Maine Association for Community Service Providers. Then in 2008, Merrill became the Director of Government Relations for the MENTOR Network, a national network of community health and human services providers headquartered in Boston. Beginning in 2012 Merrill was named the Vice President of Public Policy for ANCOR (American Network of Community Options and Resources). ANCOR is a national, nonprofit trade association representing more than 800 private community providers of services to people with disabilities. Merrill is currently the Chief Executive Officer of ANCOR.
