= Mt. Blue High School =

Location
- 129 Seamon Road; Farmington, Maine 04938; United States
- Coordinates: 44°38′18″N 70°07′56″W

Information
- School type: State High School
- Motto: Be here, be safe, be respectful, be responsible
- School district: Mt. Blue Regional School District
- Superintendent: Tina Meserve
- Principal: Monique Poulin
- Teaching staff: 49.80 (FTE)
- Grades: 9–12
- Enrollment: 703 (2023-2024)
- Student to teacher ratio: 14.12
- Hours in school day: 7:45 A.M to 2:02 P.M.
- Colors: Blue and gold
- Athletics: football, soccer, field hockey, golf, cross country, basketball, cheering, wrestling, skiing, track and field, softball, baseball, lacrosse.
- Athletics conference: Northern Maine class A
- Mascot: Cougar
- Team name: Mt. Blue Cougars
- Rival: Skowhegan High School
- Publication: School Newspaper
- Yearbook: Timaron
- Website: www.mtbluersd.org/hs

Mt. Blue High School is a public high school in Farmington, Maine, United States. The school includes grades 9–12 and is a part of the Mt. Blue Regional School District. It and enrolls students from the towns of Farmington, Weld, Temple, Wilton, Chesterville, New Vineyard, Industry, New Sharon, and Vienna. The school's athletic mascot is the cougar.

In 2009 Mt. Blue changed from MSAD to Mt. Blue Regional School District (RSD), to start the new changes to the School. The state of Maine issued the school 63,568,833 dollars for the new school. The school was completely redone, and finished in 2013. The new school cover 226,000s square feet, 35.8% bigger than the old school. The school is three stories tall, and is the largest school in Franklin County.

== Catchment ==
The Maine Department of Education takes responsibility for coordinating school assignments in the unorganized territory. The department gives Mt. Blue High School as an option for the "Washington" community in South Franklin, Maine.

== Notable alumni ==
- David Chamberlain, NCAA All-American X-Country Skier
- Kevin Eastler, four-time U.S. 20-km race walking champion
- Eric Fearon, oncologist
- Lance Harvell, state legislator
- Melanie Sachs, social worker and politician
- Jordan Stevens, American football player and coach
- Seth Wescott, professional snowboarder and first Olympic gold medalist

== Ski team ==
The women's alpine and Nordic skiing team holds the state record for the most consecutive state championships in any sport. They train at Titcomb Mountain in Farmington.
