= Nashville Plantation, Maine =

- Plantation
- Location of Nashville Plantation, Maine
- Coordinates: 46°42′00″N 68°29′04″W
- Country: United States
- State: Maine
- County: Aroostook

Area
  - Total: 35.6 sq mi (92.2 km^{2})
  - Land: 35.2 sq mi (91.2 km^{2})
  - Water: 0.39 sq mi (1.0 km^{2})
- Elevation: 597 ft (182 m)

Population (2020)
  - Total: 27
  - Density: 0.77/sq mi (0.30/km^{2})
- Time zone: UTC-5 (Eastern (EST))
  - Summer (DST): UTC-4 (EDT)
- ZIP Codes: 04732 (Nashville Plantation); 04768 (Portage Lake)
- Area code: 207
- FIPS code: 23-48120
- GNIS feature ID: 582614

Nashville Plantation is a plantation in Aroostook County, Maine, United States. The population was 27 at the 2020 census.

== Geography ==
According to the United States Census Bureau, the plantation has a total area of 35.6 square miles (92.2 km^{2}), of which 35.2 square miles (91.2 km^{2}) is land and 0.39 square miles (1.0 km^{2}), or 1.08%, is water.

== Demographics ==
Historical population
Census	Pop.	Note	%±
1880	33		—
1890	34		3.0%
1900	32		−5.9%
1910	27		−15.6%
1920	39		44.4%
1930	32		−17.9%
1940	36		12.5%
1950	28		−22.2%
1960	30		7.1%
1970	50		66.7%
1980	48		−4.0%
1990	43		−10.4%
2000	55		27.9%
2010	46		−16.4%
2020	27		−41.3%
U.S. Decennial Census

As of the census of 2000, there were 55 people, 22 households, and 15 families living in the plantation. The population density was 1.6 inhabitants per square mile (0.62/km^{2}). There were 25 housing units at an average density of 0.7 per square mile (0.27/km^{2}). The racial makeup of the plantation was 100.00% White.

Of the 22 households 36.4% had children under the age of 18 living with them, 54.5% were married couples living together, 13.6% had a female householder with no husband present, and 31.8% were non-families. 27.3% of households were one person and 9.1% were one person aged 65 or older. The average household size was 2.50 and the average family size was 3.13.

The age distribution was 30.9% under the age of 18, 3.6% from 18 to 24, 29.1% from 25 to 44, 21.8% from 45 to 64, and 14.5% 65 or older. The median age was 34 years. For every 100 females, there were 103.7 males. For every 100 females age 18 and over, there were 81.0 males.

The median household income was $36,875 and the median family income was $41,750. Males had a median income of $51,250 versus $60,833 for females. The per capita income for the plantation was $21,917. There were 13.3% of families and 18.5% of the population living below the poverty line, including 11.8% of under eighteens and 42.9% of those over 64.
