= Pat LaMarche =

American political figure and activist (born 1960)

- Portrait of LaMarche

Co-Chair of the Green Party National Committee
- In office July 24, 2005 – July 24, 2012
- Preceded by: Multiple
- Succeeded by: Multiple

Personal details
- Born: Patricia Helen LaMarche; November 26, 1960 (age 65) Providence, Rhode Island, U.S.
- Party: Green
- Spouse: Chad Bruce (m. 1983)
- Children: 2
- Education: Boston College (BA); University of Amsterdam

Patricia Helen LaMarche (born November 26, 1960) is an American political figure and activist with the Green Party of the United States; she was the party's vice-presidential candidate in the 2004 United States presidential election, with David Cobb as its presidential candidate, and was one of seven co-chairs of the party’s national committee from 2005 to 2012.

LaMarche is also a two-time former candidate for Governor of Maine (1998 and 2006).

== Early life ==
LaMarche was born in Providence, Rhode Island, the fourth of five children. She grew up in a public housing project in that city. Her maternal grandparents were immigrants from southern Ireland. Her father, Paul Henri LaMarche, is a doctor, and her mother, Genevieve (née Judge), was at that time a housewife but later became an auditor employed by the state of Maine. When the family moved to Bangor, Maine, in the 1970s, LaMarche enrolled at John Bapst Memorial High School where she graduated near the top of her class. She pursued her education with four years at Boston College.

LaMarche returned to Maine in 1982, and the following year, she married Michael Russell. She had two children: Rebecca in 1985 and John in 1987. Patricia and Michael divorced in 1990. In the late 1980s, she moved into the broadcasting field and was employed at various television and radio stations in the Bangor area. LaMarche has taught Public Relations at Husson College's school of Communications and headed the Bangor chapter of the Children's Miracle Network.

In 1996 LaMarche moved south to Portland, Maine, to take a job at talk radio station WGAN.

== Career ==
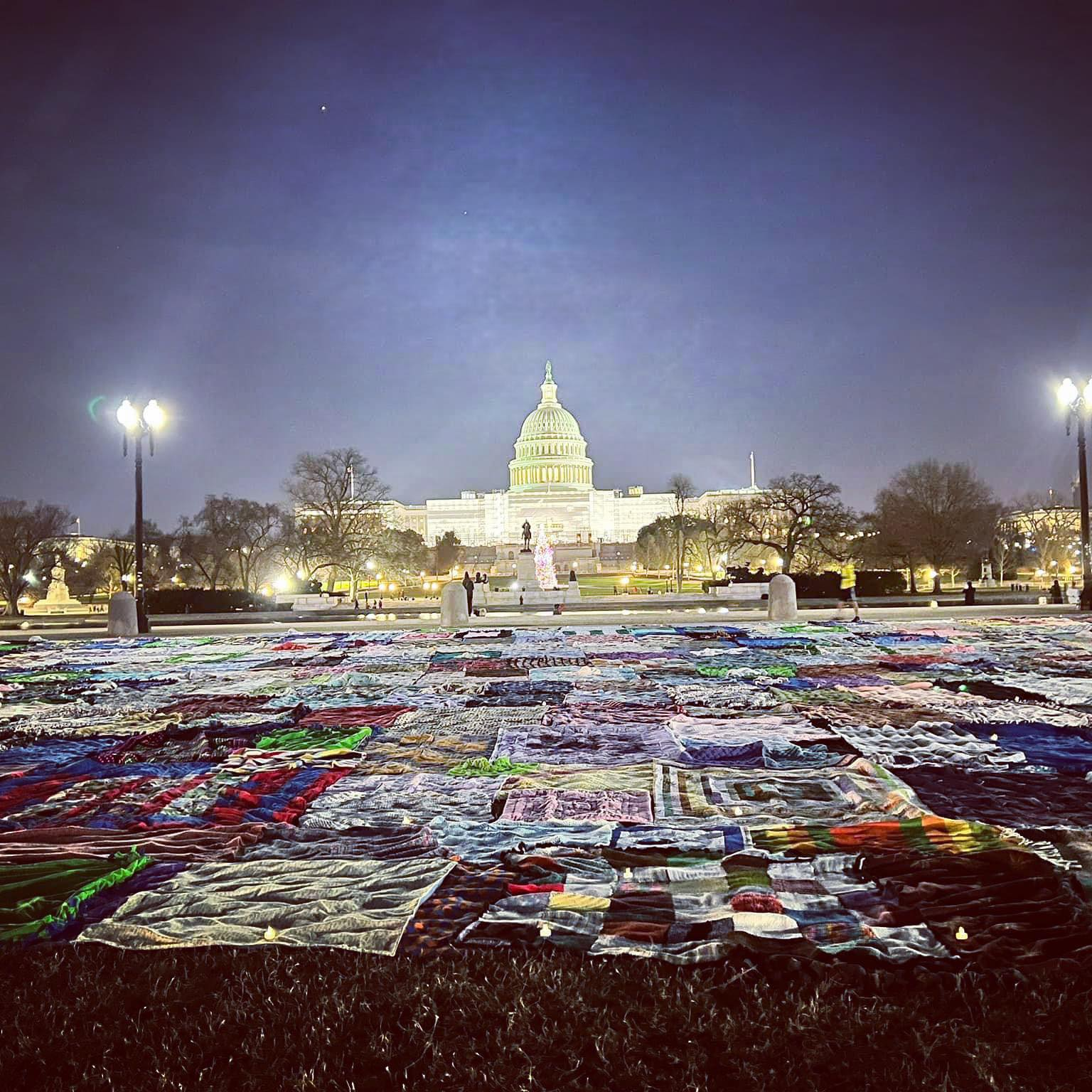
Blankets lay on the west lawn of the U.S. Capitol as part of LaMarche's Homeless Remembrance Blanket Project.

Until the beginning of her vice-presidential campaign, LaMarche was employed by a country music radio station in Maine under the pseudonym of Genny Judge; however, this ended with her candidacy.

On September 5, 2004, LaMarche announced that she would be visiting and staying overnight in homeless and domestic violence shelters throughout the United States "to draw attention to those living on the edge of society." The campaign dubbed this LaMarche's "Left-Out Tour." Left Out in America, LaMarche's book which chronicles her tour through American homeless shelters, was released on October 5, 2006, by Upsala Press.

=== 1998 gubernatorial election ===
In 1998, LaMarche was approached to run for governor by Green Party activists on the Maine Green Independent Party nominee. Despite only raising $20,000, LaMarche's campaign won 7% of the vote. Because her campaign received more than 5% of the total vote, she became the first woman in the history of the state of Maine to gain ballot access for a political party.

=== 2006 gubernatorial election ===
On December 8, 2005, LaMarche announced her candidacy on the Maine Green Independent Party ticket for the 2006 Maine gubernatorial election against incumbent Democrat John Baldacci. Her positions garnered the endorsement, among others, of Chris Miller, progressive former Democratic candidate for governor who lost in the primaries. LaMarche was one of three Maine Candidates who took advantage of Maine's Clean Election Act, a taxpayer-funded campaign system which rewards candidates with public funds if they meet the required 2,500 $5 contributions In November 2006, LaMarche received 51,992 votes (9.56%) in the Maine race for governor.

The LaMarche for Governor website was being permanently archived by the Library of Congress official 2006 Election archive. The site also won a number of awards, including The Golden Dot Award as Best Local Campaign Website of the 2006 campaign at the annual Politics Online conference held in Washington, D.C., on March 15, 2007, A Pollie Award from the American Association of Political Consultants (AAPC) in the gubernatorial websites category, and An Honorable Mention from AAPC for mobile technology used in the LaMarche campaign.

=== Homeless Remembrance Blanket Project ===
In 2021, LaMarche met a woman on permanent disability who expressed her desire to crochet every day. This inspired LaMarche to start the Homeless Remembrance Blanket Project, which collects and distributes homemade blankets. In December, she organized an art installation in Carlisle, Pennsylvania, where nearly 200 blankets were placed on the steps of a church to raise awareness about homelessness; the blankets were later donated to local homeless shelters. In December 2022, LaMarche brought the installation to Washington, D.C., where roughly 1,000 blankets were spread out across the west lawn of the United States Capitol.

== Footnotes ==
Party political offices
Preceded by Winona LaDuke	Green nominee for Vice President of the United States; 2004	Succeeded by Rosa Clemente
