= South Franklin, Maine =

- Unorganized territory
- Location within Maine Location within the United States
- Coordinates: 44°39′20″N 70°21′19″W
- Country: United States
- State: Maine
- County: Franklin

Area
  - Total: 12.4 sq mi (32.2 km^{2})
  - Land: 12.4 sq mi (32.1 km^{2})
  - Water: 0.039 sq mi (0.1 km^{2})
- Elevation: 1,414 ft (431 m)

Population (2020)
  - Total: 60
  - Density: 4.8/sq mi (1.9/km^{2})
- Time zone: UTC-5 (Eastern (EST))
  - Summer (DST): UTC-4 (EDT)
- ZIP Code: 04294 (Wilton)
- Area code: 207
- FIPS code: 23-70760
- GNIS feature ID: 582735

South Franklin is an unorganized territory in Franklin County, Maine, United States. The population was 60 at the 2020 census.

== Geography ==
According to the United States Census Bureau, the unorganized territory has a total area of 12.4 square miles (32.2 km^{2}), of which 12.4 square miles (32.1 km^{2}) is land and 0.04 square mile (0.1 km^{2}) (0.24%) is water.

The territory consists of two townships, Perkins and Washington. Both were former plantations that surrendered their organizations in 1901 and the late 1890s, respectively.

== Demographics ==
Historical population
Census	Pop.	Note	%±
1970	33		—
1980	48		45.5%
1990	56		16.7%
2000	70		25.0%
2010	69		−1.4%
2020	60		−13.0%
U.S. Decennial Census

As of the census of 2000, there were 70 people, 26 households, and 19 families residing in the unorganized territory. The population density was 5.6 inhabitants per square mile (2.2/km^{2}). There were 41 housing units at an average density of 3.3 per square mile (1.3/km^{2}). The racial makeup of the unorganized territory was 100.00% White.

There were 26 households, out of which 38.5% had children under the age of 18 living with them, 61.5% were married couples living together, 11.5% had a female householder with no husband present, and 26.9% were non-families. 15.4% of all households were made up of individuals, and 7.7% had someone living alone who was 65 years of age or older. The average household size was 2.69 and the average family size was 3.11.

In the unorganized territory the population was spread out, with 31.4% under the age of 18, 4.3% from 18 to 24, 25.7% from 25 to 44, 32.9% from 45 to 64, and 5.7% who were 65 years of age or older. The median age was 38 years. For every 100 females, there were 133.3 males. For every 100 females age 18 and over, there were 118.2 males.

The median income for a household in the unorganized territory was $24,167, and the median income for a family was $30,625. Males had a median income of $52,917 versus $21,250 for females. The per capita income for the unorganized territory was $16,453. There were 26.3% of families and 33.8% of the population living below the poverty line, including 52.2% of under eighteens and none of those over 64.

== Education ==
The Maine Department of Education takes responsibility for coordinating school assignments in the unorganized territory, including the "Perkins" community. For the "Washington" community the state gives the following options: Academy Hill School and Mt. Blue High School of Mt. Blue Regional School District (Regional School Unit 9), and Waynflete School.
