= Jonathan Carter (politician) =

American environmentalist and politician

- Born: Connecticut, U.S.
- Education: Williams College (BA); University of New Hampshire (MS)
- Political party: Green
- Spouse: Dorothy
- Children: 2

Jonathan Carter is an American environmentalist, scientist, and political candidate who has run twice for governor of Maine as a Green and once for the U.S. Congress. In 1992, Carter ran for U.S. House of Representatives in Maine's 2nd congressional district. Carter's campaign was designed to educate the public and to establish a green network of social, economic, and ecological activists. He was able to get 27,526 votes for 8.8% of the vote with an expenditure of less than $20,000 and no paid media.

== Early life and education ==
Carter was born in Connecticut and attended Deerfield Academy, a prep school in Deerfield, Massachusetts. He earned a Bachelor of Arts from Williams College and a Master of Science in Botany and Forest Pathology from the University of New Hampshire. He also began work on a doctorate at the University of Maine and Antioch College.

== Career ==
=== Environmental advocacy ===
Carter is best known in Maine for his work on forestry issues. He directed the 1996 ban clear-cutting campaign, "No on the Compact" (1997) and the "Forest for the Future Campaign" (2000). Both referendum campaigns were unsuccessful. He serves as director of the Forest Ecology Network. the largest grassroots forest activist network in Maine.

=== Gubernatorial campaigns ===
In 1994, Carter made his first run for governor of Maine. His campaign received 32,695 votes for 6.4% of the vote, which was enough for the Maine Green Party to be recognized as a political party by the state.

In 2002, Carter again ran for governor. In that campaign, he promoted himself as the first and only candidate to that time to run for governor as a publicly-financed candidate due to the Maine Clean Elections Act. Carter received 46,903 votes for 9.3% of the vote. At the time his campaign, there were only 9,000 registered Green Independent voters in Maine. The Library of Congress recorded and stored a web archive of his campaigns website. His campaign also retained and extended the ballot status of the Maine Green Independent Party through 2006.

== Personal life ==
Carter moved to Maine in 1978 and lives in a nineteenth-century farmhouse in Lexington, Maine, which is located in the unorganized territory of Central Somerset, Maine. He grows organic food on his farm, as well as maintaining a woodlot. He and his wife, Dorothy, have two children.
