= John Michael (politician) =

American state legislator

John M. Michael is a former American state legislator. Michael was born in Lewiston, Maine and represented a portion of Auburn in the Maine House of Representatives from 1978–1986, 1990–1994 and 2000–2002.

In 1994, he ran for US Congress as an Independent and received 8.8% of the vote. In 2002, Michael ran as an independent candidate for governor of Maine. He unsuccessfully sought clean elections funds and received 2.1% of the vote.

Michael ran again for governor in 2006, but withdrew in August because he again failed to qualify for "Clean Election" candidate funds. Included in his platform was an anti-gambling plank.

He also led several citizen initiatives, including two regarding term-limits for elected officials and the 2000 repeal of the "snack tax".

In 2018, Michael was elected to represent part of Auburn on the Androscoggin County Commission.

Maine House of Representatives
| Preceded by Ross A. Green; Barbara M. Trafton | Member of the Maine House of Representatives from 4th district 1979–1984; Served alongside: Joyce E. Lewis, Stephen T. Hughes, Alfred L. Brodeur, Harriet B. Lewis, George L. Boyce, Constance D. Cote | Succeeded by Wesley Farnum |
| Preceded by Karen L. Brown | Member of the Maine House of Representatives from 63rd district 1984–1986 | Succeeded by Susan E. Dore |
| Preceded by Jo Anne D. Lapointe | Member of the Maine House of Representatives from 61st district 1991–1994 | Succeeded by Richard N. Simoneau |
| Preceded by Brian D. Bolduc | Member of the Maine House of Representatives from 74th district 2000–2002 | Succeeded by Sonya G. Sampson |
