= Executive Council of Maine =

Former government body in Maine, US (1820–1977)

Type
- Type: Council of state

History
- Established: March 15, 1820
- Disbanded: January 4, 1977

Structure
- Seats: 7
- Authority: Article V, Part Second, Maine Constitution (repealed)

The Executive Council of Maine was a government body established with the Maine Constitution in 1820 and dissolved in 1977 via a 1975 statewide referendum. It was made up of seven members, traditionally defeated members of the majority legislative party, and was used as a safeguard against gubernatorial control. However, the unelected council often had problems with governors from different political parties. In the last years of the Executive Council, the Republican majority council and legislature faced serious opposition from Democrat Kenneth M. Curtis. In November 1975, the body was disestablished via a statewide referendum. Said former Governor Curtis on the abolishment, "I didn't think I'd live long enough to see it happen".

== Prominent members ==
- John Fremont Hill, Governor of Maine
- Stephen Lindsey, President of the Maine Senate and US Congressman
- Joshua Gage, US Congressman
- John Hodgdon, President of the Maine Senate
- Levi Hubbard, US Congressman
