= Same-sex marriage in Maine =

Same-sex marriage has been legally recognized in Maine since December 29, 2012. A bill for the legalization of same-sex marriages was approved by voters, 53–47 percent, on November 6, 2012, as Maine, Maryland and Washington became the first U.S. states to legalize same-sex marriage by popular vote. Election results were certified by the Maine Secretary of State's office and the Governor of Maine, Paul LePage, on November 29. Maine was the eighth U.S. state to legalize same-sex marriage. (Note: After Massachusetts, Connecticut, Iowa, Vermont, New Hampshire, New York and Washington, but excluding California which had constitutionally banned same-sex marriage in November 2008, but still recognized marriages performed between June and November 2008.)

The 2012 referendum was a reversal of action on a similar bill three years earlier. On May 6, 2009, a bill to allow same-sex marriage in Maine was signed into law by Governor John Baldacci following legislative approval. Opponents of the bill successfully petitioned for a referendum before the law went into effect; voters rejected the law on November 3, 2009, in a "people's veto". Until the referendum result rejected the law, it appeared that Maine would be the first U.S. state to legalize same-sex marriage through the legislative process with a governor's signature, rather than following a judicial ruling. Vermont was the first state to legalize same-sex marriage by statute, but its legislature did so by overriding its governor's veto.

== Domestic partnerships ==
In 2004, Maine established domestic partnerships, which provide same-sex and opposite-sex couples some of the legal rights and benefits of marriage. A domestic partnership grants couples inheritance rights, domestic violence protection and the right to make medical decisions, among others. The legislation was passed by the Maine Legislature and signed into law by Governor John Baldacci on April 28. It took effect on July 30, 2004.

== Same-sex marriage ==
=== 1997 legislation ===
An Act to Protect Traditional Marriage and Prohibit Same Sex Marriages was passed on March 28, 1997. On March 27, the House of Representatives voted 106–39 in favor, followed by the Senate the following day by a 24–10 vote. The bill would have gone to a referendum if it had been rejected by either Governor Angus King or the Maine Legislature, since the bill was initiated by referendum. The year prior, the United States Congress passed the Defense of Marriage Act (DOMA; French: Loi de défense du mariage), which banned federal recognition of same-sex marriages. DOMA was struck down by the U.S. Supreme Court in United States v. Windsor in 2013 and officially repealed in 2022, and the Maine law was repealed in 2012.

=== 2009 legislation ===
Same-sex marriage in the United States

In January 2009, Senator Dennis Damon introduced a bill titled An Act To End Discrimination in Civil Marriage and Affirm Religious Freedom to allow same-sex couples to marry in Maine. A public hearing took place on April 22 at the Augusta Civic Center because of high levels of interest. The legislation extended the right to refuse to perform same-sex marriages to any "person authorized to join persons in marriage" rather than to clergy only. It did not require that such refusals be based on religious beliefs. The act also maintained the requirement for genetic counseling in marriage between first cousins of the opposite sex and expanded it to include first cousins of the same sex, despite the inability of persons of the same sex to conceive a child together. Governor John Baldacci previously opposed allowing same-sex couples to marry, but said he was keeping an "open mind".

On April 28, 2009, the Joint Committee on Judiciary endorsed the bill. The vote was 11 in favor, 2 against, and 1 recommending that the issue be sent to the voters via a referendum. On April 30, the Senate approved the bill 20–15 in a preliminary vote accepting the Judiciary Committee's majority "Ought To Pass" report. That same day, senators rejected an amendment that would have sent the same-sex marriage question to voters in a referendum, and passed the bill by a final vote of 21–14. It passed the House of Representatives 89–58 on May 5, and was sent back to the Senate for a final vote on enactment. Governor Baldacci signed the bill into law the following day. Baldacci became the first governor in the nation to sign a same-sex marriage law. The law was due to take effect 90 days after the Legislature adjourned.

April 30, 2009 vote in the Senate
Political affiliation	Voted for	Voted against	Absent (Did not vote)
Democratic Party	19: Justin Alfond; Phil Bartlett; Larry Bliss; Peter Bowman; Joseph Brannigan; Bruce Bryant; Margaret Craven; Dennis Damon; William Diamond; Stan Gerzofsky; Seth Goodall; Barry Hobbins; Lisa Marrache; Libby Mitchell; John Nutting; Joe Perry; Elizabeth Schneider; Deborah Simpson; Nancy Sullivan	2: David Hastings; Troy Jackson	–
Republican Party	2: Peter Mills; Chris Rector	12: Jonathan Courtney; Gerald Davis; Walter Gooley; Earle McCormick; Richard Nass; Debra Plowman; Kevin Raye; Richard Rosen; Roger Sherman; Douglas Smith; David Trahan; Carol Weston	–
Total	21	14	0
Total	60.0%	40.0%	0.0%

May 5, 2009 vote in the House of Representatives
Political affiliation	Voted for	Voted against	Absent (Did not vote)
Democratic Party	82: Herb Adams; Paulette Beaudoin; Henry Beck; Seth Berry; Anna Blodgett; Andrea Boland; Brian Bolduc; Mark Bryant; Steven Butterfield II; Emily Cain; Michael Carey; Alan Casavant; Richard Cleary; Joan Cohen; Gary Connor; Alexander Cornell du Houx; Patsy Crockett; Cynthia Dill; Stacy Dostie; Timothy Driscoll; Robert Duchesne; Robert Eaton; Jane Eberle; Mark Eves; Sean Flaherty; Elspeth Flemings; Paul Gilbert; Adam Goode; Charles Harlow; Anne Haskell; Teresea Hayes; Dawn Hill; Jon Hinck; Robert Hunt; Melissa Innes Walsh; Patricia Jones; Bryan Kaenrath; Peter Kent; Charles Kruger; Edward Legg; Stephen Lovejoy; Bruce MacDonald; Michael Magnan; James Martin; Edward Mazurek; Jeff McCabe; Elizabeth Miller; Terry Morrison; Mary Nelson; Andrew O'Brien; Peggy Pendleton; Ann Peoples; Leila Percy; Anne Perry; Matthew Peterson; Wendy Pieh; Donald Pilon; Hannah Pingree; John Piotti; Charles Priest; Helen Rankin; Peggy Rotundo; Diane Russell; Linda Sanborn; James Schatz; Michael Shaw; Lawrence Sirois; Nancy Smith; Sara Stevens; Peter Stuckey; Patricia Sutherland; Sharon Treat; Pamela Trinward; Linda Valentino; David Van Wie; Joseph Wagner; Richard Wagner; Thomas Watson; David Webster; Joan Welsh; Walter Wheeler; Thomas Wright	12: Stephen Beaudette; Richard Blanchard; Sheryl Briggs; Herbert Clark; Edward Finch; Stephen Hanley; George Hogan; Michel Lajoie; John Martin; Charles Theriault; John Tuttle; Michael Willette	1: Benjamin Pratt
Republican Party	7: Michael Beaulieu; James Campbell; Patrick Flood; Jayne Crosby Giles; Kerri Prescott; David Richardson; Meredith Strang Burgess	46: Susan Austin; Bernard Ayotte; Bruce Bickford; William Browne; David Burns; Richard Cebra; Kathleen Chase; Tyler Clark; David Cotta; Dale Crafts; Dean Cray; Jarrod Crockett; Philip Curtis; Andre Cushing III; Paul Davis; Peter Edgecomb; Stacey Fitts; Kenneth Fletcher; Leslie Fossel; Jeffery Gifford; James Hamper; Lance Harvell; Peter Johnson; Henry Joy; Jane Knapp; Gary Knight; Brian Langley; Sarah Lewin; Howard McFadden; Jonathan McKane; Everett McLeod; Sawin Millett; Joan Nass; Robert Nutting; Wright Pinkham; Gary Plummer; Wesley Richardson; John Robinson; Ralph Sarty; Tom Saviello; Richard Sykes; Joshua Tardy; Michael Thibodeau; Douglas Thomas; Dianne Tilton; Windol Weaver	3: Michael Celli; Chris Greeley; Kimberley Rosen
Total	89	58	4
Total	58.9%	38.4%	2.6%

The day after Governor Baldacci signed the act, opponents of same-sex marriage launched a campaign to repeal it through a voter referendum. The campaign was successful in placing the question on the ballot, as Question 1, and on November 3, 2009, it passed by a vote of 53% to 47%, repealing the law.

=== 2012 initiative ===
Results of Question 1 (2012) by county: Yes 60–70% 50–60% / No 60–70% 50–60%

On June 30, 2011, EqualityMaine and Gay & Lesbian Advocates & Defenders (GLAD) announced plans to place a voter initiative in support of same-sex marriage on Maine's November 2012 ballot. The title of the citizen initiative was An Act to Allow Marriage Licenses for Same-Sex Couples and Protect Religious Freedom, and the initial text of their proposed ballot question was:

Do you favor a law allowing marriage licenses for same-sex couples that protects religious freedom by ensuring no religion or clergy be required to perform such a marriage in violation of their religious beliefs?

On January 26, 2012, supporters delivered over 105,000 petition signatures for the initiative to the Secretary of State's office, exceeding the minimum of 57,277 required signatures. The Secretary of State announced on February 23 that the office verified 85,216 signatures, qualifying it for the November 2012 ballot as Question 1. The campaign to legalize marriage for same-sex couples in Maine was led by a group called Mainers United for Marriage. Several groups had also formed in opposition. On July 27, Secretary of State Charlie Summers released the final wording of the ballot question. (Note: Voters were asked: "Do you want to allow the State of Maine to issue marriage licenses to same-sex couples?")

On November 6, 2012, in a reversal of the vote three years earlier, Maine became one of the first U.S. states to approve same-sex marriage through a ballot initiative and the fifth New England state to legalize same-sex marriage. The results were a reverse of those seen in the 2009 referendum, with 53 percent in favor and 47 percent opposed. Maryland and Washington voters also approved same-sex marriage the same day. The law provides that same-sex marriages "validly licensed and certified in another jurisdiction [must be] recognized for all purposes under the laws of this State". Further, the definition of marriage in Maine is now the following:

Marriage is the legally recognized union of 2 people. Gender-specific terms relating to the marital relationship or familial relationships must be construed to be gender-neutral for all purposes throughout the law, whether in the context of statute, administrative or court rule, policy, common law or any other source of civil law. [M.R.S. Title 19-A, §650-A]

The law took effect on December 29, 2012, 30 days after the election results were certified by Governor Paul LePage on November 29. The 29th being a Saturday, most town and city offices would not be open until Monday, December 31, to issue marriage licenses. However, Augusta and Gardiner announced that they would open with limited hours on the 29th to issue licenses. Brunswick said they would issue licenses from 9 a.m. to noon that day, but by appointment only. Portland announced that they would open at 12:01 a.m. on the 29th to issue marriage licenses and perform weddings. City spokeswoman Nicole Clegg said that City Hall would be open until 3:01, but that anyone in line before then would be given service. Additionally, Portland and other communities, who planned to be open, stated that any couple who wanted a marriage license that day would be given one, not just same-sex couples. Some municipalities, such as Farmington, Lewiston and Auburn, said they would not open on the 29th, due to little demand in those locations. Some also stated that they could not afford to open, or saw no need to open just because the law was changed. The first same-sex couple to marry were Steven Bridges and Michael Snell, who married at Portland City Hall just after midnight at 12:25 a.m. More than 40 same-sex couples married in Maine that Saturday, December 29, in at least 10 municipalities: Augusta, Bangor, Brewer, Brunswick, Falmouth, Freeport, Gardiner, Hallowell, Portland, and South Portland.

=== Developments after legalization ===
Both U.S. senators from Maine, Republican Susan Collins and Independent Angus King, support same-sex marriage.

In October 2015, the Maine Supreme Judicial Court held that same-sex marriages performed out-of-state before Maine's marriage law went into effect in December 2012 are valid. In Kinney v. Busch, the court declined to answer a reported question on the issue, ruling that there was no "substantial doubt" about the legal question. It quoted the U.S. Supreme Court's Obergefell v. Hodges ruling to the effect that "there is no lawful basis for a State to refuse to recognize a lawful same-sex marriage performed in another State on the ground of its same-sex character." The case involved a lesbian couple, Elizabeth Kinney and Tanya Busch, who had married in Massachusetts in 2008, but had sought a divorce in 2013. The couple disagreed on the effective date of their marriage—when licensed in Massachusetts in 2008 or when Maine's law became effective in 2012—as this had implications on martial property in the divorce proceedings.

=== Native American nations ===
The Indian Civil Rights Act primarily aims to protect the rights of Native Americans but also reinforces the principle of tribal self-governance. While it does not grant sovereignty, the Act affirms the authority of tribes to govern their own legal affairs. Consequently, many tribes have enacted their own marriage and family laws. As a result, the 2012 state law and the Supreme Court's Obergefell ruling did not automatically apply to tribal jurisdictions. State law grants the Penobscot Nation, the Passamaquoddy Tribe, and the Houlton Band of Maliseet Indians jurisdiction over the marriages and divorces of tribal members. Although it is unclear whether same-sex marriage is legal on their reservations, the tribes do recognize customary marriages performed according to Indigenous traditions. Wayne Mitchell, the Penobscot non-voting tribal representative in the House of Representatives, urged lawmakers to pass the same-sex marriage bill in 2009, stating, "You know there's only eight letters in the word equality. This state is almost 200 years old. We haven't gotten there ... I know. I come from a group of people who knows what the word equality means. And we also know what it doesn't mean. It would be nice, ladies and gentlemen of the House, if we could today become fully cognizant of the meaning of those eight letters." Representative Madonna Soctomah, the Passamaquoddy tribal representative, was a co-sponsor of the 2009 bill.

Native Americans have deep-rooted marriage traditions, placing a strong emphasis on community, family and spiritual connections. Abenaki marriages (nibaw8gan) incorporate spiritual practices such as smudging, traditional clothing, feasting, dancing (nibaowipmegaw8gan), as well as marriage vows (ibawi wlitow8gan) guided by the elders. Marriages were exogamous, patrilineal and mostly monogamous, though chiefs (s8gm8) occasionally practiced polygyny. Likewise, Maliseet marriages (nipuwuwakon) were traditionally monogamous, with bride service also required. Chiefs (sakom) could also practice polygyny.

=== Economic impact ===
A University of California, Los Angeles research study from February 2009 estimated that extending marriage to same-sex couples in Maine would have a positive impact on the state's economy and budget. The study found that same-sex weddings and associated tourism would generate $60 million in additional spending in Maine over three years, creating 1,000 new jobs. The state would see an increase of $3.6 million in revenues over the next three years, resulting from increased sales tax revenues of approximately $3.1 million and new marriage license fees of $500,000. In calculating the net benefit to the state, the study approximated that half of Maine's 4,644 same-sex couples, or 2,316 couples, would marry in the first three years that marriage is available to them. The study also estimated that approximately 15,657 same-sex couples from other states would come to Maine to marry.

=== Marriage statistics ===
In the twelve months that followed the implementation of same-sex marriage in Maine, a total of 1,530 same-sex couples had married, according to the state's Office of Data, Research and Vital Statistics. This comprised 16% of all marriages recorded in Maine in that time. Marriages between women outpaced marriages between men by a tally of 970 to 560.

The 2020 U.S. census showed that there were 3,385 married same-sex couple households (1,464 male couples and 2,421 female couples) and 2,697 unmarried same-sex couple households in Maine.

== Public opinion ==
Public opinion for same-sex marriage in Maine
Poll source	Dates administered	Sample size	Margin of error	Support	Opposition	Do not know / refused
Public Religion Research Institute	February 28 – December 8, 2025	170 adults	?	74%	25%	1%
Public Religion Research Institute	March 13 – December 2, 2024	168 adults	?	69%	28%	3%
Public Religion Research Institute	March 9 – December 7, 2023	167 adults	?	67%	30%	3%
Public Religion Research Institute	March 11 – December 14, 2022	?	?	82%	18%	<0.5%
Public Religion Research Institute	March 8 – November 9, 2021	?	?	75%	23%	2%
Public Religion Research Institute	January 7 – December 20, 2020	214 adults	?	77%	22%	1%
Public Religion Research Institute	April 5 – December 23, 2017	359 adults	?	71%	25%	4%
Public Religion Research Institute	May 18, 2016 – January 10, 2017	594 adults	?	59%	32%	9%
Public Religion Research Institute	April 29, 2015 – January 7, 2016	460 adults	?	56%	35%	9%
Public Religion Research Institute	April 2, 2014 – January 4, 2015	300 adults	?	63%	30%	7%
New York Times/CBS News/YouGov	September 20 – October 1, 2014	1,531 likely voters	± 2.8%	63%	27%	10%
Public Policy Polling	November 8–11, 2013	964 voters	± 3.2%	54%	37%	9%
Public Policy Polling	August 23–25, 2013	953 registered voters	± 3.2%	53%	38%	9%
Public Policy Polling	January 18–20, 2013	1,268 voters	± 2.8%	53%	43%	4%
Public Policy Polling	November 1–2, 2012	1,633 likely voters	± 2.4%	53%	42%	5%
Public Policy Polling	September 17–18, 2012	804 likely voters	± 3.5%	52%	40%	8%
Maine People's Resource Center	March 31 – April 2, 2012	993 registered voters	± 3.1%	58%	40%	2%
Public Policy Polling	March 2–4, 2012	1,256 voters	± 2.8%	54%	41%	5%
Public Policy Polling	October 28–31, 2011	673 voters	± 3.8%	51%	42%	7%
Goodwin Simon Strategic Research	May 18–24, 2011	1,003 likely November 2012 voters	± 3.1%	53%	39%	8%
Public Policy Polling	March 3–6, 2011	1,247 voters	± 2.8%	47%	45%	8%

== See also ==
- Domestic partnership in Maine
- LGBT rights in Maine
- Same-sex marriage in the United States
