= 123rd Maine Senate =

2007 to 2008 legislative session

The 123rd Maine Senate had 35 members each elected to two-year terms in November 2006. The first regular session was sworn in on December 6, 2006.

The party composition of the 123rd Senate was:

- 18 Democrats
- 17 Republicans

== Leadership ==
Position	Name	Party	Residence	District
President	Betheda Edmonds	Democrat	Freeport	10
Majority Leader	Libby Mitchell	Democrat	Vassalboro	24
Minority Leader	Carol Weston	Republican	Montville	23

== Senators ==
District	Senator	Party	Residence
1	Peter Bowman	Republican	Kittery
2	Richard Nass	Republican	Acton
3	Jonathan Courtney	Republican	Springvale
4	Nancy B. Sullivan	Democrat	Biddeford
5	Barry Hobbins	Democrat	Saco
6	Philip Bartlett	Democrat	Gorham
7	Lynn Bromley	Democrat	South Portland
8	Ethan Strimling	Democrat	Portland
9	Joseph Brannigan	Democrat	Portland
10	Beth Edmonds	Democrat	Freeport
11	Karl W. Turner	Republican	Cumberland
12	G. William Diamond	Democrat	Windham
13	David Hastings	Republican	Fryeburg
14	Bruce Bryant	Democrat	Dixfield
15	Lois Snowe-Mello	Republican	Poland
16	Margaret Rotundo	Democrat	Lewiston
17	John Nutting	Democrat	Leeds
18	Walter Gooley	Republican	Farmington
19	Paula Benoit	Democrat	Phippsburg
20	Dana Dow	Republican	Waldoboro
21	Earle McCormick	Republican	West Gardiner
22	Christine Savage	Republican	Union
23	Carol Weston	Republican	Montville
24	Libby Mitchell	Democrat	Vassalboro
25	Lisa Marrache	Democrat	Waterville
26	S. Peter Mills	Republican	Skowhegan
27	Douglas Smith	Republican	Dover-Foxcroft
28	Dennis Damon	Democrat	Trenton
29	Kevin Raye	Republican	Perry
30	Elizabeth Schneider	Democrat	Orono
31	Richard Rosen	Republican	Bucksport
32	Joseph C. Perry	Democrat	Bangor
33	Debra Plowman	Republican	Hampden
34	Roger Sherman	Republican	Hodgdon
35	John L. Martin	Democrat	Eagle Lake

== See also ==
- List of Maine State Senators
- List of Maine state legislatures
