= 124th Maine Senate =

2009 to 2010 legislative session

Below is a list of the members of the 124th Maine Senate, which were sworn into office on December 3, 2008, and left office in December 2010.

On December 3, Libby Mitchell (D-Kennebec) was the only candidate nominated for President of the Maine Senate and was subsequently elected Senate President.

The 124th Senate consisted of 21 Democrats and 14 Republicans. In April 2009, the Maine Senate approved LD 1020 with a 21–14 vote. The bill if enacted allowed same-sex couples to marry. The bill ultimately passed the Maine Legislature as a whole and was signed by Governor John Baldacci before being repealed via a people's veto in November 2009.

== State senators ==
- 1 Peter Bowman (D) of Kittery, York County
- 2 Richard Nass (R) of Acton, York County
- 3 Jonathan Courtney (R) of Sanford, York County
- 4 Nancy Sullivan (D) of Biddeford, York County
- 5 Barry Hobbins (D) of Saco, York County
- 6 Phil Bartlett (D) of Gorham, Cumberland County
- 7 Larry Bliss (D) of South Portland, Cumberland County
- 8 Justin Alfond (D) of Portland, Cumberland County
- 9 Joseph Brannigan (D) of Portland, Cumberland County
- 10 Stan Gerzofsky (D) of Brunswick, Cumberland County
- 11 Gerald Davis (R) of Falmouth, Cumberland County
- 12 G. William Diamond (D) of Windham, Cumberland County
- 13 David Hastings (D) of Fryeburg, Oxford County
- 14 Bruce Bryant (D) of Dixfield, Oxford County
- 15 Deborah Simpson (D) of Auburn, Androscoggin County
- 16 Margaret Craven (D) of Lewiston, Androscoggin County
- 17 John Nutting (D) of Leeds, Androscoggin County
- 18 Walter Gooley (R) of Farmington, Franklin County
- 19 Seth Goodall (D) Richmond, Sagadahoc County
- 20 David Trahan (R) of Waldoboro, Lincoln County
- 21 Earle McCormick (R) of West Gardiner, Kennebec County
- 22 Chris Rector(R) of Thomaston, Knox County
- 23 Carol Weston (R) of Montville, Waldo County
- 24 Libby Mitchell (D) of Vassalboro, Kennebec County
- 25 Lisa Marrache (D) of Waterville, Kennebec County
- 26 S. Peter Mills (R) of Cornville, Somerset County
- 27 Douglas Smith (R), Dover-Foxcroft, Piscataquis County
- 28 Dennis Damon (D) of Trenton, Hancock County
- 29 Kevin Raye (R) of Perry, Washington County
- 30 Elizabeth Schneider (D) of Orono, Penobscot County
- 31 Richard Rosen (R) of Bucksport, Penobscot County
- 32 Joseph Perry (D) of Bangor, Penobscot County
- 33 Debra Plowman (R) of Hampden, Penobscot County
- 34 Roger Sherman (R) of Hodgdon, Aroostook County
- 35 Troy Jackson (D) of Allagash, Aroostook County

== See also ==
- List of Maine state legislatures
