= 122nd Maine Senate =

2005 to 2006 legislative session

Below is a list of the members of the 122nd Maine Senate, which were sworn into office on December 1, 2004 and left office in December 2006.

On December 1, Beth Edmonds (D-Cumberland) and Paul Davis (R-Piscataquis) were nominated for President of the Maine Senate. After a secret ballot, Edmonds was elected Senate President.

== Current Leadership ==
Position	Name	Party	Residence	District
President	Betheda Edmonds	Democrat	Freeport	10
Majority Leader	Michael F. Brennan	Democrat	Portland	9
Minority Leader	Paul T. Davis	Republican	Sangerville	27

== Senators ==
District	Senator	Party	Residence	County
1	Mary Black Andrews	Republican	York	York County
2	Richard Nass	Republican	Acton	York County
3	Jonathan Courtney	Republican	Springvale	York County
4	Nancy B. Sullivan	Democrat	Biddeford	York County
5	Barry Hobbins	Democrat	Saco	York County
6	Philip Bartlett	Democrat	Gorham	Cumberland County
7	Lynn Bromley	Democrat	South Portland	Cumberland County
8	Ethan Strimling	Democrat	Portland	Cumberland County
9	Michael F. Brennan	Democrat	Portland	Cumberland County
10	Betheda Edmonds	Democrat	Freeport	Cumberland County
11	Karl W. Turner	Republican	Cumberland	Cumberland County
12	G. William Diamond	Democrat	Windham	Cumberland County
13	David Hastings	Republican	Fryeburg	Oxford County
14	Bruce Bryant	Democrat	Dixfield	Oxford County
15	Lois Snowe-Mello	Republican	Poland	Androscoggin County
16	Margaret Rotundo	Democrat	Lewiston	Androscoggin County
17	John Nutting	Democrat	Leeds	Kennebc County
18	Chandler Woodcock	Republican	Farmington	Franklin County
19	Arthur Mayo	Democrat	Bath	Sagadahoc County
20	Dana Dow	Republican	Waldoboro	Lincoln County
21	Scott Cowger	Democrat	Hallowell	Kennebec County
22	Christine Savage	Republican	Union	Knox County
23	Carol Weston	Republican	Montville	Waldo County
24	Elizabeth H. Mitchell	Democrat	Vassalboro	Kennebec County
25	Kenneth Gagnon	Democrat	Waterville	Kennebec County
26	Peter Mills	Republican	Skowhegan	Somerset County
27	Paul T. Davis	Republican	Sangerville	Piscataquis County
28	Dennis Damon	Democrat	Trenton	Hancock County
29	Kevin Raye	Republican	Perry	Washington County
30	Elizabeth M. Schneider	Democrat	Orono	Penobscot County
31	Richard Rosen	Republican	Bucksport	Hancock County
32	Joseph C. Perry	Democrat	Bangor	Penobscot County
33	Debra Plowman	Republican	Hampden	Penobscot County
34	Dean Clukey	Republican	Houlton	Aroostook County
35	John L. Martin	Democrat	Eagle Lake	Aroostook County

== See also ==
- List of members of the Maine State House of Representatives
- List of Maine state legislatures
