= 118th Maine Senate =

1997 to 1998 legislative session

Below is a list of the members of the 118th Maine Senate, which were sworn into office in December 1996 and left office in December 1998.

Mark Lawrence (D) of South Berwick served as President of the Maine Senate.

- 1 Judy Paradis (D) of St. Agatha, Aroostook County
- 2 Leo Kieffer (R) of Caribou, Aroostook County
- 3 Mike Michaud (D) of Millinocket, Penobscot County
- 4 Vinton Cassidy (R) of Calais, Washington County
- 5 Jill Goldthwait (U) of Bar Harbor, Hancock County
- 6 Richard Ruhlin Sr. (D) of Brewer, Penobscot County
- 7 Mary Cathcart (D) of Orono, Penobscot County
- 8 Stephen Hall (R) of Guilford, Piscataquis County
- 9 Robert Murray (D) of Bangor, Penobscot County
- 10 Betty Lou Mitchell (R) of Etna, Penobscot County
- 11 Susan Longley (D) of Liberty, Waldo County
- 12 Chellie Pingree (D) of North Haven, Knox County
- 13 Peter Mills (R) of Cornville, Somerset County
- 14 Richard Carey (D) of Belgrade, Kennebec County
- 15 Beverly Daggett (D) of Augusta, Kennebec County
- 16 Marjoie Kilkelly (D) of Wiscasset, Lincoln County
- 17 John Benoit (R) of Sandy River Plantation, Franklin County
- 18 Sharon Treat (D) of Hallowell, Kennebec County
- 19 Mary Small (R) of Bath, Sagadahoc County
- 20 John Nutting (D) of Leeds, Androscoggin County
- 21 John Jenkins (D) of Auburn, Androscoggin County
- 22 John Cleveland (D) of Auburn, Androscoggin County
- 23 Phil Harriman (R) of Yarmouth, Cumberland County
- 24 Norman Ferguson (R) of Hanover, Oxford County
- 25 Rick Bennett (R) of Oxford, Oxford
- 26 Jeffrey Butland (R) of Cumberland, Cumberland County
- 27 Joel Abromson (R) of Portland, Cumberland County
- 28 Anne Rand (D) of Portland, Cumberland County
- 29 William O'Gara (D) of Westbrook, Cumberland County
- 30 Jane Amero (R) of Cape Elizabeth, Cumberland County
- 31 Peggy Pendleton (D) of Scarborough, Cumberland County
- 32 Lloyd LaFontain (D) of Biddeford, York County
- 33 Bruce MacKinnon (R) of Springvale, York County
- 34 James Libby (R) of Buxton, York County
- 35 Mark Lawrence (D) of South Berwick, York County Senate President

== See also ==
- List of Maine state legislatures
