= 121st Maine Senate =

2003 to 2004 legislative session

Below is a list of the members of the 121st Maine Senate, which were sworn into office in December 2002 and left office in December 2004.

On November 25, Rick Bennett (R-Oxford) and Beverly Daggett (D-Kennebec) were nominated for President of the Maine Senate. After a secret ballot, Daggett was elected Senate President.

== State senators ==
- 1 John L. Martin (D) of Eagle Lake, Aroostook County
- 2 Richard Kneeland, Easton, Aroostook County
- 3 Stephen S. Stanley, Medway, Penobscot County
- 4 Kevin Shorey, Calais, Washington County
- 5 Dennis Damon (D) of Trenton, Hancock County
- 6 Edward Youngblood (R) of Brewer, Penobscot County
- 7 Mary Cathcart (D) of Orono, Penobscot County
- 8 Paul Davis Sr., Sangerville, Piscataquis County
- 9 W. Tom Sawyer Jr. of Bangor, Penobscot County
- 10 Betty Lou Mitchell (R) of Etna, Penobscot County
- 11 Carol Weston (R) of Montville, Waldo County
- 12 Christine R. Savage of Union, Knox County
- 13 Pamela Hatch of Skowhegan, Somerset County
- 14 Kenneth Gagnon of Waterville, Kennebec County
- 15 Beverly Daggett (D) of Augusta, Kennebec County
- 16 Christopher G. L. Hall of Bristol, Lincoln County
- 17 Chandler Woodcock of Farmington, Franklin County
- 18 Sharon Treat (D) of Hallowell, Kennebec County
- 19 Arthur Mayo, of Bath, Sagadahoc County
- 20 Kenneth Blais of Litchfield, Kennebec County
- 21 Margaret Rotundo (D) of Lewiston, Androscoggin County
- 22 Neria R. Douglass of Auburn, Androscoggin County
- 23 Beth Edmonds (D) of Freeport, Cumberland County
- 24 Bruce Bryant of Dixfield, Oxford County
- 25 Rick Bennett (R) of Oxford, Oxford County
- 26 Karl Turner, of Cumberland, Cumberland County
- 27 Michael Brennan (D) of Portland, Cumberland County
- 28 Ethan Strimling (D) of Portland, Cumberland County
- 29 Carolyn M. Gilman of Westbrook, Cumberland County
- 30 Lynn Bromley (D) of South Portland, Cumberland County
- 31 Peggy Pendleton (D) of Scarborough, Cumberland County
- 32 Lloyd LaFontain (D) of Biddeford, York County
- 33 David L. Carpenter, Sanford, York County
- 34 Richard Nass of Acton, York County
- 35 Kenneth F. Lemont, Kittery, York County

== See also ==
- List of Maine state legislatures
