= 117th Maine Senate =

1995 to 1996 legislative session

Below is a list of the members of the 117th Maine Senate, which were sworn into office in December 1994 and left office in December 1996.

- 1 Judy Paradis (D) of St. Agatha, Aroostook County
- 2 Carolyne Mahany (D) of Easton, Aroostook County
- 3 Mike Michaud (D) of Millinocket, Penobscot County
- 4 Vinton Cassidy (R) of Calais, Washington County
- 5 Jill Goldthwait (U) of Bar Harbor, Hancock County
- 6 Richard Ruhlin Sr. (D) of Brewer, Penobscot County
- 7 John O'Dea (D) of Orono, Penobscot County
- 8 Stephen Hall (R) of Guilford, Piscataquis County
- 9 Sean Faircloth (D) of Bangor, Penobscot County
- 10 Alton Cianchette (D) of Pittsfield, Somerset County
- 11 Susan Longley (D) of Liberty, Waldo County
- 12 Chellie Pingree (D) of North Haven, Knox County
- 13 Peter Mills (R) of Cornville, Somerset County
- 14 Richard Carey (D) of Belgrade, Kennebec County
- 15 Beverly Bustin (D) of Hallowell, Kennebec County
- 16 Charles Begley (R) of Waldoboro, Lincoln County
- 17 John Benoit (R) of Sandy River Plantation, Franklin County
- 18 Dale McCormick (D) of Monmouth, Kennebec County
- 19 Mary Small (R) of Bath, Sagadahoc County
- 20 Albert Stevens (R) of Sabattus, Androscoggin County
- 21 Georgette Berube (D) of Lewiston, Androscoggin County
- 22 John Cleveland (D) of Auburn, Androscoggin County
- 23 Phil Harriman (R) of Yarmouth, Cumberland County
- 24 Norman Ferguson (R) of Hanover, Oxford County
- 25 Dana Hanley (R) of South Paris, Oxford County
- 26 Jeffrey Butland (R) of Cumberland, Cumberland County
- 27 Joel Abromson (R) of Portland, Cumberland County
- 28 Anne Rand (D) of Portland, Cumberland County
- 29 Donald Esty, Jr. (D) of Westbrook, Cumberland County
- 30 Jane Amero (R) of Cape Elizabeth, Cumberland County
- 31 Joan Pendexter (R) of Scarborough, Cumberland County
- 32 John Hathaway (R) of Kennebunkport, Cumberland County
- 33 David Carpenter (R) of Springvale, York County
- 34 Willis Lord (R) of Waterboro, York County
- 35 Mark Lawrence (D) of South Berwick, York County

== See also ==
- List of Maine state legislatures
