= 116th Maine Senate =

1993 to 1994 legislative session

Below is a list of the members of the 116th Maine Senate, which were sworn into office in December 1992 and left office in December 1994.

- 1 Raynold Theriault (R) of Fort Kent, Aroostook County
- 2 Leo Kieffer (R) of Caribou, Aroostook County
- 3 Margaret Ludwig (R) of Houlton, Aroostook County
- 4 Charlie Webster (R) of Farmington, Franklin County
- 5 Charles P. Pray (D) of Millinocket, Penobscot County
- 6 Michael Pearson (D) of Enfield, Penobscot County
- 7 Vinton Cassidy (R) of Calais, Washington County
- 8 M. Ida Luther (D) of Mexico, Oxford County
- 9 Alton Cianchette (D) of Pittsfield, Somerset County
- 10 John Baldacci (D) of Bangor, Penobscot County
- 11 John O'Dea (D) of Orono, Penobscot County
- 12 Ruth Foster (R) of Ellsworth, Hancock County
- 13 Harold Marden (R) of Albion, Kennebec County
- 14 Robert Gould (R) of Belfast, Waldo County
- 15 Dana Hanley (R) of South Paris, Oxford County
- 16 Georgette Berube (D) of Lewiston, Androscoggin County
- 17 Richard Carey (D) of Belgrade, Kennebec County
- 18 Dale McCormick (D) of Monmouth, Kennebec County
- 19 Beverly Bustin (D) of Hallowell, Kennebec County
- 20 Charles Begley (R) of Waldoboro, Lincoln County
- 21 Chellie Pingree (D) of North Haven, Knox County
- 22 John Cleveland (D) of Auburn, Androscoggin County
- 23 James R. Handy (D) of Lewiston, Androscoggin County
- 24 Pamela Cahill (R) of Woolwich, Sagadahoc County
- 25 Bonnie Titcomb (D) of Casco, Cumberland County
- 26 Phil Harriman (R) of Yarmouth, Cumberland County
- 27 Jeffrey Butland (R) of Cumberland, Cumberland County
- 28 Donald Esty, Jr. (D) of Westbrook, Cumberland County
- 29 Joseph Brannigan (D) of Portland, Cumberland County
- 30 Gerard P. Conley, Jr. (D) of Portland, Cumberland County
- 31 Charles E. Summers, Jr. (R) of Scarborough, Cumberland County
- 32 Jane A. Amero (R) of Cape Elizabeth, Cumberland County
- 33 David L. Carpenter (R) of Sanford, York County
- 34 Dennis L. Dutremble (D) of Biddeford, York County
- 35 Mark W. Lawrence (R) of Kittery, York County

== See also ==
- List of Maine state legislatures
