= 128th Maine Senate =

2017 to 2018 legislative session

The 128th Maine Senate had 35 members each elected to two-year terms in November 2016. The first regular session was sworn in on December 6, 2016.

The 128th Senate party composition was:

- 18 Republicans
- 17 Democrats

== Leadership ==
Position	Name	Party	Residence	County
President	Michael Thibodeau	Republican	Winterport	Waldo
Majority Leader	Garrett Mason	Republican	Lisbon	Androscoggin
Assistant Majority Leader	Andre Cushing III	Republican	Hampden	Penobscot
Minority Leader	Troy Jackson	Democrat	Allagash	Aroostook
Assistant Minority Leader	Nate Libby	Democrat	Lewiston	Androscoggin

== Senators ==
District	Senator	Party	Municipality	County
1	Troy Jackson	Democrat	Allagash	Aroostook
2	Michael E. Carpenter	Democrat	Houlton	Aroostook
3	Rodney Whittemore	Republican	Skowhegan	Somerset
4	Paul T. Davis	Republican	Sangerville	Piscataquis
5	James Dill	Democrat	Old Town	Penobscot
6	Joyce Maker	Republican	Calais	Washington
7	Brian Langley	Republican	Ellsworth	Hancock
8	Kimberly Rosen	Republican	Bucksport	Hancock
9	Geoffrey Gratwick	Democrat	Bangor	Penobscot
10	Andre Cushing III	Republican	Hampden	Penobscot
11	Michael Thibodeau	Republican	Winterport	Waldo
12	David Miramant	Democrat	Camden	Knox
13	Dana Dow	Republican	Waterboro	Lincoln
14	Shenna Bellows	Democrat	Manchester	Kennebec
15	Roger Katz	Republican	Augusta	Kennebec
16	Scott Cyrway	Republican	Benton	Kennebec
17	Tom Saviello	Republican	Wilton	Franklin
18	Lisa Keim	Republican	Dixfield	Oxford
19	James Hamper	Republican	Oxford	Oxford
20	Eric Brakey	Republican	Auburn	Androscoggin
21	Nate Libby	Democrat	Lewiston	Androscoggin
22	Garrett Mason	Republican	Lisbon	Androscoggin
23	Eloise Vitelli	Democrat	Topsham	Sagadahoc
24	Brownie Carson	Democrat	Brunswick	Cumberland
25	Cathy Breen	Democrat	Falmouth	Cumberland
26	G. William Diamond	Democrat	Windham	Cumberland
27	Ben Chipman	Democrat	Portland	Cumberland
28	Mark Dion	Democrat	Portland	Cumberland
29	Rebecca Millett	Democrat	Cape Elizbath	Cumberland
30	Amy Volk	Republican	Scarborough	Cumberland
31	Justin Chenette	Democrat	Saco	York
32	Susan Deschambault	Democrat	Biddeford	York
33	David Woodsome	Republican	Waterboro	York
34	Ronald F. Collins	Republican	Wells	York
35	Dawn Hill	Democrat	York	York

== See also ==
- List of Maine State Senators
- List of Maine state legislatures
