= G. Steven Rowe =

American politician

54th Attorney General of Maine
- In office January 6, 2001 – January 6, 2009
- Governor: Angus King; John Baldacci
- Preceded by: Andrew Ketterer
- Succeeded by: Janet Mills

Speaker of the Maine House of Representatives
- In office December 3, 1998 – December 6, 2000
- Preceded by: Libby Mitchell
- Succeeded by: Michael V. Saxl

Member of the Maine House of Representatives from the 35th district
- In office December 7, 1994 – December 6, 2000
- Preceded by: Gerald A. Hillock
- Succeeded by: Joseph Brannigan

Member of the Maine House of Representatives from the 30th district
- In office December 2, 1992 – December 7, 1994
- Preceded by: Harriet Ketover
- Succeeded by: J. Elizabeth Mitchell

Personal details
- Born: Glen Steven Rowe; April 23, 1953 (age 73)
- Party: Democratic
- Spouse: Amanda (deceased)
- Children: 4
- Education: United States Military Academy (BS); University of Utah (MBA); University of Maine (JD)
- Occupation: President, Private Foundation

Glen Steven Rowe, commonly known as Steve Rowe (born April 23, 1953), is a former Maine politician. A Democrat, he first entered politics in 1992 as a member of the Maine House of Representatives. In 1998, he became the 94th Speaker of the Maine House of Representatives, serving until he was term-limited from the House in 2000. In 2001, Rowe was elected as the 54th Maine Attorney General, serving eight years in that position.

In 2009, Rowe became Counsel at Verrill Dana, a Portland law firm. He ran unsuccessfully for the Democratic nomination for Governor of Maine in 2010. He then returned to the practice of law, but in 2012 became President of the Endowment for Health, New Hampshire's largest health foundation. In 2015, Rowe assumed the position of President and CEO of the Maine Community Foundation. During his tenure from 2015 to 2021, he guided the development of a five-year strategic plan with programs addressing early childhood development, access to education, racial equity, support for older adults, and promotion of entrepreneurship and innovation. Under his leadership, the foundation also expanded its work on climate change, land conservation, high-speed internet access, and racial equity initiatives. He retired in 2021.

In 2023, Rowe received the Access to Justice Award from the Muskie Fund for Legal Services in recognition of his lifelong commitment to social, racial, economic, and environmental justice.

== Education ==
- JD, University of Maine School of Law, 1987
- MBA, University of Utah, 1978
- BS, United States Military Academy, West Point, 1975.

== Professional experience ==
- President and CEO, Maine Community Foundation, 2015-2021
- President, Endowment for Health, 2012-2015
- Counsel, Verrill Dana, 2009-2012
- Attorney General, State of Maine, 2001-2009
- Litigation Counsel, UNUM Provident Corporation, 1987–2000
- Manager, Fairchild Semiconductor, 1981–1984
- Officer, United States Army, 1975–1981

== Political experience ==
=== Maine House of Representatives ===
- Representative, Maine House of Representatives, 1992–2000
- Speaker, Maine House of Representatives, 1998–2000

=== Attorney General ===
Rowe served as Maine Attorney General from 2001–2009. During his tenure, he successfully argued two cases before the United States Supreme Court. In S.D. Warren Co. v. Maine Board of Environmental Protection (2006), he achieved a unanimous victory defending Maine's authority to enforce state water quality standards under the federal Clean Water Act. Justice David Souter, writing for the Court, quoted Maine Senator Edmund Muskie, the principal author of the Clean Water Act, in emphasizing that federal law preserved state authority to address water pollution.

He also argued Rowe v. New Hampshire Motor Transport Association (2008) before the Supreme Court, challenging federal preemption of Maine's tobacco regulation efforts.

As Attorney General, Rowe established the Fund for a Healthy Maine, which captured and invested perpetual annual settlement payments from tobacco manufacturers to improve Maine's public health through tobacco prevention, childcare, educational home visits for new parents, substance abuse prevention, and prescription drugs for the elderly and disabled. He also helped create the landmark Maine Rx Program, which provided discounted prescription drugs to the poor and elderly.

== Personal ==
Rowe was born and raised near Gore, Oklahoma. He was married to Amanda Rowe for 32 years, until she died in 2013. He has four children and lives in Portland, Maine.

Maine House of Representatives
Preceded by Harriet Ketover	Member of the Maine House of Representatives from the 30th district 1992–1994	Succeeded by J. Elizabeth Mitchell
Preceded by Gerald A. Hillock	Member of the Maine House of Representatives from the 35th district 1994–2000	Succeeded by Joseph Brannigan
Political offices
Preceded by Libby Mitchell	Speaker of the Maine House of Representatives; 1998–2000	Succeeded by Michael V. Saxl
Legal offices
Preceded by Andrew Ketterer	Attorney General of Maine; 2001–2009	Succeeded by Janet Mills
