= Senator Treat =

Senator Treat may refer to:

- Greg Treat (born 1978), Oklahoma State Senate
- Joseph B. Treat (1836–1919), Wisconsin State Senate
- Sharon Treat (born 1956), Maine State Senate
