= Senator Nass =

Senator Nass may refer to:

- Richard Nass (born 1943), Maine State Senate
- Stephen Nass (born 1952), Wisconsin State Senate
