= Senator Rector =

Senator Rector may refer to:

- Chris Rector (born 1951), Maine State Senate
- Henry Massey Rector (1816–1899), Arkansas State Senate
