= Senator Benoit =

Senator Benoit may refer to:

- John J. Benoit (1951–2016), California State Senate
- Paula Benoit (born 1955), Maine State Senate
