= Senator Edmonds =

Senator Edmonds may refer to:

- Beth Edmonds (born 1950), Maine State Senate
- John W. Edmonds (1799–1874), New York State Senate
- Rick Edmonds (born 1956), Louisiana State Senate
