= Anne Haskell =

American politician (born 1943)

Member of the Maine House of Representatives from the Gorham district
- In office 1988–1994

Member of the Maine House of Representatives from the 117th district
- In office 2006–2012
- Preceded by: Joseph Brannigan
- Succeeded by: Richard Farnsworth

Member of the Maine Senate from the 9th district
- In office 2012–2014
- Preceded by: Joseph Brannigan
- Succeeded by: redistricted

Member of the Maine Senate from the 28th district
- In office 2014–2016
- Preceded by: redistricted
- Succeeded by: Mark Dion

Personal details
- Born: August 12, 1943 (age 83) Portland, Maine
- Party: Democratic
- Spouse: Lou Haskell
- Education: University of Southern Maine

Anne M. Haskell (born August 12, 1943) is an American politician from Maine. A Democrat, Haskell represented part of Portland and Westbrook in the Maine Senate.

Haskell was first elected to the Gorham Town Council in 1986. She served on both the Gorham Town Council until 1989. In 1988, Haskell was elected to the Maine House of Representatives to represent a portion of Gorham. She served in the House from Gorham until 1994. In 2006, she was re-elected as a representative, this time from Portland's 117th district. Haskell was re-elected in 2008 and 2010. During the 2010–2012 term in the legislature, Haskell served as the ranking House Democrat on the legislature's Criminal Justice and Public Safety Committee.

During the 2012 United States Senate election, Haskell served as unenrolled Angus King's Cumberland County campaign chair.

She was elected to replace fellow Democrat Joseph Brannigan on November 6, 2012, defeating her Republican challenger with 72% of the vote. In July of the following year, following the resignation of Majority Leader Seth Goodall, Haskell was appointed Assistant Majority Leader of the Maine Senate.

Haskell retired from politics in 2016, and did not stand for re-election to the Maine Senate.

== Personal ==
Haskell was born and raised in Portland, Maine. She attended the University of Southern Maine.
