= Charles P. Pray =

American politician

Member of the Maine Senate from the Piscataquis County district
- In office 1975–1993
- Succeeded by: Stephen Hall

Personal details
- Born: August 15, 1945 (age 81) Millinocket, Maine, U.S.
- Party: Democrat
- Spouse: Nancy Deschaine (Deceased)
- Children: Damon, Jason
- Education: Ricker College
- Profession: Businessman

Charles P. Pray (born August 15, 1945) is an American politician from Maine. A Democrat, Pray served 18 years in the Maine Senate, representing rural Piscataquis County. He has described himself as "a progressive moderate with liberal tendencies but conservative perspectives."

== Early life and education ==
Pray was born in the paper mill town of Millinocket, Maine. He grew up in northern Piscataquis County, Maine attending a one-room schoolhouse from 1954 to 1959. He attended Maine Central Institute, graduating from Stearns High School in his birthplace of Millinocket in 1964. He then attended Ricker College in Houlton. In 1966, he enlisted with the US Air Force and served in Southeast Asia during the Vietnam War. Finishing with the Air Force in 1970, he returned to Maine and enrolled at the University of Maine, from which he graduated in 1973 with a B.A. in political science.

== Political career ==
In 1974, he was elected to the Maine Senate to represent Piscataquis County and the northern area of Penobscot County, which was the largest legislative district east of the Mississippi River. From 1978 to1982, Pray served as Assistant Majority Leader of the Maine Senate. From 1982 to 1984, Pray served as Majority Leader. In 1984, Pray was elected by his peers as President of the Maine Senate, a position he held until a surprise defeat in 1992. He is one of two individuals to serve four terms but is the only Senate President in Maine history to hold the office for 8 full years.

During the 1992 election, Pray was defeated by Stephen Hall of Guilford, which the Bangor Daily News called a "stunning defeat".

Following the end of his term in the Maine Senate, Pray held several positions at both the federal and state level. In the Clinton administration, he served as Special Assistant/Senior Adviser to the Assistant Secretary for Congressional & Intergovernmental Affairs at the United States Department of Energy in a Senior Executive Administration Service position in Washington, D.C. In 2003, Governor John Baldacci appointed Pray to the position of State Nuclear Safety Advisor following work he was involved with while at the Department of Energy. Pray served as Director of Congressional Affairs for the National Nuclear Security Administration in 2010 in the Obama Administration.

In 2011, Pray jumped into the debate on the proposed creation of a national park on land owned by Roxanne Quimby which was part of the Senate district Pray represented. He called for a comprehensive study of the effects of that a national park might have on not only tourism, but the entire economy of the region.

In late 2012 and early 2013, Pray served as the acting Town Manager for his home town of Millinocket, Maine. In July 2013 he was nominated by the Penobscot County Commissioners to serve a four-year term on the Maine Land Use Planning Commission, the State's planning commission for communities without a planning board and the vast unorganized territories of Maine.

In 2015, Pray was encouraged to fill the term of one of two vacant seats on the Millinocket Town Council where he received the top vote count. In 2016 he was elected to a full three-year term.

In July 2017, Pray was named Executive Director of the Maine County Commissioners Association representing Maine's sixteen counties operation a number of services including Registration of Deeds, Probate, Sheriffs, Jails, Emergency Management, Waste and other activities of services. In the position he interacts with municipal, State and federal entities as well as the sixteen counties assuring coordination a degree of uniformity of operations.

Pray remains active advising and outline strategies for elected and potential political candidates. He serves on the State Democratic Party's Executive Committee, Chairs the local tri-town Democratic Party Committee, serves as a member of the regional Housing Association, Vice Commander of the local Veterans' of Foreign Wars, a member of the American Legion Honor Guard and serves on several organizations. Pray remains active advising and outline strategies for elected and potential political candidates.
