= Thomas R. Watson =

American attorney and politician

Thom Watson

Member of the Maine House of Representatives from the 62nd district
- In office December 4, 2002 – May 3, 2010
- Preceded by: Arthur Mayo
- Succeeded by: Michael Clarke

Personal details
- Born: Thomas Riley Watson; March 11, 1947 (age 79) Minden, Louisiana, U.S.
- Party: Democratic
- Spouse: Sherry
- Education: University of South Carolina; Naval Postgraduate School; University of Maine

Military service
- Allegiance: United States
- Branch/service: United States Navy
- Battles/wars: Vietnam War

Thomas Riley Watson (born March 11, 1947) is an American attorney and politician who served as a member of the Maine House of Representatives. He resigned in 2010 in order to accept a position with the Maine Workers’ Compensation Board.
