= Richard G. Woodbury =

American politician

Member of the Maine Senate from the 11th district
- In office 2010–2014
- Preceded by: Gerald Davis
- Succeeded by: Cathy Breen

Member of the Maine House of Representatives from the 44th district
- In office 2002–2008
- Preceded by: John T. Buck
- Succeeded by: Melissa Walsh Innes

Personal details
- Born: October 10, 1961 (age 65) New Haven, Connecticut, U.S.
- Party: Unenrolled
- Spouse: Deborah Woodbury
- Profession: Economist

Richard Glen Woodbury (born October 10, 1961) is an American politician and economist from Maine. Woodbury served as an unenrolled State Senator from Maine's 11th District, representing part of Cumberland County, including the population centers of Falmouth and Cumberland as well as his residence in Yarmouth. He was first elected to the Maine State Senate in 2010 after defeating incumbent Republican Gerald Davis and Green Independent Chris Miller. The Democrat in the race, Cynthia Bullens, dropped out of the race and endorsed Woodbury, though her name remained on the ballot. He served three terms from 2002 to 2008 in the Maine House of Representatives. He has also been a visiting scholar with the Federal Reserve Bank of Boston and written extensively on tax reform in Maine.

== 126th Legislature ==
After winning a closely contested race for re-election in November 2012, Woodbury was the "policy architect" of a dramatic tax overhaul put forth by a bipartisan "Group of 11" legislators. Woodbury's tax plan called for the reduction in the state's income tax and increased consumption taxes as well as eliminating Maine's estate tax. The Portland Press Herald said the plan sought "to slash the state's income tax rate in half and make a host of other sweeping changes, including raising sales and excise taxes and eliminating exemptions".

Woodbury also introduced a resolution calling on Maine's congressional delegation to support a constitutional amendment to overturn the decision in Citizens United v. FEC and the notion of corporate personhood.

Woodbury announced on January 21, 2014, that he would not seek re-election.

Days before the 2014 general election, Woodbury and others began a statewide citizen's initiative to replace Maine's plurality voting system with a ranked choice voting system as is used in Australia and for electing the mayor of Portland, Maine, among other places.

== Personal ==
Woodbury's father, Robert Woodbury, was chancellor of the University of Maine System and ran for governor in 1994. Woodbury earned his B.A. from Williams College in 1983, his M.A. from Harvard University in 1988 and a Ph.D. in economics from Harvard in 1991. Woodbury has been an economist with National Bureau of Economic Research since 1998.
