= List of Maine state legislatures =

The legislature of the U.S. state of Maine has convened many times since statehood became effective on March 15, 1820. It continues to operate under the amended 1819 Constitution of Maine.

== Legislatures ==
Number	Name	Start date	End date	Last election
1	1st Maine Legislature	May 21, 1820	March 22, 1821	
2	2nd Maine Legislature	January 1822		September 1821
3	3rd Maine Legislature	January 1823		September 1822
4	4th Maine Legislature	January 1824		September 1823
5	5th Maine Legislature	January 1825		September 1824
6	6th Maine Legislature	1826		
7	7th Maine Legislature	1827		
8	8th Maine Legislature	1828		
9	9th Maine Legislature	1829		
10	10th Maine Legislature	1830		
11	11th Maine Legislature	1831		
12	12th Maine Legislature	1832		
13	13th Maine Legislature	1833		
14	14th Maine Legislature	1834		
15	15th Maine Legislature	1835		
16	16th Maine Legislature	1836		
17	17th Maine Legislature	1837		
18	18th Maine Legislature	1838		
19	19th Maine Legislature	1839		
20	20th Maine Legislature	1840		
21	21st Maine Legislature	1841		
22	22nd Maine Legislature	1842		
23	23rd Maine Legislature	1843		
24	24th Maine Legislature	1844		
25	25th Maine Legislature	1845		
26	26th Maine Legislature	1846		
27	27th Maine Legislature	1847		
28	28th Maine Legislature	1848		
29	29th Maine Legislature	1849		
30	30th Maine Legislature	1850		
31	31st Maine Legislature	1851		
32	32nd Maine Legislature	1853		
33	33rd Maine Legislature	1854		
34	34th Maine Legislature	1855		
35	35th Maine Legislature	1856		
36	36th Maine Legislature	1857		
37	37th Maine Legislature	1858		
38	38th Maine Legislature	1859		
39	39th Maine Legislature	1860		
40	40th Maine Legislature	1861		
41	41st Maine Legislature	1862		
42	42nd Maine Legislature	1863		
43	43rd Maine Legislature	1864		
44	44th Maine Legislature	1865		
45	45th Maine Legislature	1866		
46	46th Maine Legislature	1867		
47	47th Maine Legislature	1868		
48	48th Maine Legislature	1869		
49	49th Maine Legislature	1870		
50	50th Maine Legislature	1871		
51	51st Maine Legislature	1872		
52	52nd Maine Legislature	1873		
53	53rd Maine Legislature	1874		
54	54th Maine Legislature	1875		
55	55th Maine Legislature	1876		
56	56th Maine Legislature	1877		
57	57th Maine Legislature	1878		
58	58th Maine Legislature	1879		
59	59th Maine Legislature	1880		
60	60th Maine Legislature	1881		
61	61st Maine Legislature	1883		
62	62nd Maine Legislature	1885		
63	63rd Maine Legislature	1887		
64	64th Maine Legislature	1889		
65	65th Maine Legislature	1891	1892	
66	66th Maine Legislature	1893		
67	67th Maine Legislature	1895		
68	68th Maine Legislature	1897		
69	69th Maine Legislature	1899		
70	70th Maine Legislature	1901		
71	71st Maine Legislature	1903		
72	72nd Maine Legislature	1905		
73	73rd Maine Legislature	1907		
74	74th Maine Legislature	1909		
75	75th Maine Legislature	1911		
76	76th Maine Legislature	1913		
77	77th Maine Legislature	1915		
78	78th Maine Legislature	1917		
79	79th Maine Legislature	1919	1920	
80	80th Maine Legislature	1921		
81	81st Maine Legislature	1923		
82	82nd Maine Legislature	1925		
83	83rd Maine Legislature	1927		
84	84th Maine Legislature	1929		
85	85th Maine Legislature	1931		
86	86th Maine Legislature	1933	1934	
87	87th Maine Legislature	1935		
88	88th Maine Legislature	1937		
89	89th Maine Legislature	1939		
90	90th Maine Legislature	1941		
91	91st Maine Legislature	1943		
92	92nd Maine Legislature	1945		
93	93rd Maine Legislature	1947		
94	94th Maine Legislature	1949		
95	95th Maine Legislature	1951		
96	96th Maine Legislature	1953		
97	97th Maine Legislature	1955		
98	98th Maine Legislature	1957		
99	99th Maine Legislature	1959		
100	100th Maine Legislature	1961		
101	101st Maine Legislature	1963		
102	102nd Maine Legislature	1965		
103	103rd Maine Legislature	1967		
104	104th Maine Legislature	1969		
105	105th Maine Legislature	1971		
106	106th Maine Legislature	1973		
107	107th Maine Legislature	1975		
108	108th Maine Legislature	1977		
109	109th Maine Legislature	1979		
110	110th Maine Legislature	1981		
111	111th Maine Legislature	1983		
112	112th Maine Legislature	1985		
113	113th Maine Legislature	1987		
114	114th Maine Legislature	1989		
115	115th Maine Legislature	1991		
116	116th Maine Legislature; 116th Maine Senate	1993		
117	117th Maine Legislature; 117th Maine Senate	1995		
118	118th Maine Legislature; 118th Maine Senate	December 4, 1996	April 15, 1998	
119	119th Maine Legislature	1999		
120	120th Maine Legislature	2001		
121	121st Maine Legislature; 121st Maine Senate	2003		
122	122nd Maine Legislature; 122nd Maine Senate	December 1, 2004		
123	123rd Maine Legislature; 123rd Maine Senate	2007		
124	124th Maine Legislature; 124th Maine Senate	2009		November 4, 2008
125	125th Maine Legislature	December 1, 2010		November 2010
126	126th Maine Legislature	December 5, 2012		November 2012
127	127th Maine Legislature; 127th Maine Senate	December 3, 2014		November 2014
128	128th Maine Legislature; 128th Maine Senate	December 7, 2016		November 2016: Senate
129	129th Maine Legislature; 129th Maine Senate	December 5, 2018		November 2018: House, Senate
130	130th Maine Legislature; 130th Maine Senate	December 2, 2020		November 2020: House, Senate
131	131st Maine Legislature	December 7, 2022		November 2022: House, Senate
132	132nd Maine Legislature	2025		November 5, 2024: House, Senate

== See also ==
- List of speakers of the Maine House of Representatives
- List of presidents of the Maine Senate
- List of governors of Maine
- Politics of Maine
- Elections in Maine
- Maine State Capitol
- Historical outline of Maine
- Lists of United States state legislative sessions
