= 1984 United States Senate election in Maine =

- November 7, 1984
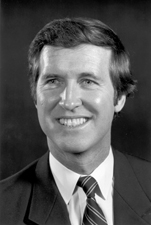

Nominee	William Cohen	Libby Mitchell
Party	Republican	Democratic
Popular vote	404,414	142,626
Percentage	73.34%	25.87%
- Cohen: 50–60% 60–70% 70–80% 80–90% >90% Mitchell: 50–60% 60–70%
U.S. senator before election
William Cohen
Republican
Elected U.S. Senator
William Cohen
Republican

The 1984 United States Senate election in Maine was held on November 7, 1984. Incumbent Republican U.S. Senator William Cohen won re-election to a second term in a landslide over Democratic state representative Elizabeth "Libby" Mitchell. Both Cohen and Mitchell were unopposed in their party primaries.

Mitchell would later serve as Speaker of the Maine House of Representatives from 1994 to 1997, and President of the Maine Senate from 2008 to 2010. She would also be the Democratic nominee for Governor of Maine in 2010, losing that election to Republican Paul LePage.

== Major candidates ==
=== Democratic ===
- Libby Mitchell, State Representative since 1974

=== Republican ===
- William Cohen, U.S. Senator since 1979 and former U.S. Representative from Maine's 2nd congressional district (1973–1979)

== Results ==
Cohen defeated Mitchell in a near-50-point landslide. Cohen carried all but four municipalities in the state, with Mitchell winning only Brighton Plantation, Eagle Lake, Isle au Haut, and the Passamaquoddy Indian Township Reservation.

General election results
Party	Candidate	Votes	%
Republican	William Cohen (incumbent)	404,414	73.34%
Democratic	Libby Mitchell	142,626	25.87%
Constitutionalist	P. Ann Stoddard	4,338	0.79%
Total votes		551,378	100.00%
Republican hold			

== See also ==
- 1984 United States Senate elections
