= Beverly Daggett =

American politician

Member of the Maine Senate from the Augusta district
- In office 1996–2004
- Preceded by: Beverly Bustin
- Succeeded by: Libby Mitchell

Personal details
- Born: Beverly Estelle Clark; September 9, 1945 Florence, South Carolina, U.S.
- Died: September 6, 2015 (aged 69) Lewiston, Maine, U.S.
- Party: Democratic
- Spouse: Tom Daggett
- Parents: Rev. John G. Clark (father); Rev. Dr. Beth P. Clark (mother)

Beverly Estelle Daggett (née Clark; September 9, 1945 – September 6, 2015) was a Maine politician. Daggett, a Democrat, represented the state capital Augusta in the Maine House of Representatives for five terms (1986–1996) before being elected to the Maine State Senate in 1996. She served in the Senate from 1996 to 2004. In 2002, she was elected the 111th President of the Maine Senate. She was the first woman to serve as Senate President.

In 1996, Daggett received a donated kidney from her mother. In 2008, it was reported that she needed another kidney and was receiving dialysis treatment. Daggett died in Lewiston on September 6, 2015. She was serving as a commissioner of Kennebec County at the time of her death.
