= Bruce S. Bryant =

American politician and boiler operator (born 1961)

Bruce Bryant

Member of the Maine Senate from the 14th district
- In office 2002–2010
- Succeeded by: John L. Patrick

Personal details
- Born: November 21, 1961 (age 64) Canton, Maine, U.S.
- Party: Democratic
- Spouse: Divorced
- Profession: Boiler operator

Bruce Samuel Bryant (born November 21, 1961) is an American politician and boiler operator. Bryant served as a Democratic State Senator from Maine's 14th District, representing part of Oxford County as well as the town of Jay in adjacent Franklin County. A resident of Dixfield, Bryant graduated from Dirigo High School and began working in the NewPage Paper Mill in Rumford in 1980.

Bryant sought election to the Maine Senate in 2002 and was elected. He won re-election in 2004, 2006 and 2008. He was unable to seek re-election in 2010 due to term limits and was replaced by union leader and state representative John L. Patrick.

He is the younger brother of fellow Democratic politician Mark Bryant, a Maine State Representative. In 2007, they discovered that Republican State Senator Paula Benoit—who was adopted as a baby—is their aunt.
