= Stephen D. Lovejoy =

American politician

- Born: Stephen D. Lovejoy
- Education: University of Southern Maine; Southern New Hampshire University
- Occupation: Representative

Stephen D. Lovejoy is an American politician from Maine. He is a former member of the Maine House of Representatives. He was a member of the Education and Cultural Affairs Committee as well as the Government Oversight Committees.

== Biography ==
Lovejoy was born in Hollis, Maine. He studied at University of Southern Maine and Southern New Hampshire University (formerly New Hampshire College). He recently served on the Downtown Portland Corporation board of directors and has served in other board positions with community groups in the past. He has also worked in banking and finance as well as economic development.

Lovejoy married Nancy Hearne and they have six grown children and ten grandchildren.
