= Alton Cianchette =

American politician

Chuck Cianchette

Member of the Maine Senate
- In office 1992–1996
- Preceded by: Jerome Emerson
- Succeeded by: Betty Lou Mitchell
- Constituency: 10th district
- In office 1973–1977
- Constituency: 23rd district

Personal details
- Born: 1930 Pittsfield, Maine, U.S.
- Died: January 18, 2000 (aged 69–70) Eastern Kentucky
- Party: Democratic
- Spouse: Helen Esty
- Relatives: Clair Cianchette (brother); Carl Cianchette (brother); Peter Cianchette (nephew)
- Profession: Construction Company Founder, Owner

Alton E. "Chuck" Cianchette (1930 – January 18, 2000) was an American businessperson and politician from Maine.

Cianchette was born in Pittsfield as the youngest of seven children. He graduated from Maine Central Institute. He died on January 18, 2000, when his single-engine 1948 Cessna crashed in rural eastern Kentucky en route from Maine to his winter home in St. Petersburg, Florida.

A Democrat from central Maine, Cianchette resided in both Pittsfield, Maine, and Palmyra, Maine, during his 4 terms in the Maine Senate. Cianchette was first elected in 1972 while residing in Pittsfield. Re-elected two years later, Cianchette did not seek public office again until 1992, when he had moved to Palmyra. He ran in 1992 as part of a bipartisan campaign he spearheaded to get more business managers elected to the Maine Legislature. After raising an unprecedented $130,000 for his 1992 campaign, Cianchette was elected once again. Cianchette and fellow Democratic state senator Donald Esty, Jr. both were seeking the Senate Presidency if the Democrats maintained control of that body. Cianchette was reelected but the Maine Republican Party took control of the body following the 1994 general election and Jeffrey Butland was elected Senate President instead.

Cianchette co-founded Cianbro Corporation in Pittsfield, Maine in 1949. Cianbro eventually became the largest construction company in the state. He also served as a trustee and philanthropist for Maine Central Institute in Pittsfield. Working through the MCI board, Cianchette often donated his own money to renovate the campus.

Cianchette was a radio operator stationed in Germany for 18 months during the Korean War.

He participated in numerous community organizations including as the President of the Pine Tree Council of the Boy Scouts of America, and as a Trustee for the Susan L. Curtis Foundation. He was awarded, along with his brother Ival R. 'Bud' Cianchette, the 1990 Business Leaders of Maine Award by the Maine Chamber of Commerce and Industry.

He also served on the President's Council of the Experimental Aircraft Association in Oshkosh, Wisconsin, and was President of the Maine Pilots Association in 1976. In 1981 the Maine Pilots Association awarded him that association's Gaddis Cup Award.

A hangar at the Beechcraft Heritage Museum in Tullahoma, Tennessee, is named after him.
