= Andre Cushing III =

American politician (born 1958/59)

Commissioner Andre Cushing III

Member of the Penobscot County Commission from the 2nd district
- Incumbent
- Assumed office August 2018
- Preceded by: Tom Davis

Member of the Maine Senate from the 10th district
- In office December 3, 2014 – December 5, 2018
- Preceded by: Stanley Gerzofsky
- Succeeded by: Stacey Guerin

Member of the Maine Senate from the 33rd district
- In office December 5, 2012 – December 3, 2014
- Preceded by: Debra Plowman
- Succeeded by: David Woodsome

Member of the Maine House of Representatives from the 39th district
- In office December 3, 2008 – December 5, 2012
- Preceded by: Brian Duprey
- Succeeded by: Brian Duprey

Personal details
- Born: 1958 or 1959 (age 67–68) Bangor, Maine
- Party: Republican
- Spouse: Gwen
- Occupation: Realtor
- Website: AndreCushing.com

Andre E. Cushing III (born 1958/59) is an American politician from Maine. Cushing is a Republican Currently he is one of three County Commissioners for Penobscot county, representing 20 communities in So. Penobscot's District 2. He served three terms as a State Senator from Maine's 10th (formerly 33rd before 2013 redistricting plan) Senate District, representing Carmel, Corinna, Corinth, Dixmont, Etna, Exeter, Hudson, Glenburn, Hampden, Kenduskeag, Levant, Newburgh, Newport, Plymouth, and Stetson Maine and his residence in Hampden.

He was first elected to the House of Representatives in 2008 and was re-elected in 2010. He was elected to the Maine Senate in 2012 and re-elected in 2014 and 2016. He served on the Hampden Town Council from 2007 through 2012 and was deputy mayor of the town from 2010 through 2012.

After the Republicans took over the Maine House of Representatives in 2010, Cushing was named the Assistant Majority Leader for the 125th Maine Legislature (2010–2012). He was chosen to serve as Assistant Majority Leader of the Maine Senate for the 127th Legislature and was re-elected to this position in the 128th Legislature.

In 2010, he was named chair of the Elections Committee and House Chair of the Select Committee on Joint Rules. In 2009, during his first term, he was appointed as the lead member of the joint Committee on Labor. In 2011, he was temporarily appointed to the Joint Standing Committee on Labor, Commerce, Research and Economic Development (this was to fill an open position).

In 2013, he was reappointed to this committee as the Senate lead and he was again reappointed in the 127th Legislature. He also was appointed to the decennial Commission on Apportionment to work on redistricting of House, Senate and County Commissioner districts. Cushing served on the Senate Rules Committee and the Senate Elections Committee, which oversaw the contested election in Senate District 25. In the 128th Legislature, he was appointed to the Joint Committees on Taxation and also Energy, Utilities and Technology. He also served on the Joint Committee on Rules. In 2014, he was appointed to the Maine Canadian Commission to interact with the Canadian provinces and in December 2016 he led the New England legislative delegation to the Republic of China (Taiwan).

He offered legislation in 2011 which led to three study commissions, two of which he co-chaired: The Blue Ribbon Panel on Affordable Housing and the Study Committee on regulatory takings, which reviewed the relationship between government laws and rules and their impact on property owners. A report was issued which resulted in a new bill to protect the value of property from diminution as the result of new state enacted laws. After a contentious debate with the environmental lobby, it passed the House but died in the Maine Senate. He also sponsored LD 1571, a comprehensive reform of Maine's Workers Compensation system which led to a directive from the Joint Committee on Labor, Commerce, Research & Economic Development (LCRED) to have the executive director empanel a working group to study and report back suggested changes based upon their discussions of the points proposed by the bill. This report was due by mid-February 2012. As a result of this work by the 13 members of the panel, a new bill was crafted and Rep. Cushing asked to have it replace LD 1571. This legislation was passed and made changes which helped see workers comp rates reduced and service for injured workers adjusted to better serve their needs.

In 2013, Cushing introduced legislation to allow for the collaborative practice between doctors and pharmacists to better manage patient care, he also sponsored a resolve to allow for a citizen vote on a constitutional amendment to allow for the public election of three constitutional officers (Attorney General, Secretary of State and State Treasurer), he resubmitted this legislation in the 127th and the 128th sessions. He also was the lead sponsor (in the 126th Legislature) on a bill to extend a trial program which allowed for the exemption from tax on aircraft parts which spurred a number of developments in aviation services in Maine. During the 127th Legislature he sponsored legislation on behalf of the governor which established a prescription monitoring program for opioids that requires all providers to enter information into a centralized database and also limits the amount and length of prescription for these medications. The 128th Legislature commissioned the Task Force to Address the Opioid Crisis in the State. He was appointed as senate chair and oversaw the work of a panel including representatives from the law enforcement, treatment and private sector. Here is a link to their report https://www.maine.gov/legis/opla/OpioidTaskForce.htm

In February, 2018, he announced that he would not be seeking re-election to the state senate in the fall elections, in order to devote more time to family and business matters.

In the fall of 2018 he was appointed by Governor LePage to fill the remaining term of Penobscot County Commissioner Tom Davis who died in August 2018. He was elected in November to complete the remaining two years.

== Controversies ==
In 2016, Cushing was sued by his sister over allegations that he misappropriated more than $1 million from family businesses. In 2017, the Maine Ethics Commission fined his campaign and political action committee a combined $9,000 for campaign finance reporting violations. In 2023, Cushing faced calls for resignation after voting to award a $48,000 county lobbying contract to a former business associate without recusing himself. The contract was subsequently terminated. In September 2026, the Bangor Daily News reported that Cushing and fellow Commissioner David Marshall had charged more than $8,000 in combined travel, dining, and other expenses to county credit cards in 2025 amid a multimillion-dollar county budget shortfall.

== Personal ==
Cushing was born in 1958 or 1959. Cushing attended Bangor-area primary schools, graduated from John Bapst High School in 1977 and then attended the University of Maine.

He has been active with a variety of civic and community organizations over the years including: Bangor Jaycees, Bangor Rotary, Hampden Kiwanis, EMMC Children's Miracle Network Board – President, Phillips-Strickland House – Corporator, Eastern Maine Community College Foundation, Avalon Village, board of directors, Black Bear United Football Club, President, Hampden Business Association, Vice Chair, Citizens for Quality Education. His legislative service provided him an opportunity to serve on a national level as a board member for the National Conference of State Legislators (NCSL) and also served on the board of directors of the American Legislative Exchange Council.

He has over forty years experience as a small business owner and currently is a realtor and home builder.
