= Edward Mazurek =

American politician (1938–2017)

Member of the Maine Senate from the 22nd district
- In office December 5, 2012 – December 3, 2014
- Preceded by: Chris Rector
- Succeeded by: David Miramant

Personal details
- Born: December 21, 1938 Stamford, Connecticut
- Died: October 4, 2017 (aged 78)
- Party: Democratic
- Spouse: Maryellen Mazurek
- Profession: schoolteacher

Edward 'Coach' J. Mazurek (December 21, 1938 – October 4, 2017) was an American schoolteacher and politician from Maine. Mazurek served as a Democratic State Senator from Maine's 22nd District, representing much of Knox County, including Thomaston and his residence in Rockland.

== Sports ==
Mazurek was born and raised in Stamford, Connecticut. At the age of 13, Mazurek won the 1951 Little League World Series with his fellow Stamford residents over Austin, Texas. Mazurek attended Xavier University in Cincinnati, Ohio, where he played with the Musketeers football team and earned a Bachelor of Business Administration. A defensive tackle, Mazurek was drafted by three teams in 1960: the Boston Patriots in the American Football League (AFL), the Montreal Alouettes of the Canadian Football League (CFL) and the Chicago Cardinals of the National Football League (NFL). He signed with Chicago, which shortly thereafter moved and became the St. Louis Cardinals. He was traded midseason to the New York Giants and retired following the season never having taken the field.

== Education ==
Mazurek returned to school and earned a Master's in Education from Fairfield University in 1968 so that he could coach and teach. His first job was at Central Catholic High School, where he coached 4 different sports. He later taught in Barrington, Rhode Island and at Triton Regional High School in Newbury, Massachusetts before being hired at Rockland District High School in 1975. He taught and coached football in Rockland for 35 years until he retired in 2010.

== Politics ==
He was first elected to office in November 2001, when he won a seat on the Rockland City Council as the top vote getter. He served a single 3-year term on the council and was twice elected Mayor of Rockland, a largely ceremonial title. He was elected to the Maine House of Representatives in 2004 and was unable to run for re-election in 2012 due to term-limits. In 2012, he was elected to the Maine Senate, replacing Republican Chris Rector. In February 2014, Mazurek announced he would not seek re-election. Mazurek died at the age of 78 on October 4, 2017.
