= Mary E. Small =

American politician (born 1954)

Mary E. Small (born September 12, 1954) is an American politician from Maine. A Republican, Small served in the Maine House of Representatives from 1979 to 1994 and the Maine Senate from 1994 to 2002. From 2000 to 2002, Senator Small served as the Republican Floor Leader. Small was unable to seek re-election in 2002 due to term limits. Small represented Bath, Maine and Sagadahoc County. In July 2020, she was described as an ally of U.S. Senator Susan Collins when she filed a legal challenge against conservative independent Max Linn in an attempt to keep him off of the November Senate ballot. The challenge was ultimately unsuccessful, though Collins won re-election nonetheless.

Small graduated from the University of Southern Maine with a B.A. in political science in 1976.

Maine House of Representatives
Preceded by Kathleen Watson	Member of the Maine House of Representatives from the 90th district 1978–1984	Succeeded by Daniel B. Hickey
Preceded by James W. Reeves	Member of the Maine House of Representatives from the 75th district 1984–1994	Succeeded by Roy I. Nickerson
Maine Senate
Preceded by Beverly Bustin	Member of the Maine Senate from the 19th district 1994–2002	Succeeded by Arthur Mayo
