= Linda Valentino =

American politician (born 1956)

Member of the Maine Senate from the 5th district
- Incumbent
- Assumed office 2012
- Preceded by: Barry Hobbins

Personal details
- Born: 1956 (age 69–70) Maine
- Party: Democratic
- Spouse: Curtis Scamman

Linda M. Valentino (born 1956) is an American politician from Maine. Valentino is a Democratic State Senator from Maine's 5th District, representing part of York County, including her residence of Saco. She was first elected to the Maine House of Representatives in 2004 and re-elected in 2006, 2008 and 2010. Unable to run for re-election to the Maine House in 2012 due to term limits, Valentino ran in the Democratic primary for the open District 5 State Senate seat to replace fellow Democrat Barry Hobbins. Valentino won the nomination by beating fellow State Representative Donald Pilon. Valentino easily won the general election, defeating Timothy Sevigny. In December 2012, Valentino was named Chair of the Judiciary Committee.

== Personal ==
Valentino was born in 1956 in Maine. She is married to Curtis Scamman and has three children. She first entered politics in 1979 when she was elected to the Saco City Council. She served on the Council until 1985, including a stint as deputy mayor. She graduated from the University of Southern Maine in 1976 with an Associate of Arts in Business Administration and a Bachelor of Arts from USM in 2004.
