= Terry Morrison (politician) =

American politician

Terry K. Morrison

Member of the Maine House of Representatives from the 122nd district
- In office December 3, 2008 – December 2016
- Preceded by: Larry Bliss
- Succeeded by: Lois Reckitt

Personal details
- Born: Boothbay Harbor, Maine, U.S.
- Party: Democratic
- Website: terrymorrison.org

Terry K. Morrison is an American politician from the state of Maine. A Democrat, he served in the Maine House of Representatives from 2008 to 2016, representing the 122nd district which is centered on his hometown of South Portland.

Born and raised in Boothbay Harbor, Maine, Morrison moved to Portland as a teenager and graduated from Portland High School. He then attended Husson College in Bangor, majoring in business. He has since worked as a restaurant manager in South Portland.

Morrison has long been active in Maine politics. He served as vice chairman of the Cumberland County Democratic Committee and has been active in EqualityMaine. He first ran for public office in 2008, seeking to succeed the term-limited Larry Bliss in the 122nd House district. Morrison did not attract any primary opponents and faced Brian Durham, a Republican, in the general election. He won by 67 percent to 33 percent and took office in December 2008. He was reelected in 2010, 2012 and 2014. Term limits prevented him from seeking a fifth term in 2016.

Morrison is openly gay.
