= Gerald Davis (politician) =

American politician (1936–2024)

Member of the Maine Senate from the 11th district
- In office 2008–2010
- Preceded by: Karl Turner
- Succeeded by: Richard G. Woodbury

Personal details
- Born: January 25, 1936 Bangor, Maine, U.S.
- Died: February 12, 2024 (aged 88)
- Party: Republican
- Spouse: Sandra Davis (m. 1964)
- Children: 3
- Education: Bates College (BA); University of Southern Maine (MA)
- Profession: Teacher

Gerald M. Davis (January 25, 1936 – February 12, 2024) was an American politician from Maine.

== Career ==
Davis, a Republican from Falmouth, represented District 11 in the Maine Senate from 2008 to 2010. He was defeated for re-election in 2010 by unenrolled (independent) Richard G. Woodbury of Yarmouth. Davis' Senate district covered part of Cumberland County, specifically Chebeague Island, Cumberland, Falmouth, Gray, Long Island, North Yarmouth and Yarmouth. He served in the Maine House of Representatives from 1996 to 2006. He also served on the Falmouth School Board.

He taught history at Portland High School and served as a Peace Corps volunteer.

A Roman Catholic, Davis opposed redefining marriage to include same sex marriage.

Davis dies on February 12, 2024, at the age of 88.

== Education ==
Davis earned a B.A. from Bates College and an MA in history and education from the University of Southern Maine.
