= Mark Bryant (politician) =

American politician

- Born: September 29, 1956
- Occupation: politician

Mark Edward Bryant (born September 29, 1956) is an American politician.

Born in Rumford, Maine, Bryant received his associate degree in computer science from Andover College in 1983. He lives in Windham, Maine. Bryant worked as a toll collector for the Maine Turnpike Authority and as a papermaker for Sappi Fine Paper Company. Bryant is involved with the Maine Democratic Party. From 2004 to 2013 and then from 2015 to the present time, Bryant served in the Maine House of Representatives.

He is the elder brother of fellow Democratic politician Bruce Bryant, who served as a Maine state senator. In 2007, they discovered that Republican State Senator Paula Benoit – who was adopted as a baby – is their aunt.
