= Raynold Theriault =

American politician

Raynold Theriault Sr. (May 12, 1936 – June 5, 2015) was an American politician from Maine. Theriault served six terms in the Maine Legislature. He was first elected as a Democrat to the Maine House of Representatives in November 1980, where he spent three terms. In 1986, Theriault was elected to the Maine Senate as a Democrat. Theriault joined the Maine Republican Party on December 31, 1991. He did not seek re-election in 1992. He also served terms on the SAD 27 School Board of Directors and the Fort Kent Town Council.

He graduated from the Madawaska Training School (presently University of Maine Fort Kent) where he majored in education and earned a bachelor's degree in business management from Ricker College. He graduated from Maine Military Academy as well as attending a number of military schools including the U.S. Army Command and General Staff College in Leavenworth Kansas.
