= Sara Stevens =

American politician (born 1974)

Member of the Maine House of Representatives
- In office 2008–2012
- Succeeded by: Victoria Kornfield

Personal details
- Born: 1974 (age 51–52)
- Party: Democrat

Sara R. Stevens (born 1974) is an American politician from Maine. A member of the Democratic Party, Stevens served as a member of the Maine House of Representatives, representing part of Bangor from 2008 to 2012. Stevens withdrew in June 2012 following an uncontested primary. She was replaced by Victoria Kornfield, who was then elected to replace Stevens in November.

== Education ==
Stevens attended Syracuse University before graduating with a B.A. from the University of Maine in 1996. In 1999, Stevens graduated with an MS in Human Development from the University of Maine.
