= Jill Goldthwait =

American politician

Member of the Maine Senate from the 5th district
- In office December 1994 – December 2002
- Preceded by: Stephen Hall
- Succeeded by: Dennis Damon

Personal details
- Born: New Jersey
- Party: Unenrolled
- Profession: Director of Government Relations, Jackson Laboratory

Jill Goldthwait is an American politician from Maine. Goldthwait grew up in New Jersey and obtained a degree in nursing in California. She served a stint as a Peace Corps volunteer in Tonga. She moved to Maine in 1978 and settled in Bar Harbor, Maine on Mount Desert Island. She worked as an emergency department nurse at Mount Desert Island Hospital and served on the Bar Harbor Town Council for 9 years prior to running for Maine State Senate. An unenrolled (independent), she won 4 terms (1994-2002) in the State Senate before being unable to run for re-election due to term-limits. She then took a job with Jackson Laboratory in Bar Harbor, which later turned into a permanent position as Director of Government Relations. In 2005, Goldthwait was named by Governor John Baldacci to the state's newly created Creative Economy Council.
