= Paula Benoit =

American politician

Member of the Maine Senate from the 19th district
- In office 2006–2008
- Preceded by: Arthur Mayo
- Succeeded by: Seth Goodall

Personal details
- Born: March 12, 1955 (age 71)
- Party: Republican
- Spouse: Joseph Octave "Joe" Benoit (m. 1975; died 2022)

Paula Anne Benoit (born March 12, 1955) is an American politician from Maine. Benoit served as a Republican State Senator from Maine's 19th District, representing part of Sagadahoc County, including the population centers of Bath and Topsham from 2006 to 2008.

In 2006, she challenged incumbent State Senator Arthur Mayo III. Mayo had been a registered Republican, but switched parties shortly after his reelection in 2004. After a spirited campaign, Benoit beat Mayo. She was the only Republican to beat an incumbent Senate Democrat in 2006.

As a State Senator, Benoit helped lead the charge for changing Maine's adoption law to allow adoptees to see their original birth certificates. In most states, original birth certificates are sealed. After this law went into effect Benoit, herself an adoptee, viewed her original birth certificate and discovered two of her colleagues in the legislature – State Senator Bruce Bryant and State Representative Mark Bryant – were her nephews.

In 2008, Goodall defeated Benoit for re-election by 162 votes. She outperformed John McCain's U.S. presidential campaign in her district, with Senator McCain losing District 19 by 3,492 votes to U.S. Senator Barack Obama. In 2013, Goodall resigned after his appointment to a federal post and Benoit announced she would seek the Republican nomination for the special election. She was defeated by Democrat Eloise Vitelli in the August election.

In 2011, Benoit wrote a children's book, Baxter in the Blaine House, about the Jack Russell Terrier mix of Maine Gov. Paul LePage.
