= Mary Cathcart =

American politician from Maine

Member of the Maine Senate from the 32nd district
- In office 1996–2004
- Succeeded by: Elizabeth Schneider

Personal details
- Born: August 28, 1942 (age 83) Greenwood, Mississippi
- Party: Democratic

Mary R. Cathcart (born August 28, 1942) is an American politician from Maine. Cathcart served as a Democratic State Senator from Maine's 32nd District, representing part of Penobscot County, including the population centers of Orono and Lincoln. She was first elected to the Maine State Senate in 1996 after serving from 1988 to 1994 in the Maine House of Representatives. She was term-limited from the State Senate in 2004.

She was a candidate for Maine's 2nd congressional district in 1994, but was defeated by John Baldacci.

== Personal ==
Cathcart earned a B.A. from Rhodes College in 1963 and completed graduate coursework at Vanderbilt University.
