= Kevin Raye =

American politician

President of the Maine Senate
- In office December 1, 2010 – December 5, 2012
- Preceded by: Libby Mitchell
- Succeeded by: Justin Alfond

Minority Leader of the Maine Senate
- In office December 3, 2008 – December 1, 2010
- Preceded by: Carol Weston
- Succeeded by: Barry Hobbins

Member of the Maine Senate from the 29th district
- In office December 1, 2004 – December 5, 2012
- Preceded by: Carolyn Gilman
- Succeeded by: David Burns

Personal details
- Born: February 7, 1961 (age 65) Eastport, Maine, U.S.
- Party: Republican
- Spouse: Karen Raye
- Education: Bates College
- Profession: Small Business Owner

Kevin L. Raye (born February 7, 1961) is an American politician. Raye is a member of the Republican Party and served as a member of the Maine Senate, representing the 29th district in northeastern Washington County from December 2004 to December 2012. From December 2010 to December 2012, Raye served as President of the Maine Senate, and as such, was next in line to the governorship of Maine.

== Early life, education, and early career ==
Raye was born February 7, 1961, in Eastport, Maine. He is one of eight sons of Harry Raye, an electrician and a veteran of World War II, and Frances Morrison Raye, a teacher. He graduated from Shead Memorial High School in Eastport and earned a degree in political science from Bates College in Lewiston.

Along with his wife Karen, he owns and operates Raye's Mustard Mill, which has been run by members of the Raye family since 1900. He spent seventeen years working for former U.S. Representative and former U.S. Senator Olympia Snowe. He served as her chief of staff for six years.

== Maine legislature ==
Raye represented Maine Senate District 29. District 29 includes a portion of Hancock County and Washington County.

=== Elections ===
Raye won re-election to the 29th District Seat in 2010, defeating Democrat F. James Whalen. On November 4, 2008, Raye won re-election by defeating Karen Johnson and Dana Kadey.

=== Committee assignments ===
- Select Committee on Joint Rules
- Senatorial Vote Committee
- Senate Rules Committee
- Legislative Council

== Congressional campaigns ==
=== 2002 ===
Michaud, then a State Senator, narrowly defeated Republican Raye in the race to replace incumbent Democrat John Baldacci, who ran for Governor of Maine. In the primary, Raye defeated State Representative Stavros Mendros, State Representative Dick Campbell, and Tim Woodcock. The general election garnered considerable publicity because the Democratic candidate opposed abortion, while the Republican supported abortion rights. Michaud then became the only freshman Democratic member of Congress to vote for the 2003 ban on intact dilation and extraction (IDX), often called partial-birth abortion.

=== 2012 ===
Raye, who was unable to run for re-election the Maine Senate due to term-limits, considered a rematch against incumbent Democrat Mike Michaud in the 2012 congressional elections as early as the middle of 2011. Upon the decision of Olympia Snowe to not seek re-election to the United States Senate, Raye briefly considered running for her seat, but ultimately decided to enter the House primary, which Raye won on June 12, 2012, to become the nominee.

Raye received 41.8% of the vote and lost to incumbent Michaud.

=== 2014 ===
After Rep. Michaud announced he was running for Governor of Maine in the 2014 election, Raye announced he would again seek to win Michaud's seat. However, he lost the Republican primary to former Maine State Treasurer Bruce Poliquin.

== Personal life ==
Raye and his family resides in Perry, Maine. Karen Howard Raye, his wife, is a member of the Perry Board of Selectmen. He is a member, trustee and Church Council Chairman of the North Perry United Methodist Church.
