= Arthur Mayo (politician) =

American businessperson and politician (1936–2015)

Member of the Maine Senate from the 19th district
- In office December 4, 2002 – December 6, 2006
- Preceded by: Mary Small
- Succeeded by: Paula Benoit

Member of the Maine House of Representatives from the 54th district
- In office December 7, 1994 – December 4, 2002
- Preceded by: Conrad Heeschen
- Succeeded by: Thomas R. Watson

Personal details
- Born: May 10, 1936 Bath, Maine
- Died: November 3, 2015 (aged 79)
- Party: Republican (before 2004); Democratic (2004–2015)

Arthur Farley Mayo III (May 10, 1936 – November 3, 2015) was an American businessman and politician from Maine.

== Political career ==
Mayo served as a Democratic State Senator from Maine's 19th District, representing part of Sagadahoc County, including the population centers of Bath and Topsham from 2002 to 2006. In 2006, Paula Benoit defeated Mayo for re-election.

Mayo served on the Bath School Board from 1974 to 1978. He served four terms (1994 to 2002) in the Maine House of Representatives. On December 7. 2004, Mayo switched from the Republican Party to the Democratic Party.

== Personal life ==
Mayo was born and raised in Bath, Maine. In 1958, Mayo graduated from the University of Maine. A year later in 1959, he graduated from Cincinnati College of Mortuary Science. In 1973, Mayo graduated with a Master's in Education from the University of Southern Maine. Mayo owned a funeral home. Mayo died of cancer on November 3, 2015.
