= Larry Bliss =

American educator and politician

Lawrence S. Bliss

Member of the Maine Senate from the 7th district
- In office December 3, 2008 – April 15, 2011
- Preceded by: Lynn Bromley
- Succeeded by: Cynthia Dill

Member of the Maine House of Representatives from the 122nd district
- In office December 2000 – December 2008
- Preceded by: Peter Cianchette
- Succeeded by: Terry Morrison

Personal details
- Born: December 29, 1946 (age 79)
- Party: Democratic
- Occupation: Educator
- Website: lawrencebliss.info

Lawrence Steven Bliss (born December 29, 1946) is an American educator and former politician from the state of Maine. A Democrat, he served in the Maine House of Representatives (2000–2008) and the Maine Senate (2008–2011). He resigned as a senator on April 15, 2011 after accepting a position as an administrator at California State University, East Bay, and leaving the state of Maine.

== Biography ==
Bliss studied at multiple campuses of the University of California, where he earned both bachelor's and master's degrees. He taught at the middle school and high school levels before moving to university administration. He worked at California State University, Sacramento and San Francisco State University before moving to Maine. He was formerly employed as the Director of Career Services and Professional Life Development at the University of Southern Maine.

Bliss was first elected to the Maine House of Representatives in November 2000, winning 58% of the general election vote in South Portland's 24th district. Re-elected in 2002, his district was renumbered the 122nd in time for the 2004 election, when he secured re-election with 67% of the vote. He won by a similar margin in 2006.

Term limits prevented him from seeking a fifth House term in 2008. Instead, he was a candidate for the Maine Senate in the 7th district, which includes Cape Elizabeth, South Portland and part of Scarborough. The incumbent, Sen. Lynn Bromley, was also forced out by term limits. In the primary election on June 10, 2008, Bliss faced former state representative Ed Kelleher and defeated him by 63% to 37% of the vote. He faced Republican John F. Ridge in the November general election and won. He ran for re-election in 2010, winning narrowly in a race that went to a recount. His original lead of 64 votes was widened to 75 votes in the recount: Bliss polled 9,172 to his Republican opponent's 9,097.

Bliss resigned his Senate Seat to accept a position in university administration at California State University, East Bay. As Director of Academic Advising and Career Education, he grew his department from a staff of seven to a staff of 21 when he retired at the end of 2020.

Bliss is openly gay and has three children. He and his partner have been together since 1995. They were married in 2008, during that short time when marriage was legal in California. During a vacation trip, the couple married at the Ventura County Courthouse, with their young children serving as their witnesses. Bliss has long been involved with charitable and community organizations, including the AIDS Project, the Equity Institute of Maine, the South Portland Citizens for Justice, and the Maine Lesbian/Gay Political Alliance (now known as EqualityMaine). He also served as Treasurer of the Cumberland County Democratic Committee.

The couple currently reside in their home in the Hayward hills.
