= Susan Longley =

American politician and lawyer

Susan Walsh Longley

Judge of the Waldo County Probate Court
- In office January 1, 2005 – June 1, 2019

Member of the Maine Senate from the 11th district
- In office December 7, 1994 – December 4, 2002
- Preceded by: Robert Gould - R
- Succeeded by: Carol Weston - R

Personal details
- Born: December 15, 1955 (age 70) Lewiston, Maine, U.S.
- Party: Democratic
- Education: Mount Holyoke College (BA); Columbus School of Law, Institute of Law and Public Policy (JD); University of Maine (MA)

Susan Walsh Longley (born December 15, 1955) is an American policy maker, lawyer, and jurist from Maine. A Democrat, Longley served in the Maine Senate from 1994 to 2002, as the first ever Democrat and woman elected and re-elected in then strongly Republican Waldo County. In 2002, she sought the Democratic Party's nomination for Maine's 2nd congressional district, where she sought to replace John Baldacci. She closely lost in the June primary to Senate President Mike Michaud. In 2004, Longley unseated incumbent Republican Waldo County Judge of Probate Randy Mailloux. She was re-elected in 2008, 2012 and 2016. She retired in 2019.

== Personal & legal career ==
Longley, who was born in Lewiston, Maine and grew up near Bates College, is the daughter of former independent Governor James B. Longley. The Longley family is Irish, with generations attending St. Patrick's School in Lewiston. She graduated from Lewiston High School in 1974. She graduated from Mount Holyoke College (B.A., 1978), the Columbus School of Law (Institute of Law and Public Policy) (J.D., 1988) and the University of Maine, (Political) History (M.A., 1992). Upon her return to Maine in 1988, she was a law clerk for judges in Maine's Superior Court system. In addition to her having served as State Senator and Judge of Probate for Waldo County, Longley, a long-time resident of Liberty, Maine and now Woolwich, Maine, also has taught conservation and environment law, history and policy courses at Unity College for several (12) years and, most recently, at the University of Maine.. Now retired, Longley does continue as a licensed Maine Guide.
