= Betty Lou Mitchell =

American politician (born 1937)

Member of the Maine Senate from the 10th district
- In office 1996–2004
- Preceded by: Alton Cianchette
- Succeeded by: Debra Plowman

Personal details
- Born: August 14, 1937 (age 88) Hartford, Connecticut
- Party: Republican
- Spouse: Don David

Betty Lou Mitchell (born August 14, 1937) is an American politician from Maine. A Republican, Mitchell served in the Maine Senate from 1996 to 2004, representing western Penobscot County, including her residence of Etna. Mitchell earned a diploma from Ellsworth High School in 1955.
