= Dana Hanley =

American politician, attorney and jurist

Member of the Maine Senate from the Oxford County district
- In office 1992–1996

Personal details
- Born: Paris, Maine
- Party: Republican
- Profession: Attorney
- Website: Hanley & Associates

Dana Hanley is an American politician, attorney and jurist from Maine. He has served as the Judge Probate of Oxford County, Maine since January 1, 1997. He served in the Maine House of Representatives from 1986 to 1992 and the Maine Senate from 1992 to 1996. He lives in Paris, Maine.

== Personal ==
Hanley first ran in 1986 for State Representative as a newcomer to politics. Originally from Paris, Maine, he graduated from Oxford Hills Comprehensive High School and Colby College. Prior to running, Hanley had been chair of the Paris Republican Committee for a year and a half.
