= James Hamper =

American politician and carpenter

Member of the Maine Senate
- In office December 5, 2012 – December 2, 2020
- Preceded by: David Hastings
- Succeeded by: Rick Bennett
- Constituency: 13th district (2012-2014); 19th district (2014–2020)

Member of the Maine House of Representatives from the 100th district
- In office 2004–2012
- Succeeded by: Roger A. Jackson

Personal details
- Born: June 15, 1955 (age 71) Dayton, Ohio
- Party: Republican
- Spouse: Lynn Hamper
- Profession: Carpenter

James Michael Hamper (born June 15, 1955) is an American politician and carpenter from Maine. Hamper is a Republican State Senator from Maine's 19th District, representing parts of Cumberland and Oxford Counties, including his residence of Oxford. Hamper earned a A.A. from the University of Maine at Augusta in 2001. He was first elected to the Maine House of Representatives in 2004 and was unable to run for re-election in 2012 due to term-limits. From 2010 to 2012, Hamper served as the House chairman of the Legislature's Environment and Natural Resources Committee and a member of the Energy, Utilities and Technology Committee. In 2012, he was elected to the Maine Senate, replacing fellow Republican David Hastings.

Hamper is a practicing carpenter in Otisfield, Maine and a member of the Oxford Advent Christian Church, an evangelical church in Oxford.
