= Karl Turner (American politician) =

American politician and businessperson

Member of the Maine Senate from the 11th district
- In office 2000–2008
- Preceded by: Jeffrey Butland
- Succeeded by: Gerald Davis

Personal details
- Born: Karl William Turner; March 23, 1942 Eastport, Maine, U.S.
- Died: December 27, 2025 (aged 83)
- Party: Republican

Karl William Turner (March 23, 1942 – December 27, 2025) was an American politician and businessperson from Maine. Turner served as a Republican State Senator from Maine's 11th District, representing part of Cumberland County, including the population centers of Falmouth and his residence in Cumberland. He served from 2000 to 2008, when he was replaced by fellow Republican Gerald Davis.

Turner served on the town council of Falmouth, Maine from 1985 to 1991. On August 8, 2011, Turner was appointed as trustee of the University of Maine System.

== Personal ==
Turner was born on March 23, 1942, in Eastport, Maine. He graduated from the University of Maine with a Bachelor of Science in mechanical engineering in 1965.
