= Seth Goodall =

American politician

Member of the Maine Senate from the 19th district
- In office December 2008 – July 9, 2013
- Preceded by: Paula Benoit
- Succeeded by: Eloise Vitelli

Personal details
- Born: Seth A. Goodall Richmond, Maine, U.S.
- Party: Democratic
- Spouse: LeAnn Greenleaf
- Education: University of Connecticut (BS, MS); University of Maine School of Law (JD)
- Profession: Lawyer

Seth A. Goodall is an American politician and lawyer. Goodall served as a Democratic State Senator from Maine's 19th District, representing part of Sagadahoc County, including the population centers of Bath and Topsham from December 2008 until his resignation on July 9, 2013. In December 2012, Goodall was named the Majority Leader of the Maine Senate. On June 4, 2013, Goodall announced he would resign his seat in the Senate at the end of the 2013 legislative session in order to work for the Small Business Administration as a regional coordinator. He officially resigned upon the adjournment of the 2013 legislative session on July 9.

== Personal ==
Seth Goodall was born in Richmond, Maine. He is married to LeAnn Greenleaf. He earned a B.S. and M.S. from the College of Agriculture and Natural Resources at the University of Connecticut and a J.D. from the University of Maine School of Law in 2005.

== Professional experience ==
Seth Goodall has worked as an attorney at McCloskey, Mina, Cunniff and Dilworth, served as Legal Counsel to President of the Maine Senate Beth Edmonds from 2006 to 2008 and co-founded Goodall Landscaping

== Politics ==
He was first elected to the Maine State Senate in 2008 after serving from 2007 to 2008 as selectman in his hometown of Richmond. Goodall graduated from the College of Agriculture and Natural Resources at the University of Connecticut. He also graduated from the University of Maine School of Law in 2005. As of 2010, he was the youngest member of the Maine Senate. He is co-chair of the Maine Economic Growth Council. A practicing lawyer, he is part of the law firm Dyer, Goodall & Denison, P.A. in Augusta.

=== Political experience ===
Seth Goodall has had the following political experience:

- Senator, Maine State Senate, 2008–present
- Chair, Richmond Selectboard, 2007
- Volunteer, Governor Baldacci's Re-election Campaign, 2006
- Member, Land Use Ordinance Review Board
- Member, Richmond Conservation Committee
- Member, Richmond Economic Community Development Board
- Member, School Regionalization Planning Committee
