= Hanover, Maine =

Town in Maine, United States

- Town
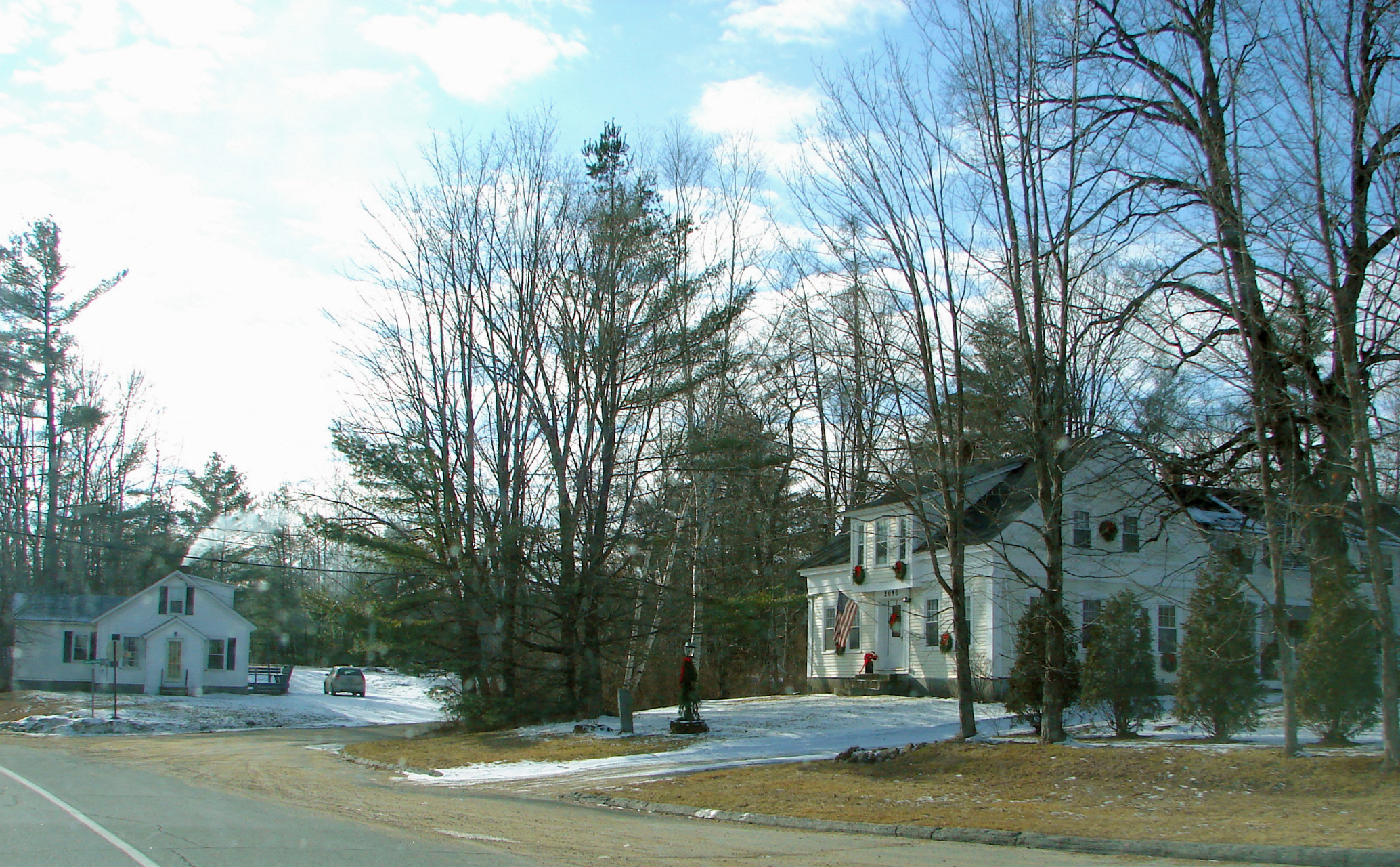
- Street scene in Hanover

- Location within Maine Location within the United States
- Coordinates: 44°29′48″N 70°44′28″W
- Country: United States
- State: Maine
- County: Oxford
- Incorporated: 1843
- Named for: House of Hanover

Area
  - Total: 7.56 sq mi (19.58 km^{2})
  - Land: 7.04 sq mi (18.23 km^{2})
  - Water: 0.52 sq mi (1.35 km^{2})
- Elevation: 1,063 ft (324 m)

Population (2020)
  - Total: 286
  - Density: 41/sq mi (15.7/km^{2})
- Time zone: UTC-5 (Eastern (EST))
  - Summer (DST): UTC-4 (EDT)
- ZIP Code: 04237
- Area code: 207
- FIPS code: 23-31110
- GNIS feature ID: 582510
- Website: hanoverme.org

Hanover is a town in Oxford County, Maine, United States. The population was 286 at the 2020 census. The town is a popular vacation and recreation area.

== History ==
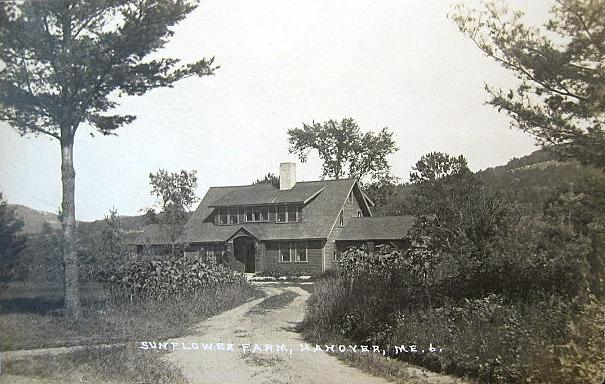
Sunflower Farm in c. 1915

The area was first settled in 1774 by Nathaniel Segar from Newton, Massachusetts. Phineas Howard from Temple, New Hampshire purchased from Massachusetts in 1792 the unoccupied land in the township, including Howard Pond. The community became known as Howard's Gore. Combined with a portion of Bethel separated by the Androscoggin River, it then became Hanover, named by its German settlers for the House of Hanover. It was incorporated on February 14, 1843.

Endowed with fine loam soil, farming became an early business. Indeed, Hanover was known for having some of the best intervale farms in the state. A variety of crops were grown, the chief being hay. The outlet of Howard Pond provided water power for industry. At Hanover Village, 12 mills were established. They produced flour, woolens, furniture, short and long lumber, sash, blinds and doors, dowels and rakes. Other goods included leather, boots and shoes. By the early 1950s, however, the last mills had declined and closed. More recently, Hanover has become a site for both year-round homes and vacation properties.

== Geography ==
According to the United States Census Bureau, the town has a total area of 7.56 square miles (19.58 km^{2}), of which 7.04 square miles (18.23 km^{2}) is land and 0.52 square miles (1.35 km^{2}) is water. Hanover is bounded by the Androscoggin River on the south and lies just southwest of Rumford on U.S. Route 2 and Maine State Route 5.

== Demographics ==
Historical population
Census	Pop.	Note	%±
1850	266		—
1860	257		−3.4%
1870	188		−26.8%
1880	203		8.0%
1890	212		4.4%
1900	214		0.9%
1910	196		−8.4%
1920	165		−15.8%
1930	170		3.0%
1940	178		4.7%
1950	211		18.5%
1960	240		13.7%
1970	275		14.6%
1980	256		−6.9%
1990	272		6.3%
2000	251		−7.7%
2010	238		−5.2%
2020	286		20.2%
U.S. Decennial Census

=== 2010 census ===
As of the census of 2010, there were 238 people, 116 households, and 63 families living in the town. The population density was 33.8 inhabitants per square mile (13.1/km^{2}). There were 235 housing units at an average density of 33.4 per square mile (12.9/km^{2}). The racial makeup of the town was 96.6% White, 1.3% Native American, 0.4% Asian, 0.4% from other races, and 1.3% from two or more races. Hispanic or Latino of any race were 1.7% of the population.

There were 116 households, of which 14.7% had children under the age of 18 living with them, 45.7% were married couples living together, 7.8% had a female householder with no husband present, 0.9% had a male householder with no wife present, and 45.7% were non-families. 34.5% of all households were made up of individuals, and 13.8% had someone living alone who was 65 years of age or older. The average household size was 2.05 and the average family size was 2.63.

The median age in the town was 50 years. 12.6% of residents were under the age of 18; 8.9% were between the ages of 18 and 24; 18.5% were from 25 to 44; 38.2% were from 45 to 64; and 21.8% were 65 years of age or older. The gender makeup of the town was 51.7% male and 48.3% female.

=== 2000 census ===
As of the census of 2000, there were 251 people, 106 households, and 76 families living in the town. The population density was 35.7 inhabitants per square mile (13.8/km^{2}). There were 207 housing units at an average density of 29.4 per square mile (11.4/km^{2}). The racial makeup of the town was 99.60% White and 0.40% Native American.

There were 106 households, out of which 32.1% had children under the age of 18 living with them, 65.1% were married couples living together, 6.6% had a female householder with no husband present, and 27.4% were non-families. 25.5% of all households were made up of individuals, and 11.3% had someone living alone who was 65 years of age or older. The average household size was 2.37 and the average family size was 2.82.

In the town, the population was spread out, with 25.1% under the age of 18, 3.2% from 18 to 24, 27.5% from 25 to 44, 28.7% from 45 to 64, and 15.5% who were 65 years of age or older. The median age was 41 years. For every 100 females, there were 107.4 males. For every 100 females age 18 and over, there were 95.8 males.

The median income for a household in the town was $35,000, and the median income for a family was $50,938. Males had a median income of $31,250 versus $24,167 for females. The per capita income for the town was $21,458. About 5.5% of families and 9.2% of the population were below the poverty line, including 6.3% of those under the age of eighteen and 15.4% of those 65 or over.
