= Scott Cowger =

American politician

Scott W. Cowger (born December 3, 1959) is an American politician, innkeeper, and engineer from Maine. A Democrat from Hallowell, Maine, Cowger spent 10 years in the Maine Legislature (1996-2006). Cowger was first elected to the Maine House of Representatives in 1996. Re-elected in 1998, 2000 and 2002, Cowger was unable to seek re-election in 2004 due to term-limits. Instead, Cowger successfully sought District 21 in the Maine Senate. He did not seek re-election in 2006.

Cowger was well known and respected for his leadership in environmental issues, and for working across party lines in crafting solutions in various legislative committees. In his first term, he served on the Joint Standing Committee on Natural Resources. In his second term, he became the ranking House member on Natural Resources, served on the Joint Standing Committee on Agriculture, Conservation and Forestry, and was the House Chair of the Joint Select Committee on Research and Development. In his third term starting in 2000, he became the House Chair of the Natural Resources Committee. In his fourth term in the Maine House, he served on the powerful Joint Standing Committee on Appropriations and Financial Affairs. In his term in the Senate starting in 2004, he returned to the Natural Resources committee as the Senate Chair, and also served as a member of the Joint Standing Committee on Utilities and Energy.

In 1998, Cowger supported raising Maine's minimum wage.

Cowger was born on December 3, 1959, in Brunswick, Maine. He earned a B.S. from Swarthmore College in 1982. Cowger is openly gay. Cowger and Vincent Hannan have owned and operated the Maple Hill Farm Inn and Conference Center in Hallowell, Maine since 1992.
