= Lois Snowe-Mello =

American politician

Member of the Maine Senate from the 15th district
- In office 2010–2012
- Preceded by: Deborah Simpson
- Succeeded by: John Cleveland

Personal details
- Born: Lois Anita Snowe; February 27, 1948 Passaic, New Jersey, US
- Died: January 24, 2016 (aged 67) Auburn, Maine, US
- Party: Republican
- Spouse: Brian

Lois Anita Snowe-Mello (February 27, 1948 – January 24, 2016) was an American politician from Maine. Snowe-Mello was a Republican state senator from Maine's 15th District, representing her residence in Poland as well as Auburn, Minot and New Gloucester. She graduated from the County College of Hair Design in 1972 as well as studying at the County College of Morris (1976 to 1978) and Arizona State University (1980).

She served in the Maine House of Representatives for eight years, being first elected in 1996. She first was elected to the Senate in 2004, beating incumbent State Senator Neria Douglass. She was reelected in 2006. In 2008, she faced a tough challenge from Representative Deborah Simpson and narrowly lost reelection. In 2010, Snowe-Mello bested Simpson in a rematch.

She was a cousin of Peter T. Snowe, former U.S. Senator Olympia Snowe's first husband.

She was predeceased by her husband, Brian Mello, who died April 15, 2015.

From 2010 to 2012, Snowe-Mello was appointed chair of the Engrossed Bills and Marine Resources committees.
