= Christine Savage =

American politician (1931–2023)

Christine R. Savage

Member of the Maine Senate from the 22nd district
- In office 2000–2008
- Succeeded by: Chris Rector

Personal details
- Born: August 5, 1931 Union, Maine, U.S.
- Died: May 12, 2023 (aged 91)
- Party: Republican
- Spouse: Elmer 'Bud' Savage

Christine R. Savage (August 5, 1931 – May 12, 2023) was an American politician from Maine. Savage served in the Maine Legislature from 1994 to 2008, including six years in the Maine House of Representatives and eight years in the Maine Senate. She also served on the Union Board of Selectmen.

Savage studied public administration at the University of Maine. She had five siblings, all of whom died before her. She was married to Elmer 'Bud' Savage. Christine Savage died on May 12, 2023, at the age of 91.

== Electoral History ==
General Election for Maine State Senate District 12, 2000
Party	Candidate	Votes	%
Republican	Christine R. Savage	10,236	53.5%
Democratic	Judith A. Power	8,909	46.5%

General Election for Maine State Senate District 12, 2002
Party	Candidate	Votes	%
Republican	Christine R. Savage	9,134	58.4%
Democratic	Stefan Matthew Pakulski	6,514	41.6%

General Election for Maine State Senate District 22, 2004
Party	Candidate	Votes	%
Republican	Christine R. Savage	11,642	55.3%
Democratic	Marian M. Swan	9,408	44.7%

General Election for Maine State Senate District 22, 2006
Party	Candidate	Votes	%
Republican	Christine R. Savage	8,845	52.5%
Democratic	Scott Barrows	7,995	47.5%
