= John Cleveland (politician) =

American politician from Maine

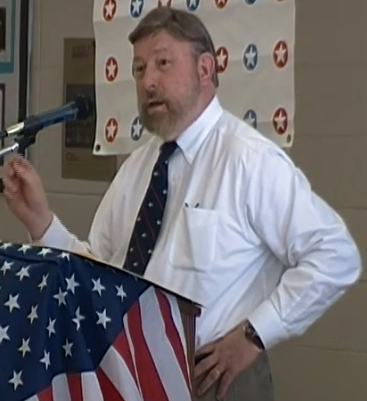
- Cleveland in 2012

Member of the Maine Senate from the 15th district
- In office December 5, 2012 – December 3, 2014
- Preceded by: Lois Snowe-Mello
- Succeeded by: Roger J. Katz

Member of the Maine Senate from the 22nd district
- In office December 5, 1990 – December 2, 1998
- Preceded by: R. Peter Whitmore
- Succeeded by: Neria Douglass

Personal details
- Born: January 30, 1950 (age 76)
- Party: Democratic
- Spouse: Debora Cleveland
- Profession: Consultant

John Cleveland is an American politician from Maine. Cleveland, a Democrat from Auburn, served as a State Senator from Maine's 15th District, representing much of Androscoggin County, including the population center of Auburn. Cleveland lost his re-election bid in 2014 to Republican Eric Brakey.

He was first elected to the Maine State Senate in 1990 and re-elected in 1992, 1994 and 1996 before being unable to seek re-election in 1998 due to term-limits. He was re-elected in 2012 after defeating incumbent Republican Lois Snowe-Mello. He graduated from Edward Little High School in Auburn and then the University of Southern Maine in 1982.

He served on the Auburn City Council from 1977 to 1981 and as Mayor of Auburn from 1981 to 1987.
