= Sharon Treat =

American politician and attorney

Sharon Anglin Treat

Member of the Maine House of Representatives for the 79th District (Hallowell)
- In office December 2006 – December 2014

Majority Leader of the Maine Senate
- In office 2002–2004

Member of the Maine Senate
- In office 1996–2004

Member of the Maine House of Representatives for the 79th District
- In office 1990–1996

Personal details
- Born: January 30, 1956 (age 70) Brattleboro, Vermont, U.S.
- Party: Democratic
- Education: Princeton University (A.B.) Georgetown University Law Center (J.D.)
- Profession: Lawyer

Sharon Anglin Treat (born January 30, 1956) is an American politician and attorney from Maine. A Democrat, Treat served in the Maine Legislature from 1990 until 2014. Treat represented Hallowell, Maine in Kennebec County in the Maine House of Representatives from 2006 until 2014. She was unable to seek re-election in 2014 due to term-limits.

During Treat's time in the Legislature, she was a well-known foe of the private health insurance industry and pharmaceutical industry.

Treat was first elected to the Maine House in 1990 and served until 1996. From 1996 to 2004, Treat served as a State Senator, including a term (2002–04) as the Senate Majority Leader. Unable to run for re-election to the State Senate in 2004, Treat returned to the House. She was replaced by Scott Cowger (D-Hallowell).

== Personal ==
Treat was born on January 30, 1956, in Brattleboro, Vermont. She graduated with an A.B. from the Woodrow Wilson School of Public and International Affairs at Princeton University in 1978 after completing a 191-page long senior thesis titled "Rising Costs and Constrained Resources: Agricultural Energy Use in the United States." She then graduated with a J.D. from Georgetown University Law Center in 1982.
