= Jane Amero =

Maine politician

Member of the Maine Senate from the 30th district
- In office 1992–2000

Personal details
- Born: August 6, 1941 (age 84) Rumford, Maine, U.S.
- Party: Republican

Jane A. Amero (born August 6, 1941) is an American teacher and politician from Maine. Amero, a Republican, served in the Maine State Senate from 1992 to 2000, representing her residence in Cape Elizabeth, Maine and nearby areas of Cumberland County.

Prior to serving in the State Senate, Amero served in local government for 15 years, including 6 years on the Cape Elizabeth School Board and 9 years on the Cape Elizabeth Town Council. Amero also chaired the State Board of Education for three years. Amero served as the highest ranking elected Republican in Maine government from 1996 to 2000, when she was twice elected by her colleagues as Minority Leader of the Maine Senate. Unable to run again due to term-limits, Amero challenged Democrat Tom Allen for Congress in 2000. In a three-way race which also featured Libertarian Party candidate Frederic Staples, Amero garnered 36.5% of the vote, losing to the incumbent Allen.

Amero was born and raised in Rumford, Maine and graduated from Cornell University on a full scholarship. Amero taught in local schools from 1963 to 1967. Following the end of her time in the State Senate, Amero worked as the Director of Governmental Relations with the law firm Pierce Atwood.
