= Lisa Marrache =

American physician and politician

Lisa Tessier Marrache

Member of the Maine Senate from the 25th district
- In office December 2006 – December 2010
- Preceded by: Kenneth Gagnon
- Succeeded by: Thomas Martin

Personal details
- Party: Democratic
- Profession: Physician

Lisa Tessier Marrache is an American physician and politician from Maine. Marrache served as a Democratic State Senator from Maine's 25th District, representing much of Kennebec County, including population centers of Waterville and Winslow as well as two communities in Somerset County, including Pittsfield. She was first elected to the Maine State Senate in 2006 and withdrew from re-election in 2010 after winning the uncontested Democratic nomination. From 2008 to 2010, Marrache served as Assistant Senate Majority Leader.

In 1999, Marrache was first elected to public office as a city councilor in Waterville. A year later, she was elected to the Maine House of Representatives. She was re-elected in 2002 and 2004 before replacing Kenneth Gagnon in the Maine Senate in 2006.

== Personal ==
Marrache earned a B.S. in chemistry from Columbus State University in Georgia and her M.D. from Medical College of Georgia.
