= Earle McCormick =

American politician

Member of the Maine Senate from the 21st district
- In office 2006–2012
- Preceded by: Sharon Benoit
- Succeeded by: Patrick Flood

Personal details
- Party: Republican
- Spouse: Darlene McCormick
- Profession: Teacher, United States Air Force

Earle L. McCormick Jr. is an American politician and retired teacher. McCormick served as a Republican State Senator from Maine's 21st District, where he represented part of Kennebec County, including Hallowell and Gardiner.

McCormick graduated from Gardiner High School in 1961. He received a bachelor's degree in meteorology from Saint Louis University and a master's degree in meteorology from the Naval Postgraduate School.

He was first elected to the Maine State Senate in 2006 after serving from 2002 to 2006 as state representative. He served as chair of the Health and Human Services committee in the State Senate in 2011 and 2012.

McCormick spent 23 years in the United States Air Force. In 1967, he was promoted to staff sergeant while serving as a weather observer with the Air Weather Service at Eielson Air Force Base in Alaska. After retiring from the Air Force, he returned to Maine and taught mathematics and coached high school sports. He lives in West Gardiner, Maine.

== Elections ==
In 2008, McCormick defeated Democrat Sharon Benoit with approximately 54% of the vote.

In 2010, McCormick defeated Winthrop Town Councilor Patrice Putman with more than 62% of the vote in a two-way race.

After winning an uncontested primary for re-election to the Maine Senate in June 2012, McCormick announced that he would withdraw from the general election.

In December 2020, McCormick announced he would run in a March 2021 special election for his prior seat in the Maine Senate. The vacancy was created by former Senator Shenna Bellows' election as Maine Secretary of State.
