= Walter Gooley =

American politician

Member of the Maine Senate from the 18th district
- In office 2006–2010
- Preceded by: Chandler Woodcock
- Succeeded by: Tom Saviello

Personal details
- Born: April 27, 1934 (age 92) Pittsfield, Massachusetts
- Party: Republican

Walter R. Gooley (born April 27, 1934) is an American politician from Maine. Gooley served as a Republican State Senator from Maine's 18th District, representing part of Kennebec and Franklin Counties, including his residence in Farmington. He was first elected to the Maine State Senate in 2006 after serving for 8 years (4 terms) in the Maine House of Representatives from 1994 to 2002.

Gooley graduated from the University of Connecticut in 1957 with a B.S. in forestry and entomology.
