= Nancy Sullivan (politician) =

American politician (born 1949)

Member of the Maine Senate from the 4th district
- In office 2004–2012
- Succeeded by: David Dutremble

Personal details
- Born: March 27, 1949 (age 77) Biddeford, Maine, USA
- Party: Democratic
- Profession: Schoolteacher, politician

Nancy B. Sullivan (born March 27, 1949) is an American politician and schoolteacher from Maine. Sullivan served as a Democratic State Senator from Maine's 4th District, representing part of York County, including the city of Biddeford and the neighboring towns of Kennebunkport, Arundel and Kennebunk from 2004 to 2012. She teaches history at Saco Middle School and was inspired to run for office by former State Senator and gubernatorial candidate Libby Mitchell. She graduated from Thornton Academy in Saco and the University of Southern Maine. Sullivan won re-election in 2008 with more than 73% of the vote.

Sullivan was unable to run for re-election to the Maine Senate in 2012 due to term-limits. Instead, she challenged incumbent Democratic State Representative and Mayor of Biddeford Alan Casavant for one of the town's three seats in the Maine House of Representatives. She was unable to win the nomination from Casavant.
