= Phil Harriman =

American politician

Member of the Maine Senate from the 23rd district
- In office 1992–2000

Personal details
- Born: February 1, 1955 (age 71) Biddeford, Maine
- Party: Republican
- Spouse: Christine

Phillip Harriman (born February 1, 1955) is an American politician and political commentator. A Republican, Harriman served four terms in the Maine Senate from 1992 to 2000. He represented a portion of Cumberland County, including his residence in Yarmouth. He served on the Yarmouth Town Council from 1986 to 1991. In 1996 Harriman accused lawmakers who proposed cutting funding for the Governor Baxter School for the Deaf of being disabled.

Harriman was born in Biddeford, Maine, on February 1, 1955. He attended Husson University and Bryn Mawr College. He is married and has three children.

== Current work ==
Harriman is the co-owner and founder of Lebel & Harriman, a financial services company. He, together with Ethan Strimling, serves as a columnist for the Portland Press Herald, and is frequently tapped as a political analyst on local television.
