= Vinton Cassidy =

American politician from Maine

Vinton E. Cassidy

Member of the Maine Senate from the 3rd district
- In office 1992–1998
- Preceded by: Harry Vose

Personal details
- Born: Calais, Maine
- Party: Republican
- Profession: College instructor

Vinton Cassidy is an American politician from Maine. Vinton, a Republican, was elected a Washington County Commissioner in November 2013. He had previously served as State Senator from 1992 to 1998, representing District 3 in Washington County. In 1992, he defeated incumbent Democrat Harry Vose to take the seat. He has also been appointed to state boards by two governors, Democrat John Baldacci and Republican Paul LePage.

== Personal ==
Cassidy was born and raised in Calais, Maine and he graduated from Calais High School and nearby Northern Maine Vocational Technical College (NMVTC) before graduating from the University of Southern Maine. In 2012, he began his thirty-third year of instructing at Washington County Community College (formerly NMVTC).

== Political experience ==
Cassidy was first elected to the Calais Town Council in 1971. Serving until 1987, he served several terms as mayor. In 1992, he won a three-way race and defeated incumbent Democrat Harry Vose for the District 3 State Senate seat. He served until 1998. He was appointed by Governor John Baldacci to the Commission on Government, Ethics, and Election Practices, where he served two years. He was also appointed by Governor Paul LePage to serve on the Maine State Board of Corrections.
