= Lynn Bromley =

American politician and family therapist

Member of the Maine Senate from the 7th district
- In office 2000–2008
- Succeeded by: Larry Bliss

Personal details
- Party: Democratic
- Education: Bridgewater State College (BA); Boston College (MSW)
- Profession: Family therapist

Lynn Bromley is an American politician and family therapist from Maine. From 2000 to 2008, Bromley, a Democrat, represented South Portland, Cape Elizabeth and Scarborough in the Maine Senate, where she was chair of the Joint Standing Committee on Business, Research and Economic Development. She was unable to run in 2008 because of term limits. In December 2010, she was appointed New England regional advocate for the federal Small Business Administration. She was recommended by Republican US Senator Susan Collins.

Bromley earned a B.A. from Bridgewater State College and a M.S.W. from Boston College.
