= Chris Rector =

American politician and entrepreneur

Member of the Maine Senate from the 22nd district
- In office 2008–2012
- Preceded by: Christine Savage (R)
- Succeeded by: Edward Mazurek (D)

Personal details
- Born: July 12, 1951 (age 75) Needham, Massachusetts, U.S.
- Party: Republican
- Spouse: Elisabeth Rector
- Profession: Entrepreneur

Christopher W. Rector (born July 12, 1951) is an American politician and entrepreneur. Rector served as a Republican State Senator from Maine's 22nd District, representing much of Knox County, including Rockland and his residence in Thomaston. He graduated from the Boston University College of General Studies and earned a Bachelor of Arts from the University of Southern Maine. He attended the Kennedy School of Government at Harvard University in 2006 on a Brooks Fellowship. He served in the Maine House of Representatives from 2002 to 2006. He served as Chairman of the Joint Standing Committee on Labor, Commerce, Research, and Economic Development, and also served on the Joint Standing Committee on Energy, Utilities, and Technology and Joint Select Committee on Regulatory Reform. He serves on the Community Preservation Advisory Committee, the Maine Economic Growth Council, and the board of the Maine Compact for Higher Education. He is co-chair of Maine Solutions, a consensus-building training and facilitation group for legislators and public officials. He helped to develop the Midcoast Leadership Academy, which offered classes in leadership development. He was appointed to and has served on the Joint Select Committee on Research, Development, and the Innovation Economy in the summer of 2006 the Joint Select Committee on Prosperity in the summer of 2007, and the Joint Select Committee on Maine's Energy Future in the winter of 2009.

In 1999, Rector became a firefighter in his hometown of Thomaston. He was also the longtime owner of The Bayview Press, an art gallery and printing shop that he ran with his wife Elisabeth. They also formerly owned the Camden Cone, a popular ice cream stand in Camden, ME.

Rector has also served as a "Regional Representative for United States Senator Angus King working in the Augusta, Maine office. His self-described region is "the coast of Maine from the Sheepscot River to Calais."
