= Peggy Pendleton =

American politician and registered nurse

Member of the Maine Senate
- In office 1996–2004

Personal details
- Born: February 9, 1946 (age 80) Lackawanna, New York
- Party: Democratic
- Profession: Nurse

Peggy A. Pendleton (born February 9, 1946) is an American politician and registered nurse from Maine. A Democrat, Pendleton served a total of 9 terms (18 years) in the Maine Legislature. She served from 1988 to 1994 and 2006 to 2010 in the Maine House of Representatives representing part of Scarborough, Maine. From 1996 to 2004, Pendleton represented part of Cumberland County, including Scarborough, in the Maine Senate.

== Education ==
Pendleton studied at the University of Southern Maine and Eastern Maine Medical Center School of Nursing. Pendleton is a retired nurse. She also taught at Southern Maine Vocational Technical Institute from 1980 to 1988.
