= Elizabeth Schneider =

American politician (born 1962)

Member of the Maine Senate from the 32nd district
- In office 2004–2012
- Preceded by: Mary Cathcart
- Succeeded by: Emily Cain

Personal details
- Born: 1962 (age 63–64) Lexington, Virginia
- Party: Democratic

Elizabeth M. Schneider (born 1962) is an American politician from Maine. Schneider served as a Democratic State Senator from Maine's 32nd District, representing part of Penobscot County, including the population centres of Orono and Lincoln. She was first elected to the Maine State Senate in 2004 after serving from 1996 to 2004 in the town government of Orono. Unable to run for re-election in 2012 due to term-limits, Schneider was replaced in the State Senate by Democratic State Representative Emily Cain.

== Personal ==
Schneider and her family moved from Lexington, Virginia to Massachusetts a year after her birth in 1963. Schneider's parents were active in the peace and equal rights movements of the 1960s and 1970s. She graduated from Washington Irving High School, an all-girls high school in Lower Manhattan. She met her husband while studying at the University of Colorado Boulder from 1982–1983. The couple moved to Orono in 1987. She also graduated from Travel Trade of Boulder in 1984 and attended Nantes University in France in 1982.
