= Stanley Gerzofsky =

American politician (1944–2026)

Member of the Maine Senate from the 10th district
- In office 2009–2017
- Succeeded by: Brownie Carson

Personal details
- Born: December 18, 1944 New York City, U.S.
- Died: January 21, 2026 (aged 81)
- Party: Democratic

Stanley J. Gerzofsky (December 18, 1944 – January 21, 2026) was an American politician from the state of Maine. A Brunswick resident, Gerzofsky represented the 10th Senate District. He was first elected to the Maine House of Representatives representing Brunswick in 2000 and served in the House until he was term-limited out in 2008, when he ran for the State Senate. He was a member of the Brunswick Democratic Committee from 1980 and the Cumberland County Democratic Committee from 1990.

== Career before politics ==
Gerzofsky was a furniture manufacturer prior to entering politics.

== State legislative tenure ==
Following the closure of the Maine State Prison in 2002, Gerzofsky led an effort in the state House to convert the shuttered facility for another use.

In the state Senate, Gerzofsky represented District 24, which includes Brunswick, Harpswell, Freeport, Pownal, and North Yarmouth. Gerzofsky was elected to a fourth term in the Senate in 2014.

Gerzofsky was described as the leading advocate in the Maine Legislature for dam safety. Maine has many structurally deficient dams that present a public hazard; Gerzofsky advocated implementing the recommendations of a state task force to fund dam safety inspections.

He served as co-chairman of the Legislature's Criminal Justice Committee. As co-chair, he opposed a project to spend $100 million to raze the Maine Correctional Center in Windham and build a new prison complex in its place. Gerzofsky also served as the co-chairman of the Forensic Mental Health Services Oversight Committee.

Gerzofsky, a hunter and gun owner, had "a long history of opposing NRA-sponsored bills" while holding public office. He supported legislation to bar the carrying of guns at Acadia National Park and the St. Croix Island International Historic Site. In 2013 he co-sponsored legislation to promote background checks for the private sales of guns by imposing a "civil fine of $500 if a gun seller does not perform a background check and the buyer is later discovered to be a prohibited person." However, Gerzofsky also supported legislation that would block landlords from prohibiting subsidized tenants from keeping guns in their apartments.

In 2016, Gerzofsky was ineligible to run for reelection to the Senate due to term limits.

== Death ==
Gerzofsky died at his home on January 21, 2026, at the age of 81.
