= Barry Hobbins =

American politician

Public Advocate of Maine
- Incumbent
- Assumed office May 2017
- Appointed by: Paul R. LePage
- Preceded by: Timothy Schnieder

Member of the Maine House of Representatives from the 133rd district
- In office December 5, 2012 – December 3, 2016
- Preceded by: Donald Pilon
- Succeeded by: Ralph Chapman

Member of the Maine Senate from the 5th district
- In office December 1, 2004 – December 5, 2012
- Preceded by: Dennis Damon
- Succeeded by: Linda Valentino

Member of the Maine Senate from the 31st district
- In office December 7, 1988 – December 5, 1990
- Preceded by: John M. Kerry
- Succeeded by: Charles E. Summers

Member of the Maine House of Representatives from the 119th district
- In office 1972 – December 5, 1984
- Succeeded by: John N. Diamond

Personal details
- Born: May 17, 1951 (age 75) Biddeford, Maine, U.S.
- Party: Democratic
- Spouse: Donna Hobbins
- Education: University of Maine (BA); University of New Hampshire (JD)
- Occupation: lawyer
- Website: Barry Hobbins

Barry J. Hobbins (born May 17, 1951) is an American lawyer, politician and is the current Public Advocate of Maine. A Democrat, he served in the Maine House of Representatives, representing part of Saco. As a State Senator, he represented several towns in York County, including Buxton, Dayton, Old Orchard Beach as well as Saco.

His election to the Maine House in 2012 came after serving for 8 consecutive years in the Maine Senate (2004-2012). From 2010 to 2012, Hobbins served as the Minority Leader of the Maine Senate.

Hobbins is a practicing attorney and law-firm partner in Saco. From 1988 to 2007, Hobbins served on the University of New England Board of Trustees.

== Biography ==
Hobbins was first elected to the 106th legislature in 1972 at the age of 21. In 1973, he earned a BA from the University of Maine and, in 1977, a JD from Franklin Pierce Law Center. Hobbins was elected as a State Senator in 2004 and began his third term in 2010.

As an attorney, Hobbins served as chair of the Judiciary Committee in the State Senate and a member of the Utility and Energy Committee.

In April 2017, Hobbins was nominated by Gov. Paul LePage to serve as the State of Maine's next utility ratepayer advocate.
