= Jeffrey Butland =

American politician

Jeffrey H. Butland

Member of the Maine Senate from the 26th district
- In office 1992–1996

Personal details
- Born: December 7, 1950 Portland, Maine, U.S.
- Died: August 1, 2004 (aged 53)
- Party: Republican
- Education: Bates College

Jeffrey Butland (December 7, 1950 – August 1, 2004) was an American politician from Maine. A Republican, Butland spent 8 years split between the Maine House of Representatives and the Maine Senate. represented (District 26 Cumberland County). He was also a local officeholder in the town of Cumberland, Maine.

Upon his election as President of the 117th Maine Senate in December 1994, Butland became the first Republican in that position since 1982. He was sworn in by Republican Governor John McKernan on December 7, 1994. Butland was appointed the New England administrator of the Small Business Administration in 2002 by President George W. Bush.

== Personal ==
Butland was born in Portland, Maine and lived there until the age of 13, when his family moved to Cumberland. He graduated from Bates College. He served four years in the United States Marine Corps and 22 years as a reservist. He died of a heart attack at age 53 on August 1, 2004.
