= Beverly Bustin =

American politician

Beverly Miner Bustin-Hatheway

Member of the Maine Senate from the 19 district
- In office 1980–1996

Personal details
- Born: February 14, 1936 (age 90) Morrisville, Vermont
- Party: Democrat
- Spouse: David Bustin
- Education: Thomas College

Beverly Miner Bustin-Hatheway (born February 14, 1936) is an American politician from Maine. Bustin, a Democrat, served from 1980 to 1996 in the Maine Senate, representing Kennebec County, Maine, which includes her residence in Augusta, Maine. During her final four years in office, Bustin was twice elected Assistant Majority Leader by her colleagues.

In 2007, Bustin was elected Register of Deeds for Kennebec County.

In the early 1970s, Bustin worked as field representative for U.S. Senator Edmund Muskie, covering much of central Maine.

== Personal ==
Beverly Bustin was born on February 14, 1936, in Morrisville, Vermont. One of 16 children, Bustin and her family moved to Kittery, Maine during World War II so that her father could work at the Portsmouth Naval Shipyard. Her family eventually settled in the Sebago Lake region. She graduated from Standish High School 3rd out a class of 23. She took the civil service exam during high school and immediately after graduating moved to Washington D.C. to work for the Veterans Affairs Department and attend the District of Columbia Teachers College. Before graduating, Bustin moved back to Maine at the behest of her then boyfriend, David Bustin, and attended Nasson Teachers’ College before graduating from Thomas College.

Beverly Bustin was married to David Bustin, former state legislator from Augusta. The two started dating when Beverly Bustin was 17. Prior to dating her husband, Beverly Miner was a Republican, as was almost all of her family. She then became a Democrat.
