= David Hastings (politician) =

American politician and lawyer

Member of the Maine Senate from the 13th district
- In office 2004–2012
- Preceded by: Rick Bennett
- Succeeded by: James Hamper

Personal details
- Born: Fryeburg, Maine
- Party: Republican
- Spouse: Carol Hastings
- Profession: Lawyer

David R. Hastings III is an American politician and lawyer from Maine. Hastings served as a Republican State Senator from Maine's 13th District, representing parts of Cumberland and Oxford Counties, including his residence of Fryeburg. A lifelong resident of Fryeburg, Hastings earned a B.A. from Bowdoin College and a J.D. from Temple University Beasley School of Law. He was first elected to the Maine Senate in 2004 and was unable to run for re-election in 2012 due to term-limits. He was replaced by fellow Republican James Hamper.

Hastings is a practicing lawyer in Fryeburg.
