= Debra Plowman =

American politician and businesswoman

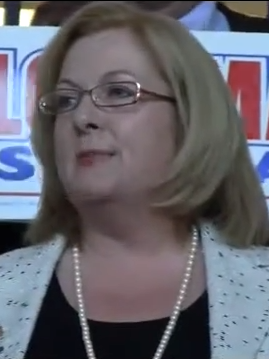
- Plowman in 2012

Member of the Maine Senate from the 33rd district
- In office 2004–2012
- Preceded by: Betty Lou Mitchell
- Succeeded by: Andre Cushing III

Personal details
- Born: Hampden, Maine
- Party: Republican
- Profession: Businesswoman
- Website: Plowman For Senate

Debra D. Plowman is an American politician and businesswoman from Maine. Plowman served as a Republican State Senator from Maine's 33rd District, representing western Penobscot County, including the population centers of Hampden, Dexter and Newburgh. She was first elected to the Maine State Senate in 2003 after serving from 1992 to 2000 in the Maine House of Representatives. Following the gaining of the Republican majority in the Maine State Senate in the November 2010 election, Plowman was elected Assistant Majority Leader by her colleagues. She also sought her Party's nomination for the US Senate following Olympia Snowe's retirement. She lost to Secretary of State Charlie Summers.

As a state senator, Plowman served on the Legal and Veterans Affairs Committee, and is a member of the Presiding Officers Select Committee on Ethics. Plowman serves on the civil justice committee of the conservative American Legislative Exchange Council (ALEC).

In 1993 as a state representative, Plowman helped design landmark child support reform. In 1999, Plowman unsuccessfully sought to reinstate capital punishment in Maine.

In March 2012, Plowman announced her candidacy for the Republican Party's nomination for U.S. Senator to replace the retiring Olympia Snowe. Plowman finished in sixth and last place in the Republican primary with 9% of the vote. Secretary of State Charlie Summers won the Republican primary.
