= Stephen Hall (politician) =

American politician

Member of the Maine Senate
- In office 1992–1998

Personal details
- Born: Stephen Emerson Hall; October 8, 1941 Dover-Foxcroft, Maine, U.S.
- Died: May 9, 2014 (aged 72) Guilford, Maine, U.S.
- Party: Republican

Stephen Emerson Hall (October 8, 1941 – May 9, 2014) was an American police officer, realtor, and politician. A Republican from Guilford, Hall served three terms (1992–1998) in the Maine Senate.

== Early life ==
Hall was born on October 8, 1941, in Dover-Foxcroft, Maine, and graduated from Foxcroft Academy in 1960.

== Career ==
Hall moved to Houlton, Maine, where he ran a First National chain of grocery stores and later worked as a police officer with the Houlton Police Department. Leaving Houlton, Hall joined the Maine Warden Service, where he was first based in Jackman and later in Guilford in Piscataquis County. After retiring from the Maine Warden Service, Hall became a realtor and was elected to three terms in the Maine Senate. He also served on the SAD 4 School Board.

== Personal life ==
Hall died unexpectedly in his sleep on May 9, 2014.
