= Dennis Damon =

American politician

Member of the Maine Senate from the 28th district
- In office 2002–2010
- Preceded by: Jill Goldthwait
- Succeeded by: Brian Langley

Personal details
- Born: December 21, 1948 (age 77) Bar Harbor, Maine
- Party: Democratic

Dennis S. Damon (born December 21, 1948) is an American politician from Maine. Damon served as a Democratic State Senator from Maine's 5th, then following redistricting, 28th District, representing much of Hancock County, including the population centers of Bar Harbor and Ellsworth from 2002 to 2010.

Damon was born in Bar Harbor, Maine, grew up in Northeastern Harbor and resides in Trenton. He earned a B.A. from the University of Maine in 1971. He served as County Commissioner for three terms prior to running for state senate. He replaced unenrolled Jill Goldthwait, who was unable to run again due to term limits.

On April 22, 2009, Damon and 60 co-sponsors introduced a bill entitled "An Act To End Discrimination in Civil Marriage and Affirm Religious Freedom", which allowed same-sex couples the right to marry in the state. After having been passed by both the Senate and House, Governor John Baldacci signed the bill into law on May 6, 2009. The law was subsequently repealed by Maine citizens at the ballot box.

Damon was unable to run for re-election in 2010 due to term-limits. He was replaced in District 28 by Republican Brian Langley.

Damon endorsed unenrolled candidate Eliot Cutler for governor in 2010 and 2014. He is also executive director of political non-profit OneMaine.
