= John Nutting (politician) =

American politician

John M. Nutting VII

Member of the Maine Senate from the 17th district
- In office: 1996–2002; 2004–2010
- Succeeded by: Garrett Mason

Personal details
- Born: August 29, 1949 (age 77) Lewiston, Maine, U.S.
- Party: Democratic
- Education: University of Maine (BA)
- Profession: Dairy farmer

John M. Nutting VII (born August 29, 1949) is an American politician and retired dairy farmer from Maine. Nutting was a member of the Maine House of Representatives from 1986 to 1992 and served in the Maine Senate from 1996 to 2002 and again from 2004 to 2010. In 2002, Nutting sought the Maine Democratic Party's nomination for Maine's 2nd congressional district. He finished fourth, losing in the Democratic primary to Mike Michaud.

Running for re-election to his sixth term (third consecutive) in the Maine Senate in 2010, Nutting lost to Republican Garrett Mason. Mason's supporters spent $50,000 in private money against Nutting.

== Personal ==
Nutting was born in Lewiston, Maine and earned a B.S. degree in pre-veterinary sciences from the University of Maine in 1971. He is a retired dairy farmer in Leeds, Maine.

== Career ==
Nutting served as Senate Chair of the legislature's Joint Committee on Agriculture, Conservation, and Forestry. In 2009, he authored legislation supported by the Humane Society of the United States prohibiting the confinement of pigs and calves in gestation crates and veal crates. The legislation was passed unanimously by both chambers and signed by Governor John Baldacci.
