= Libby Mitchell =

American politician (born 1940)

President of the Maine Senate
- In office 2008–2010
- Preceded by: Beth Edmonds
- Succeeded by: Kevin Raye

Member of the Maine Senate from the 24th district
- In office 2004–2010
- Succeeded by: Roger Katz

Speaker of the Maine House of Representatives
- In office 1997–1999
- Preceded by: Dan Gwadosky
- Succeeded by: Steven Rowe

Personal details
- Born: Elizabeth Anne Harrill; June 22, 1940 (age 86) Gaffney, South Carolina, U.S.
- Party: Democratic
- Spouse: Jim Mitchell
- Education: Furman University (BA); University of North Carolina, Chapel Hill (MA); University of Maine School of Law (JD)

Elizabeth H. Mitchell (born Elizabeth Anne Harrill on June 22, 1940) is an American politician from Maine. Mitchell, a Democrat, represented Vassalboro, which is part of Kennebec County in the Maine Senate from 2004 to 2010. Mitchell was also the Democrats' 2010 candidate for the office of Governor of Maine. She finished in third place behind Republican Paul LePage and independent attorney Eliot Cutler. She is the only woman in United States history to have been elected as both speaker of her state house of representatives and president of her state senate.

== Career ==
Mitchell represented the 24th State Senate District from 2004 to 2010. She was also the Speaker of the Maine House of Representatives and as President of the Maine Senate (2008–2010), becoming the first woman in the United States to have held both positions, and the third person ever to do so.

Mitchell was a member of the Maine House of Representatives from 1974 through 1984. She ran for the U.S. Senate in 1984, earning 24% of the vote against incumbent William Cohen. From 1986 to 1990, Mitchell served as director of the Maine State Housing Authority. She also ran for the U.S. Congress in the 1990 Democratic Primary, finishing third with 17% of the vote. She was again elected to the Maine State Legislature in 1990 and served through 1998. She was Speaker of the House from 1997 through 1998. In 2004, she was elected to serve Maine's 24th district in the senate, and on December 3, 2008, she was unanimously elected as Maine’s 113th Senate President.

== Campaign for governor ==
On August 11, 2009, it was announced in the Portland Press Herald that Mitchell had filed the paperwork to run for Governor of Maine in 2010. In the Maine Democratic primary election on June 8, 2010, Mitchell was selected as the Democratic nominee. She faced Republican Paul LePage, and Independent candidates Eliot Cutler, Shawn Moody, and Kevin Scott.

Mitchell conceded in the gubernatorial race at 10:00 PM EST on the evening of the election. Mitchell remarked, "I will be supportive of the next governor, whoever that is" — alluding that it was still uncertain at that hour whether Cutler or LePage would win the race.

With 94% of precincts reporting on the day after the election, the Bangor Daily News declared LePage the winner, carrying 38.1% of the votes. Cutler was in second place with 36.7% of the votes (less than 7,500 votes behind LePage), while Mitchell was a distant third with 19%. Moody and Scott had 5% and 1%, respectively.

=== 2010 endorsements ===
On June 22, 2010, Mitchell was endorsed by the Maine AFL-CIO. On June 25, 2010, Mitchell was endorsed by the Maine Education Association, which is the state's teachers' union.

== See also ==
- List of female speakers of legislatures in the United States

Political offices
Preceded by Dan Gwadosky	Speaker of the Maine House of Representatives; 1997–1999	Succeeded by Steven Rowe
Preceded by Beth Edmonds	President of the Maine Senate; 2008–2010	Succeeded by Kevin Raye
Party political offices
Preceded by William Hathaway	Democratic nominee for U.S. Senator from Maine (Class 2); 1984	Succeeded by Neil Rolde
Preceded by John Baldacci	Democratic nominee for Governor of Maine; 2010	Succeeded by Mike Michaud
