= Joseph Brannigan =

American social worker and politician

Member of the Maine Senate from the 9th district
- In office 2006–2012
- Preceded by: Michael Brennan
- Succeeded by: Anne Haskell

Personal details
- Born: July 16, 1931
- Died: January 17, 2015 (aged 83) Portland, Maine
- Party: Democratic
- Profession: Social Worker

Joseph C. Brannigan (July 16, 1931 – January 17, 2015) was an American social worker and politician from Maine. Brannigan served as a Democratic State Senator from Maine's 10th District, representing part of Portland and Westbrook. Prior to joining the State Senate, he represented part of suburban Portland in District 117 from 2000 to 2006 in the Maine House of Representatives.

== Education and career ==
Brannigan studied at the Georgetown University School of Foreign Service from 1951 to 1955. After graduating, he attended Saint John's Seminary in Boston, Massachusetts, where he later became an ordained priest. He served in South Portland and Fairfield, Maine, while also serving as chaplain at the University of Southern Maine (USM). He then completed a master's degree in counseling education from USM and became a social worker. In 2009, Brannigan retired after 34 years as director of Shalom House, a halfway house in Portland. In February 2012, Brannigan announced that he would not seek re-election, citing a lack of enthusiasm and the loss of his committee chairmanship when the Maine Republican Party took control of the Maine Senate in the 2010 election. He was replaced by Democratic Representative Anne Haskell. He died on January 17, 2015, in Portland, Maine.
