= Beth Edmonds =

American politician

Member of the Maine Senate from the 10th district
- In office 2001–2009
- Succeeded by: Stan Gerzofsky

Personal details
- Born: October 27, 1950 (age 75) Keene Valley, New York, U.S.
- Party: Democratic
- Spouse: Daniel Nickerson
- Profession: Librarian

Betheda G. Edmonds (born October 27, 1950, in Keene Valley, New York) is a librarian and former Democratic member of the Maine Senate, representing the 10th District from 2001 to 2009. She became the president of the Maine Senate after winning re-election in 2004. Her former district includes the towns of Brunswick, Freeport, Harpswell and Pownal.

== Pre-political career ==
Edmonds is from Keene Valley in the Adirondack Mountains of New York. She attended Clark University from 1967 to 1972. After graduation, she married Dan Nickerson, and moved to Freeport, Maine. Since moving to Maine, Edmonds has been actively involved in the National Organization for Women (NOW) and worked as an activist on the Equal Rights Amendment. She has worked at the Freeport Community Library since 1982, and became director of the library in 2005.

== Political career ==
She was a member of the state senate from winning her seat in 2000 until she was term-limited out following the 2009 election. In 2000, 2002, 2004, and 2006, Edmonds won elections to the state senate. In December 2003, Edmonds became president of the Maine State Senate, making her first in the line of succession for the governorship. She is only the second female senate president in Maine history and the first to serve a second term as president.

== Achievements as state senator ==
While a member of the state senate, Edmonds was instrumental in raising the state minimum wage, as well as resolving a longstanding conflict on the Workers' Compensation Board. She has supported eco-friendly measures such as the electronic waste recycling initiative. She also helped to establish the Baxter School for the Deaf Compensation Fund. She was equally instrumental in support for people using medical marijuana, legally.

== Election 2006 ==
Many different groups endorsed Edmonds for re-election in 2006, including conservation-minded organizations like the Sierra Club and the Maine League of Conservation Voters. Gay rights groups, like EqualityMaine, have similarly endorsed Edmonds. Likewise, labor and education groups like the Maine AFL-CIO COPE (Committee on Political Education), the Maine State Employees Association, and the National Association of Social Workers supported Edmonds' re-election. She was re-elected with 67% of the vote.
