= Carol Weston (politician) =

American politician

Member of the Maine Senate from the 23rd district
- In office 2002–2010
- Preceded by: Susan Longley (D)
- Succeeded by: Michael Thibodeau (R)

Personal details
- Born: Aroostook County, Maine, U.S.
- Party: Republican

Carol Weston is an American politician from Maine. A Republican, Weston was a member of the Maine House of Representatives from 1998 to 2002 and a State Senator from 2002 to 2010. She is a resident of Montville, Maine in Waldo County. Unable to run for re-election due to term-limits, Weston was hired as state director for Americans for Prosperity, a conservative national advocacy group. Weston served as Assistant Senate Minority Leader from 2004 to 2006 and Minority Leader from 2006 to 2008.

In 2008, Weston was named the American Legislative Exchange Council (ALEC) legislator of the year.

In March 2013, upon rumors of a potential open seat in Maine's 2nd congressional district, Weston was named as a potential Republican candidate.
