= Richard Nass =

American politician

Member of the Maine Senate from the 2nd district
- In office 2002–2010
- Succeeded by: Ronald F. Collins

Personal details
- Born: September 10, 1943 (age 82) Schenectady, New York
- Party: Republican

Richard Nass (born September 10, 1943) is an American politician from Maine. An Acton resident, Nass represented the 2nd Senate District from 2002 to 2010. Prior to being elected a Maine State Senator, he was a member of the Acton School Board from 1976 to 1991. He represented Acton, Berwick, Cornish, Lebanon, Limerick, Newfield, North Berwick, Parsonfield, Shapleigh and Wells in the Maine State Senate.

Nass graduated from Union College in 1966 with a B.A. in mathematics and the University of New Hampshire in 1975 with a Master of Business Administration (MBA) degree. He was a First Lieutenant in the United States Army from 1966 to 1969 and a member of the Army Reserves 1969–1972.
