= 2018 Maine gubernatorial election =

- November 6, 2018
- Registered: 1,058,893 (▲4.36 pp)
- Turnout: 61.24% (▼1.13 pp)
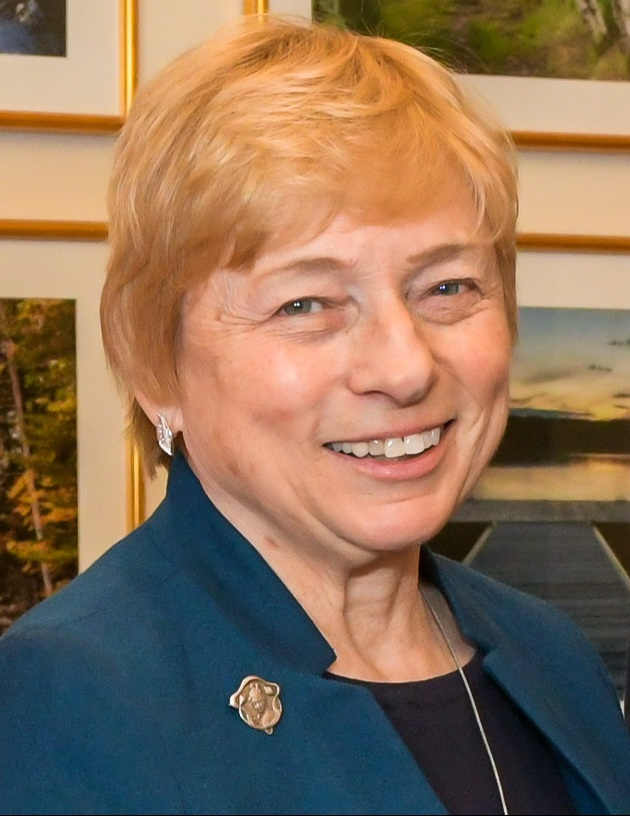

Nominee	Janet Mills	Shawn Moody	Terry Hayes
Party	Democratic	Republican	Independent
Popular vote	320,962	272,311	37,268
Percentage	50.89%	43.18%	5.91%
- Mills: 40–50% 50–60% 60–70% 70–80% 80–90% >90% Moody: 40–50% 50–60% 60–70% 70–80% 80–90% >90% Tie
Governor before election
Paul LePage
Republican
Elected Governor
Janet Mills
Democratic

The 2018 Maine gubernatorial election took place on November 6, 2018, to elect the governor of Maine. It occurred along with elections for the U.S. Senate, U.S. House, and other state and local elections. Incumbent Republican Governor Paul LePage was term-limited and could not seek a third consecutive term. He later unsuccessfully sought a third term in 2022. This was one of eight Republican-held governorships up for election in a state carried by Hillary Clinton in the 2016 presidential election.

The primaries for this election were the first in Maine to be conducted with ranked choice voting (RCV), as opposed to a simple plurality, after voters passed a citizen referendum approving the change in 2016. An advisory opinion by the Maine Supreme Judicial Court held that RCV would be unconstitutional for general elections for governor and the state legislature. This led state legislators to vote to delay its implementation pending approval of a state constitutional amendment. Backers of a "people's veto" turned in enough signatures to suspend this law until a June referendum vote, which restored RCV for future primary and congressional elections.

Governor Paul LePage threatened not to certify the results of the primary elections, saying he would "leave it up to the courts to decide." He also called the use of ranked-choice voting the "most horrific thing in the world." Secretary of State Matthew Dunlap said the results would be binding regardless of whether LePage certified them.

The Republican nominee was businessman and 2010 independent candidate for governor Shawn Moody. The Democratic candidate was Attorney General Janet Mills. State Treasurer Terry Hayes and businessman Alan Caron had qualified for the ballot as independents, though Caron dropped out on October 29 and endorsed Mills. Former state senator and former mayor of Lewiston and Auburn John Jenkins and perennial candidate Kenneth Capron ran write-in campaigns.

Mills defeated Moody and Hayes with a majority to become the first female governor of Maine. This was the first election since 2006 that Maine elected a Democratic governor. Mills was also the first gubernatorial candidate to win at least 50% of the vote since Angus King in 1998, and the first non-incumbent to do so since Kenneth M. Curtis in 1966. Mills received more votes for governor than any other candidate in Maine history, becoming the first Maine gubernatorial candidate to earn 300,000 votes. This was the first gubernatorial election since 1982 that a Democrat would win a majority of the popular vote.

== Background ==
Incumbent Republican Paul LePage was term-limited, having been elected twice consecutively in 2010 and 2014. LePage did not win a majority of the vote either time (receiving 37.6% in a crowded four-way race in 2010 and 48.2% in a three-way race in 2014), with Democrats accusing independent candidate Eliot Cutler of splitting the anti-LePage vote in both instances, though Cutler finished closer to LePage than Democratic candidate Libby Mitchell in the 2010 election.

Maine's history of governors elected without majorities, including LePage, was one impetus for the citizen's referendum to implement ranked choice voting. Indeed, the last time a gubernatorial candidate received a majority of the vote was in 1998, when incumbent governor (and current United States Senator) Angus King, an independent, won reelection with 58.6% of the vote. The last time a non-incumbent candidate received more than 50% of the vote was the 1966 gubernatorial election, which Democrat Kenneth M. Curtis won over incumbent Republican John H. Reed with 53.1% of the vote.

Though ranked-choice voting was approved by voters in a 2016 referendum, the Maine Legislature voted to delay and potentially repeal RCV for all elections after an advisory opinion by the Maine Supreme Judicial Court ruled it unconstitutional for general elections for state offices. RCV supporters succeeded in a people's veto effort to prevent the delay, which suspends it until a June 2018 referendum vote. RCV supporters were victorious in the June referendum, and ranked-choice voting will remain in place for state and federal primaries and federal general elections.

== Republican primary ==
Speculation that U.S. Senator Susan Collins was considering running for governor arose during the 2015 Maine Legislative session when Representative Matt Moonen (D-Portland) introduced a bill to strip the governor (LePage at the time) of the power to appoint replacement U.S. Senators in the event of a vacancy and to instead have a special primary and general election. Moonen denied that he was motivated by Collins's possible candidacy, saying he was interested only in counterbalancing Republican-sponsored bills to change how the Maine Attorney General and Maine Secretary of State are chosen. Moonen said Collins had told him speculation about her running for governor was "silly." Collins, who was the 1994 Republican nominee for Governor, told MPBN News on January 4, 2016, that though she was "baffled" by the rumors about her being interested in running for governor, many had encouraged her to run, and she would not rule it out. In October 2017, Collins said she would not run for governor in 2018.

No Republican candidate ruled out challenging the results of a ranked-choice primary in court. Mary Mayhew called for the immediate repeal of RCV, calling it a "scam" and "probably illegal".

The Maine Republican Party filed a federal lawsuit in U.S. District Court in Bangor on May 4, 2018, seeking to bar the use of RCV for its own primary on the grounds that requiring the party to use it violates its First Amendment rights to choose its nominee as it sees fit. U.S. District Court Judge Jon Levy rejected the suit on May 29.

=== Candidates ===
==== Nominated ====
- Shawn Moody, businessman and independent candidate for governor in 2010

==== Eliminated in primary ====
- Ken Fredette, state house minority leader
- Garrett Mason, state senate majority leader
- Mary Mayhew, former commissioner of the Maine Department of Health and Human Services

==== Withdrawn ====
- Deril Stubenrod, write-in candidate for the U.S. Senate in 2014
- Mike Thibodeau, Maine Senate president

==== Declined ====
- Rick Bennett, former chairman of the Maine Republican Party, former President of the Maine Senate, candidate for the U.S. Senate in 2012 and nominee for ME-02 in 1994
- Susan Collins, U.S. senator and nominee for governor in 1994
- Nick Isgro, Mayor of Waterville
- Bruce Poliquin, U.S. representative (ran for reelection)
- Peter Vigue, businessman

=== Endorsements ===
Ken Fredette

Federal politicians

- Marco Rubio, United States senator from Florida and 2016 presidential candidate
Garrett Mason

Federal politicians

- Ted Cruz, United States senator from Texas and 2016 presidential candidate
Mary Mayhew

Federal politicians

- Newt Gingrich, former Speaker of the United States House of Representatives

Local and state politicians

- Susan Austin, state representative
- Richard Bradstreet, state representative
- Richard Campbell, state representative
- Paul Chace, state representative
- Garrel Craig, state representative
- Scott Cyrway, state senator
- Robert Foley, state representative
- Phyllis Ginzler, state representative
- James Hamper, state senator
- Jeffery Hanley, state representative
- Matthew Harrington, state representative
- Stephanie Hawke, state representative
- Gary Hilliard, state representative
- Chris Johansen, state representative
- Jonathan Kinney, state representative
- Bob Macdonald, former mayor of Lewiston
- Richard Malaby, state representative
- Beth O'Connor, state representative
- Lester Ordway, state representative
- Michael Perkins, state representative
- John Picchiotti, state representative
- Jeffrey Pierce, state representative
- Dwayne Prescott, state representative
- Deborah Sanderson, state representative
- H. Stedman Seavey, state representative
- Abden Simmons, state representative
- Paula Sutton, state representative
- Timothy Theriault, state representative
- Karleton Ward, state representative

Other individuals

- Adrienne Bennett, former spokesperson for governor Paul LePage
Shawn Moody

Individuals

- Rick Bennett, former president of the Maine Senate, former chair of the Maine Republican Party
- Ann LePage, First Lady of Maine

Newspapers

- Bangor Daily News

=== Polling ===
Poll source	Date(s) administered	Sample size	Margin of error	RCV round	Ken Fredette	Garrett Mason	Mary Mayhew	Shawn Moody	Undecided
SurveyUSA	April 26 – May 1, 2018	546	± 4.8%	Round 1	10%	15%	19%	34%	22%
SurveyUSA	April 26 – May 1, 2018	546	± 4.8%	Round 2	–	25%	26%	49%	–
SurveyUSA	April 26 – May 1, 2018	546	± 4.8%	Round 3	–	–	34%	65%	–

Hypothetical polling

Poll source	Date(s) administered	Sample size	Margin of error	Susan Collins	Mary Mayhew	Other	Undecided
Public Policy Polling	August 1–2, 2017	672	–	33%	44%	–	23%
Public Policy Polling	August 1–2, 2017	672	–	28%	–	62%	10%

=== Debate ===
Dates	Location	Fredette	Mason	Mayhew	Moody	Link
June 9, 2018		Participant	Participant	Participant	Participant	Full debate - PBS

=== Results ===
Results by county Moody: 30–40%; 40–50%; 50–60%; 60–70%

Republican primary results
Party	Candidate	Votes	%
Republican	Shawn Moody	53,436	52.6
Republican	Garrett Mason	21,571	21.2
Republican	Mary Mayhew	14,034	13.8
Republican	Blank ballots	7,203	7.1
Republican	Ken Fredette	5,341	5.3
Total votes		101,585	100.0

== Democratic primary ==
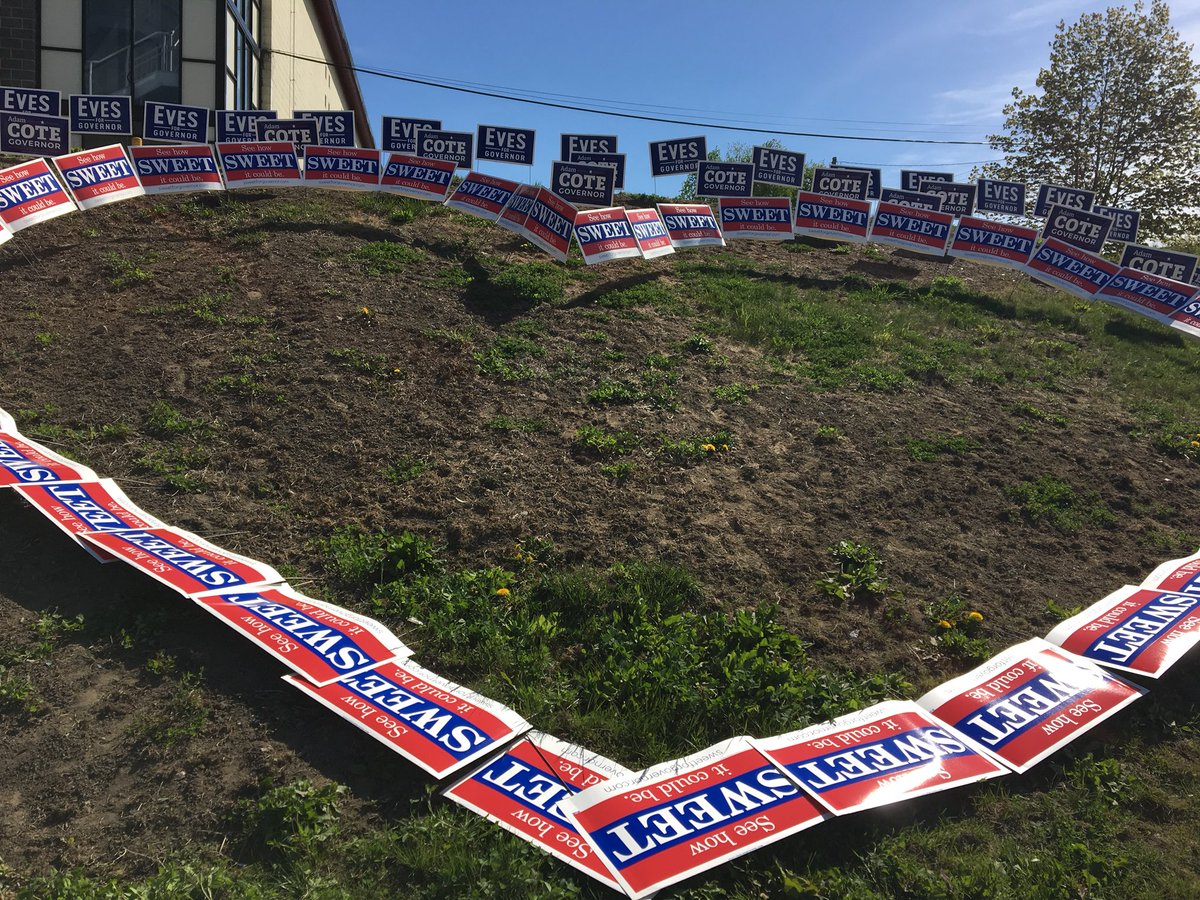
Campaign signs for Democratic candidates for Governor Betsy Sweet, Mark Eves and Adam Cote at the 2018 Maine Democratic convention at the Androscoggin Bank Colisée in Lewiston

Almost all Democratic candidates said that they would abide by the results of the ranked-choice primary, with only Janet Mills refusing to comment on the issue because it was being heard by the courts.

=== Candidates ===
==== Nominated ====
- Janet Mills, Maine Attorney General

==== Eliminated in primary ====
- Adam Cote, attorney, Iraq War veteran and candidate for ME-01 in 2008
- Donna Dion, former mayor of Biddeford
- Mark Dion, state senator and former Cumberland County Sheriff
- Mark Eves, former Speaker of the Maine House of Representatives
- Diane Russell, former state representative
- Betsy Sweet, former director of the Maine Women's Lobby

==== Failed to make ballot ====
- Dominic A. Crocitto
- Steve DeAngelis, schoolteacher
- J. Martin Vachon

==== Withdrawn ====
- James Boyle, former state senator
- Patrick Eisenhart, retired United States Coast Guard Commander
- Sean Faircloth, former mayor of Bangor and former state senator
- Kenneth Forrest Pinet

==== Declined ====
- Justin Alfond, former state senator and former President of the Maine Senate
- Yellow Light Breen, CEO of the Maine Development Foundation
- Adam Goode, former state representative
- Troy Jackson, State Senate Minority Leader
- Stephen King, author
- Chellie Pingree, U.S. Representative
- Hannah Pingree, former Speaker of the Maine House of Representatives
- Lucas St. Clair, nonprofit executive (ran for ME-02)

=== Endorsements ===
All endorsers are Democrats unless otherwise specified.

Adam Cote

Federal politicians

- Tom Allen, former US Representative for ME-01, nominee for US Senate in 2008

Local and state politicians

- Justin Alfond, former President of the Maine Senate
- Peter Baldacci, Penobscot County Commissioner
- Frank Bemis, former Presque Isle Town Council Chair
- Todd Brackett, Sheriff of Lincoln County
- Michael Brennan, former mayor of Portland, former state senator, candidate for ME-01 in 2008
- Marilyn Canavan, state representative
- Alan Casavant, Mayor of Biddeford, former state representative
- Justin Chenette, state senator
- Janice Cooper, state representative
- Tom Cote, Mayor of Sanford
- Annie Graham, former state representative
- Jon Hinck, former state representative and former Portland City Councillor
- Adam Lee, former Auburn City Councillor
- David Lemoine, former state representative
- Nate Libby, state senator, Senate Minority Whip
- Colleen Madigan, state representative
- Anne-Marie Mastraccio, state representative
- Patrick K. McGowan, former state representative, candidate for Governor in 2010, nominee for ME-02 in 1990 and 1992, former Small Business Administration Regional Administrator
- Cynthia Mehnert, Orono Town Councillor
- Cecil Munson, former Augusta City Councillor
- Kevin O'Connell, Brewer City Councillor
- Peter O'Donnell, former Mayor of Portland
- Patrick Paradis, former state representative and former Augusta City Councillor
- Josh Plourde, former Bangor City Councillor
- Christina Riley, state representative
- David Rollins, Mayor of Augusta
- Michael Sanphy, Mayor of Westbrook
- Stephen Stanley, state representative
- Spencer Thibodeau, Portland City Councillor
- Dan Tremble, Bangor City Councillor
- Anna Turcotte, Westbrook City Councillor
- Linda Valentino, state senator
- Wayne Werts, former state representative

Organizations

- Maine Council of Machinists

Newspapers

- Bangor Daily News
Steve DeAngelis (failed to make ballot)

Individuals

- Timothy Simons, actor
Mark Dion

Local and state politicians

- Benjamin Collings, state representative

Other individuals

- Francine Breton, former Cumberland County Jail Administrator
- Moses Sebunya, United States Department of Homeland Security, civil rights activist, former President of the NAACP in Maine
Mark Eves

Local and state politicians

- Joe Baldacci, former Bangor City Councillor
- Seth Berry, state representative
- Dale Denno, state representative
- Patrick Eisenhart, former gubernatorial candidate (2018)
- Sean Faircloth, Bangor City Councillor, former Mayor of Bangor, former state senator, former gubernatorial candidate (2018)
- Richard Farnsworth, state representative
- Ryan Fecteau, state representative
- Roger Fuller, state representative
- Drew Gattine, state representative
- Anne Haskell, former state senator
- Erik Jorgensen, state representative
- Chuck Kruger, former state representative
- Thomas Longstaff, state representative
- Louis Luchini, state representative
- Jay McCreight, state representative
- Jennifer Ellen Parker, state representative
- Deane Rykerson, state representative
- Linda Sanborn, former state representative
- John Alden Spear, state representative
- Ben Sprague, Mayor of Bangor
- Joan Welsh, former state representative

Individuals

- Adam Lee, small business owner and environmental activist
- Warren Silver, former Maine Supreme Judicial Court justice

Organizations

- Iron Workers Local 7
- Working Families Party (also endorsed Sweet and Russell)
Janet Mills

Local and state politicians

- Joseph E. Brennan, former governor of Maine (1979–1987), former US Representative for Maine's 1st congressional district (1987–1991), former Maine Attorney General (1975-1979), nominee for Governor in 1990 and 1994, nominee for US Senate in 1996, candidate for Governor in 1974
- Lynn Bromley, former state senator
- Emily Cain, former state senator, nominee for ME-02 in 2014 and 2016, executive director of EMILY's List
- Margaret Craven, former state senator
- Jerry Davis, former state representative
- Lois Galgay Reckitt, state representative
- Dawn Hill, state senator
- Helen Rankin, former state representative

Other individuals

- Maura Healey, Massachusetts Attorney General
- Nick Wilson, executive director, Maine Gun Safety Coalition

Organizations

- Emily's List
Diane Russell

Organizations

- Working Families Party (also endorsed Sweet and Eves)
Betsy Sweet

Local and state politicians

- Everett "Brownie" Carson, state senator
- Clare Davitt, Bangor City Councillor
- Beth Edmonds, former President of the Maine Senate
- Karen Kusiak, former state representative, candidate for State Senate
- Dale McCormick, former Maine State Treasurer, former state senator, candidate for ME-01 in 1996
- Ethan Strimling, Mayor of Portland, former state senator, candidate for ME-01 in 2008
- Mike Sylvester, state representative
- Charlotte Warren, state representative
- Barb Wood, former Portland City Councillor, vice president of the Equality Maine Foundation

Other individuals

- Ben Cohen, cofounder, Ben & Jerry's
- Cenk Uygur, journalist, host of The Young Turks
- Marianne Williamson, writer

Organizations

- Southern Maine Democratic Socialists of America
- Working Families Party (also endorsed Eves and Russell)

=== Polling ===
Poll source	Date(s) administered	Sample size	Margin of error	RCV round	Adam Cote	Donna Dion	Mark Dion	Mark Eves	Janet Mills	Diane Russell	Betsy Sweet	Undecided
SurveyUSA	April 26 – May 1, 2018	649	± 4.2%	Round 1	9%	2%	10%	16%	32%	4%	5%	24%
SurveyUSA	April 26 – May 1, 2018	649	± 4.2%	Round 2	13%	–	13%	20%	42%	5%	6%	
SurveyUSA	April 26 – May 1, 2018	649	± 4.2%	Round 3	13%	–	13%	22%	43%	–	8%	
SurveyUSA	April 26 – May 1, 2018	649	± 4.2%	Round 4	14%	–	15%	24%	48%	–	–	
SurveyUSA	April 26 – May 1, 2018	649	± 4.2%	Round 5	–	–	19%	26%	55%	–	–	

=== Results ===
Results by county Mills: 20–30%; 30–40%; 40–50%; 50–60%; 60–70%; Cote: 30–40%

Democratic primary results
Party	Candidate	Round 1			Round 2			Round 3			Round 4	
Party	Candidate	Votes	%	Transfer	Votes	%	Transfer	Votes	%	Transfer	Votes	%
Democratic	Janet Mills	41,735	33.1%	+ 2,307	44,042	35.5%	+ 5,903	49,945	40.8%	+ 13,439	63,384	54.1%
Democratic	Adam Cote	35,478	28.1%	+ 2,065	37,543	30.2%	+ 5,080	42,623	34.8%	+ 11,243	53,866	45.9%
Democratic	Betsy Sweet	20,767	16.5%	+ 2,220	22,987	18.5%	+ 6,957	29,944	24.4%	29,944	Eliminated	
Democratic	Mark Eves	17,887	14.2%	+ 1,634	19,521	15.7%	19,521	Eliminated				
Democratic	Mark Dion	5,200	4.1%	5,200	Eliminated							
Democratic	Diane Russell	2,728	2.2%	2,728	Eliminated							
Democratic	Donna Dion	1,596	1.3%	1,596	Eliminated							
Democratic	Write-ins	748	0.6%	748	Eliminated							
Continuing ballots		126,139	100.0		124,093	98.4		122,512	97.1		117,250	93.0
Exhausted ballots		–		+ 2,046	2,046	1.6	+ 1,581	3,627	2.9	+ 5,262	8,889	7.0
Total votes		126,139	100.0		126,139	100.0		126,139	100.0		126,139	100.0

== Green Independent primary ==
=== Candidates ===
==== Withdrawn ====
- Jay Parker Dresser, candidate for ME-02 in 2016
- Betsy Marsano, activist

== Libertarian primary ==
=== Candidates ===
==== Withdrawn ====
- Gilbert P. Doughty
- Richard Light

== Independents ==
=== Candidates ===
==== Declared ====
- Kenneth A. Capron, perennial candidate, systems analyst and fraud investigator(write-in candidate)
- Terry Hayes, Maine State Treasurer
- John Jenkins, former mayor of Lewiston, former mayor of Auburn and former Democratic state senator(write-in candidate)

Capron and Jenkins failed to qualify for the ballot, but continued their campaigns as write-in candidates.

==== Withdrawn ====
- Ethan Alcorn, businessman (did not qualify)
- Alan Caron, president and CEO of Envision Maine (endorsed Mills)
- Aaron D. Chadbourne, writer and activist (write-in candidate, endorsed Moody)

==== Failed to make ballot ====
- Karmo Sanders, actress

==== Declined ====
- Eliot Cutler, attorney and candidate for governor in 2010 and 2014
- Angus King, U.S. Senator and former governor (running for re-election)
- Peter Vigue, businessman
- Richard G. Woodbury, former state senator

== General election ==
After the primaries, most prediction models had the race as a tossup, noting Paul LePage's two victories and Hillary Clinton's narrow margin of victory in the state in the 2016 presidential election. Others considered it to be a pick-up opportunity for the Democrats. Both Moody and Mills received the backing of outside money, with one PAC spending in excess of $1 million on television advertising in the state to support Mills's candidacy.

On October 12, Jonathan Martin of The New York Times published an article detailing a sex discrimination complaint filed against Moody and his business in 2006, which Moody settled for $20,000, resulting in the complaint being withdrawn. The complaint alleged that Moody went to the residence of a female employee and fired her for having a child just days after delivering the child via an emergency caesarean section. Moody denied the allegation through a spokesperson and later on Twitter.

Though the first poll of the race saw Mills and Moody tied for first place with Hayes and Caron lagging behind, by the end of October, four different polls were released, each showing Mills with an eight-point lead over Moody. FiveThirtyEight declared the race "Likely D" when its gubernatorial projections were released in October, though other prediction models maintained the race as a tossup.

On October 29, in a press conference at the main branch of the Portland Public Library, Caron dropped out of the race and endorsed Mills. His name remained on the ballot, but any votes cast for him were regarded as blank.

Shortly before 10 pm on election night, Hayes conceded the race. At 12:15 am on November 7, Moody conceded the race to Mills, and shortly thereafter Mills declared victory at Democratic headquarters in Portland. Mills became the first Maine gubernatorial candidate to receive more than 300,000 votes in a single election. Mills also became the first Maine gubernatorial candidate to win a majority of the vote since Angus King won nearly 59% of the vote in his re-election bid in 1998, and became the first candidate to win a majority of the popular vote for a first term since Kenneth M. Curtis defeated incumbent governor John H. Reed in 1966, though Curtis and Reed were the only candidates in that race.

The general election used plurality voting, not ranked-choice voting.

=== Predictions ===
Source	Ranking	As of
The Cook Political Report	Tossup	October 26, 2018
The Washington Post	Tossup	November 5, 2018
FiveThirtyEight	Likely D (flip)	November 5, 2018
Rothenberg Political Report	Tilt D (flip)	November 1, 2018
Sabato's Crystal Ball	Lean D (flip)	November 5, 2018
RealClearPolitics	Lean D (flip)	November 4, 2018
Daily Kos	Tossup	November 5, 2018
Fox News (Note: The Fox News Midterm Power Rankings uniquely does not contain a category for Safe/Solid races)	Tossup	November 5, 2018
Politico	Tossup	November 5, 2018
Governing	Tossup	November 5, 2018

=== Endorsements ===
- Endorsements in **bold** were made after the primaries on June 12, 2018.
Terry Hayes (I)

Local and state politicians

- Kent Ackley, state representative (I–Monmouth)
- Linda Baker, former state senator (R–Topsham)
- Kevin Battle, state representative (I–South Portland)
- Bobbi Beavers, former state representative (D–South Berwick)
- Kerri Bickford, former state representative (R–Topsham)
- Andrea Boland, former state representative (D–Sanford)
- Owen Casas, state representative (I–Rockport)
- Ralph Chapman, state representative (G–Brooksville)
- David Cotta, former state representative (R–China)
- Dean Cray, former state representative (R–Palmyra)
- Dennis Damon, former state representative (D–Trenton)
- Leslie Fossel, former state representative (R–Alna)
- Martin Grohman, state representative (I–Biddeford)
- Denise Harlow, state representative (I–Portland)
- Norm Higgins, state representative (I–Dover-Foxcroft)
- Bryan Kaenrath, former state representative (D–South Portland)
- Gary Knight, former state representative (R–Livermore Falls)
- Leila J. Percy, former state representative (D–Phippsburg)
- Stanley Short, former state representative (D–Pittsfield)
- Ed Suslovic, former Mayor of Portland and former state representative (D–Portland)
- Windol Weaver, former state representative (R–York)

Individuals

- Eliot Cutler, attorney and independent candidate for governor (2010 and 2014)

Organizations

- Unite America
Janet Mills (D)

National politicians

- **Joe Biden, former Vice President of the United States**
- **Susan Rice, former United States Ambassador to the United Nations and former National Security Advisor**

Local and state politicians

- **Justin Alfond, former President of the Maine Senate**
- Joseph E. Brennan, former governor of Maine (1979–1987), former US representative for Maine's 1st congressional district (1987–1991), former Maine Attorney General (1975–1979), nominee for governor in 1990 and 1994, nominee for US Senate in 1996, candidate for governor in 1974
- Lynn Bromley, former state senator
- Emily Cain, former state senator, nominee for ME-02 in 2014 and 2016, executive director of EMILY's List
- **Alan Caron, 2018 gubernatorial candidate**
- **Adam Cote, 2018 gubernatorial candidate**
- Margaret Craven, former state senator
- Jerry Davis, former state representative
- **Mark Dion, state senator and 2018 gubernatorial candidate**
- **Mark Eves, former Speaker of the Maine House of Representatives and 2018 gubernatorial candidate**
- Lois Galgay Reckitt, state representative
- **Drew Gattine**, state representative
- Dawn Hill, state senator
- **Donna Loring**, former tribal representative of the Penobscot Nation
- Helen Rankin, former state representative
- **Diane Russell, former state representative and 2018 gubernatorial candidate**
- **Lucas St. Clair, businessman, conservationist and candidate for Maine's 2nd congressional district in 2018**
- **Betsy Sweet, former director of the Maine Women's Lobby and 2018 gubernatorial candidate**
- **Spencer Thibodeau, Portland City Councillor**
- **Charlotte Warren, state representative**

Other individuals

- **David Farmer, political consultant and journalist**
- Maura Healey, Massachusetts Attorney General
- **Jay Inslee, Governor of Washington, chairman of the Democratic Governors Association**
- Nick Wilson, executive director, Maine Gun Safety Coalition
- Monica Wood, author

Organizations

- Emily's List
- **EqualityMaine**
- **Human Rights Campaign**
- **League of Conservation Voters**
- **Planned Parenthood**
- **Sierra Club**

Trade unions

- **AFL–CIO**
- **Maine Education Association**

Media

- Bangor Daily News
- The Boston Globe
- Kennebec Journal
- Portland Phoenix
- Portland Press Herald
Shawn Moody (R)

Local and state politicians

- Rick Bennett, former President of the Maine Senate, former chair of the Maine Republican Party
- **Ken Fredette, state house minority leader, 2018 gubernatorial candidate**
- **Paul LePage, Governor of Maine**
- **Garrett Mason, state senate majority leader, 2018 gubernatorial candidate**
- **Mary Mayhew, former director the Maine Department of Health and Human Services**
- **Mike Thibodeau, President of the Maine Senate, 2018 gubernatorial candidate**

Other individuals

- Adrienne Bennett, former spokesperson for Governor Paul LePage
- Aaron D. Chadbourne, writer and activist, former write-in candidate for governor
- **Matt DiBenedetto, NASCAR driver**
- Ann LePage, first lady of Maine

Organizations

- **Associated Builders and Contractors of Maine**
- **Sportman's Alliance of Maine**

=== Debates ===
Dates	Location	Mills	Moody	Hayes	Caron	Link
October 10, 2018	Portland, Maine	Participant	Participant	Participant	Participant	Full debate - C-SPAN
October 25, 2018	Augusta, Maine	Participant	Participant	Participant	Participant	Full debate - C-SPAN
November 1, 2018	Bangor, Maine	Participant	Participant	Participant	Participant	Full debate - PBS

=== Polling ===
Poll source	Date(s) administered	Sample size	Margin of error	Shawn Moody (R)	Janet Mills (D)	Terry Hayes (I)	Alan Caron (I)	Other	Undecided
Slingshot Strategies (I-Hayes)	November 1, 2018	518	–	38%	55%	7%	–	–	–
Emerson College	October 27–29, 2018	883	± 3.5%	42%	50%	–	–	5%	4%
Pan Atlantic Research	October 1–7, 2018	500	± 4.4%	36%	44%	8%	2%	–	10%
Change Research	September 30 – October 1, 2018	801	–	44%	52%	–	–	–	–
Slingshot Strategies (I-Hayes)	September 26–30, 2018	600	–	33%	41%	10%	2%	0%	13%
Suffolk University	August 2–6, 2018	500	± 4.4%	**39%**	39%	4%	3%	–	16%

Hypothetical polling

if ranked-choice voting were used

Poll source	Date(s) administered	Sample size	Margin of error	Shawn Moody (R)	Janet Mills (D)	Terry Hayes (I)	Alan Caron (I)	Undecided
Slingshot Strategies (I-Hayes)	November 1, 2018	518	–	37%	**49%**	11%	–	3%
Slingshot Strategies (I-Hayes)	September 26–30, 2018	600	–	42%	**45%**	9%	4%	–

=== Results ===
Maine gubernatorial election, 2018
Party	Candidate	Votes	%	±%
**Democratic**	**Janet Mills**	**320,962**	**50.89%**	**+7.52%**
Republican	Shawn Moody	272,311	43.18%	−5.01%
Independent	Terry Hayes	37,268	5.91%	N/A
Write-in		126	0.02%	N/A
Total votes		**630,667**	**100.00%**	N/A
Democratic **gain** from Republican				

==== By county ====
	Janet Mills (Democratic)		Shawn Moody (Republican)		Terry Hayes (Independent)		Margin		Total
County	Votes	%	Votes	%	Votes	%	Votes	%	Votes
Androscoggin	19,801	43.96%	21,903	48.63%	3,337	7.41%	-2,102	-4.67%	45,041
Aroostook	10,360	38.23%	14,498	53.51%	2,238	8.26%	-4,138	-15.28%	27,096
Cumberland	95,346	61.19%	53,088	34.07%	7,373	4.73%	42,258	27.12%	155,807
Franklin	7,083	50.32%	6,254	44.43%	738	5.24%	829	5.89%	14,075
Hancock	15,228	54.13%	11,356	40.37%	1,549	5.51%	3,872	13.76%	28,133
Kennebec	26,777	47.86%	25,752	46.03%	3,422	6.12%	1,025	1.83%	55,951
Knox	11,691	57.39%	7,694	37.77%	985	4.84%	3,997	19.62%	20,370
Lincoln	9,676	50.88%	8,324	43.77%	1,019	5.36%	1,352	7.11%	19,019
Oxford	10,510	41.06%	12,342	48.22%	2,742	10.71%	-1,832	-7.16%	25,594
Penobscot	29,004	45.17%	31,572	49.17%	3,640	5.67%	-2,568	-4.00%	64,216
Piscataquis	2,887	38.70%	4,109	55.08%	464	6.22%	-1,222	-16.38%	7,460
Sagadahoc	10,152	53.22%	7,714	40.44%	1,210	6.34%	2,438	12.78%	19,076
Somerset	8,524	41.03%	11,048	53.18%	1,204	5.80%	-2,524	-12.15%	20,776
Waldo	10,109	51.61%	8,397	42.87%	1,083	5.53%	1,712	8.74%	19,589
Washington	5,736	43.99%	6,533	50.10%	770	5.91%	-797	-6.11%	13,039
York	48,078	50.45%	41,727	43.79%	5,494	5.77%	6,351	6.66%	95,299

Counties that flipped from Republican to Democratic

- Franklin (largest town: Farmington)
- Hancock (largest town: Ellsworth)
- Kennebec (largest town: Augusta)
- Lincoln (largest town: Waldoboro)
- Sagadahoc (largest town: Bath)
- Waldo (largest town: Belfast)
- York (largest town: Biddeford)

==== By congressional district ====
Mills won one of the two congressional districts. Moody won the other, which elected a Democrat.

District	Moody	Mills	Hayes	Representative
1st	39%	**56%**	5%	Chellie Pingree
2nd	**48%**	45%	7%	Jared Golden

== See also ==
- 2018 United States gubernatorial elections
