= 2014 United States House of Representatives elections in Maine =

- November 4, 2014

All 2 Maine seats to the United States House of Representatives
	Majority party	Minority party	Third party
Party	Democratic	Republican	Independent
Last election	2	0	0
Seats won	1	1	0
Seat change	▼1	▲1	0
Popular vote	305,230	228,059	59,058
Percentage	51.53%	38.50%	9.97%
Swing	▼10.13%	▲0.16%	▲9.97%

Democratic
40–50%
50–60%
60–70%
Republican
40–50%
50–60%

The 2014 United States House of Representatives elections in Maine were held on Tuesday, November 4, 2014, to elect the two U.S. representatives from the state of Maine, one from each of the state's two congressional districts. The elections coincided with the elections of other federal and state offices, including governor of Maine and United States Senate. The primary elections were held on June 10, 2014.

This election marked the first time since 1994 that Maine elected a Republican into the House of Representatives.

== Overview ==
Results of the 2014 United States House of Representatives elections in Maine by district:

District	Democratic		Republican		Others		Total		Result
District	Votes	%	Votes	%	Votes	%	Votes	%	Result
District 1	186,674	60.43%	94,751	30.68%	27,473	8.89%	308,898	100.0%	Democratic hold
District 2	118,568	41.83%	133,320	47.03%	31,585	11.14%	283,473	100.0%	Republican gain
Total	305,242	51.53%	228,071	38.50%	59,058	9.97%	592,371	100.0%	

== District 1 ==
2014 Maine's 1st congressional district election
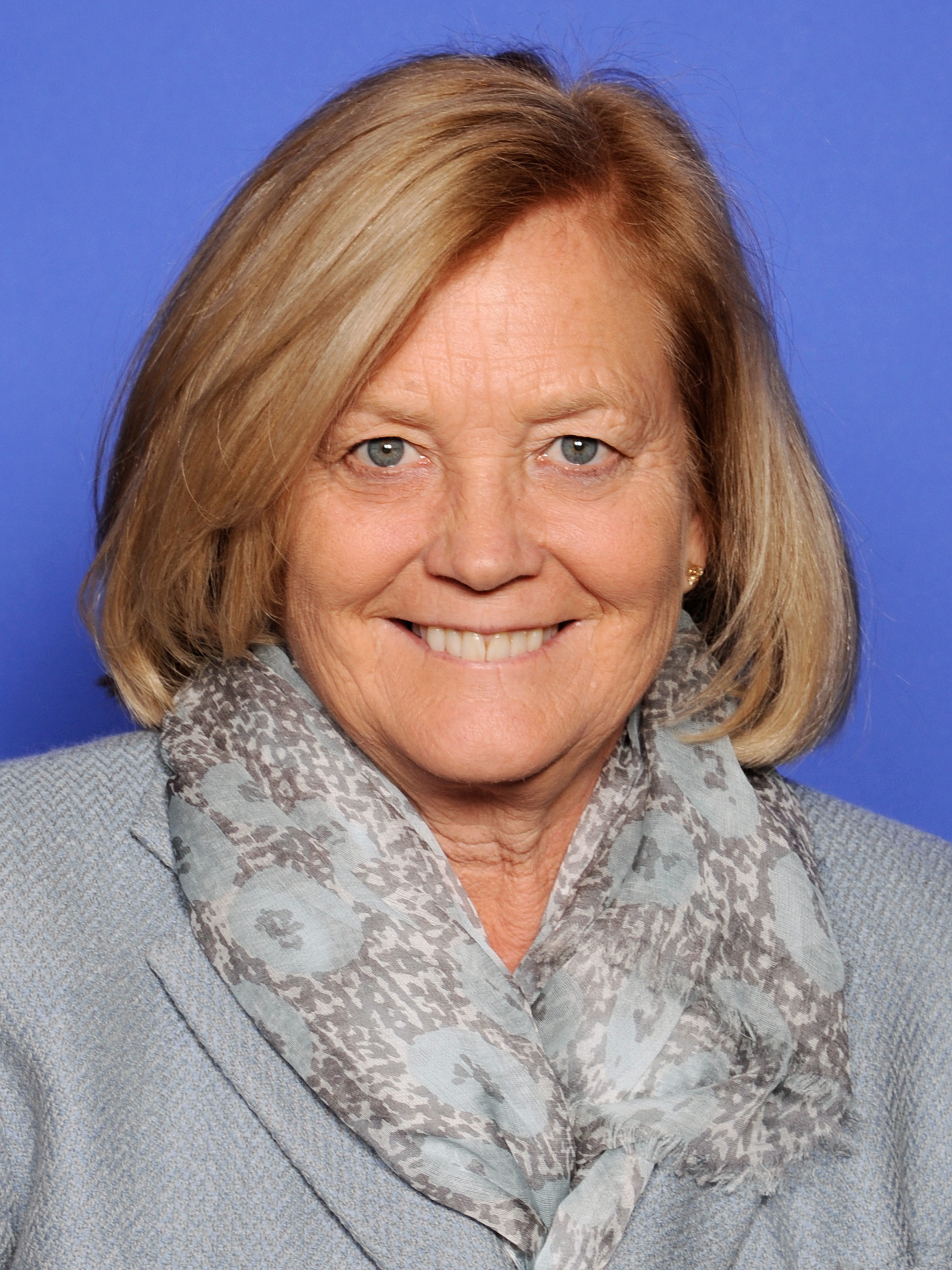

Nominee	Chellie Pingree	Isaac Misiuk	Richard P. Murphy
Party	Democratic	Republican	Independent
Popular vote	186,674	94,751	27,410
Percentage	60.4%	30.7%	8.9%
- County results Pingree: 50–60% 60–70%
U.S. Representative before election
Chellie Pingree
Democratic
Elected U.S. Representative
Chellie Pingree
Democratic

The 1st district includes covers the southern coastal area of the state, including all of Cumberland, Knox, Lincoln, Sagadahoc and York counties and most of Kennebec County. Located within the district are the cities of Portland, Augusta, Brunswick and Saco. The incumbent Democrat Chellie Pingree, who had represented the district since 2009, ran for re-election. She was re-elected with 65% of the vote in 2012, and the district had a PVI of D+9.

=== Democratic primary ===
==== Candidates ====
===== Nominee =====
- Chellie Pingree, incumbent U.S. representative

==== Results ====
Democratic primary results
Party	Candidate	Votes	%
Democratic	Chellie Pingree (incumbent)	30,950	100.0
Total votes		30,950	100.0

=== Republican primary ===
==== Candidates ====
===== Nominee =====
- Isaac Misiuk, former University of Southern Maine College Republicans president

===== Declined =====
- Meredith Strang Burgess, former state representative

==== Results ====
Republican primary results
Party	Candidate	Votes	%
Republican	Isaac Misiuk	17,061	100.0
Total votes		17,061	100.0

=== Independents ===
==== Candidates ====
===== Declared =====
- Richard Murphy, Maine National Guardsman

=== General election ===
==== Debates ====
2014 Maine's 1st congressional district debates
No.	Date	Host	Moderator	Link	Democratic	Republican	Independent
Key: P Participant A Absent N Not invited I Invited W Withdrawn							
Key: P Participant A Absent N Not invited I Invited W Withdrawn					Chellie Pingree	Isaac Misiuk	Richard Murphy
1	Oct. 6, 2014	Bangor Daily News; WGME-TV; WPFO	Gregg Lagerquist		P	P	P
1	Oct. 9, 2014	Maine Public Broadcasting Network	Jennifer Rooks		P	P	P

==== Endorsements ====
Chellie Pingree (D)

Newspapers

- Bangor Daily News
Issac Misiuk (R)

U.S. senators

- Susan Collins, U.S. senator (R-ME)

State officials

- Paul LePage, governor of Maine
Declined to endorse

Organizations

- Sportsman's Alliance of Maine

Newspapers

- MaineToday Media newspapers

==== Polling ====
Poll source	Date(s) administered	Sample size	Margin of error	Chellie Pingree (D)	Issac Misiuk (R)	Richard Murphy (I)	Other	Undecided
Maine People's Resource Center	October 31–November 2, 2014	419	± 4.79%	56%	30%	7%	—	7%
Pan Atlantic/SMS Group	October 15–21, 2014	206	± 6.8%	62%	18%	6%	—	14%
University of New Hampshire	October 15–21, 2014	297	± 5.5%	57%	19%	10%	—	13%
Critical Insights	September 24–30, 2014	311	± 4%	53%	19%	10%	—	17%
Pan Atlantic SMS	September 23–29, 2014	400	± 4.9%	51%	9%	10%	—	30%
University of New Hampshire	September 18–25, 2014	220	± 6.2%	66%	13%	0%	4%	17%
University of New Hampshire	June 12–18, 2014	305	± 6.5%	56%	22%	—	2%	20%

==== Predictions ====
Source	Ranking	As of
The Cook Political Report	Safe D	November 3, 2014
Rothenberg	Safe D	October 24, 2014
Sabato's Crystal Ball	Safe D	October 30, 2014
RCP	Safe D	November 2, 2014
Daily Kos Elections	Safe D	November 4, 2014

==== Results ====
Maine's 1st congressional district, 2014
Party	Candidate	Votes	%
Democratic	Chellie Pingree (incumbent)	186,674	60.4
Republican	Isaac J. Misiuk	94,751	30.7
Independent	Richard P. Murphy	27,410	8.9
n/a	Write-ins	63	0.0
Total votes		308,898	100.0
Democratic hold			

== District 2 ==
2014 Maine's 2nd congressional district election
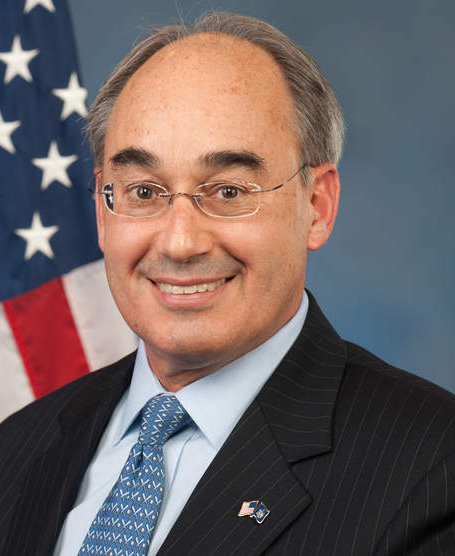

Nominee	Bruce Poliquin	Emily Cain	Blaine Richardson
Party	Republican	Democratic	Independent
Popular vote	133,308	118,556	31,336
Percentage	47.0%	41.8%	11.1%
- County results Poliquin: 40–50% 50%–60% Cain: 40–50% 50%–60%
U.S. Representative before election
Mike Michaud
Democratic
Elected U.S. Representative
Bruce Poliquin
Republican

The 2nd district covers 27,326 square miles (70,770 km^{2}), comprising nearly 80% of the state's total land area. It is the largest district east of the Mississippi River and the 24th-largest overall. It is the second-most rural district in the United States, with 72.11% of its population in rural areas, behind only Kentucky's 5th congressional district. It includes most of the land area north of the Portland and Augusta metropolitan areas, including the cities of Bangor, Lewiston, Auburn and Presque Isle. The incumbent Democrat Mike Michaud, who had represented the district since 2003, did not seek re-election, and was selected as the Democratic nominee for governor of Maine in the 2014 election. He was re-elected with 58% of the vote in 2012, and the district had a PVI of D+2.

=== Democratic primary ===
==== Candidates ====
===== Nominee =====
- Emily Cain, state senator

===== Eliminated in primary =====
- Troy Jackson, majority leader of the Maine Senate

===== Withdrew =====
- Alden Smith, Navy reservist

===== Declined =====
- Joe Baldacci, Bangor city councilor
- John Baldacci, former governor and former U.S. representative
- Matthew Dunlap, Secretary of State of Maine
- James Howaniec, attorney, former mayor of Lewiston and candidate for this seat in 1994
- Jeff McCabe, assistant majority leader of the Maine House of Representatives
- Mike Michaud, incumbent U.S. representative (running for governor)

==== Endorsements ====
Troy Dale Jackson

State legislators

- Jeffrey Evangelos, state representative

Labor unions

- Local 6 (at Bath Iron Works)
- Maine AFL–CIO
- Maine AFSCME Local 2011
- Maine Teamsters
- United Auto Workers Region 9A

Individuals

- Thomas Steinbeck, son of author John Steinbeck

==== Polling ====
Poll source	Date(s) administered	Sample size	Margin of error	Emily Cain	Troy Dale Jackson	Undecided
Public Policy Polling	June 2–3, 2014	810	±3.4%	60%	25%	15%

Hypothetical polling

Poll source	Date(s) administered	Sample size	Margin of error	Joe Baldacci	Emily Cain	Matthew Dunlap	Troy Dale Jackson	Jeff McCabe	Janet Mills	Alden Smith	Undecided
Public Policy Polling	August 23–25, 2013	561	± 4.1%	31%	22%	—	15%	—	—	2%	30%
Public Policy Polling	June 26–27, 2013	633	± 3.9%	19%	18%	8%	9%	3%	15%	—	28%

==== Results ====
Democratic primary results
Party	Candidate	Votes	%
Democratic	Emily Cain	19,906	71.0
Democratic	Troy Dale Jackson	8,116	29.0
Total votes		28,022	100.0

=== Republican primary ===
==== Candidates ====
===== Nominee =====
- Bruce Poliquin, former state treasurer of Maine and candidate for the U.S. Senate in 2012

===== Eliminated in primary =====
- Kevin Raye, former president of the Maine Senate and nominee for the seat in 2002 and 2012

===== Withdrew =====
- Blaine Richardson, United States Navy veteran, and candidate for this seat in 2012 (unenrolled as a Republican, running as an independent)
- Richard Rosen, director of the Maine Office of Policy and Management and former state senator
- Alexander Willette, assistant minority leader of the Maine House of Representatives

===== Declined =====
- Kenneth Fredette, minority leader of the Maine House of Representatives
- Jonathan LaBonte, mayor of Auburn
- Paul LePage, governor of Maine (running for re-election)
- Garrett Mason, state senator
- Debra Plowman, former state senator
- Joshua Tardy, former minority leader of the Maine House of Representatives
- Michael Thibodeau, minority leader of the Maine Senate

==== Endorsements ====
Bruce Poliquin

U.S. senators

- Susan Collins, U.S. senator (R-ME) (for general election)

U.S. representatives

- John Boehner, speaker of the United States House of Representatives (R-OH) (for general election)

Organizations

- National Federation of Independent Business
- National Rifle Association - Political Victory Fund (for general election)
- ~~Republican Liberty Caucus~~ (rescinded on February 5, 2015, after the election)
Kevin Raye

State legislators

- Bernard Ayotte, state representative
- David Burns, state senator
- Dean Cray, state representative
- Jarrod Crockett, state representative
- Phil Curtis, former majority leader of the Maine House of Representatives
- Jim Donnelly, former Maine House Minority Leader
- Joyce Fitzpatrick, state representative
- Anita Haskell, state representative
- Brian Langley, state senator
- Joyce Maker, state representative
- Garrett Mason, state senator
- Carol McElwee, state representative
- Robert Nutting, state representative, former Speaker of the Maine House of Representatives
- Debra Plowman, former assistant majority leader of the Maine Senate
- Tom Saviello, state senator
- Roger Sherman, state senator
- Josh Tardy, former Maine House minority leader
- Edward Youngblood, state senator

Organizations

- Business Industry Political Action Committee
- National Rifle Association - Political Victory Fund (for primary)

Newspapers

- Bangor Daily News
Declined to endorse

State officials

- Paul LePage, governor of Maine

==== Polling ====
Poll source	Date(s) administered	Sample size	Margin of error	Bruce Poliquin	Kevin Raye	Blaine Richardson	Richard Rosen	Undecided
Public Opinion Strategies (R-Raye)	November 4–5, 2013	310	± 5.57%	18%	42%	3%	5%	32%

==== Results ====
Republican primary results
Party	Candidate	Votes	%
Republican	Bruce Poliquin	19,736	56.8
Republican	Kevin Raye	14,987	43.2
Total votes		34,723	100.0

=== Independents ===
==== Candidates ====
===== Declared =====
- Blaine Richardson, United States Navy veteran, and Republican candidate for the seat in 2012 (unenrolled as a Republican, running as an independent)

=== General election ===
==== Campaign ====
Bruce Poliquin resisted invitations to debates where Blaine Richardson would be present, including one sponsored by MPBN. Political observers stated this might have been due to Richardson's potential to split the conservative vote. Emily Cain expressed support for Richardson being present at debates and said she would only attend debates where both of the other candidates were present. A debate to be held on WMTW-TV was cancelled after Cain pulled out to protest Richardson not being invited. WMTW said they and their parent company, Hearst Television, had strict criteria for invitations to debates that Richardson did not meet. These criteria included holding large campaign events, fundraising, and performance in polling, all of which WMTW said were not met.

On August 29, Richardson revealed, and Poliquin's campaign confirmed, that Richardson had rejected a request from Poliquin to quit the race. A Poliquin spokesman stated the phone call was made because Richardson had "no chance" to win and seemed "more interested in working with Emily Cain to bash Bruce rather than have a discussion about the future". Richardson said he would stay in the race and he was "so fed up with the parties, both of them". He also said that Poliquin asking him to quit had been one of the biggest boosts for his campaign.

==== Debates ====
- Complete video of debate, October 16, 2014

==== Endorsements ====
Emily Cain (D)

U.S. senators

- Angus King, U.S. senator (I-ME)

State legislators

- Patrick Flood, Republican state senator, ranking Appropriations Committee member
- Sherry Huber, former state legislator, former candidate for governor

Labor unions

- AFL–CIO
- American Federation of Teachers
- International Brotherhood of Electrical Workers Local 104

Organizations

- EMILY's List
- EqualityMaine
- Planned Parenthood Maine Action Fund
- Sierra Club Maine

Newspapers

- Bangor Daily News (for primary and general)

Individuals

- Maj. Gen. (retired) John Libby, former head of the Maine National Guard and former commissioner of the Maine Department of Defense, Veterans, and Emergency Management
Declined to endorse

Organizations

- Sportsman's Alliance of Maine

Newspapers

- MaineToday Media newspapers

==== Polling ====
Poll source	Date(s) administered	Sample size	Margin of error	Emily Cain (D)	Bruce Poliquin (R)	Blaine Richardson (I)	Other	Undecided
Maine People's Resource Center	October 31–November 2, 2014	397	± 4.92%	42%	43%	10%	—	5%
Pan Atlantic/SMS Group	October 15–21, 2014	186	± 7%	39%	38%	8%	—	16%
University of New Hampshire	October 15–21, 2014	291	± 5.5%	40%	41%	8%	—	9%
Normington Petts (D-Cain)	October 15–16, 2014	400	± 4.9%	42%	34%	8%	—	16%
Critical Insights	September 24–30, 2014	295	± 4%	36%	41%	6%	—	16%
Pan Atlantic SMS	September 23–29, 2014	400	± 4.9%	36%	33%	6%	—	25%
University of New Hampshire	September 18–25, 2014	220	± 6.2%	30%	40%	3%	—	27%
Public Opinion Strategies (R-Poliquin)	August 17–19, 2014	400	± 4.9%	37%	33%	6%	—	24%
University of New Hampshire	June 12–18, 2014	222	± 6.5%	44%	39%	—	0%	17%
Public Opinion Strategies (R-Raye)	November 4–5, 2013	400	± 4.9%	37%	34%	—	—	29%

Hypothetical polling

Poll source	Date(s) administered	Sample size	Margin of error	Emily Cain (D)	Kevin Raye (R)	Undecided
Public Opinion Strategies^	November 4–5, 2013	400	± 4.9%	31%	45%	24%

Poll source	Date(s) administered	Sample size	Margin of error	Troy Dale Jackson (D)	Bruce Poliquin (R)	Undecided
Public Opinion Strategies^	November 4–5, 2013	400	± 4.9%	38%	33%	29%

Poll source	Date(s) administered	Sample size	Margin of error	Troy Dale Jackson (D)	Kevin Raye (R)	Undecided
Public Opinion Strategies^	November 4–5, 2013	400	± 4.9%	30%	45%	25%

==== Predictions ====
Source	Ranking	As of
The Cook Political Report	Lean D	November 3, 2014
Rothenberg	Lean D	October 24, 2014
Sabato's Crystal Ball	Lean D	October 30, 2014
RCP	Tossup	November 2, 2014
Daily Kos Elections	Lean D	November 4, 2014

==== Results ====
Maine's 2nd congressional district, 2014
Party	Candidate	Votes	%
Republican	Bruce Poliquin	133,308	47.0
Democratic	Emily Cain	118,556	41.8
Independent	Blaine Richardson	31,336	11.1
n/a	Write-ins	248	0.1
Total votes		283,448	100.0
Republican gain from Democratic			

== See also ==
- 2014 United States House of Representatives elections
- 2014 United States elections
