= Terry Hayes (politician) =

American politician (born 1958)

51st Treasurer of Maine
- In office January 6, 2015 – January 2, 2019
- Governor: Paul LePage
- Preceded by: Neria Douglass
- Succeeded by: Henry Beck

Member of the Maine House of Representatives from the 94th district
- In office 2006–2014
- Preceded by: Bruce Hanley
- Succeeded by: Joan Welsh

Personal details
- Born: Teresea M. Hayes; May 5, 1958 (age 68)
- Party: Independent (2014–present)
- Other political affiliations: Democratic (before 2014)
- Education: Bowdoin College (BA); Thomas College (MBA)

Teresea M. Hayes (born May 5, 1958) is an American politician from Maine who served as the Maine State Treasurer and a candidate for Governor of Maine in 2018. A political independent, Hayes represented part of Oxford County, Maine, including her residence in Buckfield, Maine, as a Democrat from 2006 to 2014. She was unable to seek re-election to the Maine House of Representatives in 2014 due to term-limits.

Following Hayes' 2010 re-election, she was named Assistant Minority Leader of the House Democrats. In November 2012, Hayes won a closely contested election by just 42 votes over her Republican opponent.

Hayes earned a B.A. in government from Bowdoin College in 1980. From 1991 to 2004, Hayes served on the MSAD 39 (Buckfield, Hartford, Sumner) School Board, including a stint as chair. She earned her MBA from Thomas College in Waterville, Maine in May 2014.

In 2014, Hayes endorsed unenrolled candidate for governor Eliot Cutler.

On December 3, 2014, Hayes was nominated by legislative Republicans to be State Treasurer of Maine, and she defeated the Democratic incumbent, Neria Douglass due to the support of Republicans and a minority of Democrats. She is the first independent to hold the office. Hayes has said one of her goals as treasurer is to create an online tool to allow the public to view and track how state bond money is spent, for greater transparency.

Hayes announced on April 14, 2017, that she has filed to run for Governor of Maine in 2018, stating she would seek to create a "collaborative" policy arena as opposed to what she sees as the current "conflict-centered" one. If elected, she would have been the first state treasurer to win the governor's office since 1889 when Edwin C. Burleigh was governor. She filed as a taxpayer-funded "Clean Elections" candidate.

Hayes finished third in the gubernatorial race, behind Democrat Janet Mills and Republican Shawn Moody. She received 37,268 votes, or 5.9%, in what was the worst showing for a major independent Maine gubernatorial candidate since John Michael's 2.1% in 2002.

After the election, the new Democratic-controlled Maine Legislature did not re-elect Hayes as State Treasurer, instead electing Democrat Henry Beck.

Political offices
| Preceded by Neria Douglass | Treasurer of Maine; 2015–2019 | Succeeded by Henry Beck |
