= 2014 Maine gubernatorial election =

- November 4, 2014
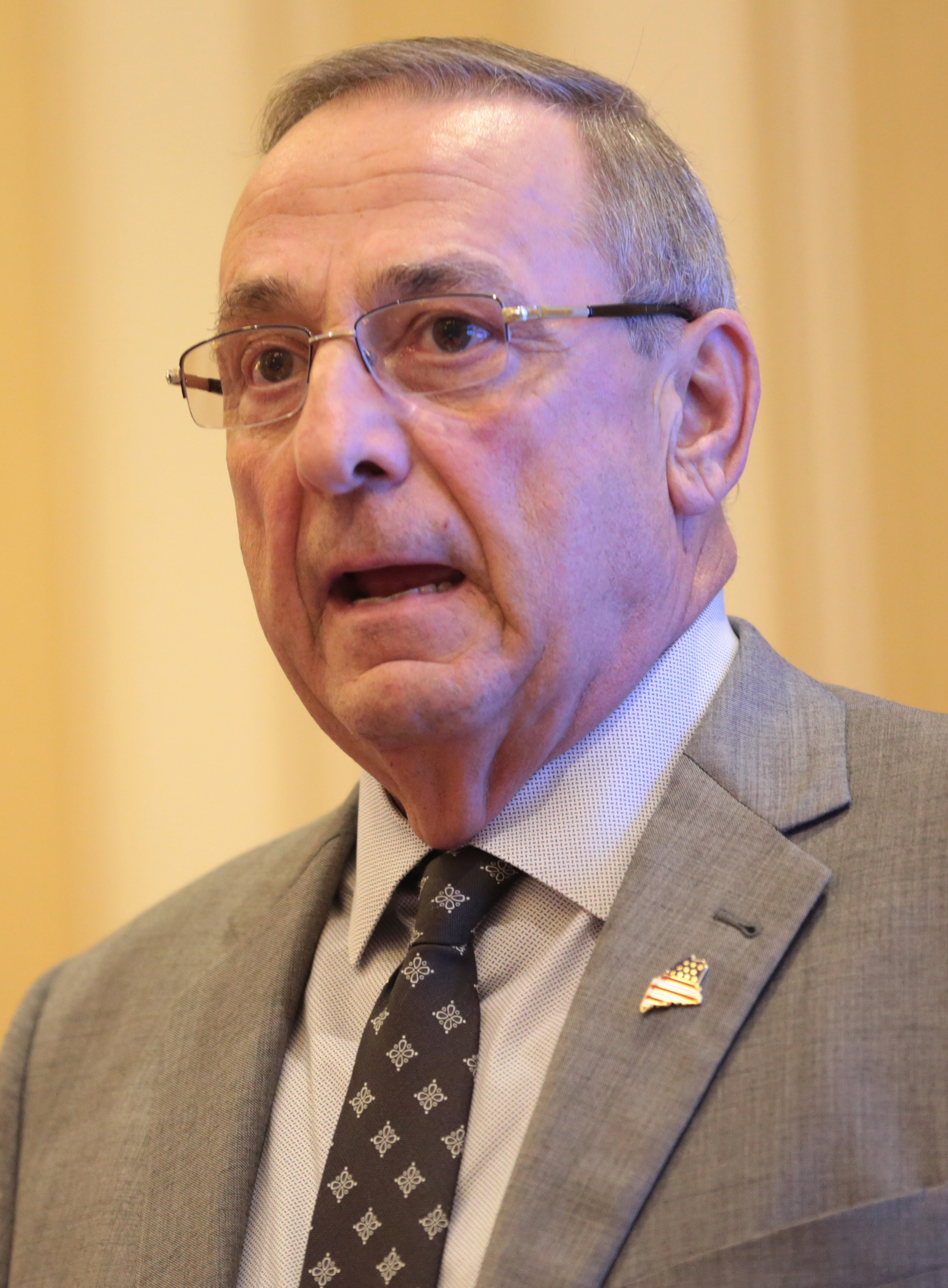

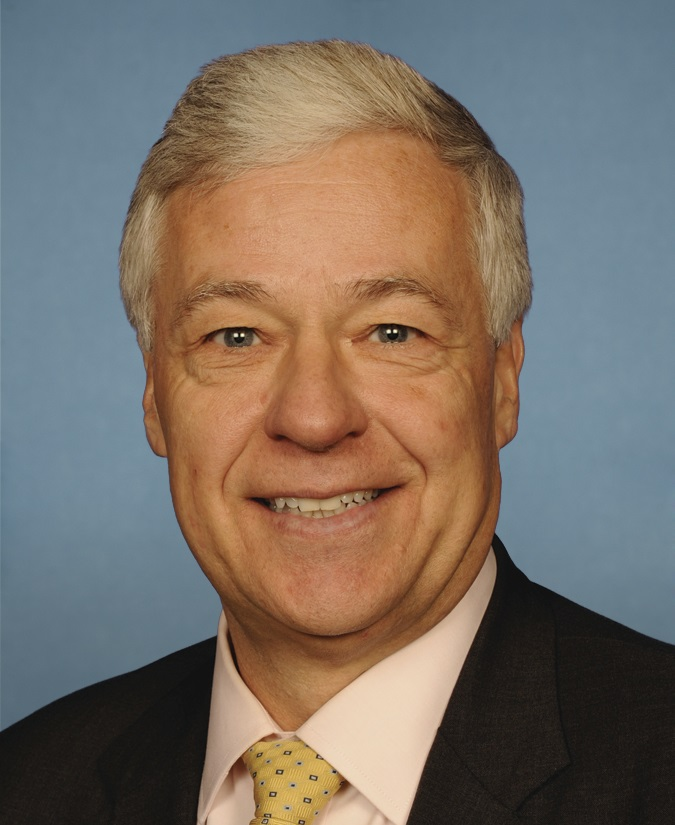

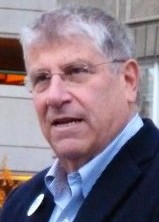
Nominee	Paul LePage	Mike Michaud	Eliot Cutler
Party	Republican	Democratic	Independent
Popular vote	294,533	265,125	51,518
Percentage	48.18%	43.37%	8.43%
- LePage: 40–50% 50–60% 60–70% 70–80% 80–90% >90% Michaud: 30–40% 40–50% 50–60% 60–70% 70–80% 80–90% >90% Tie
Governor before election
Paul LePage
Republican
Elected Governor
Paul LePage
Republican

The 2014 Maine gubernatorial election took place on November 4, 2014, to elect the governor of Maine. Incumbent Republican Governor Paul LePage won election to a second term, defeating Democratic nominee Mike Michaud, the U.S. representative from Maine's 2nd congressional district, and independent Eliot Cutler, an attorney and second-place finisher from the 2010 gubernatorial election. This was one of nine Republican-held governorships up for election in a state that Barack Obama won in the 2012 presidential election. This is currently the most recent election that Maine elected a Republican governor. Primary elections were held on June 10, 2014.

LePage was initially considered vulnerable in this race, due to persistent approval ratings below 50%. The consensus among The Cook Political Report, Governing and The Rothenberg Political Report was that the race was a "tossup" and Daily Kos Elections and Sabato's Crystal Ball rated the race as "lean Democratic". On election day, LePage won the election in what was considered a minor upset.

As of 2026, this is the last time York, Sagadahoc, Lincoln, Kennebec, Waldo and Hancock counties did not vote for the Democratic gubernatorial nominee.

== Background ==
After a close three-way election in 2010, Republican Paul LePage, the mayor of Waterville, was elected governor with 38% of the vote. He beat independent candidate Eliot Cutler, who won 36%, and Democrat Libby Mitchell, the president of the Maine Senate, who won 19%. Republican gubernatorial nominees in Maine have failed to win a majority of the vote in 12 consecutive cycles over the last 50+ years – the longest such GOP streak in the nation. No governor has been popularly elected with less than 40 percent of the vote in two consecutive cycles in U.S. history.

== Republican primary ==
=== Candidates ===
==== Declared ====
- Paul LePage, incumbent governor

=== Polling ===
Hypothetical polling

Who should challenge LePage in a primary?

Poll source	Date(s) administered	Sample size	Margin of error	Phil Harriman	Roger Katz	Peter Mills	Bruce Poliquin	Peter Vigue	Carol Weston	Other/ Undecided
Pan Atlantic SMS	November 25–30, 2013	261	± ?%	7.4%	5.1%	8.3%	6.6%	15.3%	6.9%	50.4%

=== Results ===
Republican primary results
Party	Candidate	Votes	%
Republican	Paul LePage (incumbent)	50,856	81.61
	Blank ballots	11,457	18.39
Total votes		62,313	100

== Democratic primary ==
=== Candidates ===
==== Declared ====
- Mike Michaud, U.S. representative

==== Withdrew ====
- David Slagger, former Maliseet representative to the Maine House of Representatives (switched parties to the Maine Green Independent Party, then unenrolled)
- Steve Woods, businessman, chairman of the Yarmouth Town Council and independent candidate for the U.S. Senate in 2012 (endorsed Michaud)

==== Declined ====
- Justin Alfond, president of the Maine Senate
- John Baldacci, former governor
- Emily Cain, state senator (running for ME-02)
- Matthew Dunlap, secretary of state of Maine
- Mark Eves, speaker of the Maine House of Representatives
- Jeremy Fischer, former state representative
- Janet T. Mills, Maine attorney general
- Karen Mills, administrator of the Small Business Administration
- Chellie Pingree, U.S. representative
- Hannah Pingree, former speaker of the Maine House of Representatives

=== Polling ===
Hypothetical polling

Poll source	Date(s) administered	Sample size	Margin of error	John Baldacci	Emily Cain	Bill Diamond	Matt Dunlap	Jeremy Fischer	Mike Michaud	Janet Mills	Karen Mills	Chellie Pingree	Ethan Strimling	Steve Woods	Other/ Undecided
Pan Atlantic SMS	March 11–16, 2013	271		—	8.9%	15.9%	6.3%	—	—	8.5%	3%	—	6.3%	—	48.7%
Public Policy Polling	January 18–20, 2013	510	±4.4%	28%	6%	—	—	2%	19%	4%	—	21%	3%	0%	16%

=== Results ===
Democratic primary results
Party	Candidate	Votes	%
Democratic	Mike Michaud	56,286	86.48
	Blank ballots	8,799	13.52
Total votes		65,085	100

== Green Independent primary ==
=== Candidates ===
==== Withdrew ====
- David Slagger, former Maliseet representative to the Maine House of Representatives (originally declared as a Democrat, switched parties, then unenrolled)

== Independents ==
=== Candidates ===
==== Declared ====
- Eliot Cutler, attorney, board member of Americans Elect and candidate for governor in 2010

==== Withdrew ====
- Adam Eldridge
- Lee Schultheis, co-founder of Hatteras Alternative Mutual Funds
- David Slagger, former Maliseet representative to the Maine House of Representatives (originally declared as a Democrat, switched parties, then unenrolled)

==== Declined ====
- Shawn Moody, businessman and candidate for governor in 2010

== General election ==
=== Candidates ===
- Eliot Cutler (Independent), attorney, board member of Americans Elect and candidate for governor in 2010
- Paul LePage (Republican), incumbent governor
- Mike Michaud (Democratic), U.S. representative

=== Campaign ===
On January 17, 2014, Eliot Cutler announced that he had challenged LePage and Michaud to a series of policy debates, with at least one to be held in each of Maine's 16 counties, over the course of the campaign. Cutler noted that neither man had a primary challenger and as such the field is largely set, with plenty of time to debate. Both LePage and Michaud's campaigns criticized Cutler as issuing such a challenge only to jump-start his campaign and generate attention.

Lee Schultheis said that his campaign was not about winning the election, but about encouraging honest conversation on the issues and working towards compromise, while criticizing the win-at-any-cost mentality in politics. He summarized his campaign as "I'm running for Governor, but not really". He had qualified for the ballot and as such had been invited to at least one debate. However, citing the fact that two of three debates he had been invited to had been cancelled, as well as the difficulty of an independent working in the two-party system, he withdrew from the race on September 5, 2014.

Cutler posted a video to his Facebook and Twitter accounts on May 5, 2014, where he responded to a voter's question about his candidacy potentially splitting the vote again. He stated that his supporters, if they felt on the night before the election that he could not win, should vote for someone else.

In July 2014, Cutler claimed that in May 2011 he had been approached by Maine Democratic Party Chairman Ben Grant to run as a Democrat in 2014, with assurances that the Party would "clear the field" in such a circumstance. Grant denied Cutler's claim, calling it "100 percent false", stating that while he had met with Cutler, that subject was not discussed. He added that the party had been focused solely on getting Mike Michaud or Chellie Pingree to run for governor. Cutler stated that he would be willing to sign an affidavit on the matter, as he remembered the conversation "very clearly". Attorney and Democratic activist Severin Beliveau disputed Cutler's claim that he had been offered a "cleared field", saying: "That's [Cutler's] ego. We all have egos, but his is in another world, in the ether somewhere." Cutler further claimed that in the spring of 2011 he was asked by then-Maine Republican Party Chairman Charlie Webster to join the Republican Party. Webster also repudiated Cutler's claim, saying that he only met Cutler as a courtesy, asking "why would Republicans want a candidate who doesn't share our views? That doesn't make sense."

LePage stated on a WVOM-FM radio show on August 7 that he believes he will either win by a landslide or lose by a landslide, stating that his views are too different from his opponents' to result in a close race.

On September 18, LePage told the editorial board of The Portsmouth Herald that he did not want their endorsement, saying his interest in it was "none, zero". He further stated "I'm not about politics. I'm about issues. I do not want be endorsed. I don't want to be mentioned in the same vein as Mike Michaud."

In mid-October, it was reported that the Maine Republican Party had begun spending money to target Democratic voters with negative attacks against Michaud that also praised Cutler, in believing Cutler would play a spoiler role. LePage had previously said in June that Cutler's candidacy was good for his re-election campaign. Meanwhile, Cutler himself has appeared to be winding down his campaign, decreasing his spending on television advertisements, leading to speculation that he was essentially conceding the race. By the end of October, this seemed to be confirmed, as columnist Ethan Strimling noted that Cutler's weekly TV spending had decreased across October from $55,000 to $50,000, then $29,000, down to $4,000. By contrast, campaign committees and outside groups supporting LePage and Michaud were outspending him 100-to-1 each.

In late October, the Republican Governors Association began airing a television advertisement that attacked Michaud before pivoting to praise Cutler, noting that he had been endorsed by Independent U.S. Senator and former Independent Governor Angus King. The spot did not mention LePage, hoping instead to persuade Michaud supporters to vote for Cutler. Michaud campaign manager Matt McTighe called it "a desperate attempt to split the vote that is uniting to defeat Gov. LePage" and King, despite having endorsed Cutler, accused the RGA of "trying to trick people" and called their tactics "[dis]honest... they're trying to promote one candidate when they're really trying to promote someone else."

After Cutler announced that he would hold a press conference on October 29, it was speculated that he was doing so to withdraw from the race. Cutler did not announce his withdrawal but did say that he was a "realist" and acknowledged that any victory by him would be a "long shot". He said that his supporters should "vote their consciences", whether that be for LePage or Michaud. Cutler went on to say that he would not withdraw to "kowtow to party politics and allow a bunch of political polls to drown out the voices of thousands of Mainers who believe that standing for principles, ideals and ideas makes you an American, not a spoiler." However, his announcement was seen by many as "an acknowledgement that [his] campaign is over." Cutler also encouraged Maine voters to support a proposed citizen initiative to implement ranked choice voting.

Immediately after his press conference, a group of former Cutler supporters reiterated their backing of Michaud, saying that "the right thing now is to unite behind Mike Michaud." Shortly after, Angus King announced that he was switching his endorsement from Cutler to Michaud, explaining: "it is clear that the voters of Maine are not prepared to elect Eliot... The good news is that we still have a chance to elect a governor who will represent the majority of Maine people: my friend and colleague, Mike Michaud." Cutler stated that he was "obviously disappointed" by King's change.

==== Debates ====
The Michaud campaign stated on July 30 that Michaud would only participate in debates where LePage is present and not attend ones where Cutler is the only other participant, because: "we are running against Paul LePage, he's who we are looking to unseat". The LePage campaign has said they will schedule debates around the Governor's work schedule and priorities and declined to participate in a debate in the Lewiston/Auburn area in September. Cutler criticized both men as "cowards" and said that they wanted voters to make their decision "on the basis of a cascade of negative television ads bought by outside special interests". Michaud's campaign responded that at least four debates have been scheduled so far.

Despite Michaud's position on debates, he did appear at a forum on September 12 to discuss energy policy topics with only Cutler, after LePage abruptly withdrew from participating, citing what he called a change in the format of the event. The LePage campaign stated that they had thought each candidate would appear on stage separately, but learned the day of the event that the candidates would share a stage. LePage said: "If you set up a format, you've got to stick to that format" and his campaign said event organizers "attempted to arrange a setting to put politics ahead of public policy". They denied the withdrawal was politically motivated to force Michaud to debate Cutler. Both the Michaud and Cutler campaigns stated they were aware of the format. Cutler offered to leave the stage while LePage spoke, but that did not change LePage's mind. Event organizers stated "there was no intent to place politics before policy" and that the issue distracted from their efforts to discuss energy policy.

LePage told WMTW Channel 8 on September 22 that he was considering not participating in any debates with Michaud, though he was still willing to debate Cutler alone. He said he did not want to share a stage with Michaud due to his not having criticized a TV advertisement by a liberal PAC publicizing a press release where LePage called Social Security "welfare, pure and simple," which LePage later stated was not what he meant. LePage said that he used to respect Michaud but called the lack of criticism "sad". Michaud responded by issuing a statement saying that LePage was looking for an excuse to avoid debates and that he should instead use them "to set the record straight and explain why he said in a press release that Social Security is 'welfare' and why Maine's economy hasn't recovered as quickly as the rest of the country." Michaud went on to state that "It's not a gubernatorial debate without the Governor." Cutler issued a statement that both the other men should "stop playing games". Michaud stated the following day at a press conference that he would attend the six debates that his campaign agreed to, regardless of what LePage does. He stated that he expected LePage would attend once his "temper tantrum" was over.

LePage announced on September 28 that he would participate in five debates, saying "This decision has come after much reflection over the past week on the value in debating Congressman Michael Michaud, who has continually been dishonest with the Maine people about Governor LePage's stance on Social Security", and saying he wanted to set the record straight.

=== Endorsements ===
Paul LePage

Politicians

- Rick Bennett, Maine Republican Party chairman, former president of the Maine Senate, 2012 US Senate candidate
- Barbara Bush, former First Lady of the United States
- George H. W. Bush, former president of the United States
- Jeb Bush, former governor of Florida
- Chris Christie, governor of New Jersey
- Susan Collins, U.S. senator (R-ME)
- Jonathan LaBonte, mayor of Auburn, director of the governor's Office of Policy and Management
- Robert MacDonald, mayor of Lewiston
- John McKernan, former governor of Maine
- Robert Nutting, state representative, former speaker of the Maine House of Representatives
- Les Otten, candidate for governor in 2010
- Kevin Raye, former president of the Maine Senate
- Olympia Snowe, former U.S. senator (R-ME)

Organizations

- Associated Builders and Contractors of Maine
- National Rifle Association of America via the NRA Political Victory Fund
Mike Michaud

Politicians

- Michael Brennan, mayor of Portland
- Steve Buyer, former U.S. representative (R-IN)
- Bill Clinton, former president of the United States
- Hillary Clinton, former United States Secretary of State, former U.S. senator (D-NY)
- Beverly Daggett, Kennebec County commissioner, former president of the Maine Senate
- Jeffrey Evangelos, state representative
- Kirk Francis, chief of the Penobscot Nation
- Geoffrey Gratwick, state senator
- Karen Heck, mayor of Waterville
- Angus King, U.S. senator (I-ME) and former governor (had endorsed Cutler until October 29)
- Colleen Lachowicz, state senator
- Maeghan Maloney, Kennebec County district attorney
- Dale McCormick, Augusta city councilor, former state treasurer of Maine
- George Mitchell, former U.S. Senate majority leader (D-ME)
- Frederick Moore III, chief of the Passamaquoddy Tribe, Pleasant Point
- William J. Nichols Sr., chief of the Passamaquoddy Tribe, Indian Township
- Barack Obama, president of the United States
- Michelle Obama, First Lady of the United States
- Deval Patrick, governor of Massachusetts
- Hannah Pingree, former speaker of the Maine House of Representatives
- Anthony Principi, former United States Secretary of Veterans Affairs for President George W. Bush
- Debbie Wasserman Schultz, U.S. representative (D-FL), chair of the Democratic National Committee
- Peter Shumlin, governor of Vermont
- Ted Strickland, former governor of Ohio
- Charlotte Warren, mayor of Hallowell
- Steve Woods, businessman, chairman of the Yarmouth Town Council and independent candidate for the U.S. Senate in 2012

Individuals

- Brig. Gen. (retired) John Bubar, Maine National Guard
- James Carville, Democratic strategist, Fox News contributor
- Brig. Gen. (retired) Don McCormack, Maine National Guard, former LePage appointee to the Department of Administrative and Financial Services
- Cecile Richards, president of Planned Parenthood Federation of America
- Betsy Smith, former executive director of EqualityMaine (had endorsed Cutler until October 31)

Unions

- AFL–CIO
- American Maritime Officers
- International Alliance for Theatrical Stage Employees
- International Association of Machinists & Aerospace Workers Local S-6
- International Union for Painters and Allied Trades
- Maine Association of Police
- Maine Credit Union League
- Maine Education Association
- Maine State Employees Union Local 1989
- Maine State Troopers Association
- Marine Engineers' Beneficial Association
- Masters, Mates & Pilots Union
- Northern New England Laborers
- Professional Fire Fighters of Maine
- Seafarers International Union
- Teamsters Local 340
- United Association of Journeymen and Apprentices of the Plumbing and Pipe Fitting Industry
- United Auto Workers Union
- United Food and Commercial Workers
- United Steelworkers

Organizations

- Democracy for America
- Environment Maine
- EqualityMaine
- Human Rights Campaign
- Maine Conservation Voters
- Maine People's Alliance
- Maine Renewable Energy Association
- NARAL Pro-Choice America PAC
- National Committee to Preserve Social Security and Medicare
- Planned Parenthood Maine Action Fund PAC
- Sierra Club
- Victory Fund
Eliot Cutler

Politicians

- Nelson Durgin, Republican Bangor city councilor
- Patrick Flood, Republican state senator, ranking Appropriations Committee member
- Horace "Hoddy" Hildreth Jr., former Republican legislator, son of former governor, and environmentalist
- Sherry Huber, former Republican legislator, candidate for governor, and co-founder of the Family Planning Association of Maine
- John Nutting, former Democratic state senator
- Edward Suslovic, Democratic Portland city councilor

Individuals

- Marpheen Chann Berry, former chair of the University of Southern Maine College Democrats and student body vice president
- Mark McKinnon, co-founder of No Labels
- Edmund Muskie Jr., son of the late senator and United States Secretary of State Edmund Muskie
- Lynne Williams, former chair of the Maine Green Independent Party

Organizations

- Maine Citizens Against Handgun Violence

Newspapers

- Bangor Daily News
- The Portsmouth Herald
- The Times Record, newspaper of Brunswick
Declined to endorse
- Lewiston Sun Journal
- MaineToday Media newspapers
- Sportsman's Alliance of Maine

=== Predictions ===
Source	Ranking	As of
The Cook Political Report	Tossup	November 3, 2014
Sabato's Crystal Ball	Lean D (flip)	November 3, 2014
Rothenberg Political Report	Tossup	November 3, 2014
Real Clear Politics	Tossup	November 3, 2014

=== Polling ===
Poll source	Date(s) administered	Sample size	Margin of error	Paul LePage (R)	Mike Michaud (D)	Eliot Cutler (I)	Other	Undecided
Maine People's Resource Center	October 31–November 2, 2014	906	± 3.25%	44%	45%	9%	—	2%
Bangor Daily News/Ipsos	October 23–29, 2014	488	± 5.1%	42%	42%	13%	—	2%
Bangor Daily News/Ipsos	October 23–29, 2014	488	± 5.1%	46%	48%	—	2%	3%
Bangor Daily News/Ipsos	October 23–29, 2014	488	± 5.1%	40%	—	53%	4%	3%
Magellan Strategies	October 22–23, 2014	869	± 3.32%	42%	42%	13%	1%	2%
Public Policy Polling	October 22–23, 2014	660	± 3.6%	40%	40%	17%	—	3%
Public Policy Polling	October 22–23, 2014	660	± 3.6%	44%	49%	—	—	7%
CBS News/NYT/YouGov	October 16–23, 2014	1,177	± 5%	35%	37%	7%	0%	21%
Pan Atlantic/SMS Group	October 15–21, 2014	400	± 4.9%	40%	40%	13%	—	7%
Pan Atlantic/SMS Group	October 15–21, 2014	400	± 4.9%	44%	49%	—	—	8%
University of New Hampshire	October 15–21, 2014	639	± 3.8%	45%	35%	16%	—	4%
University of New Hampshire	October 15–21, 2014	641	± 3.8%	50%	43%	—	—	6%
University of New Hampshire	October 15–21, 2014	625	± 3.8%	48%	—	47%	—	5%
Bangor Daily News/Ipsos	October 6–12, 2014							
Bangor Daily News/Ipsos	October 6–12, 2014	540 LV	± 4.8%	36%	42%	16%	1%	5%
Bangor Daily News/Ipsos	October 6–12, 2014	540 LV	± 4.8%	41%	50%	—	3%	6%
Bangor Daily News/Ipsos	October 6–12, 2014	540 LV	± 4.8%	38%	—	49%	6%	7%
Bangor Daily News/Ipsos	October 6–12, 2014	903 RV	± 3.7%	30%	43%	19%	1%	6%
Bangor Daily News/Ipsos	October 6–12, 2014	903 RV	± 3.7%	35%	52%	—	5%	7%
Bangor Daily News/Ipsos	October 6–12, 2014	903 RV	± 3.7%	32%	—	50%	8%	8%
Rasmussen Reports	October 7–9, 2014	930	± 3%	41%	40%	16%	1%	3%
Greenberg Quinlan Rosner	October 5–7, 2014	605	± 4%	39%	43%	15%	—	3%
CBS News/NYT/YouGov	September 20–October 1, 2014	1,531	± 3%	37%	39%	10%	0%	13%
Critical Insights	September 24–30, 2014	606	± 4%	39%	36%	21%	—	4%
Pan Atlantic/SMS Group	September 23–29, 2014	400	± 4.9%	39%	34%	20%	—	8%
Pan Atlantic/SMS Group	September 23–29, 2014	400	± 4.9%	46%	47%	—	—	7%
University of New Hampshire	September 18–25, 2014	482	± 4.4%	38%	40%	12%	—	10%
University of New Hampshire	September 18–25, 2014	482	± 4.4%	44%	50%	—	—	6%
University of New Hampshire	September 18–25, 2014	482	± 4.4%	41%	—	52%	—	7%
Greenberg Quinlan Rosner	September 21–23, 2014	605	± 4%	38%	44%	15%	—	3%
Greenberg Quinlan Rosner	September 7–10, 2014	900	± 3.3%	40%	42%	15%	—	3%
Public Policy Polling	September 8–9, 2014	1,059	± 3%	42%	43%	11%	—	3%
Public Policy Polling	September 8–9, 2014	1,059	± 3%	46%	50%	—	—	4%
Rasmussen Reports	September 3–4, 2014	750	± 4%	39%	43%	15%	—	4%
CBS News/NYT/YouGov	August 18–September 2, 2014	1,202	± 4%	38%	37%	10%	0%	14%
Maine People's Resource Center	July 26–28, 2014	796	± 3.47%	41%	43%	13%	—	4%
CBS News/NYT/YouGov	July 5–24, 2014	1,353	± 2.7%	38%	52%	—	5%	4%
Normington Petts	July 14–16, 2014	600	± 4%	37%	41%	13%	—	9%
University of New Hampshire	June 12–18, 2014	527	± 4.3%	36%	40%	15%	2%	7%
University of New Hampshire	June 12–18, 2014	527	± 4.3%	44%	51%	—	—	4%
University of New Hampshire	June 12–18, 2014	527	± 4.3%	38%	—	50%	3%	9%
Public Policy Polling	May 5–6, 2014	754	± ?	39%	43%	15%	—	3%
Rasmussen Reports	April 23–25, 2014	830	± 3%	40%	40%	14%	1%	5%
Critical Insights	April 16–23, 2014	601	± 4%	36%	37%	18%	—	8%
Pan Atlantic/SMS Group	March 31–April 5, 2014	400	± 4.9%	39%	37%	20%	—	4%
Public Policy Polling	April 1–2, 2014	583	± 3.5%	37%	44%	14%	—	5%
Normington Petts	March 3–6, 2014	800	± 3.5%	35%	39%	16%	<1%	9%
Greenberg Quinlan Rosner	January 13–23, 2014	400	± 4.9%	32%	45%	18%	—	5%
Pan Atlantic SMS	November 25–30, 2013	400	± 4.9%	36%	37%	18%	—	9%
Public Policy Polling	November 8–11, 2013	964	± 3.2%	36%	38%	15%	—	10%
Public Policy Polling	November 8–11, 2013	964	± 3.2%	39%	53%	—	—	8%
Public Policy Polling	November 8–11, 2013	964	± 3.2%	38%	—	49%	—	13%
Critical Insights	September 27–30, 2013	600	± 4%	30%	33%	24%	—	14%
Maine People's Resource Center	September 8–10, 2013	652	± 3.84%	34%	40%	17%	—	9%
Maine People's Resource Center	September 8–10, 2013	652	± 3.84%	36%	56%	—	—	8%
Public Policy Polling	August 23–25, 2013	953	± 3.2%	35%	39%	18%	—	9%
Public Policy Polling	August 23–25, 2013	953	± 3.2%	39%	54%	—	—	7%
Greenberg Quinlan Rosner	July 11–16, 2013	400	± 4.9%	31%	40%	26%	—	3%
Greenberg Quinlan Rosner	July 11–16, 2013	400	± 4.9%	34%	61%	—	—	3%
Clarity Campaigns	June 22–24, 2013	628	± 3.72%	32%	32%	24%	—	12%
Pan Atlantic SMS	March 11–16, 2013	403	± 4.9%	34%	23%	26%	—	18%
Pan Atlantic SMS	March 11–16, 2013	403	± 4.9%	35%	—	42%	8%	15%
Public Policy Polling	January 18–20, 2013	1,268	± 2.8%	34%	30%	26%	—	10%
Public Policy Polling	January 18–20, 2013	1,268	± 2.8%	36%	57%	—	—	9%
Public Policy Polling	January 18–20, 2013	1,268	± 2.8%	41%	—	49%	—	10%

Hypothetical polling

Two-way races

Poll source	Date(s) administered	Sample size	Margin of error	Paul LePage (R)	John Baldacci (D)	Other	Undecided
Public Policy Polling	January 18–20, 2013	1,268	± 2.8%	38%	53%	—	9%

Poll source	Date(s) administered	Sample size	Margin of error	Paul LePage (R)	Chellie Pingree (D)	Other	Undecided
Public Policy Polling	January 18–20, 2013	1,268	± 2.8%	40%	53%	—	7%

Poll source	Date(s) administered	Sample size	Margin of error	Paul LePage (R)	Democratic opponent (D)	Other	Undecided
Public Policy Polling	November 1–2, 2012	1,633	± 2.4%	41%	49%	—	10%
Public Policy Polling	September 17–18, 2012	804	± 3.5%	40%	48%	—	12%

Three-way races

Poll source	Date(s) administered	Sample size	Margin of error	Paul LePage (R)	John Baldacci (D)	Eliot Cutler (I)	Other	Undecided
Pan Atlantic SMS	March 11–16, 2013	403	± 4.9%	37%	21%	27%	—	15%
Public Policy Polling	January 18–20, 2013	1,268	± 2.8%	36%	27%	29%	—	8%

Poll source	Date(s) administered	Sample size	Margin of error	Paul LePage (R)	Janet Mills (D)	Eliot Cutler (I)	Other	Undecided
Public Policy Polling	January 18–20, 2013	1,268	± 2.8%	37%	19%	32%	—	12%

Poll source	Date(s) administered	Sample size	Margin of error	Paul LePage (R)	Chellie Pingree (D)	Eliot Cutler (I)	Other	Undecided
Public Policy Polling	January 18–20, 2013	1,268	± 2.8%	37%	31%	23%	—	9%

Poll source	Date(s) administered	Sample size	Margin of error	Paul LePage (R)	Ethan Strimling (D)	Eliot Cutler (I)	Other	Undecided
Public Policy Polling	January 18–20, 2013	1,268	± 2.8%	37%	15%	32%	—	16%

Poll source	Date(s) administered	Sample size	Margin of error	Paul LePage (R)	Democratic opponent (D)	Eliot Cutler (I)	None of the above	Undecided
Critical Insights	May 1–7, 2013	600	± 4%	30%	16%	28%	4%	21%

=== Results ===
County Flips: Democratic Flip Republican Hold Flip

Maine gubernatorial election, 2014
Party	Candidate	Votes	%	±%
Republican	Paul LePage (incumbent)	294,533	48.18%	+10.62%
Democratic	Mike Michaud	265,125	43.37%	+24.53%
Independent	Eliot Cutler	51,518	8.43%	−27.45%
Write-in		79	0.01%	N/A
Total votes		611,255	100.00%	N/A
Republican hold				

==== Results by county ====
County	Paul LePage Republican		Michael Michaud Democratic		Eliot Cutler Independent		Various candidates Other parties		Margin		Total votes cast
County	#	%	#	%	#	%	#	%	#	%	Total votes cast
Androscoggin	25,987	56.6%	16,376	35.7%	3,556	7.7%	1	0.01%	9,611	20.9%	45,920
Aroostook	13,725	47.6%	12,398	43.0%	2,727	9.5%	6	0.01%	1,327	4.6%	28,856
Cumberland	55,932	39.7%	72,217	51.2%	12,836	9.1%	22	0.01%	-16,285	-11.5%	141,007
Franklin	7,591	53.2%	5,426	38.0%	1,241	8.7%	7	0.01%	2,165	15.2%	14,265
Hancock	12,016	45.7%	12,007	45.7%	2,268	8.6%	3	0.01%	9	0.0%	26,294
Kennebec	28,343	50.0%	24,130	42.5%	4,243	7.5%	8	0.01%	4,213	7.5%	56,724
Knox	8,425	44.6%	8,911	47.2%	1,555	8.2%	0	0.0%	-486	-2.6%	18,891
Lincoln	9,157	50.5%	7,633	42.1%	1,351	7.4%	0	0.0%	1,524	8.4%	18,141
Oxford	14,902	56.4%	9,269	35.1%	2,226	8.4%	3	0.01%	5,633	21.3%	26,400
Penobscot	33,197	51.8%	26,220	40.9%	4,713	7.3%	0	0.0%	6,977	10.9%	64,130
Piscataquis	4,736	57.9%	2,810	34.4%	631	7.7%	2	0.01%	1,926	23.5%	8,179
Sagadahoc	8,760	47.2%	8,264	44.5%	1,550	8.3%	3	0.01%	496	2.7%	18,577
Somerset	12,194	54.9%	8,422	37.9%	1,586	7.1%	1	0.01%	3,772	17.0%	22,203
Waldo	8,862	48.0%	8,167	44.2%	1,440	7.8%	6	0.01%	695	3.8%	18,475
Washington	7,390	52.8%	5,452	38.9%	1,157	8.3%	3	0.01%	1,938	13.9%	14,002
York	43,055	48.7%	36,905	41.8%	8,361	9.5%	14	0.01%	6,150	6.9%	88,335
Totals	294,533	48.2%	265,125	43.4%	51,518	8.4%	79	0.01%	29,408	4.8%	611,255

Counties that flipped from Independent to Democratic

- Cumberland (largest municipality: Portland)
- Knox (largest municipality: Rockland)

Counties that flipped from Independent to Republican

- Hancock (largest municipality: Ellsworth)
- Sagadahoc (largest town: Bath)

==== By congressional district ====
LePage and Michaud each won one of two congressional districts. Michaud won the first congressional district, but lost the second, which he had represented in Congress since 2003.

District	LePage	Michaud	Representative
1st	44%	47%	Chellie Pingree
2nd	52%	40%	Mike Michaud (113th Congress)
2nd	52%	40%	Bruce Poliquin (114th Congress)

== See also ==
- 2014 United States gubernatorial elections
- 2014 United States Senate election in Maine
