= Meredith Strang Burgess =

American politician

Meredith Strang Burgess (born April 27, 1956) is an American politician from Maine. A Republican, Strang Burgess served three terms (2006-2012) in the Maine House of Representatives, representing the town of Cumberland.

Strang Burgess was a co-sponsor of the successful 2009 same-sex marriage bill. The bill was repealed via people's veto in November of that year. Three years later, in 2012, Strang Burgess was one of three sitting Republican state legislators to support the successful state referendum legalizing same sex marriage.

In December 2013, Strang Burgess was rumored to be a potential candidate for U.S. Congress.
