= Patrick Flood =

American politician

Member of the Maine Senate from the 21st district
- In office 2012–2014
- Preceded by: Earle McCormick
- Succeeded by: Earle McCormick

Personal details
- Born: September 12, 1951 (age 74) Hudson, New York
- Party: Republican
- Spouse: Marjorie Flood

Patrick S.A. Flood (born September 12, 1951) is an American politician from Maine. Flood served as a Republican State Senator from Maine's 21st District, representing part of Kennebec County, including Hallowell, Gardiner and his residence of Winthrop. He was first elected to the Maine State Senate in 2012 after serving from 2004 to 2012 in the Maine House of Representatives. In January 2014, Flood announced he would not seek re-election in order to travel with his wife and spend time with his mother.

As a member of the House of Representatives, Flood served from 2010 to 2012 as the House chairman of the budget-reviewing Appropriations Committee. In June 2012, incumbent Republican State Senator Earle McCormick withdrew from the general election after facing an uncontested renomination for District 21. Flood was named his replacement. He defeated Democrat former State Representative David Bustin in the November general election by approximately 300 votes.

In 1974, Flood earned a B.S. from the State University of New York College of Environmental Science and Forestry in Natural Resource Management. He began work with International Paper in the same year.

Flood endorsed independent Eliot Cutler in the 2014 Maine gubernatorial election.
