= 2010 Maine gubernatorial election =

- November 2, 2010
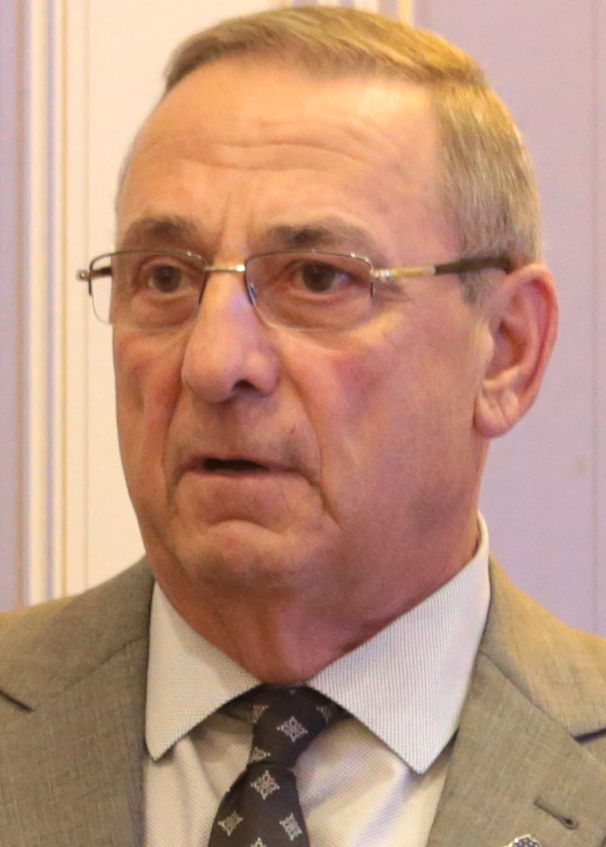

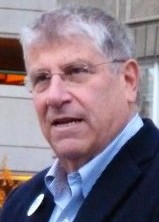
| Nominee | Paul LePage | Eliot Cutler |
| Party | Republican | Independent |
| Popular vote | 218,065 | 208,270 |
| Percentage | 37.56% | 35.88% |
| Nominee | Libby Mitchell | Shawn Moody |
| Party | Democratic | Independent |
| Popular vote | 109,387 | 28,756 |
| Percentage | 18.84% | 4.95% |
- LePage: 20–30% 30–40% 40–50% 50–60% 60–70% 70–80% 80–90% >90% Cutler: 30–40% 40–50% 50–60% 60–70% 70–80% >90% Mitchell: 30–40% 40–50% 50–60% 60–70% Tie
Governor before election
John Baldacci
Democratic
Elected Governor
Paul LePage
Republican

The 2010 Maine gubernatorial election took place on November 2, 2010, to elect the governor of Maine. Incumbent Democratic Governor John Baldacci was term-limited and could not seek a third consecutive term. Primary elections took place on June 8, 2010. The candidates who appeared on the November ballot were Eliot Cutler (independent), Paul LePage (Republican), Libby Mitchell (Democratic), Shawn Moody (independent), and Kevin Scott (independent).

With 94% of precincts reporting on the day after the election, the Bangor Daily News declared LePage the winner, carrying 38.1% of the votes. Cutler was in second place with 36.7% of the votes (less than 7,500 votes behind LePage), while Mitchell was a distant third with 19%. Moody and Scott had 5% and 1%, respectively. Two days after the election, with 99% of precincts reporting, LePage's lead over Cutler had widened to more than 10,000 votes. This election was the first since 1990 that Maine elected a Republican governor.

As of 2026, this is the last time Cumberland and Knox counties did not vote for the Democratic nominee.

== Democratic primary ==
=== Candidates ===
==== On ballot ====
- Patrick K. McGowan, former state conservation commissioner
- Elizabeth "Libby" Mitchell, president of the Maine Senate and nominee for U.S. Senate in 1984
- Steven Rowe, former Maine attorney general and former state representative
- Rosa Scarcelli, business owner

==== Write-in ====
- Donna Dion, former mayor of Biddeford. Did not appear on the ballot due to lack of petition signatures, but continued her campaign in the primary as a write-in candidate.

==== Withdrawn ====
- Dawn Hill, state representative. Hill withdrew from the race on January 1, 2010, citing the crowded field of candidates.
- John G. Richardson, former commissioner of economic and community development and former speaker of the House. Richardson withdrew from the race on April 26 amid allegations that some of his campaign workers had not followed proper procedures for collecting donations to qualify him for Maine Clean Election funding. The primary ballots had already been printed before Richardson withdrew from the race, so Richardson's name appeared on the ballot even though he was no longer a candidate.
- Peter Truman (also known as Peter Throumoulos), former state representative and convicted forger. Did not appear on the ballot due to lack of petition signatures.

==== Declined ====
- Tom Allen, former U.S. Representative
- Brian Bolduc, state representative

=== Polling ===
| Poll source | Dates administered | Mitchell | Rowe | Scarcelli | McGowan | Undecided |
|---|---|---|---|---|---|---|
| Pan Atlantic SMS Group | May 21–29, 2010 | 13.3% | 11.7% | 7.0% | 6.3% | 61.7% |

=== Results ===
Results by county Mitchell: 30–40%; 40–50%; Rowe: 40–50%; McGowan: 30–40%

Democratic primary results
| Party | Candidate | Votes | % |
|---|---|---|---|
| Democratic | Elizabeth "Libby" Mitchell | 42,328 | 34.4 |
| Democratic | G. Steven Rowe | 27,923 | 22.7 |
| Democratic | Rosa Scarcelli | 26,444 | 21.5 |
| Democratic | Patrick K. McGowan | 24,392 | 19.8 |
| Democratic | John Richardson | 1,604 | 1.3 |
| Democratic | Write-in | 236 | 0.3 |
| Total votes | | 122,927 | 100 |

At 11:32 p.m. EDT, WCSH declared Libby Mitchell the winner of the Democratic primary.

== Republican primary ==
=== Candidates ===
==== On ballot ====
- Steve Abbott, former chief of staff for Senator Susan Collins
- William Beardsley, former president of Husson University
- Matt Jacobson, president of Maine & Company, a private business attraction organization; former president of the St. Lawrence & Atlantic Railroad
- Paul LePage, mayor of Waterville and general manager of Marden's Surplus & Salvage store chain
- Peter Mills, state senator and candidate for governor in 2006
- Les Otten, founder of American Skiing Company and former Boston Red Sox co-owner
- Bruce Poliquin, business owner/manager and economist

==== Declined ====
- Peter Cianchette, United States ambassador to Costa Rica and 2002 Republican nominee for governor
- Kevin Raye, State Senate minority leader
- Josh Tardy, State House minority leader

=== Polling ===
| Poll source | Dates administered | Otten | LePage | Mills | Abbott | Beardsley | Poliquin | Jacobson | Undecided |
|---|---|---|---|---|---|---|---|---|---|
| MECPO | May 22-June 2, 2010 | 17.0% | 10.7% | 22.1% | 13.9% | 5.9% | 4.9% | 1.4% | 24.0% |
| Pan Atlantic SMS Group | May 21–29, 2010 | 17.0% | 10.3% | 8.4% | 8.3% | 3.6% | 3.3% | 2.0% | 47.0% |

=== Results ===
Results by county LePage: 20–30%; 30–40%; 40–50%; 50–60%; Otten: 30–40%; Beardsley: 30–40%

Republican primary results
| Party | Candidate | Votes | % |
|---|---|---|---|
| Republican | Paul LePage | 49,126 | 37.4 |
| Republican | Les Otten | 22,945 | 17.4 |
| Republican | Peter Mills | 19,271 | 14.7 |
| Republican | Steve Abbott | 17,209 | 13.1 |
| Republican | William "Bill" Beardsley | 12,061 | 9.2 |
| Republican | Bruce Poliquin | 6,471 | 4.9 |
| Republican | Matt Jacobson | 4,324 | 3.3 |
| Total votes | | 131,407 | 100 |

At 11:19 p.m. EDT, WCSH declared Paul LePage the winner of the GOP primary.

== Independents ==
=== Candidates on the ballot ===
- Eliot Cutler, attorney, former staff member for U.S. Senator Edmund Muskie, and former adviser to President Jimmy Carter
- Shawn Moody, business owner
- Kevin L. Scott, business owner

=== Write-in candidates ===
- Beverly Cooper-Pete Did not appear on the ballot due to lack of petition signatures, but continued her campaign as a write-in candidate.
- John Jenkins, former state senator, former mayor of both Auburn and Lewiston, and 2002 gubernatorial candidate. Jenkins, who won his most recent mayoral campaign by write-in, declared he would run for governor of Maine if 5,000 people followed his Facebook fan page within 45 days.

=== Disqualified candidates ===
- Alex Hammer, business owner and self-published author. Did not appear on the ballot due to not meeting the deadline for turning in petition signatures. Hammer attempted to turn in some of the signatures electronically, but the secretary of state ruled that such methods were not allowed. Hammer filed suit to appear on the ballot in Penobscot County Superior Court on June 28, 2010. On September 28, 2010, the judge upheld the secretary of state's decision.

=== Withdrawn ===
- Samme Bailey. Did not appear on the ballot due to lack of petition signatures.
- Augustus Edgerton. Did not appear on the ballot due to lack of petition signatures.
- Michael Heath, former leader of the Christian Civic League of Maine (now known as the Maine Family Policy Council). Withdrew from the race due to lack of petition signatures.
- John Whitcomb. Did not appear on the ballot due to lack of petition signatures.

== Maine Green Independent Party ==
The Maine Green Independent Party did not have a gubernatorial candidate on the ballot, as no candidate collected the required number of signatures.

=== Withdrawn ===
- Patrick Quinlan, political activist, author, and lone legislative aide of Maine Green Independent Party caucus in state House of Representatives for 2004 and 2005; former campaign manager and consultant for Green state representative John Eder
- Lynne Williams, attorney and former state chair of the Maine Green Independent Party. On March 15, 2010, she announced her withdrawal from the campaign, citing a lack of clean elections funds and qualifying signatures.

== General election ==
=== Predictions ===
| Source | Ranking | As of |
|---|---|---|
| Cook Political Report | Tossup | October 14, 2010 |
| Rothenberg | Tilt R (flip) | October 28, 2010 |
| RealClearPolitics | Likely R (flip) | November 1, 2010 |
| Sabato's Crystal Ball | Lean R (flip) | October 28, 2010 |
| CQ Politics | Lean D | October 28, 2010 |

=== Polling ===
| Poll source | Date(s) administered | Sample size | Margin of error | Paul LePage (R) | Libby Mitchell (D) | Eliot Cutler (I) | Shawn Moody (I) | Kevin Scott (I) | Undecided |
|---|---|---|---|---|---|---|---|---|---|
| MPRC/Down East Magazine | October 28–30, 2010 | 546 | ± 4.19% | 39% | 24% | 29% | 4% | 1% | 2% |
| Critical Insights/MaineToday Media | October 27–28, 2010 | 621 | ± 4% | 40% | 21% | 21% | 4% | 1% | 11% |
| Pan Atlantic SMS | October 25–28, 2010 | 400 | ± 4.9% | 38.6% | 21.8% | 30.6% | 2.8% | 1.1% | 7.3% |
| Public Policy Polling | October 26–28, 2010 | 1,812 | ± 2.3% | 40% | 24% | 28% | 4% | 1% | 2% |
| Rasmussen Reports | October 26, 2010 | 500 | ± 4.5% | 40% | 26% | 26% | - | - | 5% |
| Critical Insights | October 13–17, 2010 | 600 | ± 4% | 32% | 20% | 19% | 5% | 1% | 21% |
| Pan Atlantic SMS | October 11–15, 2010 | 501 | ± 4.4% | 32.9% | 28.0% | 14.0% | 4.6% | 0.4% | 20.2% |
| Rasmussen Reports | October 12, 2010 | 500 | ± 4.5% | 35% | 32% | 21% | * | * | 6% |
| Critical Insights/MaineToday Media | October 10–11, 2010 | 605 | ± 4% | 32% | 26% | 11% | 5 | 1 | 26% |
| Pine Tree Politics/Maine Center for Public Opinion | October 4–7, 2010 | 679 | ± 3.76% | 29.6% | 28.7% | 11.1% | 4.9% | 1.6% | 24.1% |
| Critical Insights/MaineToday Media | September 27, 2010 | 405 | ± 4.9% | 29% | 30% | 9% | 5% | 0% | 26% |
| Rasmussen Reports | September 20, 2010 | 500 | ± 4.5% | 45% | 27% | 14% | * | * | 10% |
| Critical Insights/MaineToday Media | September 13, 2010 | 603 | ± 4% | 38% | 25% | 11% | 4% | 1% | 21% |
| Public Policy Polling | September 2–6, 2010 | 1,468 | ± 2.6% | 43% | 29% | 11% | 5% | 1% | 12% |
| Rasmussen Reports | August 12, 2010 | 500 | ± 4.5% | 38% | 30% | 16% | * | * | 11% |
| Rasmussen Reports | July 14, 2010 | 500 | ± 4.5% | 39% | 31% | 15% | * | * | 12% |
| Rasmussen Reports | June 10, 2010 | 500 | ± 4.5% | 43% | 36% | 7% | * | * | 14% |

* Shawn Moody and Kevin Scott, two Independent candidates who appeared on the ballot, were not offered as choices in the Rasmussen polls.

=== Results ===
County flips: Independent Flip from Democratic / Republican Hold Flip from Democratic

2010 gubernatorial election, Maine
| Party | Candidate | Votes | % | ±% |
|---|---|---|---|---|
| Republican | Paul LePage | 218,065 | 37.56% | +7.39% |
| Independent | Eliot Cutler | 208,270 | 35.88% | — |
| Democratic | Libby Mitchell | 109,387 | 18.84% | −19.31% |
| Independent | Shawn Moody | 28,756 | 4.95% | — |
| Independent | Kevin Scott | 5,664 | 0.98% | |
| Majority | | 9,795 | 1.68% | −6.2 |
| Turnout | | 580,538 | | +29,673 |
| Republican gain from Democratic | | Swing | | |

=== Results by county ===
| County | Paul LePage Republican | | Eliot Cutler Independent | | Libby Mitchell Democratic | | Shawn Moody Independent | | Various candidates Other parties | | Margin | | Total votes cast |
| County | # | % | # | % | # | % | # | % | # | % | # | % | Total votes cast |
|---|---|---|---|---|---|---|---|---|---|---|---|---|---|
| Androscoggin | 18,007 | 43.0% | 13,316 | 31.8% | 6,838 | 16.3% | 1,566 | 3.7% | 2,149 | 5.1% | 4,691 | 11.2% | 41,876 |
| Aroostook | 11,353 | 42.4% | 7,478 | 28.0% | 5,307 | 19.8% | 2,030 | 7.6% | 584 | 2.2% | 3,875 | 14.4% | 26,752 |
| Cumberland | 38,984 | 30.4% | 53,036 | 41.3% | 27,097 | 21.1% | 8,423 | 6.6% | 881 | 0.7% | -14,052 | -10.9% | 128,421 |
| Franklin | 5,877 | 42.9% | 4,495 | 32.8% | 2,571 | 18.8% | 520 | 3.8% | 241 | 1.8% | 1,382 | 10.1% | 13,704 |
| Hancock | 9,056 | 35.2% | 11,258 | 43.8% | 4,445 | 17.3% | 774 | 3.0% | 190 | 0.7% | -2,202 | -8.6% | 25,723 |
| Kennebec | 23,567 | 43.5% | 17,146 | 31.6% | 11,406 | 21.0% | 1,482 | 2.7% | 620 | 1.1% | 6,421 | 11.9% | 54,221 |
| Knox | 6,830 | 36.5% | 7,327 | 39.2% | 3,970 | 21.2% | 442 | 2.4% | 132 | 0.7% | -497 | -2.7% | 18,701 |
| Lincoln | 7,196 | 40.5% | 6,598 | 37.2% | 3,304 | 18.6% | 516 | 2.9% | 141 | 0.8% | 598 | 3.3% | 17,755 |
| Oxford | 10,281 | 39.5% | 8,416 | 32.4% | 4,659 | 17.9% | 1,437 | 5.5% | 1,207 | 4.6% | 1,865 | 7.1% | 26,000 |
| Penobscot | 25,721 | 42.5% | 24,150 | 39.9% | 8,253 | 13.6% | 1,856 | 3.1% | 527 | 0.9% | 1,571 | 2.6% | 60,507 |
| Piscataquis | 3,724 | 48.5% | 2,809 | 36.5% | 837 | 10.9% | 235 | 3.1% | 81 | 1.1% | 915 | 12.0% | 7,686 |
| Sagadahoc | 6,495 | 37.2% | 6,796 | 39.0% | 3,330 | 19.1% | 647 | 3.7% | 180 | 1.0% | -301 | -1.8% | 17,448 |
| Somerset | 9,994 | 48.8% | 6,814 | 33.3% | 2,703 | 13.2% | 699 | 3.4% | 258 | 1.3% | 3,180 | 15.5% | 20,468 |
| Waldo | 7,088 | 40.3% | 6,684 | 38.0% | 3,053 | 17.4% | 614 | 3.5% | 150 | 0.9% | 404 | 2.3% | 17,589 |
| Washington | 5,586 | 43.1% | 4,846 | 37.4% | 1,858 | 14.4% | 475 | 3.7% | 181 | 1.4% | 740 | 5.7% | 12,946 |
| York | 28,103 | 34.1% | 27,031 | 32.8% | 19,456 | 23.6% | 7,026 | 8.5% | 754 | 0.9% | 1,072 | 1.3% | 82,370 |
| Totals | 218,065 | 38.1% | 208,270 | 36.4% | 109,387 | 19.1% | 28,756 | 5.0% | 8,288 | 1.4% | 9,765 | 1.7% | 572,766 |

Counties that flipped from Democratic to Republican

- Androscoggin (largest city: Lewiston)
- Aroostook (largest city: Presque Isle)
- Kennebec (largest city: Augusta)
- Lincoln (largest city: Waldoboro)
- Oxford (largest town: Rumford)
- Penobscot (largest city: Bangor)
- Waldo (largest city: Belfast)
- York (largest town: Biddeford)

Counties that flipped from Democratic to Independent

- Cumberland (largest municipality: Portland)
- Hancock (largest municipality: Ellsworth)
- Knox (largest municipality: Rockland)
- Sagadahoc (largest town: Bath)

== Analysis ==
Despite polling in the low teens as late as mid-October, Cutler surged in the final weeks of the campaign to surpass Mitchell and finish second. LePage won with only 37.6% of the vote, the second-lowest percentage for any winning Maine gubernatorial candidate behind independent Angus King's 35.7% in 1994. LePage was considered to have benefitted from vote splitting between the Democrat Mitchell and the Democrat-turned-independent Cutler. Mitchell would ultimately win just 18.8% of the vote, carrying only Kittery and Ogunquit in the extreme south of the state, two of the state's three Indian reservations (the Passamaquoddy Indian Township Reservation and the Penobscot Indian Island Reservation), and a handful of staunchly Democratic municipalities in northern Aroostook County near the Canadian border. Cutler carried many other traditionally Democratic areas of the state, such as the Greater Portland area and Mount Desert Island. Mitchell's performance was the worst for any Democratic gubernatorial candidate since 1998, when Democrat Thomas J. Connolly would win just 12% of the vote in the midst of King's 16-county landslide re-election. This election remains the last time the Democratic nominee failed to carry a single county in a Maine gubernatorial election.

In addition, a number of municipalities and voting precincts finished as exact ties in official results: the municipalities of Bancroft, Dallas Plantation, Gilead, Madrid, Orient, Vanceboro, and Wesley, finished as exact ties between LePage and Cutler, while a precinct for voters in unincorporated eastern Aroostook County finished as a tie between Cutler and fellow independent Shawn Moody, with each receiving one vote.

=== Aftermath ===
Paul LePage and Eliot Cutler would face off again in 2014, though Cutler would ultimately garner just 8% of the vote in that election. LePage would win re-election that year with over 48% of the vote, his closest opponent being Democrat Mike Michaud, who received 43% of the vote. LePage would again be the Republican gubernatorial nominee in 2022, an election he would lose to Democrat Janet Mills by 13 points. In 2026, LePage would be elected to Congress from Maine's 2nd congressional district, the only Republican to flip a non-redistricted seat in the 2026 "blue wave".

In 2022, Cutler would be arrested for possession of child pornography, resulting in him serving seven months in jail and being required to register as a sex offender for the rest of his life. Various probation violations in 2025 and 2026 resulted in him being sent back to jail for another six months in September of 2026.

Shawn Moody, who finished the 2010 election with 5% of the vote as an independent, would become a Republican in 2017. He was the Republican nominee for governor in 2018, an election he would lose to Janet Mills. He would also form an exploratory committee to run for the Republican nomination in 2026, but ultimately chose not to enter the race.

== See also ==
- List of governors of Maine
