= Thomas Martin (Maine politician) =

American politician

Thomas H. Martin Jr.

Member of the Maine House of Representatives from the 57th district
- Incumbent
- Assumed office December 5, 2018
- Preceded by: Stephen Wood

Member of the Maine Senate from the 25th district
- In office December 1, 2010 – December 5, 2012
- Preceded by: Lisa Marrache
- Succeeded by: Colleen Lachowicz

Personal details
- Party: Republican
- Profession: Businessperson

Thomas H. Martin Jr. is an American politician and businessperson serving in the Maine House of Representatives as Representative from the 57th district.

== Political career ==
=== Maine Senate ===
Martin served as a Republican State Senator from Maine's 25th District, representing much of Kennebec County, including the population centers of Waterville and Winslow as well as two communities in Somerset County, including Pittsfield. At that time he was a resident of Benton, Maine. He was first elected to the Maine State Senate in 2010 and defeated for re-election in 2012 by Colleen Lachowicz. During his re-election campaign, the Maine Republican Party criticized Lachowicz for comments she made while playing World of Warcraft. After the criticism received national attention, gamers donated $6,300 to two PACs supporting Lachowicz. Overall, $181,000 was spent to oppose Martin's re-election. Lachowicz won her hometown of Waterville by more than 1,900 votes and the district by approximately 900.

=== Maine House of Representatives ===
After Leslie Gibson, the sole 2018 candidate for District 57 of the Maine State House withdrew in the wake of a nationwide uproar over his insults of Stoneman Douglas High School shooting survivors X González and David Hogg, Martin announced that he would run for the seat, stating that Gibson's remarks did not represent the Maine Republican Party, and that he planned to contact the survivors to commend their courage. Martin said that while he had contemplated a run for office, he had not intended to run for any office in 2018, since he and his wife had newly moved to this area, and had just adopted a child.

== Personal life ==
Martin's private experience is primarily in the field of construction and excavation. He is a graduate of Central Maine Technical College. He now lives in Greene, Maine. In a March 2018 interview, Martin said he and his new wife had moved to Greene "because it proved a good midway point for their respective jobs."
