= Jim Donnelly (politician) =

American politician and businessperson

James O. Donnelly (born 1967) is an American politician and businessperson from Presque Isle, Maine. Donnelly was elected at age 23 to the Maine House of Representatives as a Republican. He served four two-year terms and was unable to seek re-election in 1998 due to the newly initiated term-limits. During his final term in the Legislature, Donnelly was elected Minority Leader of the House of Representatives. At age 30, he was the youngest person to hold such a title in the United States at the time.

In 2002, Donnelly was appointed treasurer of the Loring Development Authority board of trustees, which oversees the redevelopment of Loring Air Force Base in Limestone, Maine.
