= Henry Beck (politician) =

American politician

52nd Treasurer of Maine
- In office January 2, 2019 – January 9, 2025
- Governor: Janet Mills
- Preceded by: Terry Hayes
- Succeeded by: Joe Perry

Member of the Maine House of Representatives
- In office December 3, 2014 – December 7, 2016
- Preceded by: Thomas Tyler
- Succeeded by: Colleen Madigan
- Constituency: 110th district
- In office December 3, 2008 – December 3, 2014
- Preceded by: Marilyn Canavan
- Succeeded by: Gary Hilliard
- Constituency: 76th district

Personal details
- Born: Henry E. Murphy Beck; June 6, 1986 (age 40) Waterville, Maine, U.S.
- Party: Democratic
- Education: Colby College (BA); University of Maine, Portland (JD)

Henry E. Murphy Beck (born June 6, 1986) is an American lawyer and Democratic politician from Waterville, Maine. He has served as Maine State Treasurer since 2019.

== Biography ==
Beck graduated from Waterville High School and from Colby College. He served on the Waterville City Council.

=== Maine House of Representatives ===
Beck served in the Maine House of Representatives representing District 110 from December 2008 until December 2016. In 2011 he was appointed to serve on the Commission to Apportion Maine's Congressional Districts. He served as the Chair of Joint Standing Committee on Insurance and Financial Services.

=== Maine State Senate campaign ===
He was term-limited in 2016, running instead for the Maine State Senate. He lost to the incumbent, Republican Scott Cyrway. He was succeeded in the House by fellow Democrat Colleen Madigan, whom Cyrway had unseated from the Senate two years before.

=== State Treasurer ===
A former Democratic lawmaker, Beck was elected Maine State Treasurer on December 6, 2018, after the Democrats reclaimed both houses of the Maine Legislature. He defeated incumbent Treasurer Terry Hayes, an independent backed by the Republicans. He assumed office on January 2, 2019. Beck declined to run for reelection as Treasurer in 2024.

In 2023, Beck announced a possibility of an upgrade to Maine's credit rating, based on increased reserves and improved budgeting.

=== Other activities ===
During the 2020 Democratic Party presidential primaries, Beck endorsed former South Bend, Indiana, mayor Pete Buttigieg.

Political offices
Preceded by Terry Hayes	Treasurer of Maine; 2019–2025	Succeeded by Joe Perry
