= Carol McElwee =

American politician and teacher

Member of the Maine House of Representatives for the 4th District (Fort Fairfield)
- Incumbent
- Assumed office December 2012

Personal details
- Party: Republican
- Profession: Teacher

Carol McElwee is an American politician and teacher from Maine. A Republican, Mcelwee has served in the Maine House of Representatives since 2012. She is a teacher of English at the Adult Education Center in Caribou, Maine.
