= Colleen Madigan =

American politician and social worker

Member of the Maine House of Representatives from the 64th district
- In office December 7, 2022 – December 4, 2024
- Preceded by: Laurel Libby
- Succeeded by: Flavia M. DeBrito

Member of the Maine House of Representatives from the 110th district
- In office December 7, 2016 – December 7, 2022
- Preceded by: Henry Beck
- Succeeded by: Stephen Moriarty

Member of the Maine Senate from the 25th district
- In office December 5, 2012 – December 3, 2014
- Preceded by: Tom Martin
- Succeeded by: Scott Cyrway

Personal details
- Born: January 22, 1964 (age 62)
- Party: Democratic
- Profession: Social worker

Colleen Madigan (born January 22, 1964; formerly Lachowicz) is an American politician and social worker from Maine. Under the name Colleen Lachowicz, the Democrat from Waterville was elected to the Maine Senate from the 25th district. Her race attracted international attention when the Republican Party of Maine issued press releases condemning her for playing the online video game World of Warcraft, claiming her "disturbing alter-ego" and "time-consuming double life" made her unfit to hold public office. She was defeated for re-election two years later by Republican Scott Cyrway.

She returned to her maiden name, Colleen Madigan, in 2014, and was elected to the Maine House of Representatives's District 110 in 2016, winning with 2,305 votes to 1,661 for Republican Mark Andre. Democratic incumbent Henry Beck was not a candidate for re-election, and Madigan was unopposed in the primary. She was re-elected in the 110th district in 2018 and 2020. She won her fourth term in 2022 for the 64th district after redistricting. She was term-limited in 2024, and succeeded by fellow Democrat Flavia M. DeBrito.

== Background ==
Colleen was born on January 22, 1964. According to her campaign biography, Lachowicz had been working since she was 15 years old. After graduating from William Paterson College with a bachelor's degree in sociology in 1987, she worked with adults with mental illness, then spent a year in Eastern Europe providing supportive counseling services to international students. She returned to the U.S., and earned a Master of Social Work from Boston College in 1999. She has spent 25 years as a social worker and lives in Waterville.

== 2012 election ==
Lachowicz, a long-time Democratic activist and advocate on women's issues, won a June 12, 2012 primary election against Dana Hernandez, with 827 votes (52.3%) to Hernandez' 755 (47.7%). She faced Martin, who ran unopposed in his own primary, on November 6, 2012. The 25th district covers Albion, Benton, Clinton, Unity Township, Waterville and Winslow in Kennebec County, and Detroit and Pittsfield in Somerset County.

=== Attack on Lachowicz and gaming ===
The website "Colleen's World" was set up by the Republican Party of Maine to "out" her as a player of the massively multiplayer online role-playing game (MMORPG) World of Warcraft (her "main" character was a level 85 orc rogue named Santiaga). The site displayed several messages posted by Lachowicz to sites such as The Daily Kos, stating her desire to "go and hunt down Grover Norquist and drown HIM in [her] bathtub" (referencing a comment Norquist made on shrinking the government "to the size where we can drown it in the bathtub") and comments about stabbing and poisons (in World of Warcraft, rogues rely heavily on daggers and poisons). The website said "In Colleen's online fantasy world, she gets away with crude, vicious and violent comments" and "Maine needs a State Senator that lives in the real world, not in Colleen's fantasy world." They also sent out a press release titled "Disturbing Alter-Ego Revealed" which accused her of living a "time-consuming double life."

In response, Lachowicz said, "I think it's weird that I'm being targeted for playing online games. Apparently I'm in good company since there are 183 million other Americans who also enjoy online games. What's next? Will I be ostracized for playing Angry Birds or Words with Friends?" She added, "What's really weird is that the Republicans are going after my hobbies instead of talking about their record while they've been running Augusta for the last two years. Instead of talking about what they're doing for Maine people, they're making fun of me for playing video games. Did you know that more people over the age of 50 play video games than under the age of 18? As a gamer, I'm in good company with folks like Jodie Foster, Vin Diesel, Mike Myers, and Robin Williams. Maybe it's the Republican Party that is out of touch."

Martin said he was unaware of the party's attacks on Lachowicz until contacted by reporters, and he didn't condone them. Both candidates were declared "clean election candidates", meaning they were both pledged to abstain from negative campaigning, and could only spend the amount they receive from public financing and a limited amount of donations. A number of gamers raised money for organizations which support Lachowicz' candidacy, since her campaign could not solicit or receive any donations; but she said she would rather not become the poster girl for a game she had almost completely stopped playing due to time pressure. The Maine Republican Party filed an ethics complaint, alleging that she cheated by posting on the ActBlue website, and claiming that this constituted improperly coordinating with political action committees to solicit campaign contributions. The bipartisan Maine Ethics Commission rejected this accusation by a 5-0 vote in Lachowicz's favor.

The attacks attracted international attention, including articles from Time, the BBC, Forbes, Slate, Politico and a piece on the satirical news program The Colbert Report. After the controversy broke, she told the press that she had had to put her WoW playing on hold due to time pressure; but Blizzard Entertainment, she said, had sent her a copy of Mists of Pandaria, the latest WoW expansion pack, signed by the entire development team, and she hoped to play it after catching up on lost sleep.

=== Endorsements ===
On October 11, 2012, the Democratic Legislative Campaign Committee declared Lachowicz one of their "2012 Essential Races: Grassroots Nominees", stating that she had received the second-largest number of nominations from grassroots activists. Referencing the World of Warcraft attack, the DLCC claimed that the controversy had made hers "perhaps the most nationally-watched legislative race in the country right now".

=== Outcome ===
Lachowicz was the winner in the general election, unseating Martin with 8,666 votes to his 7,753. Her overwhelming majority in Waterville (4,224 to 2,318) overcame her opponent's narrow leads in all the other municipalities: he won Winslow by 2,007-1,921, Pittsfield 990-702, Detroit 179-163, Clinton 837-705, Benton 824-579; and Albion 598-372.
