= Eliot Cutler =

American politician, lawyer, and convicted felon

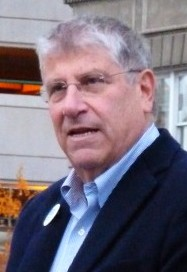
- Cutler in 2010

Personal details
- Born: Eliot Raphael Cutler; July 29, 1946 (age 80) Bangor, Maine, U.S.
- Party: Independent
- Spouse: Melanie Stewart
- Children: 2
- Education: Harvard University (BA); Georgetown University (JD)

Eliot Raphael Cutler (born July 29, 1946) is an American former lawyer, political candidate, and sex offender. He was twice an Independent candidate in Maine's 2010 and 2014 gubernatorial races. In 2010, he placed second in a multi-way race, receiving 208,270 votes, equaling 35.9%, narrowly losing to Republican Paul LePage. In 2014, he garnered only 8.4%, placing third behind both Democratic candidate Mike Michaud as well as LePage, who was re-elected with 48.2% of the vote. Cutler had previously served in the Presidential administration of Democrat Jimmy Carter as part of the U.S. Office of Management and Budget.

In May 2023, Cutler pled guilty to four counts of possessing child pornography, after being arrested in March 2022. He was released in 2024 on good conduct time, after serving seven months. Since September 2025, Cutler has been arrested multiple times for various probation violations. He pleaded guilty to three probation violations in May 2026, and was sentenced to six months in jail in September of that year.

== Early life and career ==
Cutler was born and raised in a Jewish family in Bangor, Maine, the eldest son of Lawrence and Catherine Cutler. His father was a physician, and his mother was an economist.

Cutler received secondary education at Deerfield Academy. He then proceeded to graduate from Harvard College and later earned a degree from Georgetown Law.

Cutler began his career as a legislative assistant to Maine U.S. Senator Edmund Muskie, helping craft the Clean Water Act and the Clean Air Act.

He served as associate director for Natural Resources, Energy and Science in the Office of Management and Budget in the Carter administration, and was the principal White House official for energy.

He then worked from 1980 to 1988 for the law firm Webster & Sheffield, focusing mostly on environmental and land use issues.

He was a founding partner of Cutler & Stanfield LLP, with fellow Webster & Sheffield associate Jeffrey Stanfield, which became the second-largest environmental law firm in the country, eventually merging that practice with international firm Akin Gump in 2000.

In 1990, Cutler purchased property on Shore Road in Cape Elizabeth. In an interview with Portland Magazine, Cutler recounted the purchase, "It took two years to find this property. Once we saw it and bought it, we wanted to build a house that sat well on land and was not overly imposing, from the road or the water. We needed lots of room for us and our family, a growing family over time, where we could gather family and friends to enjoy the Maine Coast with us." Cutler resided in Cape Elizabeth with his wife, Melanie Stewart Cutler, during his gubernatorial campaigns. They have two adult children. In 2006, Cutler moved to Beijing, where he acquired a collection of Chinese vernacular furniture and antiques. When he moved back to his home in Cape Elizabeth, he integrated the Far East influence with the Maine mystique of the residence. In May 2017, Cutler put his 15,455 square feet (1,435.8 m^{2}) oceanfront home in Cape Elizabeth for sale for $11 million, citing his intention to move to a condominium in nearby Portland and also to look for a place on the water in Maine. At the end of 2020, the home was purchased by Jonathan S. Bush.

== Electoral career ==
=== 2010 gubernatorial campaign ===
Cutler carried Cumberland, Hancock, Knox, and Sagadahoc counties in his 2010 campaign for governor.

On December 9, 2009, Cutler officially launched his campaign for governor of Maine. Had he been elected, he would have been Maine's third independent governor. He was endorsed by Maine's second Independent governor, Angus King.

Despite polling in the low teens as late as mid-October, Cutler surged in the final weeks of the campaign, with the final five polls of the race showing Cutler either tied with or ahead of Democratic candidate Libby Mitchell. In a close election-night race, Cutler took an early lead. As the results came in from Maine's smaller and more rural communities, Cutler's lead shrank, and eventually Republican opponent Paul LePage took the lead. Based on early, unofficial results, the Bangor Daily News projected that LePage would win, and Cutler conceded on the morning after the election. LePage ultimately defeated Cutler by 9,795 votes.

=== 2014 gubernatorial campaign ===
On June 6, 2013, Cutler announced on radio station WGAN's morning show that he would again run for governor, with a formal announcement coming after Labor Day. He dismissed the suggestion that his candidacy would result in another LePage victory, stating that he wouldn't run if he didn't think he could win. Unlike in his 2010 campaign, where he polled poorly at first before strengthening as the campaign progressed, Cutler started out the 2014 campaign polling strongly before fading down the stretch. He only polled higher than 16% once after October, and the final poll of the campaign showed Cutler with just 9% of the vote, significantly behind LePage and Democratic candidate Mike Michaud, who were statistically tied. While he was again endorsed by Angus King, now a U.S. Senator, King withdrew his endorsement on October 29 in favor of Michaud.

Ultimately, Cutler finished a distant third, garnering just 8.4% of the vote, with LePage winning reelection. Despite carrying four counties and dozens of municipalities in his 2010 campaign, Cutler failed to win a single county or municipality in his 2014 bid. Though many Democrats believe that Cutler was a two-time spoiler, it is a label he and his supporters reject.

== Other political involvement ==
He served on the board of directors of Americans Elect, a nonprofit 501(c)(4) corporation which sought to gain ballot access for a presidential ticket, to be chosen through an online national primary, in every state in the 2012 presidential election.

Cutler endorsed Angus King in the 2012 U.S. Senate election to succeed the retiring Olympia Snowe. King won the election.

Since the 2014 election, the second in a row in which the governor was elected with less than a majority, Maine became the first state in the country to introduce ranked choice voting in its election, with the multi-way race between LePage, Cutler, and the Democratic candidate often being seen as an impetus for this action. Cutler had been a proponent of this system during the 2010 election, believing he would have won if it had been implemented then. However, due to the state constitution's rules on gubernatorial elections, ranked choice voting is not allowed to be used for the position.

Cutler announced on April 2, 2015, that he would not run for governor again, stating that he was taking a "vow of abstinence" from doing so. He also announced his appointment by the University of Maine System to lead the creation of a new graduate center unifying existing graduate programs at the University of Southern Maine, University of Maine, and the University of Maine School of Law.

In May 2017, Cutler announced that he would work with the political organization Maine Independents to recruit candidates for the 2018 elections. The organization was founded by supporters of Cutler's gubernatorial campaigns. He also announced his support for State Treasurer Terry Hayes for governor in the following year's gubernatorial election. Hayes would be defeated in that election, which was won by Democrat Janet Mills.

== Legal issues ==
In March 2022, Cutler was arrested in Hancock County and charged with four counts of possessing child pornography. He agreed to plead guilty on May 2, 2023, to four counts of possession of sexually explicit material, and was sentenced to nine months in jail, with 10 additional years of probation and a $5,000 fine. Prosecutors accepted the plea deal due to Cutler's age and the amount of time a trial could take. He was formally convicted on May 5 and reported to the Hancock County Jail on June 1. He was released early on January 18, 2024, on good conduct time. Following his release, Cutler is required to register as a sex offender for life.

=== 2025–26 arrests ===
In September 2025, Cutler was accused of violating his probation by accessing escort websites and having two unmonitored cellphones. He was released on $1,000 bail, subject to a random search of his home, and had to submit an inventory of all electronic devices in his possession.

In January 2026, Cutler turned himself in to the Hancock County Jail after he was accused of violating his probation for a second time, with prosecutors accusing him of viewing sexually explicit material on December 28, 2025, and January 2, 2026. He was released on $10,000 bail. Under the terms of bail, he was only allowed to access the internet when approved by his probation officer, and was forbidden from accessing any material that depicts a nude person.

On February 9, 2026, Cutler was again arrested for a probation violation by Maine State Police after officers discovered him at a South Portland hotel during an unrelated investigation. It was the third time he had been accused of a probation violation in five months. Cutler was accused of possessing pornographic DVDs depicting adults, which are legal in Maine but a violation of his probation. Following his latest arrest, Cutler was "unsatisfactorily discharged" from a court-ordered sexual behavior treatment course, which marked his fourth probation violation. On April 8, Cutler was denied bail and remanded into the Hancock County Jail pending a May hearing to determine if he had violated his probation. He had been held at the Hancock County Jail since his February 9 arrest.

On April 22, Cutler was again accused of violating his probation, after allegedly refusing to give the correct password to access encrypted files on his computer. Both his refusal to provide a password and his encryption of files on his computer violate his probation.

On May 22, Cutler pleaded guilty to three probation violations while the state dropped a fourth. He was released on $10,000 bail, and a hearing on the fifth probation violation was continued to June 1.

On June 11, Cutler was arrested for a sixth probation violation. His attorney told the Bangor Daily News that Cutler had been arrested for "failing to sign a probation treatment plan document that had internet restrictions that were completely inconsistent with what the court specifically ordered last week." On September 18, Cutler was sentenced to six months in jail for his various probation violations, with the 107 days he had served at various points throughout 2026 being counted towards his sentence. He reported to the Hancock County Jail on October 15.
