= Helen Rankin (Maine politician) =

American politician (1931–2022)

Member of the Maine House of Representatives for the 97th District
- In office December 2008 – December 2014

Personal details
- Born: November 23, 1931 Hiram, Maine, U.S.
- Died: August 12, 2022 (aged 90) Gorham, Maine, U.S.
- Party: Democrat
- Profession: Retired School Nutrition Director

Helen E.E. (Brown) Rankin (November 23, 1931 – August 12, 2022) was an American politician from Maine. A Democrat, Rankin served in the Maine House of Representatives from 2008 until 2014. Rankin represented District 97, which included the Oxford County towns of Brownfield, Fryeburg, Hiram, Parsonsfield and Porter. Rankin died on August 12, 2022, at the age of 90.
