= Pan Atlantic =

Studio album by Bobby Previte
- Released: November 1, 2009
- Genre: Jazz
- Length: 60:21
- Label: Palmetto
- Producer: Bobby Previte

Pan Atlantic is a studio album by New York City jazz drummer Bobby Previte.

== Track listing ==
1. "Deep Lake" 10:17
2. "Stay on Path" 5:39
3. "The Eternity Clause" 8:11
4. "Destruction Layer" 8:47
5. "Pan Atlantic" 8:55
6. "Question Mark" 7:09
7. "Veltin" 8:37

== Personnel ==
- Gianluca Petrella: trombone;
- Wolfgang Puschnig: alto & baritone saxophone;
- Benoît Delbecq: fender rhodes;
- Nils Davidsen: bass;
- Bobby Previte: drums, fender rhodes (7);
