= Charlotte Warren =

American politician

Charlotte May Warren

Member of the Maine House of Representatives
- Incumbent
- Assumed office December 2014

Mayor of Hallowell, Maine

Personal details
- Party: Democratic
- Education: University of Maine at Farmington; University of Southern Maine; University of New England
- Occupation: Politician

Charlotte May Warren is an American politician from Maine. Warren, a Democrat from Hallowell, Maine, was elected to the Maine House of Representatives in November 2014.

Warren was born and raised on a farm in Pittston, Maine. She was a first generation college student when she graduated from the University of Maine at Farmington in 1994 with a B.A. in psychology. She earned a M.S. in adult education from the University of Southern Maine and a M.S.W. in Organizational/Community Practice from the University of New England.

Prior to her election to the Maine Legislature, Warren served on the Hallowell City Council, including 5 years as mayor.

In 2021, Warren apologized for saying that straight white men "are too emotional to be in politics" on social media.
