= Joan Welsh =

American politician

Joan W. Welsh (born June 17, 1940) is an American politician. She served in the Maine House of Representatives for the 94th District, representing Camden, Rockport, and Islesboro from 2008 until 2016. She is a member of the Democratic Party. District 94 used to be District 46, until the rezoning of districts came along shortly after 2012.

- Representative of Maine's 94th District (Camden, Rockport, and Islesboro)
- House Chair of the Joint Standing Committee on Environment and Natural Resources

== Previous work ==
- Welsh was the CEO and President of Hurricane Island Outward Bound
- Former director of student and academic affairs Rockport College (in Maine)
- Served as the deputy director of the Natural Resources Council of Maine

Welsh has served, and does serve on many other non-profit organizations mainly in the midcoast area of Maine.

== Education ==
Joan Welsh attended Pomona College and University of Colorado. She has a bachelor's degree in English.
