= Maine Republican Party =

Maine affiliate of the Republican Party

- Chairperson: Jim Deyermond
- Senate Leader: Trey Stewart
- House Leader: Billy Bob Faulkingham
- Founded: August 7, 1854
- Headquarters: 9 Higgins Street; Augusta, Maine 04330
- Membership (2026): ▼273,800
- Ideology: Conservatism
- National affiliation: Republican Party
- Colors: Red
- Seats in the U.S. Senate: 1 / 2
- Seats in the U.S. House: 0 / 2
- Seats in the Maine Senate: 15 / 35
- Seats in the Maine House: 73 / 151
- Nonvoting seats in the Maine House: 0 / 3
- Executive offices (Note: Governor, Attorney General, Secretary of State, Treasurer): 0 / 4

Election symbol

Website
- mainegop.com

The Maine Republican Party is an affiliate of the United States Republican Party in Maine. It was founded in Strong, Maine, on August 7, 1854. The party currently does not control the governor's office or either chamber of the Maine Legislature, nor either of Maine's two U.S. House. The only federal elected office that the party controls is one of Maine's two U.S. Senate seats, currently held by Susan Collins.

== Party history ==
The Republican Party formed in Maine in 1854 due to Prohibition and the abolitionist movement. Hannibal Hamlin left the Democratic Party because of the slavery issue and helped form the Republican Party. He was the state's first Republican governor. In 1860, he became the first Republican vice president after Abraham Lincoln won the presidency.

From the 1860s until 1900, James G. Blaine rose as a dominant Republican figure. He was the Speaker of the U.S. House of Representatives, a U.S. Senator, and Secretary of State for three Republican administrations. He ran for president in 1884 but lost to Grover Cleveland. In the late 1800s, Thomas B. Reed served in the House of Representatives for three terms. He started many reforms and was sometimes referred to as "Czar Reed". "Reed's Rules of Order" are still used in Maine Legislatures.

Except for rare lapses, the Republicans dominated Maine politics until 1954, when young progressives from the Democratic Party gained strength.

Margaret Chase Smith was the first American woman elected to serve in both houses of Congress (elected to the House of Representatives in 1940 and the Senate in 1948). In 1964, she was placed in the nomination for presidency at the Republican National Convention.

On August 19, 2013, the resignation of seven members of the State Committee, viewed as libertarian and conservative, was announced along with their unenrollment from the Party. Those who resigned cited numerous grievances with the Party at both the state and national levels, including Party rule changes, support from Congressional Republicans of National Security Agency surveillance programs, and the failure of Legislative Republicans to block tax increases in the recently passed State budget.

== Current officeholders ==
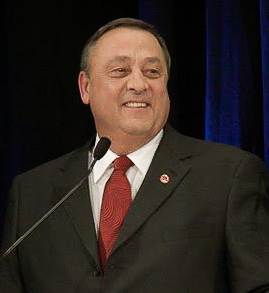
Paul LePage is the former Governor from 2011 to 2019. His election in 2010 marked a resurgence for the Maine GOP, with the party taking a House majority for the first time since 1974 and establishing a government trifecta for the first time since 1964.

The Maine Republican Party controls no statewide state-level offices after the 2018 midterm elections. It holds a minority in the Maine Senate and the Maine House of Representatives. It also holds one of the state's U.S. Senate seats, but neither of the state's U.S. House seats.

=== Members of Congress ===
==== U.S. Senate ====
Republicans have controlled Maine's Class II seat since 1979.

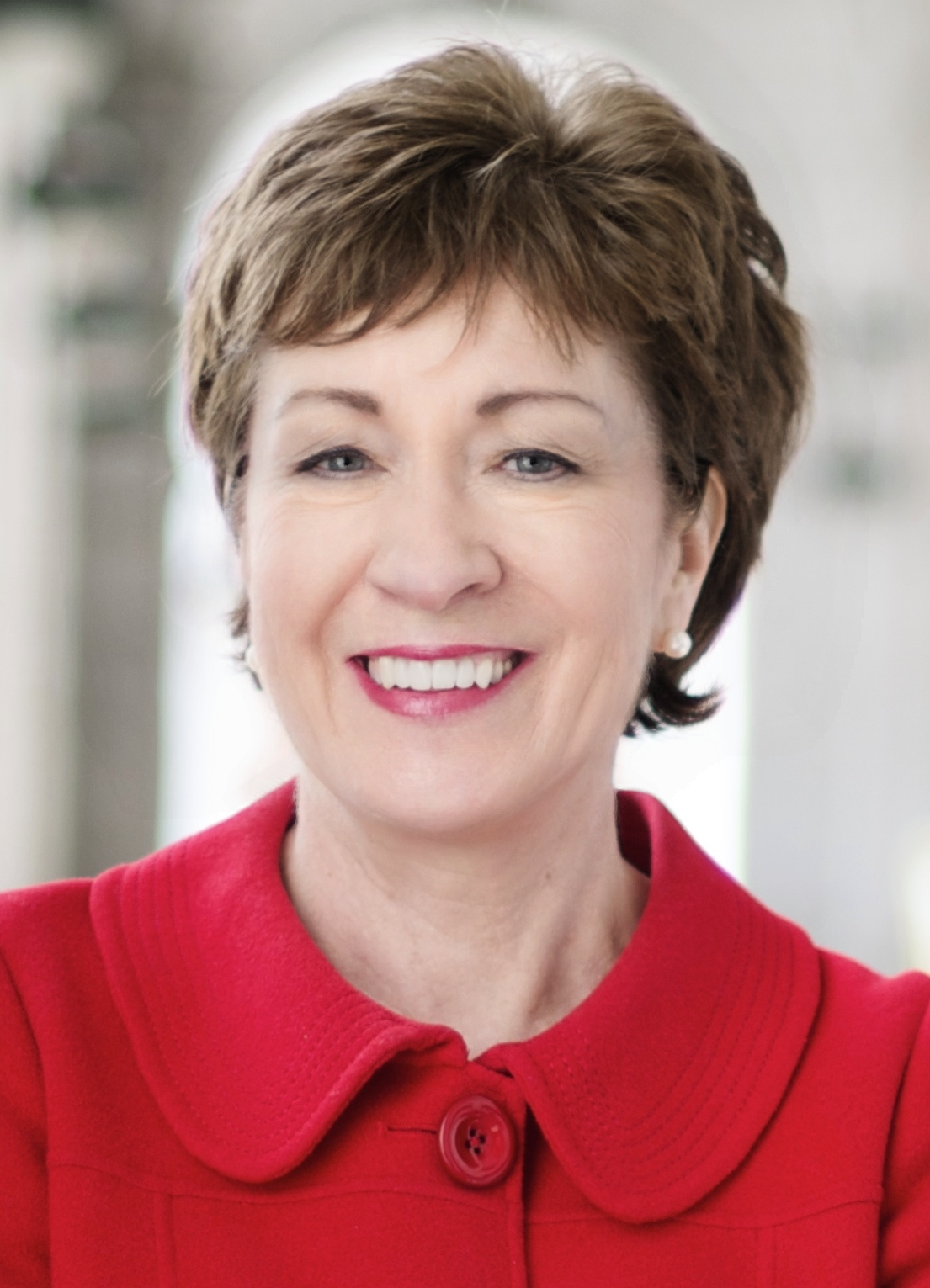
Senior U.S. Senator Susan Collins

Republicans controlled both of Maine's senate seats between 1997—the election of Collins—and 2013, with the retirement of Olympia Snowe. Snowe was replaced in the senate by independent Angus King, who caucus with the Democrats. Collins is the only Republican member of Congress from New England.

==== U.S. House of Representatives ====
| District | Member | Photo |
|---|---|---|
| 2nd | Paul LePage (elect) | |

Both of Maine's congressional districts have been held by Democrats since 2018. The last Republican to represent Maine in the House of Representatives was Bruce Poliquin. First elected in 2014, Poliquin was subsequently defeated in his bid for a third term in 2018 by Democratic challenger Jared Golden. Poliquin sought the seat again in 2022, but lost.

=== Statewide officials ===
- None

Maine has not elected a GOP Governor since 2014, when Paul LePage was re-elected as governor. In 2018, term limits prevented LePage from seeking a third consecutive term. Businessman Shawn Moody ran as the Republican nominee in the 2018 election and was subsequently defeated by Democratic challenger Janet Mills. LePage ran for governor again in 2022, but lost. No Republican candidate for governor has received a majority of the vote since 1962, when incumbent Republican John H. Reed received 50.08% of the vote.

The holders of the other three major statewide offices, the Attorney General, Secretary of State, and State Treasurer, are selected by the Legislature. As Republicans have not held a majority of total seats in the Legislature since 2012, they have been unable to select these officials on their own. They did help to elect independent Treasurer Terry Hayes, a former Democrat, in 2014.

=== State legislative leaders ===
Republicans last controlled the Maine House of Representatives in 2012, and the Maine Senate in 2018. Control of the Senate determines who is first in line to be governor in the event of a vacancy, as Maine has no office of lieutenant governor.

- Senate Leader: Trey Stewart
- House Leader: Billy Bob Faulkingham

== Controversies ==
=== 2010 ===
The Maine Republican Party caused a stir during its 2010 convention when the party, which has been moderate since the 1950s, passed a constitutionally conservative platform supported by "Tea Party" activists. The new platform calls for the elimination of the United States Department of Education and the Federal Reserve System, the rejection of the United Nations Convention on the Rights of the Child, a freeze and prohibition on stimulus spending, and the prosecution of perpetrators of the "global warming myth". It also demands a "return to the principles of Austrian Economics", and the assertion that healthcare is "not a right" but "a service" that can be addressed only by using "market based solutions". Indeed, the platform says, "The principles upon which the Republican Party was founded, to which we as Citizens seek return, and to which we demand our elected representatives abide, are summarized as follows:

1. The Constitutions, both State and Federal, are the framework to which any and all legislation must adhere.
2. State sovereignty must be regained and retained on all issues specifically relegated to the States by the constitution.
3. National sovereignty shall be preserved and retained as dominant over any attempted unconstitutional usurpations of such by international treaty.
4. It is the responsibility and duty, of "We the People", to educate both ourselves and others; to demand honest elections free of corruption, and to hold our elected officials to the highest standards of honesty, integrity and loyalty to the constitution."

=== 2012 ===
During the 2012 Maine caucuses, the Maine Republican Party received heavy criticism for mistakes and omissions in voter tallies. The Waldo County GOP Committee called for a censure of Chairman Charlie Webster for his handling of the controversy.

=== 2019 ===
On January 12, 2019, the Maine Republican Party unanimously elected Waterville Mayor Nick Isgro as the party's vice chair. Isgro's election came less than a year after his controversial tweet telling Parkland school shooting survivor David Hogg to "eat it" prompted nationwide attention and an effort to recall him as mayor. Ultimately, Isgro prevailed in the recall election, retaining his position as mayor by a margin of 91 votes.
