= BCS =

BCS may refer to:

== American football ==
- Bowl Championship Series, a system that selected matchups for major college football bowl games between 1998 and 2013
- BCS conferences, the six FBS conferences with automatic major bowl bids under that system; since superseded by the Power Five conferences
- BCS National Championship Game, the bowl game determining the national championship team under that system

== Education ==
- Bachelor of Computer Science
- Bachelor of Commercial Science
- Bangor Christian Schools, Bangor, Maine, United States
- Berlin Cosmopolitan School, Berlin, Land Berlin, Germany
- Bishop Cotton School (disambiguation)
- Bishop's College School, Lennoxville, Sherbrooke, Québec, Canada
- Bullis Charter School, a public charter school in Los Altos, California, United States

== Organisation ==
- Balochistan Civil Service
- Bangladesh Civil Service
- Bangladesh Computer Society
- Bloc of Communists and Socialists, a Moldovan electoral alliance
- Bond Christen Socialisten, a Dutch political party
- Boston Computer Society, a defunct group
- British Cartographic Society, promoting the art and science of mapmaking
- British Computer Society, a chartered professional/academic association for IT practitioners
- British Cardiovascular Society, a healthcare association for professionals working in the field of cardiology

== Publications ==
- BCS: 50 Years, a 2010 review volume published by World Scientific
- Beneath Ceaseless Skies, a fantasy magazine
- Buddhist-Christian Studies, a scholarly journal

== Science ==
- BCS theory of conventional superconductivity, named for Bardeen, Cooper, and Schrieffer
- Biopharmaceutics Classification System, a guidance for predicting the intestinal drug absorption
- Breast-conserving surgery, a surgical procedure less radical than mastectomy

== Codes ==
- BCS, the IATA code for Southern Seaplane Airport in the state of Louisiana, US
- BCS, the ICAO code for European Air Transport (Belgium), a defunct cargo airline
- BCS, the National Rail code for Bicester North railway station in the county of Oxfordshire, UK
- BCS, the NYSE stock ticker symbol for Barclays plc, a UK-based bank

== Other ==
- Battery Computer System, a small computer used by the US Army for computing artillery fire mission data
- Baja California Sur, state of Mexico
- Bosnian-Croatian-Serbian or Serbo-Croatian, a pluricentric South Slavic language
- Brigata Curva Sud, ultras supporters group, fanatical supporters of the PSS Sleman football club
- British Crime Survey, an independent study of crime in the UK
- Bryan-College Station metropolitan area (usually styled as B/CS), a metropolitan area in Texas
- Better Call Saul, TV series
