= Sean Faircloth =

American writer and politician

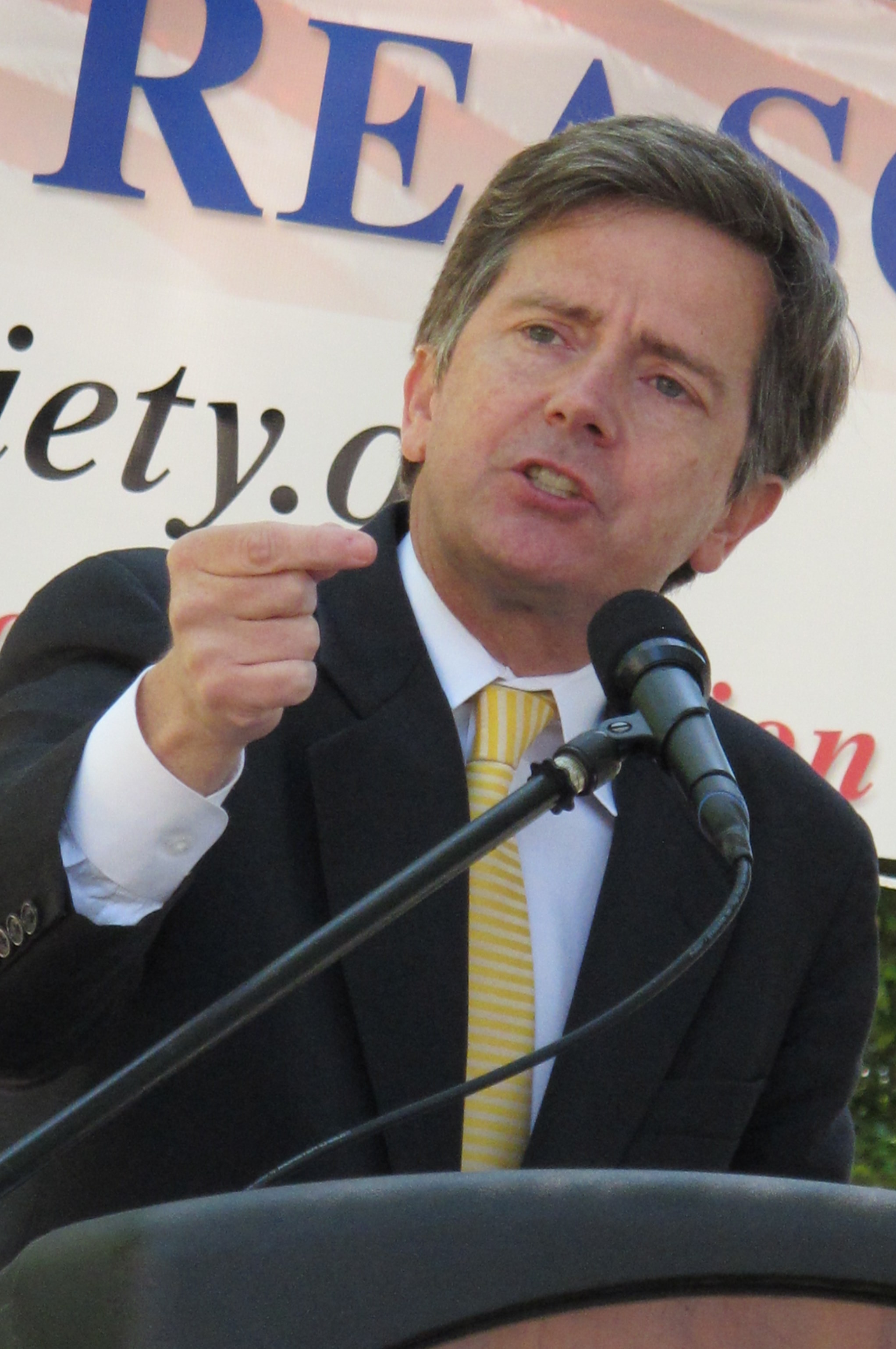
- Faircloth in 2011

Member of the Maine House of Representatives
- Incumbent
- Assumed office February 25, 2025
- Preceded by: Joe Perry
- Constituency: 24th district
- In office December 1, 2004 – December 3, 2008
- Preceded by: Nancy Sullivan
- Succeeded by: Sara Stevens
- Constituency: 17th district
- In office December 4, 2002 – December 1, 2004
- Preceded by: Christina Baker
- Succeeded by: Joseph Brannigan
- Constituency: 117th district
- In office December 2, 1992 – December 7, 1994
- Preceded by: Joseph A. Garland
- Succeeded by: Lisa Lumbra
- Constituency: 118th district

Member of the Maine Senate from the 9th district
- In office December 7, 1994 – December 4, 1996
- Preceded by: John Baldacci
- Succeeded by: Robert E. Murray Jr.

Personal details
- Born: May 23, 1960 (age 66)
- Party: Democratic
- Education: University of Notre Dame; University of California, Hastings College of the Law
- Profession: Attorney; Politician

Sean Faircloth (born May 23, 1960) is an American writer, attorney and politician from Maine. A Democrat, Faircloth is currently a member of the Maine House of Representatives from the 24th district following a 2025 special election. Previously, he served as the State Senator from the ninth district, State Representative from the 17th, 117th, and 118th districts, and as Mayor of Bangor, Maine. While in the legislature, Faircloth was appointed to the Judiciary and Appropriations Committees. From 2006 to 2008, Faircloth was Majority Whip in the Maine House.

Faircloth's first book published by Pitchstone Press, Attack of the Theocrats! How the Religious Right Harms Us All - and What We Can Do About It was released in February 2012. His second book, The Enchanted Globe, a fantasy adventure story that teaches geography, was published in 2016.

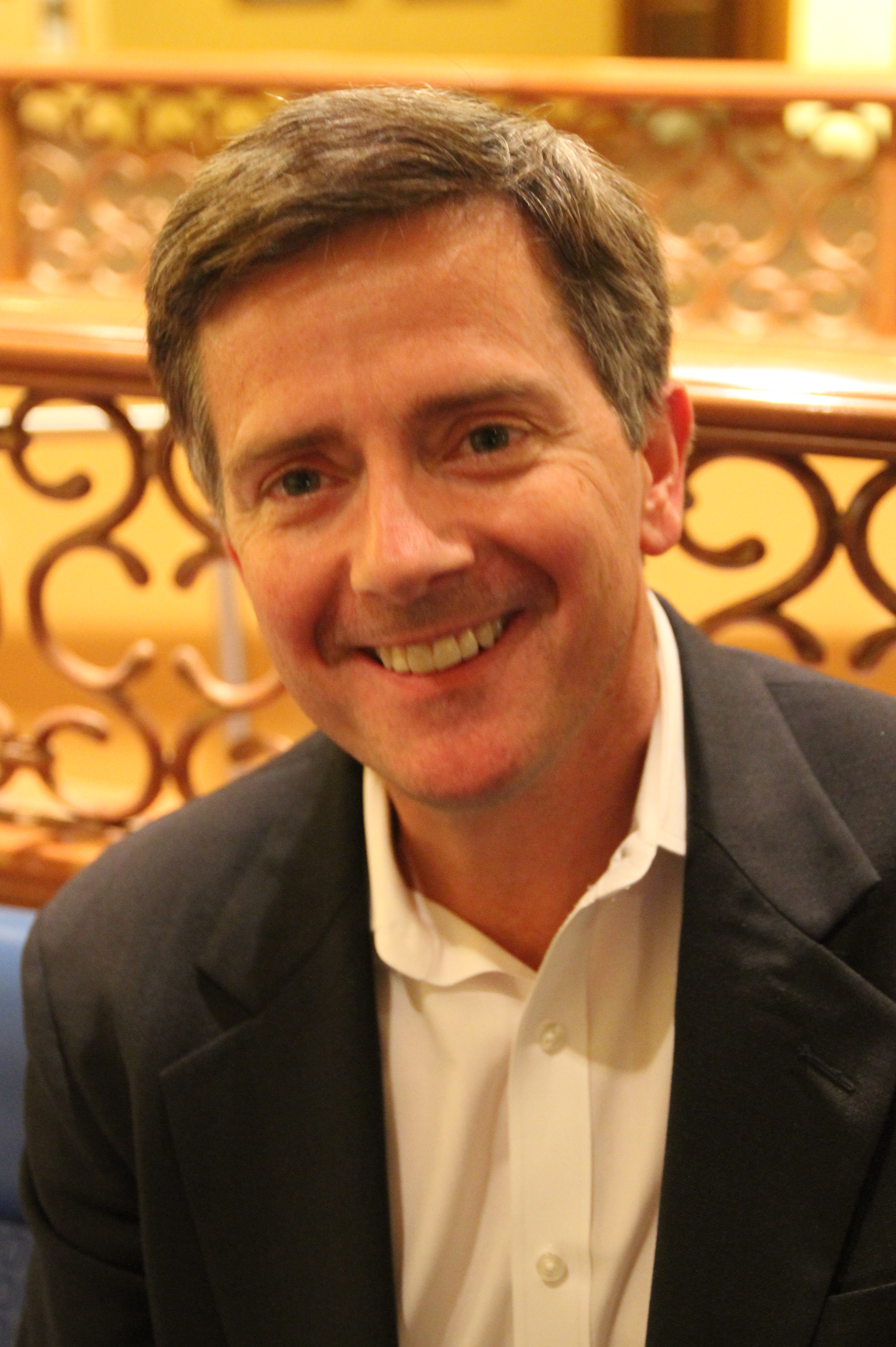
July 13, 2011 at The Amazing Meeting

Faircloth had the idea for the Maine Discovery Museum in 1996 and led the project from concept to completion in 2001. It was credited with sparking downtown revitalization. Maine Discovery Museum was then the second largest children's museum outside Boston in New England. In 2016, Environment Maine recognized Faircloth with a gold medal in the "Mayor's Climate Olympics" for his residential rebate program, "EnergySmartBangor".

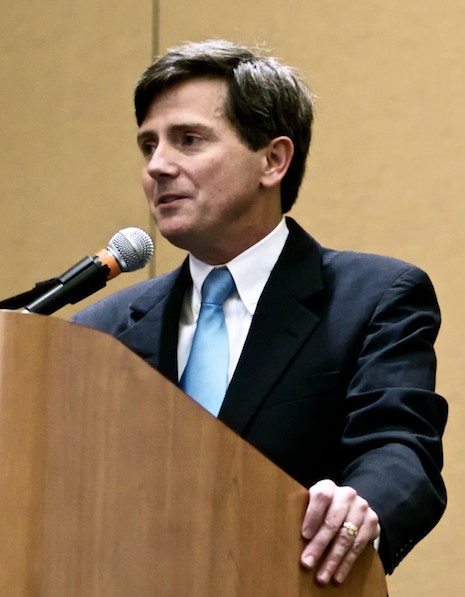
Faircloth in Burbank, California (2009)

== Political career ==
Faircloth was first elected to the Maine House of Representatives from the 118th district, representing Bangor, in 1992. He defeated incumbent Republican Joseph A. Garland by a 65.9%–33.1% margin. In 1994, he would be elected to the Maine Senate from the ninth district, representing Bangor and Veazie, by a 56.4%–43.6% margin. He replaced John Baldacci, who had been elected to the United States Congress that same year. He was not a candidate for re-election in 1996, instead running for the United States Senate seat being vacated by Republican William Cohen. Faircloth would come in second in the Democratic primary, getting 24.9% of the vote to former governor Joseph Brennan's 56.7%.

Faircloth returned to the legislature in 2002, winning election to the 117th district, representing a portion of Bangor. He would be re-elected in 2004 and 2006, in the renumbered 17th district. During his tenure, Faircloth successfully spearheaded over thirty laws, including the so-called Deadbeat Dad child support law which was later incorporated into federal law. Faircloth had numerous legislative successes in children's issues and justice system reform.

In 2016, Faircloth became mayor of Bangor. He proposed and led to creation EnergySmart Bangor for residents in July 2016 to help reduce energy costs as a residential rebate program. The organization Environment Maine selected Faircloth as the recipient of a gold medal in the "Climate Olympics," for his outspoken advocacy for renewable energy sources. Environment Maine is a "nationwide program that recognizes leaders who promote clean and renewable energy options." Mayor Faircloth initiated the Maine Multi-Cultural Center, securing the support of numerous businesses, in order to address the problem of loss of working-age population by welcoming New Americans.

On January 27, 2018, Faircloth launched his campaign to become the next governor of Maine. On February 24, he dropped out of the campaign, citing his likely inability to receive public financing. He endorsed former House Speaker Mark Eves.

On February 25, 2025, Faircloth made his return to electoral politics, winning a special election to the vacant 24th Maine House district, representing portions of Bangor, Veazie, Brewer, and Orono. He received over 70% of the vote.

== Maine Discovery Museum ==
In 1996, Faircloth had the idea for the Maine Discovery Museum and led that project through completion of the $4.5 million facility in 2001. Maine Discovery Museum served as a lynchpin of downtown revitalization. Then-Congressman John Baldacci said that Maine Discovery Museum "restored the heart" to downtown Bangor. At that time, the Maine Discovery Museum was the largest children's museum outside Boston in New England. Capital Campaign Director Martha Dudman stated, "Sean Faircloth's determination and attention to detail is what has made this project as successful as it has been."

The energy and pride that we experienced in the establishment of the Maine Discovery Museum has been repeated over and over with the University of Maine Museum of Art, the library expansion and the Bangor Museum and Center for History. That pride in our community is exactly why we see the national exposure and enthusiasm to have major events like the National Folk Festival in a city our size.

— Former Bangor Mayor John Rohman - October 3, 2003

== Children's advocacy ==
Faircloth led the creation of Maine's Healthy Start child abuse prevention initiative, and sponsored the first law making possession of child pornography a crime in Maine.

"For his legislative accomplishments in the prevention of child sex abuse, and the healthy start child abuse prevention initiative, and for spearheading the deadbeat dad child support law," Faircloth was named Legislator of the Year by the Maine Chapter of the National Association of Social Workers in 1995, and by the Maine Psychological Association. The deadbeat dad law was incorporated into a proposal by the Clinton administration. Laura Fortman, then Maine Women's Lobby Executive Director, said of this law, "Sean took the lead in proposing his revised amendment to members of the Appropriations Committee, in disagreement with some members of his own party on the Judiciary Committee, demonstrating tenacity and leadership. This legislation provided essential economic support for low-income women and children." Maine's Chapter of the National Organization for Women said, "In his first term Sean Faircloth had a major impact on national public policy."

Faircloth received the Outstanding Advocacy Award from the Maine Association of Community Service Providers (MACSP) in 2003, in part because Faircloth twice successfully opposed cuts to children's mental health programs. MACSP President Jan Fraser said to Faircloth, "If there was ever the case that one person can make a huge difference, you are living proof." Faircloth sponsored An Act To Enhance Education Services for Blind and Visually Impaired Children, which increased pay and the number of teachers for these children, as well as paid for new equipment for education for the blind.

In 2003 Faircloth initiated a first-in-the-nation policy improving school nutrition standards 24/7 in Maine K-12 schools, preventing sale of soda from school vending machines, and leading to removing "super-sizing" from schools. For his work on child obesity policy, Faircloth was invited to speak at conferences at Harvard Medical School, Yale University, and the Centers for Disease Control. Dr. Kelly Brownell, listed in Time Magazine's 100 most influential people said, "The legislative actions Rep. Faircloth has proposed are among the most innovative in the country. I fully expect legislators to follow Sean Faircloth's lead." Because of these successes, Faircloth was named Legislator of the Year by the Maine Chapter of the American Academy of Pediatrics, 2003.

In 2004 Faircloth was appointed House Chair of a Sex Crime Commission to Improve Sex Offender Accountability, successfully enhancing penalties on fixated pedophiles while advocating moderation of sex crime registries.

In 2007 Faircloth was appointed House Chair of the Commission to Establish a Strategic Priorities Plan for Maine's Young Children, which created a prioritized plan regarding children's policy, and resulted in creation of the Maine Children's Growth Council. This Council, later designated Maine's Early Childhood Advisory Council, makes children's issues a top priority in law, emphasizing economic return on investment in early childhood.

== Writing and public speaking ==
Faircloth's first book is titled Attack of the Theocrats! How the Religious Right Harms Us All - and What We Can Do About It. Faircloth said about the book, "we can believe rationally all we want. But we have to face up to reality: in the last thirty years we have seen the rise of theocracy in this country like we've never seen before. They've been tremendously successful on the religious right." The book focuses on the importance of returning America to its secular roots. Faircloth's goal is to motivate secularists to become as active as the religious right saying, "let's do that. Let's get that done, and change society for the better" by focusing on the harmful changes brought about by the religious right. Faircloth is hoping the book will be a "wakeup call to many liberal religionists" and create an alliance between skeptics, non-theists and many religious liberals who should all care about the harm done by religious bias in the law. The book "doesn't just offer a call [to action], but a plan to address it." In this review of the book, Adam Savage from MythBusters, writes: "There's not a doubt in my mind that if he was (suddenly, inexplicably) zapped back in time to meet Thomas Jefferson, that the Founding Father would clap him on the shoulder and say Thanks." Susan Jacoby, Bill Nye and JREF's James Randi also give glowing reviews. Richard Dawkins writes that this book is important "particularly as we approach America's 2012 elections. The trend toward theocratic thinking in the United States is a danger not only for America but for the entire world."

In 2016, Faircloth published The Enchanted Globe which is a fantasy adventure story that teaches geography. The Maine Edge reviews the book and states that The Enchanted Globe is a "solid effort, telling an engaging story that will capture the imagination." BDN Maine calls it a "fast-paced adventure story... the story starts in Maine, features highly recognizable Maine people, places and things, and carries with it an overall spirit of the state and its inhabitants."

Faircloth was a regular opinion columnist for the Bangor Metro Magazine from 2004 to 2009, and a columnist for the Bangor Daily News in the late 1990s. Because of his ideas about childhood obesity policy, Faircloth has spoken around the United States, including venues at Yale, Harvard, Rice University, and the Centers for Disease Control.

As Majority Whip, Faircloth was selected to welcome Presidential candidate Senator Barack Obama in this warm-up speech when the Senator visited Maine in 2008. Faircloth states "We want a candidate who goes beyond parties...thinks independently and seeks justice."

In April 2014, Faircloth spoke at the Tree of Evolution's 'Science, Freethinking and Secularism' event in Istanbul in Turkey. His lecture centered on Turkish secularism, Atatürk and the Erdogan government. At the time YouTube was banned in Turkey which made it difficult for the speech to be shared beyond the audience. It was finally uploaded to DailyMotion in June and according to Good Morning Turkey it was "shared through social media thousands of times, named 'Turkey from an American's point of view'."

Faircloth has spoken around the United States regarding the U.S. Constitution, children's policy, obesity policy, and sex crime law. In 2013 Faircloth traveled to New Zealand and Australia, lecturing at the Sydney Opera House to start policy oriented secular groups, whose model can be duplicated in other countries.

== Justice system reform ==
Faircloth graduated from the University of Notre Dame and the University of California, Hastings College of the Law. Attorney Faircloth worked in private law practice, served as an Assistant Attorney General, as Legal Counsel to the Maine State Senate, and lobbied on behalf of the Maine State Bar Association. He also taught courses within the University of Maine system, including Criminal Law, Criminal Evidence, Judicial Process, Administrative Law, Legal Controversies, Advocacy, as well as Legal Writing and Research.

Based on his experience as a lawyer and Assistant Attorney General, Faircloth worked successfully for improvements in child support and child protective laws. Faircloth served on the Judiciary Committee six years and also initiated improvements in the Unfair Trade Practices Act and adoption law. The Judiciary Committee had jurisdiction over both abortion and human rights law. Faircloth voted strongly pro-choice, and favored equal rights for gay citizens. In ten years as a legislator, Faircloth voted 100% of the time with the Maine Women's Lobby. Faircloth served as House Chair of a Commission on the Citizen's Initiative Process in 2006, and also in 2004 chaired a Commission focused on addressing child sexual abuse.

Faircloth received awards of recognition, including the 2006 Legislator of the Year Award from the Maine People's Alliance, the 2005 Excellence in Advocacy Award from the American Heart Association's Northeast Affiliate, and Legislator of the Year awards from the Maine Chapters of the American Academy of Pediatrics, The American Psychological Association, the National Association of Social Workers, and the Software Developers Association.

== Separation of church and state activism ==
He was Executive Director of the Secular Coalition for America from 2009 to 2011, advocating for separation of church and state, and for greater acceptance of nontheistic viewpoints in American life. His duties included advocating on Capitol Hill and to the administration for a strong separation of church and state. He also worked with the Secular Coalition for America board to create a ten-year plan called Our Secular Decade. Faircloth has been active in the protection of the separation of church and State. While a sitting legislator, gave an opening "prayer" for the session that quoted, not scripture, but the book Freethinkers by Susan Jacoby, as well as Walt Whitman.

Faircloth also advocates and speaks around the United States regarding secular public policy and the harm that he believes can come to average citizens if the secular nature of the American Constitution is not followed.

In September 2011 he was appointed as Director of Strategy and Policy at the Richard Dawkins Foundation for Reason and Science. He was the opening speaker for Dawkins's 2011 and 2012 book tours. Dawkins speaks highly of Faircloth and says he "has a proven ability to strategize, organize, and energize -- qualities essential to making secularism a successful social movement... I want him out speaking far and wide." Faircloth's responsibilities included blogging on the RDF website as well as public speaking for secularism and "the dangers of theocratic laws, and the value of scientific policy".

Faircloth has represented the Richard Dawkins Foundation on many radio shows including Catholic Answers Live and Wisconsin Public Radio.

== Personal life ==
Faircloth is the father of three sons, the youngest, Declan was the unofficial editor for The Enchanted Globe.
