= Bangor Film Festival =

- Location: Bangor, Maine

The Bangor Film Festival started as a week-long event, taking place annually in the city of Bangor, Maine. The festival, typically held in the second week of August at venues in the greater Bangor area including the Bangor Opera House. The goal of the festival is to promote independent filmmakers from all over the world, with a special emphasis on showcasing films from the local Maine film scene. Each year the festival features special discussion panels and screenings which focus on a particular cinematic theme or genre. Each year the festival gives awards in the following categories; Best of the Festival (Audience Award), The John Ford Award (for outstanding achievement in directing) and the Queen City Award (special jury prize).

The first annual BFF took place in late December 2007. The festival was founded by Shadow Puppets Entertainment, a local film production company. The special focus of the 2007 festival was on the independent short film. The festival also hosts the first annual 28-Eighty Film Shootout Competition, in which filmmakers have 2,880 minutes (48 hours) in which to write, direct and edit their films.

In 2010, the Bangor Film Festival merged with the KahBang Film Festival, becoming part of the KahBang Music, Art & Film Festival. Now in its fifth year, the KahBang Film Festival is a three-day festival, taking place on the Bangor Waterfront during New England's indie & largest discovery festival; showcasing emerging talents in music | art | film. To that end, KahBang Film is a discovery festival for independent cinema, dedicated to showcasing emerging films and filmmakers and exposing them to new audiences. The festival is a program of the non-profit organization KahBang Arts. To serve this mission, the KahBang Film Festival uses a free ticket model allowing for a wide, diverse audience of festival-goers.

KahBang film receives submissions for independent filmmakers from across the globe.
