= KahBang Music and Art Festival =

- Genre: rock, hip hop, pop, metal, electronic, indie
- Dates: Second weekend in August
- Location(s): Bangor, Maine & Portland, Maine
- Years active: 2009–present
- Founders: Timothy Lo and Chas Bruns
- Website: kahbang.com

The KahBang Music and Art Festival (commonly referred to as KahBang) was an annual four-day music, art, and film festival held in Bangor and Portland, Maine. The event features many genres of music, as well as independent film screenings and art installations. Other activities offered at the festival have included boat cruises, a brew fest, "KahBlock Party," and the closing "KahBrunch and Kickball Tournament." At times the festival has offered lodging and camping packages, and the campsite often features additional musical entertainment throughout the event. In 2014, the music portion of the event was cancelled, and the art/film portion was moved to Portland, Maine.

== History ==
=== 2009 ===
The inaugural KahBang Festival, held in August 2009, brought more than 2,000 attendees to the Bangor, Maine Waterfront and featured bands such as Matt and Kim, Ra Ra Riot and Ida Maria. The festival was originally a two-day music event.

=== 2010 ===
In 2010 the festival expanded to include the Bangor Film Festival. Like its counterparts, the film festival focused on showcasing emerging filmmakers and independently produced works. The inaugural lineup of films included the Maynard James Keenan documentary Blood Into Wine and the indie feature comedy New Low.

The expanded festival attracted over 30,000 attendees and featured live performances from BOB, OK Go, Biz Markie, Free Energy, and Bad Rabbits.

=== 2011 ===
In 2011, the festival offered camping for the first time. The festival campsite was located on the remains of an old driving range and was a short distance from the festival grounds. New additions to KahBang 2011 included the establishment of KahBang Arts, a nonprofit arm of festival operations, headed by a board of directors composed of community members. 2011 was also the first KahBang Connect Conference, a social media industry conference, showcasing experts from across the spectrum of social media and connectivity.

Acts included: My Morning Jacket, Lupe Fiasco, Grace Potter and the Nocturnals, Atmosphere, Chromeo, and Surfer Blood

=== 2012 ===
In 2012, the festival hosted a summer art walk in conjunction with the festival, and local artists opened the doors to their studios and galleries for public viewing in conjunction with the festival.

In 2012, KahBang adapted to its current format of 4 days, running Thursday through Sunday and added its Brew Fest event, highlighting local, micro-brewed beer.

Acts included: Bassnectar, Deftones, Paper Diamond, Penguin Prison, Reptar, Lady Lamb the Beekeeper, Astronautalis, Now, Now, and Spose

=== 2013 ===
The first day of the 2013 festival was hampered by nonstop rain that at times heavily deterred the majority of festival-goers. Muddy fields made for difficult dancing, and the constant wet made it dangerous for amplifiers to be plugged in. Several bands had to postpone their performances until Saturday, while others played acoustic or performed in the Dance Tent. The Bangor Daily News hosted a "What’s Next Conference" as part of the festival, and brought multiple panelists and speakers from all over the country to lead technology and business discussions on topics such as social media, app development, marketing and branding. The festival also featured late night performances at bars around Bangor, and an early-morning dance party at the KahBang Campsite.

Acts included: Earl Sweatshirt, Dr. Dog, 12th Planet, The Weeks, Oberhofer, RDGLDGRN, Vacationer, Spose, Lady Lamb the Beekeeper, Codes, Spencer Albee, and Mean Creek

=== 2014 ===
Three weeks before major performers DMX and St. Vincent were scheduled to take the stage, organizers announced a last-minute venue change that took the festival two hours south to Portland, Maine. The 2014 edition of the music, art and film festival was to be held mostly indoors at venues including the State Theatre and Port City Music Hall. The KahBang Festival had partnered with the city of Portland to bring concerts to the Maine State Pier in the summer of 2011. The decision was greatly influenced by the festival’s failure to find a campsite to house festival-goers, artists and bands in the Bangor area.

On July 31, 2014, KahBang director Joshua Gass announced that the music portion of the festival had been cancelled and told fans that "several setbacks in planning, including the loss of sponsors, made it difficult to stage the acts." The KahBang Brew Fest had already been cancelled two weeks previous to the announcement.
