= Penobscot River Bridge =

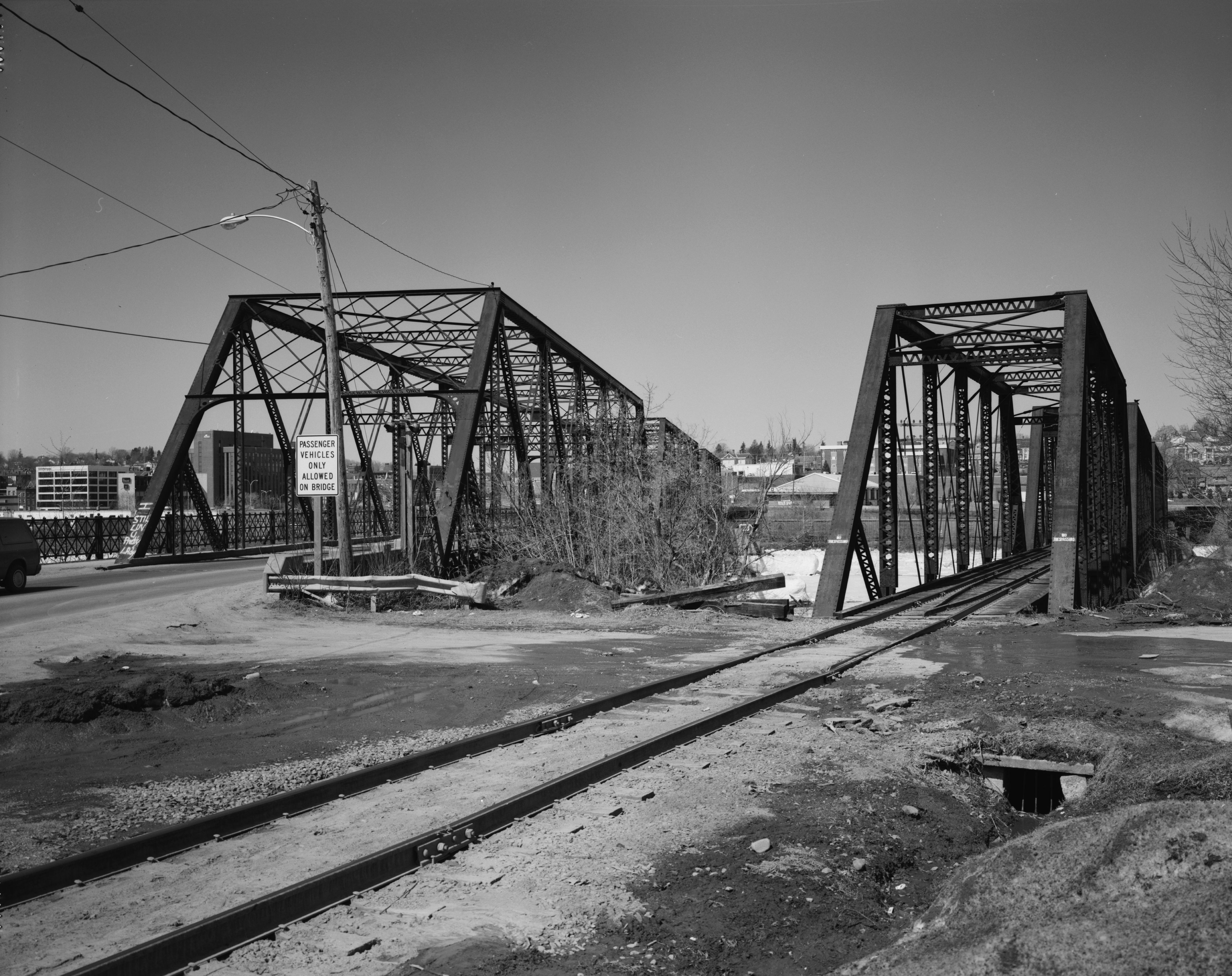
- Penobscot Bridge on left, railroad bridge on right
- Coordinates: 44°47′56″N 68°45′51″W
- Carries: Motor vehicles, cyclists, and pedestrians
- Crosses: Penobscot River
- Locale: Bangor/Brewer, Maine

Characteristics
- Design: truss
- Total length: 657 feet (200 m)
- Width: 32 feet (10 m)
- Longest span: 218 feet (66 m)
- Load limit: 15 tons - 3 tons

History
- Construction start: 1902
- Construction end: 1911
- Opened: 1902
- Closed: 1997

The Penobscot River Bridge was a truss bridge between Bangor and Brewer, Maine. It was constructed by the American Bridge Company in 1902, with further construction in 1911 by the Boston Bridge Works. According to the Historic American Engineering Record, it was the last remaining Baltimore (Petit) through-truss bridge in Maine. While it was designed for loads of up to 15 tons, it was reduced to 3 tons shortly before its replacement in 1997 by the "New Penobscot Bridge."

The bridge carried U.S. Route 1A and Route 15 across the Penobscot River. While 1A still crosses the New Penobscot Bridge, SR-15 was redirected over I-395's Veterans Remembrance Bridge after its completion in 1986.

== See also ==
- List of bridges documented by the Historic American Engineering Record in Maine
- List of bridges in the United States

== Gallery ==
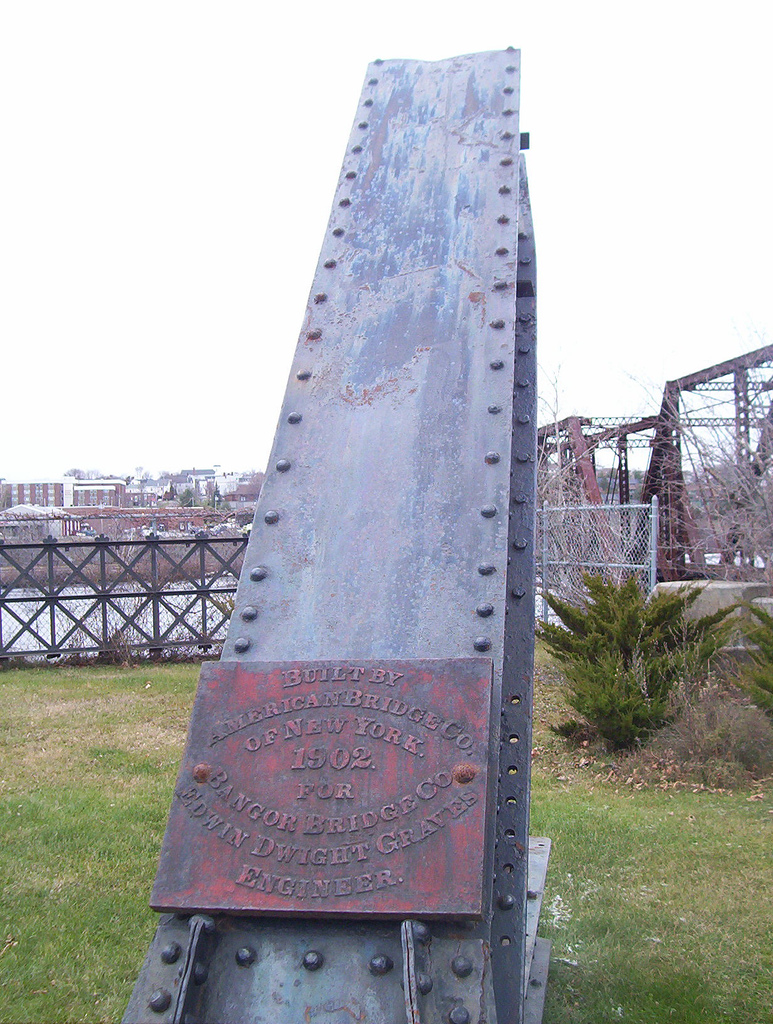
Last remaining piece of the bridge, installed near its original location

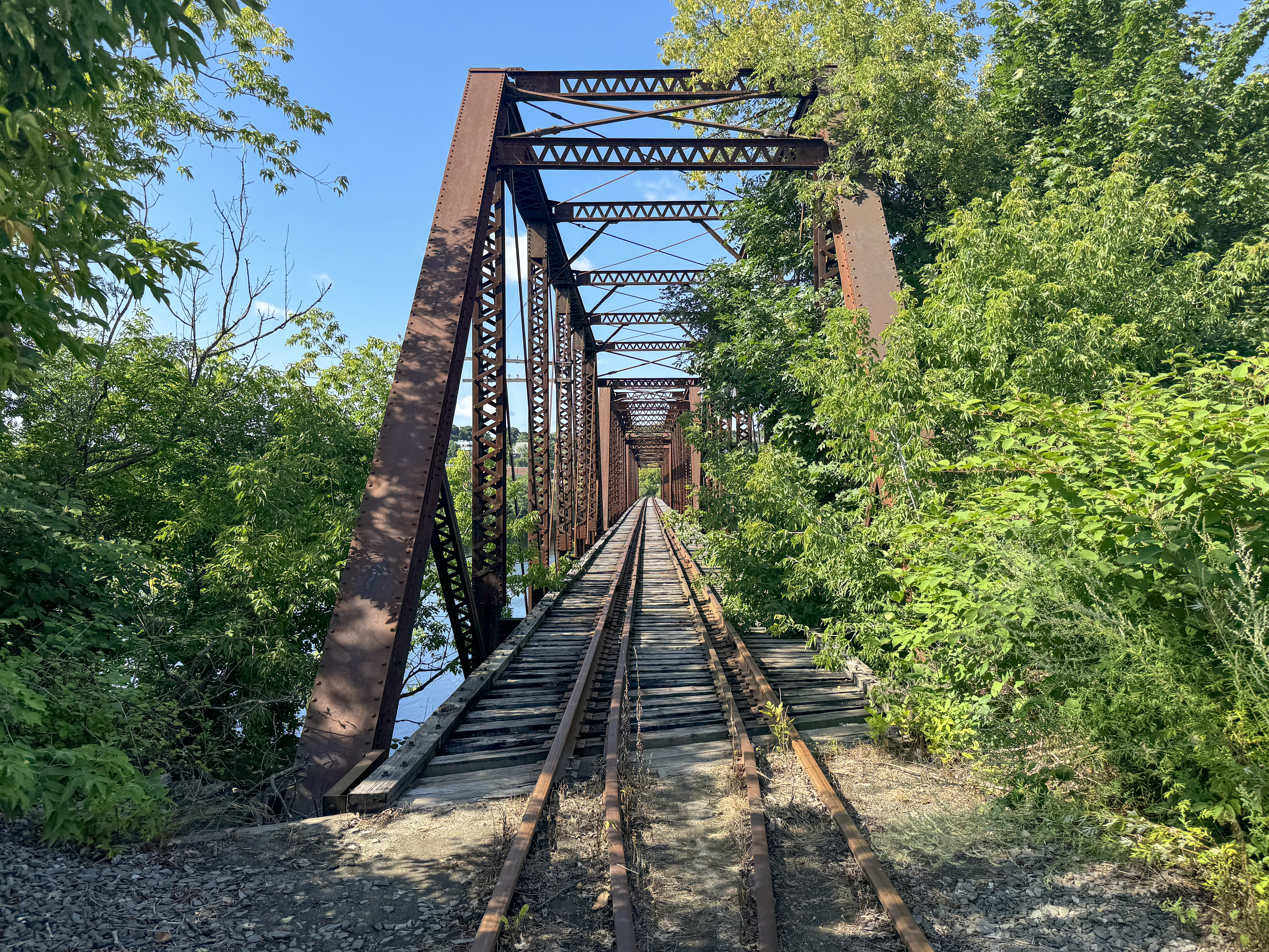
The adjacent Bangor-Brewer Railroad Bridge, still in use today
