= Maine Discovery Museum =

Children's museum in Maine, USA

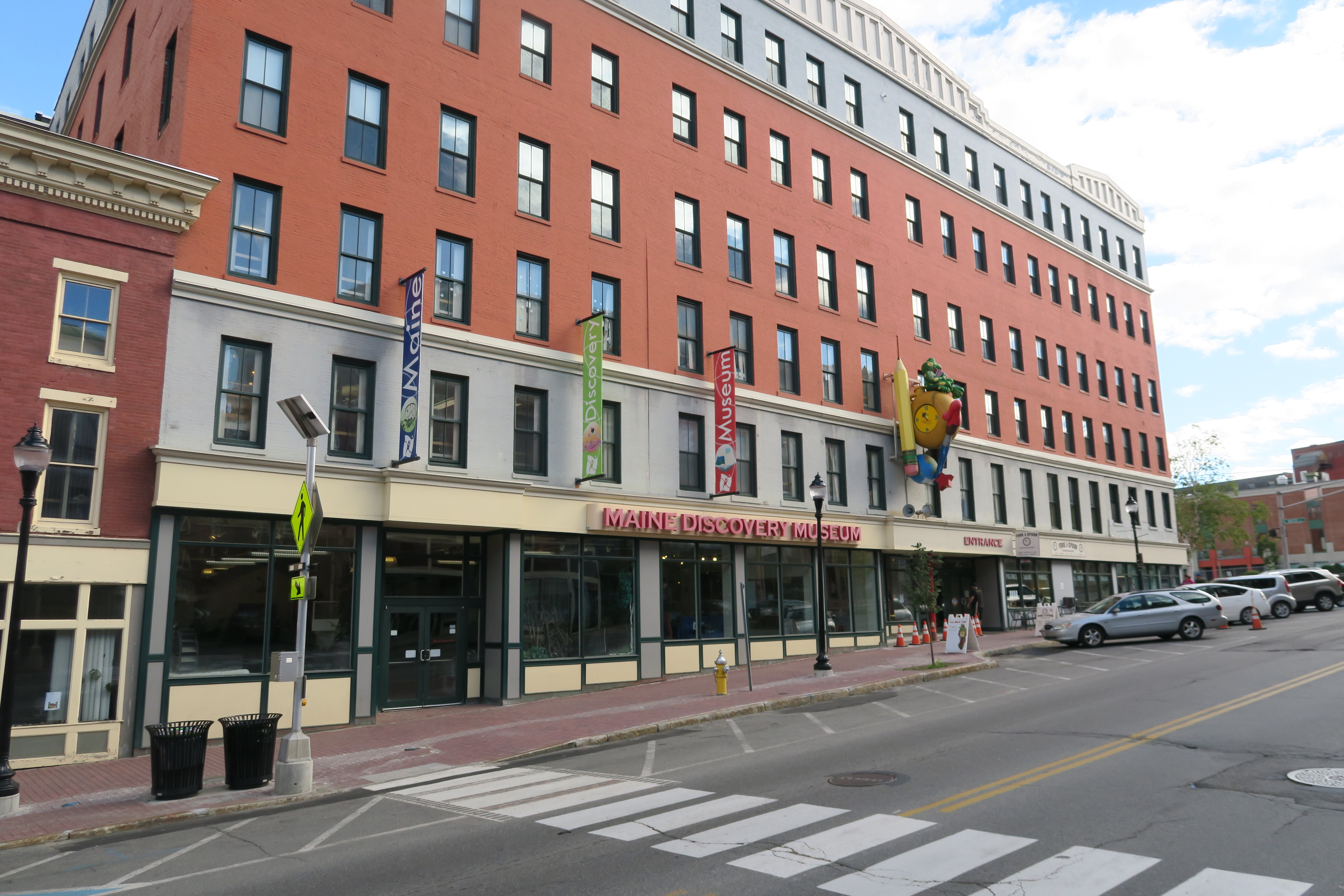

- Location within Maine
- Established: 2001
- Location: 74 Main Street; Bangor, Maine, United States
- Coordinates: 44.8000°N 68.7717°W
- Website: mainediscoverymuseum.org

The Maine Discovery Museum, located in Bangor, Maine, is Maine's largest children's museum and the largest located north of Boston, Massachusetts.

It opened in 2001 in the converted Freese's Building department store following several years of planning and fundraising. Maine Discovery Museum is a member of the Association of Children's Museums.

== History ==
In 1996, Sean Faircloth had the idea for the Maine Discovery Museum and led the project through completion of a $4.5 million facility in 2001. Then-Congressman John Baldacci said that Maine Discovery Museum “restored the heart” to downtown Bangor. At that time, the Maine Discovery Museum was the largest children's museum outside Boston in New England.

MDM boosts three floors of interactive exhibits, including its newest addition NANO, a permanent exhibit donated by the National Informal STEM Education (NISE) Network. NANO is an interactive exhibition of nanoscale science, engineering, and technology. Hands-on exhibits present the basics of nanoscience and engineering, introduce some real-world applications, and explore the societal and ethical implications of this new technology. MDM was selected by the NISE Network to receive this donated exhibit valued at $50,000 in recognition of their work to educate in the field of science.

Celebrating ten years in the community, the Maine Discovery Museum was named Nonprofit of the Year in 2012 by the Bangor Region Chamber of Commerce. Also in 2012, MDM was chosen as the Grand Marshal of the city's historic Independence Day Parade and celebration and also launched its Capital Campaign.

MDM is also a member of Bangor Arts, a group that strives to support the arts and cultural scene in the Bangor region.

In February 2026, Maine Discovery Museum was announced as one of only ten Institute of Museum and Library Services (IMLS) 2025 winners of the National Medal for Museum and Library Service. Also in 2026, the Maine Science Festival, a program of Maine Discovery Museum, was named the Nonprofit of the Year by the Bangor Region Chamber of Commerce.

== Let's Move! ==
Maine Discovery Museum is a "Let's Move!" institution, partnering with the First Lady Michelle Obama's initiative to fight childhood obesity. In early 2012, the museum opted to remove all traditional vending and dining options in the museum and replace them with vending machines offering natural and organic snacks, juices and soda as well as gluten and dairy free foods and vegan options. The change was made to kick off a new healthy kids initiative. Many exhibits within the museum focus on both gross motor and fine motor movements.

== Fundraising ==
The largest and longest running fundraising effort of the museum is its Annual Auction held in the fall. Artists from across the state and beyond donate works to be auctioned at the auction banquet.

== First Floor ==
- Reptile Room: includes reptiles such as Ball Python, Bearded Dragon, Crested Geckos, Leopard Geckos and more
- Nature Trails: includes in-door river and nature trails, life size explorable beaver dam, and a two story tree house
- Gift Shop
- Front Desk

== Second Floor ==
- Booktown: includes the Good Night Moon room for reading children’s stories, vintage motorcycle and Vespa, puppet show, and play farm
- Tradewinds: includes play kitchen, instruments, world floor map, play cargo ship with cargo and crane
- two Party Rooms
- Snack Room

== Third Floor ==
- Sun, Earth, Universe: includes build your own rocket-ship, learn and read about space, uncode secret messages using UV, Magnets and more
- Artscape: includes design a Light-Bright display, build structures from PBC pipe, and paper making
- Pet Vet: includes stuffed animals Pedro, Digger, and Tab.E.Cat, a play vets office with doctors desk, exam table, and veterinary equipment this is also part of the “Doctors Office” exhibit, and home for stuffed animals after their care
- Dino Dig: includes dig and identify fossils, read and learn about dinosaurs, find/hatch dinosaur eggs, and discover what dinosaurs ate
- Doctors Office: includes a play doctors office where one can be a patient or doctor this is also part of the “Pet Vet” exhibit, explorable human body parts that you can walk through, and bug set of teeth with toothbrush to clean them
