= Bishop Cotton School =

Bishop Cotton School may refer to:

- Bishop Cotton Boys' School, Bangalore
- Bishop Cotton Girls' School, Bangalore
- Bishop Cotton School (Shimla), Shimla, Himachal Pradesh, India

== See also ==
- BCS (disambiguation)
