= Bangor Christian Schools =

Private school in Maine, United States

Coordinates: 44.8460°N 68.8010°W

Bangor Christian Schools (BCS) is a K-12 Christian school in Bangor, Maine.

== History ==
The school began operations in 1970. In 2004, it had 117 high school students and 235 elementary and middle school students.

Prospective parents were plaintiffs in Carson v. Makin.

The Office of the Attorney General of the State of Maine in 2021 stated that the school does not employ LGBTQ teachers and the school culture discourages students from expressing LGBTQ identities, with the possibility that the school may expel students for doing so.

== Operations ==
The annual tuition in 2004 was $2,900 per year per pupil, and at the time the state did not provide any funds, nor did the federal government.

== Curriculum ==
Its elementary school curriculum promotes phonics at early stages.

== Athletics ==
It is a part of the Penobscot Valley Conference.
