= Berlin Cosmopolitan School =

School in Berlin, Germany

Coordinates: 52.527698°N 13.406604°E

Information
- Established: 2004; 22 years ago
- Language: English; German
- Website: www.cosmopolitanschool.de/en/

Berlin Cosmopolitan School (BCS) is a non-profit international school located in Berlin, Germany. The school offers preschool, kindergarten, primary and secondary schooling. BCS is an authorised International Baccalaureate World School and follows the Primary Years Programme (PYP) and the Diploma Programme (DP). The primary language of instruction is English with some classes taught in German. In order to graduate students can choose to take part in the IB Diploma Programme, the bilingual Abitur or both.

== History ==
The school opened as a pre-school in 2004, as a primary school in 2007, and as a secondary school in 2009. It became an authorised International Baccalaureate World School on 18 February 2013.

=== Commitment to nature and environmental protection ===
Since 2017, Berlin Cosmopolitan School has had its own school forest in Prenden. Every week, sixth-grade classes spend a whole school day in the forest. Other students also regularly explore and learn in the forest. Through methods and lessons in nature, The school aims to prepare its students to treat the environment and the world in general with respect, awareness, and compassion.
