= BCS: 50 Years =

Book by Leon Cooper

- Hardcover edition
- Author: Leon N Cooper & Dmitri Feldman (Eds.)
- Language: English
- Subject: Physics and Condensed matter physics
- Genre: Non-fiction; review volume
- Publisher: World Scientific Publishing
- Publication date: 2010
- Publication place: Singapore
- Pages: 588
- ISBN: 978-981-4304-64-1

BCS: 50 Years is a review volume on the topic of superconductivity edited by Leon Cooper, a 1972 Nobel Laureate in Physics, and Dmitri Feldman of Brown University, first published in 2010.

The book consists of 23 articles written by outstanding physicists, including many Nobel prize-winners, and presents the complete theory of superconductivity - a phenomenon where the electrical resistance of some metallic materials suddenly vanish at temperatures near absolute zero.

== Background ==
In 1957, John Bardeen, Leon Cooper and John Robert Schrieffer finally pieced together the puzzle of superconductivity, explaining in detail its mechanism and the associated effects. The BCS theory, named after the three scientists, won Professor Cooper the Nobel Prize in Physics in 1972, which he shared with John Robert Schrieffer and his teacher, John Bardeen.

== Contents ==
=== Section 1: Historical Perspectives ===
The first section of the book describes important discoveries which led to the development of BCS theory.

- Chapter 1: "Remembrance of Superconductivity Past" by Leon N Cooper
- Chapter 2: "The Road to BCS" by John Robert Schrieffer
- Chapter 3: "Development of Concepts in Superconductivity" by John Bardeen
- Chapter 4: "Failed Theories of Superconductivity" by Jörg Schmalian
- Chapter 5: "Nuclear Magnetic Resonance and the BCS Theory" by Charles Pence Slichter
- Chapter 6: "Superconductivity: From Electron Interaction to Nuclear Superfluidity" by David Pines
- Chapter 7: "Developing BCS Ideas in the Former Soviet Union" by Lev P. Gor'kov
- Chapter 8: "BCS: The Scientific "Love of my Life"" by Philip Warren Anderson

=== Section 2: Fluctuations, Tunneling and Disorder ===
The second section focuses on quantum phenomena which occur in superconductors.

- Chapter 9: "SQUIDs: Then and Now" by John Clarke
- Chapter 10: "Resistance in Superconductors" by Bertrand I. Halperin, Gil Refael and Eugene Demler
- Chapter 11: "Cooper Pair Breaking" by Peter Fulde
- Chapter 12: "Superconductor-Insulator Transitions" by Allen M. Goldman
- Chapter 13: "Novel Phases of Vortices in Superconductors" by Pierre Le Doussal
- Chapter 14: "Breaking Translational Invariance by Population Imbalance: The Fulde-Ferrell-Larkin-Ovchinnikov States" by Gertrud Zwicknagl and Jochen Wosnitza

=== Section 3: New Superconductors ===
Section three of the book is on various experimental and theoretical methods used to identify new superconducting materials.

- Chapter 15: "Predicting and Explaining $T_c$ and Other Properties of BCS Superconductor" by Marvin L. Cohen
- Chapter 16: "The Evolution of HTS: $T_c$-Experiment Perspectives" by Paul Chu
- Chapter 17: "The Evolution of High-Temperature Superconductivity: Theory Perspective" by Elihu Abrahams

=== Section 4: BCS Beyond Superconductivity ===
The final section of the book is on the application of BCS theory beyond the field of superconductivity.

- Chapter 18: "The Superfluid Phases of Liquid ^{3}He: BCS Theory" by Anthony James Leggett
- Chapter 19: "Superfluidity in a Gas of Strongly Interacting Fermions" by Wolfgang Ketterle, Y. Shin, André Schirotzek and C. H. Schunk
- Chapter 20: "BCS from Nuclei and Neutron Stars to Quark Matter and Cold Atoms" by Gordon Baym
- Chapter 21: "Energy Gap, Mass Gap, and Spontaneous Symmetry Breaking" by Yoichiro Nambu
- Chapter 22: "BCS as Foundation and Inspiration: The Transmutation of Symmetry" by Frank Wilczek
- Chapter 23: "From BCS to the LHC" by Steven Weinberg

== Reception ==
John Swain writing for CERN Courier describes the book as a wonderful review of a powerful unifying concept which covers an enormous range of phenomena. Malcolm Beasley for Physics Today adds that the book will provide any person curious about superconductivity with something to enjoy. In addition, Jermey Matthews, the book editor from Physics Today, had chosen BCS: 50 years as one of the five books to put on your 2011 holiday wish list.

== Additional information ==
13 papers from the book have been published concurrently as a special issue of the International Journal of Modern Physics B.

== See also ==
- Solid-state physics
- Charles Kittel
- David Mermin
