= Bangor, Maine =

City in Maine, United States

Bangor
- City
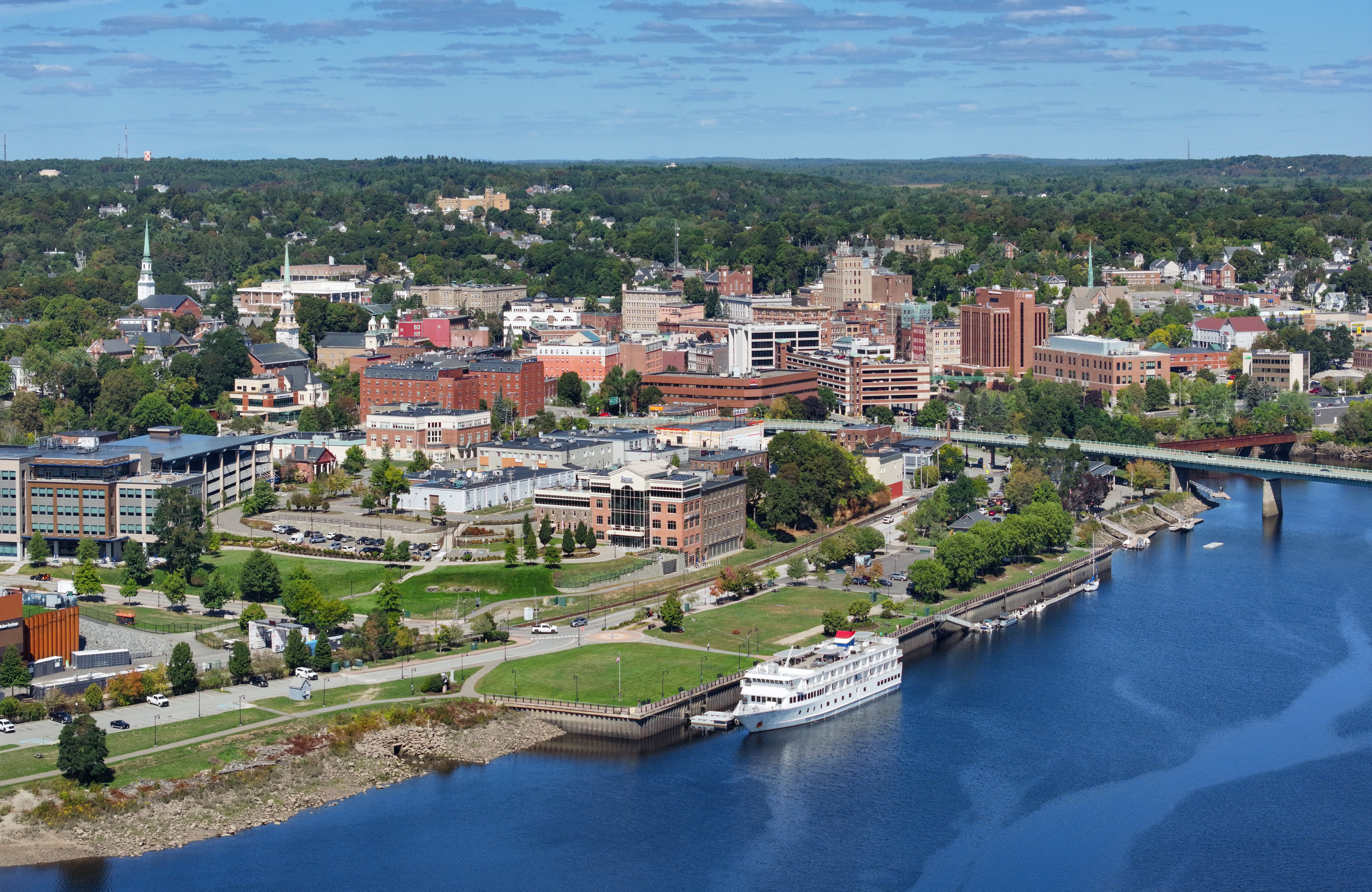
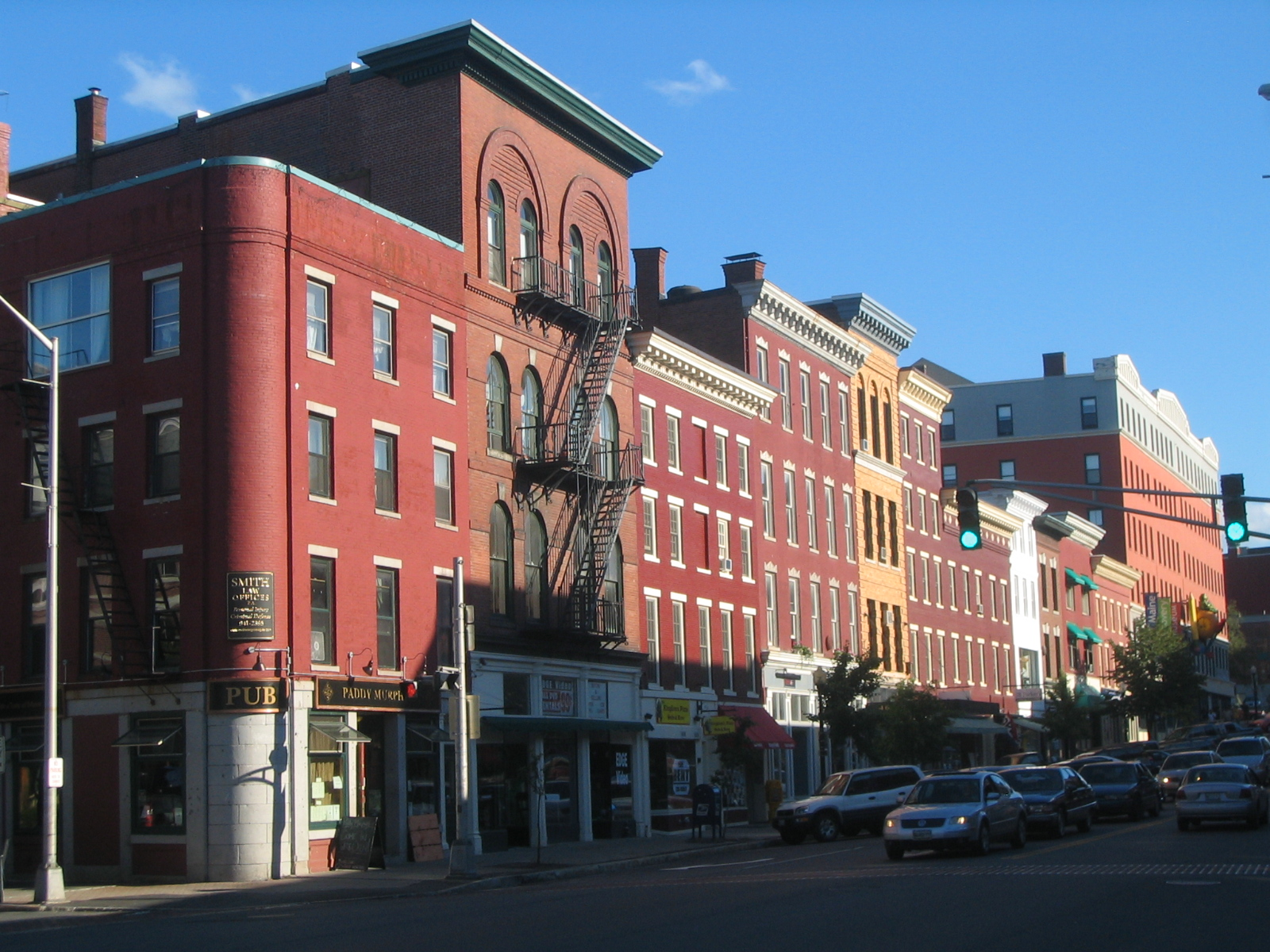
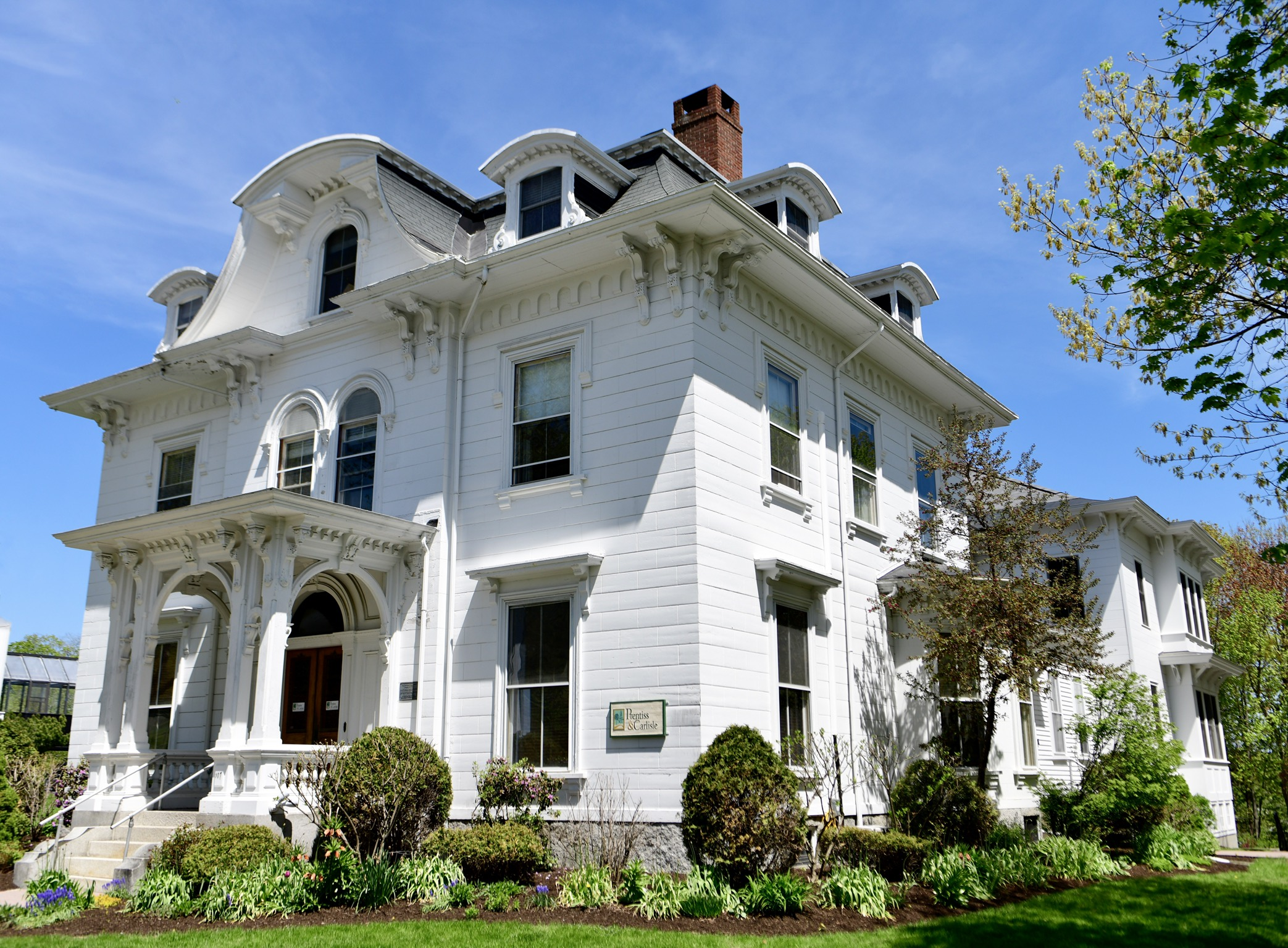
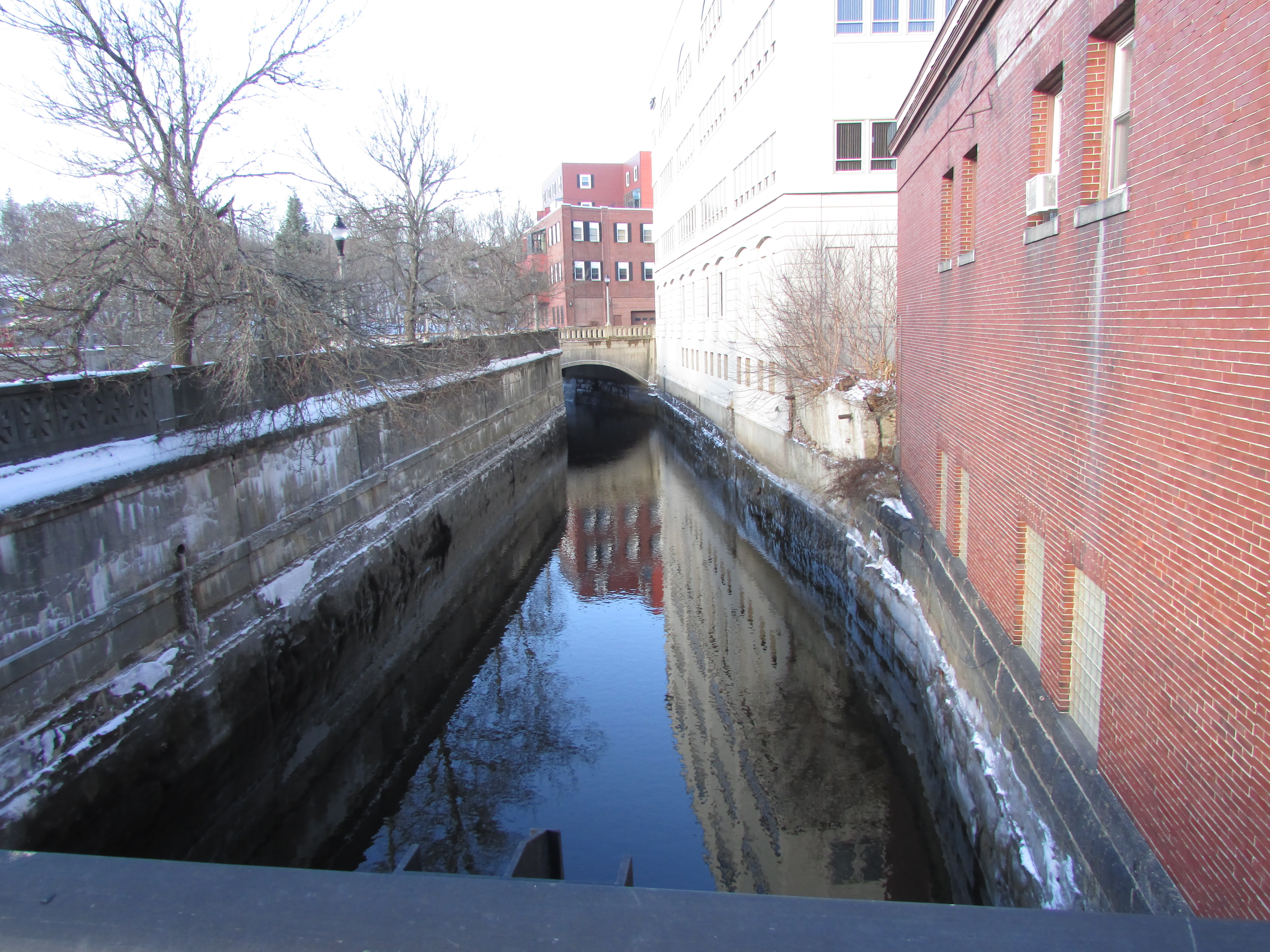
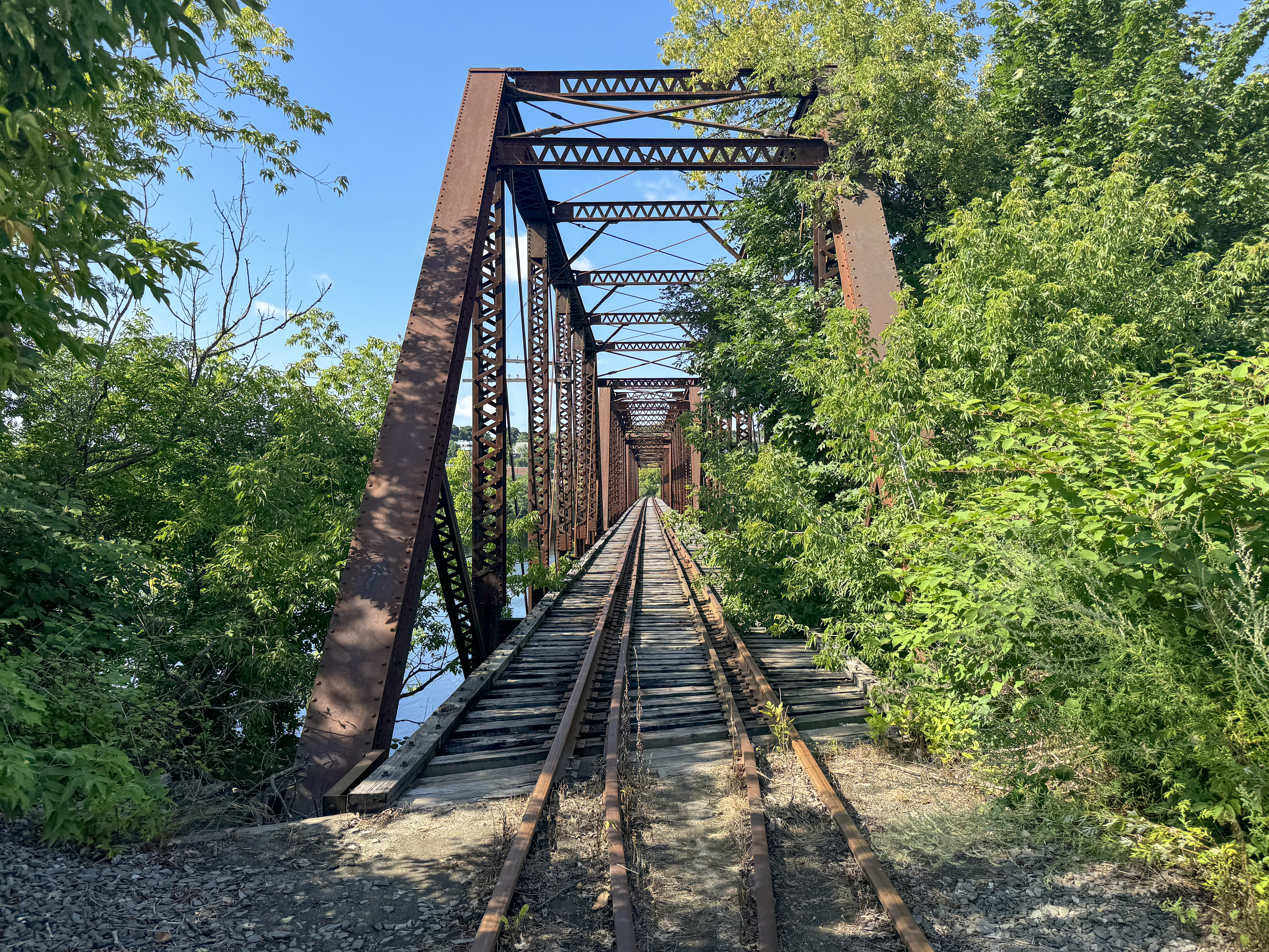
- Skyline Lower Main Street Blake House Kenduskeag Stream Bangor–Brewer Railroad Bridge

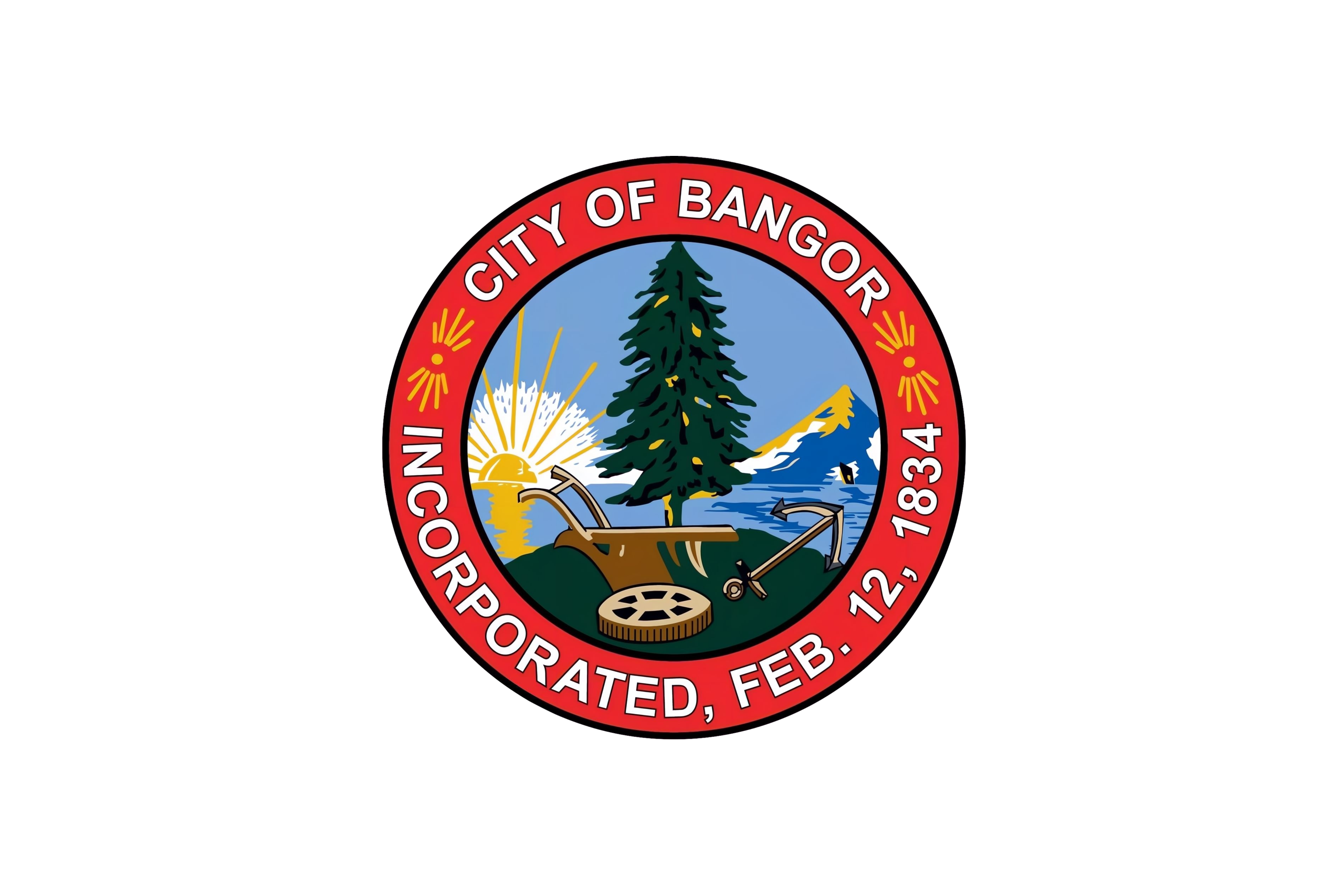
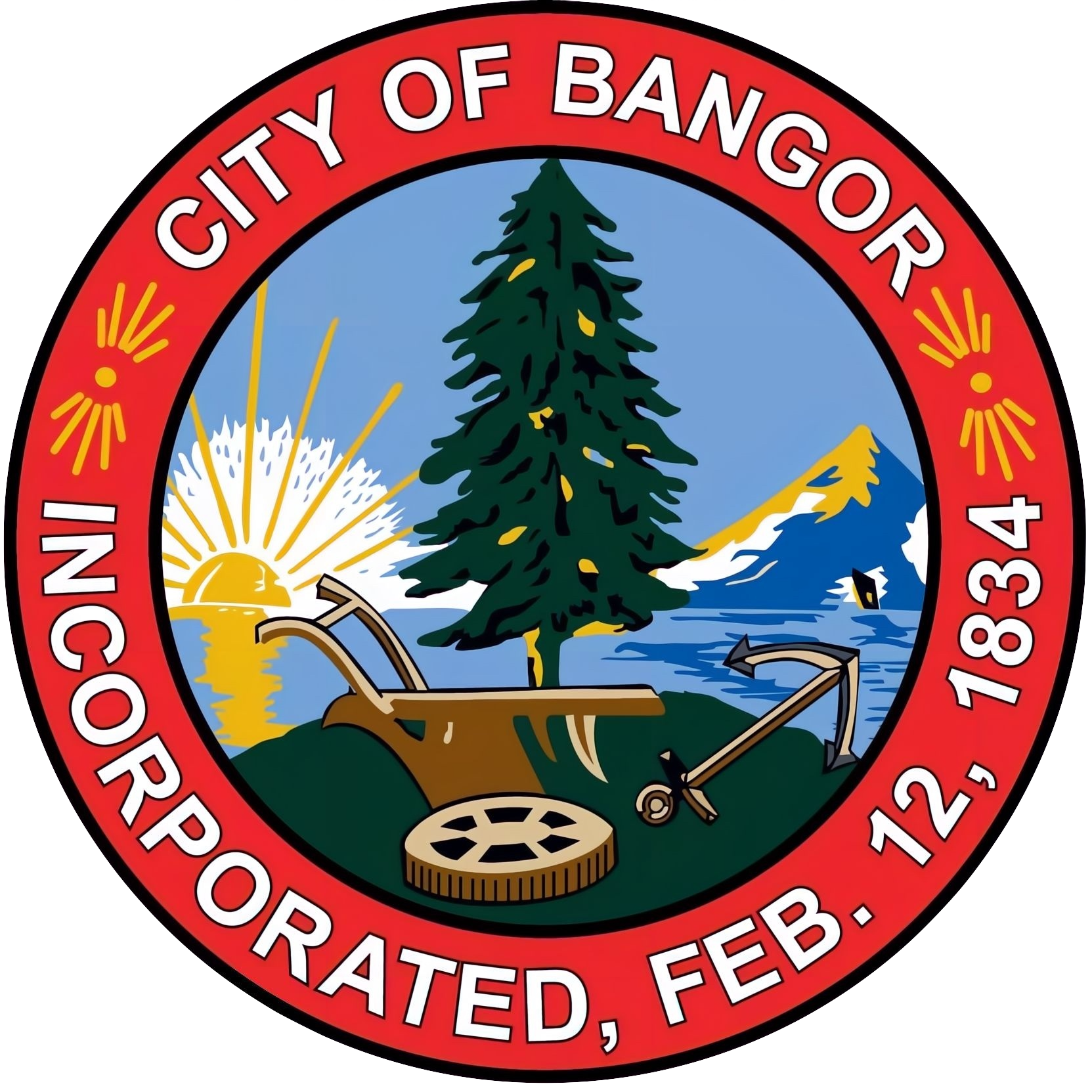
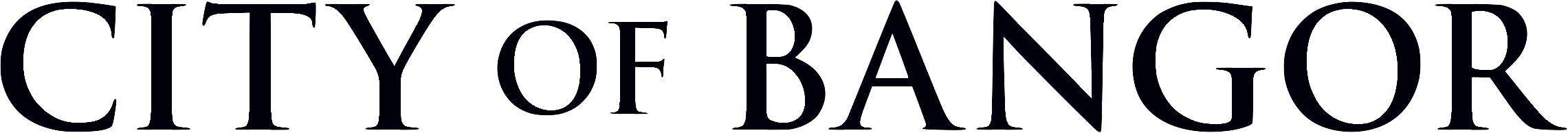
- Flag Seal Logo
- Nickname: The Queen City of the East
- Interactive map of Bangor
- Location within Maine Location within the United States
- Coordinates: 44°51′30″N 68°45′42″W
- Country: United States
- State: Maine
- County: Penobscot
- Settled: 1769
- Incorporated (plantation): 1791
- Incorporated (town): February 12, 1834
- Incorporated (city): March 26, 1853
- Named for: Bangor, a Welsh hymn written by William Tans'ur

Government
  - Type: Council–manager

Area
  - City: 34.59 sq mi (89.60 km^{2})
  - Land: 34.26 sq mi (88.73 km^{2})
  - Water: 0.34 sq mi (0.87 km^{2})
- Elevation: 164 ft (50 m)

Population (2020)
  - City: 31,753
  - Density: 926.9/sq mi (357.86/km^{2})
  - Urban: 61,210 (US: 441st)
  - Metro: 153,923 (US: 276th)
- Demonym: Bangorean
- Time zone: UTC−05:00 (EST)
  - Summer (DST): UTC−04:00 (EDT)
- ZIP Codes: 04401–04402
- Area code: 207
- FIPS code: 23-02795
- GNIS feature ID: 582340
- Website: BangorMaine.gov

Bangor (/ˈbæŋɡɔːr/ BANG-gor) is the county seat and largest city of Penobscot County, Maine, United States. The city proper has a population of 31,753, making it the state's third-most populous city, behind Portland (68,408) and Lewiston (37,121). Bangor is known as the "Queen City".

Modern Bangor was established in the mid-19th century with the lumber and shipbuilding industries. Due to the city's location on the Penobscot River, logs could be floated downstream from the Maine North Woods and processed at the city's water-powered sawmills, then shipped from Bangor's port to the Atlantic Ocean 30 miles (48 km) downstream, and from there to any port in the world. Evidence of this is still visible in the lumber barons' elaborate Greek Revival and Victorian mansions and the 31-foot-high (9.4 m) statue of Paul Bunyan. Today, Bangor's economy is based on services and retail, healthcare, and education.

Bangor has a port of entry at Bangor International Airport, also home to the Bangor Air National Guard Base. Historically Bangor was an important stopover on the Great Circle Air Route between the U.S. East Coast and Europe.

== Name and pronunciation ==
Founded as Kenduskeag Plantation in 1791, Bangor was incorporated as a town in 1834. The name Bangor is said to have been taken from a Welsh hymn tune. It is also the name of the city of Bangor, Gwynedd ("bangor" in Old Welsh means "wattled enclosure").

The final syllable is pronounced gor. In 2015, local celebrities and business owners recorded the YouTube video "How to Say Bangor", which was sung to the tune of "We Are the World".

== History ==
=== Indigenous heritage ===
The Penobscot people have inhabited the area around present-day Bangor for at least 11,000 years and continue to occupy tribal land on the nearby Penobscot Indian Island Reservation. The Penobscot traditionally call the Bangor area kkάtaskkik, meaning "at/on the water parsnip ground," which European colonists rendered in English as Kenduskeag. The Penobscot practiced some agriculture but relied more heavily on hunting and gathering than indigenous peoples in warmer southern New England.

Contact with Europeans began in the 16th century through the lucrative fur trade, as the Penobscot traded pelts for European goods. The first documented European exploration of the area was conducted by Estêvão Gomes, a Portuguese navigator in Spanish service, in 1524. Samuel de Champlain followed in 1605. The Jesuits established a mission on Penobscot Bay in 1609 as part of the French colony of Acadia. The Penobscot River valley remained contested between France and Britain until the 1750s.

=== Early settlement ===
European settlement began in 1769 when Jacob Buswell established a community at the future site of Bangor. By 1772, twelve families lived in the settlement alongside a sawmill, store, and school. The population grew to 567 by 1787. Initially known as Sunbury or Kenduskeag Plantation, the community was incorporated as Bangor in 1791. The name "Bangor" is the Welsh word for wattled enclosure. It shares the name of Bangor, Gwynedd, the oldest city in Wales as well as Bangor, County Down in Northern Ireland. In the Irish language, Bangor is an anglicisation of Beannchar, meaning 'horned curve' referring to the shoreline of a bay.

=== Revolutionary War and War of 1812 ===
During the American Revolutionary War, Bangor played a role in the Penobscot Expedition of 1779. When the expedition failed, ten American naval vessels fled up the Penobscot River and were scuttled near Bangor to prevent capture by British forces. The ship remains lay undisturbed until construction of the Joshua Chamberlain Bridge in the late 1950s exposed the archaeological site. Six cannons were recovered from the riverbed; five remain on display in the region.

During the War of 1812, British forces under Robert Barrie briefly occupied Bangor in 1814 following the Battle of Hampden. Maine remained part of the Commonwealth of Massachusetts until 1820, when it was admitted to the Union as the 23rd state under the Missouri Compromise.

=== Lumber boom era ===
The mid-19th century marked Bangor's emergence as a major lumber center. The Penobscot River drainage basin proved ideal for the timber industry despite being unsuitable for agriculture. Winter snow allowed horse teams to drag logs from forests to the Penobscot River and its tributaries. Log driving during spring snowmelt transported timber to water-powered sawmills upriver from Bangor. The processed lumber was then shipped from Bangor's port to markets worldwide.

Bangor's strategic location at the head of navigation on the Penobscot River—where rapids met tidal waters—made it an ideal shipping point. Local capitalists owned much of the region's forestland, and Bangor-built ships carried lumber to East Coast cities, the Caribbean, and California during the California Gold Rush. The lumber trade established connections that led to the founding of communities named Bangor in Washington, California, and Nevada.

By 1860, Bangor had become the world's largest lumber port. The city operated 150 sawmills along the river and shipped over 150 million board feet of lumber annually. In 1860 alone, 3,300 lumber ships passed through Bangor's docks. The prosperity of the lumber trade enabled the construction of elaborate Greek Revival and Victorian mansions, many of which survive in the Broadway Historic District. This architectural heritage contributed to Bangor's nickname, "The Queen City of the East."

The Aroostook War of 1838–1839, a boundary dispute between the United States and Britain, highlighted the growing importance of Maine's lumber industry. Bangor emerged as both a lumbering boomtown and a potential rival to Portland's political dominance in the state.

=== Civil War era ===
The American Civil War significantly impacted Bangor. In 1861, a mob attacked the offices of the Bangor Daily Union, a Democratic newspaper whose editor Marcellus Emery held Southern sympathies. The attackers destroyed the presses and burned equipment in the street, forcing the paper to suspend publication until after the war.

Bangor contributed substantially to the Union war effort. The locally recruited 2nd Maine Volunteer Infantry Regiment was among the first units to leave Maine in 1861 and participated in the First Battle of Bull Run. The 1st Maine Heavy Artillery Regiment, also mustered in Bangor, suffered the highest casualties of any Union regiment during the war, particularly at the Second Battle of Petersburg in 1864. The 20th Maine Infantry Regiment achieved fame for its defense of Little Round Top during the Battle of Gettysburg under Joshua Chamberlain, for whom a local bridge is named. Bangor native Charles A. Boutelle accepted the surrender of Confederate naval forces after the Battle of Mobile Bay.

=== Industrial diversification ===
Beyond lumber, 19th-century Bangor developed diverse manufacturing capabilities. The city became a leading producer of moccasins, shipping over 100,000 pairs annually by the 1880s. Other exports included bricks, leather, and ice, which was harvested in winter and shipped to markets as distant as China, the West Indies, and South America.

Despite its success, Bangor faced geographic limitations. As a northern river port, it froze during winter months and could not accommodate the largest ocean-going vessels. The sparse settlement of its forested hinterland also limited the local market compared to competitors like Portland, Maine.

In 1844, the first ocean-going iron-hulled steamship in the United States was named The Bangor. Built by Harlan and Hollingsworth in Wilmington, Delaware, the vessel was designed for passenger service between Bangor and Boston. However, on its second voyage in 1845, the ship burned near Castine. Though rebuilt in Bath, it was soon sold to the U.S. government for service in the Mexican–American War.

Local industry innovation continued into the early 20th century. Bangor's Hinkley & Egery Ironworks (later Union Ironworks) developed a steam engine called the "Endeavor" that won a gold medal at the New York Crystal Palace Exhibition in 1856. Union Iron Works engineer Don A. Sargent invented the first automotive snow plow in the 1920s, which the company manufactured for national distribution.

=== Decline and transition ===
The late 19th and early 20th centuries saw Bangor's economy transition as the pulp and paper industry replaced traditional lumbering, and railroads superseded river transportation for moving goods. Local investors supported railroad development, including the Bangor and Aroostook Railroad, which opened northern Aroostook County to settlement and economic development.

Major fires periodically disrupted the city's development, with significant blazes in 1856, 1869, and 1872. The Great Fire of 1911 proved most devastating, destroying Bangor's high school, post office, public library, telephone and telegraph companies, banks, two fire stations, nearly 100 businesses, six churches, a synagogue, and 285 private residences across 55 acres. The subsequent rebuilding created an architectural showcase featuring diverse styles including Mansard, Beaux-Arts, Greek Revival, and Colonial Revival, now preserved as the Great Fire of 1911 Historic District.

== Geography ==
According to the United States Census Bureau, the city has a total area of 34.59 square miles (89.59 km^{2}), of which 34.26 square miles (88.73 km^{2}) is land and 0.33 square miles (0.85 km^{2}) is water.

A potential advantage that has always eluded exploitation is the city's location between the port city of Halifax, Nova Scotia, and the rest of Canada (as well as New York). As early as the 1870s, the city promoted a Halifax-to-New York railroad, via Bangor, as the quickest connection between North America and Europe (when combined with steamship service between Britain and Halifax). A European and North American Railway opened through Bangor, with President Ulysses S. Grant officiating at the inauguration, but commerce never lived up to the potential. More recent attempts to capture traffic between Halifax and Montreal by constructing an East–West Highway through Maine have also come to naught. Most overland traffic between the two parts of Canada continues to travel north of Maine rather than across it.

=== Urban development ===
==== Fires ====
Major fires struck the downtown in 1856, 1869, and 1872, the last resulting in the erection of the Adams-Pickering Block. In the Great Fire of 1911 Bangor lost its high school, post office & custom house, public library, telephone and telegraph companies, banks, two fire stations, nearly a hundred businesses, six churches, and synagogue and 285 private residences over a total of 55 acres (23 ha.) The area was rebuilt, and in the process became a showplace for a diverse range of architectural styles, including the Mansard style, Beaux Arts, Greek Revival and Colonial Revival, and is listed on the National Register of Historic Places as the Great Fire of 1911 Historic District.

==== Urban renewal ====
The destruction of downtown landmarks such as the old city hall and train station in the late 1960s urban renewal program is now considered to have been a mistake. It ushered in a decline of the city center that was accelerated by the construction of the Bangor Mall in 1978 and subsequent big-box stores on the city's outskirts. Downtown Bangor began to recover in the 1990s, with bookstores, café/restaurants, galleries, and museums filling once-vacant storefronts. The recent re-development of the city's waterfront has also helped re-focus cultural life in the historic center.

=== Hydrology ===
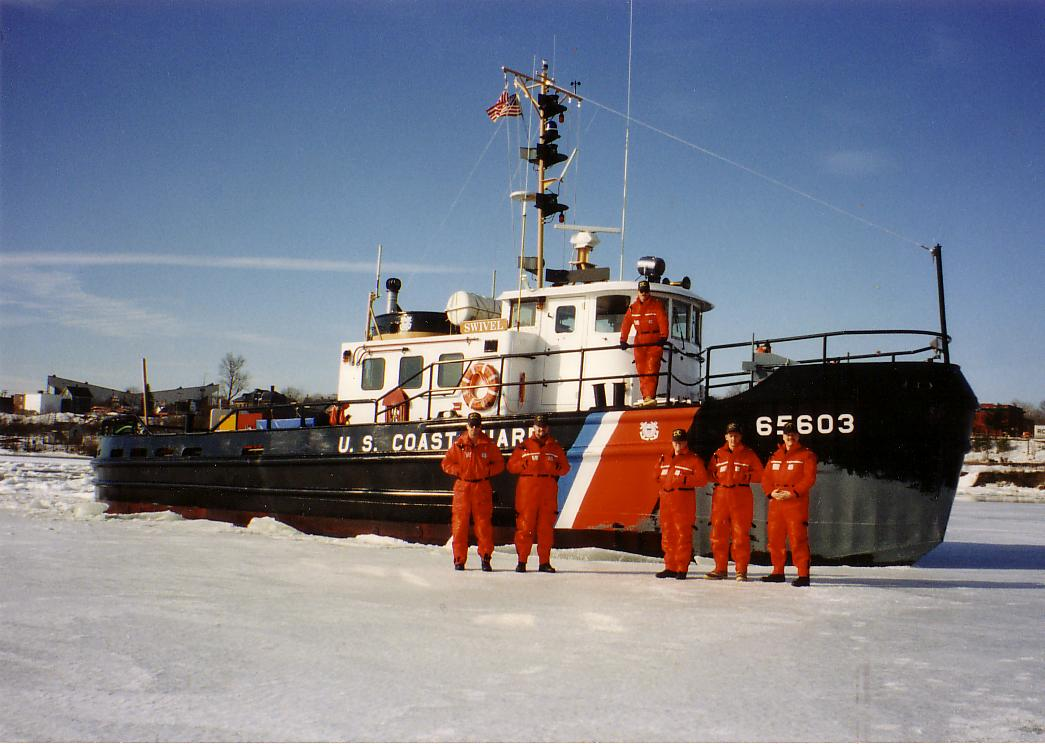
Ice breaking on the Penobscot River

Bangor is on the banks of the Penobscot River, close enough to the Atlantic Ocean to be influenced by tides. Upstream, the Penobscot River drainage basin occupies 8,570 square miles (22,200 km^{2}) in northeastern Maine. Flooding is most often caused by a combination of precipitation and snowmelt. Ice jams can exacerbate high flow conditions and cause acute localized flooding. Conditions favorable for flooding typically occur during the spring months.

In 1807 an ice jam formed below Bangor Village, raising the water 10 to 12 feet (3 to 3.7 m) above the normal highwater mark and in 1887 the freshet caused the Maine Central Railroad Company rails between Bangor and Vanceboro to be covered to a depth of several feet. Bangor's worst ice-jam floods occurred in 1846 and 1902. Both resulted from mid-December freshets that cleared the upper river of ice, followed by cold that produced large volumes of frazil ice or slush which was carried by high flows, forming a major ice jam in the lower river. In March of both years, a dynamic breakup of ice ran into the jam and flooded downtown Bangor. Though no people died and the city recovered quickly, the 1846 and 1902 ice-jam floods were economically devastating, according to the Army Corps analysis. Both floods occurred with multiple dams in place and little to no ice-breaking in the lower river. The United States Coast Guard began icebreaker operations on the Penobscot in the 1940s, preventing the formation of frozen ice jams during the winter and providing an unobstructed path for ice-out in the spring. Long-term temperature records show a gradual warming since 1894, which may have reduced the ice-jam flood potential at Bangor.

In the Groundhog Day gale of 1976, a storm surge went up the Penobscot, flooding Bangor for three hours. At 11:15 am, waters began rising on the river and within 15 minutes had risen a total of 12 feet (3.7 m), flooding downtown. About 200 cars were submerged and office workers were stranded until waters receded. There were no reported deaths during this unusual flash flood.

=== Climate ===
Bangor has a humid continental climate (Köppen: Dfb), with cold, snowy winters, and warm summers, and is in USDA hardiness zone 5a. The monthly daily average temperature ranges from 18.5 °F (−7.5 °C) in January to 69.5 °F (20.8 °C) in July. On average, there are 20 nights annually that drop to 0 °F (−18 °C) or below, and 55 days where the temperature stays below freezing, including 49 days from December through February. There is an average of 6.1 days annually with highs at or above 90 °F (32 °C), with the 2014 the last year not to have seen such high temperatures. Extreme temperatures range from −32 °F (−36 °C) on February 10, 1948, up to 104 °F (40 °C) on August 19, 1935.

The average first freeze of the season occurs on October 7, and the last May 7, resulting in a freeze-free season of 152 days; the corresponding dates for measurable snowfall, i.e. at least 0.1 in (0.25 cm), are November 23 and April 4. The average annual snowfall for Bangor is approximately 74.6 inches (189 cm), while snowfall has ranged from 22.2 inches (56 cm) in 1979–80 to 181.9 inches (4.62 m) in 1962−63; the record snowiest month was February 1969 with 58.0 inches (147 cm), while the most snow in one calendar day was 30.0 inches (76 cm) on December 14, 1927. A snow depth of at least 3 in (7.6 cm) is on average seen 66 days per winter, including 54 days from January to March, when the snow pack is typically most reliable.

Climate data for Bangor International Airport, Maine (1991–2020 normals, (Note: Mean monthly maxima and minima (i.e. the expected highest and lowest temperature readings at any point during the year or given month) calculated based on data at said location from 1991 to 2020.) extremes 1925–present)
Month	Jan	Feb	Mar	Apr	May	Jun	Jul	Aug	Sep	Oct	Nov	Dec	Year
Record high °F (°C)	63 (17)	65 (18)	84 (29)	90 (32)	96 (36)	98 (37)	99 (37)	104 (40)	99 (37)	92 (33)	75 (24)	65 (18)	104 (40)
Mean maximum °F (°C)	48.9 (9.4)	47.7 (8.7)	57.9 (14.4)	73.0 (22.8)	84.6 (29.2)	90.2 (32.3)	91.5 (33.1)	90.3 (32.4)	86.0 (30.0)	73.8 (23.2)	63.5 (17.5)	54.1 (12.3)	93.9 (34.4)
Mean daily maximum °F (°C)	28.1 (−2.2)	31.2 (−0.4)	40.1 (4.5)	53.2 (11.8)	65.7 (18.7)	74.7 (23.7)	80.4 (26.9)	79.4 (26.3)	71.0 (21.7)	58.2 (14.6)	45.8 (7.7)	34.5 (1.4)	55.2 (12.9)
Daily mean °F (°C)	18.5 (−7.5)	21.0 (−6.1)	30.6 (−0.8)	42.8 (6.0)	54.5 (12.5)	63.6 (17.6)	69.5 (20.8)	68.2 (20.1)	59.9 (15.5)	48.2 (9.0)	37.3 (2.9)	25.9 (−3.4)	45.0 (7.2)
Mean daily minimum °F (°C)	9.0 (−12.8)	10.9 (−11.7)	21.1 (−6.1)	32.4 (0.2)	43.3 (6.3)	52.6 (11.4)	58.6 (14.8)	57.0 (13.9)	48.8 (9.3)	38.2 (3.4)	28.8 (−1.8)	17.3 (−8.2)	34.8 (1.6)
Mean minimum °F (°C)	−14.1 (−25.6)	−11.2 (−24.0)	−2.1 (−18.9)	20.3 (−6.5)	30.8 (−0.7)	40.7 (4.8)	48.4 (9.1)	45.2 (7.3)	33.5 (0.8)	24.3 (−4.3)	12.6 (−10.8)	−3.2 (−19.6)	−16.9 (−27.2)
Record low °F (°C)	−29 (−34)	−32 (−36)	−16 (−27)	4 (−16)	23 (−5)	29 (−2)	37 (3)	29 (−2)	23 (−5)	11 (−12)	−3 (−19)	−27 (−33)	−32 (−36)
Average precipitation inches (mm)	3.17 (81)	2.38 (60)	3.22 (82)	3.61 (92)	3.34 (85)	3.87 (98)	3.16 (80)	3.06 (78)	3.76 (96)	4.58 (116)	3.84 (98)	3.72 (94)	41.71 (1,059)
Average snowfall inches (cm)	18.6 (47)	17.5 (44)	15.2 (39)	3.7 (9.4)	0.0 (0.0)	0.0 (0.0)	0.0 (0.0)	0.0 (0.0)	0.0 (0.0)	0.6 (1.5)	4.3 (11)	14.7 (37)	74.6 (189)
Average extreme snow depth inches (cm)	14.5 (37)	16.3 (41)	14.2 (36)	4.0 (10)	0.0 (0.0)	0.0 (0.0)	0.0 (0.0)	0.0 (0.0)	0.0 (0.0)	0.1 (0.25)	2.3 (5.8)	8.0 (20)	18.7 (47)
Average precipitation days (≥ 0.01 in)	11.2	9.9	11.3	11.6	12.4	12.2	10.9	9.8	9.4	11.4	11.3	12.6	134.0
Average snowy days (≥ 0.1 in)	8.0	7.6	5.4	1.7	0.0	0.0	0.0	0.0	0.0	0.2	2.0	6.4	31.3
Average relative humidity (%)	84	85	84	77	77	79	79	79	79	79	78	81	80
Mean daily sunshine hours	4.6	4.0	5.1	7.0	7.9	8.6	9.6	9.9	8.2	6.2	4.9	4.4	6.7
Mean daily daylight hours	9.3	10.5	12.0	13.5	14.9	15.5	15.2	14.0	12.5	10.9	9.6	8.9	12.2
Average ultraviolet index	2	2	2	3	4	5	5	5	4	2	2	2	3
Source 1: NOAA
Source 2: Weather Atlas (UV and humidity)

== Demographics ==
Historical population
Census	Pop.	Note	%±
1800	277		—
1810	850		206.9%
1820	1,221		43.6%
1830	2,867		134.8%
1840	8,627		200.9%
1850	14,432		67.3%
1860	16,407		13.7%
1870	18,289		11.5%
1880	16,856		−7.8%
1890	19,103		13.3%
1900	21,850		14.4%
1910	24,803		13.5%
1920	25,978		4.7%
1930	28,749		10.7%
1940	29,822		3.7%
1950	31,558		5.8%
1960	38,912		23.3%
1970	33,168		−14.8%
1980	31,643		−4.6%
1990	33,181		4.9%
2000	31,473		−5.1%
2010	33,039		5.0%
2020	31,753		−3.9%
2022 (est.)	31,588		−0.5%

As of 2008, Bangor is the third most populous city in Maine, as it has been for more than a century. As of 2012, the estimated population of the Bangor Metropolitan Area (which includes Penobscot County) is 153,746, indicating a slight growth rate since 2000, almost all of it accounted for by Bangor.

Historically Bangor received many immigrants as it industrialized. Irish-Catholic and later Jewish immigrants eventually became established members of the community, along with many migrants from Atlantic Canada. Of the 205 Black citizens who lived in Bangor in 1910, over a third were originally from Canada.

=== 2020 census ===
As of the 2020 census, Bangor had a population of 31,753. The population density was 926.9 inhabitants per square mile (357.9/km^{2}). The median age was 39.8 years. 16.7% of residents were under the age of 18 and 19.1% of residents were 65 years of age or older. For every 100 females there were 93.1 males, and for every 100 females age 18 and over there were 91.1 males age 18 and over.

92.4% of residents lived in urban areas, while 7.6% lived in rural areas.

There were 14,607 households in Bangor, of which 20.9% had children under the age of 18 living in them. Of all households, 31.0% were married-couple households, 24.0% were households with a male householder and no spouse or partner present, and 34.9% were households with a female householder and no spouse or partner present. About 40.5% of all households were made up of individuals and 14.4% had someone living alone who was 65 years of age or older.

There were 15,900 housing units, of which 8.1% were vacant. The housing unit density was 464.1 per square mile (179.2/km^{2}). The homeowner vacancy rate was 1.6% and the rental vacancy rate was 6.3%.

Racial composition as of the 2020 census
Race	Number	Percent
White	27,933	88.0%
Black or African American	729	2.3%
American Indian and Alaska Native	314	1.0%
Asian	699	2.2%
Native Hawaiian and Other Pacific Islander	9	0.0%
Some other race	281	0.9%
Two or more races	1,788	5.6%
Hispanic or Latino (of any race)	774	2.4%

=== 2010 census ===
As of the census of 2010, there were 33,039 people, 14,475 households, and 7,182 families residing in the city. The population density was 964.4 inhabitants per square mile (372.4/km^{2}). There were 15,674 housing units at an average density of 457.5 per square mile (176.6/km^{2}). The racial makeup of the city was 93.1% White, 1.7% African American, 1.2% Native American, 1.7% Asian, 0.3% from other races, and 2.0% from two or more races. Hispanic or Latino of any race were 1.5% of the population.

There were 14,475 households, of which 24.2% had children under the age of 18 living with them, 32.8% were married couples living together, 12.6% had a female householder with no husband present, 4.2% had a male householder with no wife present, and 50.4% were non-families. 37.9% of all households were made up of individuals, and 12.4% had someone living alone who was 65 years of age or older. The average household size was 2.10 and the average family size was 2.76.

The median age in the city was 36.7 years. 17.8% of residents were under the age of 18; 16% were between the ages of 18 and 24; 26% were from 25 to 44; 25.8% were from 45 to 64; and 14.4% were 65 years of age or older. The gender makeup of the city was 48.2% male and 51.8% female.

== Economy ==
Major employers in the region include:

- Services and retail: Hannaford Supermarkets, Shaw's and Star Market, Bangor Savings Bank, Walmart, Hollywood Casino.
- Finance: The Bangor Savings Bank, founded in 1852, is Maine's largest independent bank; as of 2013, it had more than $2.8 billion in assets and the largest share of the 13-bank Bangor market.
- Healthcare: Eastern Maine Medical Center (now Northern Light Healthcare), Acadia Hospital, St. Joseph's Healthcare, Community Health & Counseling Services.
- Education: University of Maine, Beal University, Husson University, Eastern Maine Community College
- Manufacturing: General Electric.

Bangor is the largest market town, distribution center, transportation hub, and media center in a five-county area whose population tops 330,000 and which includes Penobscot, Piscataquis, Hancock, Aroostook, and Washington counties.

Bangor's city council has approved a resolution opposing the sale of sweat-shop-produced clothing in local stores.

=== Tourism ===
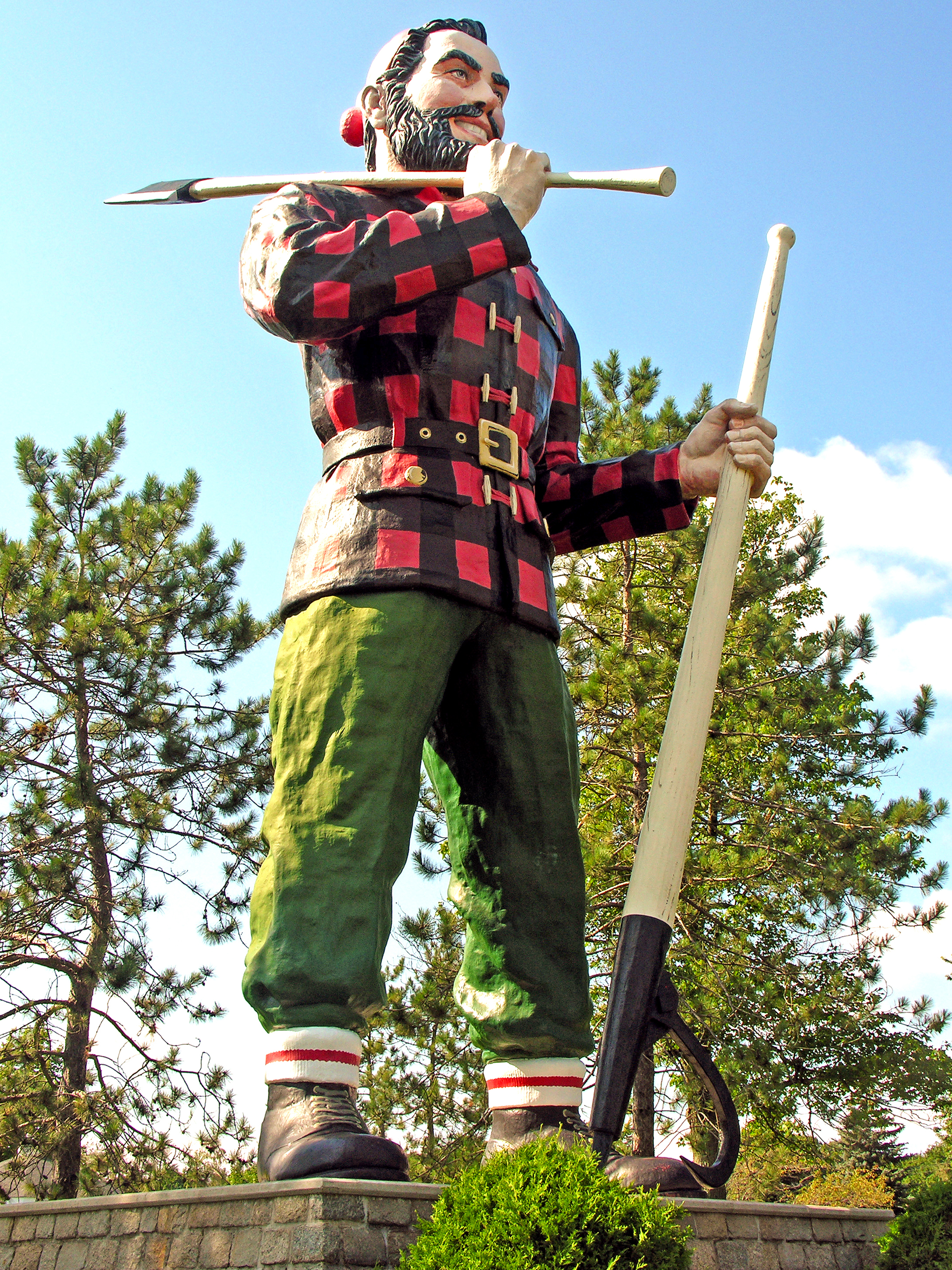
Paul Bunyan statue

Outdoor activities in the Bangor City Forest and other nearby parks, forests, and waterways include hiking, sailing, canoeing, hunting, fishing, skiing, and snowmobiling.

Bangor Raceway at the Bass Park Civic Center and Auditorium offers live, pari-mutuel harness racing from May through July and then briefly in the fall. Hollywood Casino, operated by Penn National Gaming, originally opened as a slot machine only facility. In 2007, construction began on a $131-million casino complex in Bangor that houses, among other things, a gaming floor with about 1,000 slot machines, an off-track betting center, a seven-story hotel, and a four-level parking garage. In 2011, it was authorized to add table games.

=== Military installations ===
Bangor Air National Guard Base is a United States Air National Guard base. Created in 1927 as a commercial field, it was taken over by the U.S. Army just before World War II. In 1968, the base was sold to the city of Bangor, Maine, to become Bangor International Airport but has since continued to host the 101st Air Refueling Wing, Maine Air National Guard, part of the Northeast Tanker Task Force.

In 1990, the USAF East Coast Radar System (ECRS) Operation Center was activated in Bangor with over 400 personnel. The center controlled the over-the-horizon radar's transmitter in Moscow, Maine, and receiver in Columbia Falls, Maine. With the end of the Cold War, the facility's mission of guarding against a Soviet air attack became superfluous, and though it briefly turned its attention toward drug interdiction, the system was decommissioned in 1997 as the SSPARS system installation—the successor to the PAVE PAWS installation—in Massachusetts' Cape Cod Air Force Station reservation fully took over.

== Arts and culture ==
=== Events ===
- One of the country's oldest fairs, the Bangor State fair has occurred annually for more than 150 years. Beginning on the last Friday of July, it features agricultural exhibits, rides, and live performances.
- The annual KahBang Music and Art Festival (now defunct).
- The annual American Folk Festival (now defunct).

=== Venues ===
- The Cross Insurance Center (which replaced the Bangor Auditorium in 2013)
- Maine Savings Amphitheater
- The Gracie Theatre at Husson University

=== Cultural institutions ===
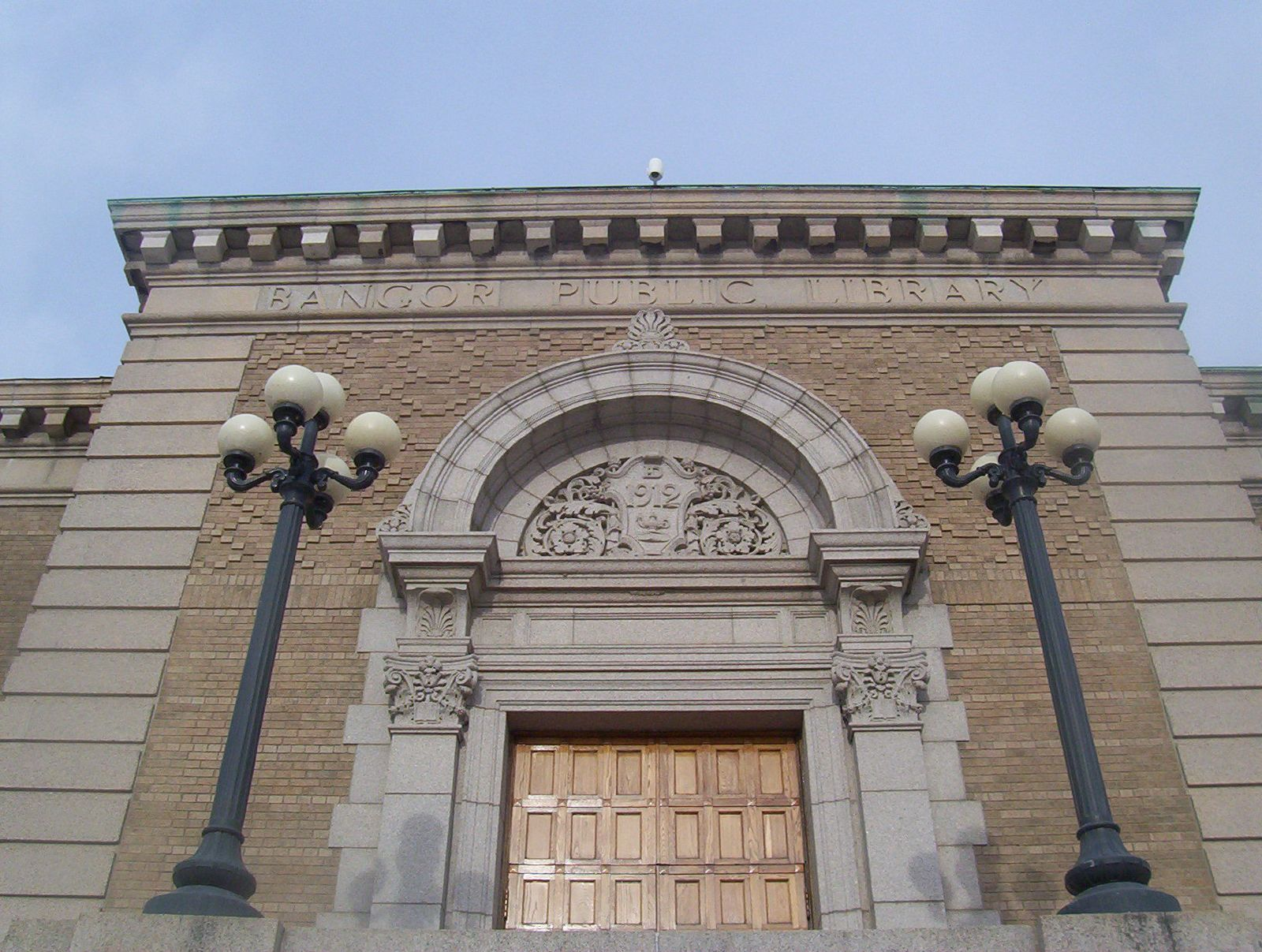
Bangor Public Library main entrance

- The University of Maine Museum of Art and the Maine Discovery Museum, a major children's museum was founded in 2001 in the former Freese's Department Store.
- The Bangor Symphony Orchestra.
- The Penobscot Theatre Company
- The Collins Center for the Arts
- The International Cryptozoology Museum

=== Architecture ===
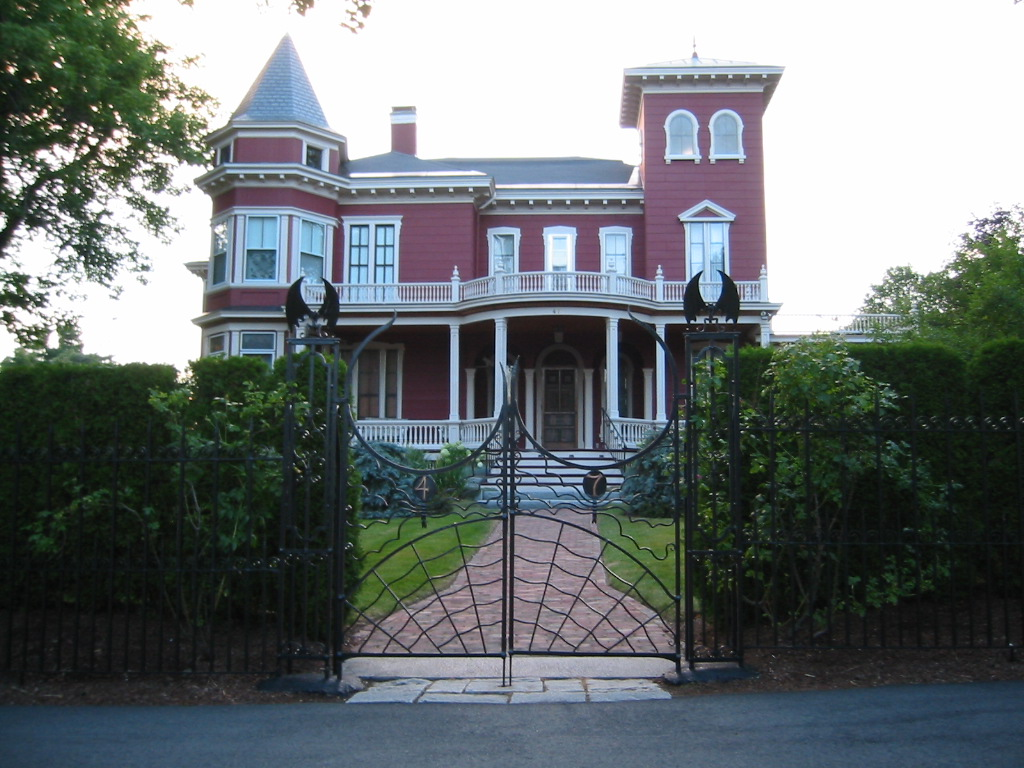
Stephen King's 1858 house

Many buildings and monuments are listed on the National Register of Historic Places. The city has also had a municipal Historic Preservation Commission since the early 1980s. Bangor has many Greek Revival, Victorian, and Colonial Revival houses. Some notable architecture:

- The Thomas Hill Standpipe, a shingle style structure.
- The Hammond Street Congregational Church.
- The St. John's Catholic Church.
- The Bangor House Hotel, now converted to apartments, is the only survivor among a series of "Palace Hotels" designed by Boston architect Isaiah Rogers, which were the first of their kind in the United States.
- The country's second oldest garden cemetery is the Mount Hope Cemetery, designed by Charles G. Bryant.
- Richard Upjohn, British-born architect and early promoter of the Gothic Revival style, received some of his first commissions in Bangor, including the Isaac Farrar House (1833), Samuel Farrar House (1836), Thomas A. Hill House (presently owned by the Bangor Historical Society), and St. John's Church (Episcopal, 1836–1839).
- Bangor Public Library by Peabody and Stearns.
- The Eastern Maine Insane Hospital, now Dorothea Dix Psychiatric Center, by John Calvin Stevens.
- The William Arnold House of 1856, an Italianate style mansion and home to author Stephen King. Its wrought-iron fence with bat and spider web motif is King's own addition.

=== Public art and monuments ===
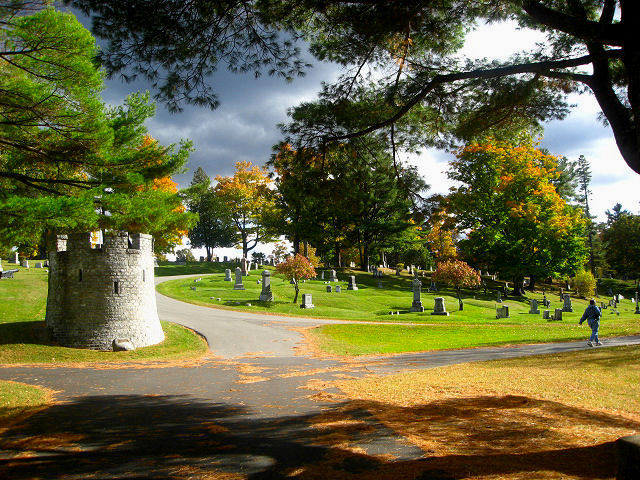
Mount Hope Cemetery

The bow-plate of the battleship USS Maine, whose destruction in Havana, Cuba, presaged the start of the Spanish–American War, survives on a granite memorial by Charles Eugene Tefft in Davenport Park.

Bangor has a large fiberglass-over-metal statue of mythical lumberman Paul Bunyan by Normand Martin (1959).

There are three large bronze statues in downtown Bangor by sculptor Charles Eugene Tefft of Brewer, including the Luther H. Peirce Memorial, commemorating the Penobscot River Log-Drivers; a statue of Hannibal Hamlin at Kenduskeag Mall; and an image of "Lady Victory" at Norumbega Parkway.

The abstract aluminum sculpture "Continuity of Community" (1969) on the Bangor Waterfront, formerly in West Market Square, is by the Castine sculptor Clark Battle Fitz-Gerald.

The U.S. Post Office in Bangor contains Yvonne Jacquette's 1980 three-part mural "Autumn Expansion".

A 1962 bronze commemorating the 2nd Maine Volunteer Infantry Regiment by Wisconsin sculptor Owen Vernon Shaffer stands at the entrance to Mount Hope Cemetery.

A memorial has been placed by Bangor City Council and members of the LGBT community along the Kenduskeag Stream honoring the memory of Charlie Howard as the victim of a hate crime. In 1984 he was beaten and thrown off Bangor's State Street Bridge by three young men in a what would become a high-profile example of violence against LGBT people. The murder of Charlie Howard inspired the formation of The Maine Lesbian/Gay Political Alliance, which later became EqualityMaine. In May 2011, vandals spray-painted graffiti and an anti-gay slur on the memorial. Family and friends cleaned it up and rededicated it.

== Sports ==
From 2002 to 2017, Bangor had been home to Little League International's Senior League World Series.

Bangor was home to two minor league baseball teams affiliated with the 1995–1998 Northeast League: the Bangor Blue Ox (1996–1997) and the Bangor Lumberjacks (2003–2004). Even earlier the Bangor Millionaires (1894–1896) played in the New England League.

Vince McMahon promoted his first professional wrestling event in Bangor in 1979. In 1985, the WWC Universal Heavyweight Championship changed hands for the first time outside of Puerto Rico at an IWCCW show in Bangor.

The Penobscot is a salmon-fishing river; the Penobscot Salmon Club traditionally sent the first fish caught to the President of the United States. From 1999 to 2006, low fish stocks resulted in a ban on salmon fishing. Today, the wild salmon population (and the sport) is slowly recovering. The Penobscot River Restoration Project is working to help the fish population by removing some dams north of Bangor.

The Kenduskeag Stream Canoe Race, a white-water event which begins just north of Bangor in Kenduskeag, has been held since 1965.

== Government ==
Bangor is the county seat of Penobscot County.

Since 1931, Bangor has had a council–manager form of government. The nine-member city council is a nonpartisan body, with three city councilors elected to three-year terms each year. The nine council members elect the chair of the city council, who is referred to informally as the mayor, and plays the role when there is a ceremonial need. As of 2025, the council members are Michael Beck, Susan Deane, Carolyn Fish, Rick Fournier, Susan Hawes, Joseph Leonard, Cara Pelletier (chair), Wayne Mallar, and Dan Tremble.

In 2007, Bangor was the first city in the U.S. to ban smoking in vehicles carrying passengers under the age of 18.

In 2012, Bangor's city council passed an order in support of same-sex marriage in Maine. In 2013, the City of Bangor also signed an amicus brief to the United States Supreme Court calling for the federal Defense of Marriage Act to be struck down.

In the United States House of Representatives, Bangor is included in Maine's 2nd congressional district and is currently represented by Democrat Jared F. Golden.

Voter registration
Voter Registration and Party Enrollment as of November 2016
Party	Total Voters	Percentage
Unenrolled/Independent	8,990	36.98%
Democratic	7,952	32.71%
Republican	6,274	25.81%
Green Independent	806	3.32%
Libertarian	288	1.18%
Total	24,310	100.00%

Voter registration
Voter Registration and Party Enrollment as of November 2024
Party	Total Voters	Percentage
Democratic	7,582	37.03%
Unenrolled/Independent	6,004	29.32%
Republican	5,488	26.8%
No Labels	616	3.01%
Green Independent	592	2.89%
Libertarian	194	0.95%
Total	20,476	100.00%

=== Law and order ===
In 2008 Bangor's crime rate was the second-lowest among American metropolitan areas of comparable size. As of 2014 Bangor had the third highest rate of property crime in Maine.

The arrival of Irish immigrants from nearby Canada beginning in the 1830s, and their competition with locals for jobs, sparked a deadly sectarian riot in 1833 that lasted for days and had to be put down by militia. Realizing the need for a police force, the town incorporated as The City of Bangor in 1834. In the 1800s, sailors and loggers gave the city a reputation for roughness; their stomping grounds were known as the "Devil's Half Acre". The same name was also applied, at roughly the same time, to The Devil's Half-Acre, Pennsylvania.

Although Maine was the first "dry" state (i.e. the first to prohibit the sale of alcohol, with the passage of the "Maine law" in 1851), Bangor managed to remain "wet". The city had 142 saloons in 1890. A look-the-other-way attitude by local police and politicians (sustained by a system of bribery in the form of ritualized fine-payments known as "The Bangor Plan") allowed Bangor to flout the nation's most long-standing state prohibition law. In 1913, the war of the "drys" (prohibitionists) on "wet" Bangor escalated when the Penobscot County Sheriff was impeached and removed by the Maine Legislature for not enforcing anti-liquor laws. His successor was asked to resign by the governor the following year for the same reason, but refused. A third sheriff was removed by the governor in 1918, but promptly re-nominated by the Democratic Party. Prohibitionist Carrie Nation had been forcibly expelled from the Bangor House hotel in 1902 after causing a disturbance.

In October 1937, "public enemy" Al Brady and another member of his "Brady Gang" (Clarence Shaffer) were killed in the bloodiest shootout in Maine's history. FBI agents ambushed Brady, Shaffer, and James Dalhover on Bangor's Central Street after they had attempted to purchase a Thompson submachine gun from Dakin's Sporting Goods downtown. Brady is buried in the public section of Mount Hope Cemetery, on the north side of Mount Hope Avenue. Until recently, Brady's grave was unmarked. A group of schoolchildren erected a wooden marker over his grave in the 1990s, which was replaced by a more permanent stone in 2007.

== Education ==
Universities and colleges

- The University of Maine (originally The Maine State College) was founded in Orono in 1868. It is part of the University of Maine System.
- The Bangor campus of the University of Maine at Augusta.
- Husson University enrolls about 3,500 students a year in a variety of undergraduate and graduate programs.
- Beal University was founded in 1891 and offers degrees in nursing, healthcare, business and more.
- The Bangor Theological Seminary, founded in 1814, was the only accredited graduate school of religion in northern New England. Closed in 2013.

Bangor School Department operates public schools, including Bangor High School, the only public high school in the municipality.

Private schools include:

- The private John Bapst Memorial High School. In 2012 it was ranked in the top 20% nationally by the Washington Post High School Challenge.
- The private Bangor Christian Schools
- All Saints Catholic School, of the Roman Catholic Diocese of Portland, is in Bangor.

== Media ==
The Bangor region has a large number of media outlets for an area its size. The city has an unbroken history of newspaper publishing extending from 1815. Almost thirty dailies, weeklies, and monthlies had been launched there by the end of the Civil War.

The Bangor Daily News was founded in 1889, and is one of the few remaining family-owned newspapers left in the United States. The Maine Edge is published from Bangor.

Bangor has more than a dozen radio stations and seven television stations, including WLBZ 2 (NBC), WABI 5 (CBS; CW on DT2), WVII 7 (ABC), WBGR-LD 33 (MeTV), and WFVX-LD 22 (Fox/MyNetworkTV). Maine Public Broadcasting Network outlet WMEB 12, licensed to nearby Orono, is the area's PBS member station. Radio stations in the city include WKIT and WZON, owned by Zone Radio Corporation, a company owned by Bangor resident novelist Stephen King. WHSN is a non-commercial alternative rock station licensed to Bangor and run and operated by staff and students at the New England School of Communications on the campus of Husson University. Several other stations in the market are owned by Blueberry Broadcasting and Townsquare Media.

== Infrastructure ==
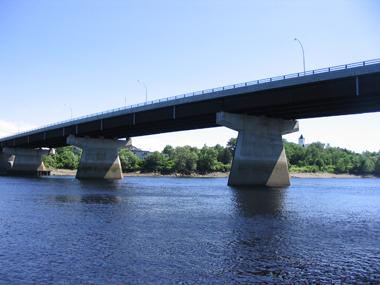
Penobscot Bridge

=== Road ===
Bangor sits along interstates I-95 and I-395; U.S. highways US 1A, US 2, US Route 2A, US 202; and state routes SR 9, SR 9 Business, SR 15, SR 15 Business, SR 100, and SR 222. Three major bridges connect the city to neighboring Brewer: Joshua Chamberlain Bridge (carrying US 1A), Penobscot River Bridge (carrying SR 15), and the Veterans Remembrance Bridge (carrying I-395).

Daily intercity bus service from Bangor proper is provided by two companies. Concord Coach Lines connects Bangor with Augusta, Portland, several towns in Maine's midcoast region, and Boston, Massachusetts. Cyr Bus Lines provides daily service to Caribou and several northern Maine towns along I-95 and Route 1. The area is also served by Greyhound, which operates out of the Park and Ride lot at 360 Odlin Road. West's Bus Service provides service between Bangor and Calais.

In 2011, Acadian Lines ended bus service to Saint John, New Brunswick, because of low ticket sales.

The Community Connector system offers public transportation within Bangor and to adjacent towns such as Orono. There is also a seasonal (summer) shuttle between Bangor and Bar Harbor.

=== Rail ===
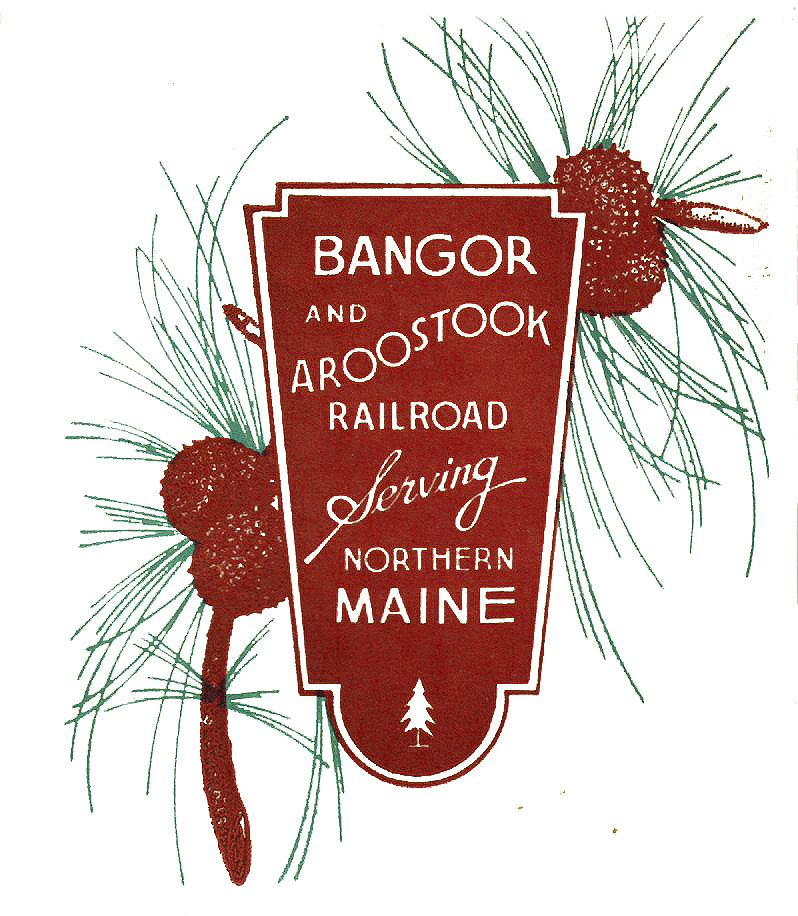
Bangor Aroostook Railway Logo, 1918

Freight service is provided by Pan Am Railways and Central Maine and Quebec Railway, the latter being a successor to locally based Bangor and Aroostook Railroad and Montreal, Maine and Atlantic Railway.

Passenger rail service was discontinued by the BAR in 1961.

For historic Bangor trolley service see Bangor Railway and Electric Company.

==== Rail accidents ====
- 1869: The Black Island Railroad Bridge north of Old Town, Maine collapsed under the weight of a Bangor and Piscataquis Railroad train, killing 3 crew and injuring 7–8 others.
- 1871: A bridge in Hampden collapsed under the weight of a Maine Central Railroad train approaching Bangor, killing 2 and injuring 50.
- 1898: A Maine Central Railroad train crashed near Orono killing 2 and fatally injuring 4. The president of the railroad and his wife were also on board in a private car, but escaped injury. Train Wrecked in Maine
- 1899: The collapse of a gangway between a train and a waiting ferry at Mount Desert sent 200 members of a Bangor excursion party into the water, drowning 20.
- 1911: A head-on collision of two trains north of Bangor, in Grindstone, killed 15, including 5 members of the Presque Isle Brass Band.

=== Air ===
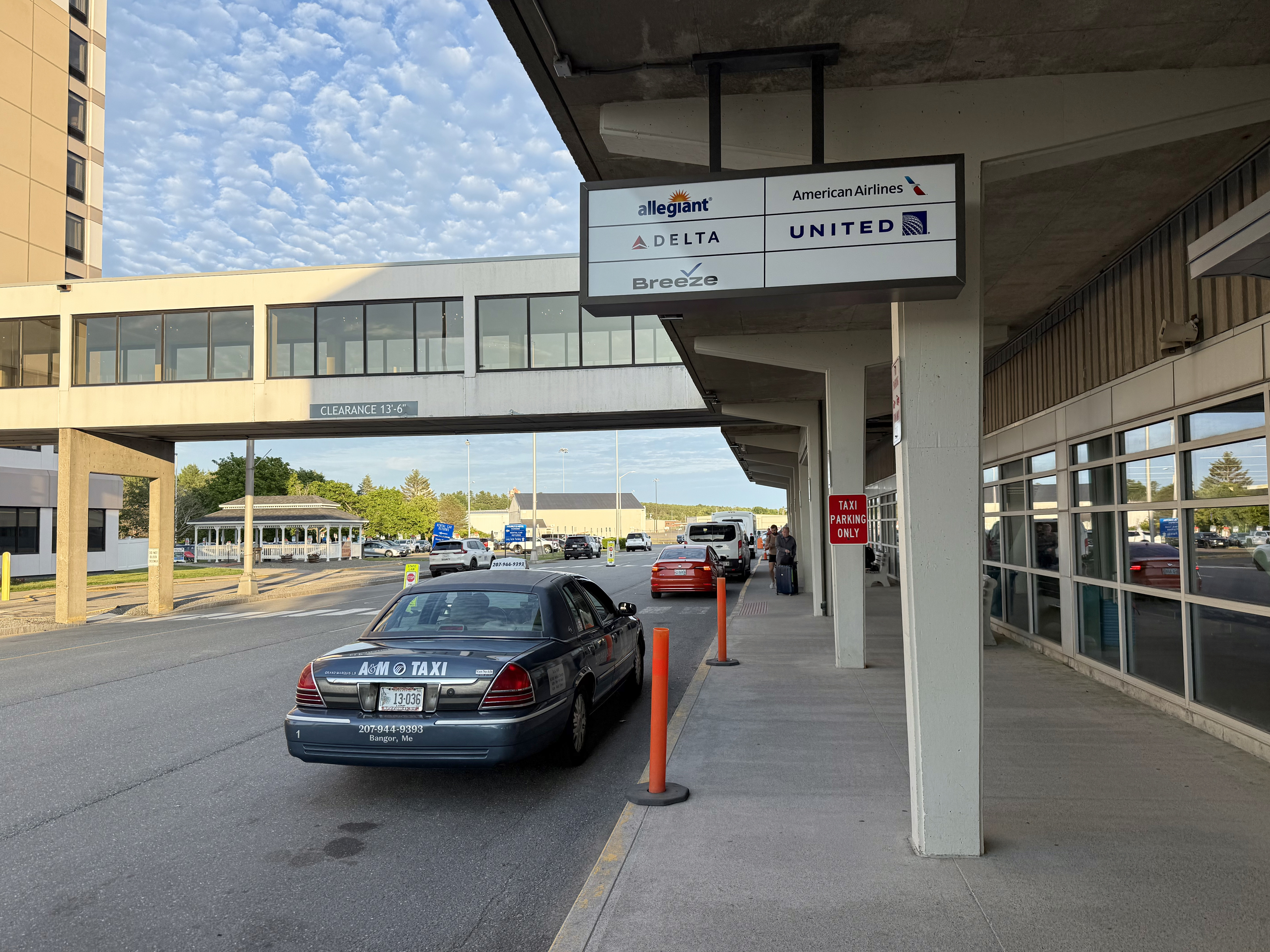
Bangor International Airport

Bangor International Airport (IATA: BGR, ICAO: KBGR) is a joint civil-military public airport 3 miles (4.8 kilometres) west of the city. It has a single runway measuring 11,439 by 200 ft (3,487 by 61 m). Bangor is the last (or first) American airport along the great circle route between the U.S. East Coast and Europe, and in the 1970s and '80s it was a refuelling stop, until the development of longer-range jets in the 1990s.

=== Healthcare ===
==== Hospitals ====
Bangor is home to two large hospitals, the Eastern Maine Medical Center and the Catholic-affiliated St. Joseph Hospital.

==== Pandemics ====
In 1832, a cholera epidemic in Saint John, New Brunswick, (part of the Second cholera pandemic) sent as many as eight hundred poor Irish immigrants walking to Bangor. This was the beginning of Maine's first substantial Irish-Catholic community. Competition with Americans for jobs caused a riot and resulting fire in 1833. In 1849–50, the Second cholera pandemic reached Bangor itself, killing 20–30 within the first week, 112 had died by October 1849. The final death toll was 161. A late outbreak of the disease in 1854 killed seventeen others. The victims in most cases were poor Irish immigrants. In 1872, a smallpox epidemic closed local schools. The Spanish flu pandemic of 1918, which was global in scope, struck over a thousand Bangoreans and killed more than a hundred. This was the worst 'natural disaster' in the city's history since the cholera epidemic of 1849.

== Sister cities ==
- Harbin, Heilongjiang, China
- Saint John, New Brunswick, Canada

== Notable people ==
- List of people from Bangor, Maine
