= Trey Stewart =

American politician (born 1994)

Minority Leader of the Maine Senate
- Incumbent
- Assumed office December 7, 2022
- Preceded by: Jeff Timberlake

Member of the Maine Senate from the 2nd district
- Incumbent
- Assumed office December 2, 2020
- Preceded by: Michael E. Carpenter

Member of the Maine House of Representatives from the 147th district
- In office December 7, 2016 – December 2, 2020
- Preceded by: Robert Saucier
- Succeeded by: Joseph F. Underwood

Personal details
- Born: February 7, 1994 (age 32) Presque Isle, Maine, U.S.
- Party: Republican
- Education: University of Maine (BA, MBA, JD)

Harold L. "Trey" Stewart III (born February 7, 1994) is an American politician from Maine. Stewart, a Republican from Presque Isle, has represented District 2 in the Maine Senate since 2020 when he defeated Democratic incumbent Michael E. Carpenter. From 2016 to 2020, Stewart served in the Maine House of Representatives. During the 2019–20 session, he served as Assistant Minority Leader.

Stewart announced a campaign for Maine's 2nd congressional district in 2022, challenging incumbent Democrat Jared Golden, but later withdrew and chose to run for re-election to the State Senate following the entry of former Congressman Bruce Poliquin.

Following his re-election in November 2022, Stewart was elected by his Republican caucus colleagues as Senate Minority Leader. He was re-elected to a third term in 2024, and was again chosen as Senate Minority Leader.

== Background ==
Stewart earned a BA in political science and sociology (2016) and an MBA from the University of Maine (2018). He graduated from the University of Maine School of Law in 2022 and was admitted to the Maine State Bar Association later that same year. Stewart also serves as a reservist in the United States Navy and previously served as a volunteer firefighter in his hometown of Presque Isle, Maine.

Maine Senate
Preceded by Jeff Timberlake	Minority Leader of the Maine Senate; 2022–present	Incumbent
