= Bruce Poliquin =

American politician (born 1953)

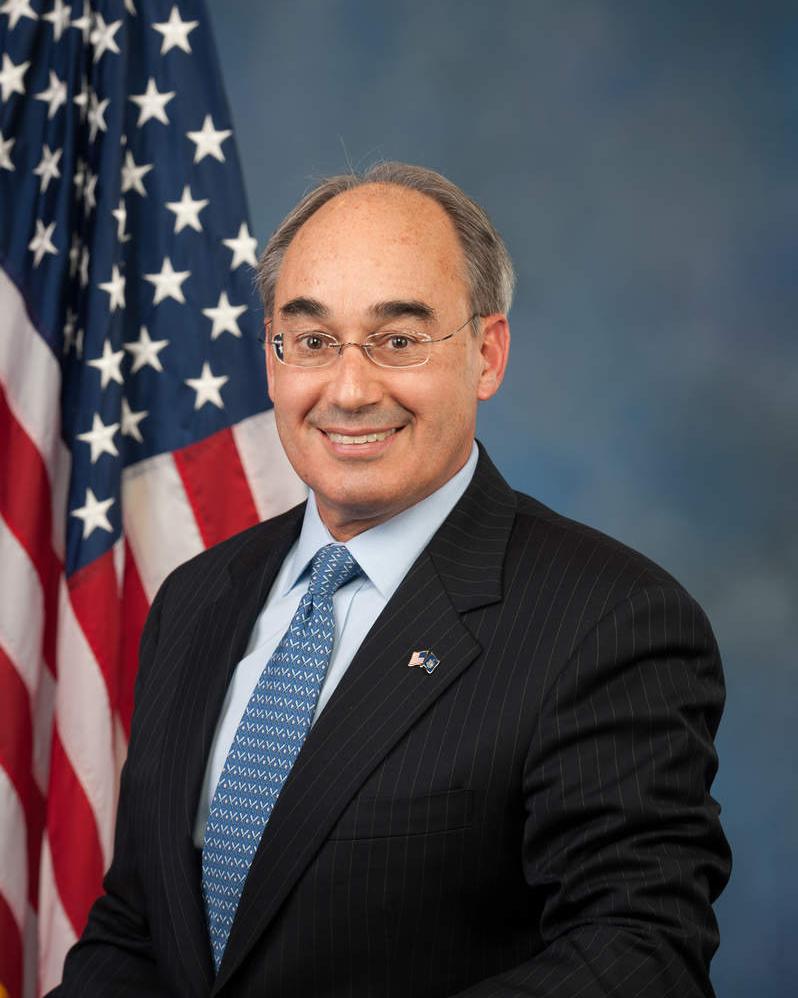
- Official portrait, 2015

Member of the U.S. House of Representatives from Maine's 2nd district
- In office January 3, 2015 – January 3, 2019
- Preceded by: Mike Michaud
- Succeeded by: Jared Golden

49th Treasurer of Maine
- In office January 5, 2011 – January 7, 2013
- Governor: Paul LePage
- Preceded by: David Lemoine
- Succeeded by: Neria Douglass

Personal details
- Born: Bruce Lee Poliquin; November 1, 1953 (age 73) Waterville, Maine, U.S.
- Party: Republican
- Spouses: Jane Carpenter (m. 1989; died 1992); Judith Arbuckle (m. 2004; div. 2009)
- Children: 1
- Education: Harvard University (BA)

Bruce Lee Poliquin (/ˈpɒlɪˌkwɪn/; born November 1, 1953) is an American businessman and politician. A member of the Republican Party, he represented Maine's 2nd congressional district in the United States House of Representatives from 2015 to 2019. Poliquin was first elected to Congress in the 2014 general election. From 2010 to 2012, he was the 49th Maine State Treasurer. He was a candidate for the Republican nomination for the U.S. Senate in 2012, finishing second in the primary election. In January 2017, at the start of the 115th Congress, Poliquin was the sole Republican representing a U.S. House district in New England.

Poliquin was defeated by Democrat Jared Golden in his 2018 run for reelection; he became the first incumbent to lose this seat since 1916. Poliquin claimed the ranked-choice voting process used in the election was unconstitutional and declared himself the winner because he led after the initial tally. He sued to be declared the winner and have ranked-choice voting declared unconstitutional, but his lawsuit was rejected. He conceded to Golden on December 24, 2018. Poliquin unsuccessfully challenged Golden in a 2022 rematch.

== Early life ==
Poliquin was born and raised in Waterville, Maine. He grew up in a family of French-Canadian ancestry. His father was a school principal and his mother was a nurse. He attended Phillips Academy in Andover, Massachusetts, where he was a running back on the varsity football team, and graduated in 1972. He graduated from Harvard University in 1976 with a bachelor's degree in economics.

== Career ==
=== Investment management ===
After college Poliquin worked in the investment management industry in Chicago and New York City.

=== Gubernatorial campaign ===
In 2010 Poliquin sought the Maine Republican Party's nomination for governor of Maine. He spent $711,000 of his own money on the campaign and finished sixth of the seven candidates. Paul LePage won the nomination and Poliquin endorsed him. Following LePage's election in November 2010, the Maine Legislature elected Poliqiun Maine State Treasurer.

=== State Treasurer ===
In 2011 Poliquin expressed concerns about the Maine State Housing Authority's plans to construct a low-income housing complex in Portland. Poliquin cited the proposed $314,000 per unit cost as an example of irresponsible government spending. Dale McCormick, the authority's director and an appointee of Democratic governor John Baldacci, approved the proposal following a reduction in the per unit price to $265,000.

In 2012 Maine Democrats accused Poliquin of violating the state constitution by engaging in commerce while in office. The complaints against Poliquin centered around his involvement with the Popham Beach Club, a private club in Phippsburg, Maine, and Dirigo Holdings LLC, a real estate company. Maine Attorney General William Schneider advised Poliquin to disassociate himself from his business ventures but did not offer an opinion as to whether he had actually violated the Constitution. The Maine House voted unanimously to send the issue to the Maine Supreme Judicial Court to settle the matter. The Court declined to offer a ruling, concluding that there were no circumstances in Poliquin's case requiring immediate attention.

In February 2012 some Democrats criticized Poliquin for his use of the Maine Tree Growth Tax Program, a program meant to preserve forestland from development pressures for commercial timber harvesting, with 10 acres of his oceanfront property in Georgetown. The program reduced the value of his property from the originally assessed $1.8 million to $725,500, resulting in Poliquin paying $30 a year in property taxes. A 2009 Maine Forest Service report discussed Poliquin's property as an example of one that might not be fully complying with the law, stating that restrictions on timber harvesting in shoreland areas would limit any commercial use of the land. But the report acknowledged that as long as the property was 10 acres it could remain in the program. Poliquin later transferred the property in question to the Open Space program, a less generous tax abatement program. He said the issue was a distraction for the town and was politically motivated by Democrats' dissatisfaction with his policies as treasurer.

At the end of his term Poliquin wrote an op-ed in the Bangor Daily News with a list of his accomplishments as treasurer. These included reforms to the state workers' pension plan, efforts to reduce the cost of affordable housing, reduced wasteful spending, and retention of the state's Aa2 bond rating.

=== Post-treasurer career ===
In March 2012 Poliquin announced his candidacy for the U.S. Senate seat being vacated by Olympia Snowe. He lost the Republican primary to Charlie Summers, who lost the general election to Independent former governor Angus King.

On July 10, 2013, Poliquin said he was not interested in becoming the chairman of the Maine Republican Party, despite encouragement to do so from many Republicans, including Governor LePage.

== U.S. House of Representatives ==
=== Elections ===
==== 2014 ====
In August 2013, Poliquin announced he would seek the Maine Republican Party's nomination for the Second Congressional District.

Poliquin won the primary election against former Maine Senate President Kevin Raye and faced Democratic state senator Emily Cain and Independent retired Navy captain Blaine Richardson in the general election. Poliquin won with 47% of the vote.

==== 2016 ====
Poliquin ran for reelection in 2016. He was a member of the National Republican Congressional Committee's Patriot Program, which was designed to help protect vulnerable Republican incumbents in the 2016 election. Poliquin ran unopposed in the primary election. He faced Democrat Emily Cain, whom he beat in 2014, in the November 8 general election. Poliquin defeated Cain with 55% of the vote.

==== 2018 ====
Describing Poliquin on February 10, 2018, as "the last of an endangered species" as a House Republican from New England, the Boston Globe wrote that his "fight against extinction" was "looking more dire", with "Democrats' leaders looking to make New England a clean sweep in 2018".

In the general election Poliquin faced Democratic nominee Jared Golden and independent candidates Tiffany Bond and Will Hoar. At an October debate Poliquin refused to commit to accepting the results of Maine's ranked-choice election if he lost. After the election Poliquin sued to block the ranked-choice tabulation of results before it began. The judge denied his request on November 15, and rejected Poliquin's lawsuit on December 13.

On election night, Poliquin led Golden by 2,000 votes, but was short of a majority. Exit polls indicated that 90% of the independents' supporters ranked Golden as their second choice, which on paper was enough to give Golden the victory. Bond's and Hoar's supporters overwhelmingly ranked Golden as their second choice, allowing Golden to defeat Poliquin by nearly 3,000 votes after all votes were tabulated. It was the first time since 1916 that the district's incumbent had been unseated in an election.

On November 10, 2018, a Poliquin campaign spokesperson raised concerns about the vote count in the race, alleging some voter boxes lacked proper locks and a Bangor polling clerk counted ballots unmonitored, which the Maine Journals interpreted as an accusation of voter fraud. Maine Secretary of State Matt Dunlap called the claims "a distraction" and cautioned the campaign to avoid "irresponsible" attempts to slow down the tabulation process and erode faith in the system.

==== 2022 ====
In a rematch of 2018, Poliquin ran in the 2022 election to represent Maine's 2nd District against Democrat Jared Golden. In the Republican primary, he defeated Elizabeth Caruso, a wilderness guide and local government leader from the village of Caratunk, who raised $37,000 to Poliquin’s $2.2 million. He won the Republican primary with 60% of the vote over Caruso. Some political analysts thought Poliquin could win the general election, but he consistently trailed in the polls and lost to Golden, 53%–47%, after the ranked-choice tabulation.

=== Tenure ===
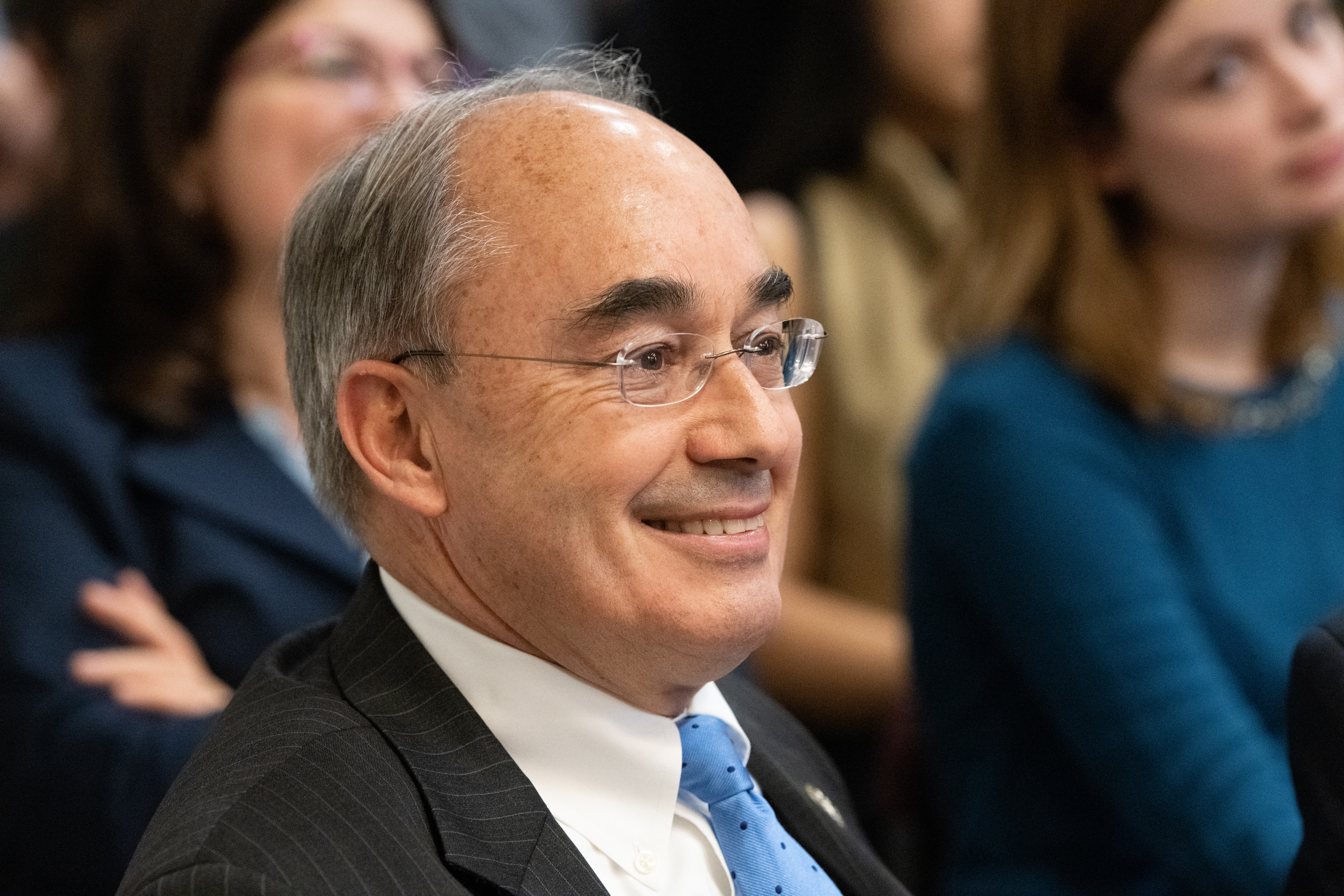
Poliquin in 2018

In January 2015, Poliquin voted for the No Taxpayer Funding for Abortion Act.

On April 29, 2015, Poliquin introduced his first bill, the Child Support Assistance Act of 2015. Co-sponsored with Rep. Keith Ellison (D-MN), it was intended to help single parents secure child support payments by making it harder for the other parent to hide property or funds. The bill was rolled into a transportation bill that passed Congress and was signed into law by President Obama on December 4, 2015.

Poliquin voted against granting the president fast-track authority in negotiating trade agreements on June 12, 2015, saying Congress should be able to help shape such agreements.

In September 2015 Poliquin was one of ten Republican U.S. House freshmen who signed a letter urging Republicans to avoid a government shutdown by passing a short-term spending bill a week before federal agencies were slated to run out of money.

In April 2016 Poliquin and Chellie Pingree (ME-1) proposed legislation that would allow Cuban-bound flights to make technical stops at American airports for refueling and restocking. The bill's purpose was to prevent American airports from losing business to Canada.

Poliquin and Niki Tsongas (MA-3) pushed legislative efforts begun during the tenure of his Democratic predecessor, Mike Michaud, to require the U.S. Department of Defense to purchase U.S.-made sneakers.

Poliquin opposed the creation of a national park or national monument in the Maine North Woods. He called for congressional hearings in the region where the proposed park is now, and said federal officials and non-local supporters ignored the concerns of local residents who opposed it. He proposed a bill to limit the president's Antiquities Act power to declare national monuments.

Poliquin was a member of the Republican Main Street Partnership and the United States Congressional International Conservation Caucus.

=== Committee assignments ===
- Committee on Financial Services
  - Subcommittee on Capital Markets and Government-Sponsored Enterprises
  - Subcommittee on Oversight and Investigations
- Republican Study Committee

=== Political positions ===
==== Taxation ====
In November 2017 Poliquin said he would vote for the new Republican tax bill, whose framers had dismissed "a late suggestion by President Donald Trump to lower the top rate on high-wage earners." As paraphrased by The Washington Times, Poliquin said the proposal "would help Maine residents by doubling the standard deduction and increasing tax credits for children ... while keeping taxes low for small businesses and making large businesses more competitive by bringing the corporate rate into line with other industrialized countries." "We want to eliminate as many of these loopholes and special-interest carve-outs that only the wealthy and well-connected are able to take advantage of," he said, describing the work on the bill as "very methodical, very transparent and very thoughtful." Noting that he had voted earlier in November "to move the tax proposal forward in the House, trusting the Senate would continue to work on it and improve it," he expressed approval of the changes Senator Susan Collins and others made "that will benefit Maine families and small businesses, such as retaining the medical expense deduction and improving the provision dealing with historic tax credits."

==== Tariffs ====
In December 2017 the International Trade Commission ruled 4–0 to activate tariffs on Chinese hardwood plywood, thus leveling the playing field for U.S. wood products, a decision Poliquin had urged upon them at an October hearing. The Democratic Leader of the Maine State Senate, Troy Jackson (D-Allagash), praised Poliquin "for his successful efforts to fight against illegal and unfair foreign trade". Garry Gillespie of Columbia Forest Products said, "On behalf of the 161 Columbia Forest Products employees in Presque Isle, Maine, we are both thrilled and thankful with the results at the ITC."

==== Healthcare ====
On February 3, 2015, Poliquin was one of three House Republicans to vote against repealing the Patient Protection and Affordable Care Act, commonly known as Obamacare. His spokesman said that while Poliquin supported repeal, the proposed bill did not offer a "free-market alternative" to immediately take its place, which he felt was needed. Poliquin was subsequently criticized by conservative groups seeking immediate repeal of the law, including the Republican Liberty Caucus, which voted on February 5, 2015, to rescind their endorsement of him. Poliquin responded that House had voted numerous times to repeal the law without effect.

In his 2016 reelection campaign Poliquin ran on repealing the Affordable Care Act. On May 4, 2017, he voted to pass the American Health Care Act, which would have effectively repealed the ACA and included cuts to Medicaid. He said it included the best parts of previous attempts to repeal the ACA. He received criticism for taking money from insurance companies and avoiding discussions of his vote to repeal. In his 2018 campaign the health care section of Poliquin's website no longer explicitly mentioned the Affordable Care Act.

In 2018, Poliquin co-sponsored legislation that would have cut $7 billion of federal aid to children's health insurance.

==== Veterans affairs ====
In October 2017, Poliquin announced plans for the Veterans Access to Long Term Care and Health Services Act, which would "reduce red tape" for nursing homes treating veterans.

In November 2017, Poliquin questioned officials of the Department of Veterans Affairs (VA) at a Veterans Affairs Committee hearing. The hearing followed a report by the Government Accountability Office detailing the VA's "failure to report potentially dangerous medical practitioners to their national database, which is intended to prevent such bad actors from crossing state lines and putting patients at risk elsewhere." Poliquin later introduced legislation requiring VA medical professionals to report malpractice at the VA to state licensing boards.

==== Immigration ====
In March 2018, Poliquin criticized his Democratic challengers, writing, "illegal immigration is still illegal. We are a country of immigrants, but we are also a Nation of Laws. People entering America must do so legally."

==== LGBT rights ====
In May 2016, Poliquin voted against a measure intended to uphold an executive order that barred discrimination against LGBT employees by religious organizations that contract with the federal government. He was one of seven House Republicans to switch their votes at the last minute under pressure from Republican House Leadership. After criticism from Democrats, he issued a statement saying, "I am outraged that political opponents or members of the press would claim or insinuate that I cast a vote due to pressure or party politics. No one controls my vote", and that he abhorred discrimination in any form.

==== Terrorism ====
In 2016, Poliquin drafted a bill that would prohibit the federal government from giving food stamps to individuals convicted of terrorism-related crimes. He said the legislation would close a loophole that allows convicted terrorists to apply for aid.

==== Iran ====
In December 2017, the House passed Poliquin's Iranian Leadership Asset Transparency Act by a 289–135 vote. His fourth bill to pass the House that year, it required the public disclosure of the assets of Iran's regime. "Reports have indicated these funds are being used to support and sponsor terrorism around the region and to undermine our own national security interests. Iran, the world's leading state sponsor of terrorism, cannot be trusted and it's important for the security of the region and for the United States for these secret funds to be exposed publicly to the world."

== Personal life ==
On February 11, 1992, Poliquin's wife, Jane, drowned in an ocean rip current swimming accident at the Palmas del Mar Beach Resort in Humacao, Puerto Rico. Poliquin's father-in-law, James Carpenter, was also killed, trying to save her. Jane's death made Poliquin a single parent to his 16-month-old son.

In 2009 Poliquin divorced his second wife, Judith Arbuckle.

While in Washington, Poliquin slept in his office, in a pull-down bed he installed in 2015.

On January 31, 2018, Poliquin was one of several members of Congress who were traveling to a legislative retreat in West Virginia when their train collided with a truck just outside Charlottesville, Virginia, killing one person. Poliquin sustained minor injuries.

On September 20, 2019, President Donald Trump nominated Poliquin as chair of the Securities Investor Protection Corporation.

Poliquin is Roman Catholic.

Political offices
Preceded by David Lemoine	Treasurer of Maine; 2011–2013	Succeeded by Neria Douglass
U.S. House of Representatives
Preceded by Mike Michaud	Member of the U.S. House of Representatives from Maine's 2nd congressional district 2015–2019	Succeeded by Jared Golden
U.S. order of precedence (ceremonial)
Preceded by Tom Andrews as Former U.S. Representative	Order of precedence of the United States as Former U.S. Representative	Succeeded by Cori Bush as Former U.S. Representative
