= Maine's 2nd State Senate district =

American legislative district

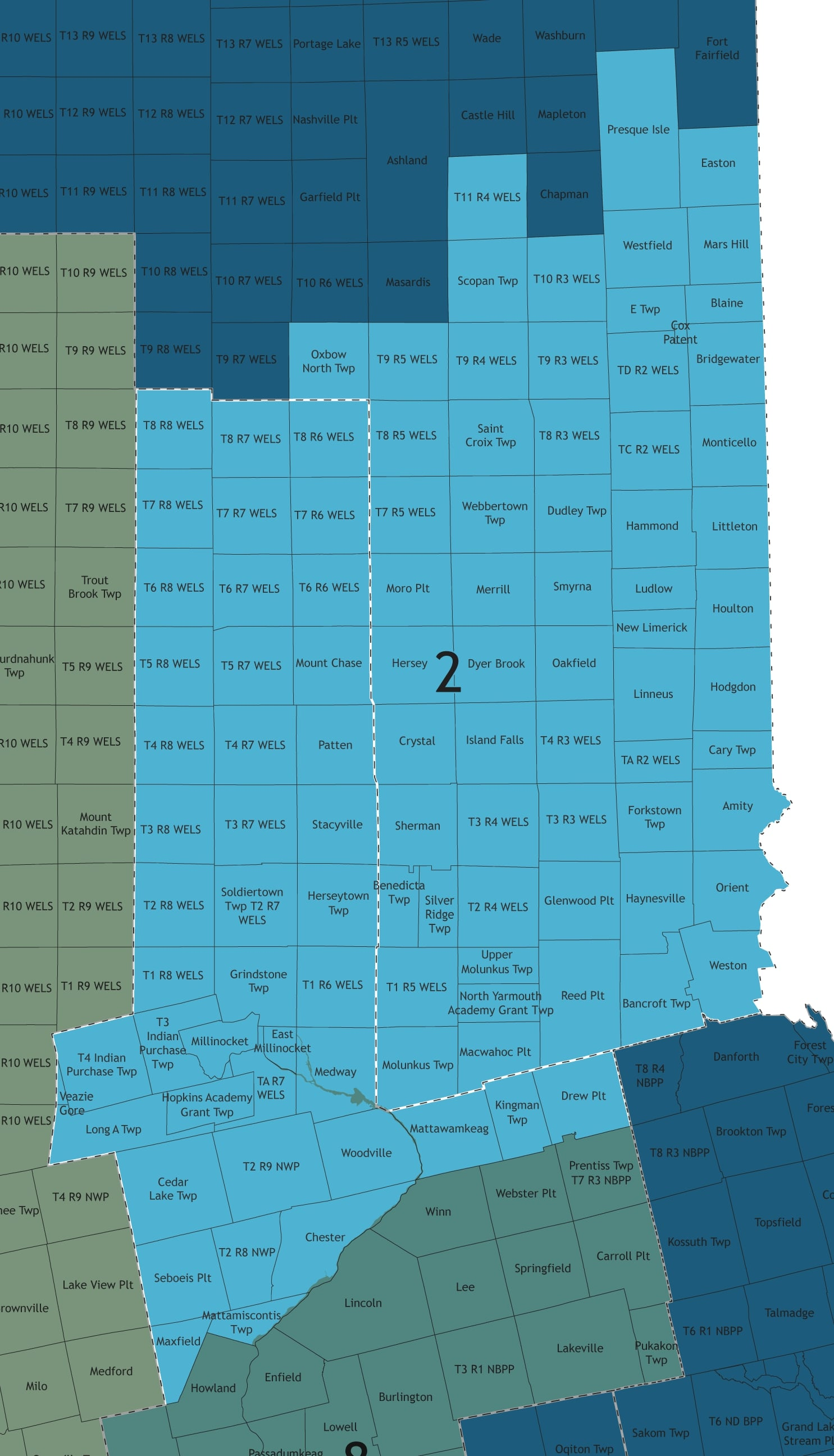
Senator
Harold Stewart; R–Aroostook
- Registration: 33.1% Republican; 16.9% Democratic; 50% No party preference
- Population (2020): 41,314

Maine's 2nd State Senate district is one of 35 districts in the Maine Senate. It has been represented by Republican Senate minority leader Harold Stewart since 2022.

== Geography ==
District 2 covers the smaller southern half of Aroostook County, and a small part of Penobscot County. It is located entirely within Maine's 2nd congressional district. It borders the Canadian province of New Brunswick.

Aroostook County - 45.1% of county Penobscot County - 6.8% of county

Aroostook:

City:

- Presque Isle

Towns:

- Amity
- Blaine
- Crystal
- Dyer Brook
- Easton
- Hammond
- Haynesville
- Hersey
- Hodgdon
- Houlton
- Island Falls
- Linneus
- Littleton
- Ludlow
- Mars Hill
- Merrill
- Monticello
- New Limerick
- Oakfield
- Orient
- Sherman
- Smyrna
- Westfield
- Weston

Penobscot:

Towns:

- Chester
- East Millnocket
- Mattawamkeag
- Maxfield
- Medway
- Millinocket
- Mount Chase
- Patten
- Stacyville
- Woodville

== Recent election results ==
=== 2022 ===
2022 Maine State Senate election, District 2
Party	Candidate	Votes	%
Republican	Harold Stewart	11,681	70
Democratic	Danielle A. Fienberg	4,997	30
Total votes		23,967	100
Republican hold			

Elections prior to 2022 were held under different district lines.

=== 2024 ===
2024 Maine State Senate election, District 2
Party	Candidate	Votes	%
Republican	Harold Stewart	13,695	66.2
Democratic	Matthew J. Rush	6,999	33.8
Total votes		20,694	100.0
Republican hold			

== Historical election results ==
=== 2012 ===
2012 Maine State Senate election, District 2
Party	Candidate	Votes	%
Republican	Ronald F. Collins	9,301	45.6
Democratic	Thomas Wright	6,377	31.2
Independent	Richard Burns	4,736	23.2
Total votes		20,414	100
Republican hold			

=== 2014 ===
2014 Maine State Senate election, District 2
Party	Candidate	Votes	%
Republican	Michael Willette (incumbent)	7,626	48.9%
Democratic	Michael E. Carpenter	7,394	47.4
Blank votes	None	587	3.8
Total votes		15,607	100
Republican hold			

=== 2016 ===
2016 Maine State Senate election, District 2
Party	Candidate	Votes	%
Democratic	Michael E. Carpenter (incumbent)	9,899	52.3
Republican	Ricky Long	9,013	47.7
Total votes		18,912	100
Democratic gain from Republican			

=== 2018 ===
2018 Maine State Senate election, District 2
Party	Candidate	Votes	%
Democratic	Michael E. Carpenter	7,433	50.7
Republican	Karen Ann Reynolds	7,226	49.3
Total votes		14,659	100
Democratic hold			

=== 2020 ===
2020 Maine State Senate election, District 2
Party	Candidate	Votes	%
Republican	Harold Stewart	10,838	56.8
Democratic	Michael E. Carpenter	7,485	43
Green	Henry John Bear (Write in)	34	0.2
Total votes		19,080	100
Republican gain from Democratic			
