= 2022 United States House of Representatives elections in Maine =

- November 8, 2022

All 2 Maine seats to the United States House of Representatives
	Majority party	Minority party
Party	Democratic	Republican
Last election	2	0
Seats won	2	0
Seat change	Steady	Steady
Popular vote	379,824	274,572
Percentage	57.99%	41.92%
Swing	▲0.04%	▼0.12%

Democratic
40–50%
50–60%
60–70%
Republican
40–50%
50–60%

The 2022 United States House of Representatives elections in Maine were held on November 8, 2022, to elect the two U.S. representatives from the state of Maine, one from each of the state's two congressional districts. The elections coincided with other elections to the House of Representatives, elections to the United States Senate and various state and local elections. The elections were conducted with ranked choice voting, as per the result of a referendum passed in 2016. These were the first House of Representatives elections held in Maine following the 2020 redistricting cycle.

== Results summary ==
=== Statewide ===
Party	Candi- dates	First round votes		Second round votes		Seats		
Party	Candi- dates	No.	%	No.	%	No.	+/–	%
Democratic Party	2	371,704	55.98%	383,766	58.24%	2	Steady	100%
Republican Party	2	270,256	40.7%	275,138	41.76%	0	Steady	0%
Independent	1	22,048	3.32%			0	Steady	0%
Total	5	664,008	100%	658,904	100%	2	Steady	100%

Popular vote
Democratic	58.24%
Republican	41.76%

House seats
Democratic	100%

=== District ===
Results of the 2022 United States House of Representatives elections in Maine by district:

District	Democratic				Republican				Others				First round total		Second round total		Result
District	First round votes	First round %	Second round votes	Second round %	First round votes	First round %	Second round votes	Second round votes %	First round votes	First round %	Second round votes	Second round %	Votes	%	Votes	%	Result
District 1	218,630	%	218,630	%	128,996	%	128,996	%	0	0%	0	0%	347,988	100.00%	347,988	100.00%	Democratic hold
District 2	153,074	48.38%	165,136	53.05%	141,260	44.65%	146,142	46.95%	22,048	6.96%	0	0%	316,382	100.00%	311,278	100.00%	Democratic hold
Total	371,704	55.98%	383,766	58.24%	270,256	40.7%	275,138	41.76%	22,048	3.32%	0	0%	664,008	100.00%	658,904	100.00%	

== District 1 ==
2022 Maine's 1st congressional district election
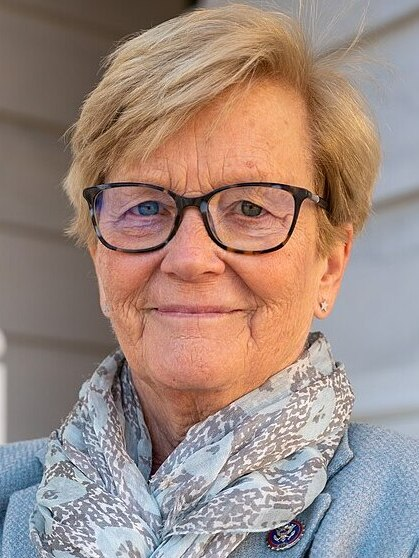

Nominee	Chellie Pingree	Ed Thelander
Party	Democratic	Republican
Popular vote	218,630	128,996
Percentage	62.9%	37.0%
- Pingree: 40–50% 50–60% 60–70% 70–80% 80–90% Thelander: 40–50% 50–60% 60–70% Tie: 50% No votes
U.S. Representative before election
Chellie Pingree
Democratic
Elected U.S. Representative
Chellie Pingree
Democratic

Before redistricting, the 1st district encompassed the southern coastal area of the state, taking in Portland, Augusta, Brunswick and Saco. The incumbent was Democrat Chellie Pingree, who was re-elected with 62.2% of the vote in 2020.

=== Democratic primary ===
==== Candidates ====
===== Nominee =====
- Chellie Pingree, incumbent U.S. Representative

==== Endorsements ====
Chellie Pingree

Organizations

- Feminist Majority PAC
- League of Conservation Voters
- Planned Parenthood Action Fund
- Sierra Club

==== Results ====
Democratic primary results
Party	Candidate	Votes	%
Democratic	Chellie Pingree (incumbent)	43,007	100.0
Total votes		43,007	100.0

=== Republican primary ===
==== Candidates ====
===== Nominee =====
- Ed Thelander, retired Navy SEAL

==== Results ====
Republican primary results
Party	Candidate	Votes	%
Republican	Ed Thelander	22,346	100.0
Total votes		22,346	100.0

=== General election ===
==== Debate ====
2022 Maine's 1st congressional district debate
No.	Date	Host	Moderator	Link	Democratic	Republican
Key: P Participant A Absent N Not invited I Invited W Withdrawn						
Key: P Participant A Absent N Not invited I Invited W Withdrawn					Chellie Pingree	Ed Thelander
1	Oct. 13, 2022	Maine Public; Broadcasting Network; Portland Press Herald			P	P

==== Predictions ====
Source	Ranking	As of
The Cook Political Report	Solid D	October 5, 2021
Inside Elections	Solid D	October 11, 2021
Sabato's Crystal Ball	Safe D	October 5, 2021
Politico	Solid D	April 5, 2022
RCP	Safe D	June 9, 2022
Fox News	Solid D	July 11, 2022
DDHQ	Solid D	July 20, 2022
538	Solid D	June 30, 2022
The Economist	Safe D	September 28, 2022

==== Polling ====
Graphical summary

Poll source	Date(s) administered	Sample size (Note: Key: A – all adults RV – registered voters LV – likely voters V – unclear)	Margin of error	Chellie Pingree (D)	Ed Thelander (R)	Other	Undecided
Pan Atlantic Research	October 7–15, 2022	400 (LV)	± 3.5%	62%	28%	–	7%
University of New Hampshire	September 15–19, 2022	351 (LV)	± 3.6%	57%	32%	–	10%
Fabrizio Ward (R)/Impact Research (D)	May 10–13, 2022	263 (LV)	± 6.0%	57%	33%	–	10%
Pan Atlantic Research	April 21 – May 5, 2022	~420 (LV)	± 4.8%	51%	31%	5%	13%

Hypothetical polling

Generic Democrat vs. generic Republican

Poll source	Date(s) administered	Sample size	Margin of error	Generic Democrat	Generic Republican	Other	Undecided
Digital Research Inc.	March 14 – April 7, 2022	311 (RV)	–	43%	26%	4% (Note: "Independent candidate" with 4%)	26%

==== Results ====
2022 Maine's 1st congressional district election
Party	Candidate	Votes	%
Democratic	Chellie Pingree (incumbent)	219,753	62.9
Republican	Ed Thelander	129,263	37.0
Write-in		160	0.0
Total votes		349,176	100
Democratic hold			

== District 2 ==
2022 Maine's 2nd congressional district election
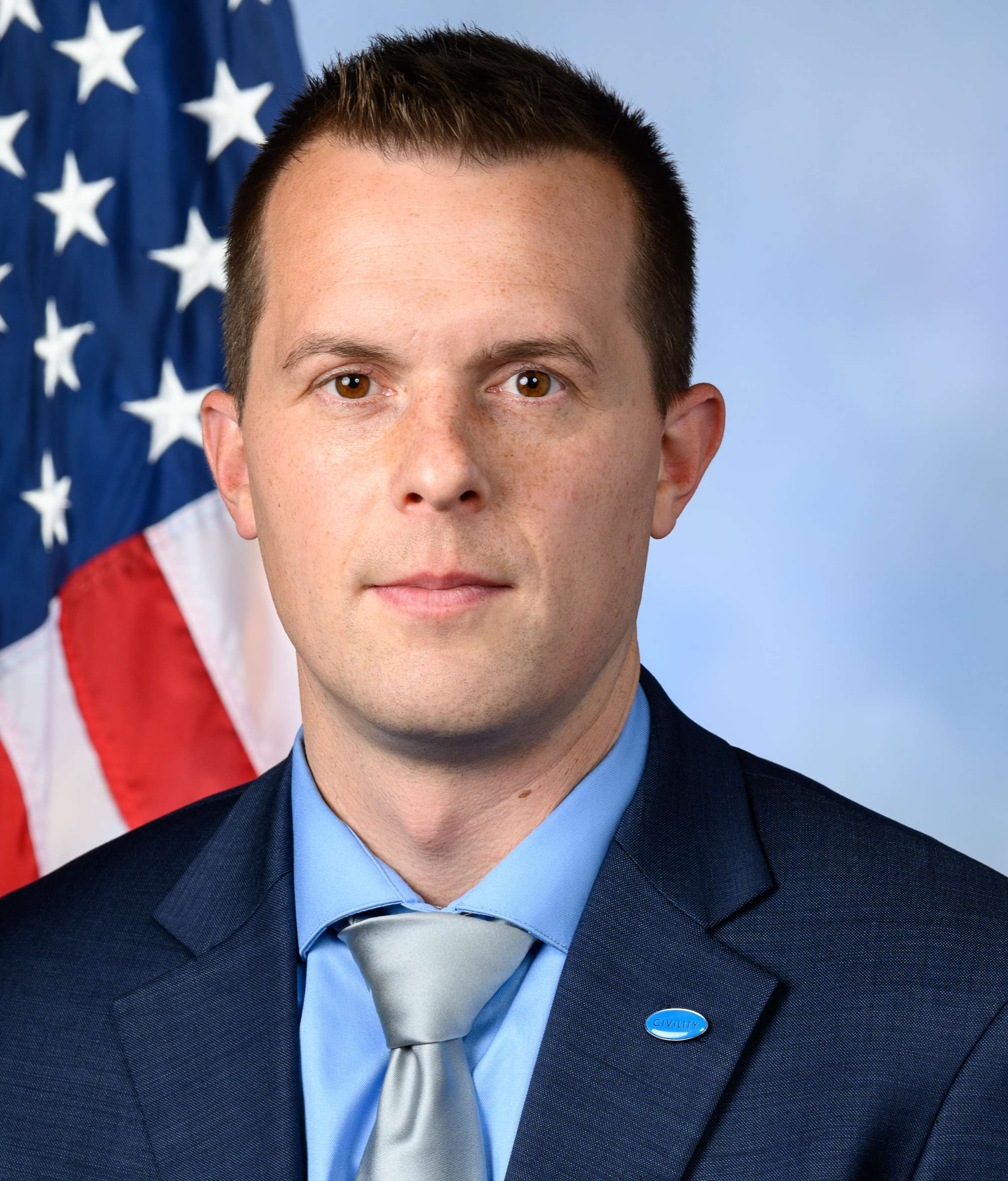

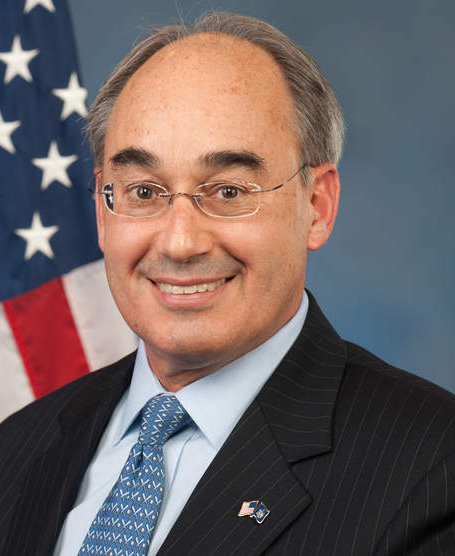

Nominee	Jared Golden	Bruce Poliquin	Tiffany Bond
Party	Democratic	Republican	Independent
First round	153,074; 48.38%	141,260; 44.65%	21,555; 6.84%
Maximum round	165,136; 53.05%	146,142; 46.95%	Eliminated
- Golden: 40–50% 50–60% 60–70% 70–80% Poliquin: 40–50% 50–60% 60–70% 70–80% 80–90% >90% Tie: 40–50% 50% No votes
U.S. Representative before election
Jared Golden
Democratic
Elected U.S. Representative
Jared Golden
Democratic

Before redistricting, the 2nd district covered most of northern rural Maine, including the cities of Lewiston, Bangor, Auburn and Presque Isle. The incumbent was Democrat Jared Golden, who was re-elected with 53.0% of the vote in 2020. Donald Trump won the district in the concurrent presidential election with 52.3% of the vote.

=== Democratic primary ===
==== Candidates ====
===== Nominee =====
- Jared Golden, incumbent U.S. Representative

===== Did not file =====
- Michael Sutton, travel agent and candidate for Maine House of Representatives in 2020

==== Endorsements ====
Jared Golden

Organizations

- American Israel Public Affairs Committee
- Democratic Majority for Israel
- End Citizens United
- Maine Fraternal Order of Police lodge
- NARAL Pro-Choice America
- New Politics
- Planned Parenthood Action Fund
- Pro-Israel America
- Renew America Movement
- VoteVets.org

==== Results ====
Democratic primary results
Party	Candidate	Votes	%
Democratic	Jared Golden (incumbent)	25,684	100.0
Total votes		25,684	100.0

=== Republican primary ===
==== Candidates ====
===== Nominee =====
- Bruce Poliquin, former U.S. Representative from Maine's 2nd congressional district

===== Eliminated in primary =====
- Elizabeth Caruso, Caratunk first selectman

===== Withdrew =====
- Mike Perkins, state representative
- Peggy Sheriff, member of the Greater Bangor Apartment Owners and Managers Association
- Trey Stewart, state senator (endorsed Poliquin)

===== Declined =====
- Dale Crafts, former state representative and nominee for this district in 2020

==== Endorsements ====
Bruce Poliquin

State legislators

- Trey Stewart, state senator

Organizations

- Congressional Leadership Fund

==== Results ====
Republican primary results
Party	Candidate	Votes	%
Republican	Bruce Poliquin	22,149	60.1
Republican	Elizabeth Caruso	14,699	39.9
Total votes		36,848	100.0

=== Independents ===
==== Candidates ====
===== Declared =====
- Tiffany Bond, family attorney, candidate for this district in 2018, and write-in candidate for U.S. Senate in 2020

===== Disqualified/withdrawn =====
- Jordan Borrowman, janitor

=== Debate ===
2022 Maine U.S. House of Representatives debate
No.	Date	Host	Moderator	Link	Democratic	Republican	Independent
Key: P Participant A Absent N Not invited I Invited W Withdrawn							
Key: P Participant A Absent N Not invited I Invited W Withdrawn					Jared Golden	Bruce Poliquin	Tiffany Bond
1	Sep. 26, 2022	Maine Public; Broadcasting Network; Portland Press Herald; Lewiston Sun Journal	Jennifer Rooks		A	A	P
2	Sep. 30, 2022	WCSH	Pat Callaghan		P	P	P

==== Predictions ====
Source	Ranking	As of
The Cook Political Report	Tossup	October 5, 2021
Inside Elections	Tilt D	October 21, 2021
Sabato's Crystal Ball	Lean D	November 7, 2022
Politico	Tossup	April 5, 2022
RCP	Tossup	June 9, 2022
Fox News	Tossup	October 11, 2022
DDHQ	Lean R (flip)	November 8, 2022
538	Lean D	September 4, 2022
The Economist	Tossup	November 1, 2022

==== Polling ====
Graphical summary

Poll source	Date(s) administered	Sample size	Margin of error	Jared Golden (D)	Bruce Poliquin (R)	Tiffany Bond (I)	Other	Undecided
SurveyUSA	October 28 – November 2, 2022	544 (LV)	± 4.9%	43%	40%	8%	–	9%
Pan Atlantic Research	October 7–15, 2022	400 (LV)	± 3.5%	47%	39%	8%	–	6%
University of New Hampshire	September 15–19, 2022	333 (LV)	± 3.6%	44%	33%	–	10%	13%
Fabrizio Ward (R)/Impact Research (D)	May 10–13, 2022	237 (LV)	± 6.4%	50%	43%	–	–	7%
Pan Atlantic Research	April 21 – May 5, 2022	~404 (LV)	± 4.9%	45%	36%	8%	2%	8%

Hypothetical polling

Generic Democrat vs. generic Republican

Poll source	Date(s) administered	Sample size	Margin of error	Generic Democrat	Generic Republican	Other	Undecided
Digital Research Inc.	March 14 – April 7, 2022	311 (RV)	–	24%	42%	7% (Note: "Independent candidate" with 7%)	28%

==== Results ====
Maine's 2nd congressional district, 2022 results
Party	Candidate	Round 1			Round 2	
Party	Candidate	Votes	%	Transfer	Votes	%
Democratic	Jared Golden (incumbent)	153,074	48.38%	+ 12,062	165,136	53.05%
Republican	Bruce Poliquin	141,260	44.65%	+ 4,882	146,142	46.95%
Independent	Tiffany Bond	21,655	6.84%	21,655	Eliminated	
Write-in		393	0.12%	393	Eliminated	
Continuing ballots		316,382	100%		311,278	98.39%
Exhausted ballots		-		+ 5,104	5,104	1.61%
Total votes		316,382	100%		316,382	
Democratic hold						

== See also ==
- 2022 Maine elections

== Notes ==
Partisan clients
