= Andrew Ketterer =

American lawyer and politician

Maine Attorney General
- In office 1995–2001
- Governor: Angus King
- Preceded by: Michael E. Carpenter
- Succeeded by: G. Steven Rowe

Member of the Maine House of Representatives Seat 102
- In office 1990–1994
- Preceded by: Alexander Richard
- Succeeded by: June C. Meres

Personal details
- Born: January 17, 1949 (age 77)
- Party: Democrat
- Spouse: Susanne Ketterer
- Occupation: Attorney

Andrew "Drew" Ketterer (born January 17, 1949) is an American lawyer and politician from Maine. Ketterer, a Democrat, serve two terms (1990–1994) in the Maine House of Representatives from Norridgewock, Maine. After declining to see a third term in 1994, Ketterer was elected by the Democratic majority of the Maine Legislature to be Maine Attorney General, succeeding fellow Democrat Michael E. Carpenter. He served three terms (1995–2001) as Attorney General. While in office, he made civil rights enforcement a priority of his office as well as fighting fraud and elder abuse. He was replaced by Speaker of the Maine House of Representatives G. Steven Rowe.

In July 2000, Ketterer was elected president of the National Association of Attorneys General. In that same month, the Portland Phoenix called Ketterer "the second most powerful man in Maine government next to the governor."

His wife, Susanne Ketterer, served a term (2002–2004) in the Maine House of Representatives as well.

Legal offices
Preceded by Michael E. Carpenter	Maine Attorney General; 1995–2001	Succeeded by G. Steven Rowe
