= Robert Saucier =

American politician

Robert J. Saucier
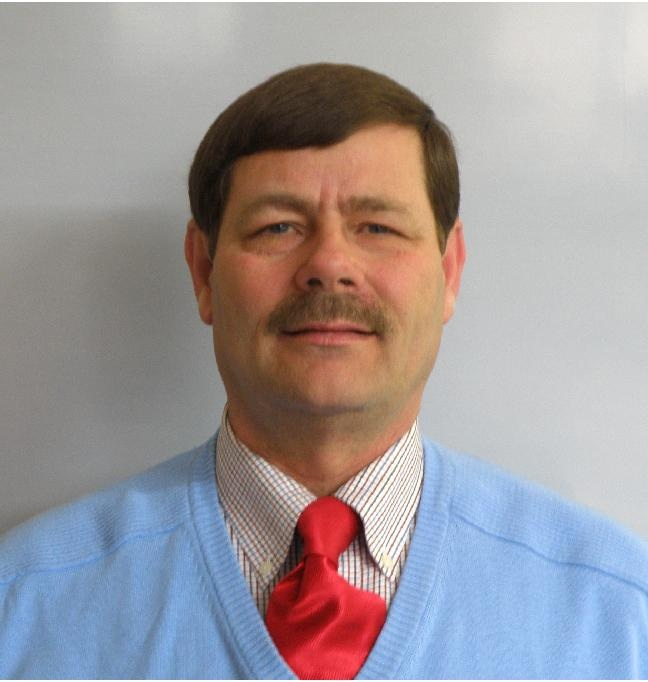

Member of the Maine House of Representatives from the 147th District
- In office December 2012 – December 2016
- Succeeded by: Trey Stewart

Personal details
- Born: March 10, 1955 (age 71)
- Party: Democratic
- Education: Northern Maine Vocational Technical Institute; University of Southern Maine

Robert Joseph Saucier (born March 10, 1955) is an American politician. He is a former member of the Maine House of Representatives for Presque Isle, ME, House District 147 of the 127th Maine Legislature. During his first two terms in office, Saucier served on both the Agriculture, Conservation and Forestry Committee and the Veterans and Legal Affairs Committee.

== Political career ==
A Democrat, Saucier was first elected to represent House District 5 in November 2012, defeating Republican incumbent Michael Willette by a margin of 3% (1,933 to 1,821 votes). He was re-elected to his second term in November, 2014 to the renamed House District 147.

== Personal ==
Saucier is a veteran of the USAF, retired Captain (United States O-3) of the Army National Guard (ARNG), and retired civil service member of the United States Government.

Saucier is a graduate of the Northern Maine Vocational Technical Institute (now Northern Maine Community College) and the University of Southern Maine. Saucier currently resides in Presque Isle, ME with his wife, Anna Marie.
