= Michael E. Carpenter =

American lawyer and politician

Member of the Maine Senate
- In office 2016 – December 2, 2020
- Preceded by: Michael Willette
- Succeeded by: Trey Stewart
- Constituency: 2nd district
- In office 1976–1986
- Constituency: Southern Aroostook County

52nd Maine Attorney General
- In office 1991–1995
- Governor: John R. McKernan, Jr.
- Preceded by: James Tierney
- Succeeded by: Andrew Ketterer

Member of the Maine House of Representatives from the 19th district
- In office 1974–1976

Personal details
- Born: September 3, 1947 (age 79)
- Party: Democratic
- Education: University of Maine School of Law
- Occupation: Attorney

Michael E. Carpenter (born September 3, 1947) is an American lawyer and politician from Maine. Carpenter, a Democrat, served one term (1974–1976) in the Maine House of Representatives from Houlton. In 1976, Carpenter was elected to the Maine Senate, representing southern Aroostook County. He served in that office until 1986. In 1991, the Maine Legislature elected Carpenter to the position of Maine Attorney General. He served in that office until 1995, when he was replaced by fellow Democrat Andrew Ketterer.

Carpenter is a graduate of the University of Maine School of Law.

In November 2014, Carpenter sought election to the Maine Senate to replace term-limited Republican Roger Sherman. He was defeated by former State Representative Michael Willette in the general election.

In November 2016, Carpenter again sought election to the Maine Senate (District 2). He ran against incumbent Ricky Long and won in the general election. Carpenter was re-elected in 2018, but was defeated by Republican Trey Stewart in 2020.

== Electoral history ==
Maine House of Representatives 19th District general election, 1974
Party	Candidate	Votes	%
Democratic	Michael E. Carpenter	1,251	58.13%
Republican	Roy A. Bither, Jr.	901	41.87%
Total votes		19,358	100%
Democratic hold			

Maine Senate District 2 general election, 2014
Party	Candidate	Votes	%
Republican	Michael Willette	7,626	50.77%
Democratic	Michael E. Carpenter	7,394	49.23%
Total votes		15,020	100.0%
Republican hold			

Maine State Senate 2nd District general election, 2016
Party	Candidate	Votes	%
Democratic	Michael Carpenter	9,899	52.34%
Republican	Ricky Long	9,013	47.66%
Total votes		18,912	100%
Democratic gain from Republican			

Maine Senate district 2 general election, 2018
Party	Candidate	Votes	%
Democratic	Michael Carpenter (incumbent)	7,433	50.71%
Republican	Karen Ann Reynolds	7,226	49.29%
Total votes		14,659	100.0
Democratic hold			

2020 Maine State Senate election, District 2
Party	Candidate	Votes	%
Republican	Harold "Trey" Stewart	10,838	56.90
Democratic	Michael E Carpenter (incumbent)	8,208	43.10
Total votes		19,705	100.00
Republican gain from Democratic			

Legal offices
Preceded by James E. Tierney	Maine Attorney General; 1991–1995	Succeeded by Andrew Ketterer
