= Caratunk, Maine =

- Town
- Logo

- Location within Maine Location within the United States
- Coordinates: 45°14′30″N 69°55′24″W
- Country: United States
- State: Maine
- County: Somerset
- Incorporated: October 14, 1977

Area
  - Total: 55.27 sq mi (143.15 km^{2})
  - Land: 52.30 sq mi (135.46 km^{2})
  - Water: 2.97 sq mi (7.69 km^{2})
- Elevation: 1,910 ft (580 m)

Population (2020)
  - Total: 81
  - Density: 1.6/sq mi (0.6/km^{2})
- Time zone: UTC-5 (Eastern (EST))
  - Summer (DST): UTC-4 (EDT)
- ZIP code: 04925
- Area code: 207
- FIPS code: 23-10495
- GNIS feature ID: 582388
- Website: caratunkmaine.gov

Caratunk is a town in Somerset County, Maine, United States. The population was 81 at the 2020 census.

== Geography ==
According to the United States Census Bureau, the town has a total area of 55.27 square miles (143.15 km^{2}), of which 52.30 square miles (135.46 km^{2}) is land and 2.97 square miles (7.69 km^{2}) is water.

=== Pleasant Pond ===
Pleasant Pond
- Location within Maine
- Location: Somerset County, Maine
- Coordinates: 45°15′N 69°55′W
- Primary outflows: Pleasant Pond Stream
- Basin countries: United States
- Max. length: 1.9 mi (3.1 km)
- Max. width: 1.9 mi (3.1 km)
- Surface area: 1,037 acres (420 ha)
- Max. depth: 198 feet (60 m)
- Water volume: 77,993 acre⋅ft (96,203,000 m^{3})
- Surface elevation: 1,266 ft (386 m)

Pleasant Pond is the largest lake in Caratunk. Pleasant Pond Stream overflows a dam in the southwestern corner of the pond, and flows 3 miles (4.8 km) west into the Kennebec River at Caratunk village. The Appalachian Trail passes through Caratunk following Pleasant Pond Stream and the northwestern shore of Pleasant Pond before climbing Pleasant Pond Mountain. Pleasant Pond supports a population of lake trout and brook trout.

== Demographics ==
Historical population
| Census | Pop. | Note | %± |
|---|---|---|---|
| 1850 | 47 | | — |
| 1870 | 214 | | — |
| 1880 | 173 | | −19.2% |
| 1890 | 192 | | 11.0% |
| 1900 | 218 | | 13.5% |
| 1910 | 235 | | 7.8% |
| 1920 | 193 | | −17.9% |
| 1930 | 169 | | −12.4% |
| 1940 | 133 | | −21.3% |
| 1950 | 96 | | −27.8% |
| 1960 | 90 | | −6.2% |
| 1970 | 96 | | 6.7% |
| 1980 | 84 | | −12.5% |
| 1990 | 98 | | 16.7% |
| 2000 | 108 | | 10.2% |
| 2010 | 69 | | −36.1% |
| 2020 | 81 | | 17.4% |
U.S. Decennial Census

=== 2010 census ===
As of the census of 2010, there were 69 people, 41 households, and 20 families living in the town. The population density was 1.3 inhabitants per square mile (0.5/km^{2}). There were 221 housing units at an average density of 4.2 per square mile (1.6/km^{2}). The racial makeup of the town was 97.1% White, 1.4% Native American, and 1.4% from two or more races.

There were 41 households, of which 7.3% had children under the age of 18 living with them, 48.8% were married couples living together, and 51.2% were non-families. 43.9% of all households were made up of individuals, and 17% had someone living alone who was 65 years of age or older. The average household size was 1.68 and the average family size was 2.25.

The median age in the town was 55.1 years. 5.8% of residents were under the age of 18; 1.3% were between the ages of 18 and 24; 21.7% were from 25 to 44; 49.2% were from 45 to 64; and 21.7% were 65 years of age or older. The gender makeup of the town was 53.6% male and 46.4% female.

=== 2000 census ===
As of the census of 2000, there were 108 people, 42 households, and 28 families living in the town. The population density was 2.1 people per square mile (0.81 people/km^{2}). There were 202 housing units at an average density of 3.9 per square mile (1.5/km^{2}). The racial makeup of the town was 100.00% White.

There were 42 households, out of which 33.3% had children under the age of 18 living with them, 66.7% were married couples living together, and 33.3% were non-families. 23.8% of all households were made up of individuals, and 9.5% had someone living alone who was 65 years of age or older. The average household size was 2.57 and the average family size was 3.14.

In the town, the population was spread out, with 24.1% under the age of 18, 5.6% from 18 to 24, 35.2% from 25 to 44, 19.4% from 45 to 64, and 15.7% who were 65 years of age or older. The median age was 40 years. For every 100 females there were 111.8 males. For every 100 females age 18 and over, there were 110.3 males.

The median income for a household in the town was $36,591, and the median income for a family was $36,875. Males had a median income of $32,083 versus $18,125 for females. The per capita income for the town was $17,321. There were no families and 4.8% of the population living below the poverty line, including no under eighteen and 10.0% of those over 64.

== Notable person ==
- Elizabeth Caruso: First Selectwoman of Caratunk, contender for the Republican nomination in Maine's 2022 U.S. House election.
