= Jared Golden =

American politician and veteran (born 1982)

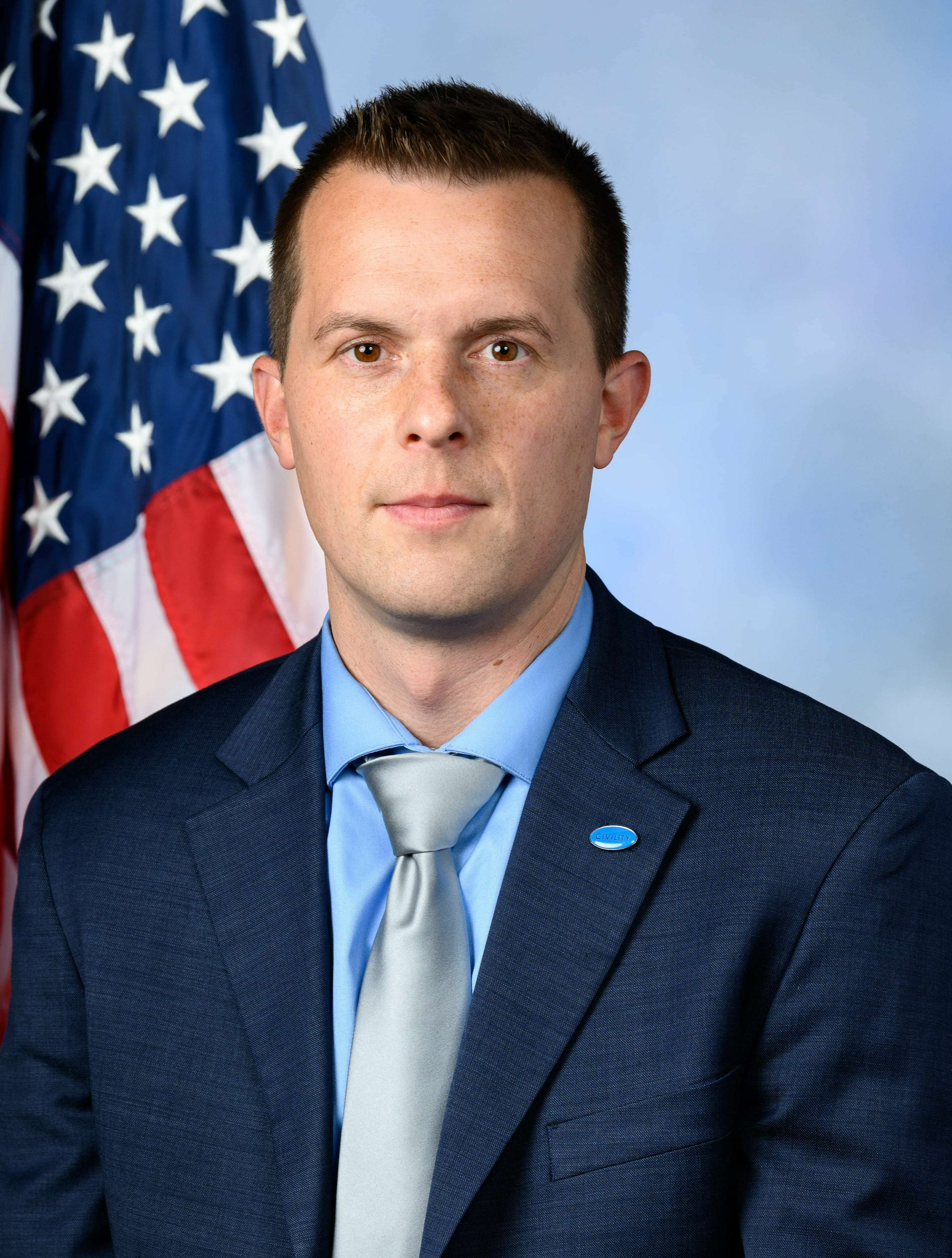
- Official portrait, 2020

Co-Chair of the Blue Dog Coalition for Administration
- In office January 3, 2023 – January 3, 2025
- Preceded by: Stephanie Murphy
- Succeeded by: Marie Gluesenkamp Perez

Member of the U.S. House of Representatives from Maine's 2nd district
- Incumbent
- Assumed office January 3, 2019
- Preceded by: Bruce Poliquin

Member of the Maine House of Representatives from the 60th district
- In office December 3, 2014 – December 5, 2018
- Preceded by: Nate Libby
- Succeeded by: Kristen Cloutier

Personal details
- Born: Jared Forrest Golden; July 25, 1982 (age 44) Lewiston, Maine, U.S.
- Party: Democratic
- Spouse: Isobel Moiles (m. 2015)
- Children: 2
- Education: University of Maine, Farmington (attended); Bates College (BA)
- Website: House website

Military service
- Branch/service: United States Marine Corps
- Years of service: 2002–2006
- Rank: Corporal
- Unit: 3rd Battalion, 6th Marines
- Battles/wars: War in Afghanistan; Second Gulf War
- Awards: Navy and Marine Corps Achievement Medal

Jared Forrest Golden (born July 25, 1982) is an American politician and Marine Corps veteran serving as the U.S. representative for Maine's 2nd congressional district since 2019. A Democrat, he represents a district encompassing the northern four-fifths of the state, including the cities of Lewiston, Bangor, and Auburn, along with the state capital of Augusta. It is the largest district east of the Mississippi River. His district was carried by Donald Trump in both the 2020 and 2024 presidential elections, making it a politically competitive area. Golden concurrently won his district both times.

Golden was deployed to Iraq and Afghanistan as a United States Marine. He was awarded the Navy and Marine Corps Achievement Medal for his performance during Operation Steel Curtain in the Iraq War.

Golden, along with Angus King and Chellie Pingree, were the first members of Congress to be elected by ranked-choice voting. He is the only representative to win after initially placing second in the first round of tabulation.

A self-described progressive conservative, Golden previously served as a co-chair of the Blue Dog Coalition. On November 5, 2025, Golden announced he would not seek re-election in 2026.

== Early life and education ==
Jared Forrest Golden was born on July 25, 1982, in Lewiston, Maine to Joseph Forrest "Joe" Golden and his wife Jeannine (nee Hamel), and was raised in the nearby town of Leeds. He attended Leavitt Area High School in the town of Turner, Maine, competed on the school's baseball, soccer, football, and basketball teams, and graduated in 2001. He then attended the University of Maine at Farmington, intending to become a history teacher.

== Military career ==
Golden was awarded the Navy and Marine Corps Achievement Medal for his performance during Operation Steel Curtain

Following the September 11 attacks on the United States, however, Golden left college and enlisted in the U.S. Marines. He was assigned to Kilo Company of the 3rd Battalion of the 6th Marines, an infantry unit based out of Marine Corps Base Camp Lejeune in North Carolina.

In the spring of 2004, Golden deployed to the Kunar Province of eastern Afghanistan along the Afghanistan–Pakistan border in the Hindu Kush mountain range. Stationed at a remote mountaintop outpost, his small team provided security and overwatch for a detachment of Green Berets engaged in counter-terrorism operations. During this tour, his unit survived the detonation of a roadside improvised explosive device (IED) on their truck on the day of Afghanistan's first presidential election.

He deployed for a second combat tour from late 2005 to early 2006, serving in the Al Anbar Province of Iraq. During this tour, he participated in Operation Steel Curtain in 2005, a major joint offensive targeting foreign fighters and insurgent networks along the Euphrates River near the Syrian border. Golden rose to the rank of corporal, and was awarded the Navy and Marine Corps Achievement Medal for his performance during the operation. He completed his active duty enlistment and was honorably discharged in December 2006. He later served a brief stint in the United States Marine Corps Reserve from May 2008 to April 2009.

== Return to Maine, and further education ==
Upon returning to Maine, Golden earned a degree in history and politics from Bates College in Lewiston. While he was completing his degree at Bates, he returned to Afghanistan during his summer semester to work as a volunteer school teacher.

== Early career ==
Following his college graduation, he worked as an international representative for Paxton International, an international logistics firm, from January to August 2011. In his position with the firm, he deployed back to the Middle East to manage logistics operations on-site in Iraq and Afghanistan.

In September 2011, he joined the staff of Maine Republican senator Susan Collins, working as a professional staff member for the Republican minority on the United States Senate Committee on Homeland Security and Governmental Affairs until January 2013. He subsequently transitioned directly into Senator Collins's personal office, serving as a legislative assistant from January 2013 to August 2013, before returning to Maine to work for the state legislature.

== Maine House of Representatives ==
In 2013, Golden returned to Maine. He worked as a legislative aide for the House Democratic Office in the Maine Legislature.

In 2014, as a Democrat he campaigned for a seat in the Maine House of Representatives and won the election to represent House District 60, which encompassed a significant portion of his resident city of Lewiston.

Golden was reelected to the Maine House of Representatives in 2016. In the subsequent legislative session, he was selected to be the Assistant House Majority Leader. Golden also chaired the Elections Committee and the Joint Select Committee on Joint Rules.

== U.S. House of Representatives ==
=== Elections ===
==== 2018 ====
On August 24, 2017, Golden announced his candidacy to challenge incumbent Republican Representative Bruce Poliquin to serve in the United States House of Representatives for Maine's 2nd congressional district. On June 20, 2018, he was declared the winner of the Democratic primary, defeating environmentalist Lucas St. Clair and bookstore owner Craig Olson.

On election night, Golden initially trailed Poliquin by 2,000 votes. Because no candidate won a majority of first-place votes, Maine's newly implemented ranked-choice voting system called for the votes initially for independents Tiffany Bond and William Hoar to be redistributed to Poliquin or Golden in accordance with their voters' second choice. The independents' supporters ranked Golden as their second choice by an overwhelming margin, allowing him to defeat Poliquin by a margin of 3,000 votes after the final tabulation. He was the first challenger to unseat an incumbent in the district since 1916.

Poliquin then contested the legitimacy of the use of ranked-choice voting in the election, and claimed that he was the rightful winner because of his first-round plurality lead. He filed a lawsuit in federal court asking the court to declare ranked-choice voting to be unconstitutional, and asking the court to declare him to be the winner. Chief U.S. district judge of the U.S. District Court for the District of Maine Lance E. Walker rejected all of Poliquin's arguments, and upheld the certified results. Poliquin then appealed to the U.S. Court of Appeals for the First Circuit, and asked the court to issue an emergency injunction that would prevent Golden from being certified as the winner. His request was denied. On December 24, Poliquin dropped his lawsuit, clearing the path for Golden to be seated in the 116th United States Congress.

==== 2020 ====
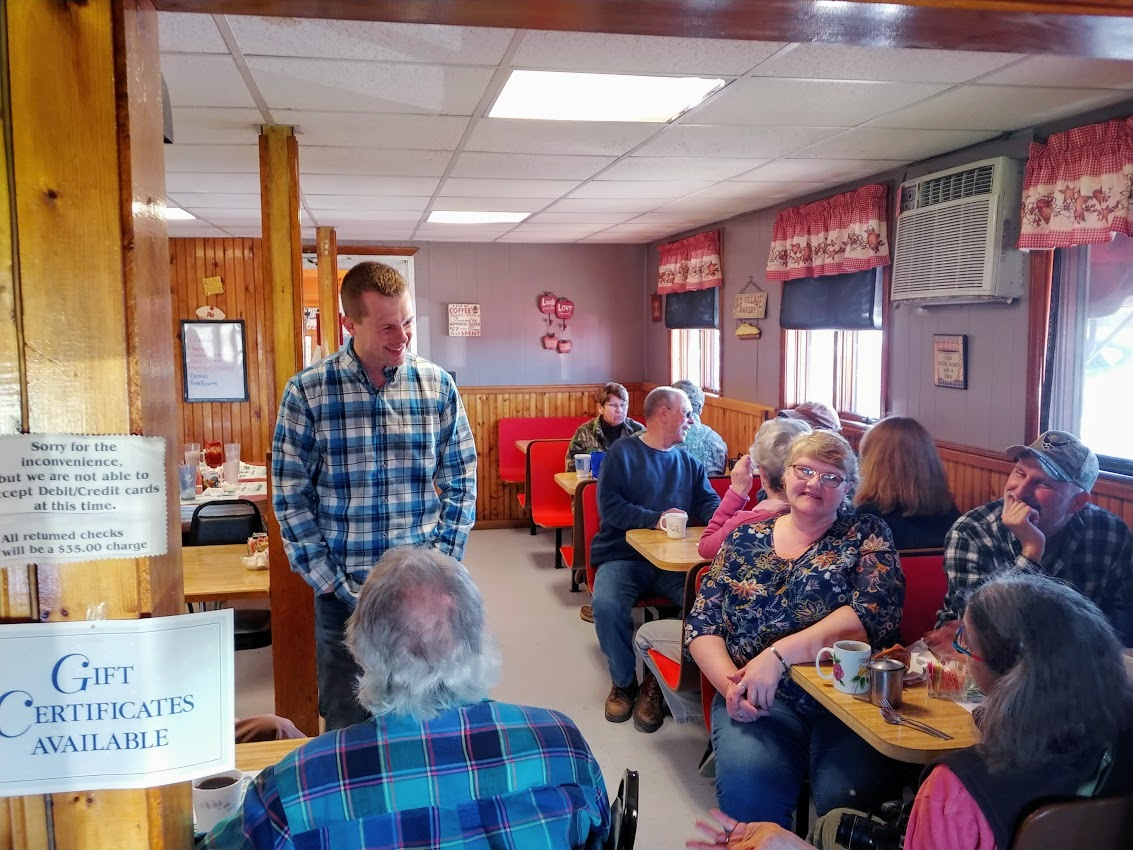
Golden visits a diner and meets constituents in his district.

Golden ran for reelection in 2020 and won the Democratic primary unopposed. His Republican opponent was Dale Crafts, a former Maine representative. Most political pundits expected Golden to win the general election easily; polling showed him ahead of Crafts by an average of about 19%, Sabato's Crystal Ball and The Cook Political Report both rating the contest as "Likely Democratic", and analysis website FiveThirtyEight predicted that Golden had a 96 out of 100 chance of winning, with Golden garnering nearly 57% of the vote in their projection of the most likely scenario.

In November, Golden defeated Crafts 53%–47%. President Donald Trump carried the district in that same election.

==== 2022 ====
Golden ran for reelection in 2022 and won the Democratic primary unopposed. Redistricting pushed the 2nd further into Kennebec County. Notably, he picked up Augusta, which had long been part of the 1st district.

Golden faced former Republican congressman Bruce Poliquin, whom he narrowly beat in 2018, and independent Tiffany Bond, who also ran for the 2nd congressional district seat in 2018. In July, Golden was endorsed by the Fraternal Order of Police, Maine's largest police union, which "split the ticket" by also endorsing former Republican governor Paul LePage. Polls again showed Golden with a lead, but many organizations rated the seat as a "tossup", as incumbent president Joe Biden was unpopular and inflation was approaching 40-year highs; Decision Desk HQ even gave the seat a "Leans Republican" rating. Nonetheless, Golden led the field in the first round, and defeated Poliquin 53%–47% after Bond's second-choice votes mostly flowed to him.

==== 2024 ====
Golden won a fourth term in Congress. He very narrowly defeated Republican state Representative Austin Theriault, who was endorsed by Donald Trump.

Golden's district was again concurrently carried by Trump in the 2024 United States presidential election in Maine.

=== Tenure ===
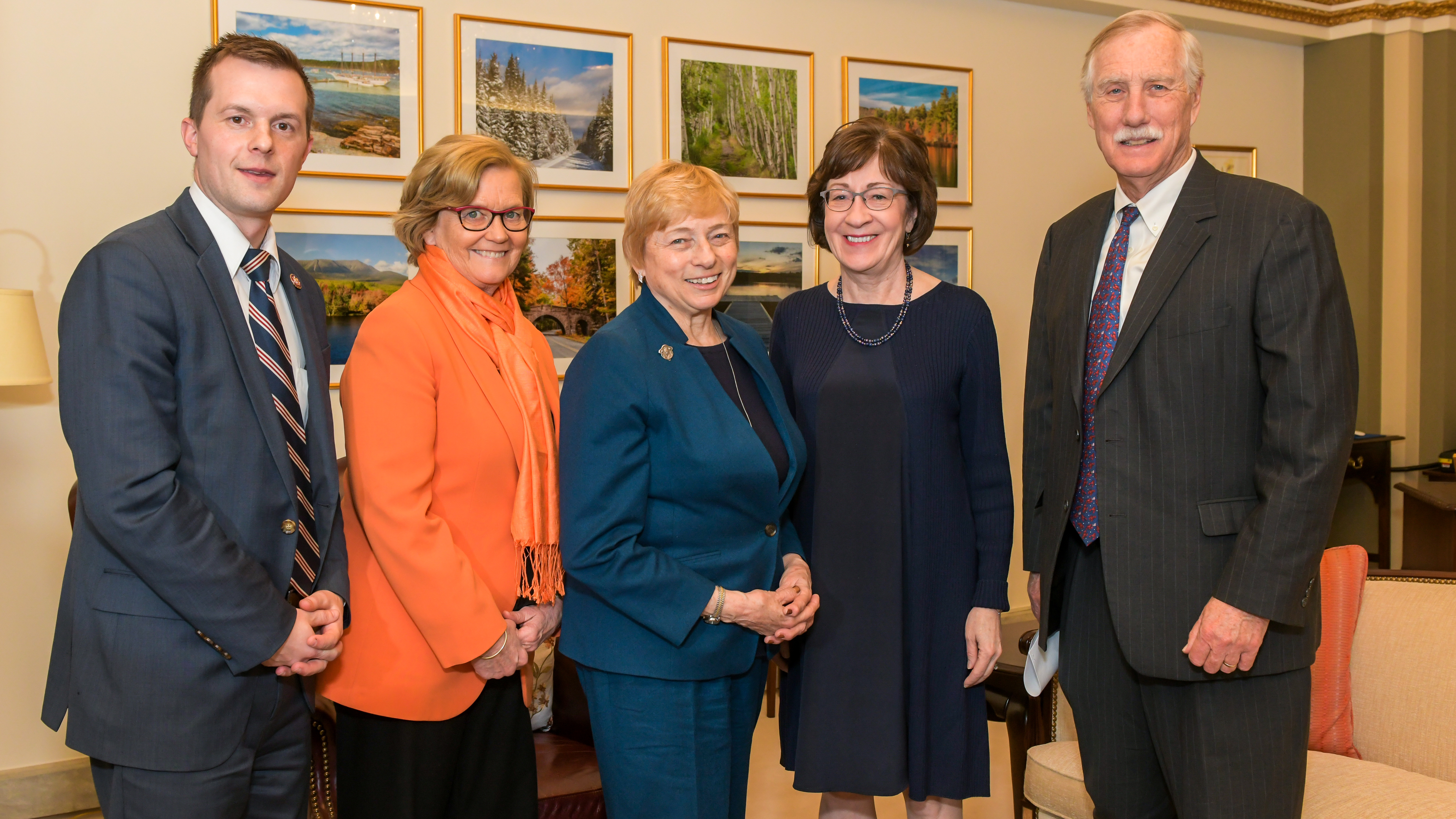
Left to right: Maine's Congress members Golden and Chellie Pingree, Maine's Governor Janet Mills, Maine's US Senators Susan Collins and Angus King in 2019 during Golden's first two months in Congress

Golden was sworn in on January 3, 2019. During the election for speaker of the House, he voted against Democratic Caucus nominee Nancy Pelosi, as he had pledged to do during his campaign, instead casting his vote for Representative Cheri Bustos of Illinois. Golden voted in 2019 for Article I of the articles of impeachment against Donald Trump but was one of three Democrats to vote against Article II.

Golden endorsed Senator Michael Bennet of Colorado during the 2020 Democratic Party presidential primaries.

Golden represents the second-most rural district in the United States, with 72% of its population living in rural areas. The district also has the second-highest proportion of non-Hispanic White residents (94%). Only Kentucky's 5th congressional district exceeds it in the two categories. Additionally, his district was carried by Donald Trump in 2020, the only district in New England to do so.

On November 5, 2025, Golden, stating that he had "grown tired of the increasing incivility and plain nastiness" of contemporary politics, announced he would not seek re-election in the 2026 election.

=== Committee assignments ===
For the 119th Congress:

- Committee on Armed Services
  - Subcommittee on Intelligence and Special Operations
  - Subcommittee on Seapower and Projection Forces
- Committee on Natural Resources
  - Subcommittee on Energy and Mineral Resources
  - Subcommittee on Federal Lands
  - Subcommittee on Water, Wildlife and Fisheries

=== Caucus memberships ===
- Blue Dog Coalition
- Congressional Equality Caucus
- For Country Caucus (co-chair)
- Problem Solvers Caucus

== Political positions ==
Golden is a moderate or conservative Blue Dog Democrat. He has advocated what he calls "progressive conservatism" and was described as an "obstinate independent" by Axios. Golden stated in 2024 that he had not attended a Democratic caucus meeting since October 2021, which his spokesperson explained by saying that it's because he is "the most independent member of his party in the House" so he "has little need" to attend those meetings.

=== Economics ===
Golden was the only Democrat to have voted for a 2025 Republican stopgap spending bill to avert a government shutdown, voting against the instructions of House Democratic leadership.

==== Infrastructure ====
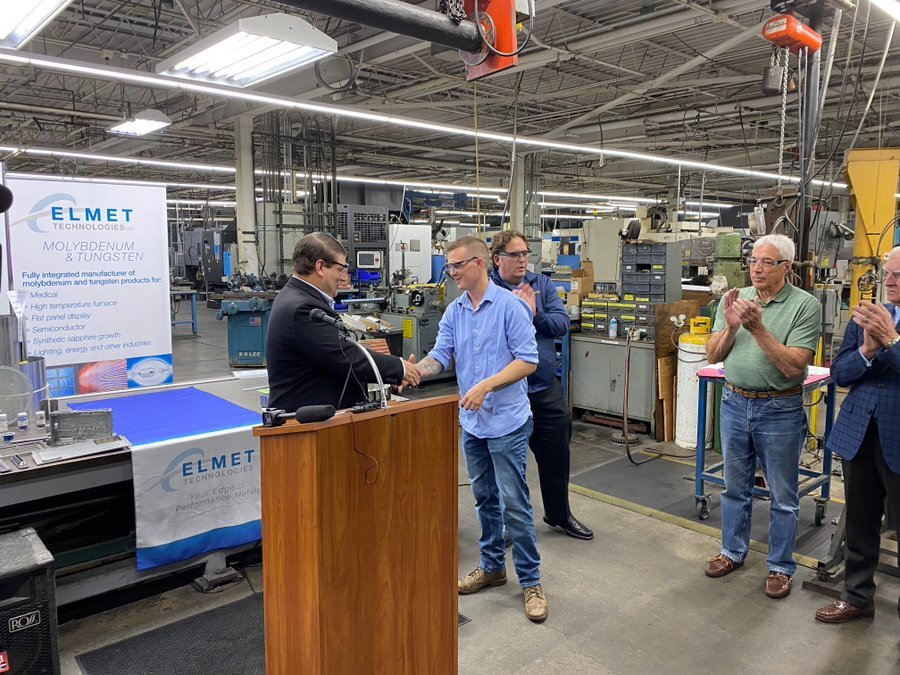
Golden at Elmet Technologies promoting manufacturing and infrastructure in Maine

In November 2021, Golden was the only House Democrat to vote with Republicans against the Build Back Better Act. He cited concerns about the proposed elimination of the $10,000 cap on the state and local tax (SALT) deduction, characterizing the provision as a "tax break for millionaires", while also criticizing the bill's lack of comprehensive prescription drug pricing reform.

However, in August 2022 he joined Democrats to vote for the Inflation Reduction Act, an amended version of the original bill that excluded the SALT deduction provision and incorporated provisions allowing Medicare to negotiate prescription drug prices.

==== Trade ====
Golden was one of 38 Democrats to vote against the United States–Mexico–Canada Agreement Implementation Act. He expressed concern that the law's labeling requirements would not prevent international companies from misbranding products, potentially harming Maine businesses. Golden also voiced skepticism about enforcement, citing America's perceived poor track record with previous trade agreements in protecting workers.

In 2025, Golden was one of the only Democrats in Congress to openly support President Donald Trump's tariff policy. He criticized his party's perceived shift toward defending free trade deals and the stock market and "coming out strongly" against Trump's tariffs, advocating instead for a populist approach of "progressive conservatism". Golden expressed concern over Trump backing down from his tariff policy, telling Axios, "My biggest worry is that they're going to do this and lose faith and political will and back away." He opposed Democratic Representative Gregory Meeks' measure in the house to "kill Trump's tariffs".

In January 2025, Golden introduced legislation that would put a universal 10% tariff on all imports into the U.S. His stance put him at odds with House Democrats. Golden also dismissed the 2025 stock market crash that followed President Trump's tariffs saying, "The vast majority of Americans have no stocks."

=== Education ===
Golden was one of two House Democrats (the other being Representative Marie Gluesenkamp Perez of Washington) to side with Republicans in voting to overturn President Joe Biden's student loan debt cancellation plan of 2023 under the HEROES Act. Golden defended his vote by arguing that broad debt forgiveness unfairly burdened working-class taxpayers who did not attend college or who had already paid off their student debt, characterizing the executive policy as a regressive redistribution of wealth. After the Supreme Court's struck down the primary program in Biden v. Nebraska in 2023, Golden voted again with a bipartisan coalition on February 7, 2024, in favor of a Congressional Review Act resolution to block the administration's subsequent income-driven repayment adjustment plan.

=== Foreign policy ===
==== Iran ====
With regard to Iran and the hostilities that broke out with it on February 28, 2026, Golden initially opposed legislative efforts to limit U.S. executive military authority. On March 5, 2026, he bucked the majority of his party to vote against a proposed War Powers resolution that would have forced an immediate withdrawal of forces, arguing that an abrupt exit while service members were actively engaged would destabilize the region and weaken the United States' positioning. On April 16, 2026, Golden was the lone Democrat to side with House Republicans to narrowly defeat a subsequent proposed War Powers resolution by a 213–214 vote, stating that maintaining military presence was necessary to protect the U.S. negotiating position during active ceasefire discussions.

However, after the statutory 60-day window under the War Powers Act of 1973 expired on May 1 without the administration securing congressional approval, Golden shifted his position. On June 3, 2026, Golden voted in favor of House Concurrent Resolution 86, a bipartisan 215–208 measure to remove United States forces from unauthorized hostilities against Iran, stating that while the executive branch legally retained unilateral authority for the first 60 days of the conflict, continued military engagement and naval blockades could not legally persist without explicit congressional approval.

==== Israel-Palestine ====
Following the October 7 attacks by Hamas on Israel, Golden strongly condemned Hamas, calling for the group's dismantling and the return of the hostages that Hamas had taken to the Gaza Strip, while rejecting arguments of equal blame between Israel and Hamas, Hezbollah, and Iran. In May 2024, he criticized President Biden for withholding military aid from Israel, arguing that it showed weakness and disputing accusations that Israel was committing war crimes. Following a January 2025 Gaza war ceasefire, he said that lasting peace requires Hamas to "lay down the weapons". During the Gaza war, Golden opposed calls for a ceasefire. He voted in favor of providing $14.3 billion in additional funding to support Israeli military operations in the Gaza Strip at the start of the war.

==== Ukraine ====
Following the 2022 Russian invasion of Ukraine, Golden has been a consistent supporter of military and financial assistance to Ukraine. He says that the defense of Ukrainian sovereignty is a vital U.S. national security interest. He voted for major aid packages to Ukraine, arguing that opposing Russian expansion is necessary for security.

In 2024, Golden partnered with Pennsylvania Republican Representative Brian Fitzpatrick to introduce the Defending Borders, Defending Democracies Act, a bipartisan proposal linking aid to border security. On April 20, 2024, he voted for H.R. 8035, the Ukraine Security Supplemental Appropriations Act. On June 4, 2026, he voted for the Ukraine Support Act, supporting continued military aid and loans to counter Russian action.

During the Russo-Ukrainian War, Golden organized a letter signed by several members of Congress, urging Biden to send F-16 fighter jets to Ukraine.

=== Health ===
==== Abortion ====
Golden has maintained a consistent voting record supporting abortion rights. He has a 100% rating from Reproductive Freedom for All (formerly NARAL Pro-Choice America), and an F grade from the anti-abortion Susan B. Anthony List, for his abortion-related voting history.

==== COVID-19 pandemic ====
Golden in January 2023, during the COVID-19 pandemic in the United States, was one of seven Democrats to vote with Republicans in favor of H.R.497, the Freedom for Health Care Workers Act, which sought to lift U.S. COVID-19 vaccine mandates for healthcare workers participating in Medicare and Medicaid programs. A day later, he was among 12 Democrats who joined Republicans in supporting a resolution to immediately terminate the COVID-19 national emergency first declared in March 2020.

=== Immigration ===
Golden has frequently broken with his party on immigration policy, voting against certain pathways to legal residency and supporting funding for border enforcement, while at the same time supporting the retention of protections for DACA recipients. In 2021, Golden was the sole House Democrat to oppose the Farm Workforce Modernization Act, supported by 30 Republicans, which would have allowed over one million undocumented farm workers to apply for legal residency status. Golden explained his vote alongside state leaders by saying that the bill adjusted temporary worker visas without closing regulatory loopholes that allowed foreign contractors to displace local laborers in Maine's logging industry. In 2025, Golden was one of 46 House Democrats who broke with party leadership and joined all Republicans in passing the Laken Riley Act, a bill requiring federal authorities to detain undocumented immigrants charged with theft and certain other crimes. On January 22, 2026, he voted, joining a small group of moderate Democrats, to pass HR 7147, a funding bill for the United States Department of Homeland Security that included funding for United States Immigration and Customs Enforcement (ICE).

Conversely, Golden supported the American Dream and Promise Act (H.R. 6) to protect individuals covered under the Deferred Action for Childhood Arrivals (DACA) program, which gave them legislative protections and a pathway to legal status.

=== Law enforcement ===
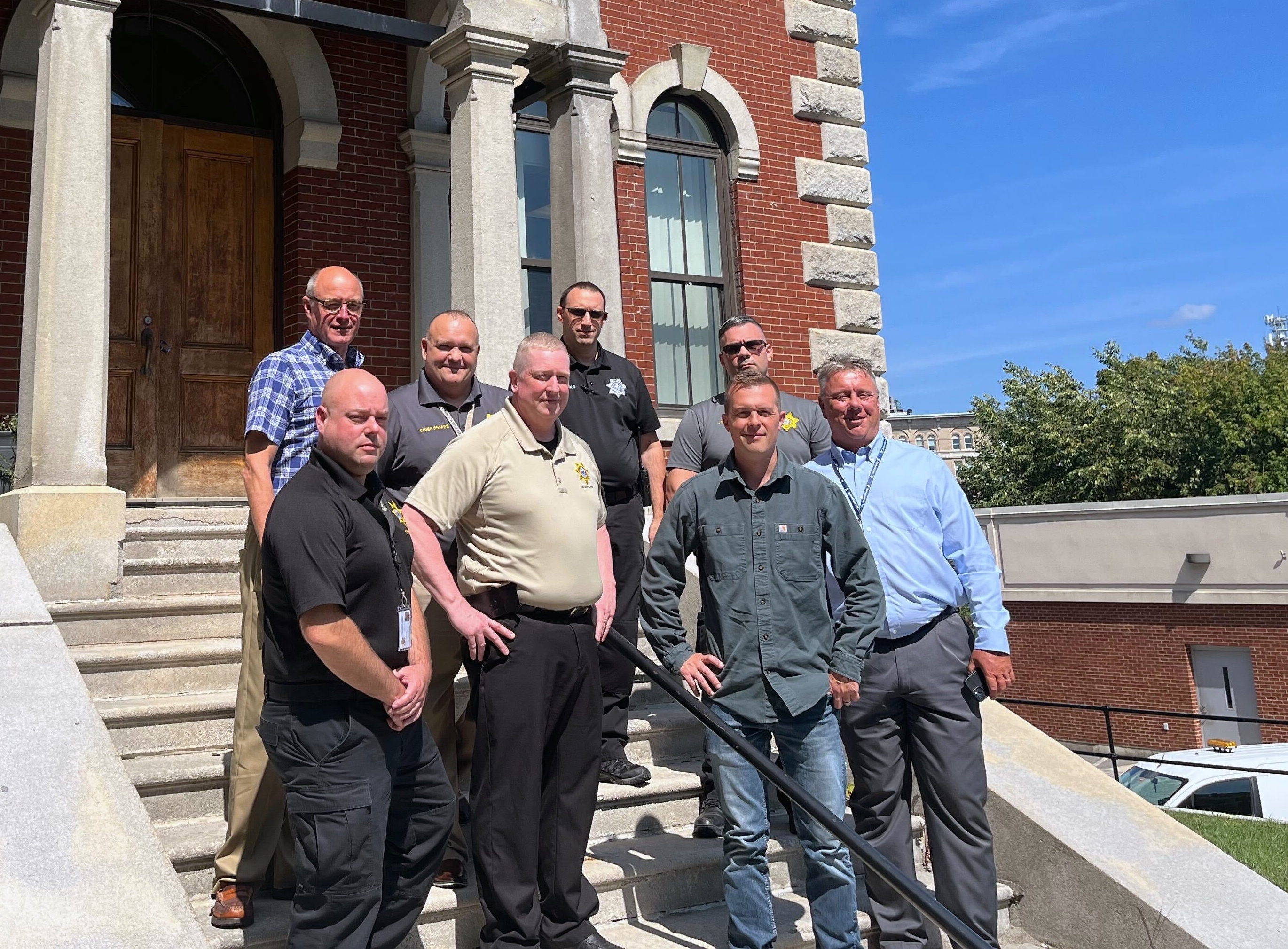
Golden meets with Penobscot County sheriff and staff.

In March 2021, Golden was one of two Democrats to vote with Republicans against the George Floyd Justice in Policing Act. While he acknowledged the bill had many good provisions, such as creating a national registry for police misconduct, increasing data collection, promoting de-escalation tactics, and banning chokeholds unless deadly force was authorized, he expressed concern over its proposed restrictions on qualified immunity for local and state officers. Golden argued that altering qualified immunity standards would negatively impact the recruitment and retention of police officers, particularly within rural communities in Maine. Golden also criticized the lack of bipartisan negotiations or committee amendments before the legislation was brought to a vote on the House floor.

==== Gun policy ====
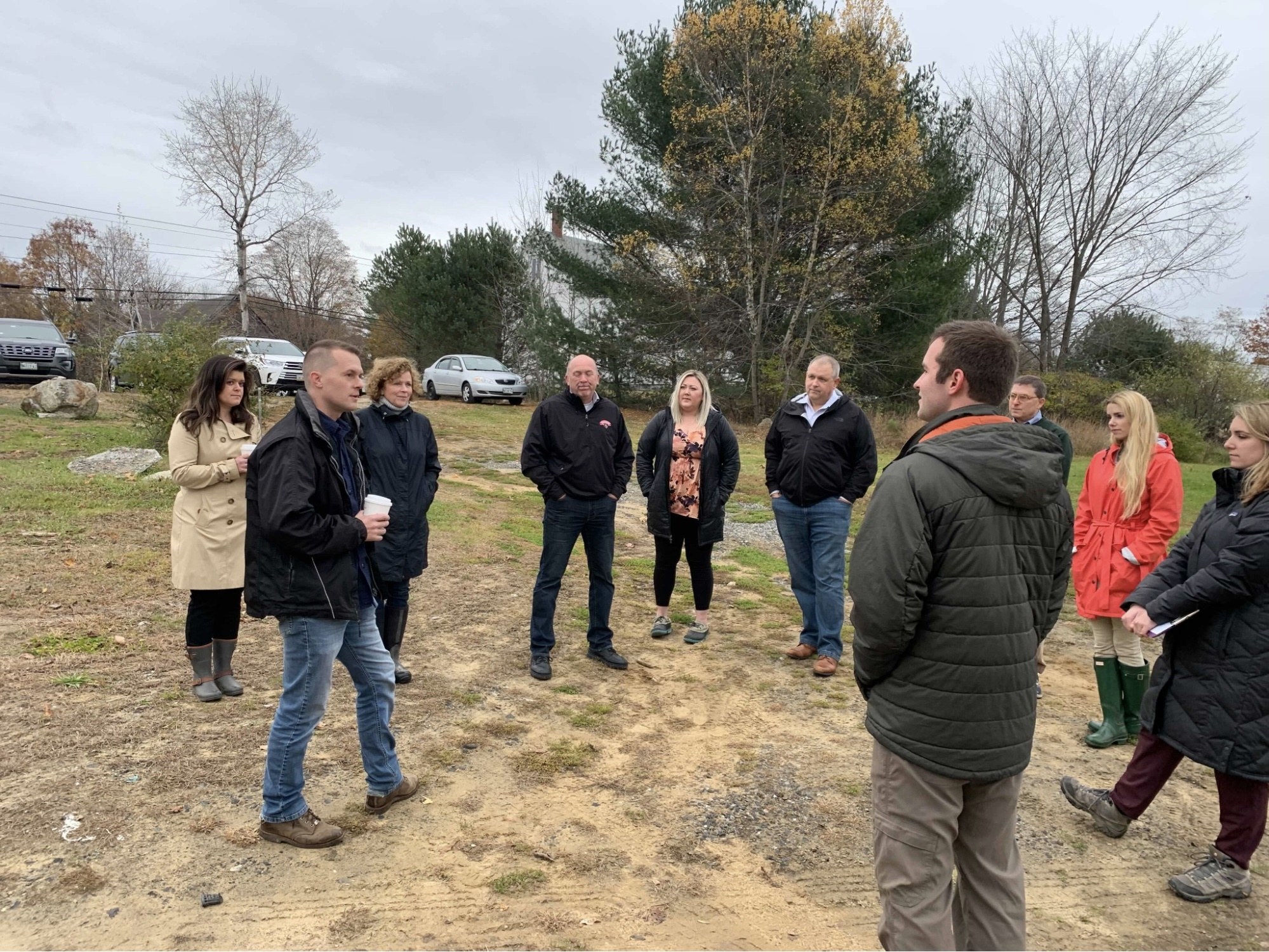
Golden meets with constituents.

Golden was initially a staunch supporter of gun rights, but in the wake of a shooting tragedy reconsidered his views. In 2021, he was the only Democrat to vote against the Bipartisan Background Checks Act, a bill that aimed to expand background checks for gun purchases. He was also one of two Democrats, along with Ron Kind of Wisconsin, to vote against the Enhanced Background Checks Act of 2021, a bill that sought to close the Charleston loophole. Both bills passed the House in March 2021. In 2022, Golden and Kurt Schrader of Oregon were the only Democrats to vote against raising the minimum age for purchasing semi-automatic centerfire rifles from 18 to 21. Later that year, Golden joined Republicans and four other Democrats in voting against a bill that proposed banning assault weapons.

However, after the 2023 Lewiston shootings in his hometown, in which 18 people were killed and 13 were wounded, Golden changed his stance. He publicly apologized for his previous opposition to restrictions on semi-automatic firearms, and called for a federal ban on assault weapons. In the subsequent legislative sessions, he transitioned to supporting federal background check expansions and targeted firearms restrictions aligned with his updated stance.

He stated in an interview with The Wall Street Journal, "I really believe that any law-abiding and competent citizen should have fairly easy access to firearms." However, the shooting raised questions for him, and he stated "Am I going to start carrying an AR-15 slung over my shoulder when I go to the grocery store, when I go to a restaurant?" He noted that the odds of being in the right place to stop an active shooter were slim. "And what responsibilities do I have as a leader of the community?"

=== LGBT rights ===
Golden voted in 2022 for the Respect for Marriage Act, which repealed the Defense of Marriage Act and federally protected same-sex and interracial marriages. He was one of four Democrats to join with the majority of House Republicans to pass the annual defense policy bill, which included provisions barring Pentagon funding for abortion and transgender surgeries.

=== Voting rights ===
On April 10, 2025, Golden was one of only four Democrats who joined all of the Republicans in the House in voting in favor of the Safeguard American Voter Eligibility Act, commonly known as the SAVE Act. The bill places strict requirements to prove American citizenship in order to vote in federal elections.

=== Other ===
In an op-ed written in June 2024, Golden argued that "While I don't plan to vote for him, Donald Trump is going to win. And I'm OK with that". He rejected the premise that a second Trump term would present "a unique threat to our democracy", and added that "pearl-clutching about a Trump victory ignores the strength of our democracy". He argued that the members of Congress, citizens and other institutions can hold the president accountable and defend democracy. Several community and Democratic leaders of Maine criticized him for writing the op-ed and accused him of minimizing threats posed by a second Trump presidency.

In response to a June 2025 incident involving Representative LaMonica McIver and a separate confrontation involving Senator Alex Padilla, Golden sharply broke with his party line. He panned the actions of his colleagues, characterizing their conduct as "politics as theatre". Golden criticized the conduct of fellow Democrat Padilla, saying that "storming into the FBI headquarters, trying to break up a press conference, and rushing a Cabinet secretary" is not appropriate behavior for someone in public office. Commenting on the physical altercation, he said that "where I come from, if you shove a police officer, you're probably getting arrested", while also adding that this doesn't justify excessive force by law enforcement officers. Other Democrats disagreed with his interpretation of what happened.

In September 2026, Golden voted for a resolution which denounced socialism and the Democratic Socialists of America, and called for the passage of the SAVE America Act.

== Personal life ==
Golden's wife, Isobel "Izzy" (née Moiles), whom he had met while attending Bates College, served as a Lewiston city councilor from 2016 to 2018. They have two daughters. Golden has several tattoos from his time in the military, including a Celtic cross on his forearm and a "devil dog" which represents his Marine unit.

== Electoral history ==
Maine's 2nd congressional district, 2018 Democratic primary elections results
Party	Candidate	Round 1			Round 3		
Party	Candidate	Votes	%	Transfer	Votes	% (gross)	% (net)
Democratic	Jared Golden	20,987	46.4%	+2,624	23,611	52.2%	54.3%
Democratic	Lucas St. Clair	17,742	39.2%	+2,111	19,853	43.9%	45.7%
Democratic	Craig Olson	3,993	8.8%	-3,993	Eliminated		
Democratic	Jonathan Fulford	2,489	5.5%	-2,489	Eliminated		
Total active votes		45,211	100%		43,464		100.0%
Exhausted ballots		—		+1,747	1,747	3.9%	
Total votes		45,211	100%		45,211	100.0%	

% (gross) = percent of all valid votes cast (without eliminating the exhausted votes)
% (net) = percent of votes cast after eliminating the exhausted votes

Maine's 2nd congressional district, 2018 general elections
Party	Candidate	Round 1			Round 3		
Party	Candidate	Votes	%	Transfer	Votes	% (gross)	% (net)
Democratic	Jared Golden	132,013	45.6%	+10,427	142,440	49.18%	50.62%
Republican	Bruce Poliquin (incumbent)	134,184	46.3%	+4,747	138,931	47.97%	49.38%
Independent	Tiffany Bond	16,552	5.7%	−16,552	Eliminated		
Independent	Will Hoar	6,875	2.4%	−6,875	Eliminated		
Total active votes		289,624	100%		281,371		100%
Exhausted ballots		—		+8,253	8,253	2.85%	
Total votes		289,624	100%		289,624	100%	

% (gross) = percent of all valid votes cast (without eliminating the exhausted votes)
% (net) = percent of votes cast after eliminating the exhausted votes

Maine's 2nd congressional district, 2020
Party	Candidate	Votes	%
Democratic	Jared Golden (incumbent)	197,974	53.0
Republican	Dale Crafts	175,228	46.9
Write-in		33	0.0
Total votes		373,235	100.0
Democratic hold			

Maine's 2nd congressional district, 2022 results
Party	Candidate	Round 1			Round 2		
Party	Candidate	Votes	%	Transfer	Votes	% (gross)	% (net)
Democratic	Jared Golden (incumbent)	153,074	48.38%	+12,062	165,136	52.20%	53.05%
Republican	Bruce Poliquin	141,260	44.65%	+4,882	146,142	46.19%	46.95%
Independent	Tiffany Bond	21,655	6.84%	−21,655	Eliminated		
Write-in		393	0.12%	−393	Eliminated		
Total active votes		316,382	100%		311,278		100%
Exhausted ballots		—		+5,104	5,104	1.61%	
Total votes		316,382	100%		316,382	100%	
Democratic hold							

% (gross) = percent of all valid votes cast (without eliminating the exhausted votes)
% (net) = percent of votes cast after eliminating the exhausted votes

Maine's 2nd congressional district, 2024
Party	Candidate	Votes	%
Democratic	Jared Golden (incumbent)	197,151	50.35
Republican	Austin Theriault	194,445	49.65
Total votes		391,596	100.00

U.S. House of Representatives
Preceded by Bruce Poliquin	Member of the U.S. House of Representatives from Maine's 2nd congressional district 2019–present	Incumbent
Party political offices
Preceded by Stephanie Murphy as Chair of the Blue Dog Coalition for Administration	Chair of the Blue Dog Coalition for Administration and Communications; 2023; Served alongside: Jim Costa (Policy)	Succeeded by Himself as Chair of the Blue Dog Coalition for Administration
Preceded by Tom O'Halleran as Chair of the Blue Dog Coalition for Communications	Chair of the Blue Dog Coalition for Administration and Communications; 2023; Served alongside: Jim Costa (Policy)	Succeeded by Marie Pérez as Chair of the Blue Dog Coalition for Communications
Preceded by Himself as Chair of the Blue Dog Coalition for Administration and Communications	Chair of the Blue Dog Coalition for Administration; 2023–2025; Served alongside: Marie Pérez (Communications), Mary Peltola (Policy)	Succeeded by Marie Pérez
U.S. order of precedence (ceremonial)
Preceded by Sylvia Garcia	United States representatives by seniority 203rd	Succeeded by Lance Gooden
