= Borders of Syria =

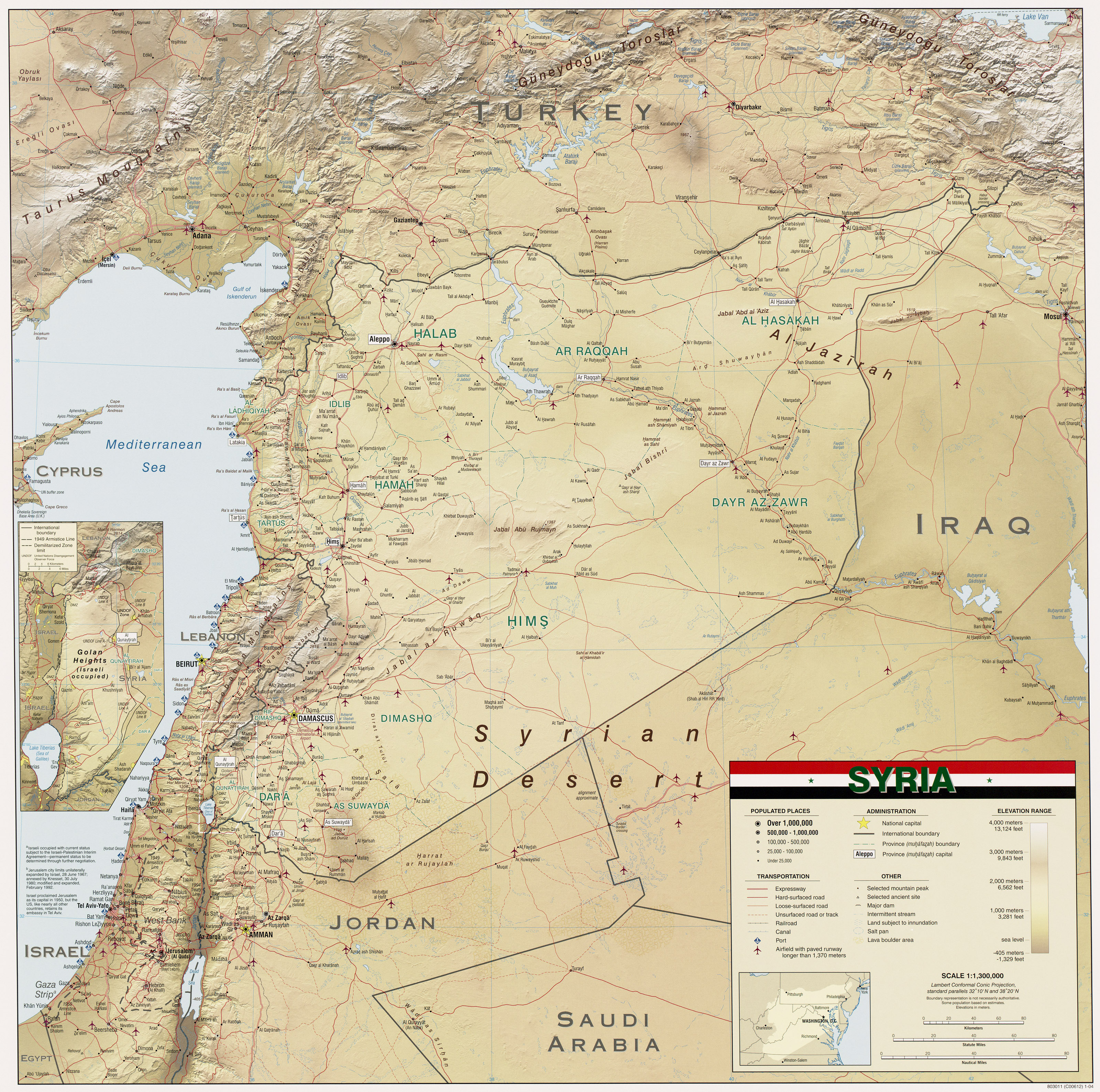
Syria, 2004 CIA map

Syria borders:

- Turkey: Syria–Turkey border to the north and somewhat northwest
- Iraq: Iraq–Syria border to the east and southeast
- Jordan: Jordan–Syria border to the south
- Israel: Israel–Syria border to the southwest
- Lebanon: Lebanon–Syria border to the southwest
- the Mediterranean Sea to the west; maritime borders with Turkey (north) and Lebanon (south).

Not all border is properly demarcated.

Territorial disputes of Syria include Golan Heights (with Israel), Hatay Province (with Turkey), Deir al-Ashayer (with Lebanon). In the past there was some dispute with Lebanon about Shebaa Farms, and the area was never properly demarcated, but now it is under the Israeli occupation.

== Historical maps ==
Islamic Syria and its provinces, 9th century

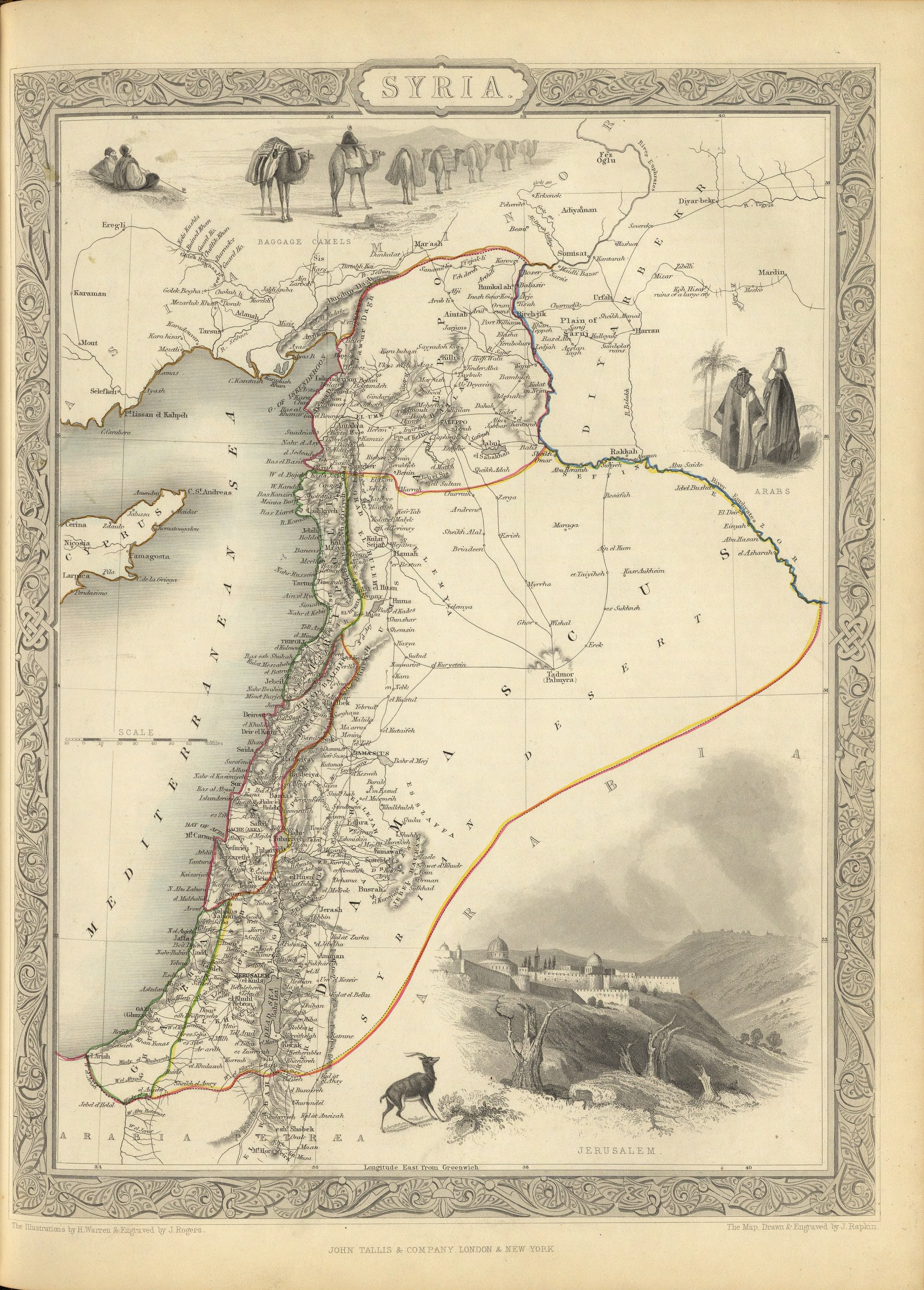
Map by Henry Warren, 1851

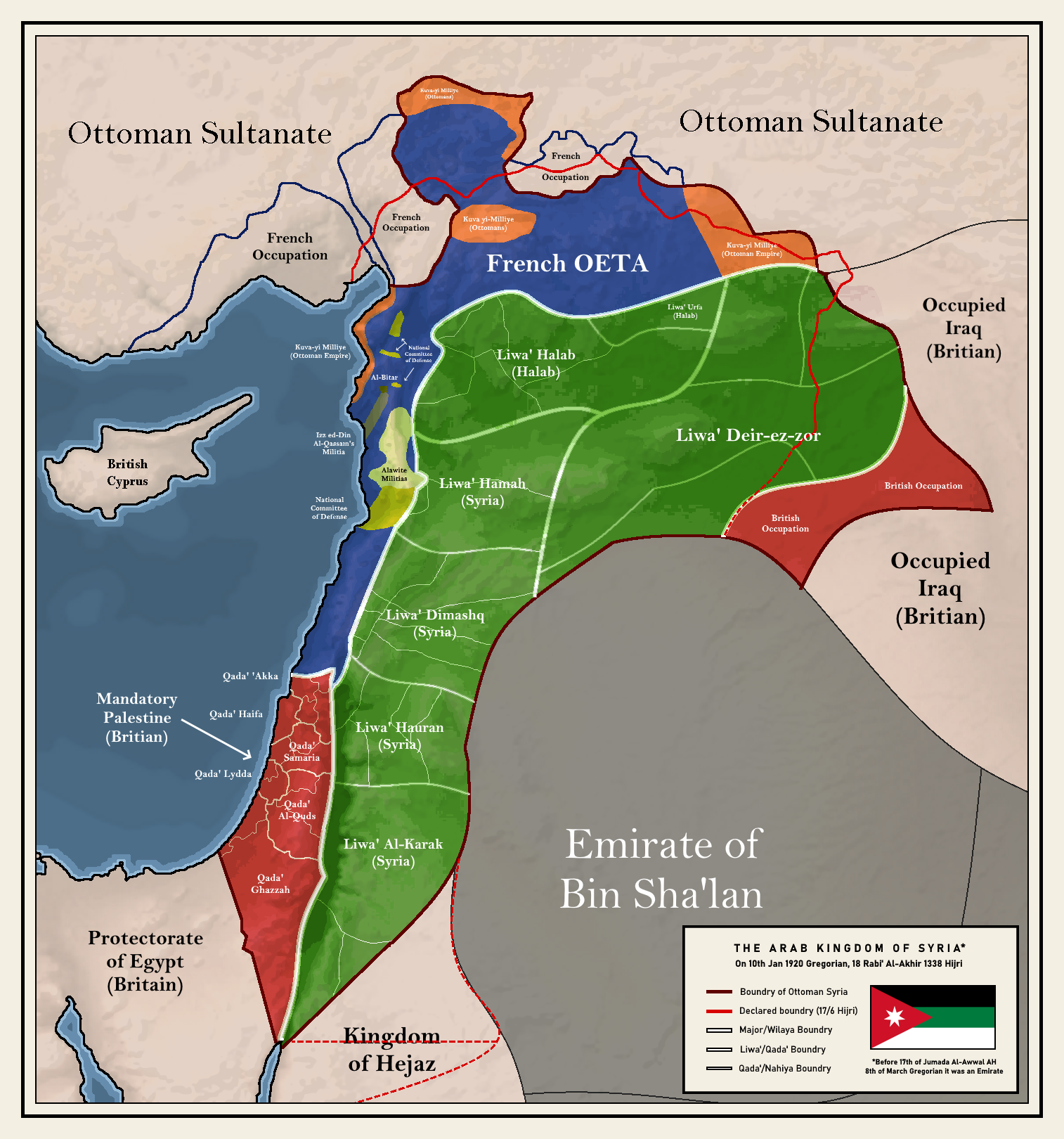
Arab Kingdom of Syria, March-July 1920

States of Damascus and Aleppo

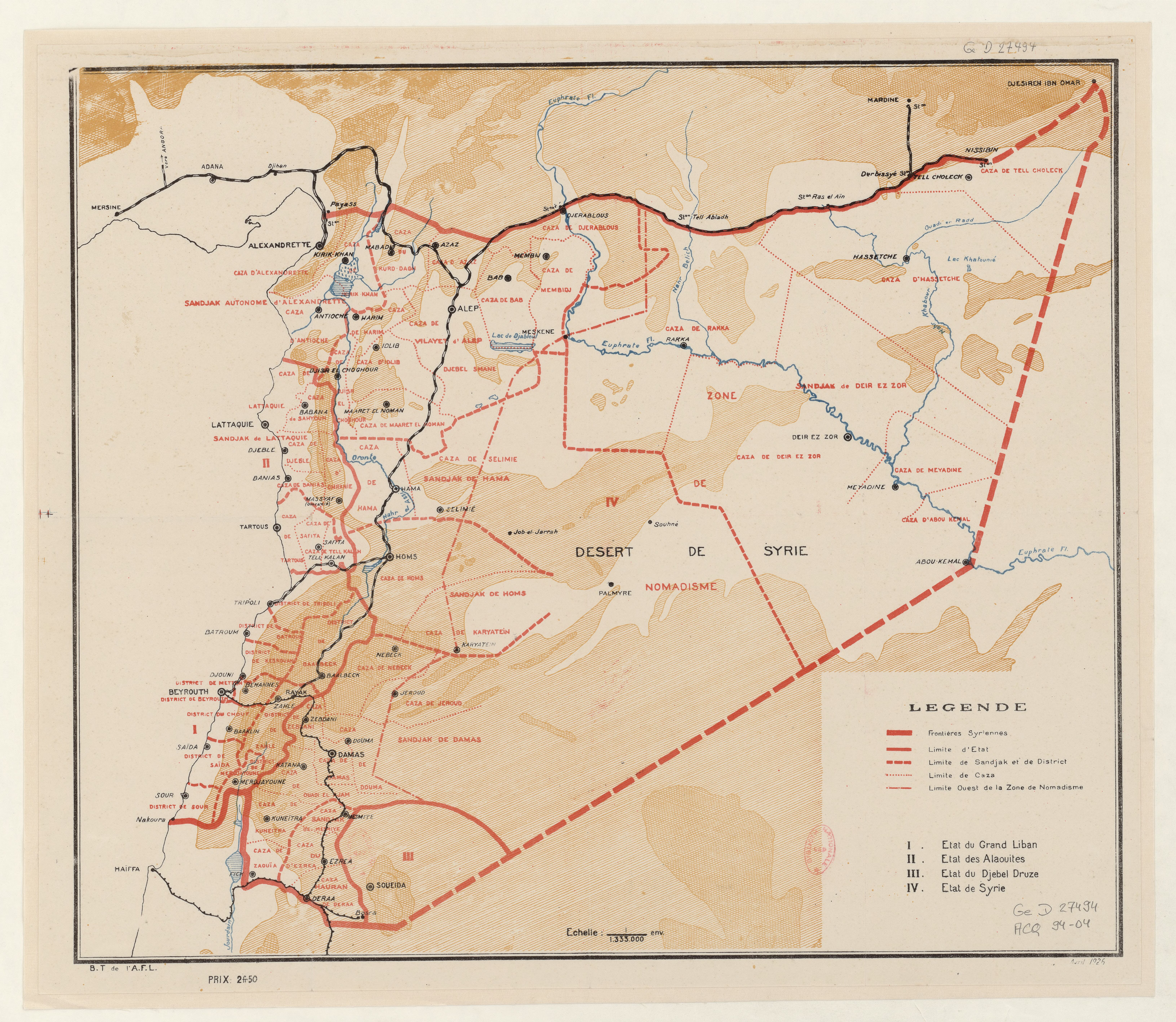
French mandate 1926

First Syrian Republic

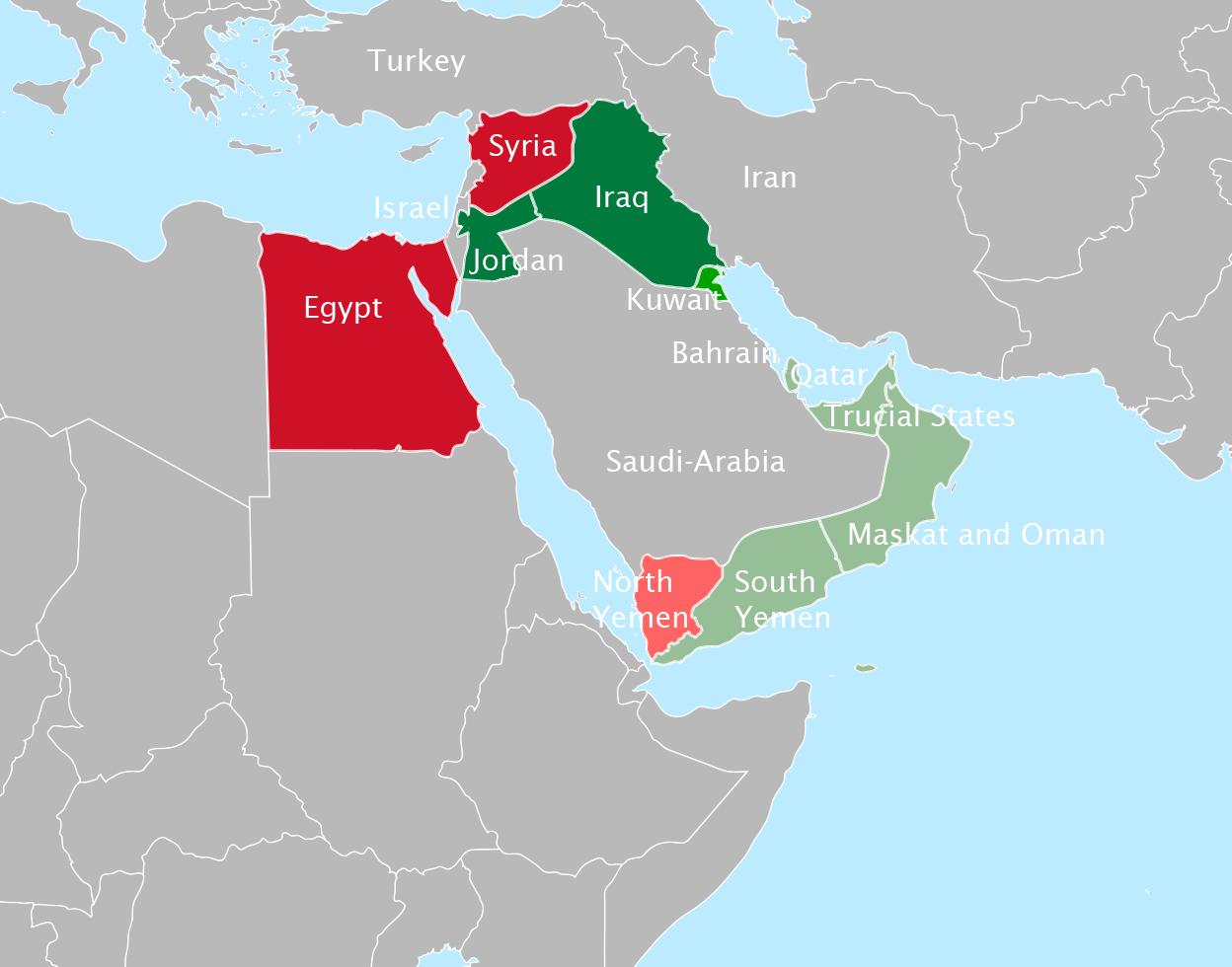
Syria within the United Arab Republic

== See also ==
- Geography of Syria
