= Elizabeth Caruso =

American politician

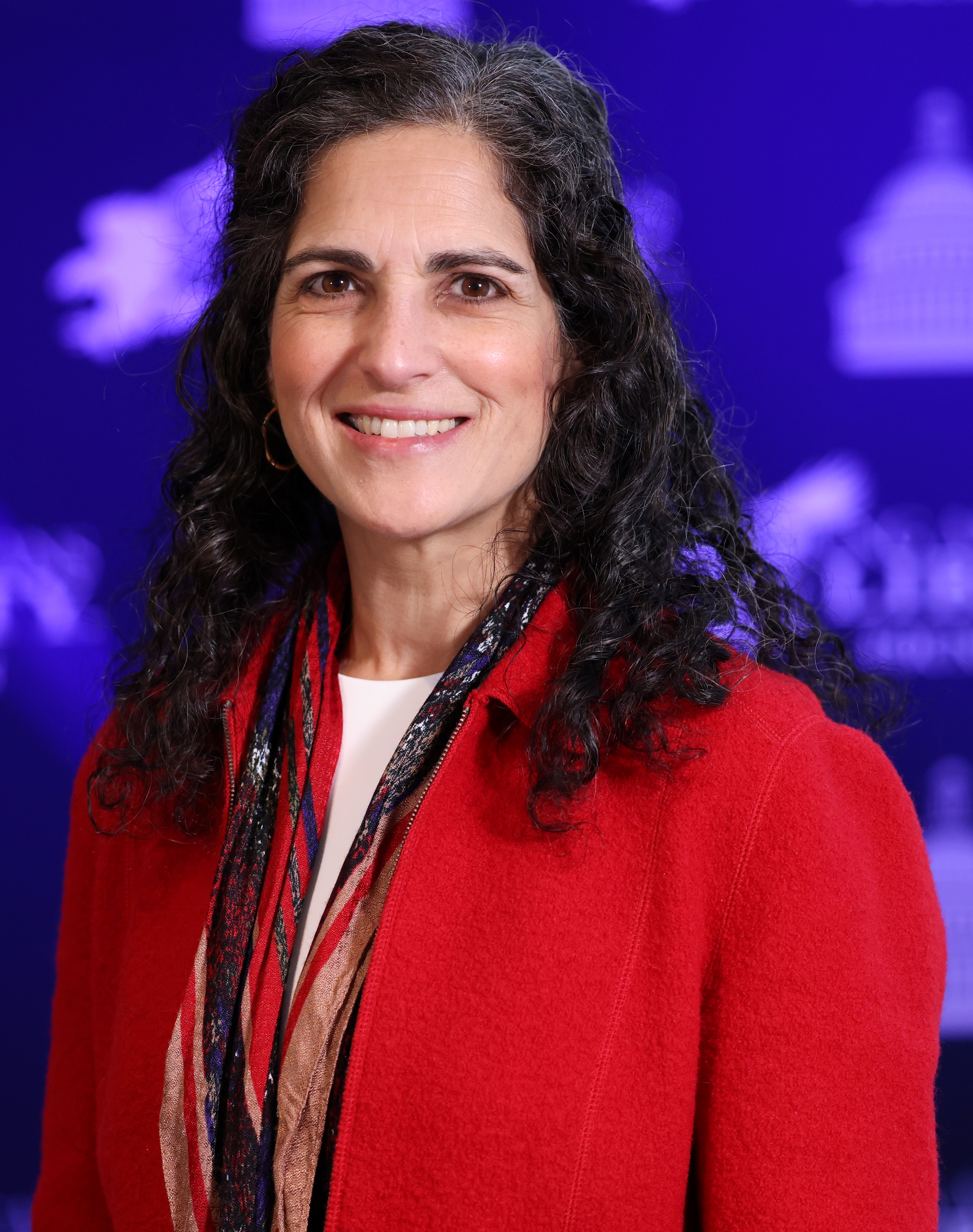

Member of the Maine House of Representatives from the 72nd district
- Incumbent
- Assumed office December 3, 2024
- Preceded by: Larry Dunphy

Personal details
- Party: Republican

Elizabeth "Liz" M. Caruso is an American politician. She has served as a member of the Maine House of Representatives since December 2024.

Caruso was a candidate for Maine's 2nd congressional district in the 2022 United States House of Representatives elections in Maine. She was previously a Caratunk first selectman.
