= Michael Willette =

American politician

Michael J. Willette

Member of the Maine Senate from the 2nd district
- In office 2014–2016
- Preceded by: Ronald F. Collins
- Succeeded by: Michael E. Carpenter

Member of the Maine House of Representatives from the 5th district
- In office December 2008 – December 2012
- Succeeded by: Robert Saucier

Personal details
- Party: Republican (2010–present); Democratic (before 2010)
- Education: University of Maine, University of New Hampshire
- Profession: Realtor

Michael J. Willette is an American realtor and politician in Maine. Willette represented District 5 in the Maine House of Representatives, which was part of Aroostook County from 2008 to 2012. He is a resident of the town of Presque Isle. Willette was first elected in 2008 as a Democrat. He was re-elected in 2010 as a Democrat but switched affiliations to the Republican Party prior to being sworn in. He is a realtor by profession.

In 2012, he was targeted by the Maine Democratic Party and, as of a week prior to the election, the Democratic Party and outside groups had spent tens of thousands of dollars on ads against Willette. That same year, Willette was defeated for re-election by Democrat Robert Saucier.

In November 2014, he faced former Maine Attorney General Michael E. Carpenter for Senate District 2, defeating him. He did not seek re-election in 2016.

Willette is a United States Army veteran of Operation Desert Storm. He also served for one term on the School Committee of MSAD 1. He is the father of State Representative Alexander Willette, who was first elected in 2010.

== Controversy ==
On March 1, 2015, the Maine Democratic Party started a petition against Willette, asking for his withdrawal from the Maine Senate for posting a controversial meme that many Democrats found to be racist, and defaming. The meme showed a picture of Barack Obama which captioned: "Why haven't I done anything about ISIS? Because I will deal with them at the family reunion." He later apologized for posting the meme publicly, but not for the content itself. It was further revealed by liberal activist Mike Tipping, who posted the initial reports of the meme to his Bangor Daily News blog, that Willette's Facebook page has a history of racist and anti-Muslim postings, some of which perpetuate the belief that President Obama is a Muslim.

Willette apologized and asked for forgiveness for his posts on the Senate floor on March 11, stating that he had been disappointed by Obama since voting for him in 2008 and that his frustration led him to make his posts. He also stated that he did not subscribe to Birther theories about Obama not being born in the United States and has no hostility towards Muslims or immigrants, as well as adding "I am as far from being a racist as you can get". The Maine branch of the NAACP stated his apology was insufficient. Senate Democrats met with Senate President Michael Thibodeau to request some sort of public rebuke of Willette's posts, such as a legislative resolution, but Thibodeau told reporters that he found the apology sufficient to settle the matter. Willette told reporters that he would not resign.

The Maine Republican Party issued a statement stating it "disagrees with the substance, spirit and sentiment" of Willette's posts, while also criticizing Maine Democratic Party calls for Willette's resignation by stating that Democrats are "throwing stones from glass houses" as they had made similar controversial comments about Vice President Dick Cheney and President George W. Bush.

Willette resigned his chairmanship of the Legislature's State and Local Government Committee on March 25, 2015, something the Portland chapter of the NAACP had called for since March 20. Willette had no comment to the media on the matter, but Sen. Thibodeau said that "Sen. Willette recognized that maybe it’s time to turn the page" and commended him for putting the Legislature's interests ahead of his own.
