= 2015 Portland, Maine, mayoral election =

- November 3, 2015
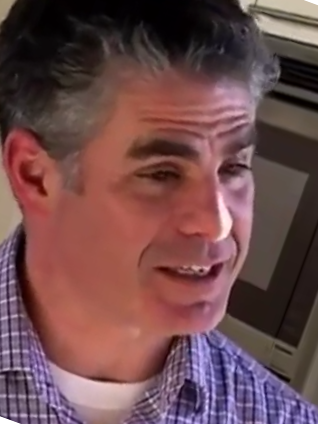

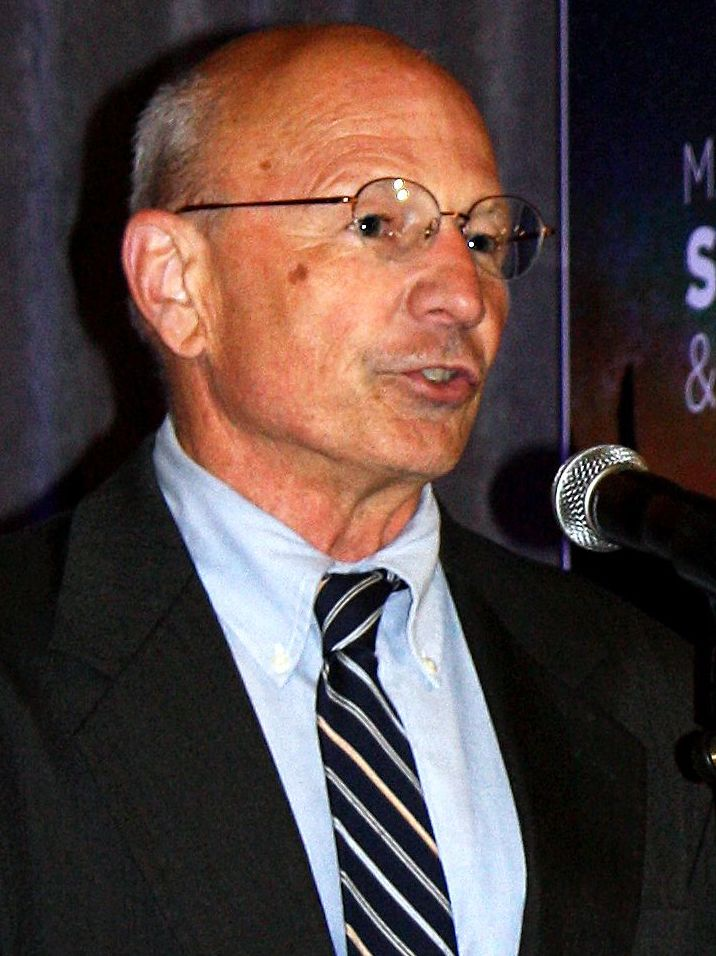

| Candidate | Ethan Strimling | Michael F. Brennan | Tom MacMillan |
| Party | Nonpartisan | Nonpartisan | Nonpartisan |
| Popular vote | 9,163 | 6,884 | 1,883 |
| Percentage | 51.1% | 38.4% | 10.5% |
Mayor before election
Michael F. Brennan
Elected mayor
Ethan Strimling

Portland, Maine, held an election for mayor on November 3, 2015. It was the second election since Portland voters approved a citywide referendum changing the city charter to recreate an elected mayor position in 2010.

The new citizen-elected mayor serves full-time in the position for a four-year term, exercises the powers and duties enumerated in Article II Section 5 of the Portland City Charter, be elected using instant-runoff voting, and, like the rest of municipal government in Portland, be officially non-partisan. Ethan Strimling defeated incumbent mayor Michael F. Brennan and fellow challenger Tom MacMillan.

== Candidates ==
=== Official candidates ===
- Michael Brennan, incumbent mayor of Portland and Back Cove resident
- Tom MacMillan, Portland chair of the Maine Green Independent Party and Parkside resident
- Ethan Strimling, former State Senator, political pundit, and West End resident

=== Failed to make ballot ===
- Christopher Vail, North Deering resident, Portland firefighter

=== Declined ===
- Jill Duson, at-large city councilor and candidate for mayor in 2011
- Cheryl Leeman, former city councilor for District 4 (1984–2014) and former mayor (1988–1989; 2000–2001)
- Jon Hinck, at-large city councilor, former State Representative, and candidate for the U.S. Senate in 2012
- David Marshall, city councilor for District 2 and candidate for mayor in 2011
- Nicholas Mavodones, at-large city councilor, former mayor (1999–2000; 2006–2007; 2010–2011), and candidate for mayor in 2011 (endorsed Strimling)
- Jed Rathband, political consultant and candidate for mayor in 2011
- Edward Suslovic, city councilor for District 3, former mayor (2007–2008), and former state representative (endorsed Strimling)

== Campaign ==
The day after Ethan Strimling announced his candidacy for mayor, a group of city councilors and school board members led by Nicholas Mavodones announced their opposition to the reelection of Mayor Brennan and support of Strimling. Mavodones cited division within the city and city government as well as an atmosphere of frustration under Brennan's leadership. Borth incumbent Brennan and Strimling opposed a $15 minium wage while MacMillan ran on raising the city's minium wage to $15.

== Endorsements ==
Michael Brennan

State legislators (Portland Democrats unless otherwise specified)

- Justin Alfond, State Senator, former President of the Maine Senate
- Mark Eves, Speaker of the Maine House of Representatives (D-North Berwick)
- Richard Farnsworth, state representative
- Denise Harlow, state representative
- Erik Jorgensen, state representative
- Peter Stuckey, state representative
- Andrew Gattine, State Representative (D-Westbrook)

Unions

- Longshoremen’s Benevolent Association, ILA Local 861
Tom MacMillan

State legislators

- Harlan Baker, State Representative (1979-1988) (D-Portland)

Other political endorsements

- Nisha Swinton, Water District Board of Trustees, Unenrolled
- Ben Meiklejohn, School Board (2001-2007) and former co-chair of the Maine Green Independent Party
- Asher Platts, former chair of the Maine Green Independent Party
- Jorge Maderal, Chair, Libertarian Party of Maine
Ethan Strimling

City councilors

- Kevin Donoghue
- Jill Duson
- Nicholas Mavodones
- Edward Suslovic

Portland School Board members

- Sarah Thompson, chairwoman
- Pious Ali
- John Eder, former state representative (G-Portland)
- Anna Trevorrow
- Holly Seeliger
- Stephanie Hatzenbuehler
- Marnie Morrione

State legislators

- Anne Haskell, State Senator (D-Portland)
- Gerald Talbot, former State representative (D-Portland)

Unions

- United Association of Journeymen and Apprentices of the Plumbing and Pipe Fitting Industry, UA Local 716
- Sheet Metal Workers’ International Association Local Union No 17
- International Association of Fire Fighters Local 740
- Professional Firefighters of Maine
- Maine State Building and Construction Trades Council

Media

- Portland Press Herald

== Polling ==
| Poll source | Date(s) administered | Sample size | Margin of error | Michael Brennan | Tom MacMillan | Ethan Strimling | Christopher Vail | Other/ Undecided |
|---|---|---|---|---|---|---|---|---|
| Maine People's Resource Center | August 22–24, 2015 | 451 | ±4.5% | 21.4% | 4% | 46% | 2.2% | 26.4% |

== Election results ==
Portland Mayoral Election, 2015
| Candidate | Votes | % |
|---|---|---|
| Ethan Strimling | 9,163 | 51.1% |
| Michael F. Brennan | 6,884 | 38.4% |
| Thomas MacMillan | 1,880 | 10.5% |
| Total votes | 17,930 | 100.0 |

== See also ==
- List of mayors of Portland, Maine
