= 2018 United States Senate election in Maine =

- November 6, 2018
- Turnout: 59.96%
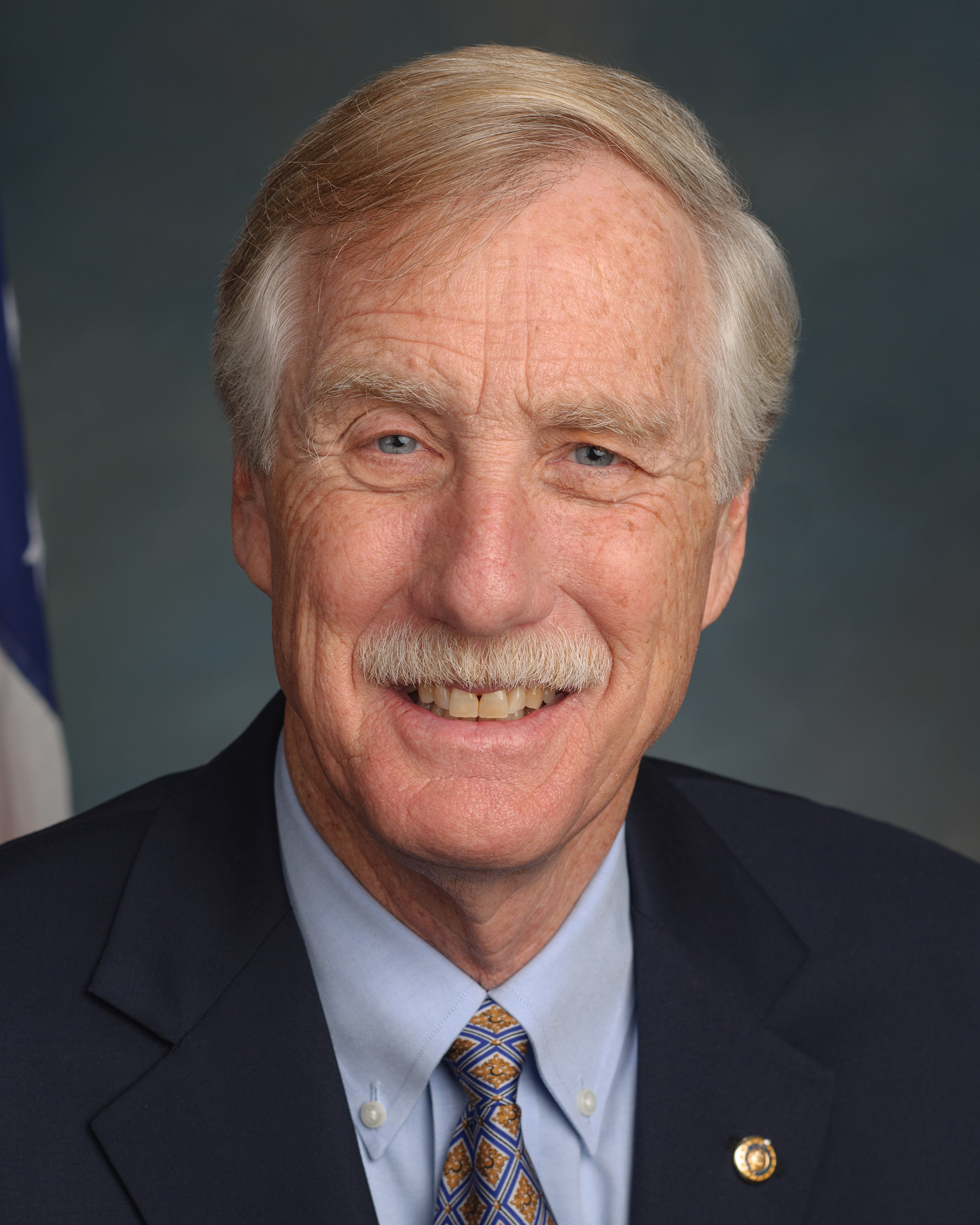

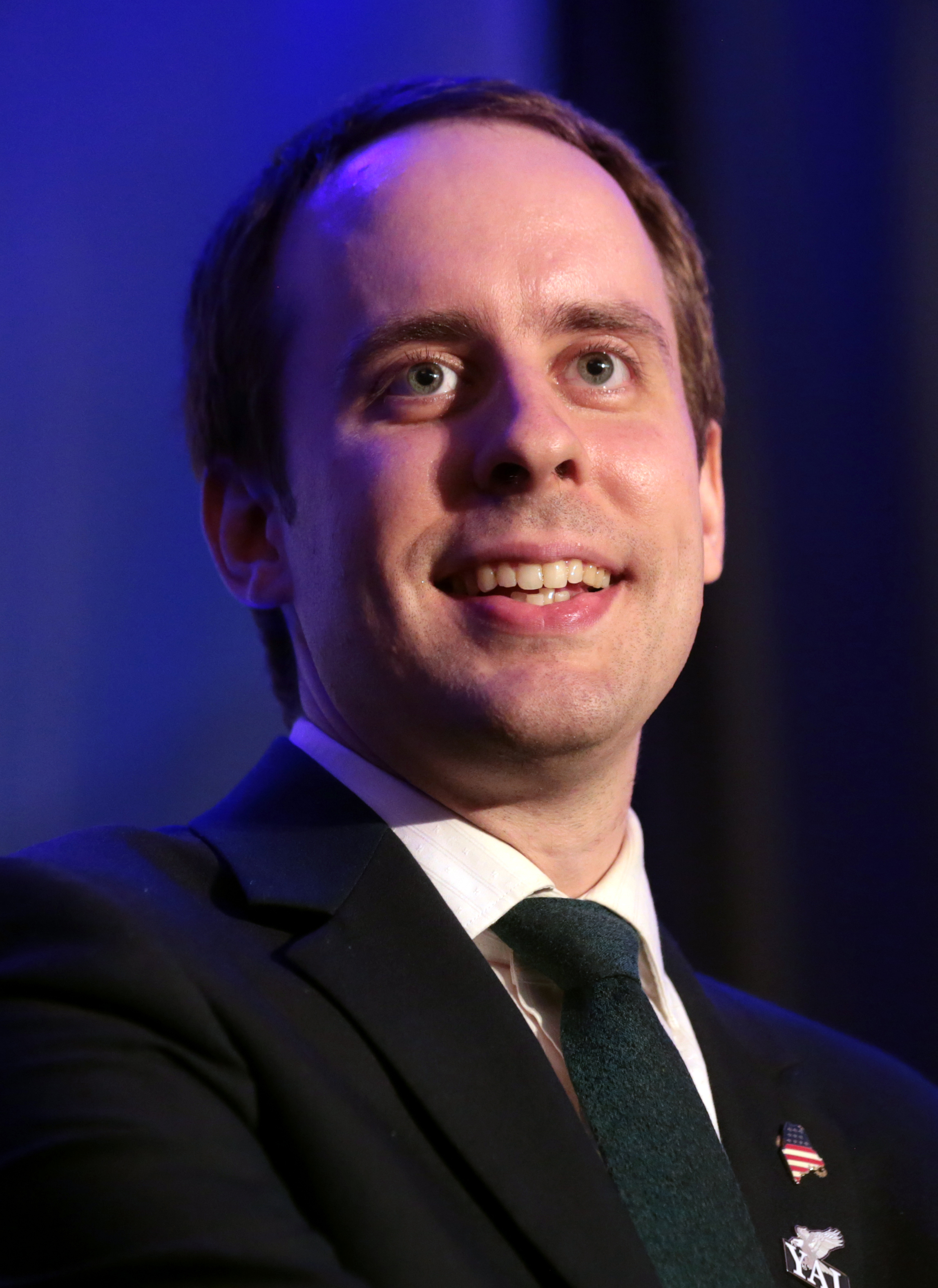

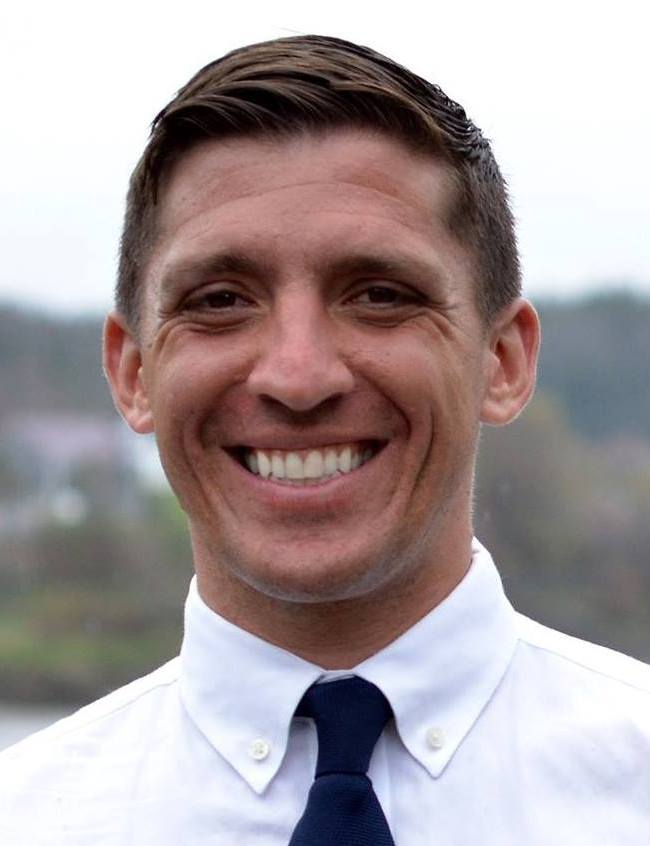
Nominee	Angus King	Eric Brakey	Zak Ringelstein
Party	Independent	Republican	Democratic
Popular vote	344,575	223,502	66,268
Percentage	54.31%	35.23%	10.45%
- King: 40–50% 50–60% 60–70% 70–80% 80–90% >90% Brakey: 40–50% 50–60% 60–70% 70–80% 80–90% >90% Tie
U.S. senator before election
Angus King
Independent
Elected U.S. Senator
Angus King
Independent

The 2018 United States Senate election in Maine was held on November 6, 2018, alongside a gubernatorial election, U.S. House elections, and other state and local elections. Incumbent independent Senator Angus King won re-election to a second term, defeating Democratic nominee Zak Ringelstein and Republican nominee Eric Brakey. This was one of two independent-held Senate seats up for election in a state that Hillary Clinton won in the 2016 presidential election.

The primary election was held on June 12, 2018.

The U.S. Senate elections were conducted with ranked-choice voting, as opposed to a simple plurality, after Maine voters passed a citizen referendum approving the change in 2016 and a June 2018 referendum sustaining the change. Ranked choice voting was used in the primary elections as well. The first round of each election saw a majority, and the instant runoff did not need to be carried out.

== Background ==
A part of New England, Maine was once a bastion of the Republican Party, and was one of two states to vote against Franklin Roosevelt all four times he ran for president. Lyndon Johnson won the state in 1964, and Hubert Humphrey carried it in 1968 before the state reverted to form and reestablished a GOP voting streak that lasted until the 1990s. With the GOP progressively becoming more culturally conservative, the state began moving toward the Democrats, and Bill Clinton carried it in 1992. Clinton's win established a Democratic winning streak that lasted until Donald Trump won an electoral vote from the state's second congressional district in 2016 despite losing the rest of the state.

The state has a tradition of electing various independent candidates to high office, such as Angus King, who served as governor of the state from 1995 to 2003. In 2012, King's decision to run for the Senate seat being vacated by Republican Olympia Snowe dramatized the battle for the Senate, as he left open whether he would caucus with the Republicans or the Democrats. He eventually decided to caucus with the Democrats, and has established a center-left voting record.

== Independents ==
King said his reelection plans would not be affected by treatment for prostate cancer, which he announced he had on June 22, 2015.

=== Candidates ===
==== Declared ====
- Angus King, incumbent U.S. senator

== Republican primary ==
On January 12, 2015, Maine Governor Paul LePage made a statement on Howie Carr's radio program that he might run for U.S. Senate against King, citing King's switching his endorsement in the 2014 gubernatorial election from independent candidate Eliot Cutler to Democratic candidate Mike Michaud as a "horrible thing to do". The next day, LePage said his comment was a joke, though on an August 25, 2015 appearance on Carr's program, he said he was "very strongly" considering running, citing King's caucusing with Senate Democrats. LePage also criticized King for his involvement in the Maine wind energy industry, saying King "ripped us off by $104 million during his eight years as governor – he ripped us off, royally, and I can’t wait until 2018 because I’m thinking that’s the guy I'm going after." A spokesman for King dismissed LePage's criticism.

On May 10, 2016, LePage announced at a town hall meeting in Oakland that he would run against King unless he was hired by the Donald Trump administration. On May 10, 2017, LePage decided not to run; his spokesman said he preferred to focus on being governor. On July 20, 2017, LePage again said he "might" challenge King. Trump personally encouraged LePage to run and offered his endorsement. LePage did not file to run by the March 15, 2018 deadline.

Eric Brakey's campaign successfully contested 258 signatures to Max Linn's petitions to appear on the primary ballot, which meant that Linn had 10 fewer signatures than the 2,000 needed to be on the ballot. Maine Secretary of State Matthew Dunlap then declared Linn ineligible to be a candidate, although it was too late to remove Linn's name from the ballot. Voters were informed of Linn's status when they voted, and any votes cast for him were counted as blanks. Nevertheless, Linn's campaign was active on Twitter and placed campaign signs along roads in Maine. Linn signs were also seen in New Hampshire, including in Dover. Dover city officials said they would remove the signs upon request if Linn's campaign did not remove them, because Linn is not a candidate in a New Hampshire election and because the signs were placed improperly. Linn appealed the decision to disqualify him to U.S. District Court in Portland, but Judge Nancy Torresen rejected Linn's request for an injunction to bar Dunlap from informing voters he was ineligible. Linn subsequently announced that he would run against U.S. Senator Susan Collins in the 2020 Republican primary election.

=== Candidates ===
==== On the ballot ====
- Eric Brakey, state senator

==== Declared ineligible ====
- Max Linn, financial planner, Reform nominee for governor of Florida in 2006 and Democratic candidate for FL-10 in 2008

==== Declined ====
- Mark Holbrook, clinical psychologist and nominee for ME-01 in 2016 (ran for ME-01)
- Paul LePage, governor of Maine (2011-2019)

=== Endorsements ===
Eric Brakey

U.S. senators

- Ted Cruz, U.S. senator (R-TX)
- Rand Paul, U.S. senator (R-KY)

U.S. governors

- Paul LePage, governor of Maine

U.S. representatives

- Ron Paul, former congressman, presidential candidate in 2008 and 2012

State officials

- Rick Bennett, former Maine Senate president and Maine Republican Party chairman

Individuals

- Austin Petersen, candidate for U.S. Senate in Missouri in 2018 and Libertarian candidate for president in 2016

Organizations

- NRA Political Victory Fund

==== Results ====
Results by county Map legend: Brakey—70–80%; Brakey—60–70%; Brakey—50–60%; Blank ballots—50–60%

Republican primary results
Party	Candidate	Votes	%
Republican	Eric Brakey	59,853	58.92%
Republican	Blank ballots	41,732	41.08%
Total votes		101,585	100.00%

== Democratic primary ==
The Democratic primary race initially included both teacher Zak Ringelstein and homebuilder Benjamin Pollard, but Pollard withdrew to run as an independent two days after Ringelstein announced a list of 16 endorsements from Democratic state legislators. Ringelstein was the only major-party candidate for Senate to be a dues-paying member of the Democratic Socialists of America in 2018.

=== Candidates ===
==== Declared ====
- Zak Ringelstein, teacher and founder of UClass

==== Withdrawn ====
- Benjamin Pollard, homebuilder and primary and write-in candidate for the U.S. Senate in 2012

==== Declined ====
- Cynthia Dill, former state senator and nominee for the U.S. Senate in 2012
- Diane Russell, former state representative (ran for governor)

=== Endorsements ===
Zak Ringelstein

State senators

- Mark Dion, state senator, gubernatorial candidate
- James Handy, state representative and former state senator
- John Patrick, former state senator

State representatives

- Robert Alley, state representative
- Harlan Baker, former state representative
- Dillon Bates, state representative
- Henry John Bear, state representative
- Benjamin Collings, state representative
- Donna Doore, state representative
- Richard Farnsworth, state representative
- Scott Hamann, state representative
- Mark Lawrence, state representative
- Colleen Madigan, state representative
- Deane Rykerson, state representative
- Stephen Stanley, state representative
- Michael Sylvester, state representative

Other politicians

- Betsy Sweet, former director of the Maine Women's Lobby and 2018 candidate for governor

Journalists, commentators, and editors

- Cenk Uygur, co-founder of The Young Turks

Organizations

- Demand Universal Healthcare
- Democratic Socialists of America
- Indivisible Lincoln County
- Local Berniecrats Maine
- Political Revolution
- Southern Maine Democratic Socialists of America
- Veterans for Bernie Sanders

=== Results ===
Results by county Map legend: Ringelstein—70–80%; Ringelstein—60–70%

Democratic primary results
Party	Candidate	Votes	%
Democratic	Zak Ringelstein	89,841	67.65%
Democratic	Blank ballots	42,955	32.35%
Total votes		132,795	100.00%

== Libertarian primary ==
=== Candidates ===
==== Failed to make ballot ====
- Chris Lyons, write-in candidate for the U.S. Senate in 2014

== General election ==
=== Candidates ===
- Eric Brakey, state senator (R)
- Angus King, incumbent (I)
- Zak Ringelstein, teacher and founder of UClass (D)

=== Endorsements ===
Angus King (I)

Statewide politicians

- Bill Cohen, former United States secretary of defense and U.S. senator (R-ME)
- Adam Cote, Democratic primary candidate for governor of Maine, 2018
- George J. Mitchell, former U.S. Senate majority leader (D-ME)

Local politicians

- Mary Black Andrews, former member of the Maine House of Representatives (Republican)
- Michael Brennan, former mayor of Portland, former member of the Maine Senate, 2018 candidate for the Maine House of Representatives (Democrat)
- Joe Brooks, former member of the Maine House of Representatives (independent)
- Michael Carpenter, member of the Maine Senate, former Maine Attorney General (Democrat)
- Alan Casavant, former member of the Maine House of Representatives, mayor of Biddeford (Democrat)
- Mary Cathcart, former member of the Maine Senate (Democrat)
- Dennis Damon, former member of the Maine Senate (Democrat)
- Mabel Desmond, former member of the Maine House of Representatives (Democrat)
- Robert W. Duplessie, former member of the Maine House of Representatives (Democrat)
- Alan Duplessis, selectman, Jackman
- Anne Haskell, former member of the Maine Senate
- Matt Jacobson, businessman and candidate for the Republican nomination for governor of Maine in 2010
- Roger Katz, member of the Maine Senate (Republican)
- David Lemoine, former member of the Maine House of Representatives (Democrat)
- Sharon Libby Jones, former member of the Maine House of Representatives (Democrat)
- Joyce Maker, former member of the Maine Senate (Republican)
- Dennis Marble, candidate for the Maine Senate in 2016 (independent)
- Judy Paradis, former member of the Maine House of Representatives (Democrat)
- Patrick Paradis, former member of the Maine House of Representatives, former interim mayor of Augusta (Democrat)
- Anne C. Perry, former member of the Maine House of Representatives (Democrat)
- Wendy Pieh, former member of the Maine House of Representatives (Democrat)
- Tom Saviello, member of the Maine Senate (Republican)
- Mary Small, former member of the Maine House of Representatives, former member of the Maine Senate (Republican)
- Meredith Strang Burgess, former member of the Maine House of Representatives (Republican)
- Richard G. Woodbury, former member of the Maine Senate (independent)

Other individuals

- Rick Cailler, president, Lewiston Firefighters Union
- Fred Forsley, businessman, founder, Shipyard Brewing Company
- Bill Haggett, businessman, CEO of Pineland Farms
- Kevin Hancock, businessman, CEO of Hancock Lumber
- Mary Allen Lindeman, businesswoman, co-founder of Coffee By Design
- Linda Lord, Maine state librarian
- Anne Roosevelt, businesswoman, former CEO of Goodwill Industries of Northern New England
- Wendy Wolf, medical doctor, activist
- Mark Woodward, journalist, former editor of the Bangor Daily News

Organizations

- End Citizens United
- EqualityMaine
- Human Rights Campaign
- J Street
- League of Conservation Voters
- Maine Education Association
- National Committee to Preserve Social Security and Medicare
- Planned Parenthood
- Population Connection
- Professional Firefighters of Maine
- Sierra Club

Media

- Bangor Daily News
- Kennebec Journal
- Portland Press Herald
Eric Brakey (R)

U.S. senators

- Ted Cruz, U.S. senator (R-TX)
- Rand Paul, U.S. senator (R-KY)

U.S. governors

- Paul LePage, governor of Maine

U.S. representatives

- Ron Paul, former congressman, presidential candidate in 2008 and 2012

State officials

- Rick Bennett, former Maine Senate president and Maine Republican Party chairman

Individuals

- Austin Petersen, candidate for U.S. Senate in Missouri in 2018 and Libertarian candidate for president in 2016
- Donald Trump Jr., businessman and son of U.S. President Donald Trump

Organizations

- NRA Political Victory Fund
Zak Ringelstein (D)

State senators

- Mark Dion, state senator, 2018 gubernatorial candidate in primary
- James Handy, state representative and former state senator
- John Patrick, former state senator

State representatives

- Robert Alley, state representative
- Harlan Baker, former state representative
- Dillon Bates, former state representative
- Henry John Bear, state representative
- Benjamin Collings, state representative
- Donna Doore, state representative
- Richard Farnsworth, state representative
- Scott Hamann, state representative
- Mark Lawrence, state representative
- Colleen Madigan, state representative
- Deane Rykerson, state representative
- Stephen Stanley, state representative
- Michael Sylvester, state representative

Other politicians

- Betsy Sweet, former director of the Maine Women's Lobby and 2018 candidate for governor

Other individuals

- Lawrence Lessig, professor, founder of Creative Commons
- Spose, rapper
- Cenk Uygur, journalist, co-founder of The Young Turks

Organizations

- Brand New Congress
- Demand Universal Healthcare
- Democratic Socialists of America
- Indivisible Lincoln County
- Local Berniecrats Maine
- Political Revolution
- Southern Maine Democratic Socialists of America
- Veterans for Bernie Sanders

Media

- Portland Phoenix

=== Predictions ===
Source	Ranking	As of
The Cook Political Report	Safe I	October 26, 2018
Inside Elections	Safe I	November 1, 2018
Sabato's Crystal Ball	Safe I	November 5, 2018
Fox News (Note: The Fox News Midterm Power Rankings uniquely does not contain a category for Safe/Solid races)	Likely I	November 5, 2018
CNN	Solid I	November 5, 2018
RealClearPolitics	Safe I	November 5, 2018

=== Polling ===
Poll source	Date(s) administered	Sample size	Margin of error	RCV round	Angus King (I)	Eric Brakey (R)	Zak Ringelstein (D)	Undecided
Emerson College	October 27–29, 2018	883	± 3.5%	Round 1	50%	37%	6%	7%
Critical Insights (R-Brakey)	October 8–16, 2018	600	± 3.9%	Round 1	41%	27%	7%	23%
Pan Atlantic Research	October 1–7, 2018	500	± 4.4%	Round 1	57%	30%	8%	5%
Self-Made Insights (R-Brakey)	September 27–30, 2018	750	± 3.4%	Round 1	47%	36%	8%	–
Suffolk University	August 2–6, 2018	500	± 4.4%	Round 1	52%	25%	9%	15%
Suffolk University	August 2–6, 2018	500	± 4.4%	Round 2	58%	27%	–	15%

Hypothetical polling

with Paul LePage

Poll source	Date(s) administered	Sample size	Margin of error	Angus King (I)	Paul LePage (R)	Other	Undecided
Colby College/Boston Globe	September 4–10, 2016	779	± 3.6%	59%	37%	–	4%
University of New Hampshire	June 15–21, 2016	467	± 4.5%	63%	29%	3%	5%

=== Results ===
United States Senate election in Maine, 2018
Party	Candidate	Votes	%	±%
Independent	Angus King (incumbent)	344,575	54.31%	+1.42%
Republican	Eric Brakey	223,502	35.23%	+4.48%
Democratic	Zak Ringelstein	66,268	10.45%	−2.81%
Write-in		64	0.01%	N/A
Total votes		634,409	100.00%	N/A
Independent hold				

==== By county ====
County	Angus King Independent		Eric Brakey Republican		Zak Ringelstein Democratic		Write-in		Blank votes		Margin		Total votes
County	#	%	#	%	#	%	#	%	#	%	#	%	Total votes
Androscoggin	22,150	48.01	18,931	41.03	4,316	9.35	12	0.03	730	1.58	3,219	6.98	46,139
Aroostook	14,742	52.46	10,767	38.31	1,822	6.48	3	0.01	768	2.73	3,975	14.15	28,102
Cumberland	93,860	59.82	40,053	25.53	20,262	12.92	5	0.00	768	1.73	53,807	34.29	156,893
Franklin	7,546	52.16	5,194	35.90	1,383	9.55	5	0.04	340	2.35	2,352	16.26	14,468
Hancock	15,463	53.85	9,837	34.26	2,969	10.54	8	0.03	439	1.53	5,626	19.59	28,716
Kennebec	29,640	51.91	21,608	37.84	4,837	8.47	3	0.01	1,010	1.77	8,032	14.07	57,098
Knox	12,009	57.39	6,270	29.96	2,234	10.68	3	0.01	409	1.96	5,739	27.43	20,925
Lincoln	10,763	55.40	6,814	35.07	1,592	8.19	0	0.00	260	1.34	3,949	20.33	19,429
Oxford	12,954	49.50	10,510	40.16	2,141	8.18	0	0.00	564	2.16	2,444	9.34	26,169
Penobscot	31,290	47.34	27,692	41.89	5,856	8.86	9	0.01	1,256	1.90	3,598	5.45	66,103
Piscataquis	3,379	44.26	3,578	46.87	534	7.00	3	0.04	140	1.83	-199	-2.61	7,634
Sagadahoc	11,473	58.71	6,284	32.16	1,507	7.71	0	0.00	279	1.43	5,189	26.55	19,543
Somerset	9,631	45.21	9,831	46.15	1,493	7.01	6	0.03	343	1.61	-200	-0.94	21,304
Waldo	10,503	52.30	7,265	36.17	1,976	9.84	3	0.02	337	1.68	3,238	16.13	20,084
Washington	6,310	46.92	5,770	42.90	1,097	8.16	4	0.03	269	2.00	540	4.02	13,450
York	51,387	52.66	32,849	33.66	11,551	11.84	0	0.00	1,798	1.84	18,538	19.00	97,585
Overseas	1,475	60.90	249	10.28	698	28.82	0	0.00	0	0.00	777	32.08	2,422
Totals	344,575	53.34	223,502	34.59	66,268	10.26	64	0.01	11,655	1.80	121,073	18.75	646,064

Counties that flipped from Independent to Republican

- Piscataquis (largest municipality: Dover-Foxcroft)
- Somerset (largest municipality: Skowhegan)

==== By congressional district ====
King won both congressional districts, which both elected Democrats.

District	King	Brakey	Ringelstein	Representative
1st	58%	30%	12%	Chellie Pingree
2nd	50%	41%	9%	Jared Golden

== See also ==
- United States Senate elections, 2018
- Maine gubernatorial election, 2018
