= 2019 Portland, Maine, mayoral election =

- November 5, 2019
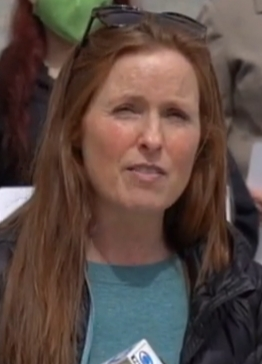

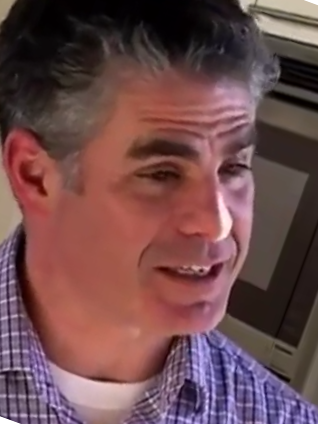
Candidate	Kate Snyder	Spencer Thibodeau
First round count	7,119; 39.33%	5,110; 28.23%
Final round count	10,460; 61.89%	6,442; 38.11%
Candidate	Ethan Strimling	Travis Curran
First round count	4,575; 25.28%	1,296; 7.16%
Final round count	Eliminated	Eliminated
Mayor before election
Ethan Strimling
Nonpartisan
Elected mayor
Kate Snyder
Nonpartisan

Portland, Maine, held an election for mayor on November 5, 2019. It was the third election to be held since Portland voters approved a citywide referendum changing the city charter to recreate an elected mayor position in 2010.

Kate Snyder, the newly citizen-elected mayor, won a four-year term in the full-time position, and will exercise the powers and duties enumerated in Article II Section 5 of the Portland City Charter. She was elected using ranked choice voting. With rest of the elected municipal government in Portland, the post is officially non-partisan. Incumbent Mayor Ethan Strimling running for re-election, was challenged by city councilor Spencer Thibodeau, former Portland School Board Chair Kate Snyder and East End resident Travis Curran.

Every candidate running for mayor in the heavily Democratic city was a registered member of the Maine Democratic Party.

== Candidates ==
=== Declared ===
- Travis Curran, waiter, East End resident
- Kate Snyder, nonprofit executive, former Chair of the Portland School Board, Oakdale resident
- Ethan Strimling, incumbent mayor, West End resident
- Spencer Thibodeau, real estate lawyer, City Councilor for District 2, Parkside resident

=== Failed to qualify for ballot ===
- Mark Hodgdon, Libbytown resident
- Ronald E. Gordius III, West Bayside resident
- Thaddeus St. John, businessman, Munjoy Hill resident

=== Withdrawn ===
- Justin Costa, City Councilor for District 4 and East Deering resident
- Belinda Ray, City Councilor for District 1 and East Bayside resident
- Joseph Bernatche, Riverton resident, Army veteran

== Campaign ==
=== Endorsements ===
Belinda Ray (withdrawn)

Individuals

- Jill Duson, Portland City Councilor, former Mayor of Portland
Kate Snyder

Individuals

- Kim Cook, Portland City Councilor
- Justin Costa, Portland City Councilor (also endorsed Thibodeau)
- John Spritz, Co-Founder, Back Cove Neighborhood Association

Media outlets

- Portland Press Herald
Ethan Strimling

Governors

- John Baldacci, Governor of Maine (2003–2011), member of the United States House of Representatives (1995–2003)

Mayors

- Alan Casavant, Mayor of Biddeford
- Bill de Blasio, Mayor of New York City, candidate for President in 2020
- Marston Lovell, Mayor of Saco
- Claude Morgan, Mayor of South Portland
- David Rollins, Mayor of Augusta
- Michael Sanphy, Mayor of Westbrook

State legislators

- Benjamin Collings, State Representative
- Annette Hoglund, former State Representative
- Christopher Kessler, State Representative
- Anne Rand, former State Senator
- John G. Richardson, former State Representative, former Speaker of the Maine House of Representatives
- Diane Russell, former State Representative, candidate for Governor of Maine in 2018
- Mike Sylvester, State Representative
- Gerald Talbot, former State Representative, first African-American elected official in Maine history
- Rachel Talbot Ross, State Representative
- Eliza Townsend, former State Representative
- Charlotte Warren, State Representative

Municipal officials

- Pious Ali, Portland City Councilor
- Marshall Archer, Saco City Councilor
- Tim Atkinson, Member of the Portland Board of Education
- Deqa Dhalac, South Portland City Councilor
- Emily Figdor, Member of the Portland Board of Education
- Thomas Kane, former Mayor of Portland (1998–1999)
- Micky Bondo M'bambi, Member of the Portland Board of Education
- Marianne Morrione, Member of the Portland Board of Education
- Roberto Rodriguez, Chair of the Portland Board of Education
- Nasir Shir, Member of the Cape Elizabeth School Board

Other individuals

- El Hadi Adam, President of the Sudanese Community of Portland
- Papy Bongibo, President of the Congolese Community of Portland
- Mark Dion, candidate for Governor of Maine in 2018, former State Representative, former State Senator, former Cumberland County Sheriff
- John Eder, former State Representative, former Portland Board of Education member
- Mahmoud Hassan, President of the Somali Community of Portland
- Nsiona Nguizani, President of the Angolan Community of Portland
- John Ochira, President of the South Sudanese Community of Portland
- Diane Russell, candidate for Governor of Maine in 2018, former State Representative
- Betsy Sweet, candidate for Governor of Maine in 2018 and candidate for US Senate in 2020

Organizations

- Maine People's Alliance
- Progressive Portland

Trade unions

- Communications Workers of America
- International Association of Bridge, Structural, Ornamental and Reinforcing Iron Workers
- International Association of Fire Fighters
- International Association of Heat and Frost Insulators and Allied Workers
- International Association of Machinists and Aerospace Workers
- International Association of Sheet Metal, Air, Rail and Transportation Workers
- International Brotherhood of Boilermakers, Iron Ship Builders, Blacksmiths, Forgers and Helpers
- International Brotherhood of Electrical Workers
- International Brotherhood of Teamsters
- International Longshoremen's Association
- International Union of Elevator Constructors
- International Union of Operating Engineers
- International Union of Painters and Allied Trades
- Laborers' International Union of North America
- Maine AFL–CIO
- Maine Lobstering Union
- Maine State Building and Trades Council
- Portland Education Association
- Southern Maine Labor Council
- United Association of Plumbers and Pipefitters
- United Brotherhood of Carpenters and Joiners of America
- United Steelworkers
- United Union of Roofers, Waterproofers and Allied Workers
Spencer Thibodeau

Former Portland mayors

- Michael F. Brennan, State Representative (1992–2000; 2018–present), former State Senator (2002–2006), former Mayor of Portland (2011–2015)
- Jim Cohen, former Mayor of Portland (2005–2006)
- Philip J. "Jack" Dawson, former Mayor of Portland (1986–1987; 1995–1996)
- Karen Geraghty, former Mayor of Portland (2001–2002)
- Cheryl Leeman, former Mayor of Portland (2000–2001)
- Pamela Plumb, former Mayor of Portland (1981–1982)
- Anne B. Pringle, former Mayor of Portland (1993–1994)
- Nathan Smith, former Mayor of Portland (2003–2004)

City councilors

- Brian Batson, Portland City Councilor
- Justin Costa, Portland City Councilor (also endorsed Snyder)
- Jill Duson, Portland City Councilor, former Mayor of Portland
- Nicholas Mavodones, Portland City Councilor, former Mayor of Portland
- Belinda Ray, Portland City Councilor

Other individuals

- Mark Balfantz, Member of the Portland Board of Education
- Richard Farnsworth, State Representative
- Anne Haskell, former State Senator
- Jon Hinck, former State Representative, former Portland City Councilor

Organizations

- Portland Police Benevolent Association

== Polling ==
Poll source	Date(s) administered	Sample size	Margin of error	Travis Curran	Kate Snyder	Ethan Strimling	Spencer Thibodeau
Change Research	October 4–6, 2019	347	±5%	5%	24%	29%	29%

== Results ==
The official election results were:

Portland, Maine mayoral election, 2019
Party	Candidate	Round 1			Round 2			Round 3	
Party	Candidate	Votes	%	Transfer	Votes	%	Transfer	Votes	%
Non-partisan	Kate Snyder	7,119	39.33%	+ 458	7,577	42.08%	+ 2,883	10,460	61.89%
Non-partisan	Spencer Thibodeau	5,110	28.23%	+ 164	5,274	29.29%	+ 1,168	6,442	38.11%
Non-partisan	Ethan Strimling	4,575	25.28%	+ 580	5,155	28.63%	5,155	Eliminated	
Non-partisan	Travis Curran	1,296	7.16%	1,296	Eliminated				
Total votes								16,902	100.0%
