= Edward Suslovic =

American politician

Ed Suslovic

District 3 City Councilor, Portland, Maine
- In office December 6, 2010 – December 5, 2016
- Preceded by: Dan Skolnik
- Succeeded by: Brian Batson

Mayor of Portland, Maine
- In office December 3, 2007 – December 6, 2008
- Preceded by: Nicholas Mavodones Jr.
- Succeeded by: Jill Duson

At-Large City Councilor, Portland, Maine
- In office December 6, 2005 – December 6, 2008
- Preceded by: Peter O’Donnell
- Succeeded by: Dory Waxman

Member of the Maine House of Representatives from the 32nd district
- In office 2002–2004
- Preceded by: John F. McDonough
- Succeeded by: John Eder

Personal details
- Born: November 17, 1959 (age 66) Methuen, Massachusetts
- Party: Democratic
- Spouse: Jennifer Southard
- Children: Kate; Meghan; Matt
- Education: Phillips Academy; Wesleyan University

Edward J. Suslovic (born November 17, 1959) is an American politician and former member of the Portland City Council in Maine. Suslovic, a Democrat, previously represented part of Portland in the Maine House of Representatives from 2002 to 2004 and served as the ceremonial mayor of Portland from 2007 to 2008.

== Education and State Legislature ==
Suslovic, born in Methuen, Massachusetts, in 1959, attended Phillips Academy and proceeded to earn a bachelor's degree from Wesleyan University, where he majored in government. In 2002, Suslovic ran and defeated incumbent John F. McDonough for the Democratic nomination for District 32 in the Maine House of Representatives. McDonough registered as a Republican after his defeat and was nominated by Maine Republicans as a replacement, only to be defeated by Suslovic again in the 2002 general election. Suslovic served on the State and Local Government, Taxation, Joint Select Committee on Regionalization and Community Cooperation committees during his two years in the House of Representatives.

In the 2004 general election Suslovic was defeated for re-election by Green Independent and fellow incumbent John Eder following a controversial redistricting process which involved a lawsuit by the Green Independent Party claiming the Democrats sought to gerrymander Eder out of office. The lawsuit was unsuccessful and Eder moved across Portland's West End to stay in district.

== Election to City Council ==
In 2005, Suslovic was elected to the Portland's City Council and served as the ceremonial mayor from 2007 to 2008. During his term on the council, a discussion arose regarding plans to redevelop the Maine State Pier on Commercial Street on Portland's Waterfront. The majority of Suslovic's fellow Democrats supported a plan by Ocean Properties, which was strongly allied with Maine's Governor John Baldacci. However, Suslovic sided with the three Green Independents and one Republican on the council and backed the plan by the Olympia Companies.

In a competitive, four-way race in 2008, former Ocean Properties employee Dory Waxman defeated Suslovic's bid to return to the City Council.

== Return to City Council and current work ==
In 2010, Suslovic sought to return to the Portland City Council, entering the race for the District 3 seat. Suslovic's opponent was Will Mitchell, the son of 2010 Democratic gubernatorial nominee Libby Mitchell. Despite Mitchell receiving the endorsements of multiple City Councilors, Suslovic won the election with 58% of the vote and returned to the City Council for another three-year term.

During his term on the City Council, Suslovic has worked on a variety of issues, including improving public transportation in Portland, increasing environmentally sustainable practices in area schools and businesses, and advocating for gun control laws that keep firearms from falling in the wrong hands. As a member of the executive committee and Recycling Committee of ecoMaine, Suslovic traveled to Arkhangelsk, Russia, a sister city of Portland, as part of an environmental action team to share best practices and discuss with city officials how to solve solid waste management issues. Suslovic has also led the efforts to encourage composting in Portland's public schools and chairs the Green Packaging Working Group, which is tasked with developing an ordinance to ban the use of containers made from polystyrene foam and to identify ways to reduce the use of plastic bags.

Suslovic has worked to advance public transportation in the Southern Maine region through his work as vice-president of the Board of Directors of the Greater Portland Transit District (Metro). Suslovic has worked to improve public transportation in Portland and has also advocated for continuing the funding of public transportation in nearby communities in order to support a regional economy.

A board member of Maine Citizens Against Handgun Violence, Suslovic has advocated for local municipalities to have the flexibility to craft gun laws that are more strict than state statutes. Suslovic has advocated for enact ordinances that prohibit weapons in public buildings and at public gatherings.

Suslovic endorsed Eliot Cutler in the 2014 gubernatorial election.

In the 2016 election, Suslovic faced a challenge from 25-year-old political newcomer Brian Batson. Suslovic lost to Batson 3,561 to 3,219.

== Personal life ==
Suslovic lives with his wife, Jennifer Southard, and three children in Portland's Oakdale neighborhood.
