= Charles Harlow =

American politician (1942–2020)

Charles W. Harlow

Member of the Maine House of Representatives for the 116th District
- In office December 2004 – December 2010
- Succeeded by: Denise Harlow

Personal details
- Born: May 25, 1942 Rumford, Maine
- Died: March 28, 2020 (aged 77)
- Party: Democratic
- Children: Denise Harlow, daughter
- Education: University of Maine
- Profession: Teacher

Charles W. Harlow (May 25, 1942 – March 28, 2020) was an American politician from Maine. He served on the Portland, Maine City Council from 1990 to 1999, including a term as ceremonial mayor from 1992 to 1993. In 2004, Harlow was elected as a Democrat to the Maine House of Representatives from District 116. He served until 2010, when he was succeeded by his daughter, Denise Harlow, who served from 2010 to 2018.

== Personal ==
Harlow was born on May 25, 1942, in Rumford, Maine. He graduated from the University of Maine in 1965 with a B.S. He earned a Master's of Education from Maine three years later. A career educator, Harlow taught at Wells High School, Mexico High School, Mount Blue High School and, from 1972 until his retirement in 2004, at Cheverus High School in Portland.

After leaving office, Harlow suffered from dementia and was reported missing in October 2013. A search of the Riverside Industrial Park resulted in his being found inside a bakery. He died in 2020 at age 77.
