= Mark Dion =

Mark Dion may refer to:

- Mark Dion (artist) (born 1961), American conceptual artist
- Mark Dion (politician) (born 1955), American politician
