= Portland City Council =

Portland City Council may refer to:

- The city council of Portland, Maine
- The city council of Portland, Oregon
