= Henry Bear =

Henry Bear may refer to:

- Henry John Bear (born 1956), Native American politician from Maine
- Henry Standing Bear (c. 1874–1953), Oglala Lakota chief
- Henry Standing Bear, a character in the TV series Longmire
