= Kate Snyder =

Non-profit executive and politician from Maine, USA

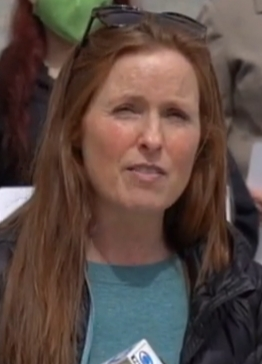

89th Mayor of Portland
- In office December 2, 2019 – December 4, 2023
- Preceded by: Ethan Strimling
- Succeeded by: Mark Dion

Personal details
- Born: 1970 (age 55–56)
- Party: Democratic
- Children: 3
- Education: Skidmore College (BA); University of Southern Maine (MPP)
- Website: Campaign website

Kathleen Merchant Snyder (born 1970) is an American politician who served as Mayor of Portland, Maine from 2019 until 2023. Prior to her election as mayor, she served as executive director of the Portland Education Foundation, a non-profit which raised funds for Portland Public Schools.

Snyder also served on the Portland Board of Education from 2007-2013, including time as chair. From 2009 to 2011, Snyder served as an executive director of the Maine Department of Corrections.

In the 2019 Portland, Maine mayoral election. Snyder defeated incumbent Ethan Strimling and two other challengers, winning each of the city's 12 districts and earning 62% of the overall vote.

In September 2022, Snyder announced that she would not seek re-election to a second term in office in 2023.

== Campaign ==
During her campaign for mayor, Snyder emphasized her skills as a collaborative leader and consensus builder, someone focused on putting public service ahead of personal ambition. On October 17, 2019, she received the endorsement of the Portland Press Herald, which pointed to what they described as her record of fiscal responsibility and strong communication while serving on the School Board during the Great Recession and underscored the need for change in Portland city leadership, which had been characterized by ongoing tension between the sitting mayor, city councilors, and the City Manager. She was viewed as an ally of city manager Jon Jennings, "whose vocal opposition to Strimling's re-election all but functioned as an endorsement of his most competitive challengers." Among her policies, she opposed a $15 municipal minimum wage, supported the elimination of fares "for the city's METRO bus system for middle-and high school students," and sought to give long-term leases of city property to housing developers committed to building affordable housing.

== Mayor ==
=== 2020 Democratic Primary ===
When former New York City mayor and billionaire businessman Michael Bloomberg campaigned in Portland in January 2020 during the 2020 Democratic primary, Snyder was among those he spoke with during a campaign stop at Becky's Diner. It was unclear whether this meeting was an official endorsement.

=== 2020 Black Lives Matter protests ===
In June 2020 Portland Black Lives Matter activists released demands after days of protesting including the dismissal of city manager Jon Jennings, to which Snyder responded by declaring "The city manager has my full support." In June 2020 Snyder sought permission from the city council to allow private citizens to paint a Black Lives Matter mural in front of Portland City Hall. In September, Snyder appointed 13 members to a Racial Equity Steering Committee.

=== Minimum wage ===
In 2020, Snyder opposed a local ballot question that would raise Portland’s minimum wage to $15 an hour, arguing that it would be devastating for small businesses and employees in the city. The measure, put forth by People First Portland, which also included time-and-a-half hazard pay for those who must work during a state of emergency, was passed by voters.

=== Policing ===
Snyder opposed a 2020 ballot question that aimed to strengthen the ban on the use of facial recognition technology by law enforcement in Portland. Despite Mayor Snyder's criticism, 66% of Portland voters supported this measure, which added concrete penalties to violations of the ban.

During the summer of 2020, amid the nationwide protests against police brutality, shots were fired into the parking garage of the Portland Police Department. Although nobody was hurt and the motive for the shooting was unclear, Snyder quickly issued a statement to express her gratitude for local law enforcement, urged the community to protest peacefully rather than violently, and vowed to continue to listen and learn from the community.

Snyder, who opted not to run for a second term, endorsed former sheriff Mark Dion as her first choice in the 2023 mayoral race. Dion, who was a sitting Portland city councilor at the time, previously spent 21 years with the Portland Police Department in addition to 12 years as the Cumberland County Sheriff.

=== Housing ===
While on the campaign trail during her mayoral bid, Snyder expressed a desire to further regulate short-term rentals like AirBnb and cautioned residents against vilifying housing developers. After being sworn into office in December of 2019, Snyder emphasized housing affordability as her number one issue. Despite these campaign promises, Snyder spoke out against local referendums that aimed to protect tenants by capping annual rent increases as well as restrict short-term rentals in the 2020 election season.

=== Armenia and Azerbaijan ===
In early 2021, Snyder signed a proclamation, drafted by Tarlan Ahmadov, that acknowledged February 26 as Khojaly Remembrance Day. Ahmadov, who at the time worked as the refugee coordinator for Catholic Charities and had emigrated from Azerbaijan to Maine twenty years prior, claimed that the resolution was not politically motivated. However, the measure was met with swift criticism from some members of Maine’s Armenian community, who described it as propaganda designed to downplay the ethnic cleansing of more than one million Armenians by Turkey in the early 20th century. Although Snyder felt “terrible” when confronted with the backlash, she initially refused to rescind the proclamation, instead indicating that she would look for a way to recognize the Armenian genocide. Several weeks later, on April 1, Snyder changed course and rescinded the proclamation, removing it from the public record, which was described as “heart-breaking” by Ahmadov. On April 24, Snyder attended a ceremony to remember the lives of those lost in the Armenian Genocide, which was held in Portland’s Bayside neighborhood.

=== LGBTQ Rights ===
In January 2021, after many Portland residents received threatening, homophobic letters, Snyder joined the city council in urging residents to fly the Pride flag.

== Personal life ==
Snyder earned her B.A. from Skidmore College in New York and a M.A. in public policy and management from the Muskie School at the University of Southern Maine as well as a Certificate of Graduate Studies in Applied Research and Evaluation Methods. She is married, lives in the city's Oakdale neighborhood, and has 3 children who were educated in the Portland Public Schools system.

Political offices
Preceded by Ethan Strimling	Mayor of Portland; 2019–2023	Succeeded by Mark Dion
