= 2023 Portland, Maine mayoral election =

- November 7, 2023
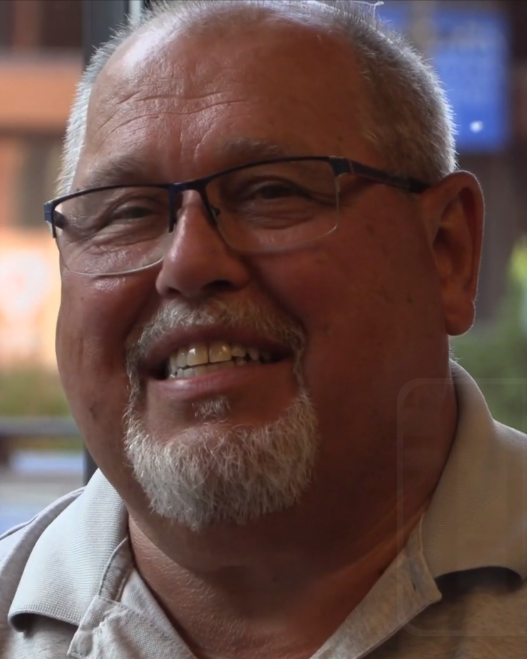

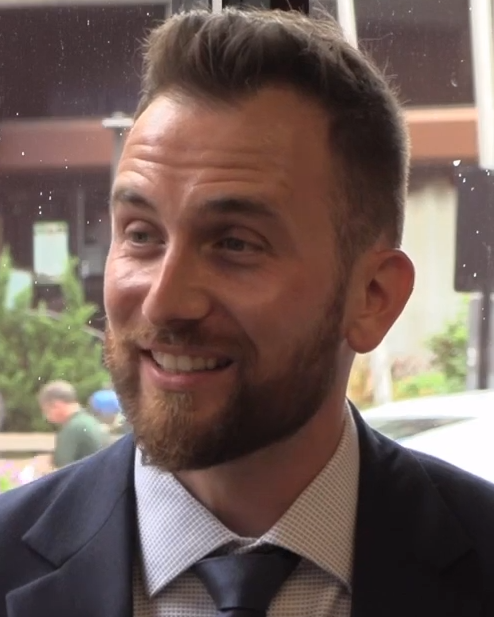

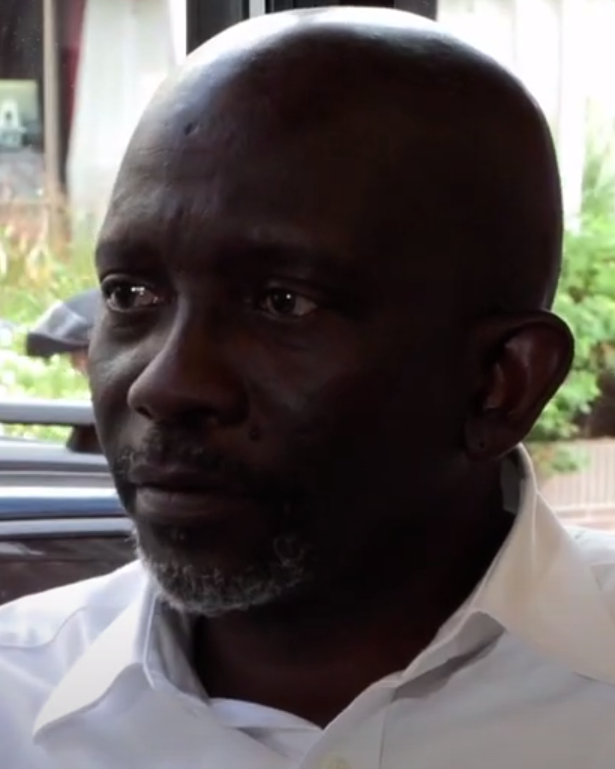

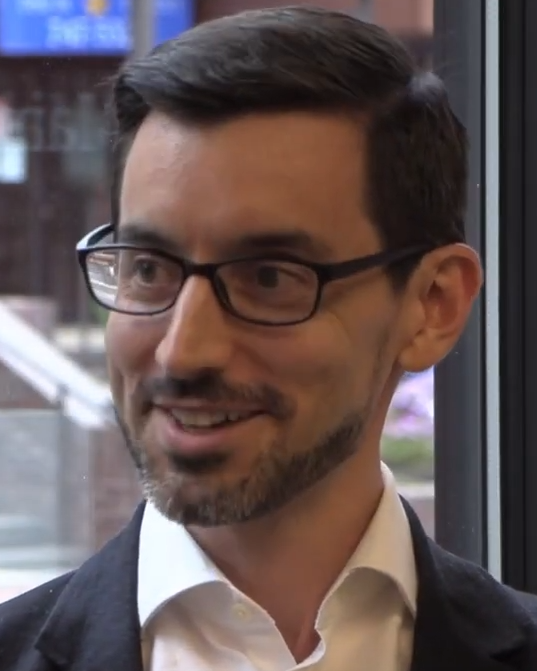
Candidate	Mark Dion	Andrew Zarro
First round	8,839; 39.43%	5,902; 26.33%
Final round	10,750; 51.55%	10,107; 48.45%
Candidate	Pious Ali	Justin Costa
First round	4,894; 21.83%	1,771; 7.90%
Final round	Eliminated	Eliminated
Mayor before election
Kate Snyder
Elected mayor
Mark Dion

The 2023 Portland, Maine mayoral election was held on November 7, 2023, to elect the mayor of Portland, Maine.

Since 1923, municipal elections in Portland have not included formal partisan nominations. In September 2022, Mayor Kate Snyder announced that she would not seek re-election to a second term in office. Mark Dion was elected mayor after five rounds of voting.

== Background ==
Since 2011, all mayoral elections in Portland have used instant-runoff voting, a form of ranked-choice voting.

Nomination papers for the mayor, city council, and school board were available on June 30 and had to be returned between August 14 and August 28.

== Candidates ==
=== Official ===
- Pious Ali, at-large city councilor
- Justin Costa, former city councilor
- Mark Dion, city councilor, former state senator, former Cumberland County Sheriff, and candidate for governor in 2018 (Party affiliation: Democratic)
- Dylan Pugh, software developer (Party affiliation: Democratic)
- Andrew Zarro, city councilor, District 4 (Party affiliation: Democratic)

=== Declined ===
- Emily Figdor, member and former chair of the Portland Board of Education
- Michael Kebede, former chair of the Portland Charter Commission
- Kate Snyder, incumbent mayor (Party affiliation: Democratic)
- Ethan Strimling, former mayor (Party affiliation: Democratic)

==== Endorsements ====
Pious Ali

Local officials

- Ethan Strimling, former mayor (2015–2019)
Mark Dion

Local officials

- Kate Snyder, incumbent mayor (2019–present) (first choice)
Andrew Zarro

Local officials

- Kate Snyder, incumbent mayor (2019–present) (second choice)

== Campaign ==
The major issues in the mayoral campaign included the ongoing housing crisis and homelessness crisis in the city. The 2023 point-in-time count noted 4,258 unhoused individuals, 25% of which were considered chronically homeless.

Another issue discussed on the campaign trail was a rise in hate speech. Ali faced threats and harassment from the New England White Network, City Council meetings faced zoom bombing, and anti-semitic flyers were placed around the community on September 11.

== Results ==
2023 Portland, Maine mayoral election
Candidate	Round 1			Round 2			Round 3			Round 4			Round 5	
Candidate	Votes	%	Transfer	Votes	%	Transfer	Votes	%	Transfer	Votes	%	Transfer	Votes	%
Mark Dion	8,839	39.43%	+ 10	8,849	39.50%	+ 60	8,909	39.88%	+ 516	9,425	42.56%	+ 1,325	10,750	51.55%
Andrew Zarro	5,902	26.33%	+ 26	5,928	26.46%	+ 363	6,291	28.16%	+ 636	6,927	31.28%	+ 3,180	10,107	48.45%
Pious Ali	4,894	21.83%	+ 23	4,917	21.95%	+ 362	5,279	23.63%	+ 515	5,794	26.16%	5,794	Eliminated	
Justin Costa	1,771	7.90%	+ 4	1,775	7.92%	+ 86	1,861	8.33%	1,861	Eliminated				
Dylan Pugh	908	4.05%	+ 26	934	4.17%	934	Eliminated							
George Rheault (Write-in)	100	0.45%	100	Eliminated										
Total votes													22,414	100.0%
