= Joan Cohen =

American attorney and politician

Member of the Maine House of Representatives for the 113th District
- In office December 3, 2008 – December 2010
- Preceded by: John Brautigam
- Succeeded by: Mark Dion

Personal details
- Born: November 2, 1962 (age 63) Chicago, Illinois, U.S.
- Party: Democratic
- Education: University of Illinois at Urbana–Champaign; University of Virginia School of Law
- Profession: Attorney

Joan F. Cohen (born November 2, 1962) is an American attorney and politician. Cohen, a Democrat, served a single two-year term in the Maine House of Representatives from District 113, which included the North Deering neighborhood in Portland as well as a portion of adjacent Falmouth. She earned a bachelor's degree in History for the University of Illinois at Urbana–Champaign (1986) and a J.D. degree from the University of Virginia School of Law (1989). She is married to former Portland Mayor Jim Cohen.

== Career ==
From 1989 to 2000, Cohen practiced law in a variety of ways; she worked as a corporate real estate attorney for Winthrop, Stimson, Putnam & Roberts, served as assistant general counsel to the Maine State Chamber of Commerce (1992–94), general counsel for the Maine Medical Association (1994–98), and owned her own practice (1998-2000).

== Political positions ==
At the time of her election, Cohen favored more restrictions on firearm ownership and was on the board of Maine Citizens Against Handgun Violence. She supported a statewide ban on smoking on bar and restaurant patios and decks, the implementation of a limited local option sales tax, and opposed the teaching of intelligent design in public schools. Cohen, who is Jewish, served on the board of the Jewish Community Alliance and sponsored a joint resolution commemorating the Holocaust.
