= Joel Abromson =

American politician

I. Joel Abromson

Member of the Maine State Senate for the 27th District
- In office December 1994 – January 14, 2002
- Succeeded by: Michael F. Brennan

Personal details
- Born: August 15, 1938
- Died: January 14, 2002 (aged 63)
- Party: Republican
- Spouse: Linda Abromson

I. Joel Abromson (August 15, 1938 – January 14, 2002) was an American politician in Maine. Abromson was a Republican State Senator representing Falmouth, Long Island and part of Portland (District 27). Considered a liberal on social issues and a conservative on fiscal issues, he sponsored legislation to prevent discrimination on the basis of sexual orientation. When he died in January 2002, the Maine Lesbian Gay Political Alliance called Abromson a "champion and a true friend". His final day in the legislature was in December 2001, when he voted to confirm Leigh Saufley as the new Chief Justice of the Maine Supreme Judicial Court.

Prominent in the state's Jewish community, Abromson's wife, Linda Abromson, was a member of the Portland City Council and the first Jewish woman to hold the largely ceremonial position of Mayor. The Joel and Linda Abromson Community Education Center, which is located on the Portland campus of the University of Southern Maine, is named in their honor

At the time of Abromson's death from liver cancer, the Maine Senate was evenly split between Republicans and Democrats, with one unenrolled (independent) senator as well. His death gave the Democrats a 17–16 advantage, though Republican Rick Bennett maintained his position as President of the Maine Senate due to a power-sharing agreement. State Representative Michael F. Brennan narrowly won a special election to replace Abromson.
