= David Slagger =

American politician

Member of the Maine House of Representatives
- In office January 4, 2012 – December 2012
- Succeeded by: Henry John Bear

Personal details
- Born: June 22, 1962 (age 64) Bangor, Maine
- Party: Unenrolled
- Spouse: Wilhilmina Slagger
- Education: University of Maine
- Profession: Public Relations

David Slagger (born June 22, 1962) is a Maliseet politician in Maine. Slagger served as a member of the Maine House of Representatives, representing the newly recognized Maliseet Tribe. Slagger was sworn in as the appointed representative to the House of Representatives on January 4, 2012. He held the seat temporarily until a tribal election could be conducted to elect a Maliseet Tribal Representative, which the Maliseet Tribe then did on December 22, 2012, when tribal members elected Henry John Bear as their first elected Tribal Representative to the Maine House of Representatives. Slagger did not seek another term as Maliseet representative.

Slagger was one of three non-voting representatives from Maine's Native American tribes in the House of Representatives. Representatives from each tribe are all elected by tribal members.

Slagger did not seek another term as the Maliseet representative due to the limitations placed on tribal representatives, including the inability to vote and sponsor bills without co-sponsors. Slagger was humiliated when, during a tie vote in the Labor, Commerce, Research and Economic Development Committee on which he sat, Slagger's deciding vote was recorded but cast aside by the committee chair. In May 2012, Slagger announced a bid for the non-tribal seat in which he lived, District 22. Still running as a non-party (independent) candidate, he challenged incumbent Republican incumbent Stacy Guerin with no Democrat in the race. He received 1,299 votes (26%) and lost.

== Gubernatorial campaign ==
In February 2013, Slagger formed a campaign committee to run for Governor of Maine in 2014 as a Democrat. In April, Slagger enrolled as a Green Independent and began seeking the Maine Green Independent Party's nomination. Shortly thereafter, Slagger unenrolled as a Green Independent and continued his run as an unenrolled candidate for Governor. Slagger did not qualify for the November 2014 ballot as an independent.

== Personal ==
Slagger grew up in Aroostook County, Maine and lives in Kenduskeag in Penobscot County with his wife (a Mi'kmaq) and their three children. In September 2005, Slagger, a non-traditional undergraduate at the University of Maine, was awarded an internship at the Smithsonian Institution's National Museum of the American Indian in Washington, D.C. At the time of his swearing-in in 2012, Slagger was a doctoral candidate at the University of Maine.
