= Patrick Paradis =

American politician

Patrick Paradis (born August 23, 1953, in Augusta, Maine) is an American politician.

Paradis was born in Augusta, and attended St. Augustine Parish school from first through eighth grade. Later he graduated from a Roman Catholic parochial high school in Bucksport, Maine. He attended Framingham State College and graduated with a bachelor's degree after four years.

A former Maine legislator, he served in the Maine House of Representatives for eight terms (16 years), and served as the majority whip during the 116th Legislature from 1992 to 1994. During this time, he taught a course at the University of Maine at Augusta.

He was the Kennebec County Treasurer for 8 years. Paradis was the Interim Mayor of Augusta, Maine, the capital city of the state, for 3 months until giving up his seat to David Rollins, the second Interim Mayor, who served another 3 months. He is currently on the Augusta City Council, elected in 2008 now serving his second 3-year term. His second term is set to expire in December 2013. Paradis was inducted into the Franco-American Hall of Fame on March 17, 2011, by Paul LePage, the state governor.
