= 2011 Portland, Maine, mayoral election =

- November 8, 2011
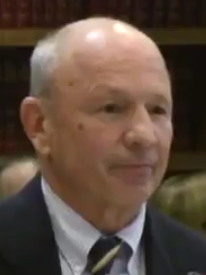

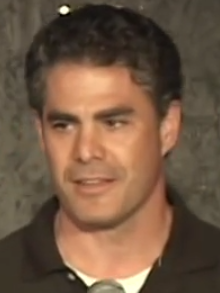

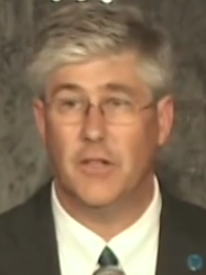

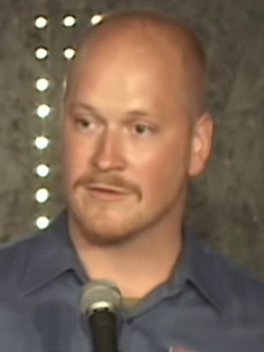

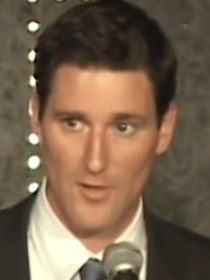
| Candidate | Michael F. Brennan | Ethan Strimling | Nicholas Mavodones |
| First round vote | 5,211 | 4,392 | 2,931 |
| First round percentage | 25.5% | 22.3% | 14.9% |
| Final round vote | 8,971 | 7,138 | Eliminated |
| Final round percentage | 55.7% | 44.3% | Eliminated |
| Candidate | David Marshall | Jed Rathband |
| First round vote | 1,506 | 1,393 |
| First round percentage | 7.6% | 7.0% |
| Final round vote | Eliminated | Eliminated |
| Final round percentage | Eliminated | Eliminated |
Mayor before election
Nicholas Mavodones
Elected mayor
Michael F. Brennan

Portland, Maine, held an election for mayor on November 8, 2011.

In November 2010, Portland voters approved a citywide referendum changing the city charter to recreate an elected mayor position that had previously been removed in 1923. From 1923 until 2011, city councilors chose one of themselves each year to serve as mayor, a primarily ceremonial position. On November 8, 2011, former State Senator and candidate for U.S. Congress Michael F. Brennan was elected. On December 5, 2011, he was sworn in as the first citizen-elected mayor in 88 years.

The new citizen-elected mayor serves full-time in the position for a four-year term, exercises the powers and duties enumerated in Article II Section 5 of the Portland City Charter, be elected using instant-runoff voting, and, like the rest of municipal government in Portland, be officially non-partisan.

== Ballot access ==
The declared candidates filed paperwork with city hall to allow them to raise funds for their campaigns. The nomination papers became available on July 1 and the candidates were required to submit at least 300 valid signatures of Portland voters between August 15 and August 29 to be placed on the November ballot. As of the August 29 deadline, 16 candidates submitted their nomination petitions, and 15 petitions were validated: Bragdon, Brennan, Bryant, Carmona, Dodge, Duson, Eder, Haadoow, Lapchick, Marshall, Mavodones, Miller, Rathband, Strimling, and Vail. Bennett fell five signatures short of the required 300.

== Race ==
As of July 4, Christopher Vail was invalidated by city attorney Gary Wood from running due to his employment by the city as a firefighter but this was overturned shortly thereafter. As of July 8, Zouhair Bouzrara was in court facing charges after allegedly drinking alcohol, a violation of parole given to him a year early after being accused of threatening to kill a co-worker in July 2010. Bouzrara withdrew during the petitioning process.

== Endorsements ==
On September 27, David Marshall was endorsed by the Maine League of Young Voters. On October 11, Portland Tomorrow, a group made up of some former charter commissioners and other supporters of the elected mayor referendum, endorsed Michael Brennan. On the same day, the Portland Education Association endorsed Nick Mavodones. On October 17, the Portland Press Herald endorsed Michael Brennan. On October 26, Jed Rathband received the sole endorsement from the Portland Regional Chamber of Commerce Political Action Committee. On November 1, Ethan Strimling received the endorsement of John Eder. On November 1, David Marshall received the endorsement of Maine Green Independent Party. On November 1, Nicholas Mavodones received the endorsements of Carpenters Local 1996 and AFSCME Local 481. On November 5, The Portland Daily Sun endorsed Michael Brennan.

| CANDIDATE | Maine League of Young Voters | Portland Regional Chamber of Commerce PAC | Portland Ed. Assn. | Portland Tomorrow | Portland Press Herald | Portland Daily Sun | Maine Green Ind. Party | Carpenters Local 1996 | AFSCME Local 481 |
|---|---|---|---|---|---|---|---|---|---|
| Charles Bragdon | | | | | | | | | |
| Michael Brennan | #2 | | #2 | #1 | #1 | #1 | | | |
| Peter Bryant | | | | | | | | | |
| Ralph Carmona | | | | | | | | | |
| Richard Dodge | | | | | | | | | |
| Jill Duson | | | | | | | | | |
| John Eder | #3 | | | | | | | | |
| Hamza Haadoow | | | | | | | | | |
| Jodie Lapchick | | | | | | | | | |
| David Marshall | #1 | | | | | #4 | #1 | | |
| Nicholas Mavodones | | | #1 | | | #2 | | #1 | #1 |
| Markos Miller | #4 | | #3 | | | #3 | | | |
| Jed Rathband | #5 | #1 | | | | | | | |
| Ethan Strimling | | | #4 | | | | | | |
| Christopher Vail | | | | | | | | | |

== Candidates ==
=== On the ballot ===
- Charles Bragdon, Munjoy Hill resident, perennial municipal candidate & taxi-driver. Bragdon has run for office as a Democrat, Green and unenrolled.
- Michael Brennan, Back Cove resident, former State Representative, former State Senator, unsuccessful candidate for the Democratic nomination for the U.S. Congress in 2008, Co-chair of the National Board of Advisors of Casey Family Services, former adjunct faculty member at the University of New England, and currently works as a policy associate at the Muskie School of Public Service at the University of Southern Maine.
- Peter Bryant, Back Cove resident, retired merchant seaman and former U.S. Marine
- Ralph Carmona, Munjoy Hill resident, resident of Portland for under one year, former Bank of America executive and California lobbyist
- Richard Dodge, Riverton resident, Republican, commercial real estate broker
- Jill Duson, North Deering resident, retired lawyer, former ceremonial mayor, at-large City Councillor and three time delegate to the Democratic Party National Convention, former Maine lobbyist
- John Eder, West End resident, former state legislator with the Maine Green Independent Party
- Hamza Haadoow, East Deering resident, Somalia native and small business owner.
- Jodie Lapchick, West End resident & marketing consultant
- David Marshall, West End resident, Maine Green Independent Party affiliated fine artist and City Councilor for the West End, downtown and Parkside neighborhoods (District 2). Marshall was the first sitting city council member to declare his candidacy in March 2011.
- Nicholas Mavodones, Back Cove resident, Democrat, current ceremonial mayor and at-large City Councillor, opposed charter change to elected mayor
- Markos Miller, Munjoy Hill resident, Served as co-chair of the Franklin Street Arterial Study Committee and teaches at Deering High School.
- Jed Rathband, East Bayside resident, professional PR consultant, ran the committee that campaigned for the elected mayor in 2010, worked for the now defunct Maine Green Energy Alliance, former Maine lobbyist, former PR consultant for the Olympia Companies on Maine State Pier proposal
- Ethan Strimling, West End resident, former State Senator with the Democratic Party, unsuccessful candidate for Portland City Council and for his party's nomination for the United States Congress in 2008
- Christopher Vail, North Deering resident, Portland firefighter

=== Write-in ===
- Erick Bennett, Parkside resident, Republican blogger and campaign media aide to Governor Paul LePage, submitted nomination papers with insufficient valid signatures, announced Write-in candidacy on August 30 pending request of petition recount with Portland City Clerk's office

== Withdrawn/Failed ==
- Nicholas Hall, failed to submit nomination papers
- Robert Higgins, failed to submit nomination papers
- Steve Huston, homeless activist who announced candidacy but never picked up petitions
- Paul Schafer, failed to submit nomination papers
- Jay York

== Results ==
Portland, Maine mayoral election, 2011
| Party | Candidate | FPv% | Count | | | | | | | | | | | | | | |
| Party | Candidate | FPv% | 1 | 2 | 3 | 4 | 5 | 6 | 7 | 8 | 9 | 10 | 11 | 12 | 13 | 14 | 15 |
|---|---|---|---|---|---|---|---|---|---|---|---|---|---|---|---|---|---|
| Nonpartisan | Michael Brennan | 26.5 | 5,211 | 5,214 | 5,228 | 5,251 | 5,307 | 5,362 | 5,455 | 5,508 | 5,578 | 5,652 | 5,858 | 6,107 | 6,537 | 7,515 | 8,971 |
| Nonpartisan | Ethan Strimling | 22.3 | 4,392 | 4,399 | 4,406 | 4,435 | 4,452 | 4,505 | 4,554 | 4,601 | 4,674 | 4,754 | 4,859 | 5,072 | 5,472 | 5,934 | 7,138 |
| Nonpartisan | Nicholas Mavodones | 14.9 | 2,941 | 2,947 | 2,957 | 2,968 | 2,984 | 2,998 | 3,023 | 3,072 | 3,124 | 3,237 | 3,303 | 3,504 | 3,793 | 4,075 | |
| Nonpartisan | David Marshall | 7.6 | 1,506 | 1,507 | 1,526 | 1,542 | 1,548 | 1,616 | 1,636 | 1,653 | 1,677 | 1,717 | 1,894 | 2,002 | 2,306 | | |
| Nonpartisan | Jed Rathband | 7.0 | 1,393 | 1,394 | 1,405 | 1,411 | 1,423 | 1,444 | 1,465 | 1,495 | 1,530 | 1,623 | 1,745 | 1,807 | | | |
| Nonpartisan | Jill Duson | 4.2 | 839 | 840 | 858 | 867 | 879 | 898 | 922 | 948 | 960 | 989 | 1,049 | | | | |
| Nonpartisan | Markos Miller | 3.6 | 717 | 718 | 721 | 727 | 731 | 748 | 766 | 775 | 815 | 856 | | | | | |
| Nonpartisan | Richard Dodge | 3.3 | 662 | 666 | 667 | 667 | 675 | 680 | 691 | 740 | 789 | | | | | | |
| Nonpartisan | Christopher Vail | 2.0 | 403 | 407 | 416 | 417 | 425 | 429 | 440 | 460 | | | | | | | |
| Nonpartisan | Peter Bryant | 1.8 | 366 | 367 | 371 | 373 | 385 | 392 | 403 | | | | | | | | |
| Nonpartisan | Ralph Carmona | 1.6 | 316 | 317 | 320 | 324 | 339 | 344 | | | | | | | | | |
| Nonpartisan | John Eder | 1.3 | 274 | 275 | 278 | 291 | 298 | | | | | | | | | | |
| Nonpartisan | Charles Bragdon | 1.1 | 218 | 220 | 223 | 226 | | | | | | | | | | | |
| Nonpartisan | Hamza Haadoow | 0.9 | 185 | 187 | 192 | | | | | | | | | | | | |
| Nonpartisan | Jodie Lapchick | 0.6 | 130 | 130 | | | | | | | | | | | | | |
| Nonpartisan | Write-in | 0.4 | 81 | | | | | | | | | | | | | | |
Valid: 19,634 Spoilt: 578 Turnout: 20,212

== See also ==
- List of mayors of Portland, Maine
