= Jon Hinck =

American politician

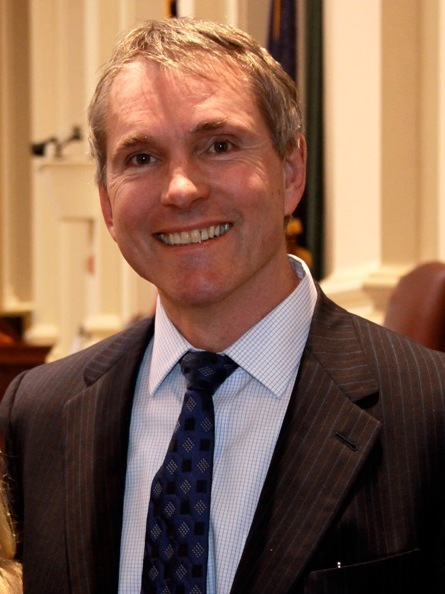

Member of the Maine House of Representatives from the 118th district
- In office December 1, 2006 – December 5, 2012
- Preceded by: John Eder
- Succeeded by: Matt Moonen

Personal details
- Born: January 9, 1954 (age 72) Sacramento, California, U.S.
- Party: Democratic
- Spouse: Juliet Browne
- Children: 1
- Occupation: Attorney

Jon Hinck (born January 9, 1954) is an American environmentalist, lawyer and politician. From 2006 to 2012 he served as a member of the Maine House of Representatives, representing House District 118, part of Portland, Maine. From 2013 through 2016, Hinck held an at-large seat on the Portland, Maine City Council.

== Early life, education, and law career ==
Hinck was born in Sacramento, California, and spent most of his childhood in the Liberty Corner section of Bernards Township, New Jersey and also lived in Bernardsville, New Jersey. He was an honor student, an Eagle Scout and a varsity athlete. After graduating from Bernards High School in 1972, he worked his way through the University of Pennsylvania as a taxicab driver, projectionist and theater usher. He graduated with a dual major in English and History. While an undergraduate, he co-founded a jazz club called the New Foxhole Café in West Philadelphia. In 1976, Hinck spent six months teaching English language at the Iran-America Society in Isfahan, Iran. He traveled in the Middle East from Turkey through Afghanistan, Pakistan and Northern India.

In 1977, Hinck moved to Seattle, Washington, where he worked in the local movie business, managing a landmark movie theater and buying and booking films. He subsequently became involved with the Greenpeace movement, co-founded the national organization known as Greenpeace USA, and served as National Campaign Director.

In 1990, Hinck earned a J.D. degree from the UC Berkeley School of Law. Hinck was associate editor of the California Law Review where he also published The Republic of Palau and the United States: Self-Determination Becomes the Price of Free Association.

In 1991, Hinck married Juliet Browne, whom he had met in law school. Browne is a partner at Verrill Dana law firm, where she is chair of the firm's Environmental Law Group. She is also a trustee of Unity College in Unity, Maine.

After law school, Hinck initially practiced law with Morrison & Foerster, then California's largest law firm. At MoFo, Hinck represented defendants in securities fraud class actions such as In re VeriFone Sec. Lit., Civ. No. C-90-2705-VRW (N.D. Cal.) He then practiced with Lieff Cabraser, a class-action law firm. Hinck worked on consumer and environmental class actions and served as plaintiffs' class counsel in the massive maritime environmental tort case In re Exxon Valdez Oil Spill.

In 1993, both Hinck and his wife Juliet Browne took positions as Assistant Attorneys General in Palau, a United Nations trusteeship in the Western Pacific. Hinck successfully litigated a series of cases that in 1994 enabled the Republic of Palau to become a sovereign nation. Hinck also successfully prosecuted criminal cases including one where he gained the conviction of legislators for trafficking in dangerous narcotics. In 1995 he was designated Acting Attorney General for the new nation.

In 1998, working with Lewis Saul & Associates, which has offices in Washington DC and Portland, Maine, Hinck filed the first statewide case in the country against oil companies over groundwater contamination in Maine caused by the gasoline additive MTBE. Subsequently, Hinck helped to organize cases nationwide for recovery from MTBE pollution.

== Environmental activism ==
=== Greenpeace USA ===
In November 1978, Hinck took a job in Seattle working for a monthly newspaper published by the environmental organization Greenpeace, then based in Vancouver, B.C. The next year, Hinck was hired as the Media and Campaign Director for Greenpeace Seattle. In late 1979, he represented that office at a meeting of the U.S.-based branches of Greenpeace and joined in the creation of the new national affiliate, Greenpeace USA.

In the years that followed, Hinck was instrumental in building Greenpeace USA into one of the nation's largest and most influential environmental groups. He led Greenpeace campaigns on a range of issues related to preserving clean air and water, protecting the marine environment, and encouraging development of clean energy.

From 1979 to 1981 Hinck played a leading role in efforts by Greenpeace Seattle and Greenpeace Vancouver to prevent oil pollution on the Northwest Coast. The Greenpeace campaign achieved a ban on oil supertankers in Puget Sound and an end to plans to construct the Northern Tier Pipeline.

Hinck led Greenpeace in some of its earliest work on controlling toxic pollution. In 1982, Hinck and Greenpeace exposed the dangerous practices of the Western Processing Company, a waste-handling firm. The company, located in Kent, Washington, had surreptitiously buried thousands of barrels of dangerous toxic compounds on company grounds. Greenpeace pressure eventually led to federal EPA enforcement proceedings. The site was placed on the federal Superfund list and was eventually completely cleaned up with money from WPC and its clients, including Boeing.

In 1983 Hinck assumed Greenpeace USA's key leadership position of Campaign Director. In that capacity, Hinck worked with Greenpeace Canada to confront a Russian whaling operation on the Siberian coast in the North Pacific. On July 18, 1983, Greenpeace's flagship Rainbow Warrior sailed into Soviet waters off Siberia just as the annual meeting of the International Whaling Commission was underway in Cambridge, England. The Greenpeace ship landed at a remote whaling station, where seven Greenpeace activists went ashore and were arrested. The Rainbow Warrior started out to sea in order to deliver to the outside world documentation of the whaling operation and the arrest of Greenpeace workers. Pursued by a warship, a merchant vessel and a helicopter, the Rainbow Warrior escaped across the Bering Strait to US waters near Nome, Alaska. The Greenpeace activists were held captive for five days while Hinck negotiated their release with Soviet authorities. The transfer was made at sea on the International Date Line from a Soviet warship to the Rainbow Warrior before a worldwide media audience.

Hinck collaborated on the worldwide effort to prevent dumping nuclear waste at sea. The work of Hinck's team at Greenpeace USA, along with that of collaborators, resulted in the U.S. government's dropping plans to recommence nuclear waste disposal at sea. Greenpeace subsequently achieved a total ban on nuclear dumping through the Convention on the Prevention of Marine Pollution by Dumping of Wastes and Other Matter, an international treaty now commonly referred to as the London Convention. Hinck also initiated efforts to curtail the incineration of highly toxic waste at sea. The efforts of Hinck and Greenpeace colleagues in North America and Europe resulted in a ban passed in the London Convention that effectively ended the practice. During this period, Hinck testified before Congressional committees and consulted on marine pollution issues with the Congressional Office of Technology Assessment and the National Committee on Oceans and Atmosphere.

In 1985, Hinck led Greenpeace campaigns for the control of pollution and protection of clean water throughout North America.

Hinck contributed to environmentalist successes against notorious toxic polluters, including the ASARCO Tacoma smelter in Washington state. For example, Chemical Waste Management (now WMX Technologies), later admitted that charges made against it for mishandling waste and other practices had "proved well-founded" and had resulted in important improvements.

Hinck initiated efforts related to toxic waste and toxic product exports from the Western industrialized countries to lesser developed countries. This campaign culminated in the adoption of a treaty known as the Basel Convention, which regulates transboundary shipping of hazardous waste; 160 nations are now signatories to this treaty.

In 1986 and 1987, Hinck and Greenpeace colleague Kelly Rigg initiated the first Greenpeace campaign to tackle environmental harm arising from the lending practices of the World Bank and other multilateral development banks.

In 1996, after attending law school and practicing law in California, Palau and Maine, Hinck returned to Greenpeace. He was hired by Greenpeace International Executive Director Thilo Bode to serve as International Campaign Director. In that capacity, working out of the Amsterdam headquarters, Hinck served as delegate to the 1997 convention in Kyoto, Japan, which generated the Kyoto Protocol.

=== Natural Resources Council of Maine ===
From 2003 to 2006, Hinck worked as Staff Attorney for the Natural Resources Council of Maine, Maine's leading environmental advocacy group. Hinck worked on developing clean renewable energy and alternatives to toxic pollution. In 2004, Hinck and NRCM achieved a substantial victory with the signing into law of Maine's landmark electronic waste law, which for the first time required manufacturers to take responsibility for environmentally sound recycling of computers and TVs.

While at NRCM, Hinck helped to make Maine a leader in reducing mercury pollution.

== Maine House of Representatives ==
=== Elections ===
Jon Hinck ran for the Maine House of Representatives in 2006 in Maine's 118th House District, based in the city of Portland. He defeated incumbent State Representative John Eder, a Green Independent, 52%-48%. In 2008, he won re-election to a second term against Joshua Miller, also a Green Independent, 74%-26%. In 2010, he won re-election to a second term against Green Independent Carney Brewer and Republican Mark Carpentier 72%-14%-14%. which covers part of Portland.

=== Tenure ===
In 2006 Hinck authored L.D. 837, An Act to Prevent Infant Exposure to Harmful Hormone-disrupting Substances, which would have set new guidelines for chemicals in children's products, including a ban on Bisphenol A, popularly known as BPA. The bill was defeated, but some of its provisions were subsequently adopted through rulemaking.

During Hinck's two sessions as co-chair of Maine Legislature's Committee on Energy, Utilities and Technology, the Committee worked on and unanimously passed out legislation on such subjects as: 1) rural broadband infrastructure, known in Maine as the "three ring binder"; 2) the smart grid; 3) ocean energy development; 4) energy corridors; and 5) Property Assessed Clean Energy ("PACE") legislation to provide innovative financing for efficiency, weatherization and residential use of renewable power. These bills were passed by the full legislature and signed into law by Governor Baldacci.

In 2010, Hinck successfully sponsored LD 1535, An Act To Create a Smart Grid Policy in the State, which was signed into law in 2010. The law promotes development of an electrical transmission system to manage and reduce energy use.

Hinck introduced a bill to encourage best practices and greater responsibility in the dispensing and prescribing of addictive painkillers like OxyContin; that bill has now been enacted as Resolve, To Reduce Opioid Overprescription, Overuse and Abuse.

=== Committee assignments ===
Hinck served as House Chair of the legislature's Committee on Energy, Utilities and Technology and was later ranking member. He served on the Joint Select Committee on Maine's Energy Future and the Commission to Study Maine's Energy Infrastructure. He served for several years as vice-chair of the Energy and Environment Committee of the Council of State Governments Eastern Regional Council, an organization of legislators from Eastern states and Canadian provinces. Hinck was also a member of the National Caucus of Environmental Legislators and the National Coalition of Legislators for Energy Action Now, pushing the United States Congress for progressive energy and climate policies.

=== Controversy ===
Hinck's wife, Juliet Browne, served on Governor John Baldacci's wind power task force and was a leading pro-wind power attorney in the state. Some anti-wind power activists alleged that Hinck, as co-chair of the Utilities and Energy Committee, had a conflict of interest regarding projects from which his wife's clients would benefit. He requested a ruling from the state Ethics Commission, which ruled that he would not violate the Legislature's ethics code.

== 2012 campaign for U.S. Senate ==
On November 12, 2011, Rep. Hinck announced his candidacy for the United States Senate seat then held by Olympia Snowe. Hinck collected over 2,000 signatures and appeared on the ballot for the Democratic Primary. Hinck lost the primary to State Senator Cynthia Dill, finishing in third place of the four contestants.

== Portland City Council ==
In November 2013, Hinck won a seat on the Portland, Maine City Council and was sworn in on December 2. Hinck defeated Portland attorney Wells Lyons, receiving 7,101 votes, 58 percent of those cast, while Lyons received 5,171 votes, or 42 percent.

For one year, Hinck chaired the Portland City Council's Energy & Sustainability Committee. Under his leadership in 2016, Portland: 1) committed to the construction of Maine's largest municipal solar power installation; 2) joined the fewer than two dozen municipalities in the United States that require energy building benchmarking of large commercial and residential buildings; and 3) committed to replace all of Portland's old street lights and changing them out for new energy-efficient LED units. In 2015, working with then Mayor Michael Brennan, Hinck was instrumental in assuring passage of a measure that for the first time set a minimum wage in the City of Portland higher than the statewide minimum. The new minimum wage of $10.10 an hour went into effect on January 1, 2016, and rose to $10.68 per hour on January 1, 2017, though the sub-minimum wage for service employees who receive tips was not increased, a carve-out that Hinck vocally supported. With the increase, Portland went from having the sixth lowest minimum wage in country as a function of the area cost of living to the nation's twelfth highest minimum wage. (In 2016, Maine voters passed a ballot initiative raising the minimum wage statewide to $12 by 2020; the statewide minimum wage became higher than Portland minimum wage as of January 1, 2019, making the city ordinance effectively moot.) In 2014, Hinck also played a lead role when Portland adopted an ordinance requiring a 5 cent fee on all disposable plastic and paper bags provided at supermarkets, grocery stores and other retail shops.

Hinck was defeated on re-election by Pious Ali. The two candidates agreed on many issues, but Ali advocated for a bond to renovate the city's four most run-down elementary schools while Hinck supported an alternative plan that entailed a request for partial state funding. Ali won with 63 percent of the vote, while Hinck received 20 percent and a third challenger, libertarian Matthew Coffey, received 17 percent.
