= Denise Harlow =

American politician (1970/1971–2026)

Member of the Maine House of Representatives from the 36th district
- In office December 3, 2014 – December 5, 2018
- Preceded by: Redistricted
- Succeeded by: Michael F. Brennan

Member of the Maine House of Representatives from the 116th district
- In office December 1, 2010 – December 3, 2014
- Preceded by: Charles Harlow
- Succeeded by: Redistricted

Personal details
- Born: 1970 or 1971
- Died: January 4, 2026 (aged 55) Oquossoc, Maine, U.S.
- Party: Democratic (before 2017); Independent (2017–2026)
- Relatives: Charles Harlow (father)
- Education: Brandeis University

Denise Patricia Harlow (1970 or 1971 – January 4, 2026) was an American politician from Maine. Harlow served in the Maine House of Representatives from December 2010 until December 2018 representing Portland, initially as a Democrat before leaving the party in 2017 and serving the remainder of her final term as an independent. She succeeded her father, Charles Harlow, for the District 116 seat in 2010.

In 2011, she introduced a bill to make Juneteenth a holiday in Maine. Elected four times as a Democrat, Harlow unenrolled from the Democratic Party, along with fellow representative Ralph Chapman, on May 26, 2017. She served the remainder of her final term as an independent. At the time, she said she still "aligned with the core Democratic values" but that "individual thinkers are often marginalized" within the party.

Harlow died on January 4, 2026, at the age of 55, after a battle with cancer. She had moved from Portland to Oquossoc in her final years.
