= Maine Green Independent Party =

Maine affiliate of the Green Party

- Co-chairs: Lyn Maravell & Kelly Merrill
- Senate leadership: None
- House leadership: None
- Headquarters: PO BOX 10345, Portland, Maine, 04104
- Membership (2026): ▼30,687
- Ideology: Green politics
- Political position: Left-wing
- National affiliation: Green Party of the United States
- Colors: Green
- Seats in the U.S. Senate: 0 / 2
- Seats in the U.S. House: 0 / 2
- Seats in the Maine Senate: 0 / 35
- Seats in the Maine House: 0 / 151
- Nonvoting seats in the Maine House: 0 / 3
- Local offices: 49 (August 2025)

Website
- mainegreens.org

The Maine Green Independent Party is a state-level political party affiliated with the Green Party of the United States. It is the oldest state green party in the United States. It was founded following an informal meeting of 17 environmental advocates, including Bowdoin College professor John Rensenbrink and others in Augusta, Maine in January 1984.

On September 21, 2017, state representative Ralph Chapman switched party affiliation from independent to the Green Independent Party. He did not stand for re-election in 2018 because he was term-limited. A month later, non voting member Henry John Bear also switched his party affiliation to the Green Independent Party from the Democratic Party.

== Party qualification ==
The party (in terms of registered votes) is currently in a period of continuous growth stretching back to 1998 according to state records. As of December 4, 2008 there were 31,676 Greens in the state comprising 3.19% of the electorate.

As of November 6, 2012, 37,764 Maine voters were registered in the Maine Green Independent Party, representing 3.83% of the statewide electorate.

As of August 31, 2017, enrollment in the MGIP had increased to 43,996 (4.23%) of Maine voters.

In August 2015, the party decided to open its 2016 primary to unenrolled voters.

== Portland Greens ==
The party realizes its greatest successes in the state's largest city, Portland. From 2002 to 2006, the highest-ranking elected Green in the United States was John Eder, who served in the Maine House of Representatives for Portland's West End neighborhood.

The School Committee was once the second "Greenest" governing body in the United States, and from 2004 to 2006, significant media attention was attributed to conflicts between the committee's Greens and Democrats. The Greens successfully passed precedent-setting policy limiting military recruiters' access to city high schools, and were recognized by the National School Board Association.

The Board of Trustees of the Portland Water District became the next governing body in Portland to have Green members, after Erek Gaines was elected in 2003 and David Margolis-Pineo in 2006.

In 2006, Portland elected two under-30 Green councilors (David A. Marshall and Kevin Donoghue) in the inner city West End and East End districts. In 2007, John Anton was elected at-large, which brought the number of Greens on the Portland City Council to three.

For the rewriting of the Portland charter, Greens Anna Trevorrow and Ben Chipman won seats on the Portland Charter Commission in June 2009. The two successfully pushed to include instant run-off voting in the new charter. They also supported extending voting rights in municipal elections to legal non-citizens.

In the 2011 mayoral election, two Greens, (Eder and Marshall) ran for the expanded mayoral position, using the newly established instant run-off voting methods established by the charter commission and approved by voters the year before. In the closing days of the campaign, Eder endorsed fellow candidate and former Democratic State Senator Ethan Strimling, not party member Marshall, causing significant controversy within the Greens. Marshall ended up finishing in 4th place of 15 candidates.

In March 2013, the Portland Green Independent Committee took out petitions to enact an ordinance which would make marijuana legal for adults 21 and older, though not in public spaces such as roads, schools and parks. Later, the Portland Greens were joined by the ACLU of Maine, the NAACP, the Libertarian Party of Maine, Fire Dog Lake, and the Marijuana Policy Project in endorsing the measure. The petition needed 1,500 valid signatures of Portland voters over 80 calendar days. The Portland Greens and their coalition partners turned in 2,508 valid signatures. On July 15, the City Council placed the ordinance on the November 5, 2013 ballot. On November 5, the Greens' legalization ordinance passed with 67% of the vote.

That same year, Anna Trevorrow was elected to an at-large seat on the School Board, joining Holly Seeliger. In 2014, John Eder was elected to the School Board, bringing the total number of Greens on the board to 3 for the first time since 2004. In 2015, six Greens sought office in Portland, including committee chair and economic justice activist Tom MacMillan, who ran for mayor and received over 10% in a three-way race with Michael Brennan and Ethan Strimling.

In 2017, School Board member and YouTube vlogger Holly Seeliger was criticized for giving credence to conspiracy theories including Pizzagate and the Murder of Seth Rich.

== 2010, 2014 and 2018 gubernatorial elections ==
Lynne Williams, a lawyer from Bar Harbor and former chair of the Party, announced that she intended to seek the Green Independent Party nomination for Governor of Maine in the June 2010 primary. Williams served on the planning board in Bar Harbor, Maine and was a 2004 candidate for the Maine House of Representatives. She dropped out of the race after failing to receive enough signatures to qualify for the Green Independent primary ballot for governor. Patrick Quinlan also filed the paperwork to run for the nomination.

In April 2014, former Maliseet tribal representative to the Maine House of Representatives and University of Maine graduate student David Slagger announced his intention to seek the Green nomination for Governor of Maine in 2014. Slagger addressed the 2013 Maine Green Independent Party Convention in Belfast on May 5.

Two candidates filed to run for the Green nomination for Governor in 2018: Bangor attorney Jay Parker Dresser, the 2016 Green candidate for Maine's 2nd congressional district, and activist Betsy Marsano of Waldo.

== 2020 elections ==
In 2020, Green Senate nominee Lisa Savage received 4.95 percent of the vote, marking the best percentage for a third party in the state's history of electing Senate candidates (beginning in 1914). Unable to gather the requisite signatures to make the Green Independent primary ballot, Savage instead opted to run with the Independent ballot label. Her record-breaking vote share was credited partly to the state's ranked-choice voting system for statewide elections, first implemented in 2018. That year, K. Frederick Horch, the Green nominee for the Maine State House's 49th district, also came close to winning his race, receiving 48.06 percent of the vote against a Democratic opponent, with no Republican on the ballot. This marked the first time a Green candidate had come to winning a seat in a contested state legislature election since 2010, when a Green legislative nominee in Massachusetts received 45 percent of the vote.
