= Peter Stuckey =

English cricketer (born 1940)

Peter Stuckey (born 18 March 1940) was an English cricketer. He was a right-handed batsman and a right-arm medium-fast bowler who played for Dorset. He was born in Bournemouth, Hampshire, which is now in Dorset.

Having made his Minor Counties Championship debut four years previously, Stuckey made a single List A appearance for the team, against Bedfordshire in the 1968 Gillette Cup. From the bottom of the order, Stuckey picked up six runs, and took figures of 0–11 with the ball.
