= Veterans for Bernie Sanders =

Political organization

- Formation: 2015
- Founder: Tyson Manker
- Type: Grassroots Association
- Purpose: Progressive US Politics
- Members: 50,000–100,000
- Website: http://vetsforbernie.org

Veterans for Bernie Sanders (also known as Vets for Bernie) was the national grassroots association of military veterans organized on behalf of Vermont Senator Bernie Sanders during his 2016 presidential campaign. Vets for Bernie was independent from the official campaign and largely organized via social media, with more than 50,000 military members and over 100,000 followers on Facebook, Twitter, and Instagram. Founded by veterans of the Iraq war and Afghanistan war, Vets for Bernie became a key organizing force for progressives and military voters for the Sanders campaign.

== Origins ==
Vets for Bernie was founded in June 2015 by former United States Marine Tyson Manker, a veteran of the 2003 Iraq invasion, at Sanders' first town hall event at Drake University in Des Moines, Iowa. After The Boston Globe indicated wider military support for the Senator, Manker and several other veterans began organizing themselves and working to identify other like-minded members of the United States Armed Forces. Air Force veteran Alexandra Ducatte joined VFB as National co-director, and membership eventually grew across all fifty states, Guam, and Puerto Rico.

== Activities ==
=== 2016 primary ===
Bernie Sanders served as chair of the Senate Veterans Affairs Committee, and was the first 2016 candidate for President to fully embrace the U.S. military with a robust veterans platform. He faced criticisms, however, for not preventing the Veterans Health Administration Scandal of 2014 that occurred during his tenure as committee chair. Through their website, Vets for Bernie highlighted the various awards and honors given to Sanders for his career of veterans advocacy and handling of the 2014 scandal. VFB was credited for developing innovative "social media content based around endorsements from individual veterans."

On July 30, 2015, Manker promoted Vets for Bernie and military support for Sanders in a live interview with John Seigenthaler on Al Jazeera America.

Vets for Bernie volunteers worked loosely with the Sanders campaign to organize veterans to attend local rallies. Early on, the Sanders campaign staged a military veterans press conference in Cedar Rapids, Iowa, with assistance from Vets for Bernie. VFB participated in Enough is Enough, Netroots Nation, and People's Summit. Along with the larger People for Bernie group, VFB was credited with using effective mobilization techniques.

On March 25, 2016, the Sanders campaign held a national conference call on Veterans' Issues with Congresswoman Tulsi Gabbard (D-HI), Manker and VFB Senior Advisor, Colonel Gordon Sumner, U.S. Army, ret. Later, Vets for Bernie organized veterans to take part in a New York City photo session in support of Sanders' candidacy.

=== Gettysburg rally ===
On April 22, the Sanders campaign held a military rally for veterans at Gettysburg College in Gettysburg, Pennsylvania, with help from Vets for Bernie.

=== VetsForBernie.org ===
Through a website (now restored), Vets for Bernie published over one hundred original news-style blog posts, which were shared more than one million times on social media. Most popular posts included:

- Who Are Bernie Sanders’ Top Contributors? Active Duty Army, Navy, & Air Force, That’s Who
- Bernie Sanders Remains Top Choice of U.S. Troops
- The Lack of Military and Veteran Support for Hillary Clinton Should Concern You

Individual outreach blogs, including:

- 95 Year-Old WWII Vet Voted for Bernie Sanders Today in Mississippi
- Meet Mark Maxey, the Bearded Man at Bernie’s OKC Rally
- Meet Leslie Lee III – Writer, Teacher, Bernie Sanders Supporter
- Police Chief: Bernie Is the First Candidate to Ever Offer and Pay Police Overtime

And at least one instance of serious journalism in a blog that analyzed video and photographic evidence to effectively debunk false accusations being leveled at the time that the Sanders campaign shared photographs from the Civil Rights Movement that were not of Sanders, when in fact they were.

=== Post-election and beyond ===
Along with other grassroots associations, Vets for Bernie continues to organize military veterans across America. Democratic candidate Tim Canova earned the first official endorsement from VFB in his first unsuccessful bid to unseat Debbie Wasserman Schultz. Vets for Bernie advises progressive candidates for Congress on military issues, most recently in drafting the veterans platform for Stephen Jaffe, candidate for California's 12th Congressional District.
