= Ethan Strimling =

American politician

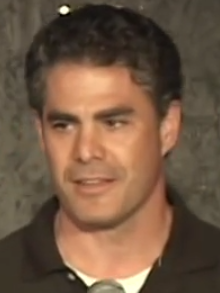

88th Mayor of Portland, Maine
- In office December 7, 2015 – December 2, 2019
- Preceded by: Michael F. Brennan
- Succeeded by: Kate Snyder

Member of the Maine Senate from the 8th district
- In office January 2003 – January 2009
- Preceded by: Anne Rand
- Succeeded by: Justin Alfond

Personal details
- Born: October 19, 1967 (age 58) New York City, New York, U.S.
- Party: Democratic
- Other political affiliations: Democratic Socialists of America
- Spouse: Mary Beeaker (former)
- Education: Juilliard School; University of Maine, Orono (BA); Harvard University (MEd)
- Website: Campaign website

Ethan King Strimling (born October 19, 1967) is an American non-profit executive, television personality, and politician from Maine. Strimling was elected to 3 terms in the Maine Senate (2003–2009), one term a Mayor of Portland, Maine (2015–2019), serving one term. Strimling previously served as a Democratic state senator from 2003 to 2009. He was the Executive Director of LearningWorks, a West End non-profit organization, and has served as a political columnist and commentator for the Portland Press Herald.

== Early life ==
Ethan Strimling was born and raised in New York City. His father, Arthur Strimling, was a Jewish theater director and midrashic story-maker based in Brooklyn. His mother was not Jewish but he was raised in Jewish culture. He attended the Juilliard School for Theater from 1985 to 1987. He earned a B.A. in History from the University of Maine. He also earned a master's degree in Education from Harvard University in 1994.

After school, he went to Washington, D.C. to work as a legislative aide for then-First District Congressman Tom Andrews. He then came back to Maine to serve as State Senator Dale McCormick's Campaign Manager for her 1996 Congressional race.

Strimling began serving as the Executive Director of Portland West, a non-profit social-service agency that works with at-risk kids and low-income families in Portland's West End, in 1997. Strimling has also served on the boards of several political and non-profit committees, including Maine Won't Discriminate, Casinos NO!, and the Maine NAACP.

== Political career ==
Strimling's first run for public office was for the Portland City Council in 1999. He was defeated by incumbent Jack Dawson by just 24 votes. During a recount, the City Council awarded 35 disputed ballots to Strimling after his campaign argued that voters who filled in a blank line below his name had intended to vote for him. After the Council decided to preliminarily award Stimling the election longtime city councilor and former Mayor Cheryl A. Leeman commented "This is the worst example of politics that I've seen in my years in this chamber." When Dawson appealed the decision to Maine Superior Court, Strimling announced that he would step aside and Dawson was awarded the council seat. During this race Strimling mistakenly took contributions in violation of Maine campaign finance law but commented "If I had known, I'd have complied"

In 2002, Strimling ran his first campaign for the Maine State Senate to succeed Anne M. Rand. He was elected in his first race with 74% of the vote and again in 2004 with 76%. He was elected for a third term in 2006. In the State Senate, Strimling was the Chair of the Labor Committee and also a member of the Taxation Committee. He has also served as Chair of the Criminal Justice and Public Safety Committee, and in 2006, was Co-Chair of Maine's Homeland Security Task Force.

In 2008, when Democratic Congressman Tom Allen announced that he would challenge U.S. Senator Susan Collins, Strimling declared that he would run for Maine's 1st congressional district. In the June 10 Democratic primary, Strimling finished fourth with 5,833 votes (out of 55,382 votes cast). He was succeeded in the Maine Senate by fellow Democrat Justin Alfond.

In February 2010, when Strimling was appointed to the New England board of the Anti-Defamation League, he became the first Maine resident to be appointed to the position.

On July 26, 2011, Strimling formally announced he was running for Mayor of Portland. Fellow former State Senator Michael F. Brennan won the election.

Strimling and former Republican State Senator Phil Harriman wrote the "Agree to Disagree" column on the Bangor Daily News website, which was named the "2013 Best State Political Blog" by The Washington Post. They are also political analysts for WCSH TV, working in tandem. On May 23, 2014, Strimling and Harriman wrote the last Daily News column and started writing their column for the Portland Press Herald on May 25. Strimling also is an analyst for WGAN radio.

On August 18, 2015, Strimling announced his intention to launch a second campaign for Mayor of Portland in the 2015 election on November 3, 2015. He won the race without needing an instant runoff, obtaining 51% of the vote. Incumbent Mayor Michael Brennan conceded the race at about 10 PM on election night.

Strimling announced his intention to seek a second term as Mayor in the 2019 Portland, Maine mayoral election on June 23, 2019. Strimling lost to Kate Snyder.

After his tenure in City Hall ended, Strimling became active in the Maine branch of the Democratic Socialists of America. In 2020, Strimling played a leading role in People First Portland, a campaign to pass five municipal ballot initiatives to raise the minimum wage to $15 an hour, enact rent control, ban facial recognition surveillance, limit short term rentals, and a Green New Deal. Four out of five initiatives passed (only the short-term rentals limit failed) despite being outspent by the Portland business community and the opposition of Mayor Kate Snyder.

In 2021 Strimling funded a push poll showing Maine Senate President Troy Jackson leading former governor Paul LePage in a hypothetical matchup in the 2022 Maine gubernatorial election with current Governor of Maine Janet Mills also polled against LePage.

== Personal life ==
Strimling and Mary Beeaker were married from 2004 to 2017. In February 2016, The Bollard acknowledged Strimling’s affair with his campaign manager, Stephanie Clifford, who was also married. The affair led to the end of both their marriages. He has no children and resides in Portland, Maine.

== Electoral results ==
2008 U.S. House Democratic primary, 1st district of Maine
Party	Candidate	Votes	%
Democratic	Chellie Pingree	24,324	43.9
Democratic	Adam Cote	15,706	28.3
Democratic	Michael Brennan	6,040	10.9
Democratic	Ethan Strimling	5,833	10.5
Democratic	Mark Lawrence	2,726	4.9
Democratic	Steve Meister	753	1.3
Total votes		55,382	100

Portland, Maine mayoral election, 2011
Party	Candidate	FPv%	Count														
Party	Candidate	FPv%	1	2	3	4	5	6	7	8	9	10	11	12	13	14	15
Nonpartisan	Michael Brennan	26.5	5,211	5,214	5,228	5,251	5,307	5,362	5,455	5,508	5,578	5,652	5,858	6,107	6,537	7,515	8,971
Nonpartisan	Ethan Strimling	22.3	4,392	4,399	4,406	4,435	4,452	4,505	4,554	4,601	4,674	4,754	4,859	5,072	5,472	5,934	7,138
Nonpartisan	Nicholas Mavodones	14.9	2,941	2,947	2,957	2,968	2,984	2,998	3,023	3,072	3,124	3,237	3,303	3,504	3,793	4,075	
Nonpartisan	David Marshall	7.6	1,506	1,507	1,526	1,542	1,548	1,616	1,636	1,653	1,677	1,717	1,894	2,002	2,306		
Nonpartisan	Jed Rathband	7.0	1,393	1,394	1,405	1,411	1,423	1,444	1,465	1,495	1,530	1,623	1,745	1,807			
Nonpartisan	Jill Duson	4.2	839	840	858	867	879	898	922	948	960	989	1,049				
Nonpartisan	Markos Miller	3.6	717	718	721	727	731	748	766	775	815	856					
Nonpartisan	Richard Dodge	3.3	662	666	667	667	675	680	691	740	789						
Nonpartisan	Christopher Vail	2.0	403	407	416	417	425	429	440	460							
Nonpartisan	Peter Bryant	1.8	366	367	371	373	385	392	403								
Nonpartisan	Ralph Carmona	1.6	316	317	320	324	339	344									
Nonpartisan	John Eder	1.3	274	275	278	291	298										
Nonpartisan	Charles Bragdon	1.1	218	220	223	226											
Nonpartisan	Hamza Haadoow	0.9	185	187	192												
Nonpartisan	Jodie Lapchick	0.6	130	130													
Nonpartisan	Write-in	0.4	81														
Valid: 19,634 Spoilt: 578 Turnout: 20,212

Candidate	Votes	Votes %
Ethan Strimling	9,162	51.1
Michael Brennan	6,882	38.4
Thomas MacMillan	1,880	10.5
Total Votes	17,924	100

Portland, Maine mayoral election, 2019
Party	Candidate	Round 1			Round 2			Round 3	
Party	Candidate	Votes	%	Transfer	Votes	%	Transfer	Votes	%
Non-partisan	Kate Snyder	7,119	39.33%	+ 458	7,577	42.08%	+ 2,883	10,460	61.89%
Non-partisan	Spencer Thibodeau	5,110	28.23%	+ 164	5,274	29.29%	+ 1,168	6,442	38.11%
Non-partisan	Ethan Strimling	4,575	25.28%	+ 580	5,155	28.63%	5,155	Eliminated	
Non-partisan	Travis Curran	1,296	7.16%	1,296	Eliminated				
Total votes								16,902	100.0%
