= Harlan Baker =

American politician

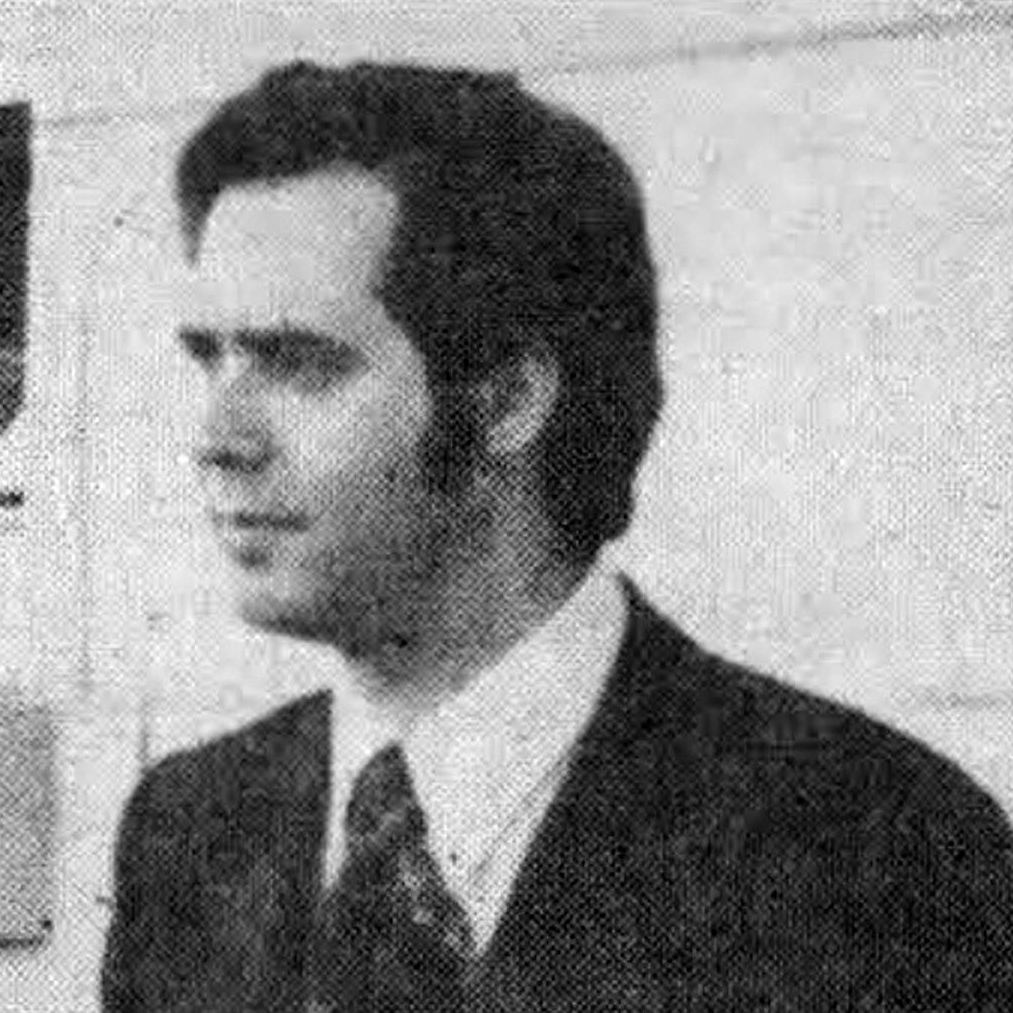
- Baker c. 1980

Member of the Maine House of Representatives
- In office 1979–1988

Personal details
- Born: November 16, 1947 (age 78) White Plains, New York, U.S.
- Party: Democratic
- Other political affiliations: Democratic Socialists of America
- Spouse: Kristen Carpenter
- Children: Kurt Baker
- Education: Emerson College, B.S; University of Maine M.A.

Harlan Baker is an American politician and playwright from Maine. Baker, a Democrat, served five terms in the Maine House of Representatives between 1979 and 1988. Baker is also an adjunct faculty member of the University of Southern Maine's theater department.

A labor advocate, Baker submitted a bill to create a state-owned bank during his time in the House of Representatives, saying that it would help the state's agricultural and fishing industries. He also sponsored a resolution urging the state retirement system reduce investments in South Africa, which at the time was ruled by the racist apartheid government.

Baker is a longtime member of the Democratic Socialists of America and was a delegate for Bernie Sanders at the 2016 Democratic National Convention.

== See also ==
- List of Democratic Socialists of America who have held office in the United States
