= Henry John Bear =

American politician from Maine (born 1956)

Member of the Maine House of Representatives for the Houlton Band of Maliseet Indians
- In office January 2013 – January 2019
- Preceded by: David Slagger
- Succeeded by: Brian Reynolds (Note: Appointed in 2025)

Personal details
- Born: 1956 (age 69–70) Lewiston, Maine
- Party: Green Independent (since 2017); Democratic (before 2017)
- Spouse: Violet
- Children: Four
- Education: University of Maine (L.L.M.); University of New Brunswick (J.D.); University of Maine (A.A.)
- Occupation: Treaty & Economic Rights Advocate

Henry John Bear is a Maliseet politician from Maine. In January 2013, he was sworn in as the first elected member of the Maine House of Representatives representing the Maliseet people. He replaced David Slagger, who was appointed to the Maine House.

Bear grew up in Lewiston, Maine living in poverty. At 17, he joined the United States Coast Guard, where he met his wife, Violet Dotson. The two have four grown children and eight grandchildren. He and his family live in Houlton, Maine, where they operate a Maliseet respite care facility.

== Career ==
=== Political ===
He was the Democratic candidate for the 144th district in the 2016 election. In November 2017, he became a member of the Maine Green Independent Party. Bear ran unsuccessfully for Maine's 2nd congressional district in 2018. The Maliseet people opted not to send a delegate to the Maine House of Representatives for the 2019-2020 session.

== Lawyer ==
He was admitted to the bar in Maine in late 2020, following completion of an L.L.M. degree at University of Maine School of Law in May. He has been engaged by a consortium of First Nations groups to sue the Catholic Church for conditions members experienced in residential schools in Canada.
