= Michael F. Brennan =

Maine politician

Michael Brennan
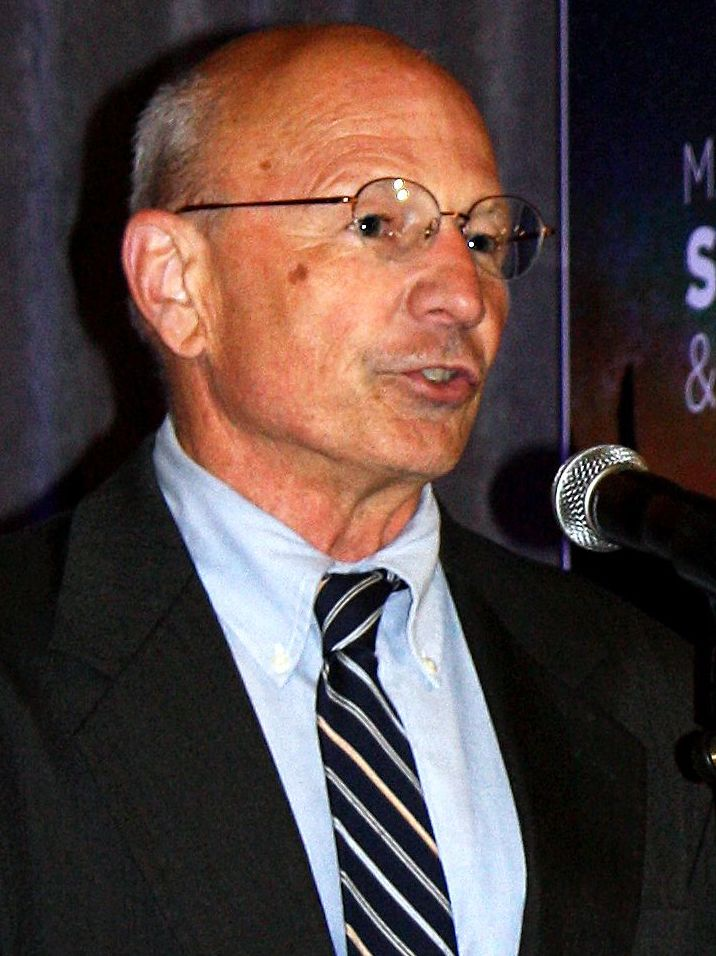
- Brennan in 2014

Member of the Maine House of Representatives
- Incumbent
- Assumed office December 7, 2022
- Preceded by: Josanne Dolloff
- Constituency: 115th district
- In office December 5, 2018 – December 7, 2022
- Preceded by: Denise Harlow
- Succeeded by: David Haggan
- Constituency: 36th district
- In office December 2, 1992 – December 6, 2000
- Succeeded by: Glenn Cummings
- Constituency: 37th district

87th Mayor of Portland, Maine
- In office December 5, 2011 – December 7, 2015
- Preceded by: Nicholas Mavodones Jr.
- Succeeded by: Ethan Strimling

Member of the Maine Senate
- In office December 1, 2004 – December 6, 2006
- Preceded by: Tom Sawyer
- Succeeded by: Joseph Brannigan
- Constituency: 9th district
- In office March 6, 2002 – December 1, 2004
- Preceded by: Joel Abromson
- Succeeded by: Paul T. Davis
- Constituency: 27th district

Personal details
- Born: 1953 (age 72–73) Portland, Maine, U.S.
- Party: Democratic
- Spouse: Joan Martay
- Children: 2
- Education: Florida State University (B.S.); University of Southern Maine (M.A.); University of New England (M.S.W.)
- Occupation: Politician
- Profession: Professor
- Website: Official website

Michael F. Brennan (born 1953) is an American politician who formerly served as the 87th Mayor of Portland, Maine. Brennan, a Democrat, served as State Senator from 2002 to 2006 and Senate Majority Leader and a 2008 Democratic candidate for Maine's 1st congressional district. On May 15, 2011 Brennan announced his candidacy in the Portland, Maine mayoral election. On November 9, Brennan won the 15-candidate contest and became the first directly-elected mayor of Portland since 1923.

== Early life and education ==
Brennan earned his BS in Education from Florida State University, his MA in Public Policy from the Muskie School of Public Service at the University of Southern Maine, his MSW from the University of New England and has completed the Senior Executive Program in State and Local Government at Harvard Kennedy School at Harvard University.

Brennan is a licensed clinical social worker and worked as a policy associate at the Muskie School of Public Service at the University of Southern Maine, where he directed projects related to child welfare, substance abuse, mental health, and public policy. He has served as an adjunct faculty member at the University of New England and served as Co-Chair on the National Board of Advisors of Casey Family Services. Brennan has also worked as an affordable housing developer and, in the 1970s was an anti-nuclear activist with the Clamshell Alliance.

== Maine legislature ==
=== Elections ===
Brennan represented part of Portland in the Maine House of Representatives from 1992 to 2000 and in the Maine Senate from 2002 to 2006.

In 1992, he was elected to Maine's 37th House District. In 1994, he won re-election to a second term with 70%. In 1996, he won re-election to a third term with 75%. In 1998, he won re-election to a fourth term unopposed.

In January 2002, incumbent State Senator Joel Abromson died. A special election was held in March 2002, and he ran in the vacant 27th District and won with a plurality of 41%, defeating Republican Sally Vamvakias by just 10 votes. In the November 2002 election, he defeated her in a rematch 53%-40%. After redistricting, he decided to run in the newly redrawn Maine's 9th Senate District and won unopposed.

In 2018, Brennan returned to the Maine House of Representatives after easily defeating the Republican in District 36.

=== Committee assignments ===
He served as chair of the Education Committee, the Health and Human Services Committee and the Joint Select Committee on Health Care Reform. He served as Senate Majority Leader.

== Mayor of Portland ==
On December 8, 2011, Brennan led his first city council meeting as mayor. The meeting featured a 4+ hour discussion on whether to allow OccupyMaine, which was part of the Occupy movement, to obtain a 6 month permit to use two-thirds of nearby Lincoln Park. Brennan and 7 other councilors voted against the permit, while West End City Councilor David Marshall was the lone supporter of the permit.

Upon the passage of Maine's same-sex marriage law, Mayor Brennan stated that he would look into the possibility of opening Portland City Hall at 12:01 AM on December 29, 2012, the day the law takes effect, to issue marriage licenses in order to have the first legal same-sex wedding in Maine occur in Portland. He also stated that he wanted to attend the first same-sex wedding in the City, whenever that might be.

In 2013, Brennan was a vocal supporter of a plan to sell two-thirds of Congress Square Park to Rockbridge Capital. The plan was subsequently defeated via a citizens' initiative in June 2014 by a vote of 51.5% to 48.5%.

In his 2014 State of the City address, Brennan proposed a municipal minimum wage increase. In 2015, the City Council voted in favor of a plan to increase the minimum wage to $10.68 per hour. Brennan opposed a citizens initiative to increase the minimum wage to $15 per hour by 2019.

Mayor Brennan announced on June 3, 2015 that he would seek reelection but was defeated by old rival Ethan Strimling.

== Personal life ==
Brennan lives in Portland with his wife, Joan Martay. They have two grown children, Travis and Ryan.

== Electoral history ==
- 2008 Democratic Primary for Congress - 1st District
  - Chellie Pingree 44%
  - Adam Cote 28%
  - Michael Brennan 11%
  - Ethan Strimling 11%
  - Mark Lawrence 5%
  - Stephen Meister 1%
- 2011 Mayoral
  - Michael Brennan 26.76%
  - Ethan Strimling 22.42%
  - Nicholas Mavodones 15.00%
  - David A. Marshall 7.74%
  - Jed Rathband 7.12%
  - Jill Duson 4.26%
  - Markos Miller 3.67%
  - Richard Dodge 3.42%
  - Christopher Vail 2.06%
  - Peter Bryant 1.87%
  - John Eder 1.38%
  - Charles Bragdon 1.09%
  - Hamza Haadoow 0.94%
  - Jodie Lapchick 0.65%
  - Note: Through 14 rounds of instant runoffs, Brennan extended the lead he built on Election Day. During the retabulation process, second choice votes for lower ranked candidates were systematically reallocated to higher ranked candidates until an individual claimed more than 50 percent of the total.
