= Portland City Council (Maine) =

Governing body of Portland, Maine

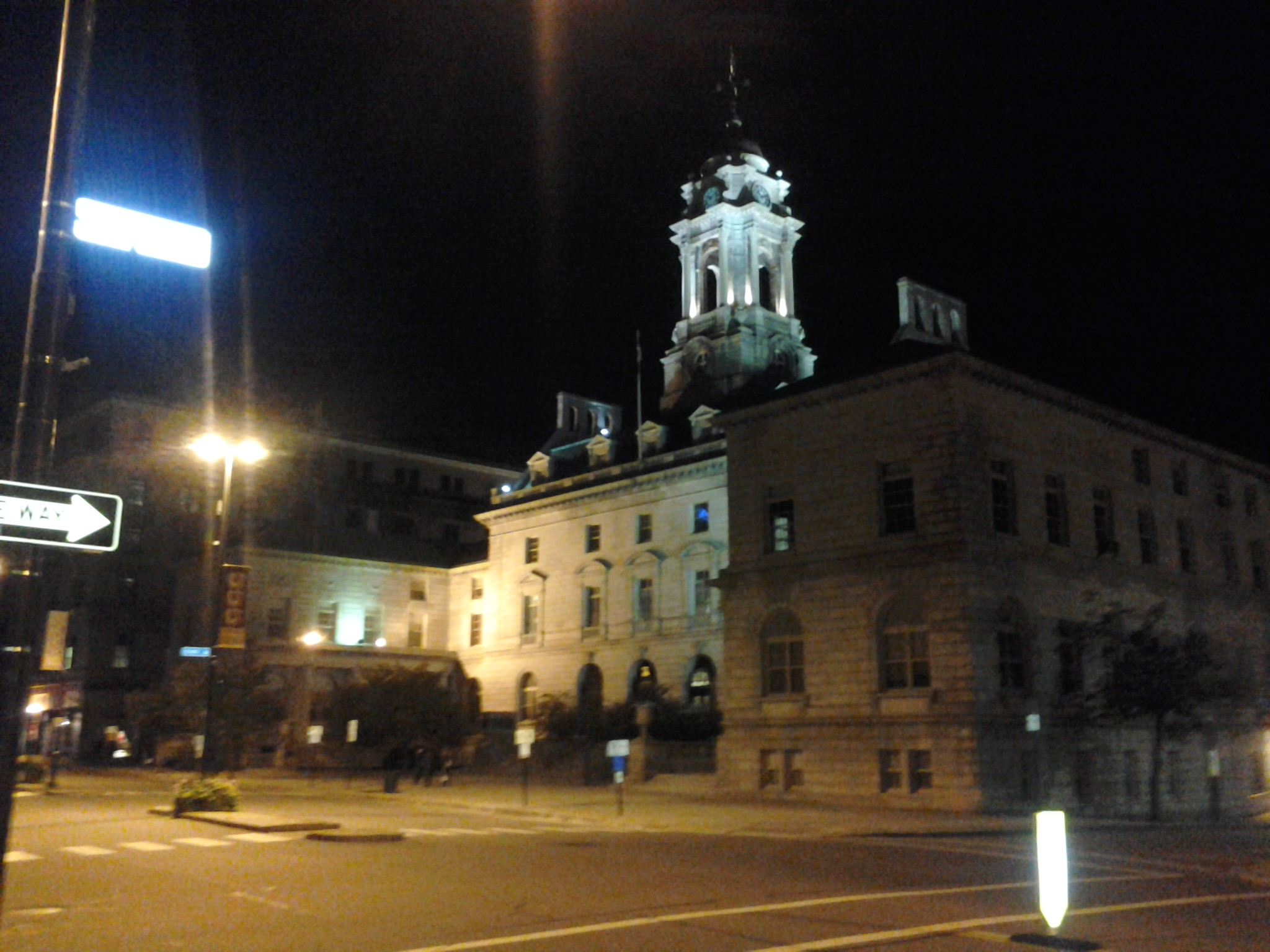
City Hall in September 2011

The legislative branch of Portland, Maine, is a city council. It is a nine seat council, composed of representatives from the city's five districts, three councilors elected citywide and the full-time elected Mayor of Portland. The eight councilors are elected for three-year terms, while the Mayor is elected for a four-year term.

The council is officially non-partisan, though councilors are often known for their political party affiliation.

In 1923, the city transitioned from a Mayor–council government to a Council–manager government. This change was in large part motivated by the efforts of the Ku Klux Klan, which saw growing influence in the state during the 1920s, and resented what they perceived as the growing power of ethnic and religious minorities. In 2011 the city charter was changed to allow an election for mayor again in 2011. Subsequent elections were held in 2015, 2019 and 2023.

In 2020, voters approved a proposal to switch elections for City Council and school board to ranked-choice elections.

In 2022, voters approved a proposal to switch elections for City Council to Proportional Ranked Choice Voting. However the practical effect of this vote is to use instant-runoff voting, due to all members being elected in single-winner contests. Five council members are elected in single seat districts, and the three at-large members are elected in staggered elections.

The Portland City Council meets at Portland City Hall, an historic 1909 building on Congress Street.

== Current Councilors ==
=== Current Council ===
1. Mayor: Mark Dion elected in the 2023 election (since 2023)
2. District 1: Sarah Michniewicz (since 2025)
3. District 2: Wesley Pelletier (since 2025)
4. District 3: Regina Phillips (since 2022)
5. District 4: Anna Bullett (since 2023)
6. District 5: Kate Sykes (since 2023)
7. At-Large: Pious Ali, (since 2016)
8. At-Large: April Fournier (since 2020)
9. At-Large: Benjamin Grant (since 2025)

==== Mayor: Mark Dion ====
Mark Dion is an American politician, law enforcement officer, and lawyer. A former detective in the Portland Police Department, he was the elected sheriff of Cumberland County and served from 1998–2010. He served in the Maine House of Representatives from 2010–2016. While in the legislature, Dion advocated for marijuana legalization. Dion ran for Governor of Maine in 2018, placing fifth in the Democratic Party primary. In 2020, he was elected to the Portland City Council from the fifth district with 39% of the vote in a four-way race. In 2023, he announced that he would run for mayor later that year, and was elected over District 4 councilor Andrew Zarro, at-large councilor Pious Ali, and three other candidates.

==== District 1: Sarah Michniewicz ====
Sarah Michniewicz is a small business owner and community activist. She was first elected in 2024.

==== District 2: Wesley Pelletier ====
Wesley Pelletier is a native of Topsham, and a community organizer. He is a member of the Maine branch of the Democratic Socialists of America. He was elected to his first term in 2024.

==== District 3: Regina Phillips ====
Regina Phillips is an adjunct professor of social work at the University of Southern Maine. She is the daughter of Gerald Talbot, who was the first African American elected to the Maine House of Representatives. Her sister, Rachel Talbot Ross, is a member of the Maine Senate and is a former Speaker of the State House. Phillips was elected to her first term in 2022.

==== District 4: Anna Bullett ====
Anna Bullett is the director of health and nutrition programs at The Opportunity Alliance, which works with low-income people in Cumberland County. A native of Auburn, she was elected to her first term in 2023.

==== District 5: Kate Sykes ====
Kathryn "Kate" Sykes is the former co-chair of the Maine branch of the Democratic Socialists of America, and remains a member of the organization. She was a candidate for this seat in 2020, finishing as runner up to future Mayor Mark Dion. She was elected to the council in 2023 by a 57–43 margin. She is a writer by profession.

==== At-Large: Pious Ali ====
Elected to the council in 2016 after serving one term (three years) on Portland's Board of Public Education 2013–2016, Pious Ali is currently the longest-tenured member of the city council. He won his first term by 62% in a three-way race to replace the incumbent Jon Hinck. He was re-elected in 2019 and 2022. He finished third in Portland's 2023 Mayoral election. In 2025, Ali was re-elected to a fourth three-year term with 60.58% of the vote in a two-person race. Ali worked at the University of Southern Maine’s Muskie School of Public Service. He is the founder and former Executive Director of http://portlandempowered.org. He is an alumnus of the Institute for Civic Leadership (now known as Lift360), and in 2015, was named Lift360’s Most Distinguished Alumnus. A native of Ghana — the first Ghanaian to be elected into any public office in the United States — Ali immigrated to the United States in 2000, and has lived in Portland since 2002.

==== At-Large: April Fournier ====
Elected to the council in 2020, April Fournier is Diné and a native of New Mexico who previously worked for Unum. She is the National Program Director of Advance Native Political Leadership, and is the first Indigenous person elected to the Portland City Council. First elected in 2020, she was re-elected in 2023.

==== At-Large: Benjamin Grant ====
Benjamin Grant is a former chairman of the Maine Democratic Party and was previously a member of the Portland School Board. He was elected to his first term in 2024.

== See also ==
- List of mayors of Portland, Maine
