= Mark Dion (politician) =

American politician, law enforcement officer and lawyer

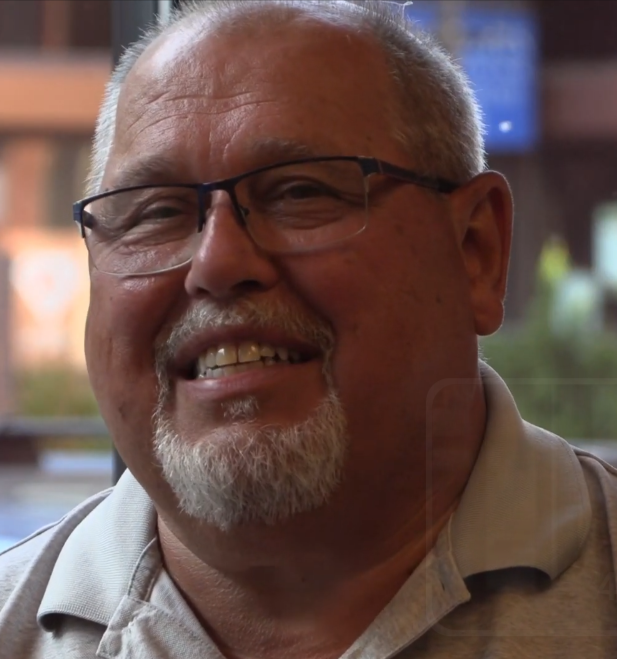

90th Mayor of Portland
- Incumbent
- Assumed office December 4, 2023
- Preceded by: Kate Snyder

Member of the Maine Senate from the 28th district
- In office December 2016 – December 2018
- Preceded by: Anne Haskell
- Succeeded by: Heather Sanborn

Member of the Maine House of Representatives from the 113th district
- In office December 2010 – December 2016
- Preceded by: Joan Cohen
- Succeeded by: Heather Sanborn

Personal details
- Born: 1955 (age 70–71) Lewiston, Maine, U.S.
- Party: Democratic
- Education: University of Southern Maine (BA); Antioch University, New England (MA); University of Maine, Portland (JD)
- Website: Mayor of Portland website

Mark N. Dion (born 1955) is an American politician, law enforcement officer and lawyer from Maine, who has served as Mayor of Portland since December 4, 2023.

== Education and early life ==
Dion grew up in Lewiston, Maine and graduated from Lewiston High School in 1972. He later earned a B.A. in criminal justice at the University of Southern Maine, a M.A. in human services administration from Antioch University New England and a J.D. from the University of Maine School of Law.

== Political career ==
=== Sheriff ===
Dion, a Democrat, was elected Sheriff of Cumberland County, Maine, in 1998. Dion was criticized during his 2002 campaign for using a county credit card and attending law school. After being re-elected in 2002 and 2006, Dion chose not to seek re-election as Sheriff in 2010.

=== Legislature ===
Rather than seek re-election as sheriff, he successfully sought a seat in the Maine House of Representatives. In 2013, Dion was named Chair of the Criminal Justice and Public Safety Committee. In March 2015, while a member of the House, Dion announced that he would sponsor legislation to make marijuana legal. In 2016, he was elected to the Maine Senate, where he served one term.

=== 2018 gubernatorial election ===
Dion ran for Governor of Maine in 2018, placing fifth in the Democratic Party primary.

=== Portland City Council and Mayor of Portland ===
In 2020, he won a seat on the Portland City Council after a four-way race where he won 39% of the vote. In June 2023, Dion announced his intention to run for mayor of Portland. During his campaign, he promised to continue supporting a policy of forcibly removing homeless people from public spaces, stating “The sweeps will continue.” Incumbent mayor Kate Snyder, herself the former executive director of the Maine Department of Corrections, endorsed Dion. He won the election on November 7, 2023, earning 39.6% in the first round and earning 51.5% in the ranked-choice runoff. The Maine Morning Star described Dion as "Portland's version of a law-and-order candidate." He was sworn in on December 4.

Political offices
Preceded by Kate Snyder	Mayor of Portland; 2023–present	Incumbent
