= John Eder =

American politician

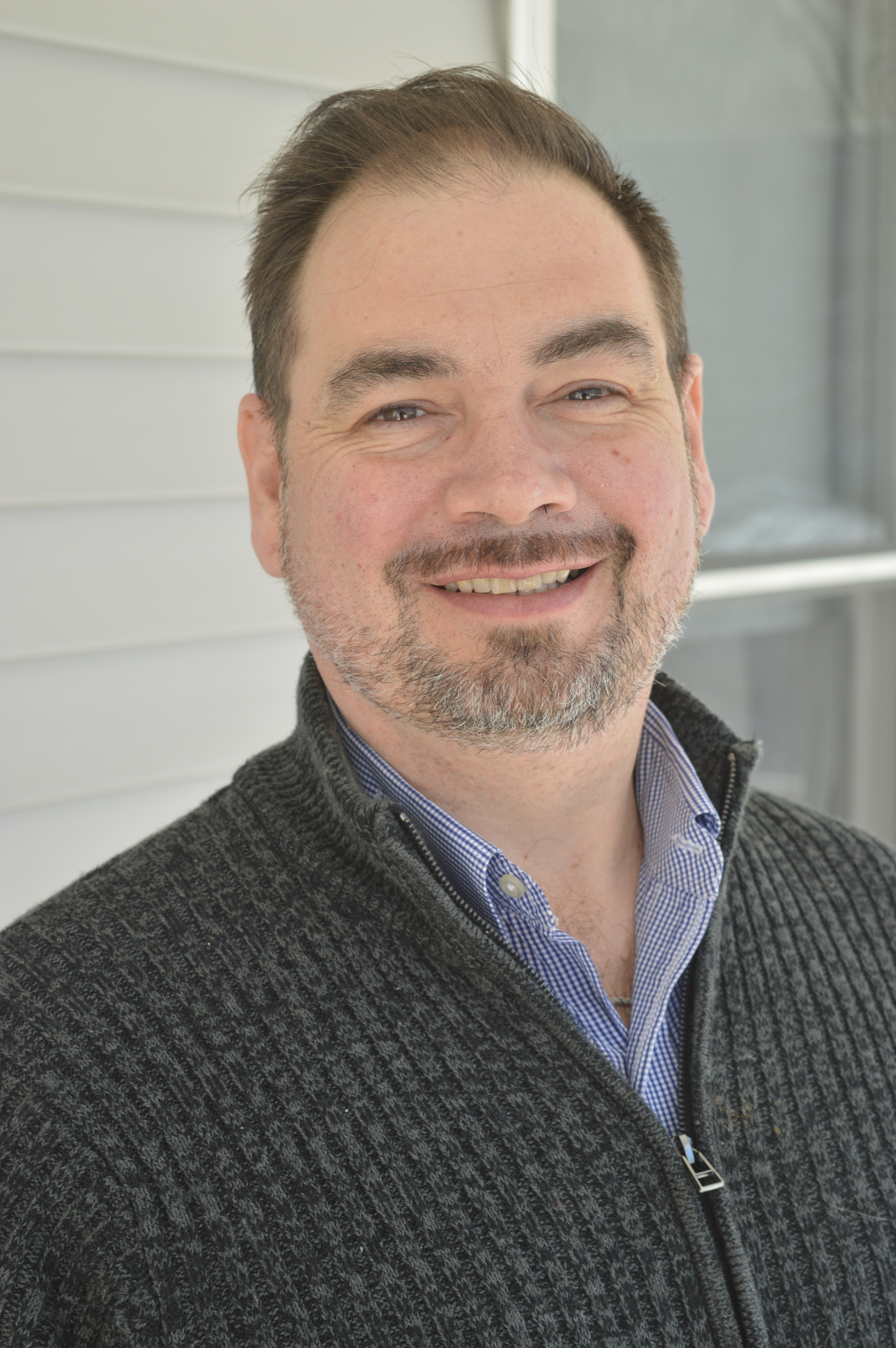
- Eder in 2018

Member of the Maine House of Representatives
- Incumbent
- Assumed office December 3, 2024
- Preceded by: Heidi H. Sampson
- Constituency: 136th district
- In office January 2003 – January 2007
- Preceded by: Mike Saxl
- Succeeded by: Jon Hinck
- Constituency: 118th district

Personal details
- Born: January 18, 1969 (age 57) Brooklyn, New York, U.S.
- Party: Republican (since 2024); Democratic (2018–2024); Green (formerly)
- Spouse: Lauren Besanko
- Children: 1
- Education: University of Southern Maine
- Occupation: Outreach Coordinator at Health Choice Maine
- Profession: Political Consultant
- Website: www.john4me.com

John Eder (born January 18, 1969) is an American activist and politician from Maine. Eder lives in Waterboro. A member of the Maine Republican Party, Eder is a former member of the Maine Green Independent Party and the Maine Democratic Party. He served in the Maine House of Representatives as the legislature's first member of the Green Party for two terms and was elected in 2002 and re-elected in 2004. Until his defeat in 2006 Eder was one of only a handful of independent or third party state legislators in the country and was the highest-ranking elected Green official in the United States. Eder ran for Mayor of Portland, Maine in 2011. In 2014, Eder won a race for an at-large seat on the Portland Board of Education.

In 2018, Eder unsuccessfully sought the Democratic nomination for a seat in the Maine House of Representatives in Biddeford. He claimed that "Democratic values" moved him to join the party. Eder had previously supported Democrats while maintaining his Green voter registration, including future Portland Mayor Ethan Strimling. Eder became a Republican in 2024, and again sought a seat in the State House of Representatives. He was elected that year.

== 2002 election to Maine House of Representatives ==
Eder, then a Green Independent, won election with 65% of the vote, stepping into the seat vacated by Democrat and former House Speaker Michael V. Saxl who had to step down due to term limits.

Since legislators not enrolled with a political party typically caucus with one of the two major parties, it was assumed by Maine political observers that Eder would be forced to do the same. However, he was able to secure recognition of himself as a one-member Green Party caucus in the House. He negotiated to have a dedicated staff person assigned to him, something individual legislators in the Maine House, who serve on a part-time basis, do not have. With this Eder established the first ever Green Party Minority legislative office in any state.

In his first session Eder introduced legislation to give tax incentives for the purchase of alternative fuel vehicles, a bill to create a single-payer health care system in Maine and another to limit corporate power. He passed legislation protecting schoolchildren from cancer-causing chemicals. This was the first legislation sponsored by a Green to be passed through a state legislature and signed into law in the United States.

== Redistricting and service in the House ==
Following redistricting passed in 2003, Eder won re-election in 2004.

In September 2005 during the break between legislative sessions Hurricane Katrina struck New Orleans. Two weeks later Eder deployed with the Red Cross to drive a food canteen truck and provide case management to victims of the storm.

== 2006 elections ==
Eder lost the 2006 election to the Maine House by about 60 votes to Democrat Jon Hinck. Eder entered the campaign as a favorite, and many environmental, gay-rights, labor, and progressive organizations lined up behind him. A controversy erupted when Eder paid for an automated phone call to voters with a recorded message from the head of the local chapter of the National Organization for Women (NOW) endorsing Eder and questioning Hinck's position on women's rights based on Hinck's answers to NOW's candidate questionnaire. Hinck declared himself pro-choice, but he did not commit to supporting a woman's right to an abortion in every circumstance. The phone calls didn't mention that they were paid for by Eder's campaign. Hinck claimed that the call violated state elections law by failing to disclose who paid for them. A new law passed earlier that year required that an automated robocall include a "tag" identifying who paid for them. The commission fined Eder $100. Hinck won the election with 51.5% of the vote to Eder's 48.5%

== Contributions ==
Eder is considered a founding father of the Green Party in Portland.

Eder is further credited with changing Portland's political landscape by bringing young voters in Portland into the political process and paving the way for the Greens to assume their present role as the second party of contention in Portland, Maine's largest city. Several young activists who Eder mentored have since won political office in Portland. Former Eder campaign volunteers David A. Marshall and Kevin Donoghue took seats on the Portland City Council, becoming the first registered Greens to serve on that body. In 2010, his former Legislative Aide, Ben Chipman, won a seat in the Maine Legislature.

Eder was the first member of a third-party to serve in the Maine Legislature since 1915 when representatives of Theodore Roosevelt's Progressive Party held legislative offices there. Eder remains the only state legislator in the country to serve a full term as a Green and to be re-elected as a Green.

== Post Legislature ==
In November 2008 Eder was elected to the Cumberland County Charter Commission. Eder finished second out of five declared candidates running a write-in election for two seats. Eder travels the country speaking to regular citizens about to run and win local office as a way to demystify politics and feel empowered by taking personal responsibility for their own governance.

Eder is a recipient of the George Mitchell Peace Scholarship. He studied at Southern Maine Community College.

== 2011 Portland mayoral election ==
Eder was a candidate for mayor in the 2011 Portland mayoral election. In the race Eder focused on providing living wages, affordable housing and health care for the city's working class residents. He was endorsed among the top three candidates for mayor by the League of Young Voters. Eder was also endorsed as the best choice for mayor by the Portland Phoenix on the issue of "social services." The Phoenix said of Eder, "as a campaigner who has championed the city's working poor — by advocating for living wage, affordable healthcare, and better housing options — Eder has shown that he is passionate about helping the city's neediest citizens".

Upon making its endorsements in the mayor's race, the Portland Daily Sun said, "John Eder’s ideas surrounding affordable housing and public transportation (especially when it comes to replacing school buses with METRO passes) were apparently good enough to be incorporated by several opponents."

Eder cross-endorsed fellow candidate, former legislative colleague and Democrat Ethan Strimling, a first such cross-endorsement in the Portland mayoral race, which used instant-runoff voting for the first time in Maine. This led the Maine Green Independent Party, which had donated to Eder's campaign, to endorse the other Green in the race, City Councilor David Marshall.

== Portland Board of Education 2014–2017 ==
Eder served a term on the Portland Board of Education during which time he chaired the committee to oversee the transition plan to have Greater Portland METRO buses transport Portland Public Schools’ high school students to and from school. In addition, Eder advocated for the renovation of the districts elementary schools. Eder did not seek re-election.

== Failed bid for Democratic nomination and switch to Republican Party ==
In January 2018, Eder announced his bid for the Democratic nomination for District 12 of the Maine House of Representatives. He was subsequently defeated in the June primary by Victoria Foley. In February 2020, the Bangor Daily News published a letter to the editor by Eder in which he advocated the repeal of a law which eliminated most exemptions from state child vaccination requirements, including religious exemptions.

In 2024, Eder filed to run as a Republican for an open Maine House of Representatives seat in Waterboro, district 136. On his campaign website, Eder states "I’m running for State House so I can tell my kids I defended our God given constitutional rights and freedoms – freedom of speech, the right to self defense, property, and privacy." Eder was elected.
