= Charles Bailey Clarke =

American politician (1875–1944)

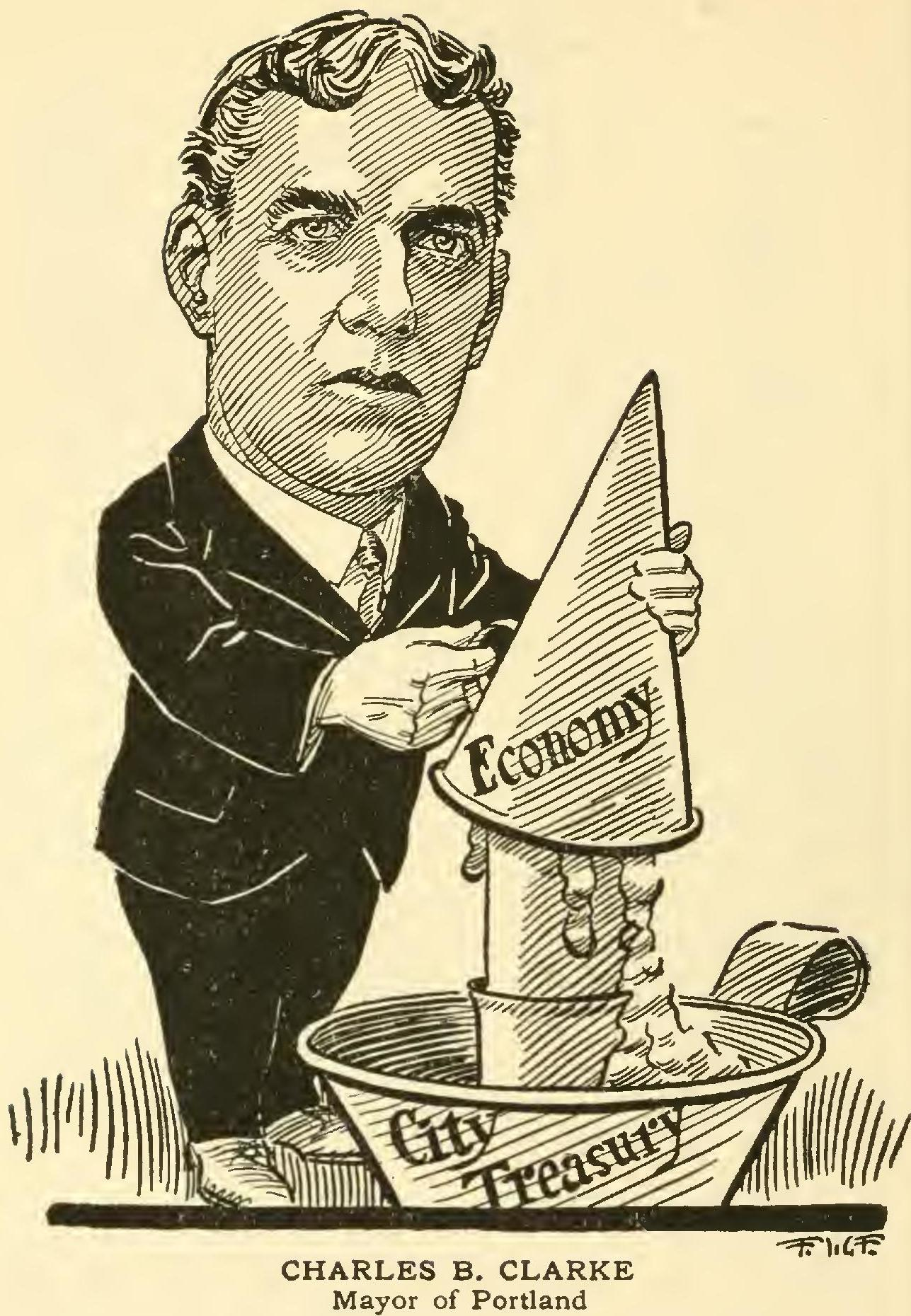
Charles B. Clarke Mayor of Portland art from the 1918 book, Mother Goose Comes to Portland

Charles Bailey Clarke (October 3, 1875 – January 27, 1944) was an American politician and banker from Portland, Maine. Clarke was elected four terms as mayor of Portland between December 1917 and December 1920). In 1921, he was replaced by fellow Republican Carroll Chaplin.

== Early life ==
Clarke was born in Bangor, Maine on October 3, 1875. His parents were Charles Davis and Catherine Dillingham Clarke. He and his family moved to Portland two years later. At the age of 15, Clarke was forced to drop out of high school, finding work with the Burnham & Morrill Company. He eventually rose to the position of company treasurer. In 1901, Clarke married Ellen A. Cate. Clarke was an active member of the Episcopal Diocese of Maine; he held lay many positions within the Diocese, including a 28 year stint as treasurer prior to his 1938 retirement.

== Politics ==
Clarke was elected to Common Council twice before being elected to the Board of Alderman in 1915. The United States entered World War I in April 1917 and Clarke served as Mayor of Portland throughout the war and its aftermath. In November 1917, Clarke was one three candidates for the Republican nomination for mayor, including the incumbent mayor Wilford G. Chapman and Representative Edgar E. Rounds. During the campaign, the Evening Express newspaper described Clarke as a financier and Clarke's campaign promised "a real business administration" if elected. At the Republican caucus, Clarke received 1,194 votes, a plurality of the 2,702 total votes, and his delegates for the mayoral nominating convention were chosen in five of the city's nine wards. The Evening Express predicted that he would be a "fine, dignified, business-like Mayor of Portland." On December 4, he defeated Democrat Edward Hannaford. Clarke was subsequently re-elected in 1918, 1919, and 1920. In June 1920, while incumbent mayor, Clarke sought the Republican nomination for Maine's 1st congressional district but lost in the primary to Carroll L. Beedy by just 19 votes. He was re-elected as mayor once more in December 1920 but did not seek re-election in 1921. In 1932, Clarke was appointed to an opening on the Board of Cumberland County Commissioners. In 1938, he was appointed chair. He was re-elected to that position until his death.

== Death ==
He died on January 27, 1944 following surgery at the Maine General Hospital, aged 68. His funeral services were held at the Cathedral Church of St. Luke. His former home at 223 Western Promenade, built in 1907, is now part of the Western Promenade Historic District. After years of being left derelict, the building was redeveloped and awarded a 2014 Honor Awards for Rehabilitation by the non-profit Maine Preservation.
