= Gerard Conley =

Gerard Conley may refer to:

- Gerard Conley Sr. (1930–2018), American politician from Maine
- Gerard Conley Jr. (born c. 1954), his son, American lawyer and politician

== See also ==
- Garrard Conley (born 1984 or 1985), American author and LGBTQ activist
