= Senator Conley =

Senator Conley may refer to:

- Benjamin F. Conley (1815–1886), Georgia State Senate
- Cole Conley (born 1950), North Dakota State Senate
- Gerard Conley Jr. (born c. 1954), Maine State Senate
- Gerard Conley Sr. (1930–2018), Maine State Senate
- William Conley Jr. (born 1953), Rhode Island State Senate

== See also ==
- Senator Connelly (disambiguation)
