= South Street Historic District (Gorham, Maine) =

Historic district in Maine, United States

- U.S. National Register of Historic Places
- U.S. Historic district
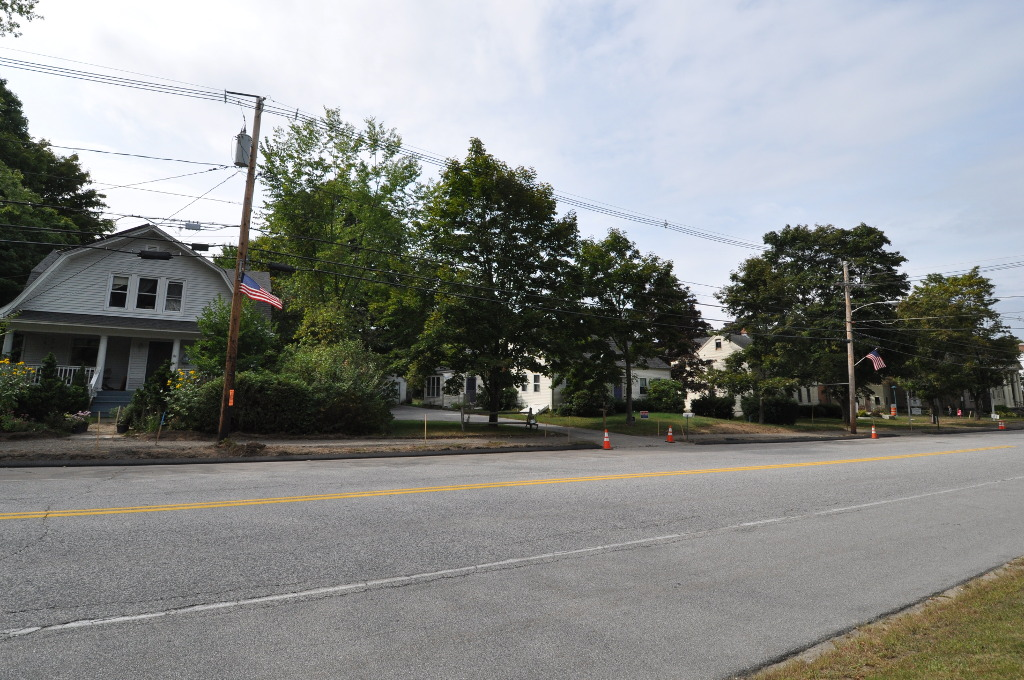
- View of South Street

- Location within Maine Location within the United States
- Location: South St. between Green and Morrill, Gorham, Maine
- Coordinates: 43°40′37″N 70°26′29″W
- Area: 9 acres (3.6 ha)
- Architect: Gilkey, Isaac; Moulton, Otis E.
- Architectural style: Greek Revival, Gothic Revival, Federal
- NRHP reference No.: 88000398
- Added to NRHP: April 20, 1988

The South Street Historic District encompasses an early residential area of Gorham, Maine. Located just south of Gorham's small commercial center, South Street is lined with an architecturally cohesive collection of about 20 late-18th and early-19th century houses, primarily interrupted only by the presence of the modest Colonial Revival Baxter Memorial Library. The district was listed on the National Register of Historic Places in 1988.

== Description and history ==
The town of Gorham was first settled by white settlers in 1736, but it was not until after the French and Indian Wars ended in the 1760s that significant growth took place, resulting in its incorporation in 1764. The town center was laid out at the junction of Main and South Streets (Maine State Routes 25 and 114) in the 1750s, with a small cemetery and schoolhouse just to its south. The area south of the cemetery, along South Street, was originally farmland, but gradually developed as a residential area in the early 19th century.

The district lines both sides of South Street, roughly between Preble Street and Morrill Avenue. The oldest surviving house, that of Reuben Nason at 65 South Street, was built about 1794, and is one of the town's least-altered examples of 18th-century architecture. Nason, who purchased the house in 1810, was the first headmaster at Gorham Academy. Also prominent in the district is the Baxter House, now a museum, which is notable as the home of two of Maine's governors, James Phinney Baxter and Percival Baxter. It stands next to the 1907-08 Colonial Revival Baxter Memorial Library, the only non-residential building in the district, which was a gift to the town of James Phinney Baxter.

== See also ==
- National Register of Historic Places listings in Cumberland County, Maine
