= William Moulton Ingraham =

American politician

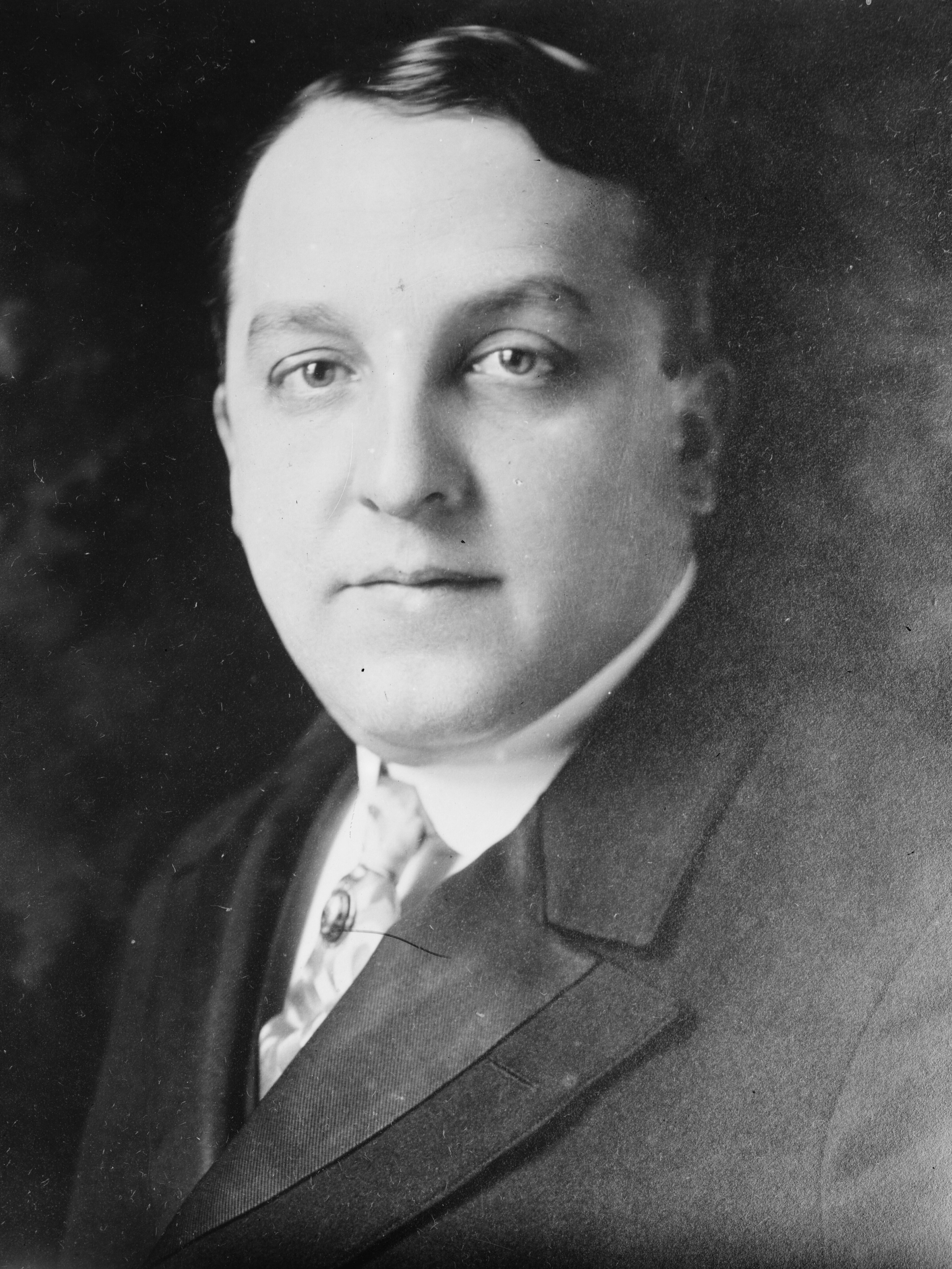
- William Moulton Ingraham

47th Mayor of Portland
- In office 1915–11915
- Preceded by: Oakley C. Curtis
- Succeeded by: Wilford G. Chapman

Personal details
- Born: November 21, 1870 Portland, Maine, US
- Died: October 13, 1951 (aged 80) Portland, Maine
- Party: Democrat
- Education: Bowdoin College, Harvard Law School

William Moulton Ingraham (November 21, 1870 – October 13, 1951) was an American lawyer and politician from Portland, Maine. Elected once as mayor of Portland, he served as Assistant Secretary of War for one year from 1916 to 1917 in the Woodrow Wilson administration.

== Biography ==
Ingraham was born in 1870 to Ella Moulton and Darius H. Ingraham. His father served as mayor of Portland from 1892 to 1893 and was twice appointed consul-general. Ingraham was a graduate of Bowdoin College in the class of 1895 as well as Harvard Law School. He studied law under Augustus H. Moulton and was admitted to the Maine bar in 1897. In 1901, he married Jessamine P. Damsel of Evanston, Illinois.

In 1907 he was appointed Judge of Probate, a position he held for two terms.

A Democrat, Ingraham was elected Mayor of Portland in December 1915. He served one term in that position and was replaced the following year by Republican Wilford G. Chapman. He was then appointed United States Assistant Secretary of War from 1916 to 1917 in the Wilson administration. His federal service coincided with that of Franklin D. Roosevelt while the latter was Assistant Secretary of the Navy.

He was appointed Collector of Port of Portland by Wilson in 1917, lasting until 1922. He then returned to practicing law. His final campaign for public office occurred in 1924, when he unsuccessfully challenged Rep. Carroll L. Beedy for Maine's 1st congressional district as a "wet" or anti-Prohibition Democrat. In 1928, he was a delegate to the Democratic National Convention.

He died unexpectedly on October 13, 1951 at his family home located at 79 High Street. Funeral services were held at the nearby Cathedral Church of St. Luke. He is buried at Portland's Evergreen Cemetery.
