= Portland Armory =

Portland Armory may refer to:

- Portland Regency Hotel & Spa, Portland, Maine
- The Armory (Portland, Oregon)
