= List of mayors of Portland =

List of mayors of Portland may refer to:

- List of mayors of Portland, Maine
- List of mayors of Portland, Oregon
