= Darius H. Ingraham =

American politician and businessman

Darius Holbrook Ingraham

37th Mayor of Portland
- In office 1893–1893
- Preceded by: George W. True
- Succeeded by: James Phinney Baxter

Personal details
- Born: October 14, 1837 Portland, Maine, US
- Died: July 11, 1923 (aged 85) New York City, US
- Party: Democrat

Darius Holbrook Ingraham (October 14, 1837-July 11, 1923) was an American lawyer, diplomat, and politician from Maine. He was twice appointed U.S. consul abroad by president Grover Cleveland and served one term as mayor of Portland, Maine.

A lifelong member of the Democratic Party, Ingraham was appointed U.S. consul in Cádiz, Spain by President Grover Cleveland in July 1885. He was confirmed by Senate the following May. After being defeated for re-election by Republican James Phinney Baxter, he was appointed by Cleveland to the position of U.S. consul in Halifax, Nova Scotia. During his time in Halifax, he dealt with a high-profile nautical murder case. Following the completion of his appointment, Ingraham returned to Portland and re-entered politics. He was the unsuccessful Democratic nominee for mayor in 1898, 1902, and 1903.

== Mayoral campaigns ==
Ingraham was a frequent candidate for mayor of Portland as the Democratic nominee during the 1890s and 1900s. Ingraham served in office during a time of intense nativism and anti-Catholic sentiment among Portland's Protestant majority. Known as a progressive, Ingraham was elected mayor of Portland in 1892. In September of that year, Ingraham was the Democratic nominee for Maine's 1st congressional district, a seat held by powerful incumbent Thomas Brackett Reed since 1876. Though he received a greater share of the vote than any other Democratic nominee for House in Maine that year, he lost to the incumbent Reed 51% to 46%. In 1893, Ingraham ran for re-election and was well-respected by the city's Catholic population. He was endorsed by The Pilot, the newspaper of the Archdiocese of Boston. It described him as "a thorough Jacksonian Democrat, devoid of all narrowness, recognizing that the naturalized citizen has equal rights with others, and equally loyal to the maintenance of American institutions." His opponent, businessman James Phinney Baxter, was well-known for his opposition to the city's Irish residents. Ultimately, Baxter defeated Ingraham and became mayor for the first time in 1893.

In 1898, Ingraham was again the Democratic nominee for mayor, but was defeated by incumbent Republican Charles H. Randall. In 1902, he was defeated by Republican Frederic E. Boothby. A year later, Ingraham again unsuccessfully sought another term as mayor, losing to Boothby.

== Personal life ==
The Ingraham family home at 79 High Street was built in 1800 and has been recognized as an historic building by Greater Portland Landmarks. Ingraham was born on October 14, 1837 in Camden, Maine. The Ingraham family was well-established during the nineteenth and early twentieth centuries. His grandfather, Joseph Holt Ingraham was a silversmith. His cousin, Joseph was a writer. Darius' son, William, served as mayor of Portland in 1915 before being appointed United States Assistant Secretary of War from 1916-17.

In July 1923, Ingraham died in New York City. His body was returned to Portland and funeral services, led by Edmund R. Laine, Jr., dean of the nearby Cathedral Church of St. Luke, were held. He is interred at Evergreen Cemetery.
