= Baxter House (Gorham, Maine) =

Historic house in Maine, United States

- U.S. National Register of Historic Places
- U.S. Historic district – Contributing property
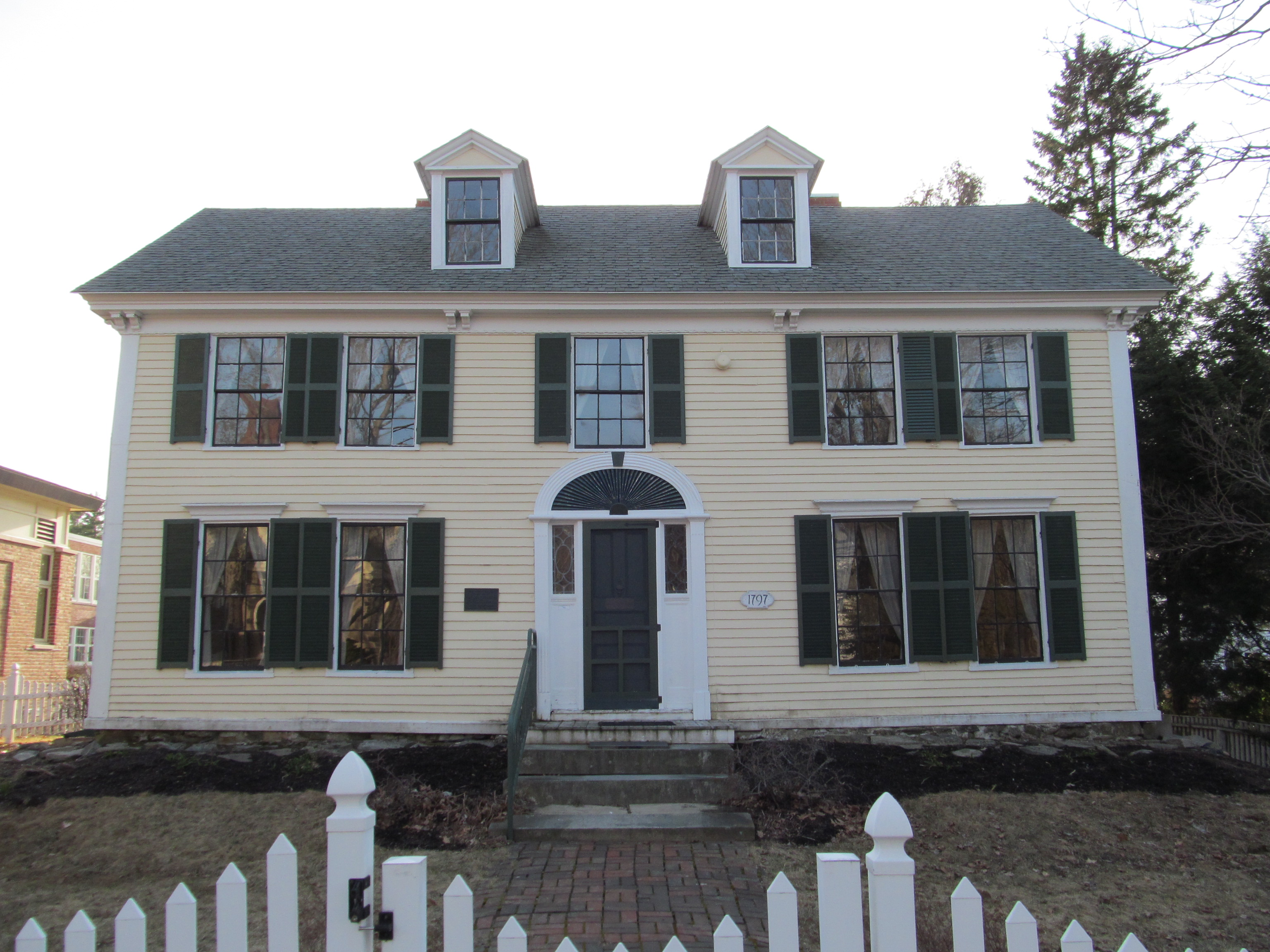
- Baxter House

- Location within Maine Location within the United States
- Location: 67 South Street, Gorham, Maine
- Coordinates: 43°40′37″N 70°26′34″W
- Built: 1797
- Architectural style: Federal
- Part of: South Street Historic District (ID88000398)
- NRHP reference No.: 79000135

Significant dates
- Added to NRHP: June 27, 1979
- Designated CP: April 20, 1988

The Baxter House is an historic house museum at 67 South Street in Gorham, Maine, United States. Built in 1797, it was the birthplace of James Phinney Baxter, mayor of Portland . He was the father of two-term Governor of Maine Percival Baxter. The house was donated to the town by James Phinney Baxter in 1907, and opened as a museum in 1908. It is open on Tuesdays and Thursdays from June to August. It was listed on the National Register of Historic Places in 1979.

== Description and history ==
The Baxter House stands on the west side of South Street, a short way south of the town center, and immediately north of the Baxter Memorial Library. It is a 2 1/2-story wood-frame structure, five bays wide, with a side-gable roof, a single off-center interior chimney, and clapboard siding. The (east-facing) front is symmetrical, with a central entrance flanked by short sidelight windows and pilasters, and topped by a Federal style semi-oval fan. A pair of small gabled dormers project from the roof, whose cornice has widely spaced pairs of brackets. A two-story ell extends to the rear.

The house was built in 1797 by Isaac Gilkey, a local carpenter who is credited with other buildings in the South Street area. It was acquired by Doctor Elihu Baxter in 1812, and is where is youngest son, James Phinney Baxter, was born in 1831. Later 19th-century residents of the house included Dr. N. H. Cary and his daughter, the famous opera singer Annie Louise Cary. James Phinney Baxter repurchased his birthplace in 1907, and donated it to the town, with the stipulation that a library be built on its site, and that the home be preserved as a museum in honor of his father. The house was moved to its present location, just north of its original site, and the library was built in its place.

James Phinney Baxter served six terms as Mayor of Portland, Maine (1893-1896 and 1904–1905) and was a leading local businessman and philanthropist. Percival Baxter served two terms as Governor of Maine, and is best known for donating most of the land for Baxter State Park. Annie Louise Cary became America's favorite singer in the third quarter of the 19th century.

== See also ==
- National Register of Historic Places listings in Cumberland County, Maine
