= Mayor of Portland =

Mayor of Portland may refer to:

- Mayor of Portland, Oregon
- Mayor of Portland, Maine
