= Frank W. Robinson =

American politician and lawyer

The Honorable Frank W. Robinson

40th Mayor of Portland
- In office 1899–1900
- Preceded by: Charles Randall
- Succeeded by: Frederic E. Boothby

Personal details
- Born: Frank Woodbury Robinson; November 27, 1853; Deering, Maine, U.S.
- Died: February 16, 1922 (aged 68); Portland, Maine, U.S.
- Political party: Republican
- Spouse: Frances Wheeler (died 1913)
- Education: Harvard University (LLB)
- Occupation: Lawyer; politician

Frank Woodbury Robinson (November 27, 1853 – February 16, 1922) was an American politician and lawyer from Maine. Robinson served as Mayor of Portland, Maine from 1899 to 1900.

Robinson graduated from Portland High School in 1873 and Harvard Law School in 1875. He was admitted to the bar in Cumberland County, Maine in October 1875 and became a member of the law firm Libby, Robinson & Turner. Two years later, in 1877, Robinson was appointed assistant attorney for Cumberland County. He replaced Moses M. Butler, who had been elected mayor of Portland. In 1888, he was elected Cumberland County District Attorney. Re-elected twice as District Attorney, he was then appoint judge of the Portland Municipal Court in 1893. He held that position until March 1899, when he was elected mayor.

Robinson married Ida Frances Wheeler (1855–1913) and died in Portland at the age of 68.
