= John Deering =

John Deering may refer to:

- John Deering (baseball) (1879–1943), professional baseball player
- John Deering (murderer) (1898–1938), murderer executed by State of Utah
- John Deering (politician) (1833–1904), mayor of Portland, Maine
