= Senator Allen =

Senator Allen may refer to:

== Members of the United States Senate ==
- George Allen (American politician) (born 1952), U.S. Senator from Virginia from 2001 to 2007
- Henry Justin Allen (1868–1950), U.S. Senator from Kansas from 1929 to 1930
- James Allen (Alabama politician) (1912–1978), U.S. senator from Alabama from 1969 to 1978
- John B. Allen (1845–1903), U.S. Senator from Washington from 1889 to 1893
- Maryon Pittman Allen (1925–2018), U.S. Senator from Alabama in 1978
- Philip Allen (Rhode Island politician) (1785–1865), U.S. Senator from Rhode Island from 1853 to 1859
- William V. Allen (1847–1924), U.S. Senator from Nebraska from 1899 to 1901
- William Allen (governor) (1803–1879), U.S. Senator from Ohio from 1837 to 1849

== United States state senate members ==
- Aris T. Allen (1910–1991), Maryland State Senate
- Ben Allen (California politician) (born 1978), California State Senate
- Benjamin Allen (Wisconsin politician) (1807–1873), Wisconsin State Senate
- Carolyn Allen (1937–2016), Arizona State Senate
- Charles Herbert Allen (1848–1934), Massachusetts State Senate
- Charles Allen (Massachusetts politician) (1797–1869), Massachusetts State Senate
- Chaz Allen (born 1970), Iowa State Senate
- Clifford Allen (1912–1978), Tennessee State Senate
- Diane Allen (born 1948), New Jersey State Senate
- Dorathy M. Allen (1910–1990), Arkansas State Senate
- Ethan B. Allen (1781–1835), New York State Senate
- Frank G. Allen (1874–1950), Massachusetts State Senate
- Fred J. Allen (1865–1918), Maine State Senate
- Frederick Allen (Maine politician) (1914–2001), Maine State Senate
- Gerald Allen (politician) (born 1950), Alabama State Senate
- Gordon P. Allen (1929–2010), North Carolina State Senate
- Jason Allen (politician), Michigan State Senate
- John J. Allen (judge) (1797–1871), Virginia State Senate
- John W. Allen (1802–1887), Ohio State Senate
- John Allen (soldier) (1771–1813), Kentucky State Senate
- Joseph Allen (Maine politician) (fl. 1900s–1910s), Maine State Senate
- Karl B. Allen (born 1960), South Carolina State Senate
- Mark Allen (politician), Oklahoma State Senate
- Martin F. Allen (1842–1927), Vermont State Senate
- Nelson Allen (1933–2005), Kentucky State Senate
- Norman M. Allen (1828–1909), New York State Senate
- Philip K. Allen (1910–1996), Massachusetts State Senate
- Richard J. Allen (politician) (born 1933), Michigan State Senate
- Robert E. Allen (politician) (1924–2014), Colorado State Senate
- Robert Allen (Virginia politician) (1794–1859), Virginia State Senate
- Samuel Clesson Allen (1772–1842), Massachusetts State Senate
- Stephen Allen (American politician) (1767–1852), New York State Senate
- Sylvia Allen (born 1947), Arizona State Senate
- Thomas Allen (representative) (1813–1882), Missouri State Senate
- Victor M. Allen (1870–1916), New York State Senate
- William J. Allen (1829–1901), Illinois State Senate
- William S. Allen (1857–1926), Iowa State Senate
- Willis Allen (1806–1859), Illinois State Senate

== See also ==
- Edgar Allan (1842–1904), Virginia State Senate
