= Boothby Square =

Square in Portland, Maine

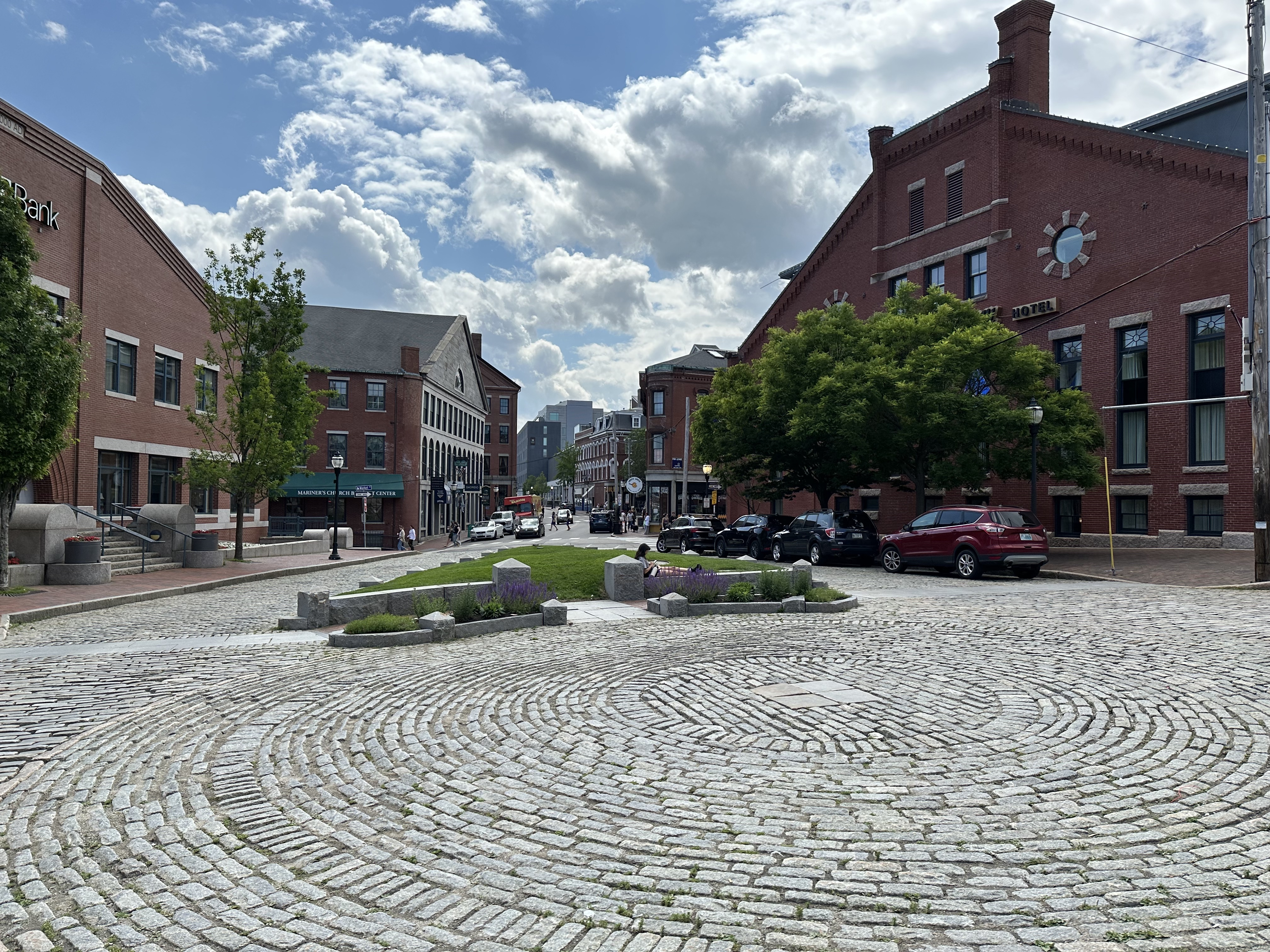
- The square in 2023, looking southwest from the Silver Street intersection
- Maintained by: City of Portland
- Location: Portland, Maine, U.S.
- Coordinates: 43.65701°N 70.251887°W

Boothby Square is a public square in Portland, Maine, United States. Located on the last remaining cobblestoned section of Fore Street, it is named for Frederic E. Boothby, a former mayor of Portland. A water trough in the square is dedicated to Boothby's philanthropic wife, Adelaide.

Now open, but surrounded by sections of granite blocks, the square was formerly enclosed by iron railings. The street is bisected by Silver Street.

== Boothby Square Watering Trough ==
The Boothby Square Watering Trough was installed in 1902 to supply water for horses and dogs and a peaceful respite for people. Its installation was part of the City Beautiful movement. In 1946 it was struck by a car and knocked off its base. The crash broke the ornate top section. Shortly afterward, the trough was removed and put in storage. It was purchased by an antiques dealer in 1983. Donors raised $50,000 to buy back the trough and reinstall it.

== "Tracing the Fore" ==
In 2006, the City of Portland installed a piece of public art, titled "Tracing the Fore", in the square, created by landscape artist Shauna Gillies-Smith. It cost around $135,000. The piece received a large amount of criticism, and was removed in 2011. It was sold for $100 at a local auction, with the successful bidder also paying $9,000 for its removal. Gillies-Smith, based in Cambridge, Massachusetts, claimed the City did not want to put the funds towards making the sculpture look acceptable, while Alex Jaegerman, Portland's planning-division director, refuted the claim that money was the issue. He had received a petition without around 150 signatures, asking for the sculpture to be removed.

== See also ==
- Samuel Butts House, 334 Fore Street
- The Hollow Reed, 334 Fore Street
- Portland Regency Hotel & Spa, rear of building abuts Boothby Square, entrance at 20 Milk Street
