= Edwin Berry =

Edwin Berry may refer to:

- Edwin C. Berry (1854–1931), American hotelier
- Edwin S. Berry (1845–1934), Australian surveyor and explorer
