= Charles Randall (Maine politician) =

American politician and businessman

Charles H. Randall

39th Mayor of Portland
- In office 1897–1898
- Preceded by: James Phinney Baxter
- Succeeded by: Frank W. Robinson

Personal details
- Born: February 27, 1846 Deering, Maine, US
- Died: May 18, 1924 (aged 78) Portland, Maine, US
- Party: Republican

Charles H. Randall (February 27, 1846 - 18 May 1924) was an American businessman and politician from Maine. Randall, a Republican, served as Mayor of Portland, Maine from 1897 to 1898. He also served in the Maine Legislature from 1901 to 1906. He was a partner in Simonton & Randall, which sold groceries and flour.

Randall was born in the town of Deering, Maine in 1846. Deering was annexed to the city of Portland in 1899. He attended Portland Public Schools, including Portland High School. Among his instructors was future Speaker of the U.S. House of Representatives Thomas Brackett Reed.

In 1897, Randall won the Republican nomination for Mayor by defeating incumbent James Phinney Baxter. He defeated Democrat Edward B. Winslow in the general election.

In 1898, Randall defeated former mayor Darius H. Ingraham, the Democratic nominee, and Daniel P. Parker, the Prohibition Party nominee.

He died at his home at 112 State Street in Portland, Maine, on May 18, 1924. He is buried at Evergreen Cemetery.
