= The Hollow Reed =

Defunct vegetarian restaurant in Portland, Maine, U.S.

Coordinates: 43.6568°N 70.2518°W

- Industry: Restaurant
- Founded: February 7, 1974
- Founders: Victoria Jahn; Bobbi Goodman; Frank LaTorre
- Defunct: 1981
- Headquarters: Portland, Maine, United States

The Hollow Reed was a vegetarian restaurant in the Old Port district of Portland, Maine. It opened on February 7, 1974, and closed in 1981, and is cited for its influence on the city's notable restaurant culture.

== History ==
The Hollow Reed was opened on 334 Fore Street, in the Old Port's Boothby Square, on February 7, 1974, by vegetarians and volunteers at the Good Day Market cooperative grocery store Victoria Jahn, Bobbi Goodman and Frank LaTorre. It was the first vegetarian restaurant in Portland. After a restoration, the original brick walls and dark beams were left intact.

The Hollow Reed was an all-vegetarian restaurant during 1974 but in 1975 seafood was added to the menu. Later the restaurant added chicken and meat to the menu. The restaurant's change of the menu was controversial with shoppers at the all-vegetarian Good Day Market and this caused the market to make and sell vegetarian sandwiches. The Hollow Reed closed in 1981.

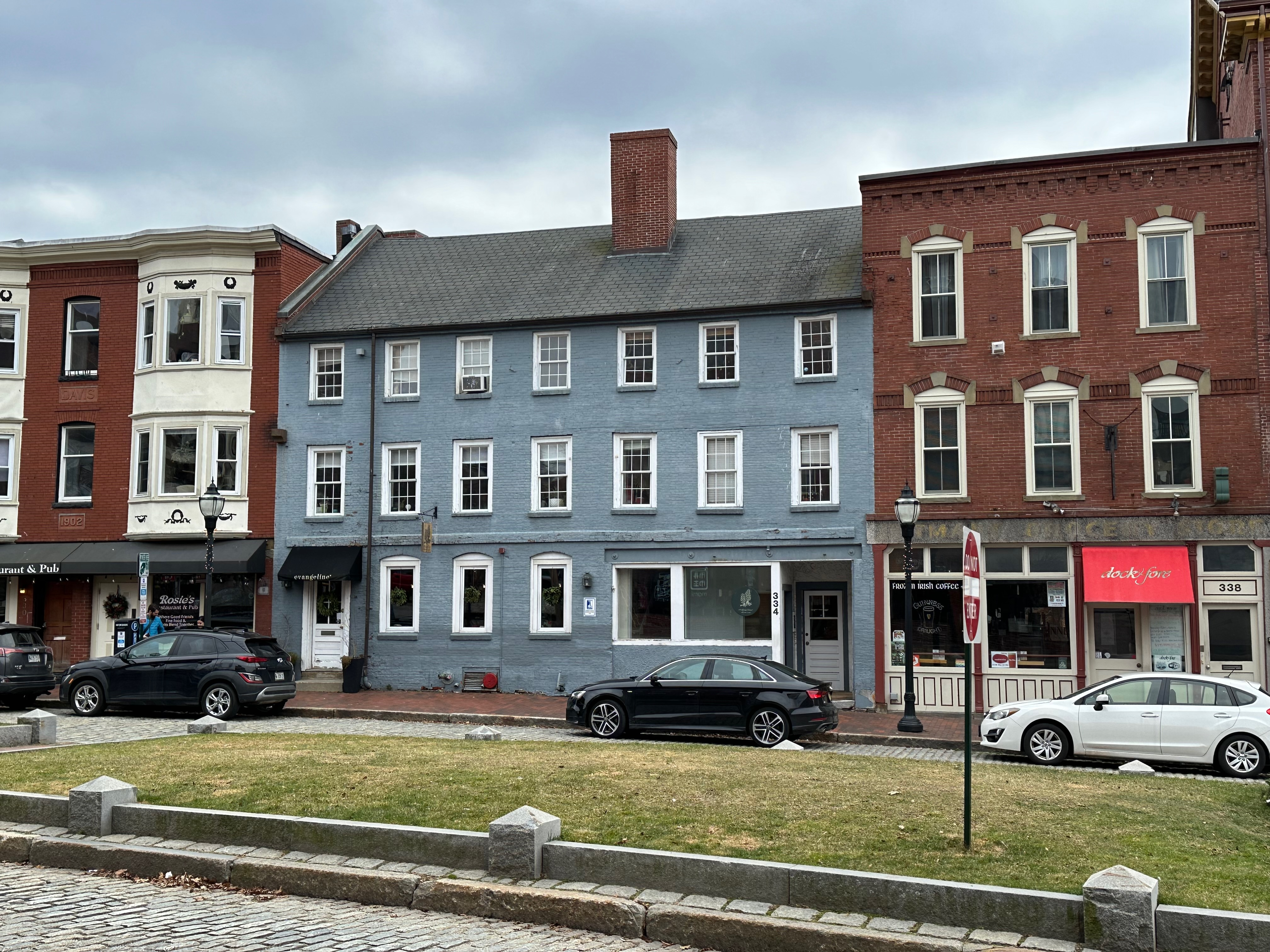
The Samuel Butts House in Portland, Maine where The Hollow Reed was located.

The restaurant was located in the Samuel Butts House, formerly known as the Mariner's House, a historic colonial-style building built in 1792. It is the second-oldest extant building on the Portland peninsula, after the Wadsworth-Longfellow House.

== Influence ==
In 2009, Maine writer Elizabeth Peavey wrote about Portland in the 1980s, "when this was a cowboy town — unprettified, unsanitized, still a little dangerous" and said "a trip to the very groovy Hollow Reed in the Old Port was a must." In 2011, the editor of Portland magazine, Colin Sargent, wrote about the past 25 years in the city and wrote that "a new wave of restaurants in Portland dazzled diners" and said The Hollow Reed was a "beloved vegetarian restaurant on Fore Street." In 2018, the chef and owner of Fore Street restaurant, Sam Hayward, told the Portland Press Herald that The Hollow Reed was one of four restaurants from the Old Port's early days that "deserve some of the credit for the city’s current reputation as a culinary destination." In 2019, organic farmer Mort Mather recalled selling to the Hollow Reed, which he called "one of the first quality restaurants in Portland’s Old Port." In 2024 journalist Avery Yale Kamila wrote that The Hollow Reed was "foundational in building Portland’s food culture."
