= Mary Cahill =

Mary Cahill may refer to:

- Mary Beth Cahill (born 1954), American political advisor, campaign manager of the John Kerry 2004 presidential campaign
- Mary F. Cahill (born 1966), American politician from Maine
