= United States Custom House (Portland, Maine) =

- U.S. Customhouse
- U.S. National Register of Historic Places
- U.S. Historic district – Contributing property
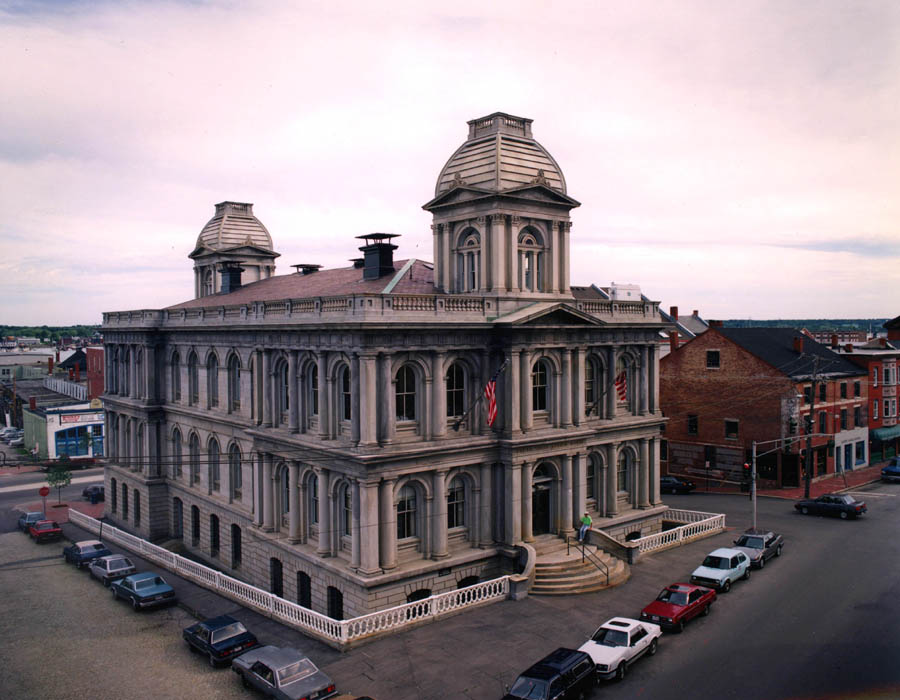
- U.S. Custom House, September 2003

- Location within Maine Location within the United States
- Map showing the location of US Customhouse, Portland
- Location: 312 Fore St., Portland, Maine
- Coordinates: 43°39′26″N 70°15′5″W
- Area: less than one acre
- Built: 1868
- Architect: Mullett, Alfred B.
- Architectural style: Renaissance, French Renaissance
- Part of: Portland Waterfront (ID74000353)
- NRHP reference No.: 73000128

Significant dates
- Added to NRHP: May 17, 1973
- Designated CP: May 2, 1974

The United States Custom House is a historic custom house at 312 Fore Street in downtown Portland, Maine. It was built from 1867–1872 to house offices of the United States Customs Service, and was listed on the National Register of Historic Places in 1973.

== Building history ==
Located near Portland's waterfront, the U.S. Custom House is a testament to the city's maritime history. It was built to accommodate the city's growing customs business, which, by 1866, was collecting $900,000 annually in customs duties—making Portland one of the most significant seaports in the country. The building is typical of the notable designs completed under the direction of Alfred B. Mullett, Supervising Architect of the Treasury from 1865 to 1874. Constructed between 1867 and 1872, the U.S. Custom House combines elements of the Second Empire and Renaissance Revival styles. The need for the new U.S. Custom House was exacerbated by the Great Fire of July 4, 1866. The fire destroyed the Exchange Building—which had previously housed the customs office, post office and courts—as well as 1,800 other buildings in the center of the city.

Although federal funds for the construction of buildings were limited during the post-Civil War period, the importance of maintaining Portland's customs business and rebuilding the city mandated the construction of the new government facility. Plans for designing the new U.S. Custom House were completed in 1866. Mullett was commissioned to design the new building, as well as a new post office and courthouse (no longer extant). Construction took five years to complete amid delays in obtaining granite for the upper stories.

The U.S. Custom House is the best remaining example of Mullett's work in the state of Maine and continued to serve its original function until U.S. Customs and Border Protection moved out in 2012. A major renovation was completed in 2013 and the building now houses several other federal agencies. It was listed in the National Register of Historic Places in 1973.

== Architecture ==
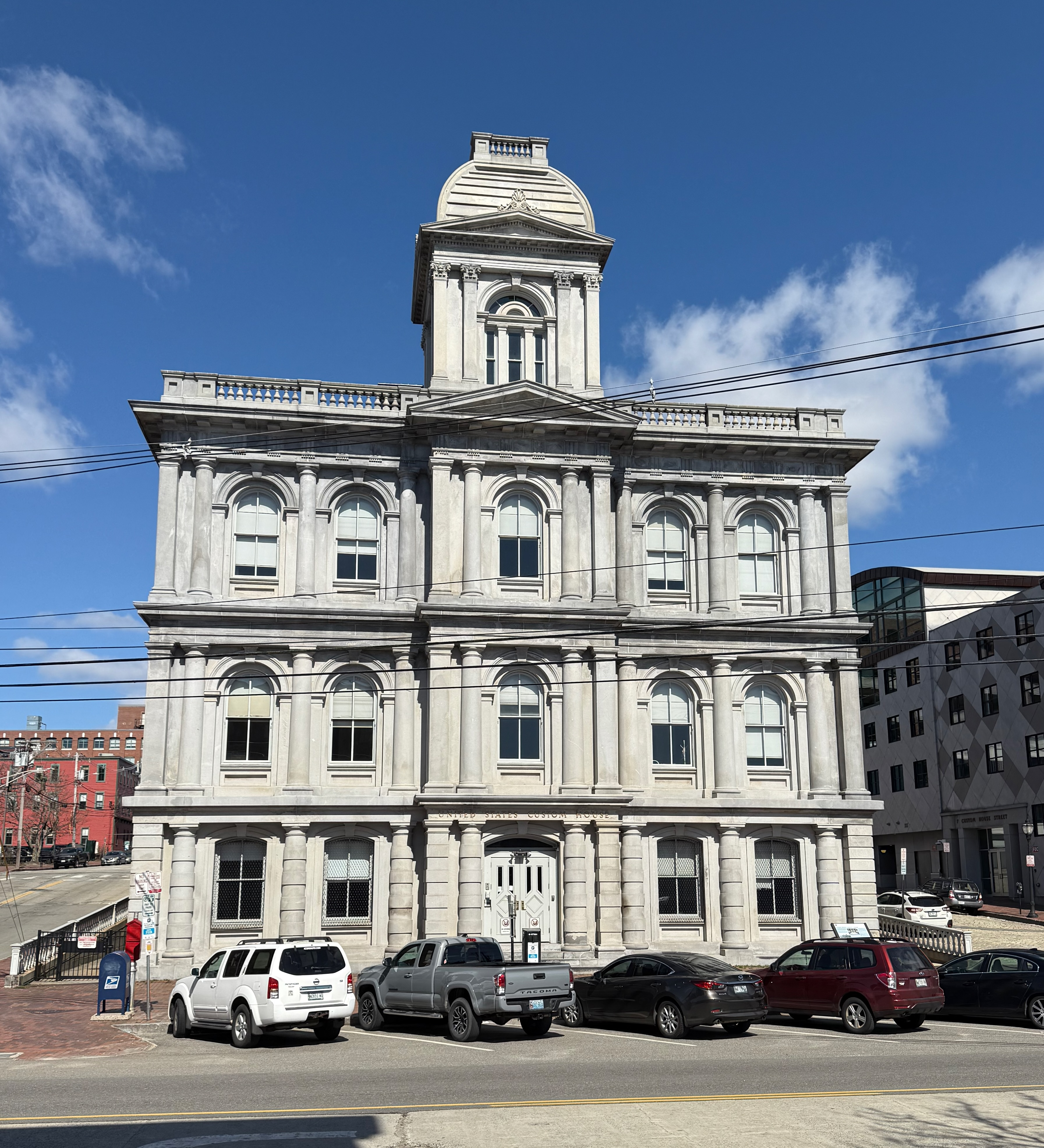
Pictured from Commercial Street

The U.S. Custom House is a skillful blend of the Renaissance Revival and Second Empire styles, which were popular in the United States during the mid- to late 19th century. Its original design is largely intact. The three-story, free-standing, I-shaped structure is constructed of New Hampshire granite with a slate-shingled hipped roof. These fireproof materials were chosen in response to the 1866 fire.

The building rests on a sloping lot that forms an embankment along the sides and the Fore Street entrance of the building. A heavy cast-iron railing, designed of tangent ovals, rests on top of the embankment. The basement level is accented with a rusticated granite exterior finish.

The U.S. Custom House has a shallow I-shaped plan, with projecting pedimented entry pavilions on the Fore Street and Commercial Street facades. The entire building is dominated by large and handsome rhythmic, round-headed windows with simple keystones. The window openings are flanked by engaged Doric columns on the first and second stories. Square pilasters mark the corners of the pavilions and the facades. A cornice and balustrade surround the entire building. The cornice features ornamental triglyphs (three vertical bands separated by V-shaped grooves).

Distinctive twin, square cupolas rise above the pedimented pavilions. Double Corinthian order pilasters flank arched Venetian windows, each of which is capped with a shallow pediment. The cupolas' distinctive mansard roofs are a defining feature of the Second Empire style.

The building is organized around the grand two-story customs hall, which is the building's public showplace and occupies the central portions of the first and second floors. The marble floor of the hall is laid with a sophisticated checkerboard pattern. Two counters run the length of the room and are fashioned of several different types of marble that were quarried on an island in Lake Champlain. These include a dark veined marble for the base; a red variegated marble for the pilasters, cornice and panels; a jet-black marble for the beading around the panels; and a dove-gray marble for the counters. Encircling the hall at the second floor is a narrow gallery with a decorative iron rail. The gallery is ornamented with symbols relating to commerce in the United States, including corn and tobacco leaf motifs and dolphins flanked by oak and olive leaves.

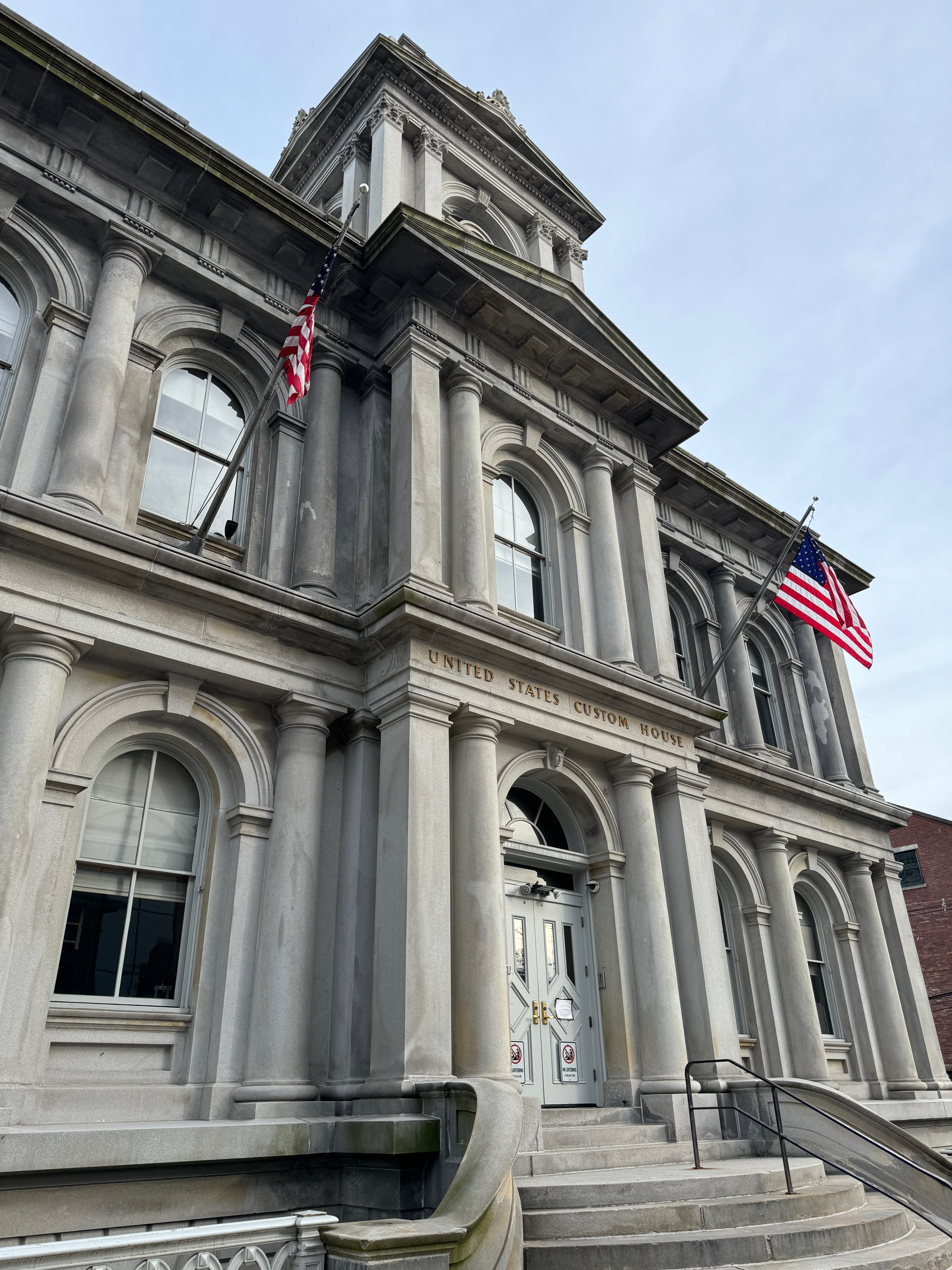
Fore Street facade

The ceiling of the customs hall is highly ornamented. A large plaster cove rises from the second-floor openings to an elaborate plaster cornice and coffered ceiling. Groin (cross) vaults over each second floor-opening extend from the cove, and the ceiling beams are decorated with a Greek key pattern and bosses (elaborate joints) at beam intersections.

An eight-foot, walnut, pedestal-mounted counter capped with a spherical clock stands at the center of the customs hall. The counter contains an octagonal writing surface decorated with flutes, bosses, a collar, and modified Ionic order scrolls.

The original walnut woodwork is still intact throughout the building, as are the Italian marble fireplaces in the offices located at both ends of the building. The offices, which are more simply designed than the main hall, consist of plaster walls, and walnut baseboards, window surrounds, and doors. The original 2 story vault for storing valuables also remains.

The U.S. Custom House has experienced only minor changes since it was constructed, and therefore exhibits a high degree of architectural integrity. The most notable alteration to the structure has occurred in the interior customs hall, where the original gas chandeliers have been replaced with the current surface-mounted ceiling fixtures. The basement was converted into office and dormitory space for the U.S. Coast Guard in 1983. The majority of the building's distinctive elements, such as the marbled checkerboard floor and decorative staircases, remain in place. In 1998, the aluminum doors, which were installed during the 1960s at the main entrances, were replaced with wooden doors similar in design and color to the original doors to the building.

== Significant events ==
- 1866: Supervising Architect of the Treasury, Alfred B. Mullet, designs the U.S. Custom House.
- 1867–1872: The U.S. Custom House is constructed.
- 1950s: The U.S. General Services Administration acquires the building.
- 1973: The U.S. Custom House is listed in the National Register of Historic Places.
- 1983: The basement is converted into office and dormitory space for the U.S. Coast Guard.
- 1998: Restoration of the building begins with restoration of the entrance to replicate its original appearance.
- 2012: U.S. Customs relocates from the building.
- 2013: Restoration of the building completes.

== Building facts ==
- Architect: Alfred B. Mullett, Supervising Architect of the Treasury
- Construction Dates: 1867–1872
- Landmark Status: Listed in the National Register of Historic Places
- Location: 312 Fore Street, Portland, Maine
- Architectural Style: Second Empire/Renaissance Revival
- Primary Materials: New Hampshire granite and slate tile roof
- Prominent Feature: Customs Hall

== See also ==
- National Register of Historic Places listings in Portland, Maine
