= Carroll L. Beedy =

American politician

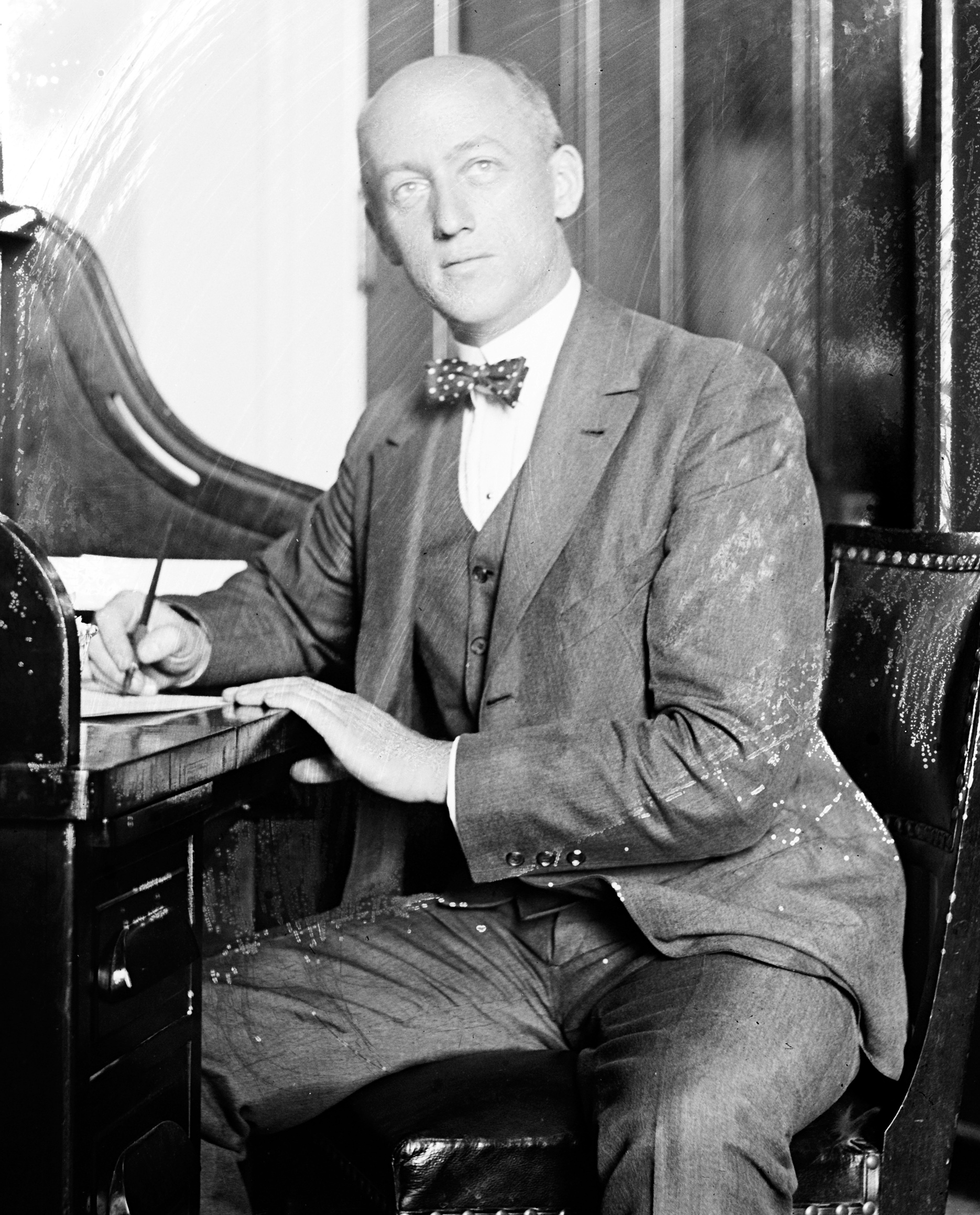

Member of the U.S. House of Representatives from Maine's 1st district
- In office March 4, 1921 – January 3, 1935
- Preceded by: Louis B. Goodall
- Succeeded by: Simon M. Hamlin

Personal details
- Born: August 3, 1880 Phillips, Maine
- Died: August 30, 1947 (aged 67) Washington, D.C.
- Party: Republican

Carroll Lynwood Beedy (August 3, 1880 – August 30, 1947) was a U.S. representative from Maine from 1921 to 1935.

He was born in Phillips, Franklin County, Maine, on August 3, 1880. He attended the public schools of Lewiston, Androscoggin County, Maine and graduated from Bates College, Lewiston, Maine, in 1903 and from the law department of Yale University in 1906. He was admitted to the bar in 1907 and commenced practice in Portland, Maine. He became the prosecuting attorney of Cumberland County from 1917 to 1921. In the Republican primary prior to the election, Beedy defeated Mayor of Portland Charles Bailey Clarke by 19 votes. He was subsequently elected to the 67th and the six succeeding Congresses (March 4, 1921 - January 3, 1935). He was also chairman of the Committee on Mileage (68th and 69th Congresses), Committee on Expenditures in the Department of Labor (69th Congress), Committee on Elections No. 1 (70th and 71st Congresses). He was an unsuccessful candidate for reelection in 1934 to the 74th Congress. He then practiced in law in Washington, D.C., until his death there August 30, 1947. Beedy was an active Freemason. He was interred in Portland's Evergreen Cemetery.

U.S. House of Representatives
Preceded by Louis B. Goodall	Member of the U.S. House of Representatives from Maine's 1st congressional district March 4, 1921 – January 3, 1935	Succeeded by Simon M. Hamlin
