= Senator Connell =

Senator Connell may refer to:

- Kathleen S. Connell (born 1937), Rhode Island politician
- Pat Connell (fl. 2010s), Montana State Senate

== See also ==
- Senator Connelly (disambiguation)
