= Portland Regency Hotel & Spa =

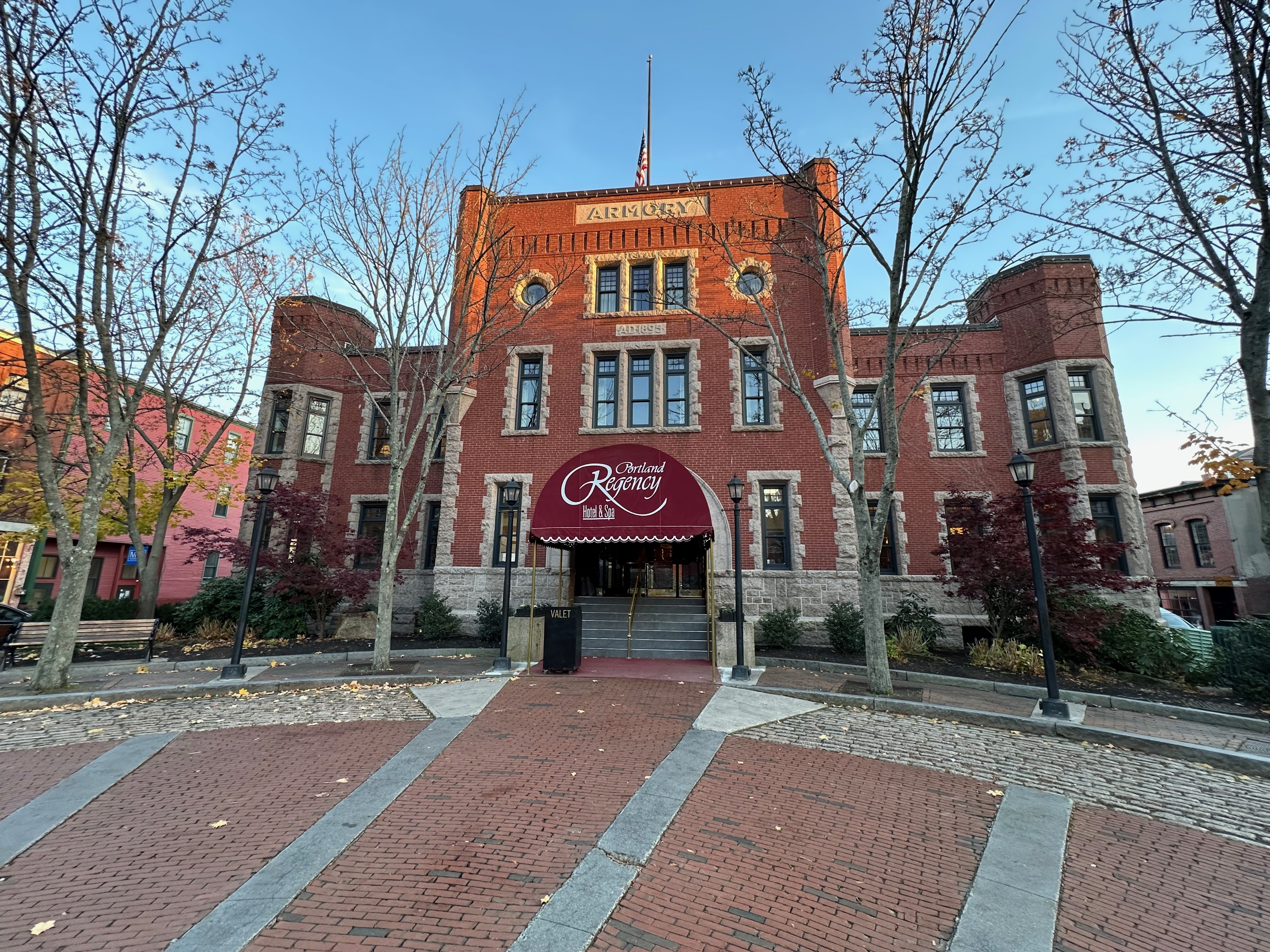
- The hotel's main entrance (2023)

- Location within Maine

General information
- Location: 20 Milk Street, Portland, Maine, U.S.
- Coordinates: 43.6571°N 70.2528°W
- Completed: 1895 (131 years ago)

The State of Maine Armory (also known as Portland Armory and now as Portland Regency Hotel & Spa) is an historic building in Portland, Maine's Old Port District. The brick building spans from its entrance at 20 Milk Street to Fore Street at its rear and parallels Market Street and Silver Street on its west and east sides. The historic Boothby Square is located on Fore Street behind the hotel.

== History ==
The State of Maine Armory was designed by prominent local architect Frederick A. Tompson and built in 1895, on land donated to the city ninety years earlier by Joseph Holt Ingraham, for use by the Maine National Guard. Upon its opening, the then-mayor of Portland, James Phinney Baxter, said: "The possession of quarters in a prominent place, where the men would always be under the public eye, would be the means of improving the morale of the force." In 1941, the National Guard abandoned the building, but it was used to house troops during World War II as well as a recreation center. After the war, the structure was used as a warehouse until it was converted into the current hotel in 1987.

The 2020 renovation followed one in 2012 that cost around $2.8 million.

Milk Street, on which the street stands, is named for Deacon James Milk (1710–1772), who had a carpenter's shop nearby.

The hotel is a member of Historic Hotels of America.

== Hotel restaurants ==
The main-floor restaurant is named eighteen95, as a nod to the year the building was completed. Its basement-level lounge is named The Armory. A whiskey bar, Ironside, was added on the lobby level during renovations in 2020 (Portland Armory supplied the USS Constitution, nicknamed Old Ironsides, with ammunition).
