= Andrew L. Emerson =

American politician

Andrew Leonard Emerson (1803- March 23, 1835) was an American lawyer and politician from Maine.

Emerson was born in York, Massachusetts in 1803. He graduated from Phillips Exeter Academy before attending Harvard College, from which he graduated in 1820. He then studied law at Harvard Law School before finishing in the office of Simon Greenleaf. Emerson served two single year terms in the Maine House of Representatives (1828; 1829) and was the first Mayor of Portland, Maine in 1832. The city had previously been organized as a town. However, Emerson was forced to resign in November of that year due to tuberculosis. He died in March 1835 in Florida and is buried at Western Cemetery beside his wife. The Emerson School, built in 1897–1898 in the Munjoy Hill neighborhood, is named in Andrew Emerson's honor. It was used until the 1970s, when it was converted into affordable housing.
