= Samuel Butts House =

Historic house in Portland, Maine

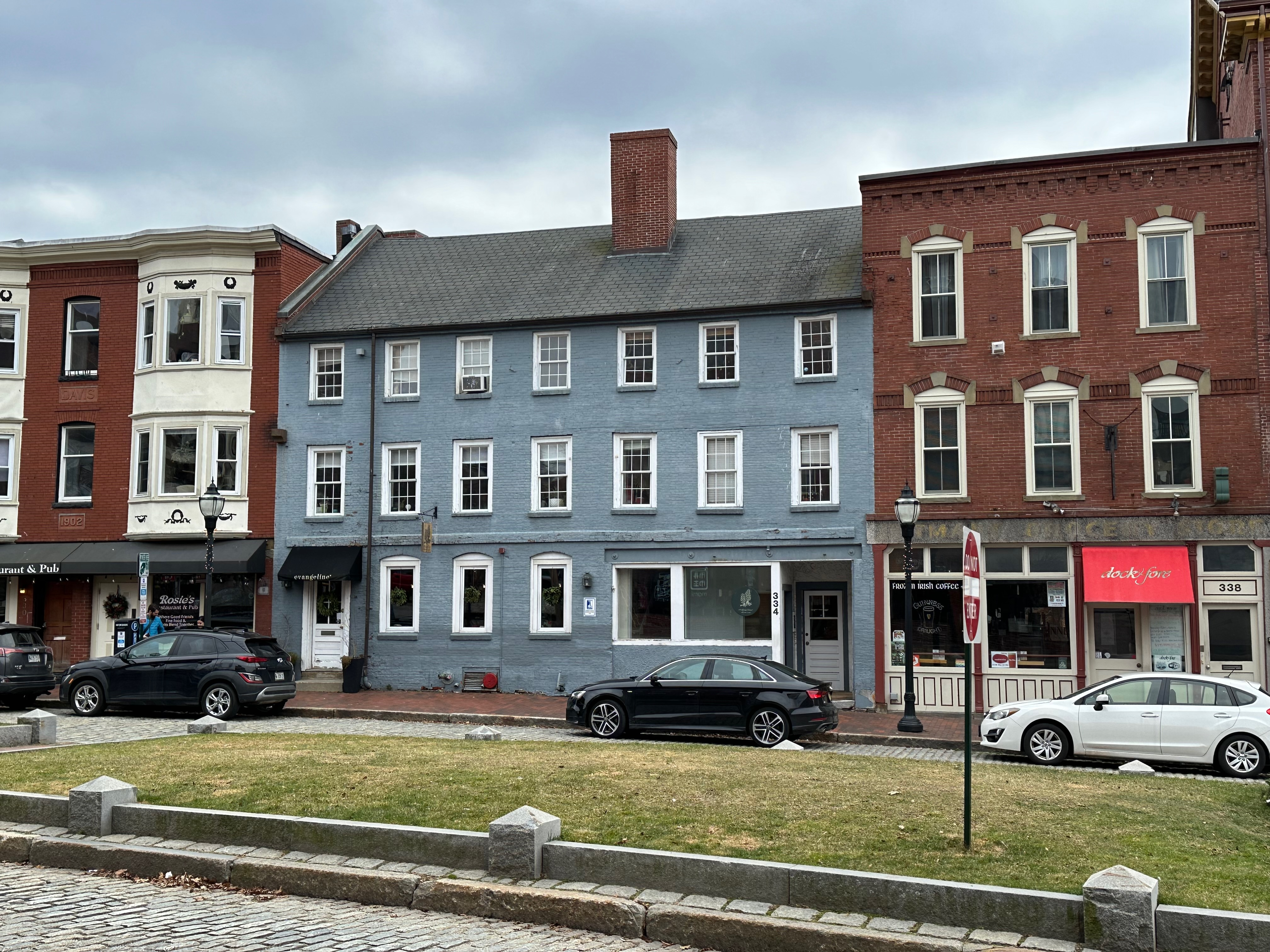
- The building in 2024
- Interactive map of the Samuel Butts House area
- Former names: Mariner's House
- Alternative names: Samuel Butts House and Store

General information
- Location: Portland, Maine, U.S., 334 Fore Street
- Coordinates: 43.65686°N 70.25177°W
- Completed: 1792 (234 years ago)

Technical details
- Floor count: 3

The Samuel Butts House (also known as the Samuel Butts House and Store; formerly known as the Mariner's House) is a historic colonial-style building in Portland, Maine, United States. Located in Boothby Square, on Fore Street, the building was completed in 1792, when Fore Street was at the shoreline of the Fore River estuary. It is the second-oldest extant building on the Portland peninsula, after the Wadsworth-Longfellow House, which pre-dates it by around six years. It is believed its third storey was added well after the building was completed.

Samuel Butts (1760–1838) was a tailor who moved to Portland from Boston in 1784.

== History ==
The building survived the Portland fire of 1866.

A 22-room hotel occupied the building in the first half of the 20th century.

From 1974 to 1981, The Hollow Reed restaurant occupied the storefront.
