= William Willis (Maine politician) =

American politician

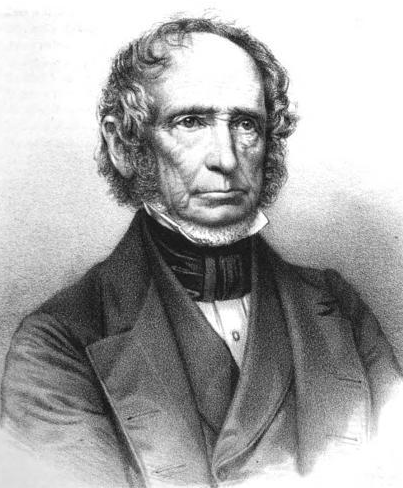
- Born: August 31, 1794; Haverhill, Massachusetts, United States
- Died: February 17, 1870 (aged 75); Portland, Maine, United States
- Education: Harvard College
- Occupations: Lawyer; Historian; Politician
- Known for: Mayor of Portland, Maine (1857)

William Willis (August 31, 1794 – February 17, 1870) was a lawyer, historian, and politician from Portland, Maine. He was the partner of William Pitt Fessenden. He was member of the Maine State Senate in 1855 and Mayor of Portland in 1857, president of the Maine Historical Society (1856–1865), and president of the Maine Central Railroad. In 1864, he was elected a member of the American Antiquarian Society.

Bowdoin College, which granted him an honorary degree in 1867, has a small collection of his correspondence, drafts of his writing, and estate information.

Willis died in 1870, aged 75.

== Selected bibliography ==
- Willis, William (1833). The History of Portland from its First Settlement. Portland, Maine: Day, Fraser & Co.
- Willis, William (1863). A History of the Law, the Courts, and the Lawyers of Maine, from Its First Colonization to the Early Part of the Present Century. Portland, Maine: Bailey & Noyes.
