= Senator Connelly =

Senator Connelly or Connolly may refer to:

- Henry C. Connelly (1832–1912), New York State Senate
- Michael Connelly (Illinois politician), Illinois State Senate
- Mike Connolly (Iowa politician) (born 1945), Iowa State Senate
- Richard B. Connolly (1810–1880), New York State Senate

== See also ==
- Tom Connally (1877–1963), U.S. Senator from Texas from 1929 to 1953.
- Matt Connealy (born 1951), Nebraska State Senate
- John H. Conolly (1935–1988), Illinois State Senate
- Senator Conley (disambiguation)
- Senator Connell (disambiguation)
