= Levi Cutter =

American businessman politician

Levi Cutter (May 22, 1774 – March 2, 1856) was an American businessperson and politician from Maine. Cutter served as the fourth mayor of Portland from 1834 to 1840.

Cutter was born and raised in North Yarmouth, Massachusetts (in the part of Massachusetts that became Maine in 1820), where he lived until 1803, when he moved to Portland. In September 1796, Cutter married Lucretia Mitchell. The couple were married until Mitchell's death in 1827 and had ten children. He married again in 1833 to Ruth (Kendall) Jenkins, who died in 1862. Jenkins and Cutter had no children.

During his mayoral administration, Portland built Exchange Street and laid out what became the Western Promenade and the Eastern Promenade. Portland's Cutter Street, which connects Eastern Promenade to East End Beach, is named for Cutter.
