= William MacVane =

American politician and surgeon (1915–2010)

William L. MacVane Jr.

Mayor of Portland, Maine
- In office 1970–1971
- Preceded by: Donald Slipp
- Succeeded by: Gerard Conley Sr.

Personal details
- Born: June 12, 1915 Portland, Maine
- Died: August 1, 2010 (aged 95)
- Spouse: Margaret MacVane (2nd)
- Education: Williams College; Johns Hopkins School of Medicine
- Profession: Surgeon, politician

William Leslie MacVane Jr. (June 12, 1915 – August 1, 2010) was an American surgeon and politician. MacVane assisted in the first open heart surgery performed in Maine in 1959 and served as the mayor of Portland, Maine, for one term in 1971.

== Biography ==
=== Early life ===
MacVane was born on State Street in Portland, Maine, to William L. MacVane Sr. and Bertha May Achorn. He attended Hebron Academy, a college preparatory school in Hebron, Maine. MacVane's interest in medicine began in his teens, when he underwent a mastoidectomy. The doctors asked MacVane to accompany them on their rounds during his recovery.

MacVane went on to earn a bachelor's degree from Williams College in Massachusetts and a medical degree from Johns Hopkins School of Medicine in Baltimore.

=== Surgical career ===
Following medical school, he was an intern and then assistant resident in surgery at Union Memorial Hospital, Baltimore. During World War II, MacVane served as an Army Officer in the 61st Portable Surgical Unit. He was stationed in the Philippines and Japan during and after the war. MacVane was a recipient of the Bronze Star for performing "major surgery under adverse conditions."

After World War II, MacVane was honorably discharged from the Army in 1946 as a Major. He returned to Maine, becoming the first surgical resident at Maine General Hospital in Portland. Additionally, MacVane became an attending surgeon at other hospitals in Maine, including Portland City Hospital, the Maine Medical Center, Mercy Hospital and Togus V.A. Hospital. He briefly left Maine for two years in the early 1950s. He worked as both a thoracic surgery resident at the V.A. Hospital in Oteen, North Carolina, and a thoracic surgery fellow at George Washington University Hospital in Washington, D.C., from 1953 until 1955.

He once again returned to Maine in 1955, where he practiced thoracic and general surgery. He assisted Emerson Drake in Maine's first open heart surgery, which was performed at Maine Medical Center in 1959. He continued to work as a thoracic surgeon and consultant in hospitals throughout the state. MacVane also served on the executive committee of Mercy Hospital for eighteen years.

MacVane worked for the Joint Commission on the Accreditation of Hospitals for ten years after retiring from his surgical career. He surveyed and accredited hospitals throughout the United States, the Middle East and Europe.

=== Political career ===
MacVane was elected to the Portland, Maine City Council in 1967 representing the city's West End neighborhood. He took office in 1968 and held the office until 1977. MacVane served as the largely ceremonial Mayor of Portland for one term, from 1970 to 1971.

He was also elected to the Portland School Board and served as a member of the Portland Transit Authority.

=== Philanthropy ===
MacVane served on the boards of directors for numerous organizations, including the Portland Chapter of the American Red Cross and the Portland YMCA. He also headed or chaired the committees for the Portland Bicentennial Committee, the Portland Public Library and the Reiche School.

=== Later life ===
MacVane remained active throughout his life. He won the New England seniors badminton doubles and singles championships in 1990. He continued to attend classes at the University of Southern Maine's Osher Lifelong Learning Institute into his 90s. During his life, MacVane was a member of many Portland area organizations and societies, including Portland Rotary Club, the Masons, the Western Maine Torch Club, the Cumberland Club, Sigma Phi Society and the Portland Yacht Club.

MacVane died on August 1, 2010, at the age of 95. He was survived by three children from his 60-year marriage to his wife, Margaret MacVane: two daughters, Lesley MacVane and Margaret Murray and a son, Captain Forbes MacVane of the U.S. Navy. He was also survived by two children from his first marriage, William Harris and Patricia MacVane.

MacVane was the oldest living Mayor of Portland at the time of his death in 2010.
