= Neal W. Allen =

American politician and businessperson

Neal Woodside Allen (1885 – June 25, 1976) was an American politician and businessperson from Portland, Maine. He served as chairman of the Portland City Council twice (1925–26). He was elected to the first city council chosen in December 1923 after the Chamber of Commerce and Ku Klux Klan collaborated to install a council–manager government. In 1912, he purchased F. O. Bailey company, an auctioneering company which he held until his death. In 1942, he was one of the founding appointees to the Portland Planning Board and regularly served as its chair.

Allen was born in Portland and graduated from Phillips Exeter Academy in 1904 Bowdoin College in 1907. His parents were Charles W. Allen and Ida G. Neal (Allen). He married Margaret Stevens, who was the daughter of architect John Calvin Stevens. The pair had four sons: Charles, Frederick, Neil, Jr., and Franklin, and two daughters, Louise and Barbara. One of his children, Frederick, served in the Maine Legislature from 1944 to 1952. His grandson is former U.S. Congressman Tom Allen. He died at his home (186 Craigie Street) and is buried at Portland's Evergreen Cemetery.
