= Wadsworth Hall =

Historic house in Maine, United States

- U.S. National Register of Historic Places
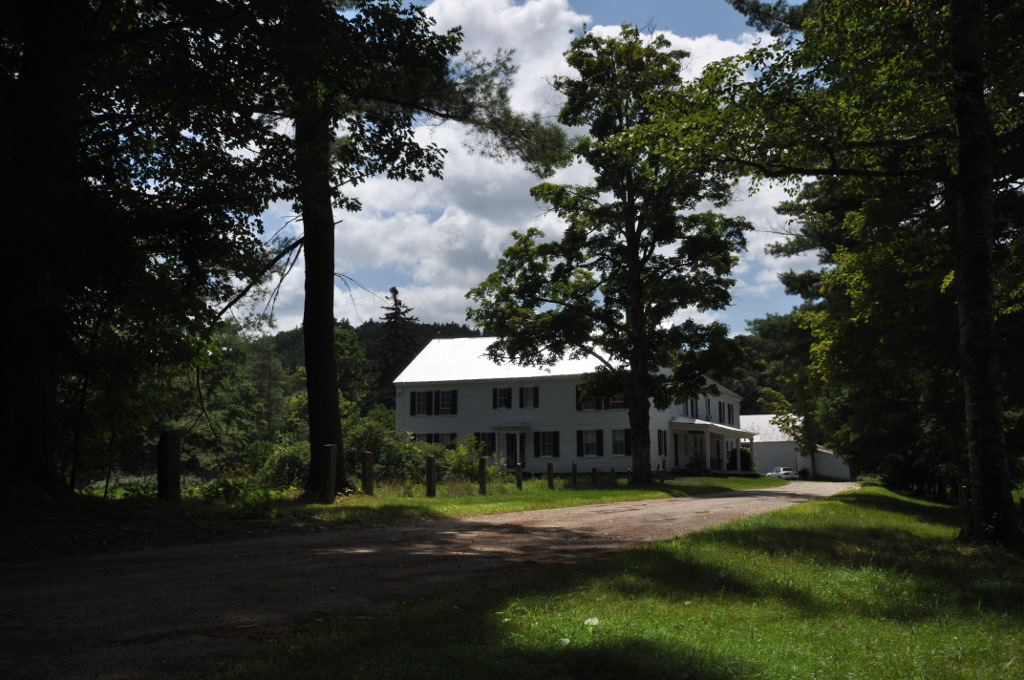

- Location within Maine Location within the United States
- Nearest city: Hiram, Maine, United States
- Coordinates: 43.86407°N 70.81188°W
- Area: 5.8 acres (2.3 ha)
- Built: 1800
- Architect: Jewett, Stephen; Smith, Theophilus
- Architectural style: Federal
- NRHP reference No.: 74000182
- Added to NRHP: January 21, 1974

Wadsworth Hall, also known as the Peleg Wadsworth House, is a historic house at the end of Douglas Road in Hiram, Maine, United States. A massive structure for a rural setting, it was built for General Peleg Wadsworth between 1800 and 1807 on a large tract of land granted to him for his service in the American Revolutionary War. Wadsworth was the leading citizen of Hiram, and important town meetings took place at the house. He was also the grandfather of poet Henry Wadsworth Longfellow, who visited the estate as a youth. The house remains in the hands of Wadsworth descendants. The house was listed on the National Register of Historic Places in 1974.

== Description ==
The main block of the house is a rectangular 2 1/2-story wood-frame structure set on a massive granite foundation, with a gabled roof. Its main facade is seven bays wide, notably larger than the five more typically found in rural settings. The main entrance is centered on this face, sheltered by a 19th-century portico. A pair of small windows are above the doorway, with larger paired windows on either side on the second level. The left side of the house has three windows on each of three levels, and a doorway leading to the cellar. The right side has two windows on each of three levels. A two-story ell extends to the rear of the house, with a later two-story addition extending it further. There are a number of farm-related outbuildings, including 19th-century barns, behind the house.

The interior of the house is rustic and relatively simple. Its main feature on the first floor is a large chamber with a high ceiling, which was used by General Wadsworth for public meetings. The house is finished in plain pine boards, with modest Federal styling.

== History ==
General Wadsworth's primary residence, now known as the Wadsworth-Longfellow House and a National Historic Landmark, is located on Congress Street in Portland, and was built in 1785–86. Wadsworth was granted 7,800 acres (3,200 ha) by the state in 1790 for his war service; this property extended from the Ossipee River to the Saco River in what is now the town of Hiram. The house was built between 1800 and 1807 by Stephen Jewett, a carpenter, and Theophilus Smith, a mason, both of whom were from nearby Cornish. After its completion, Wadsworth gave his Portland home to his daughter Zilpah and her husband Stephen Longfellow, parents of the poet Henry Wadsworth Longfellow. Longfellow is known to have frequently summered at his grandfather's estate as a child.

Wadsworth, in his role as a leading citizen in Hiram, opened his house for meetings and town functions, and even used the large hall for militia drills during bad weather. The house and surviving property retain a rural setting, accessed via a narrow dirt road.

== See also ==
- National Register of Historic Places listings in Oxford County, Maine
