= Wadsworth-Longfellow House =

Historic house in Maine, United States

- U.S. National Register of Historic Places
- U.S. National Historic Landmark
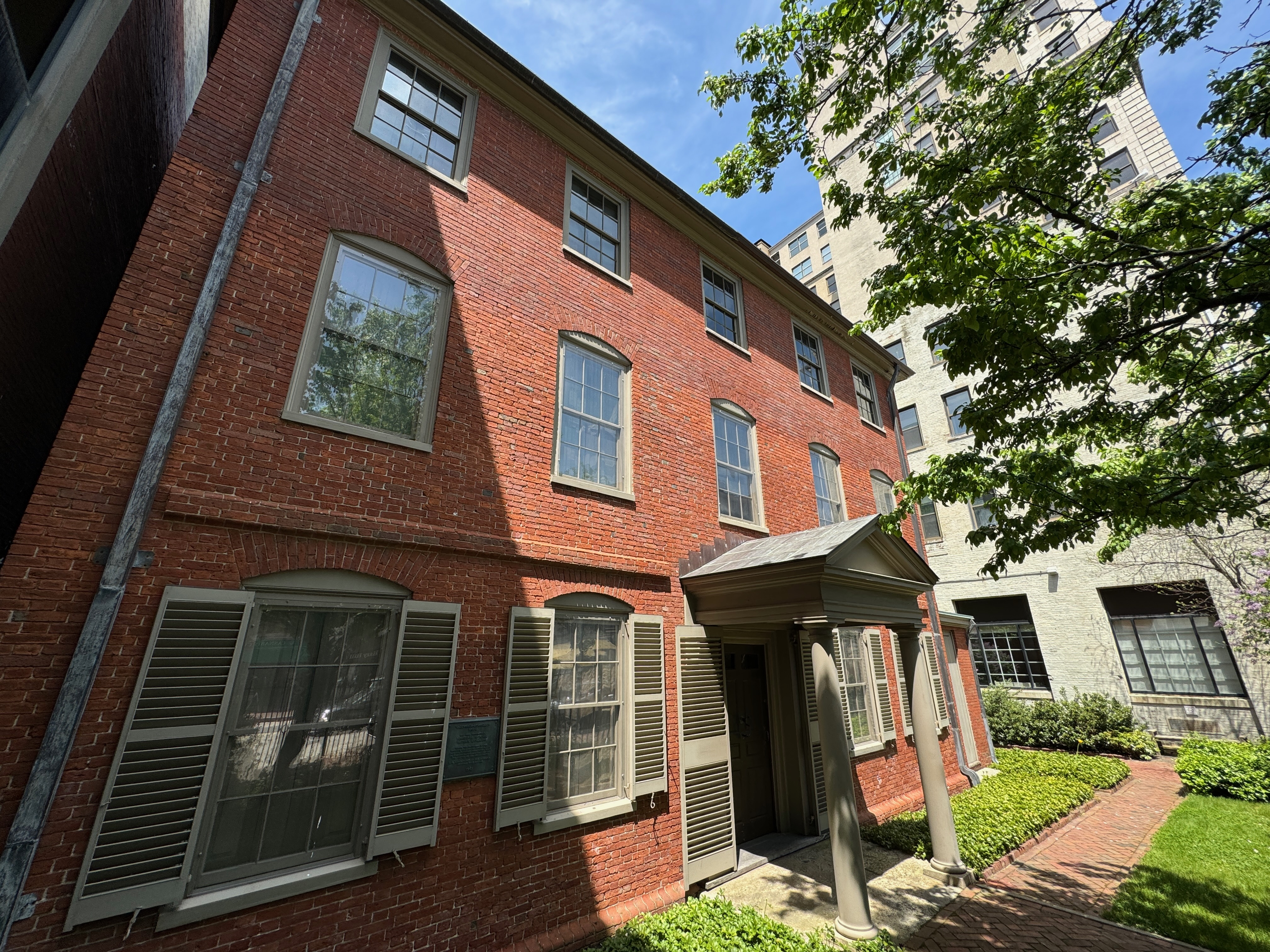
- The front of the Wadsworth-Longfellow House

- Location within Maine Location within the United States
- Location: 489 Congress St; Portland, Maine
- Coordinates: 43°39′25″N 70°15′37″W
- Architect: Peleg Wadsworth
- NRHP reference No.: 66000090

Significant dates
- Added to NRHP: October 15, 1966
- Designated NHL: December 29, 1962

The Wadsworth-Longfellow House is a historic house and museum in Portland, Maine, United States. It is located at 489 Congress Street and is operated by the Maine Historical Society. It was designated a National Historic Landmark in 1962, and administratively added to the National Register of Historic Places in 1966. The house is open daily to public from May through October (half days on Sundays). An admission fee is charged.

== History ==
The house has both historical and literary importance, as it is both the oldest standing structure on the Portland peninsula and the childhood home of American poet Henry Wadsworth Longfellow (1807–1882).

American Revolutionary War General Peleg Wadsworth built the house between 1785 and 1786, the first wholly brick dwelling in Portland. Wadsworth raised ten children in the two-story structure with a pitched roof before retiring to the family farm in Hiram, Maine, in 1807. His daughter Zilpah and her husband Stephen Longfellow IV were married in the house. Their son, Henry Wadsworth Longfellow, was born nearby at the home of an aunt, Stephen's sister, on February 27, 1807. The home was a three-story Federal architecture-style home at the corner of Fore and Hancock Streets. Young Longfellow did not move with his parents to the Wadsworth-Longfellow House until he was eight months old, but spent the next 35 years there. The Longfellows added today's third story in 1815.

On September 10, 2001, the eve of the September 11 attacks, two of the soon-to-be hijackers, Mohamed Atta and Abdulaziz al-Omari, visited the Wadsworth-Longfellow House in the afternoon.

== Preservation ==
Anne Longfellow Pierce (1810–1901) was the last family member to live in the house. She deliberately kept the house much as it was in Peleg Wadsworth's time, but is perhaps best remembered for growing oranges in the window. Her will stipulated that the house, lot, and many furnishings be given to the Maine Historical Society upon her death.

Pierce died in 1901 and the Maine Historical Society opened the home to the public within a year. At the time, only one other American author's home was owned by an organization committed to its preservation, specifically the John Greenleaf Whittier Homestead in Haverhill, Massachusetts.

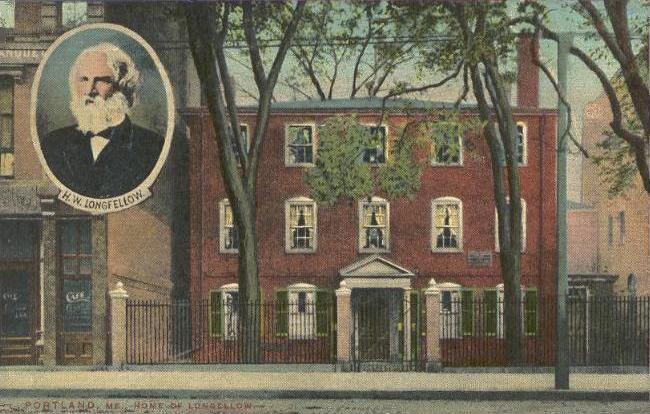
Postcard showing the house, c. 1910

== Longfellow Garden ==
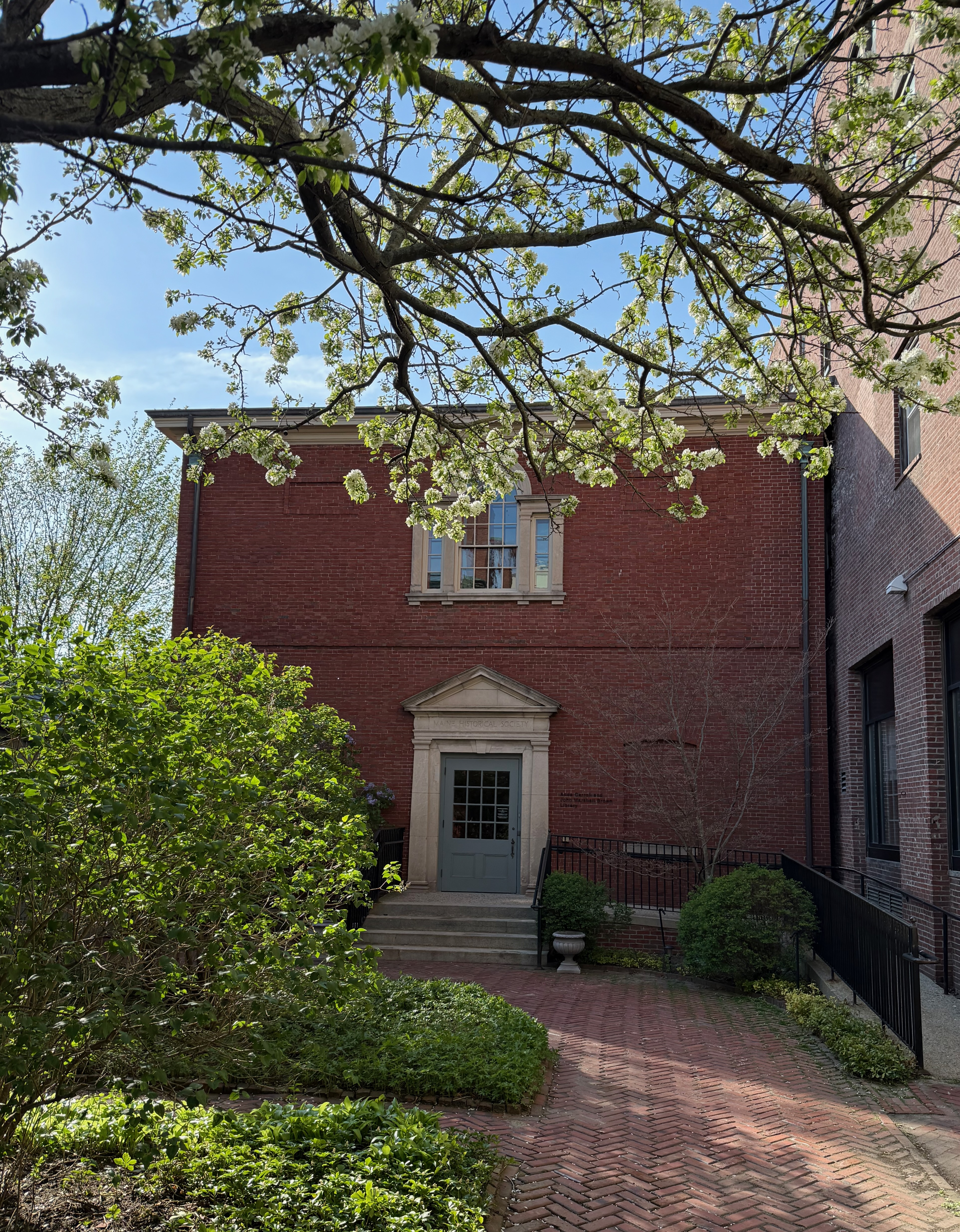
The Alice Carroll and John Marshall Brown Library, located behind the Wadsworth-Longfellow House, is operated by the Maine Historical Society.

Pearl Wing started the Longfellow Garden Club in 1924 to establish the Longfellow Garden located alongside the Wadsworth-Longfellow House. The Longfellow Garden Club engaged landscape architect Myron Lamb to design the Colonial Revival style Longfellow Garden located in what was once part of the Longfellow family farmyard. The garden was replanted in 2007 after renovations to Maine Historical Library. A lilac tree mentioned by Anne Longfellow is located in the back corner alongside the library.

A Children's Gate designed by Alexander Wadsworth Longfellow, nephew of Henry Wadsworth Longfellow, was installed in the 1930s. The gate was removed in the 1960s and restored in 2012.

== See also ==
- Longfellow House–Washington's Headquarters National Historic Site in Cambridge, Massachusetts
- Samuel Butts House, the second-oldest extant building on the peninsula
- List of National Historic Landmarks in Maine
- National Register of Historic Places listings in Portland, Maine
