= John Deering (politician) =

American politician

John W. Deering (1833- April 26, 1904) was an American politician from Maine. Peering, a Democrat, served two single year terms as the Mayor of Portland, Maine (1883 and 1885).

Deering was born in Saco, Maine in 1833 and became a sailor. He eventually became a captain involved in commerce in the Mediterranean Sea. In 1867, he settled in Portland and became active in city politics. He was elected as a city alderman as a Republican, but later became a staunch Democrat.

During the first term of U.S. President Grover Cleveland, Deering was appointed Collector of the Port of Portland, a powerful patronage position.

He died at his home at 89 West Street near the Western Promenade in April 1904 and is buried in the Deering family lot at Evergreen Cemetery.
