= Carroll Chaplin =

American politician and lawyer

Carroll Sherman Chaplin (April 28, 1882 – August 9, 1953) was an American lawyer and politician in Portland, Maine.

Chaplin was born in Portland, Maine and attended public schools in Portland. He graduated from the University of Maine in 1904 and from Harvard Law School in 1908. He was admitted to the Maine bar in October 1908. A Republican, he served as Mayor of Portland, Maine from 1922 to 1923.

== Political career ==
Chaplin opposed the Ku Klux Klan in the September 1923 special election which successfully sought to change Portland city government by eliminating the elected mayor position, partisan elections and elections by ward in favor of a five person at large city council with the day-to-day business of Portland government being led by an unelected city manager. The Klan's election over Chaplin and Jewish, Irish and African-American activists marked a major win for the KKK in the region. Chaplin had proposed a competing measure which had sought to bridge the demands of the KKK while retaining the directly elected mayor and bicameral council government but his plan finished with just 810 votes out of approximately 15,000 total.

=== Probate Judge ===
Chaplin was elected Cumberland County Judge of Probate in 1928 and re-elected to that position every four years until his death in 1953.

== Personal ==
Chaplin was resident of the stately Western Promenade section of the West End neighborhood. Chaplin married Bessie L. Whittier in 1915. He was a Congregationalist. His parents were Ashbel Chaplin and Huldah M. (Peabody) Chaplin. He died at his summer home in Cape Elizabeth, Maine in August 1953. His funeral services were held at the nearby Williston-West Church and Parish House. He is buried at Evergreen Cemetery.
