= Edward B. Winslow =

American industrialist and politician (1846–1936)

Edward Brackett Winslow (September 20, 1846 – November 6, 1936) was an American industrialist, banker and politician from Maine. He served on the Governor's Council for one year (1911) after the election of fellow Democrat Frederick W. Plaisted.

Winslow was born in the Deering section of Westbrook, Maine, which was annexed to Portland in 1899. His family were prominent Quakers and were involved in the establishment of the area's first Quaker society and first meeting house, which was in Falmouth near the Presumpscot River. He graduated from Westbrook Seminary. After graduation, he went to work in his father's company, Portland Stoneware Company.

A staunch Democrat, he was nominated for governor in 1896 but declined because of disagreements with Silver Democrats.

In June 1932, Winslow was awarded an honorary Master of Arts by the University of Maine after serving on the university's board of trustees from 1898 to 1911, including serving as president from 1908 to 1911. Winslow Hall, an academic building on the campus of the University of Maine built in 1909 while Winslow was president of the board of trustees, is named in his honor.

A schooner, the Edward B. Winslow, was lost off the coast of France during World War I.
