= Baxter Memorial Library =

Public library serving Gorham, Maine

Coordinates: 43.677°N 70.4417°W

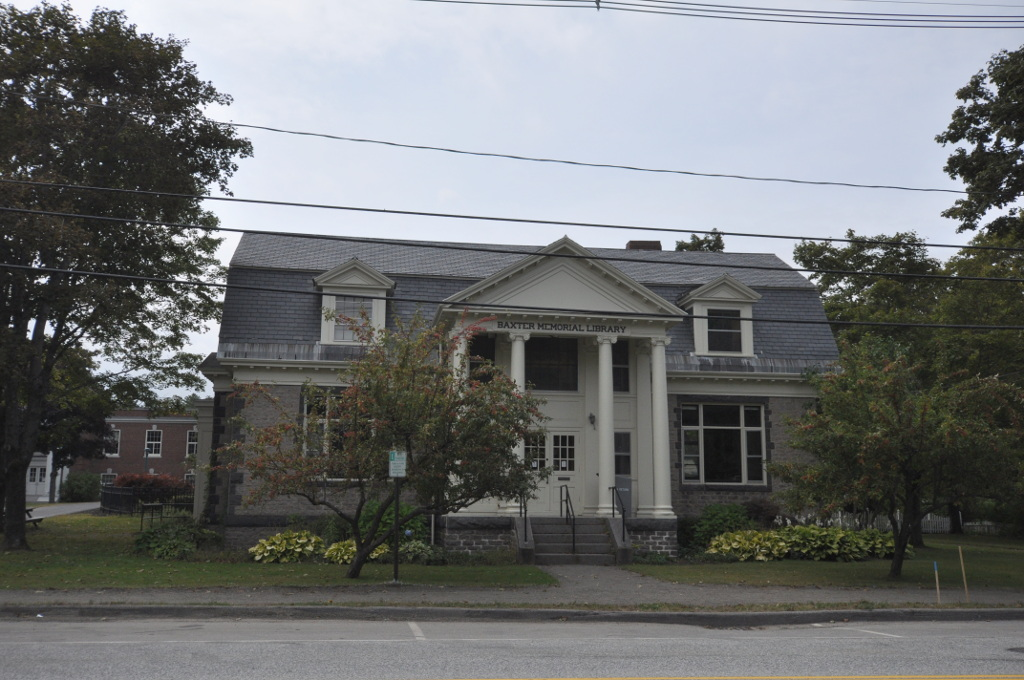
- Location: Gorham, Maine, United States
- Type: Public
- Established: 1908

Collection
- Size: 45,500

Access and use
- Circulation: 112,801
- Population served: 17,381

Other information
- Budget: $445,542 (2016)
- Director: James Rathbun
- Employees: 11
- Website: www.baxter-memorial.lib.me.us

The Baxter Memorial Library is the public library serving Gorham, Maine. It was built in 1908. The gift of James Phinney Baxter, the library building is constructed of pink granite and the interior is completed in red oak. In 2003, a 10,000 square feet (930 m^{2}) addition became the primary library.
