= James Phinney Baxter =

American politician and businessman

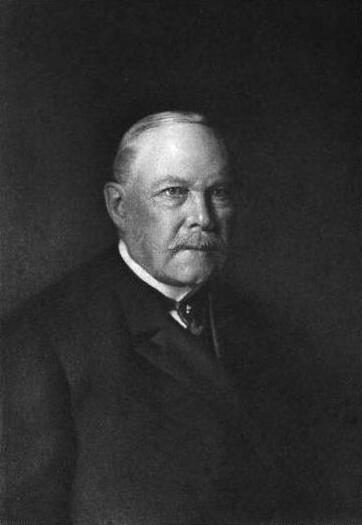

38th and 42nd Mayor of Portland
- In office 1893–1896
- Preceded by: Darius H. Ingraham
- Succeeded by: Charles H. Randall
- In office 1904–1905
- Preceded by: Frederic E. Boothby
- Succeeded by: Nathan Clifford

Personal details
- Born: March 23, 1831 Gorham, Maine, US
- Died: May 8, 1921 (aged 90) Portland, Maine, US
- Party: Republican

James Phinney Baxter (March 23, 1831 – May 8, 1921) was an American politician, businessperson, historian, civic leader, and benefactor of Portland, Maine. He was elected as mayor of Portland for six single-year terms between 1893 and 1905.

His personal library, containing over 100 leather-bound books of maps, portraits, engravings and personal letters, is available for reference at the Portland Public Library.

== Biography ==
James Phinney Baxter was the son of Dr. Elihu Baxter and Sarah Cone Baxter. He was born in Gorham, Maine (in what is now called the Baxter House), on March 23, 1831, but lived in Portland from 1840. He attended Master Jackson's School until 1844, and then Lynn Academy until 1848. He began work in the Boston law offices of Rufus Choate, but ill health forced a return to Portland, where he worked in a dry-goods importing business with William G Davis, pioneering a canning and packing business (Portland Packing Company) that became important to the state's economy.

He used the wealth engendered by his successful business for philanthropic purposes. He was particularly passionate about supporting educational endeavors, and donated a public library (the Baxter Memorial Library) to his birthplace, Gorham, and a library to his adopted city, Portland.

He was mayor of Portland for six years, and the moving spirit behind Baxter Boulevard, a tree-lined road that circles the edge of Back Cove. He was also recognized as an authority on New England history, and among his other interests, he was president of the Maine Historical Society for thirty years and an overseer of Bowdoin College, and connected with many other organizations that furthered the interests of New England history. One of his greatest literary and historical achievements was the editing of twenty of the twenty-four volumes of The Documentary History of Maine.

Baxter also devoted several years to unearthing the details of Capt. Christopher Levett's settlement at Portland in 1623–1624. An English sea captain and explorer, Levett's history and the details of the colony he attempted to found had been largely forgotten when Baxter's scholarship illuminated them. Baxter later published a book about Levett, which incorporated the text of Levett's own earlier work, published in 1628 in London.

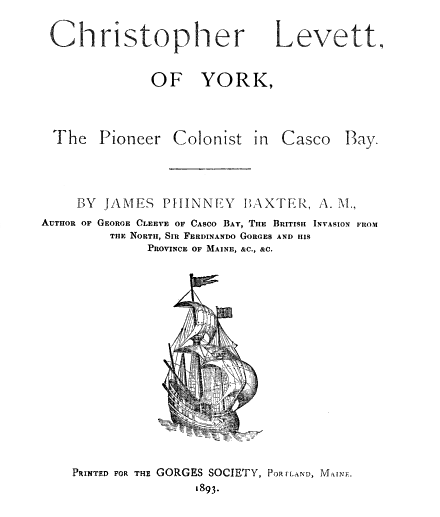
Title page, Christopher Levett, of York: The Pioneer Colonist in Casco Bay, published by The Gorges Society, 1893

In 1887 Baxter was elected a member of the American Antiquarian Society in 1887. He was elected a Fellow of the American Academy of Arts and Sciences in 1915. Baxter was a member of the Maine Society of Colonial Wars.

Baxter was a life-long opponent of vivisection and his Will prohibited any payment from his estate to persons who practiced vivisection.

== Personal ==
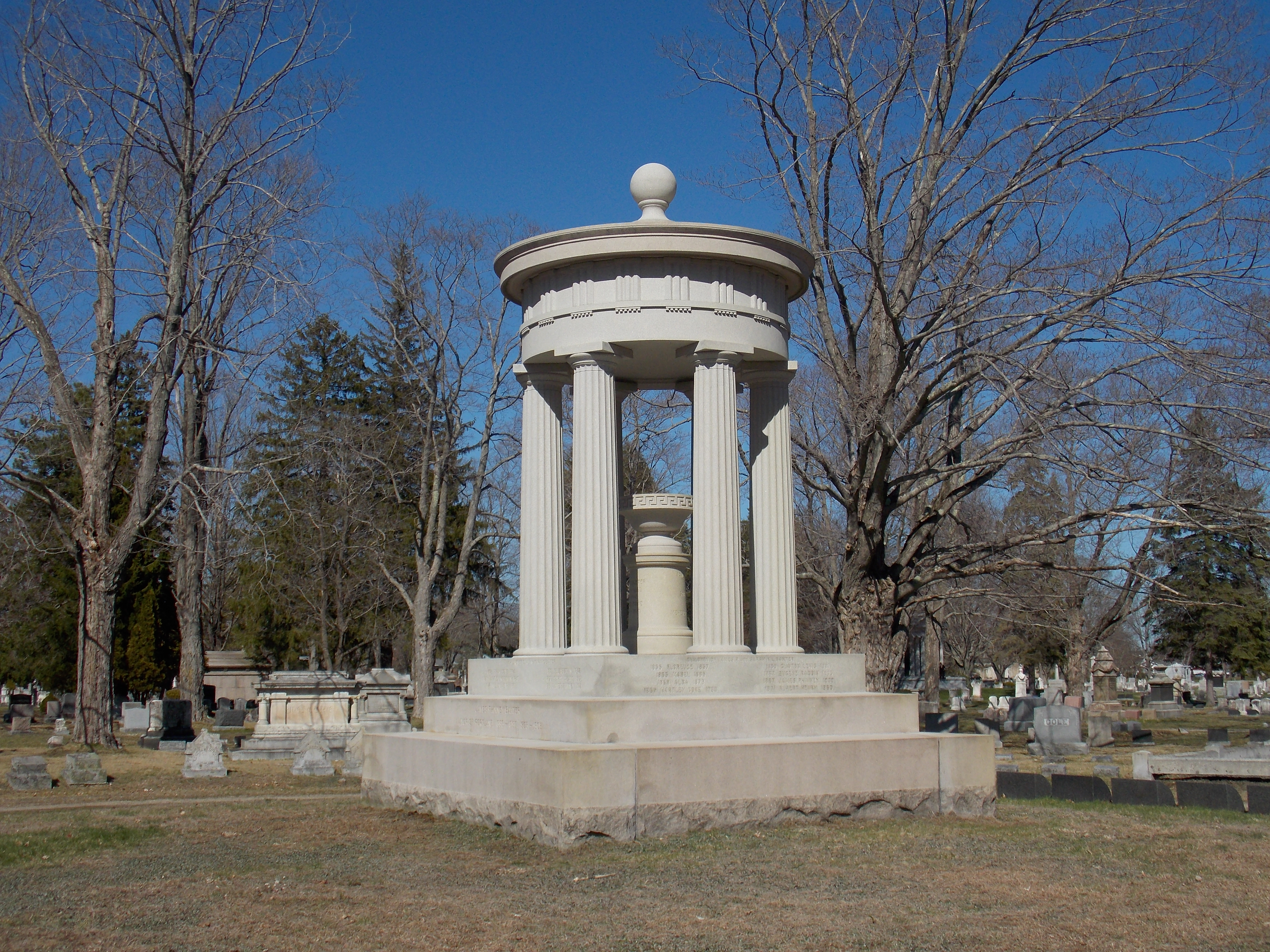
The Baxter Family Monument in Evergreen Cemetery

Baxter died in 1921 at the age of 90, and a Congregationalist pastor officiated at his funeral, although Baxter was also affiliated with the Swedenborg Church. He is buried at Evergreen Cemetery and a large monument to him and his family is located at his gravesite.

One of his sons, Percival Proctor Baxter, wrote a short biography of his father, James Phinney Baxter, Historian in 1921. concluding with "My father had faith in mankind, faith in the future of America, faith in God and faith in the world to come."

== Selected publications ==
- The Trelawney Papers (1884)
- George Cleeve and His Times (1885)
- The British Invasion from the North (1887)
- Sir Ferdinando Georges and his Province of Maine (1890)
- Christopher Levett, of York: The Pioneer Colonist in Casco Bay (1893)
- The Observatory (1893)
- The Pioneers of New France in New England (1894)
- The Voyages of Jacque Cartier (1906)
- The Greatest of Literary Problems: The Authorship of the Shakespeare Works (1917)

== Descendants ==
Descendants of James Phinney Baxter include:

- Percival Proctor Baxter, governor of Maine
- James Phinney Baxter III, president of Williams College
