= Frederick Allen (Maine politician) =

American politician

Frederick N. Allen

Member of the Maine House of Representatives
- In office December 1944 – December 1948

Member of the Maine Senate
- In office December 1948 – December 1952

Personal details
- Born: August 10, 1914 Portland, Maine, U.S.
- Died: November 11, 2001 (aged 87) Gorham, Maine, U.S.
- Education: Boston University
- Occupation: Utilities Regulator

Frederick N. Allen (August 10, 1914 – November 11, 2001) was an American politician from Maine. Allen, a Republican from Portland, served two terms in the Maine House of Representatives (1944-1948) and twice in the Maine Senate (1948-1952).

He served as the national president of the National Association of Regulatory Utility Commissioners, an association of state commissioners of public utilities. He was appointed by Governor Frederick G. Payne to the Maine Public Utilities Commission, which regulates the various utilities of the state of Maine.

Allen managed Burton M. Cross's successful first campaign for governor in 1952. He was also an early supporter of U.S. Senator Margaret Chase Smith. In 2002, he supported Democrat Chellie Pingree for U.S. Senate.

== Personal life ==
Allen was the son of Neal W. Allen, who four times served as Mayor of Portland and Margaret Stevens Allen, who was the daughter of architect John Calvin Stevens. His nephew, Tom Allen, served as Mayor of Portland before serving 6 terms in the U.S. House of Representatives.

He was born in Portland in 1914 and attended Portland Public Schools before graduating from Deering High School. He then attended Boston University.

Allen died in Gorham on November 11, 2001, at the age of 87. He is buried at the Allen Family Cemetery on Allen Road in Sebago, Maine.
