= Mary F. Cahill =

American politician

Member of the Maine House of Representatives from Maine
- In office 1989–1992

Personal details
- Born: 1966 (age 59–60)
- Party: Democrat
- Education: University of Maine in Orono
- Occupation: teacher

Mary F. Cahill (born 1966) is an American politician from Maine. Cahill, a Democrat from Mattawamkeag, served in the Maine House of Representatives from June 1989 to 1992. She was elected in a special election following the May death of her father Thomas A. Cahill. She was the youngest member of the 114th Maine Legislature.

== Personal ==
Cahill graduated from the University of Maine in Orono. Prior to running for office, she taught third grade in Lincoln, Maine. In November 1991, she became engaged to State Senator Gerard Conley Jr. after meeting during the previous session.
