= Philip J. Deering =

American politician

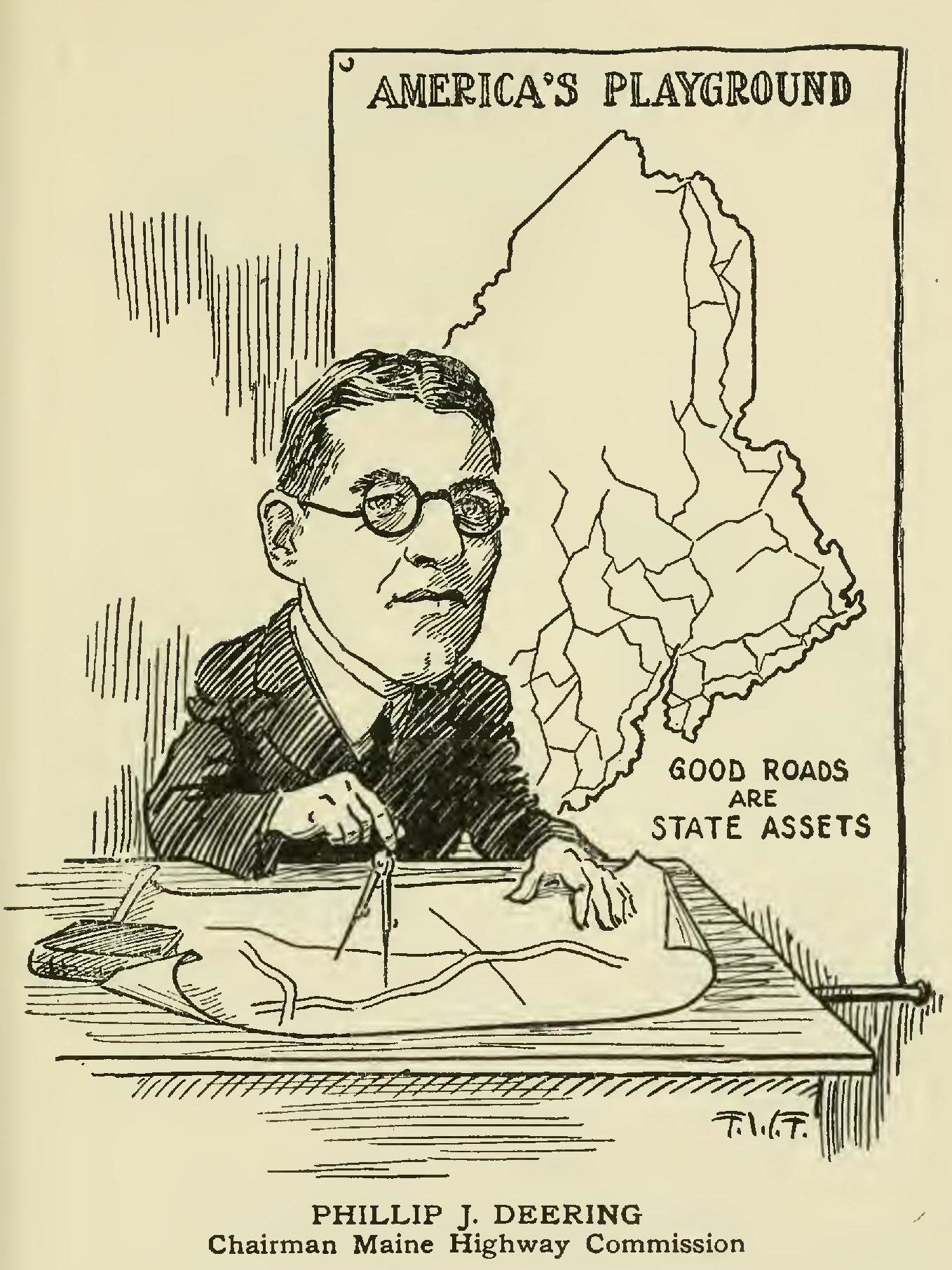

Member of the Maine House of Representatives
- In office December 1910 – December 1912

Member of the Portland, Maine City Council
- In office December 1923 – December 1928

Member of the Portland, Maine City Council
- In office December 1932 – November 1935

Personal details
- Born: 1878
- Died: December 20, 1935 (aged 56–57) Boston, Massachusetts
- Education: Yale University
- Occupation: Businessperson

Philip J. Deering, Sr. (1878 – December 20, 1935) was an American businessperson and politician from Maine. Deering, a Democrat, served in the Maine House of Representatives from one term (1910-1912). He also served four terms as chairman (de facto mayor) of the Portland, Maine City Council in 1924, 1927, 1934 and 1935.

== Biography ==
He was born in 1878 in Maine.

Deering served on the State Highway Commission for seven years, including a year as Chair.

In 1923, Portland voters dramatically altered the city charter, which included eliminated the previously elected mayor position and by cutting the number of City Councilors from 27 common council members and 9 alderman to 5 at-large members. The election was heavily supported by 'native' residents from the previous neighborhoods of Deering, Maine. There was a strong ethnic conflict in the election, with the 'Committee of 100', of which Deering was a member, made up of 99 Protestants and 1 Catholic but no Jewish or African-American residents. Deering was elected subsequently elected in a citywide as the top vote-getter. The new council chose as the first chairman of the City Council, which he held twice during his first term in office. Leaving office in 1928, he was elected again in 1932. During his 5-year term which ended in December 1937, he again served twice as Council chair. He left office less than a month prior to his death.

Deering had an intestinal disease and died in December 1935 at Peter Bent Brigham Hospital in Boston, Massachusetts. Deering's funeral services were held at First Parish Unitarian Church and he is buried at Evergreen Cemetery.
