= Gerard Conley Jr. =

American lawyer and politician

Gerard P. "Gerry" Conley Jr. (born c. 1954) is an American lawyer and politician. He served in the Maine Legislature from 1988 to 1994.

Conley was admitted to the Maine and Massachusetts bars and served as an assistant Maine Attorney General. He was then elected to the Maine House of Representatives as a Democrat in 1986 and 1988 and the Maine Senate in 1990 and 1992.

== Personal ==
Conley was born in Portland, Maine. His father, Gerard Conley Sr., served in the Maine Senate from 1968 to 1984 as well as on the Portland, Maine City Council. The younger Conley graduated from Cheverus High School, earned a bachelor's degree from Saint Anselm College in New Hampshire and a J.D. degree from University of Maine School of Law.

In November 1991, the then-37 year old State Senator became engaged to 26 year old Rep. Mary F. Cahill of Mattawamkeag after meeting during the previous session.
