= Gerard Conley Sr. =

American politician (1930–2018)

Gerard Conley

Member of the Maine Senate from the Portland district
- In office 1968–1984

Mayor of Portland, Maine
- In office 1971–1972
- Preceded by: William MacVane
- Succeeded by: Edward I. Bernstein

Portland City Councilman
- In office 1968–1977

Personal details
- Born: January 3, 1930 Portland, Maine, U.S.
- Died: January 4, 2018 (aged 88)
- Party: Democratic
- Spouse: Anne Duff
- Children: Gerard Conley Jr.
- Education: Portland Junior College

Gerard P. Conley Sr. (January 3, 1930 – January 4, 2018) was an American politician from Maine. Conley, a Democrat, served in the Maine House of Representatives from 1964 to 1968 and in Maine Senate from 1968 to 1984. He spent his final term in the Senate as President of the Maine Senate (1983–1984). His son, Jerry Conley, served in the House from 1986 to 1990 and Senate from 1990 to 1994.

Gerard Conley Sr. served on the Portland, Maine City Council for 9.5 years, including a term as mayor (1971–72).

== Personal ==
Conley was born and raised in Portland, Maine. He graduated from Cheverus High School as well as Portland Junior College (now Southern Maine Community College). Conley served in the United States Army. Conley worked, as a clerk, at the Portland Terminal Company, at the Rigby Yard. He died at Mercy Hospital in Portland, Maine.
