= Wilford G. Chapman =

American politician

Wilford G. Chapman (June 29, 1860 – September 2, 1920) was an American lawyer and politician. He served as mayor of Portland from 1916–1917.

== Early life ==
Chapman graduated from Portland High School in 1879 and Colby College in 1883. He was admitted to the bar in 1885 and was a practicing lawyer until his death. He was married to Tinnie A. and the couple had four children.

== Politics and law ==
Chapman was elected to the Portland Common Council from 1890 to 1895. In 1915, he was the Republican nominee for mayor of Portland, losing to Oakley C. Curtis by nine votes. He ran again the following year and was elected. He was the first Republican to do so in five years. In July 1916, a streetcar strike shut down the city's primary form of mass transportation.

He was also a founding member of the Rotary Club of Portland, Maine.

He was later a judge in the Portland Municipal Court. He died in 1920, a month after being appointed to the city's Board of Health. His funeral was held at the First Parish Church and his buried at Evergreen Cemetery.
