= Edwin C. Berry =

American hotelier

Edwin C. Berry (c. 1854 – 1931), often referred to as E. C. Berry and occasionally as Edward C. Berry, was an American hotelier who was among the most successful African-American hoteliers in the country during his era.

== Early life and career ==
Berry was born at Oberlin, Ohio, in about 1854, and was taken by his parents at the age of two years to Albany, Ohio, where unusual school facilities were offered African-American children. When he was old enough, he was sent to the Albany public schools, and when the Albany Enterprise Academy, a school for African-American children, was erected, he was able to attend it for a short time. His father died in 1870 and young Berry was compelled, at the age of sixteen, to leave school and help provide for his family, in which there were eight children younger than himself.

In his search for work he walked ten miles to Athens, Ohio, and was very happy to secure work in a brick yard at fifty cents a day. In a short time his work improved until he was earning $1.25 a day, the greater part of which he was able to divide with his family. He was never too proud to do any kind of honest labor, and although his work was hard and not inviting, it was the best he could do, and he decided to do it well. During the summers he remained at the brick yard, and in the winters was usually able to find employment in stores or elsewhere as a delivery boy or clerk.

It was during these difficult years that he learned to practice economy. He did not use tobacco or intoxicants; because he could not afford them then. He said he was not able to afford them afterward, either. He also learned to seize opportunities which other boys allowed to slip by them. Whenever a circus came to town the other boys eagerly spent some of their hard earned money to see the show, but young Berry turned the circus to profit. He would rig up a refreshment booth and thus make more money than he would have had he stayed at the brick yard. Whenever there were excursions, that form of extravagance in which so many of our people sink their savings, Berry would always get the privilege of selling refreshments on the train, thus enjoying the excursion and making a profit at the same time.

Speaking of economy he said once that on many occasions he has walked ten miles to his home so that he might have an additional 25 cents for the dear ones there. While he was working at the brick yard, it was his custom to work every day and half the night, thus making the week nine days long. On rainy days when the brick yard was idle he would find some chores to do, or go to the country after cream for the ice cream makers. The first winter after the death of his father he worked at hauling bricks until his hands were cut to the quick by handling the rough surfaces. He was more than rewarded, however, by earning enough to take home four barrels of flour which were all paid for, at $7.80 per barrel.

His first indoor work was in Parkersburg, West Virginia, where he was employed as errand boy in a dry goods store at $10 per month. Of this amount he regularly sent his mother $8 every month. It was in Parkersburg that he first secured work along the line in which he was afterwards to make so great a success. He got work in an ice cream parlor, where he served as a waiter.

Returning to Athens, he secured employment in a restaurant, where he picked up the profession of catering. He soon became so proficient in this profession that he became personally in demand among the customers of his employers. The thought naturally occurred to him that if he could do so well for others he could do still better for himself.

Meanwhile, in 1878, he married his schoolmate, Miss Mattie Madry, and began housekeeping in one room, in which, however, everything was paid for.

The idea of setting up in business for himself would not leave his mind, but as he had no capital and no credit, the way seemed dark before him. His wife came to his aid. By her intercession her parents were persuaded to allow Berry to put the three dollars which he had been paying them weekly for his wife's board into what they called the "business capital". In a few months he was able to start with his elder brother in the restaurant business with a capital of forty dollars. They commenced as "Berry Brothers", but, as the business was not large enough for two, Berry bought his brother out and went along alone.

When Berry's employer learned that his best employee was about to set up as his rival, he was angry, and warned Berry that if he failed and returned looking for employment he would not get it, or even a meal if he were hungry. Berry had the pleasure some time later of materially assisting this man when he himself got into trouble.

The business prospered from the first, and by 1880 Berry was able to buy a lot for $1,300. As soon as the lot was paid for, Berry secured a loan of $2,000 and put up his first building, which is to-day a part of the Hotel Berry. He did a prosperous trade as caterer and confectioner and soon had to hire a young man as assistant.

== The Hotel Berry ==
Berry's success continued until 1893, when he decided to enter the hotel business. At first the outlook was gloomy. In the first place, the merchants of Athens met and decided to boycott any traveling salesman who stopped at the Hotel Berry. In July 1893 occurred the great panic, and on many a night Berry closed up with only one guest on the register. He had incurred a mortgage of $8,000 at seven percent interest. and was compelled to apply at the banks to borrow money to meet his notes. On one occasion both banks in the city refused to let him have money. He was almost in despair. As Berry was going out of the second bank a friend of his, who was standing by, seeing the look of distress on his face, asked him what the trouble was. Berry told him. The friend drew $500, the sum needed, from his private deposit and handed it to Berry, telling him to take it and use it without interest until he could repay it. This is the only time in his career, Berry said, that any person offered him any encouragement beyond empty words.

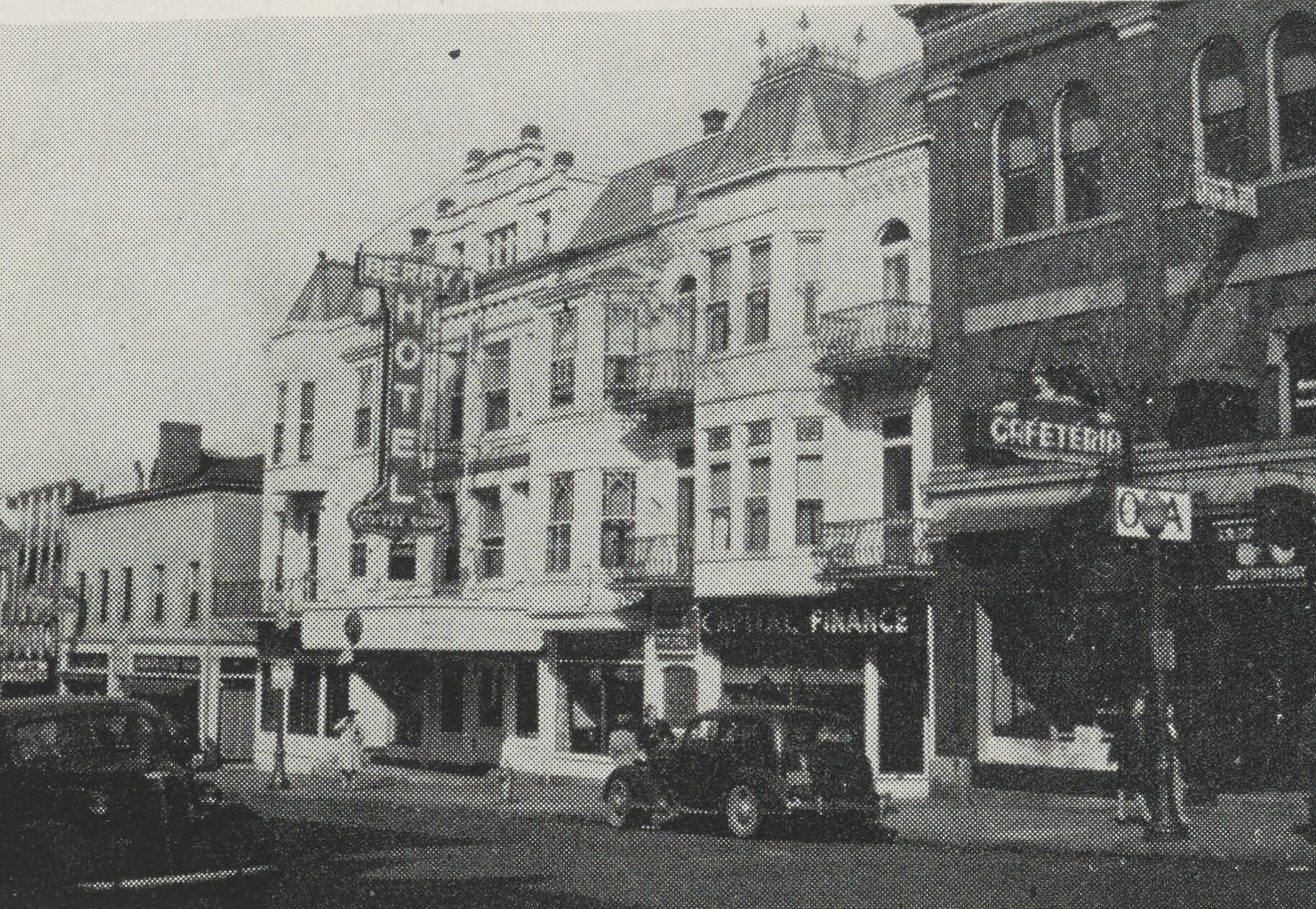
Berry Hotel in Athens Ohio, early 1900s

The panic subsided, and the merchants were unable to drive the salesmen from Berry's hotel. One example will show the methods used by Berry to make his hotel popular. At night, after his guests had fallen asleep, it was his custom to go around and gather up their clothes and take them to his wife, who would add buttons which were lacking, repair rents, and press the garments, after which Berry would replace them in the guests' rooms. Guests who had received such treatment returned again and brought their friends with them.

The Hotel Berry became the leading hotel in Athens. As of 1907, the hotel had fifty rooms, with baths and all modern conveniences, and an elevator. Berry's hotel was the first hotel in the country to have closet hangers, Gideon Bibles in each room, and sewing kits. The hotel was so popular that men came from considerable distances just to spend Sunday there, and was a landmark on the trail of commercial travelers. Berry never refused to serve African-American men at his hotel—indeed, he said he would rather lose his customers than to be guilty of that sort of disloyalty.

Congressman Chas. H Grosvenor spoke highly of Mr. Berry:

He is a man of first-rate character, a devoted and active member of the church, taking a leading part in Sunday School work, and a friend of his own race, to more than one of whom he has given a quiet lift of which the public has never known.
