= Frederic E. Boothby =

American politician (1845–1923)

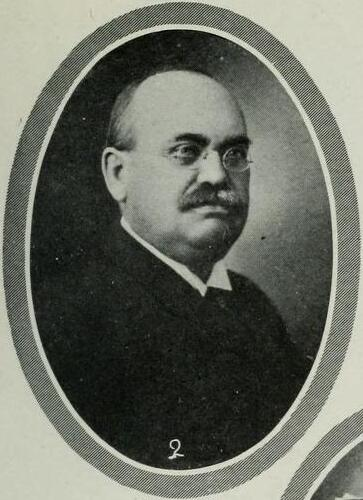
- Boothby in a 1914 publication
- Born: Frederic Eleazer Boothby; December 3, 1845; Norway, Maine, U.S.
- Died: January 7, 1923 (aged 77); Waterville, Maine, U.S.
- Resting place: Pine Grove Cemetery; Waterville, Maine, U.S.
- Occupations: Politician; railroad manager
- Political party: Republican
- Spouse: Adelaide Eudora Smith (m. 1871; died 1921)

Frederic Eleazer Boothby (December 3, 1845 – January 7, 1923) was an American railroad manager and politician.

== Early life ==
Frederic Eleazer Boothby was born on December 3, 1845, in Norway, Maine, to Sophia Packard (née Brett) and Levi Thompson Boothby. At a young age, he moved to South Paris, Maine. He attended Oxford Normal Institute in South Paris. He attended grammar and high schools in Waterville and Waterville Academy (later Coburn Classical Institute).

== Career ==
From 1861 to 1864, Boothby was assistant postmaster of Waterville under Charles R. McFadden. On May 1, 1864, he became master of transportation of the Maine Central Railroad Company. A few months later he was appointed general ticket agent. In 1871, after the railroad consolidated with the Central and Portland & Kennebec railroads, he took charge of the freight accounting department, headquartered in Augusta, and became paymaster. In 1875, after offices moved to Portland, he was appointed general passenger and ticket agent of the Maine Central Railroad. He was also general passenger agent for Phillips & Rangeley Lake Railroad and the Portland, Mt. Desert & Machias Steamboat Company. He was director of the Union Safe Deposit & Trust Company in Portland and the North East Summer Resort Association. He was treasurer and trustee of Maine Eye and Ear Infirmary in Portland. He was president of Forest City Loan & Building Association.

Boothby was member of the staffs of Governors Bodwell and Marble. Governor Edwin C. Burleigh appointed him as commissary general of his staff. He was president of the Portland Board of Trade for five terms from 1897 to 1901. He later served as director of Portland Chamber of Commerce. He was elected mayor in 1901. He was re-elected in 1902 and 1903. In 1904, he was a delegate at-large to the Republican National Convention in Chicago which chose Theodore Roosevelt as the party's nominee. In 1916, Boothby was elected mayor of Waterville and served in that position for one year. After his brother W. A. R.'s death, he became director of the Boothby and Bartlett Company of Waterville.

Boothby was president of the American Association of the General Passenger and Ticket Agents in 1905. He was treasurer of the Maine Historical Society and treasurer of the Portland Prison Commission. He was treasurer of the Maine branch of the American Red Cross. He was treasurer of the Portland Civic Club's Bath Committee. He was director of the Maine Society of the Prevention Cruelty to Animals. He was president of the Maine branch of the Sons of the American Revolution. He was a trustee of the Maine Home for Friendless Boys and the Coburn Classical Institute. He was director of the Rand Avery Company of Boston. He was vice president of the Western Maine Musical Association for 23 years. He helped arrange the first Maine Musical Festival.

== Personal life ==
Boothby married Adelaide Eudora Smith, daughter of Vesta Thayer and Charles H. Smith, on October 25, 1871. She died in 1921. They traveled extensively, including Mexico and each state in the United States (except Oklahoma). He was Episcopalian and was warden of St. Stephen's Church. He lived in Falmouth Hotel while in Portland.

Boothby died on January 7, 1923, at his home on College Avenue in Waterville. He was buried in Pine Grove Cemetery in Waterville.

== Legacy ==
Boothby Square in Portland was named after him.
