= Mayor of Portland, Maine =

Head of the Portland, Maine municipal government

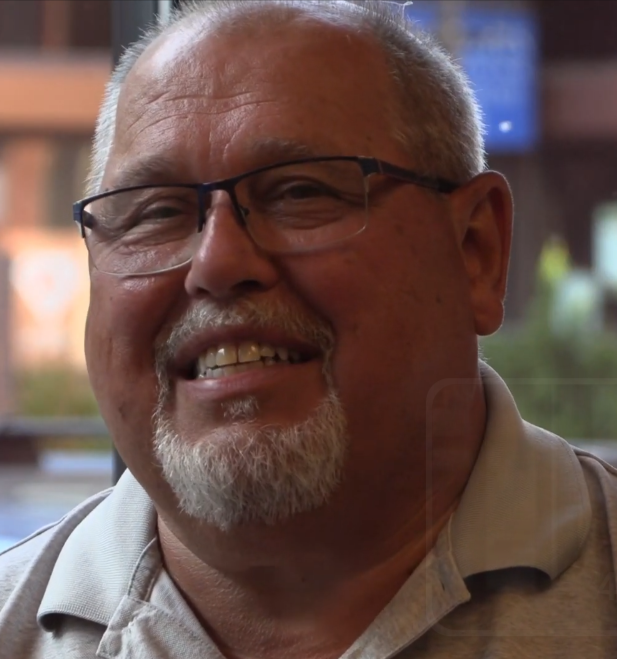
- Incumbent; Mark Dion since December 4, 2023
- Term length: 4 years
- Inaugural holder: Andrew L. Emerson
- Formation: 1832
- Salary: $65,400 (2011)
- Website: https://portlandmaine.gov/Mayor

The mayor of Portland, Maine is the official head of the city of Portland, Maine, United States, as stipulated in the Charter of the City of Portland. This article is a list of past (and present) mayors of Portland.

== History of the office ==
Before 1923, the city's leader was known as the mayor. From 1923 to 1969, the position was named "Chairman of the City Council." In 1969, the "Mayor" title was reinstated, but the office continued to be held by the leader of the city council, chosen by a vote of its members.

In 2011, the city returned to the practice of popularly electing a mayor for the first time since 1923. Subsequent elections were held in 2015, 2019 and 2023.

== List of mayors ==
This is a list of mayors of Portland, Maine. This information is obtained from the website of the city council.

#	Mayor	Party	Term	Notes
1	Andrew L. Emerson		1832	
2	Jonathan Dow		1832	
3	John Anderson	Democrat	1833	National Republican Party candidate
4	Levi Cutter		1834–1840	
5	James C. Churchill		1841	
6	John Anderson	Democrat	1842	
7	Eliphalet Greeley	Whig	1843–1848	
8	James B. Cahoon	Whig	1849–1850	
9	Neal Dow	Whig	1851–1852	Maine law
10	Albion K. Parris	Democrat	1852–1853	Preiviously U.S. senator and governor of Maine
11	James B. Calhoon	Democrat	1853–1854	
12	Neal Dow	Republican	1855–1856	Later served in the Maine House
13	James T. McCobb		1856	
14	William Willis	Republican	1857	Previously served in the Maine Senate
15	Jedediah Jewett		1858–1859	
16	Joseph Howard		1860	Previously a justice of the Maine Supreme Judicial Court 1848–1855 and future Democratic nominee for governor in 1865
17	William W. Thomas		1861–1862	
18	Jacob McLellan		1863–65	
19	Augustus E. Stevens		1866–1867	
20	Jacob McLellan		1868	
21	William Lebaron Putnam	Democrat	1869–1870	Judge of the United States Court of Appeals for the First Circuit 1892–1917
22	Benjamin Kingsbury Jr.		1870–1872	
23	George P. Wescott		1873–1874	
24	Roswell M. Richardson		1875	
25	Francis Fessenden	Republican	1876	Major general in the 25th and 30th Maine Volunteer Infantry Regiments during the Civil War
26	Moses M. Butler		1877–1878	
27	George Walker		1879	
28	William Senter		1880–1881	
29	Charles F. Libby		1882	
31	John W. Deering	Democrat	1883	Formerly a Republican. Commissioner of the Port of Portland under President Grover Cleveland.
32	Marquis F. King		1884	
33	John W. Deering	Democrat	1885	Formerly a Republican. Commissioner of the Port of Portland under President Grover Cleveland.
34	Charles J. Chapman		1886–1888	
35	Holman S. Melcher	Republican	1889–1890	Captain in the 20th Maine Volunteer Infantry Regiment during the Civil War
36	George W. True		1891	
37	Darius H. Ingraham		1892	
38	James Phinney Baxter	Republican	1893–1896	
39	Charles H. Randall		1897–1898	
40	Frank W. Robinson		1899–1900	Previously Cumberland County district attorney and judge of the Portland Municipal Court 1893–1899
41	Frederic E. Boothby	Republican	1901–1903	
42	James Phinney Baxter	Republican	1904–1905	
43	Nathan Clifford	Democrat	1906–1907	
44	Adam P. Leighton	Republican	1908–1909	
45	Charles A. Strout	Republican	1910	
46	Oakley C. Curtis	Democrat	1911–1914	Governor of Maine 1915–1917
47	William Moulton Ingraham	Democrat	1915	
48	Wilford G. Chapman	Republican	1916–1917	
49	Charles B. Clarke	Republican	1918–1921	
50	Carroll S. Chaplin	Republican	1922–1923	
51	Philip J. Deering	Democrat	1924	
52	Neal W. Allen		1925–1926	
53	Philip J. Deering	Democrat	1927	
54	Lester F. Wallace		1928–1929	
55	Ralph D. Brooks		1930	
56	Arthur W. Jordan		1931	
57	Ralph D. Brooks		1932	
58	Arthur E. Craig		1933	
59	Philip J. Deering	Democrat	1934–1935	
60	Edward C. Berry		1936	
61	Adam P. Leighton, Jr.		1937	
62	Edward C. Berry		1938	
63	Arthur E. Craig		1939	
64	Harry E. Martin		1940	
65	Edward C. Berry		1941	
66	Adam P. Leighton Jr.		1942	
67	Herman B. Libby		1943	
68	George A. Harrison		1944	
69	Harry C. Libby		1945	
70	Helen C. Frost		1946	
71	Herman B. Libby		1947	
72	Robert L. Getchell		1948–1949	
73	Edward T. Colley		1950	
74	Helen C. Frost		1952	
75	H. Merrill Luthe		1953	
76	Edward T. Colley		1954	
77	Ben B. Wilson		1955	
78	H. Merrill Luthe		1956	
79	Carleton G. Lane		1957	
80	Perley J. Lessard		1958	
81	Sumner S. Clark		1959	
82	Mitchell Cope		1960	
83	Harold E. Frank		1961	
84	Daniel B. Felix		1962	
85	Ralph Amerigan		1963	
86	J. Weston Walch		1964–1965	
87	Charles W. Allen		1966	
88	Harold G. Loring		1967	
89	Donald Slipp		1969–1970	
90	William L. MacVane	Democrat	1970–1971	
91	Gerard Conley Sr.	Democrat	1971–1972	
92	Edward I. Bernstein	Republican	1973	
93	William B. Troubh	Democrat	1974–1975	
94	Harold G. Loring		1975–1976	
95	Matthew I. Barron		1976–1978	
96	Bruce Taliento		1978	
97	Edward I. Bernstein	Republican	1978–1979	
98	Llewellyn Smith		1979–1980	
99	John O'Leary	Democrat	1980–1981	
100	Pamela P. Plumb		1981–1982	
101	Linda Abromson	Democrat	1982–1983	
102	William B. Troubh	Democrat	1983–1984	
103	David H. Brenerman	Democrat	1984–1985	
104	Joseph D. Casale	Democrat	1985–1986	
105	Philip J. Dawson		1986–1987	
106	Ronald J. Dorler		1987–1988	
107	Cheryl A. Leeman	Republican	1988–1989	
108	Esther Clenott	Democrat	1989–1990	
109	Peter O'Donnell	Democrat	1990–1991	
110	Thomas H. Allen	Democrat	1991–1992	
111	Charles Harlow	Democrat	1992–1993	
112	Anne B. Pringle	Democrat	1993–1994	
113	Richard W. "Dick" Paulson Jr.	Democrat	1994–1995	
114	Philip "Jack" Dawson	Democrat	1995–1996	
115	John F. McDonough	Democrat	1996–1997	
116	George N. Campbell		1997–1998	
117	Thomas V. Kane	Democrat	1998–1999	
118	Nicholas "Nick" Mavodones Jr.	Democrat	1999–2000	
119	Cheryl A. Leeman	Republican	2000–2001	
120	Karen Geraghty	Democrat	2001–2002	
121	James F. "Jim" Cloutier	Democrat	2002–2003	
122	Nathan Smith	Democrat	2003–2004	
123	Jill Duson	Democrat	2004–2005	First African-American mayor
124	James I. Cohen	Democrat	2005–2006	
125	Nicholas "Nick" Mavodones Jr.	Democrat	2006–2007	
126	Edward Suslovic	Democrat	2007–2008	
127	Jill Duson	Democrat	2008–2010	
128	Nicholas "Nick" Mavodones Jr.	Democrat	2010–2011	

=== Elected mayors (since 2011) ===
No.	Portrait	Name	Party	Term	Election	Notes
87		Michael F. Brennan	Democrat	2011 – 2015	2011	First popularly elected mayor of Portland since 1923. Previously served in the Maine House of Representatives 1992–2000 and in the Maine Senate 2002–2006.
88		Ethan Strimling	Democrat	2015 – 2019	2015	
89		Kate Snyder	Democrat	2019 – 2023	2019	
90		Mark Dion	Democrat	2023 – Incumbent	2023	

== See also ==
- Old City Hall (Portland, Maine)
- Timeline of Portland, Maine
