= List of Portland, Maine schools =

This is a list of schools in the city of Portland, Maine. (Outdated)

== Primary schools ==
- Breakwater School (private)
- Fred P. Hall Elementary School (public)
- East End Community School (public)
- Longfellow School (public)
- Harrison Lyseth Elementary School (public)
- Levey Day School (private - Jewish)
- Ocean Avenue Elementary School (public)
- Peaks Island Elementary School (public)
- Presumpscot Elementary School (public)
- Howard C. Reiche School (public)
- Gerald E. Talbot Community School (public)
- St. Brigid School (private – Catholic)

== Middle/High schools ==
- Cheverus High School (private - Jesuit)
- Waynflete School (private)
- Helen King Middle School (public)
- Lincoln Middle School (public)
- Lyman Moore Middle School (public)
- Portland High School (public)
- Deering High School (public)
- Baxter Academy for Technology and Science (charter)
- Casco Bay High School (public)

== Colleges and universities ==
- Maine College of Art & Design
- University of Maine School of Law
- University of New England (Westbrook College Campus)
- University of Southern Maine
