= PHS =

PHS may refer to:

== Organizations ==
- Partido Humanista da Solidariedade (Humanist Party of Solidarity), a Brazilian political party
- Peninsula Humane Society, for animal welfare in San Mateo County, California, US
- Pennsylvania Horticultural Society
- Portuguese Hammerskins, the Portuguese branch of Hammerskins
- Printing Historical Society, British learned society concerned with the history of printing

== Schools ==
- Palatine High School, Palatine, Illinois, United States
- Penncrest High School, Media, Pennsylvania, United States
- Perry High School (Georgia), United States
- Piner High School, Santa Rosa, California, United States
- Portland High School (disambiguation)
- Portola High School, Irvine, California, United States
- Princeton High School (New Jersey), United States

== Other uses ==
- Personal Handy-phone System, an Asian mobile network system
- Phitsanulok Airport, Thailand, IATA code
- Politihøyskolen, the Norwegian Police University College
- Public Health Scotland
- Public Health Service, US
