= Wilbur R. Ingalls Jr. =

American architect

- Born: February 21, 1923; Portland, Maine, US
- Died: September 23, 1997 (aged 74); Portland, Maine, US
- Education: Syracuse University (B.Arch.)
- Occupation: Architect
- Awards: New York Society of Architects award for Excellence in Building Construction

Wilbur R. Ingalls Jr., (February 21, 1923 − September 23, 1997) was an American architect from the state of Maine. Ingalls focused mainly on schools, but also designed other types of public buildings such as churches and banks.

== Early life ==
Wilbur R. Ingalls Jr. was the son of Laura Lewis Ingalls and Wilbur R. Ingalls Sr. He was born in Portland, Maine, and attended Portland Public Schools, graduating from Deering High School in 1942. Ingalls was a member of the United States Army and served in Europe during World War II. During his time in the Army, Ingalls attended the Arizona State Teachers College at Tempe as an aviation cadet. After the war, he returned to Portland, and attended the Portland Junior College. In 1952 Ingalls graduated from the School of Architecture at Syracuse University.

== Career ==
Shortly after graduating from Syracuse, Ingalls began his career as an architect at the firm of Alonzo J. Harriman, in Auburn, Maine. In 1956, he worked for Engineering Services of Portland, and in 1957 he opened his own private architecture firm, which he continued until retiring in 1995.

In a 1989 letter to The Portland Press Herald, Ingalls wrote: "It is a matter of architectural philosophy to use a few quality exterior materials in a simple way and let the interiors unfold as a series of surprises."

Ingalls designed more than sixty schools throughout Maine. He also designed several churches and banks. According to Ingalls' wife, his favorite designs were the Howard C. Reiche Community School and the Portland Arts & Technology High School.

== Works ==
Schools

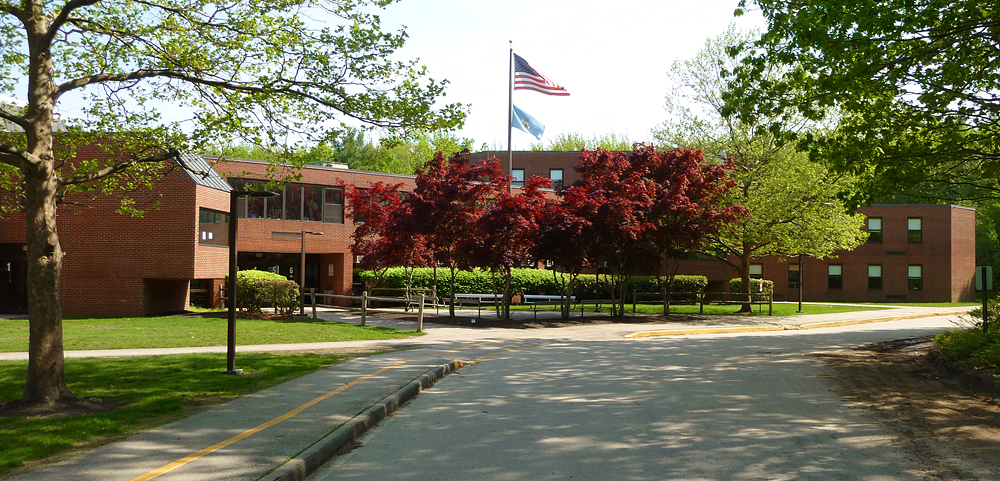
Wells High School.

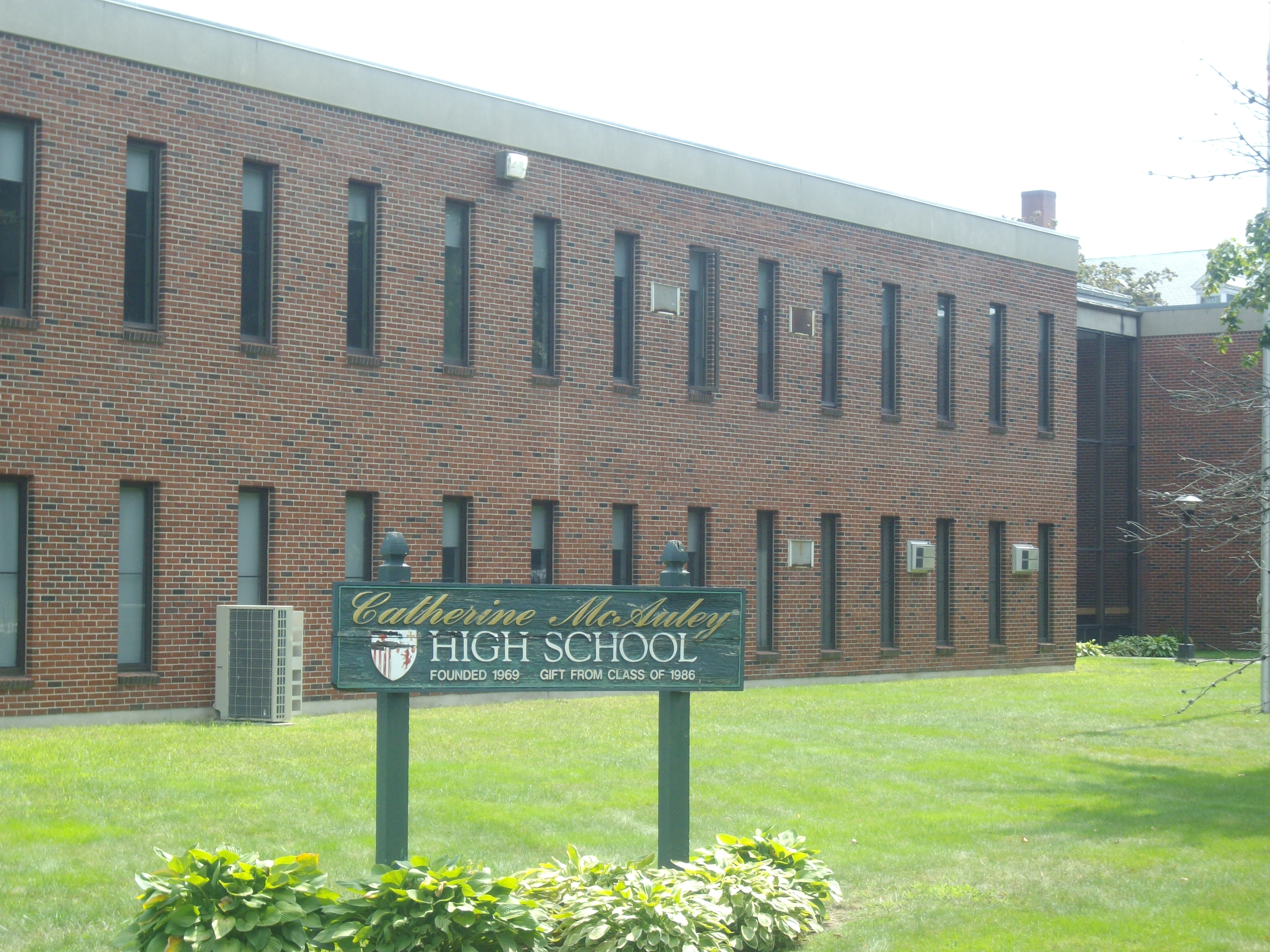
Catherine McAuley High School.

Name	Location	Year built
Blewett Science Center at Westbrook College	Portland, Maine	
Bonny Eagle Middle School	Buxton, Maine	
Canal School	Westbrook, Maine	
Catherine McAuley High School	Portland, Maine	1969
Field House at Hyde School	Bath, Maine	
Howard C. Reiche Community School	Portland, Maine	
MacDougall-Ginn Hall at Westbrook College	Portland, Maine	
The first Noble High School (now Noble Middle School)	North Berwick, Maine	1969
Portland Arts and Technology High School	Portland, Maine	
Memorial Junior High School (now Memorial Middle School)	South Portland, Maine	1967
The fourth Wells High School	Wells, Maine	1977

Churches

Name	Location	Year built
Father Hayes Center at St. Joseph's Catholic Church	Portland, Maine	1970
Grace Episcopal Church	Bath, Maine	
Holy Martyrs Church	Falmouth, Maine	
St. Andrew's Roman Catholic Church	Augusta, Maine	
Renovation and alterations to Trinity Episcopal Church	Portland, Maine	
Westbrook-Warren Congregational Church	Westbrook, Maine	1977

Municipal buildings

Name	Location	Year built
Freeport Public Safety Building	Freeport, Maine	1993
Freeport Public Works Building	Freeport, Maine	1993
Memorial Branch of the South Portland Public Library	South Portland, Maine	1976

Commercial buildings

Name	Location	Year built
Commercial Street branch of KeyBank	Portland, Maine	
