= Quinton Porter =

American gridiron football player (born 1982)

No. 5, 12
- Position: Quarterback

Personal information
- Born: December 28, 1982 (age 43); Portland, Maine, U.S.
- Listed height: 6 ft 5 in (1.96 m)
- Listed weight: 228 lb (103 kg)

Career information
- High school: Portland
- College: Boston College
- NFL draft: 2006: undrafted

Career history
- 2006: Houston Texans
- 2007: Cologne Centurions
- 2007: Carolina Panthers*
- 2008–2012: Hamilton Tiger-Cats
- 2013: Montreal Alouettes*
- * Offseason or practice squad member only
- Stats at CFL.ca (archive)

Quinton George Porter (born December 28, 1982) is an American former professional football quarterback. He played college football at Boston College, and was signed by the Houston Texans of the National Football League (NFL) as an undrafted free agent in 2006. He was on the Texans' active roster during the 2006 season, and was on the Carolina Panthers' practice squad in 2007. He was also a starting quarterback with the Hamilton Tiger-Cats of the Canadian Football League (CFL), where he spent 5 years.

== Early life ==
Porter grew up in Portland, Maine. He was the youngest of the five children of Georgia and Michael Porter. He was a football star at King Middle School, then Portland High School. At Portland High, Porter also played basketball and was a member of the National Honor Society.

In 2000, his senior year in high school, he won separate honors as Maine's top high school athlete in awards sponsored by USA Today and Gatorade. He led Portland High to 10–1 record in football while throwing for 1,600 yards and 18 touchdowns. He gained all-state and all-conference honors.

== College career ==
Porter accepted a scholarship from Boston College and saw action as a backup in 2001 and 2002. He was the starting quarterback his junior year (2003) for all but the last three games after a hand injury.

He was redshirted in 2004, making 2005 his senior year.

Porter was named starting quarterback at the start of the 2005 season. He started seven games and was named Atlantic Coast Conference player of the week for his performance in BC's 28–17 win over Virginia. Leading up to the October 27 game against Virginia Tech, the Eagles under Porter were ranked 13th in the country.

However, after a 30–10 loss to 3rd ranked Virginia Tech (led by quarterback Marcus Vick, brother of Michael Vick), and a loss to North Carolina, a quarterback controversy erupted as BC coach Tom O'Brien announced that he would start Porter's backup, Matt Ryan, in the upcoming game against North Carolina State University. Ryan began starting, and led the Eagles to a victory over Boise State in the MPC Computers Bowl.

In February 2003 Porter experienced a personal tragedy when his father died unexpectedly of a heart attack. Michael Porter, a huge supporter of his son, had attended every Boston College game, home and away.

== Professional career ==
=== Houston Texans ===
Porter signed with the Houston Texans as an undrafted free agent May 8, 2006. He was soon moved to the practice squad where he stayed until early December. He was then signed to the active roster for the remainder of his rookie season. He was the team's third-string quarterback for much of the 2006 season. He saw no regular season playing time. The Texans sent him to play for the Cologne Centurions of NFL Europe in the spring of 2007. He was released by the Texans August 26, 2007.

=== Carolina Panthers ===
After a Jake Delhomme injury that left David Carr and Matt Moore as the only healthy quarterbacks on the Panthers' roster. Porter was signed to Carolina's practice squad on September 26, 2007.

=== Hamilton Tiger Cats ===
On May 14, 2008, the Hamilton Tiger Cats announced the signing of Porter. He beat out Timmy Chang in the preseason to become the Ti-Cats third-string quarterback. He moved up to the second string on July 25 due to an injury to Casey Printers. He was moved up to the second string again for the September 12 game by new head coach Marcel Bellefeuille. Porter made his first start on September 27, 2008. Porter was sacked ten times by the BC Lions defense and went 14-of-27 for 144 yards with two interceptions in a 40–10 loss. His performance in his second start, 27-of-32 passing for 429 yards and five touchdowns including running himself for 42 yards on six carries, earned him the CFL's Offensive Player of the Week honours as well as the team's unexpected victory over the East's first place team, the Montreal Alouettes, and solidified his position as the number one quarterback on the Ti-Cats roster until the emergence of Kevin Glenn. For the 2010 and 2011 seasons, Porter was second string, backing up Glenn, in addition to coming in for short yardage situations. In 2011, Porter led the CFL in rushing touchdowns with nine. On January 15, 2013, the Tiger-Cats released Porter as per his request.

=== Montreal Alouettes ===
On January 21, 2013, Porter signed a 3-year deal with the Montreal Alouettes of the Canadian Football League. In the 2013 preseason, Porter completed 10 of 26 passing attempts for 191 yards with 2 touchdowns and 1 interception. He was released on June 21, 2013.

== Personal life ==
In 2019, Porter joined Pico – Get Personal as vice president for North America. He left the company in January 2022.
