= Moses M. Butler =

American lawyer & politician (1824-1879)

Moses M. Butler (1824-October 9, 1879) was an American lawyer and politician who served as mayor of Portland, Maine from 1877-1879.

Butler graduated from Bowdoin College in 1845 at the head of his class. He had a legal partnership with Judge Woodbury Davis.

He became ill while in the Maine Superior Court court room and soon died. His funeral service was held at the First Parish Church on October 24, 1879. At the time of his death, he was president of the Maine Unitarian Association. He was survived by his wife and one son.

The Butler School in Portland's West End opened in 1879 and is named in his honor.
