= William Norbert =

American lawyer and politician

Member of the Maine House of Representatives from the 34th district
- In office December 2, 1998 – December 1, 2004
- Preceded by: Thomas Gieringer
- Succeeded by: L. Earl Bierman

Personal details
- Born: November 28, 1967 (age 58)
- Party: Democratic
- Education: Brown University (AB) University of Maine (JD)

William S. Norbert (born November 28, 1967) is an American lawyer and politician from Maine. Norbert, a Democrat, served in the Maine House of Representatives from 1998 to 2004, including two terms in a leadership position. During the 2000-2002 term, Norbert served as Majority Whip. From 2002 to 2004, Norbert served as Deputy Majority Leader.

== Education ==
He graduated from Portland High School in Maine in 1986.

He graduated from Brown University with a Bachelor's degree in political science in 1990 and from the University of Maine School of Law with a Juris Doctor in 1995.

== Legal career ==
From 1995 to 1998 he served as a law clerk to Maine Supreme Court Justice Robert Clifford and later served as a law clerk to Magistrate Judge Eugene Beaulieu of the Maine District Court. From 2004 to 2006 he was staff attorney for the Disability Rights Center of Maine.

== Political career ==
He served in the Maine House of Representatives representing the 34th District from 1998 to 2004 as a Democrat. While in this position he served as Chairman of the House Judiciary Committee, Majority Whip, and Deputy Majority Leader.

From 2005 to 2006 he served as an Assistant Attorney General of Maine for the Child Support Enforcement Division.

Since 2006 he has served as a Government Affairs and Communications Manager for the Finance Authority of Maine.
