= Earle G. Shettleworth Jr. =

American historian

Earle G. Shettleworth Jr. (born August 17, 1948) is a Maine historian. In 2004, Shettleworth was appointed the sixth State Historian by Governor John Baldacci and reappointed four years later.

== Personal ==
He was born to Earle G. Shettleworth Sr. and Esther Knudsen Shettleworth. He attended Portland, Maine Public Schools and graduated from Deering High School in 1966. Shettleworth was 11 years old when he had his first meeting with Percival Proctor Baxter, who served as 53rd Governor of Maine from 1921 to 1925. He became interested in historic preservation in 1961 when, at the age of 13, Portland's Union Station was destroyed in favor of a strip mall. In 1970, Shettleworth earned a B.A. in Art History from Colby College. He also earned an M.A. in Architectural History from Boston University in 1979, and an honorary degree from Bowdoin College in 2008.

== Career ==
Shettleworth served as president of the Maine Historical Society from 1977 to 1979 as well as various other appointed positions in state historical preservation.
