= King Middle School =

King Middle School may refer to any of the following middle schools:

- Thomas Starr King Middle School of Los Angeles, California
- King Middle School (Portland, Maine) of Portland, Maine
- King Middle School (Milton, Florida) of Milton, Florida
- King Middle School (Portland, Oregon) of Portland, Oregon
- King Middle School (Atlanta) of Atlanta, Georgia
- Kenneth D. King Middle School (Harrodsburg, Kentucky) of Harrodsburg, Kentucky
- Martin Luther King Middle School (Berkeley), a public school in Berkeley, California
