= Ruski's Tavern =

Bar in Portland, Maine, U.S.

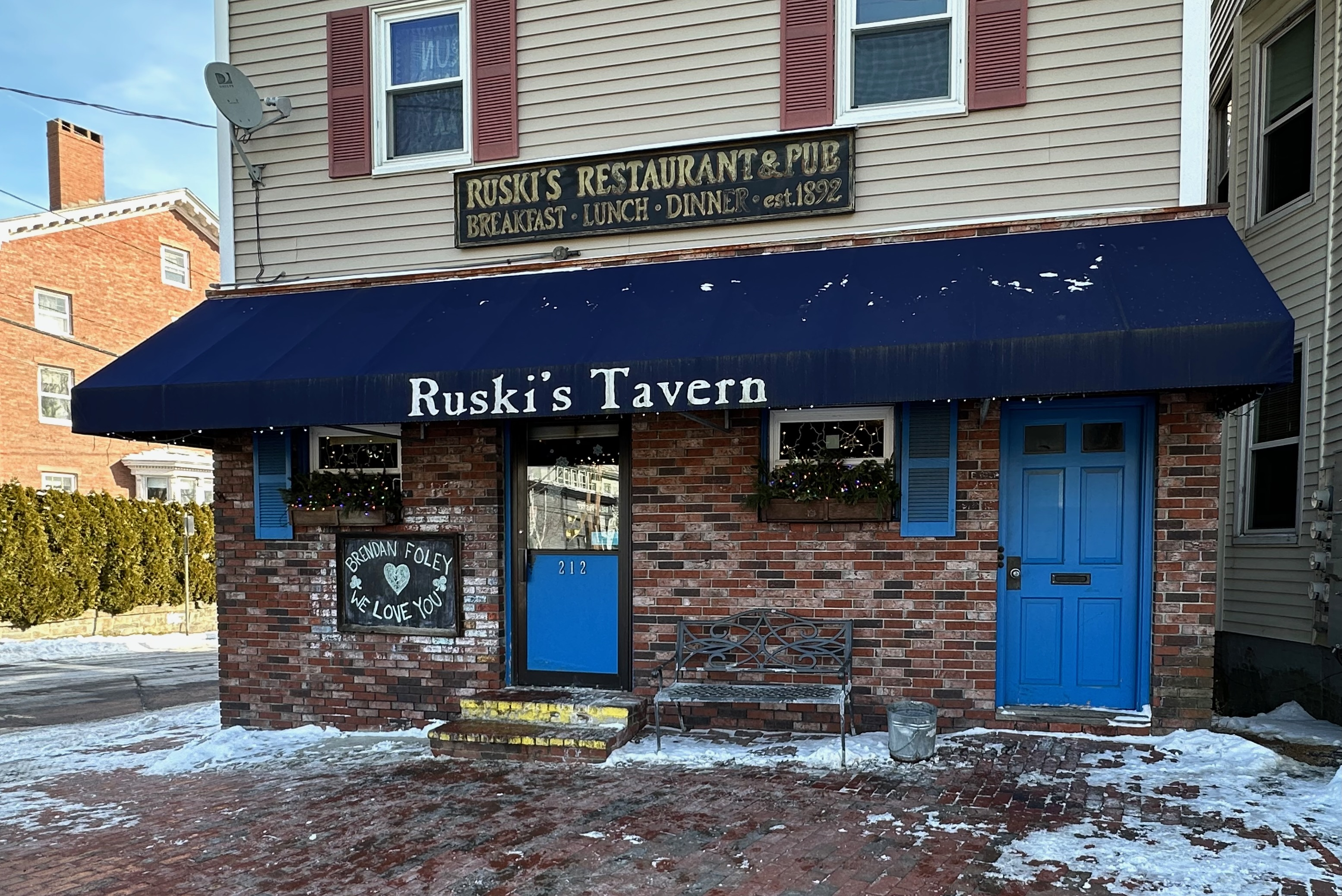
- The bar in 2024
- Interactive map of Ruski's Tavern

Restaurant information
- Established: 1981 (45 years ago)
- Owners: Josh Whaley; Monica Whaley
- Previous owners: Steve Harris; Rose Harris
- Location: 212 Danforth Street, Portland, Cumberland County, Maine, 04102, United States
- Coordinates: 43.64808°N 70.26418°W

Ruski's Tavern (sometimes sylized as Rūski's Tavern) is a dive bar located at 212 Danforth Street in the West End of Portland, Maine, United States. It is one of the city's few remaining neighborhood bars, and (having been established under its current name in 1981) one of its oldest. As of 2023, it is owned by Josh and Monica Whaley, who purchased it in 2005.

It is one of Portland's Class XI-licensed restaurants: ones that may not generate more than $50,000 in food sales and may serve only alcohol for part of the day.

== History ==
The property was built, originally as a home, in the 1860s. Around forty years later, it became a beer parlor, owned by Jesse McLinchy, a wealthy Irishman.

Between 1892 and around 1920, the building was also the home of Fickett and Thompson Apothecary.

In the 1920s, it became Hynes Dry Goods, while in the early 1930s it was, among other businesses, Spiller's Bakery.

In 1935, it became Elsmac Cafe, then, between 1937 and 1944, Slane's Cafe.

After World War II, it was purchased by Mary Mancini, during which time it became the White Eagle Cafe and the Red Eye. Between 1974 and 1980, the tavern was named Beacon II, then the Green & Gold.

In 1981, the bar was renamed for its previous owner Robert Russo, who was nicknamed Ruski by his successor, Frank Navarro. He used the phrase brewskis at Ruski's.

Steve and Rose Harris purchased the tavern in November 1985. (Rose is the namesake of Rosie's Restaurant & Pub at 330 Fore Street.) Steve died in 2009, aged 63, four years after he and his wife sold the pub to Josh and Monica Whaley, the current owners.

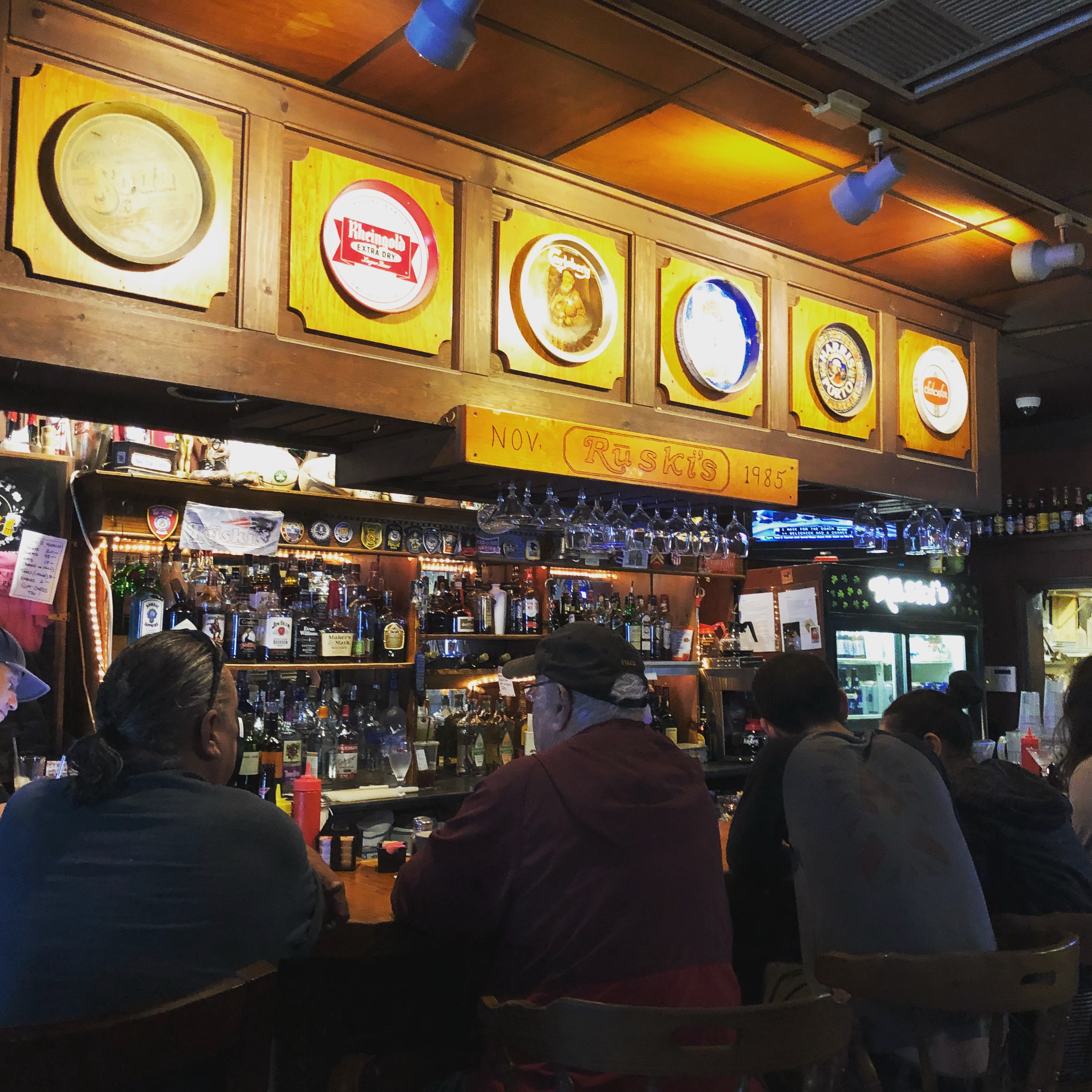
The bar's interior (2018)
