= Portland High School =

Several schools in the U.S. are named Portland High School including:

- Gregory-Portland High School — Portland, Texas
- Portland Adventist Academy — Portland, Oregon
- Portland High School — Portland, Connecticut
- Portland Arts and Technology High School — Portland, Maine
- Portland Christian School — Louisville, Kentucky
- Portland High School, which became Lincoln High School (Portland, Oregon) in 1909
- Portland Christian Schools — Portland, Oregon
- Portland High School — Portland, Indiana
- Portland High School (Maine) — Portland, Maine
- Portland High School (Michigan) — Portland, Michigan
- Portland High School (Tennessee) — Portland, Tennessee
- South Portland High School — South Portland, Maine
