= Andrews Square =

Square in Portland, Maine

Harold T. Andrews Square
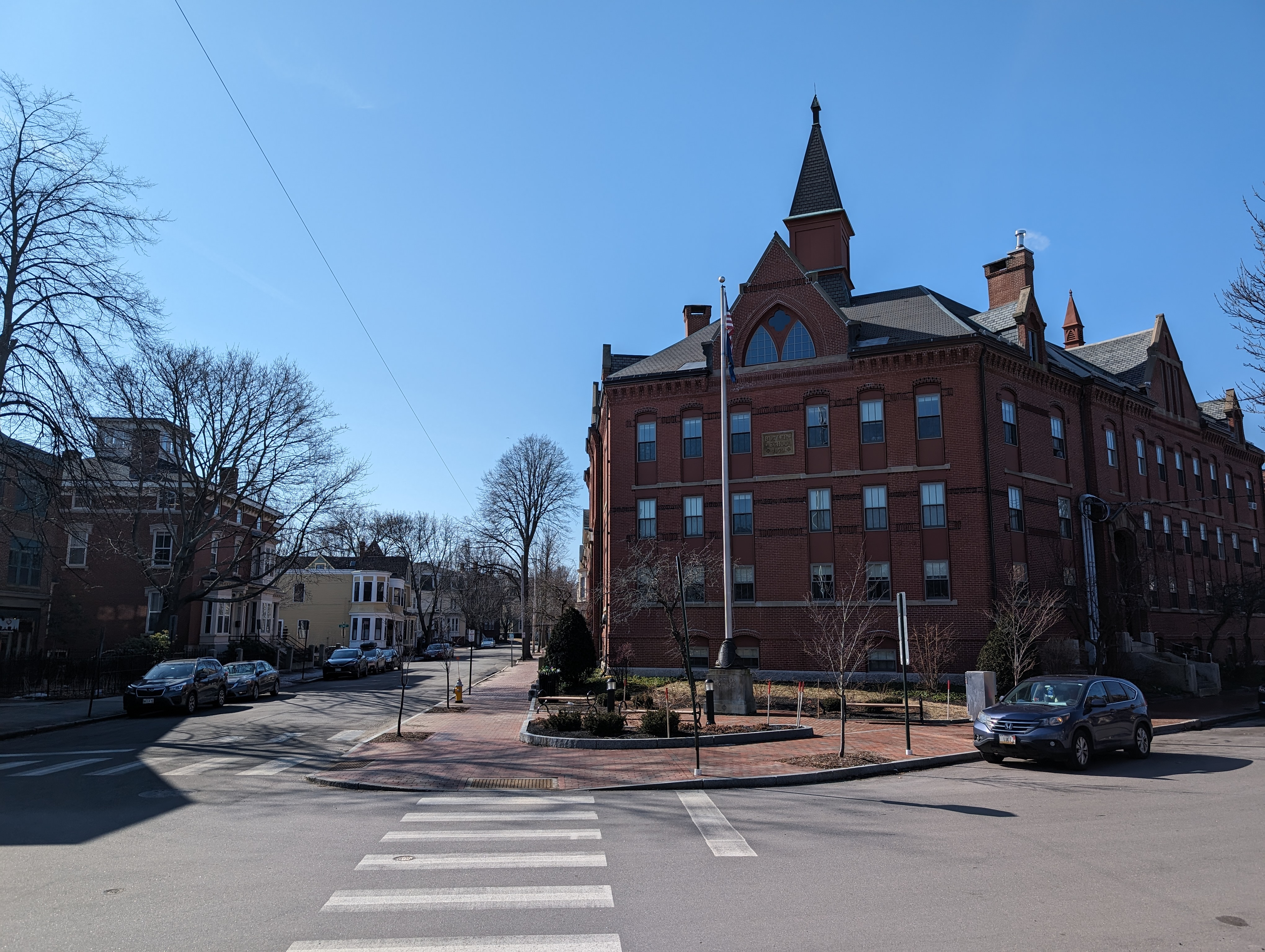
- Maintained by: City of Portland
- Location: Portland, Maine, U.S.
- Coordinates: 43.6507°N 70.2692°W

Construction
- Completion: 1919

Harold T. Andrews Square is a public square and World War I memorial in Portland, Maine, United States. Located at the intersection of Clark, Pine, and West Streets in the West End neighborhood, the former Butler School is adjacent to the square.

== Harold T. Andrews ==
The square's namesake is Harold Taylor Andrews, a resident of the West End and the first Maine soldier killed during the previous war on November 30, 1917. His father, William M. Andrews, was the longtime principal of the Butler School.

== Dedications ==
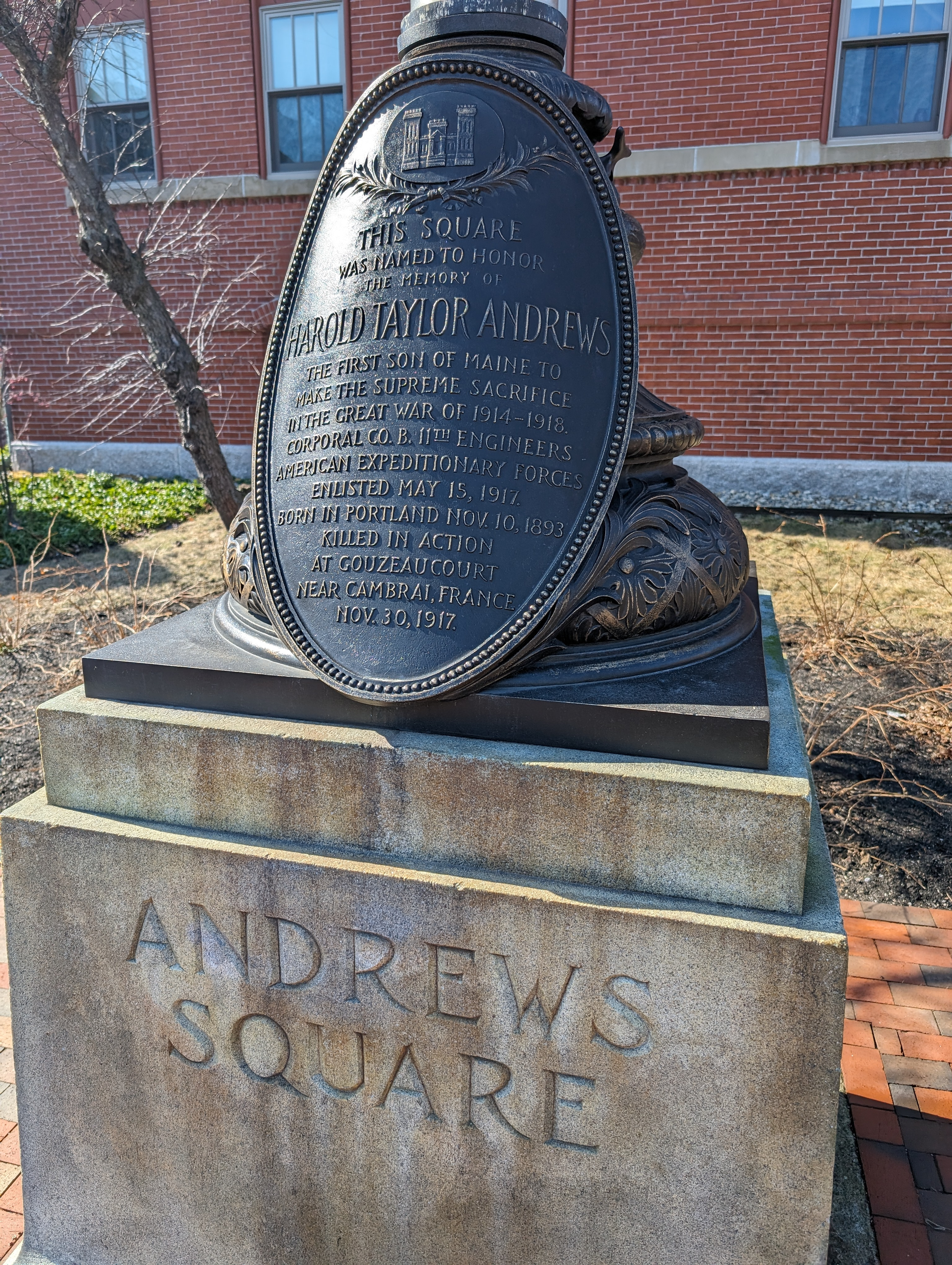
A memorial to World War I veteran Harold T. Andrews in Andrews Square, Portland, Maine, United States.

On Armistice Day 1919, Portland staged parades and memorials honoring those who had fought and died in the Great War. Part of these ceremonies included a gathering which dedicated the intersection to Harold T. Andrews. During the ceremony, a seaplane flew over the square, dropping a bushel of flowers. In December 1921, another gathering was staged in the square which dedicated a bronze plaque. A crowd of thousands gathered to listen to speeches from mayor Carroll Chaplin and Amelia McCudden, whose son James McCudden was a well-known British flying ace killed in action during the war. The renaming of the square and constructing of the memorial was organized by the Portland Rotary Club. In 2015, the granite and bronze memorial was re-dedicated in a ceremony involving veterans groups, city councilor Edward Suslovic, and U.S. Senator Angus King.

The plaque on the memorial reads:
"THIS SQUARE WAS NAMED TO HONOR THE MEMORY OF HAROLD TAYLOR ANDREWS THE FIRST SON OF MAINE TO MAKE THE SUPREME SACRIFICE IN THE GREAT WAR OF 1914–1918. CORPORAL CO. B. 11TH ENGINEERS AMERICAN EXPEDITIONARY FORCES
ENLISTED MAY, 15, 1917.
BORN IN PORTLAND NOV. 10, 1893
KILLED IN ACTION
AT GOUZEAUCOURT
NEAR CAMBRAI, FRANCE
NOV. 30, 1917."
