= Seth F. Clark =

American politician

Seth F. Clark (November 30, 1865-March 15, 1951) was an American politician from Maine. A Democrat from Portland, Clark served two terms in the Maine House of Representatives (1911 – 1912, 1913 – 1914). He served as secretary of the Committee for Inland Fisheries and Wildlife.

Clark was born in Portland and graduated from Deering High School. A lifelong Democrat, Clark served as chair of the Cumberland County Democratic Committee.

During the 1912 presidential election, Clark served as treasurer of a political club supporting Democratic nominee Woodrow Wilson. As of February 1913, Clark was chairman of the Cumberland County Democratic Party. In November 1913, he was appointed by Woodrow Wilson to the position of appraiser of merchandise for the Port of Portland, a lucrative patronage position. He replaced Republican George H. Allan after Wilson's successful presidential campaign captured the presidency for the Democrats for the first time since 1896.

Clark died in 1951 and is interred at Portland's Evergreen Cemetery.
