= Lafayette Hotel (Portland, Maine) =

Coordinates: 43°39′12″N 70°15′54″W

The Lafayette Hotel (now Lafayette Apartments) is a historic building in Portland, Maine, United States. Completed in 1903, the building was designed to be a luxury hotel and many of Maine's political and economic elites maintained year-round residences in the hotel. In the 1960s, the building was converted to an apartment building.

It is located at 638 Congress Street, at the intersection of Park Avenue in the West End. It was built where Gilbert du Motier, Marquis de Lafayette, stayed during his visit to the city in 1825. It was designed by architects Francis H. Fassett and his son, Edward F. Fassett and opened in June 1903. It was considered to be fireproof upon opening. The original proprietor was James Cunningham. It was notable for its Mayfair Ballroom and French motifs. The hotel advertised its adherence to the American Plan, which indicated the company's unwillingness to recognize or negotiate with trade unions.

Between 2018 and 2025, Sagamore Hill Lounge occupied part of the first floor. It was replaced by Marquis Lounge in 2026.
