= Howard C. Reiche Community School =

Howard C. Reiche School
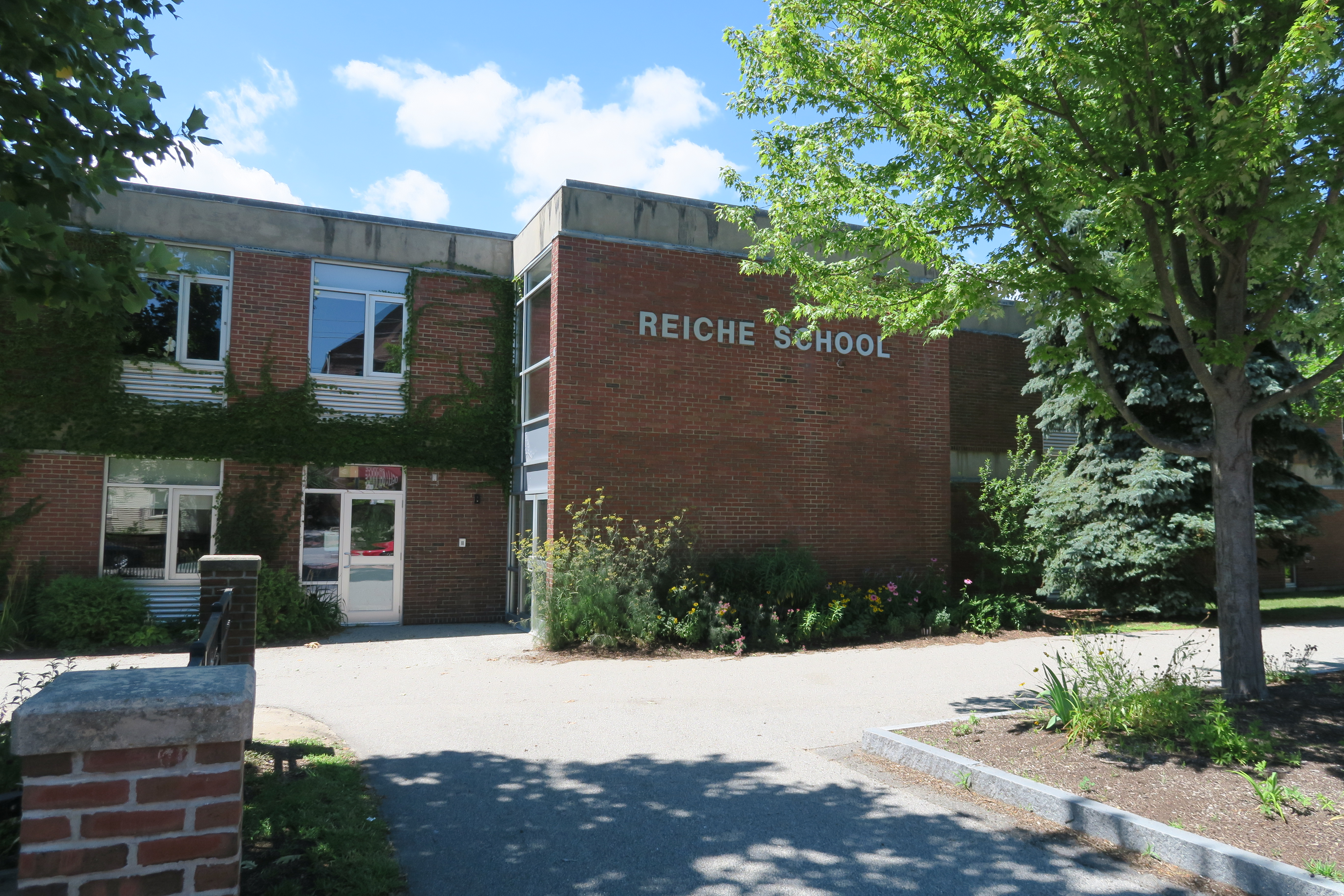
- Howard C. Reiche Community School

Location
- 166 Brackett Street; Portland, Maine 04102; United States; 43°39′01″N 70°16′02″W

Information
- Founded: 1973
- Grades: K–5
- Enrollment: 434 (2016-17)
- Website: reiche.portlandschools.org

The Howard C. Reiche Community School is an elementary school in the West End of Portland, Maine.

The school building was constructed in the 1970s and opened in 1973. It replaced the nearby Butler School, which had been in operation since 1879. Buildings in a four-block area were demolished to make room for the school and playground, which was built according to an open-plan design. The two-story building, occupying 5.2 acres (2.1 ha), was designed for 371 students. It was designed by Portland architect Wilbur R. Ingalls Jr. and named for Howard Charles Reiche Sr., former principal of Portland High School.

As of 2004, the school was the main elementary school for English as an additional language (ESL) students in the Portland Public Schools. ESL instruction began at Reiche in 1981 in response to an influx of Asian immigrants in the school's neighborhood after Portland's designation in 1980 as a refugee resettlement city. As of 2004 there were 515 students in the school, of whom 60 percent were from ethnic or linguistic minority groups and of whom 88 percent received free or reduced-price lunches. The students spoke 27 different languages other than English in their homes, including Arabic, Spanish, Somali, Khmer, Vietnamese, Serbo-Croatian, and Acholi.

There were about 300 students enrolled for the 2010–2011 school year.

A branch library of the Portland Public Library was located in Reiche School from 1974 until 2010, when the library branch closed. Its space is now occupied by a new community policing center. The building also houses a community health clinic, a community swimming pool, a community gym and locker rooms, and other community center facilities.

In 1991–1992, Reiche School was designated a Blue Ribbon School by the U.S. Department of Education. In both 2003 and 2004 it was listed as failing to meet federal standards under the No Child Left Behind program. After the initial listing was announced in 2003, Reiche's "failing" rating was criticized by the principal of another Portland elementary school, located in an affluent neighborhood, that had been identified as one of Maine's best-performing schools. Longfellow School principal Dawn Carrigan was quoted in the Bangor Daily News comparing her school's results with Reiche's and stating her opinion that "there is no good reason to create public lists that compare schools, particularly when students come from different backgrounds." In subsequent years, Reiche school succeeded in getting off the "failing" list by making Adequate Yearly Progress.

In June 2011, Reiche announced it would become a teacher-led school, forgoing the more common principal leadership. It became one of the few schools in Maine to try the model.
