= William Minott House =

Historic house in Maine, United States

- U.S. National Register of Historic Places
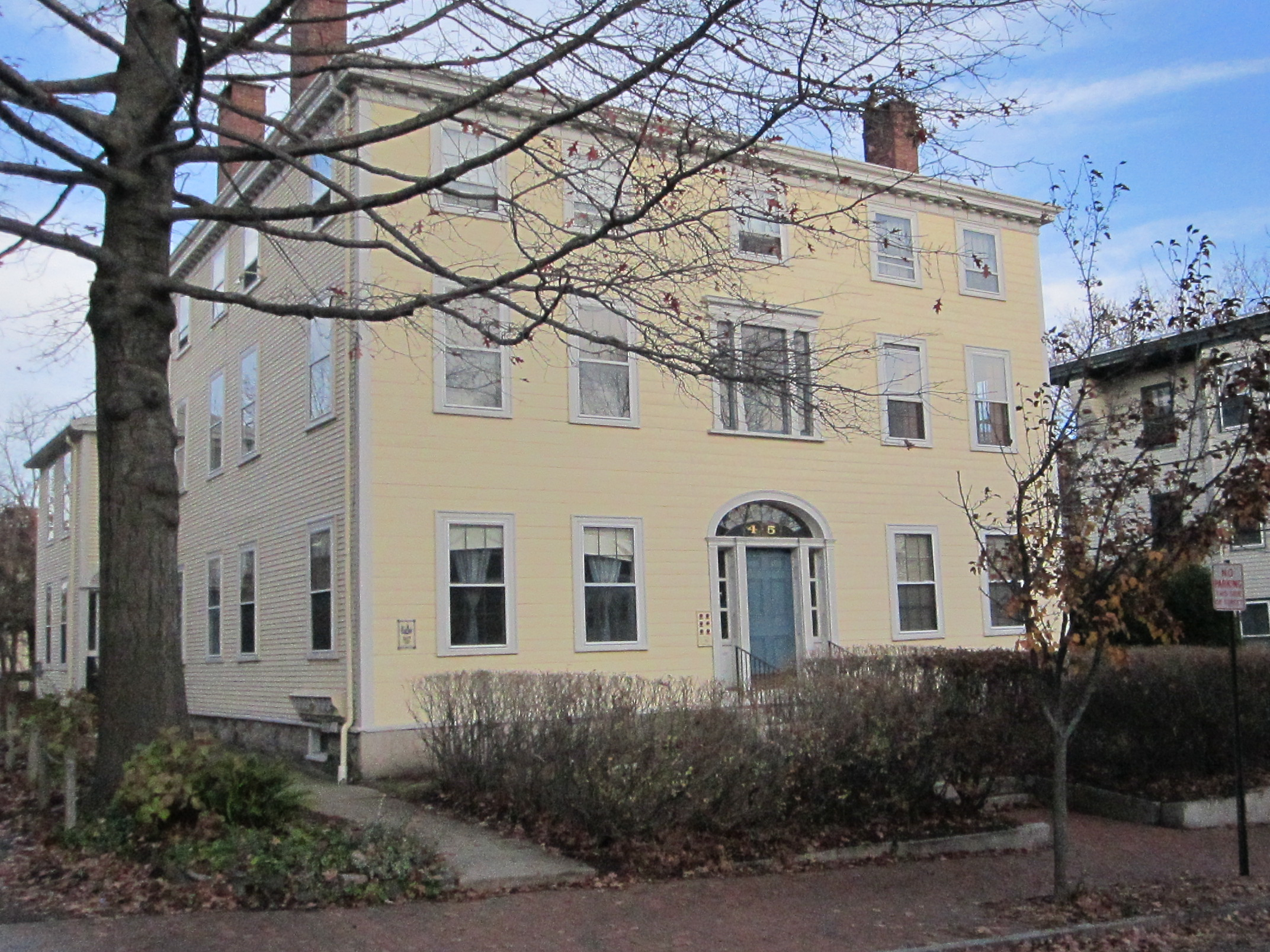
- The William Minott House in November 2011

- Location within Maine Location within the United States
- Location: 45 Park Street, Portland, Maine
- Coordinates: 43°39′3″N 70°15′38″W
- Area: 0.3 acres (0.12 ha)
- Built: 1805
- Architect: William Minott
- Architectural style: Federal
- NRHP reference No.: 79000142
- Added to NRHP: July 10, 1979

The William Minott House is a historic house at 45 Park Street in Portland, Maine. It is one of Portland's few Federal period houses, notably surviving the city's devastating 1866 fire. It was listed on the National Register of Historic Places on July 10, 1979.

== History ==
The house was built in 1805 by William Minott, a housewright, and was enlarged by him in 1807 into a three-family, providing space for the families of his two sons. The house is somewhat typical of houses in the area prior to Portland's 1866 fire. It has remained as a multiunit residence to this day, although it deteriorated and was threatened with demolition in 1976, prior to a major restoration.

== Description ==
The house is located on the east side of Portland's West End, at the northern corner of Park and Nye Streets. It is a three-story wood-frame structure, with low-pitch hip roof, four end chimneys, clapboard siding, and a granite foundation. A two-story ell extends to the rear and extends beyond the sides of the main block by one bay on each side. The main facade is five bays wide, with a central entrance framed by sidelight windows and topped by a semi-oval transom. On the second floor, above the entrance, is a three-part window, with narrow sections flanking a central fixed pane. The projecting bays of the rear addition also have entrances in the front-facing bays, with similar Federal styling. The interior of the main block reflects a typical Federal period central-hall plan.

== See also ==
- National Register of Historic Places listings in Portland, Maine
