= Edward Whittemore =

American novelist

- Born: Edward Payson Whittemore; May 26, 1933; Manchester, New Hampshire, U.S.
- Died: August 3, 1995 (aged 62); New York, New York, U.S.
- Education: Deering High School; Yale University
- Occupation: Novelist

Edward Payson Whittemore (May 26, 1933 – August 3, 1995) was an American novelist, the author of five novels written between 1974 and 1987, four of which comprised his Jerusalem Quartet series. Following a tour of service with the United States Marine Corps, he was worked as a case officer in the Central Intelligence Agency, stationed in Japan and Italy, between 1958 and 1967.

== Biography and writing career ==
The youngest of five children, Whittemore was born on May 26, 1933, in Manchester, New Hampshire, US to John Cambridge Whittemore, a commercial district manager for the New England Telephone and Telegraph Company, and his wife Elizabeth Payson Whittemore. He graduated from Deering High School, Portland, Maine, in 1951, and went to Yale shortly after, where he obtained a degree in history.

He joined the United States Marine Corps and served as an officer on a tour of duty in Japan. He was later recruited to the CIA, working undercover as a reporter from 1958 until 1967, stationed in Japan and later in Italy.

It was during this time that Whittemore began working on the novels for which he is probably best known. These constitute the Jerusalem Quartet. His earlier book, Quin's Shanghai Circus (1974), contains the seeds of his series.

His books received mixed reviews. Reviewing Quin's Shanghai Circus (1974), Jerome Charyn of New York Times Book Review praised Whittemore's "ability to mythologize our recent past, to turn history into a mode of fiction …" J.S. in Time said that he introduced "freakish impossibility" and that his book "lurched."

Whittemore's Sinai Tapestry (1977) also received mixed reviews. Anthony Heilbut of The Nation compared him favorably to Pynchon, Nabokov and Fuentes, but argued that his writing was more "lucid" and that he achieved "the solidity of history itself." Erik Korn of Times Literary Supplement was much more critical. The second book of The Jerusalem Quartet, Jerusalem Poker, was also roughly received by some. Harper's Magazine praised this novel as well as its "amplification" of the previous one. On the other hand, science fiction author and critic Thomas M. Disch gave Jerusalem Poker a very negative review in the Times Literary Supplement, describing Whittemore as a Reader's Digest version of Pynchon, with a "genteel poverty of imagination."

The original editions failed to achieve commercial success; about 3,000 hardcover and 10,000 paperback copies of each novel were sold. Whittemore was jealous of his privacy and refused to give interviews to "unknown correspondents," an attitude that hampered his publisher's promotion effort.

Edward Whittemore spent the final years of his life in poverty. He died on August 3, 1995, in New York City, shortly after being diagnosed with prostate cancer.

== Works ==
- Quin's Shanghai Circus (1974)

=== The Jerusalem Quartet ===
- Sinai Tapestry (1977)
- Jerusalem Poker (1978)
- Nile Shadows (1983)
- Jericho Mosaic (1987)
