= Josh Longstaff =

American basketball coach (born 1982)

Charlotte Hornets
- Position: Assistant coach
- League: NBA

Personal information
- Born: August 6, 1982 (age 44) Portland, Maine, U.S.
- Listed height: 5 ft 9 in (1.75 m)

Career information
- High school: Portland (Portland, Maine)
- College: Bryant (2001–2005)
- Coaching career: 2010–present

Career history

Coaching
- 2005–2008: Portland HS (assistant)
- 2008–2010: Gorham HS
- 2010–2014: Oklahoma City Thunder (assistant)
- 2014–2017: New York Knicks (assistant)
- 2017–2018: Erie BayHawks
- 2018–2020: Milwaukee Bucks (assistant)
- 2020–2024: Chicago Bulls (assistant)
- 2024—present: Charlotte Hornets (assistant)

Joshua Longstaff (born August 6, 1982) is an American basketball coach. He is an assistant coach with the Charlotte Hornets of the National Basketball Association. He was previously the head coach of the Erie BayHawks, and an assistant coach with the Milwaukee Bucks, Oklahoma City Thunder and New York Knicks of the National Basketball Association (NBA).

== Coaching career ==
Prior to joining the Oklahoma City Thunder in 2010, he spent five years as a high school coach – two seasons as the head coach at Gorham High School after three seasons as an assistant coach at his alma mater of Portland High School.

Longstaff joined the New York Knicks after spending four seasons with the Oklahoma City Thunder. He was previously an assistant coach for the Oklahoma City Thunder and New York Knicks of the National Basketball Association (NBA).

He originally joined the Thunder as player personnel and video coordinator, then spent his final three seasons as video analyst and player development coach. He joined the Latvia national basketball team for the summer of 2017 so he could work with Kristaps Porziņģis during EuroBasket 2017. On May 22, 2017, he was fired by the Knicks.

In 2017, he was named the first head coach of the expansion Erie BayHawks, the Atlanta Hawks' NBA G League affiliate. After one season and leading the team to the conference finals, he was hired as assistant coach with the Milwaukee Bucks.

On November 14, 2020, he was hired as an assistant coach with the Chicago Bulls.

== Personal life ==
A native of Portland, Maine, he was a four-year letterman at Bryant University, graduating in 2005 with a degree in marketing. While at Bryant, he was coached by Brian Keefe, whom he later joined on the staff of the Oklahoma City Thunder. After leaving the Oklahoma City Thunder, Josh joined the New York Knicks and Derek Fisher's staff as an assistant coach. After leaving the Knicks, he spent one season in the G-League as head coach of the Erie BayHawks. The following season, Longstaff joined the staff of coach Mike Budenholzer and the Milwaukee Bucks as an assistant coach specializing in player development.
