= Casco Bay High School =

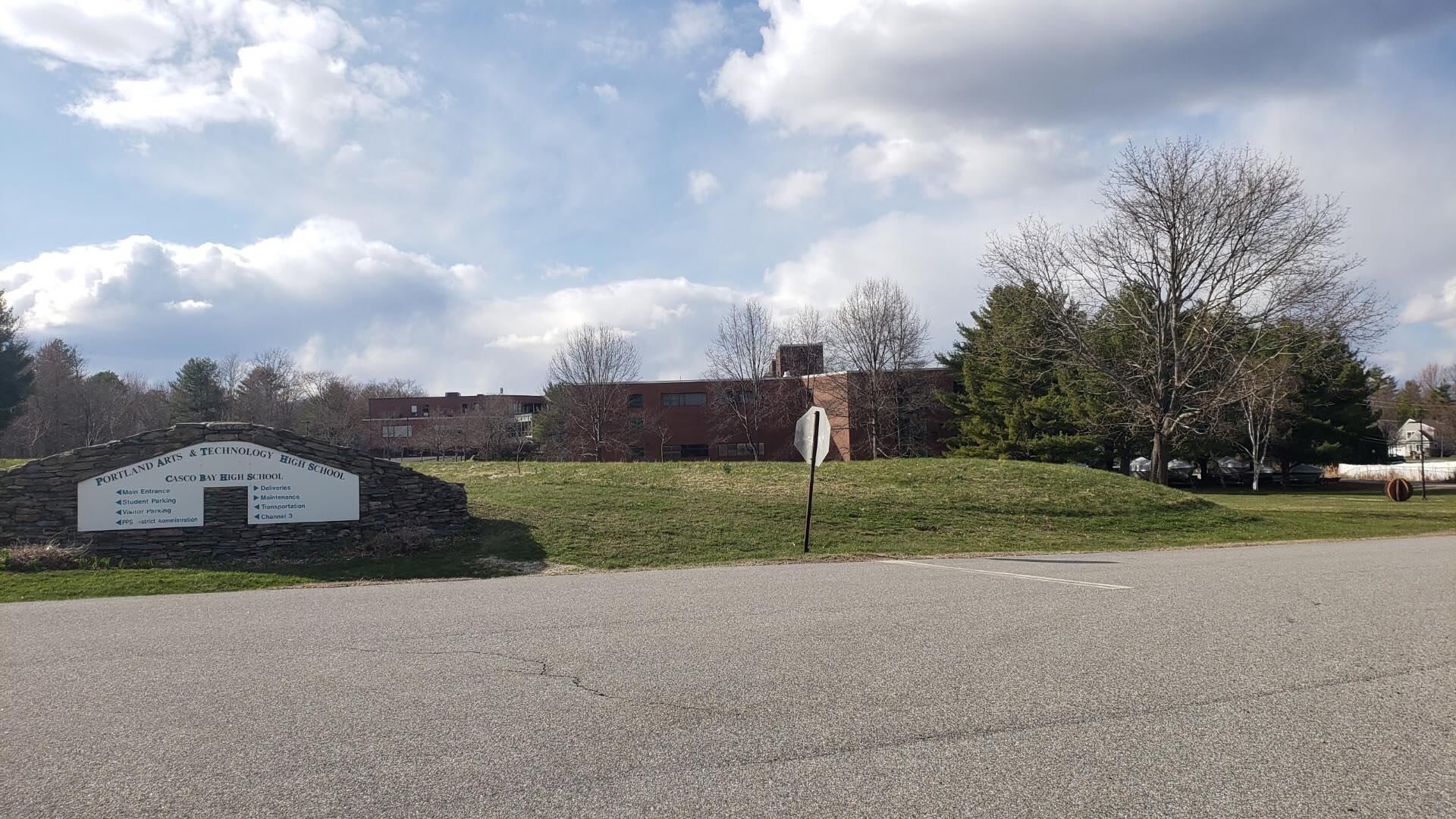
- Casco Bay High School in 2020

Location
- 196 Allen Avenue (2nd floor); North Deering; Portland, Cumberland, Maine 04103; United States; 43°41′50″N 70°17′38″W

Information
- School type: Public
- Established: 2005
- School district: Portland Public Schools
- CEEB code: 200804
- Principal: Priya Natarajan
- Teaching staff: 28.80 (FTE)
- Grades: 9-12
- Student to teacher ratio: 13.16
- Hours in school day: 6.5
- Colors: Teal and Black
- Mascot: Cougar
- Website: cbhs.portlandschools.org

Casco Bay High School is a public high school in Portland, Maine, United States. Casco Bay High School describes itself as an Expeditionary Learning educational experience, which the school describes as being based on the Outward Bound learning system.

Since the 2005–06 school year, the school has shared a facility with Portland Arts and Technology High School on Allen Avenue, in the city's North Deering neighborhood. Casco Bay is one of three public high schools within Portland Public Schools, the other two being Portland High School and Deering High School. Unlike the other two high schools, however, enrollment at Casco Bay is limited due to the physical size of the building and more individualized learning model. Each high school in Portland must admit students who live within a certain proximity, but Casco Bay High School also admits students who live elsewhere in Portland. Public schools are not allowed to choose their students or use any kind of application system, and their student body demographics must be representative of those of the city of Portland, so Casco Bay High School uses a lottery system.

Opening in 2005, Casco Bay High made Portland the first city in the United States to offer Expeditionary Learning from kindergarten to 12th grade. Every year after, Casco Bay added a grade level, with 70 students per grade, and the school now has all grade levels attending (9-12) with 100 students per grade. The school has won numerous awards, and in 2012 was named the 8th best high school in Maine, and in 2018, it was named one of Maine’s top high schools by U.S. News & World Report, and the #5 high school in Maine by Niche.com in 2019. 98% of its graduates have been accepted to college. It is also one of the few high schools in Maine to offer Independent Study courses to Junior and Senior students. These are student-designed courses that can range from a study of 19th-century Literature to an exploration of Quantum Mechanics.

Casco Bay High School is known for its high graduation and college acceptance rates, “Intensive” courses (weeklong courses offered twice annually on more niche subjects not typically available in high school, such as Sabermetrics, Outdoor Sports, Forensic Chemistry, Labor Movements, and many others), and rigorous expeditions (large projects spanning multiple disciplines).

Casco Bay High School enrolls up to a maximum of 400 students per year, currently serving 391.

Crew

Every student at Casco Bay High School is assigned to peer groups known as crews designed to facilitate inclusivity and faculty mentor relationships. The students stay in the same crew for all four years (however, not necessarily retaining the same faculty advisor). A crew is a group of 10 to 15 students and one faculty member. Activities are held within the crew every day of the week. Crews in the freshman and senior grades are sent on a 3-night, 4-day Rippleffect mini-expedition. For that week, students will kayak in Casco Bay in order to get to know their crew members. Many students feel that the experience is a very positive one. Active members on this trip receive 0.5 credits for physical education. Each crew also attends a shorter camping trip sophomore year, known as Sophomore Solo, then completes an associated project, referred to as Sophomore Passage, in which they discuss (and demonstrate) their passions and goals for the future in a 30 minute presentation in front of their Crew. Crews also go on “Senior Quest” together, another overnight trip on Cow Island, where the crew members (“crewbies”, as they are affectionate known) have a chance to bond and reconnect before their senior year.

Crews meet every day for 30 minutes and usually spend the time discussing a “question of the day”, catching up, going over upcoming school events, checking in with each other and their crew advisor about their academic standing, or, on “Fun Friday” (a longer crew period on Fridays), playing games and sharing food.

Crews also participate and compete in many of the school’s unique traditions together, including Winter Carnival (a day dedicated to crews competing in a selection of student-run unusual carnival games, such as “Cheeto Head”, where students wear a shaving cream-covered shower cap while a partner throws Cheetos at them and scores a point for each Cheeto that sticks, “Wheelie Chair Races”, etc.) and Cardboard Boat Races.

Crew serves as a built-in support system, time to relax and play, time to receive academic support and advice, time to get administrative tasks done, and time to discuss important current issues facing the school community.

== Junior Journey ==
An integral part of a student's experience at Casco Bay High School is their Junior Journey. Each year, the entire junior class is given the opportunity to plan a class trip to a location where one can experience a new culture and service learning. To date, all Junior Journeys have been executed in association with Habitat for Humanity in Biloxi MS, Almost Heaven, WV, Rockaway, NY, Detroit, MI, Red Hook, NY, and Millinocket, ME. During the trip, which is entirely funded by the students' own fundraising efforts, the junior class spends time volunteering, team building and bonding, bettering the community, creating a full-length documentary movie, and taking in local culture, history, and landmarks. Participation in Junior Journey earns 0.5 elective credits.

== Administration ==
Derek Pierce was Casco Bay's founding principal, serving since the school's opening in 2005 through the 2023-2024 academic year. In 2014, he won Nellie Mae's Larry O'Toole Award for exhibiting "great leadership through innovation or courage in moving student-centered approaches to learning forward". CBHS received $100,000 as a result. Two years later in 2016, Pierce was named Maine Principal of the Year by the Maine Principal's Association.

In 2024, Priya Natarajan took over as principal after Derek Pierce's retirement. With the support of numerous founding faculty members who still teach at the school (including, but not limited to: David Burke, Stewart Croft, and Susan McCray), Natarajan continues to uphold and honor all Casco Bay High School traditions, quests, and expeditions.
