= Butler School (Portland, Maine) =

Historic school building in Portland, Maine

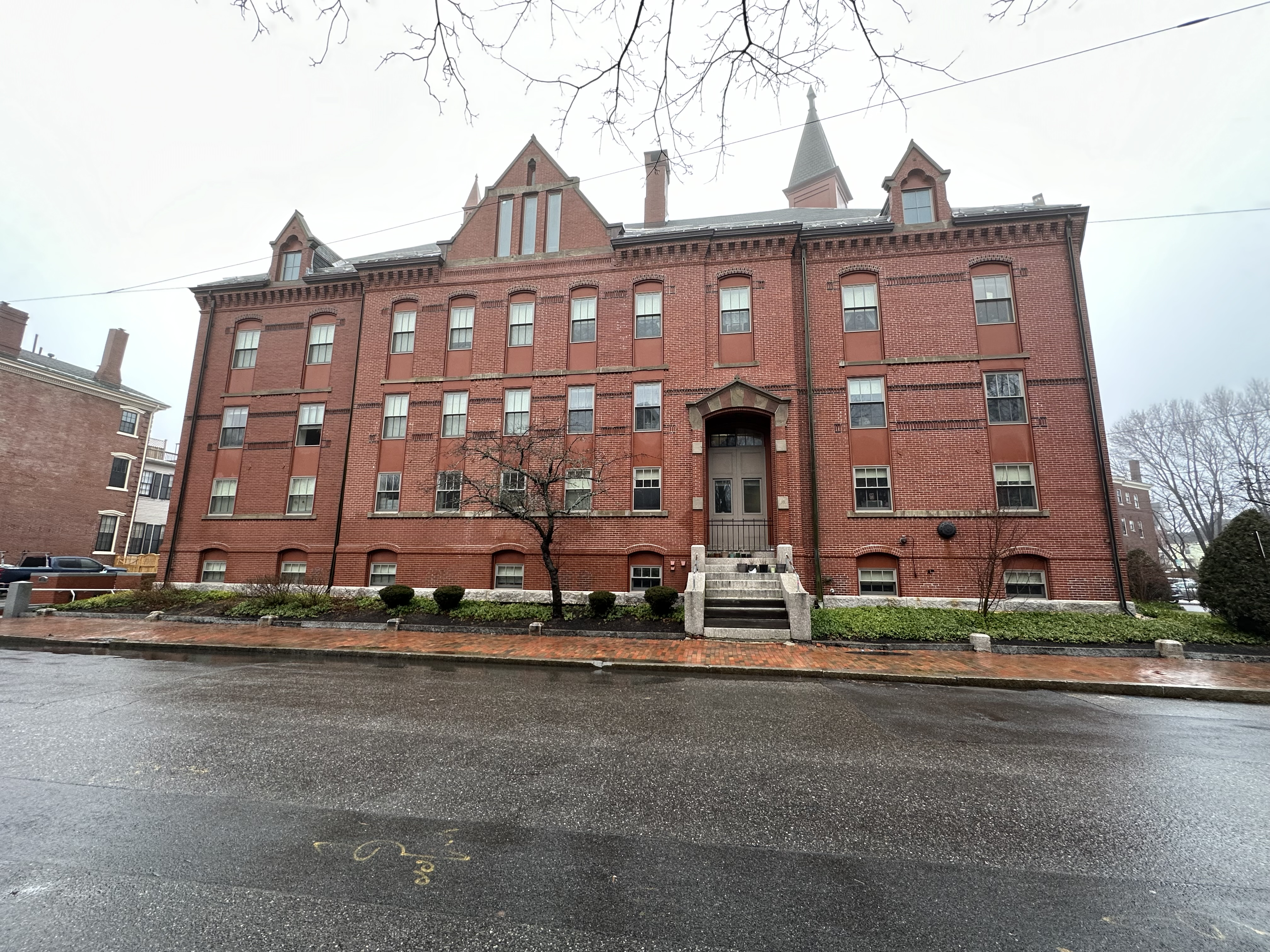
The building in 2024

The Butler School is a historic schoolhouse turned apartment building in Portland, Maine, United States. Built from 1878 to 1879 at the cost of $8,000, the building served as an elementary school for West End students until 1973. It is located on Pine Street in Andrews Square. It is named for Moses M. Butler, who was mayor from 1877 to 1879. It was designed by local architect Francis H. Fassett in the High Victorian Gothic style; Fassett lived in the neighborhood and also designed many other nearby buildings on the Western Promenade. It was built to replace nearby Brackett Street School and itself was replaced by Howard C. Reiche Community School, which was built a block away on Brackett Street. It did not have a playground until 1945.

== Apartments ==
After the school's closure, the building was eventually converted into apartments. In 2011, the building was purchased by Avesta Housing and run as affordable housing. Avesta also did major upgrades to the building's heating and cooling systems. In 2019, the non-profit organization Maine Preservation described the building as "exhibiting the leading architectural trends of the era."

== Notable alumni ==
- James Phinney Baxter III
- Percival P. Baxter
- William Moulton Ingraham
- Kenneth Sills
