= Deering High School =

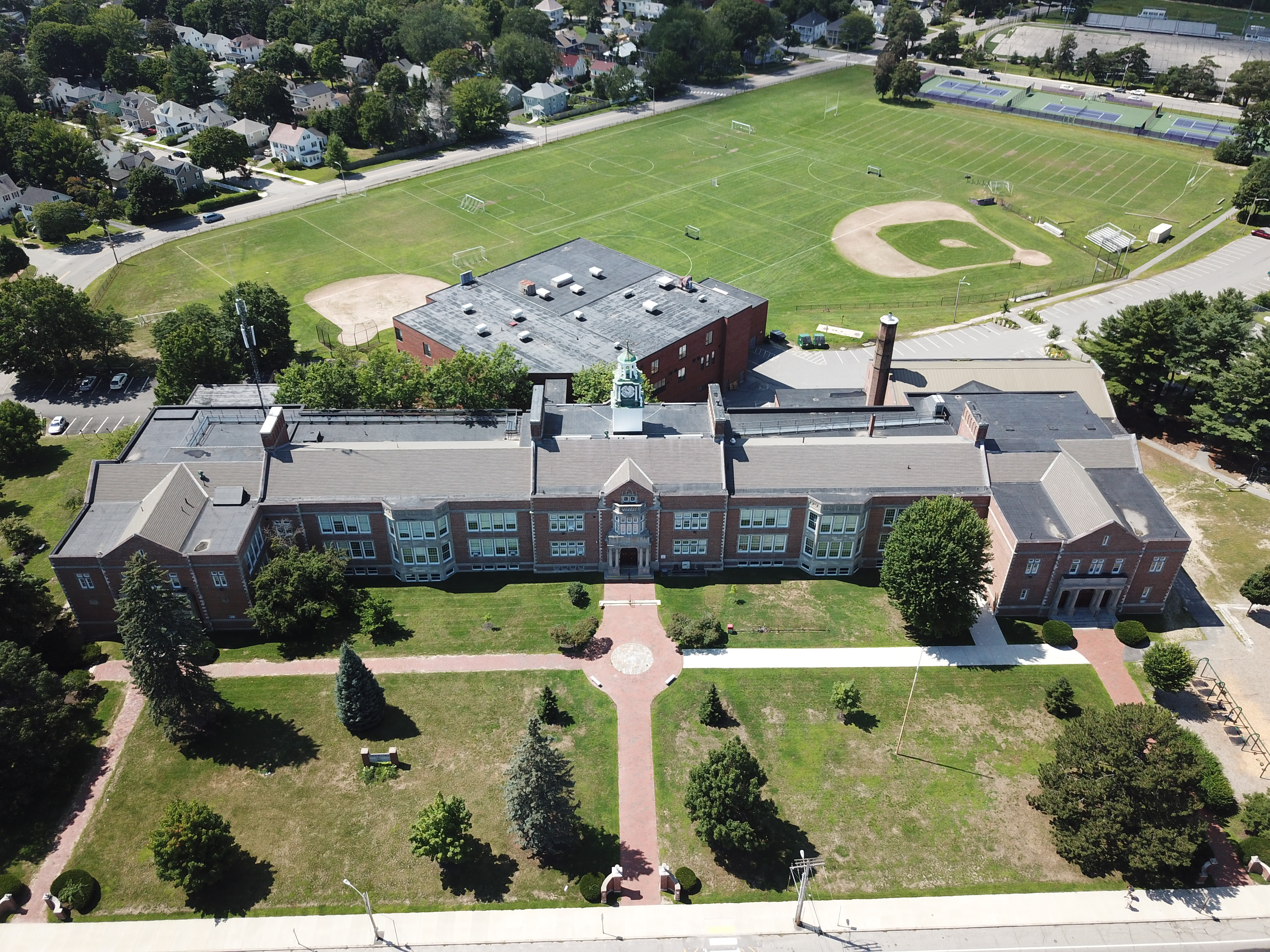

Location
- 370 Stevens Avenue; Portland, Maine; United States; 43°40′18″N 70°17′45″W

Information
- Type: Public secondary
- Established: 1874
- School district: Portland Public Schools
- Principal: Carlie Frederick, Alice Buckley, Caitlin Miller, Melissa Labbe (Interim Administrators)
- Teaching staff: 60.90 (FTE)
- Grades: 9–12
- Enrollment: 750 (2022-2023)
- Student to teacher ratio: 12.32
- Campus: Suburban
- Colors: Purple and White
- Mascot: Rams
- Rival: Portland High School
- Accreditation: New England Association of Schools and Colleges
- Newspaper: Breccia
- Yearbook: The Amethyst
- Website: https://dhs.portlandschools.org/

Deering High School (DHS) is a public high school on Stevens Avenue in Portland, Maine, United States. The school is part of the Portland Public Schools district. It is one of the three public high schools located in Portland, the others being Portland High School and Casco Bay High School. Along with Portland High, enrollment to Deering is open choice.

== History ==
In 1871, the town Deering seceded from Westbrook. Deering High School was established in 1874. The school opened in Morgen's Hall, a one-room wooden structure at Morrill's Corner in the autumn of 1874 with 31 students attending. Before the end of the year, the high school moved to the Heseltine Grammar School on Ocean Avenue for four years.

The town Deering was annexed by the City of Portland in 1898. The enabling act before the state legislature included a provision about the high school. Fred Matthews, a graduate of Deering High School who was an attorney and legislator, proposed the provision for the "continuing" maintenance always of a high school in Deering of equal grade and standing to what was in a Portland. This led to Portland having two high schools.

Just before the building was to be occupied, Crosby was killed by a train at Woodfords Crossing during a rain storm. His term was completed by Mr. Swan and Mr. Hill. On January 30, 1898, the new Deering High School was opened with William H. Marvin as principal. The Assembly Hall, which was located on the third floor, was dedicated to Mr. Crosby and remained in his name until the hall was renovated into a library. The first Deering High School building eventually became Longfellow Elementary School.

During the 1976 school year, The Deering High School Study Committee was formed to assess the physical plan and program offerings. During the 1978 school year, a DHS Building Committee with architectural firm Wadsworth, Boston, Dimick, Mercer & Weatherill began designing an addition. Construction began in the summer of 1981 when David Wallace became the school principal. Hale continued on the staff as the Building Project Coordinator. With the 1982–83 school year, students and staff utilized the newly constructed and renovated areas of Deering High School.

Deering High School was among the first schools named a National School of Excellence by the US Department of Education in 1983.

In 1985, Paul A. Pendleton became the school's principal. Under his leadership, the provisions of Maine's Educational Reform Act were implemented, and a ten-year NEASC re-accreditation was awarded. The Portland School Committee confirmed Jan C. Patton as the school's first female principal in July 1992. Patton served three years. The challenge of her tenure was the successful planning for and adoption of block scheduling.

By 2014, the school had a student population of 1,022 students and offered Advanced Placement coursework.

== Curriculum ==
Deering was one of 34 high schools nationally which had joined the International Studies School Network, which is part of the Asia Society. The school later chose to not renew its ISSN membership due to fees. In October 2013, Deering High School announced it would offer an Arabic language course as part of their new international curriculum. It was believed to be the first Arabic language course in Maine public schools.

== Sports ==
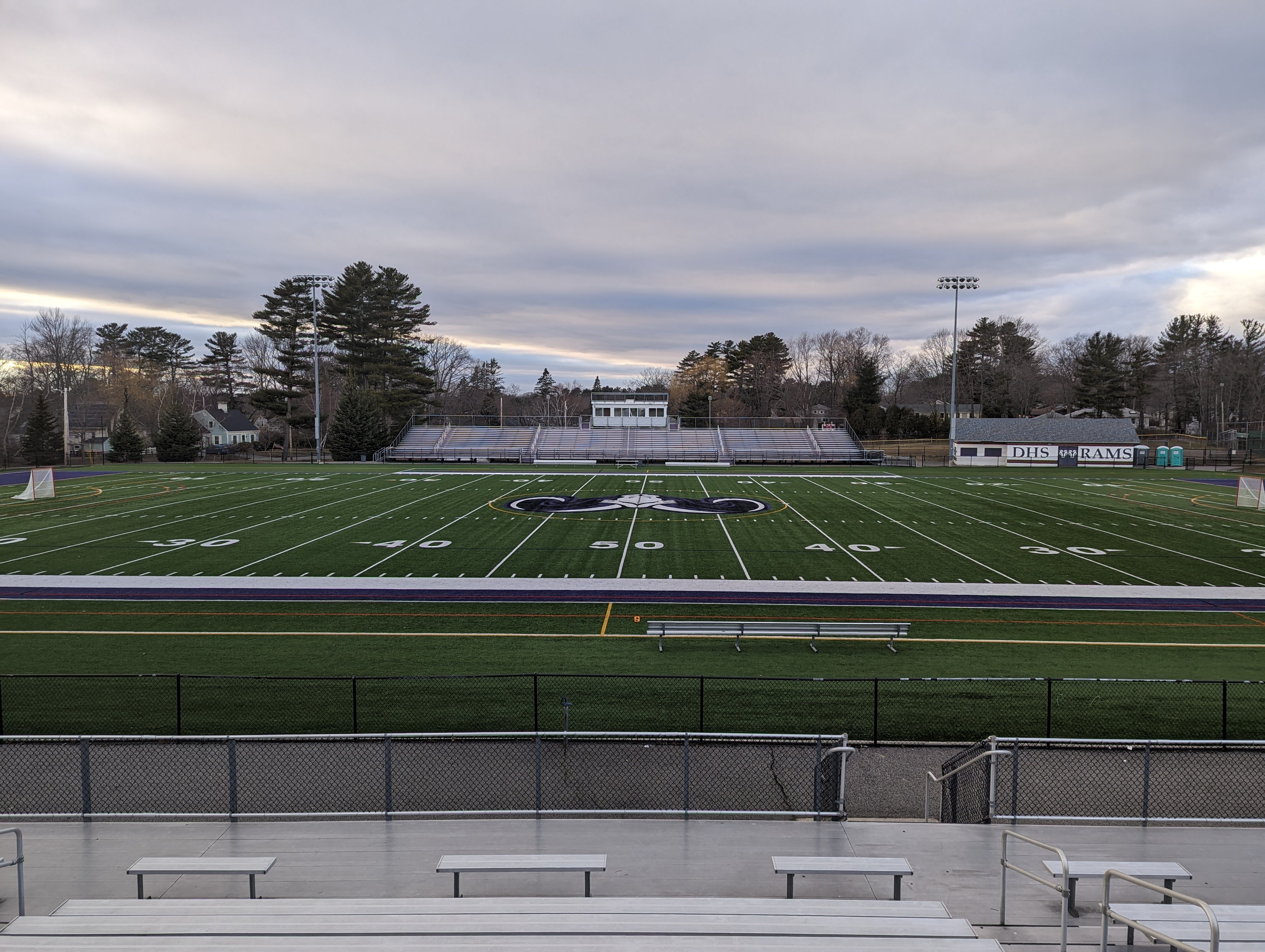
Memorial Stadium in March 2023.

Memorial Stadium is located on Ludlow Street near Deering High School, it is an artificial turf surface and is the home field for DHS outdoor sports teams.

The Deering Rams won the Maine Class A Boys' State Basketball Championship on March 3, 2012.

The Deering High School and Portland High School football teams have played each other each Thanksgiving since 1911, except for 1920 and 2020.

== Notable alumni ==
- Thomas H. Allen, United States Representative from Maine (1997–2009)
- William H. Brown Jr., television director and producer
- Nik Caner-Medley, professional basketball player
- Seth F. Clark, state legislator
- Don Favor, hammer thrower
- Ryan Flaherty, professional baseball player
- Irving Folwartshny, hammer and weight thrower
- Robert F. Griffin, CSC, writer
- Nathaniel Mervin Haskell, Governor of Maine
- Daniel Hobbs, politician
- Wilbur R. Ingalls Jr., architect
- Heidi Julavits, author
- Anna Kendrick, actress and singer (class of 2003)
- Linda Lavin, actress
- Bob Marley, stand-up comedian
- Andrea Martin, actress
- Ed Phillips, professional baseball pitcher for the Boston Red Sox
- Annie Proulx, writer
- Ryan Reid professional baseball player
- Fred C. Scribner Jr., under-secretary of the Treasury under Dwight D. Eisenhower, class of 1926.
- Earle G. Shettleworth Jr., state historian, Class of 1966
- Edward Whittemore, writer (class of 1951)
