= Rosa True School =

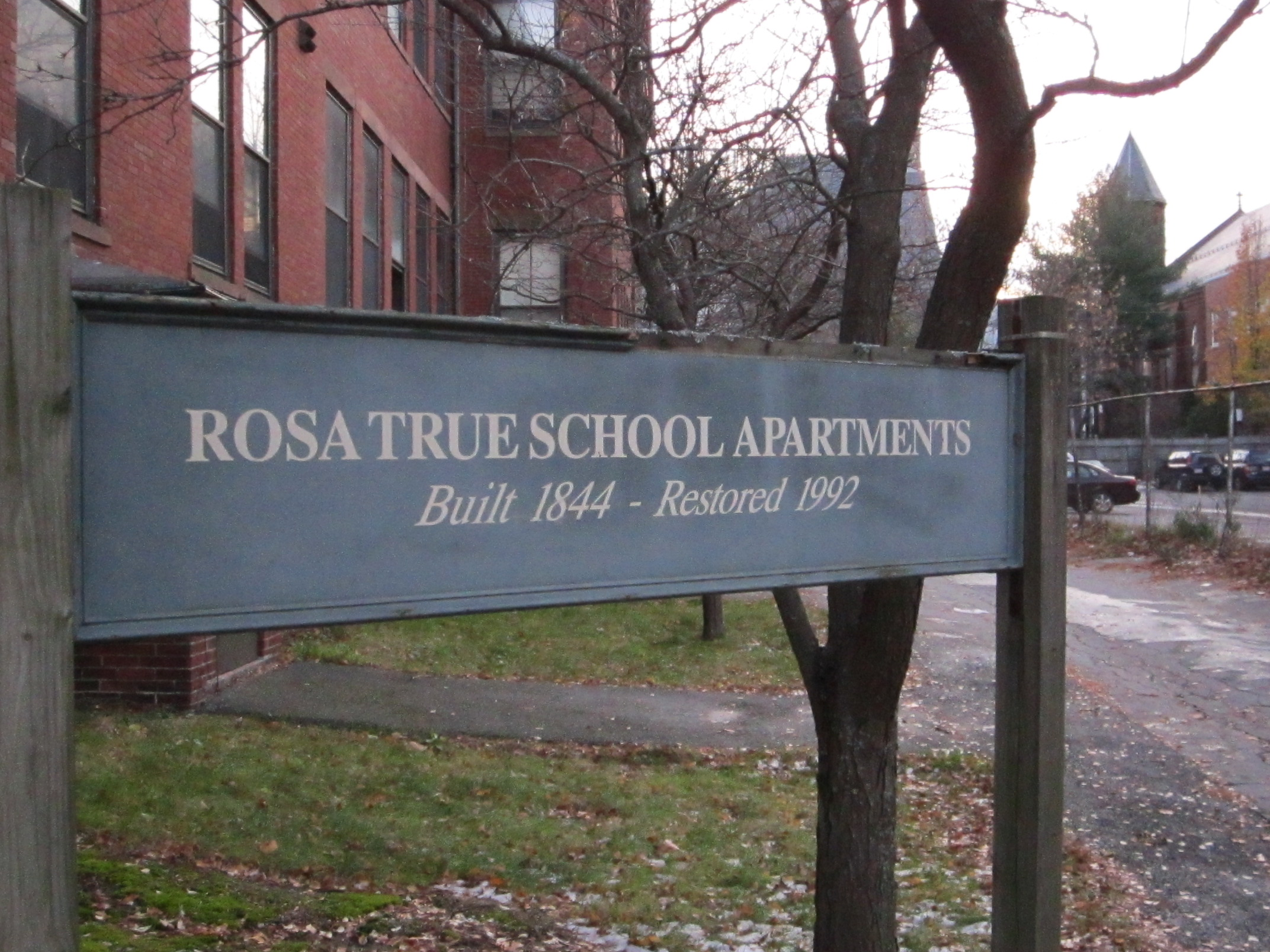
The Rosa True School in November 2011.

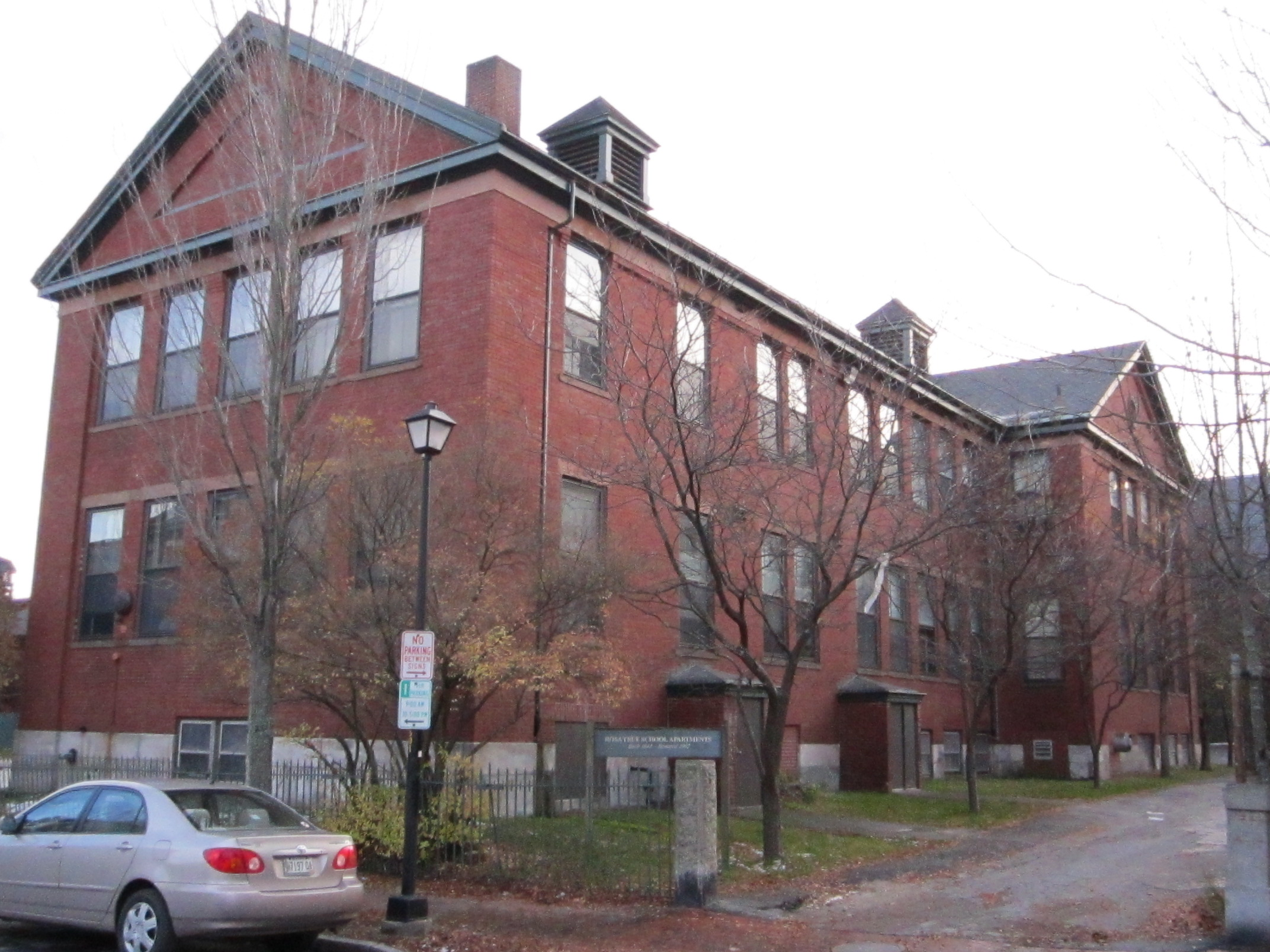
Full view of the Rosa True School.

The Rosa E. True School is an historic building on Park Street in Portland, Maine's West End. It opened as a public elementary school in 1844 and closed in 1972; upon the closing of the school, it had been in continuous use longer than any other school in the country.

In 1971, school principal Rodney E. Wells was charged with violating Maine's right to know laws when he withheld the school's enrollment information from a parent concerned over the hiring of a school employee.

In 1987, the historic preservation group Greater Portland Landmarks began involvement with the Rose True School with a $5,000 revolving loan to help convert the property into a multi-unit apartment building.

In 1992, the property was converted into 8 low income apartments primarily through local anti-gentrification efforts and the availability of tax credits. The redevelopment of the property also resulted in $900,000 put into the local economy and job training for young people.
