= Portland Public Schools (Maine) =

School district in Portland, Maine, United States

Location
- 353 Cumberland Avenue, Portland, ME 04101 United States

District information
- Type: Public
- Grades: K-12
- Established: 1733
- Superintendent: Ryan Scallon
- Schools: 18 (2016–2017)
- Budget: $103,602,884 (2017–2018)

Students and staff
- Students: 6,739 (2015–2016)
- Teachers: Approximately 700 (2016–2017)
- Staff: Approximately 1,300 (2016–2017)

Other information
- Website: Portland Public Schools

Portland Public Schools is the public school district in Portland, Maine, United States. The district operates eighteen primary and secondary schools. It is the largest and most ethnically diverse school district in Maine, with a student body made up of roughly 49% minorities. The district operates expeditionary learning schools, a vocational school, and elementary, middle, and three high schools (Casco Bay High School, Deering High School, and Portland High School).

== Demographics ==
The school district is the most diverse in the state. In 2021, about 49 percent of the district’s approximately 6,500 students identified as people of color, while about 11 percent of staff do. About one-third of the district’s students come from homes where languages other than English are spoken. More than 60 languages are spoken by the student body. In total, 52 percent of the district’s students are white and 48 percent are students of color. Approximately half of the district's students qualify for free or reduced-price school meals. In 2021, the district received a $25,000 grant from the Barr Foundation to recruit a more diverse staff.

== List of schools ==
Superintendent of Schools: Ryan Scallon

=== Elementary schools (K-5) ===
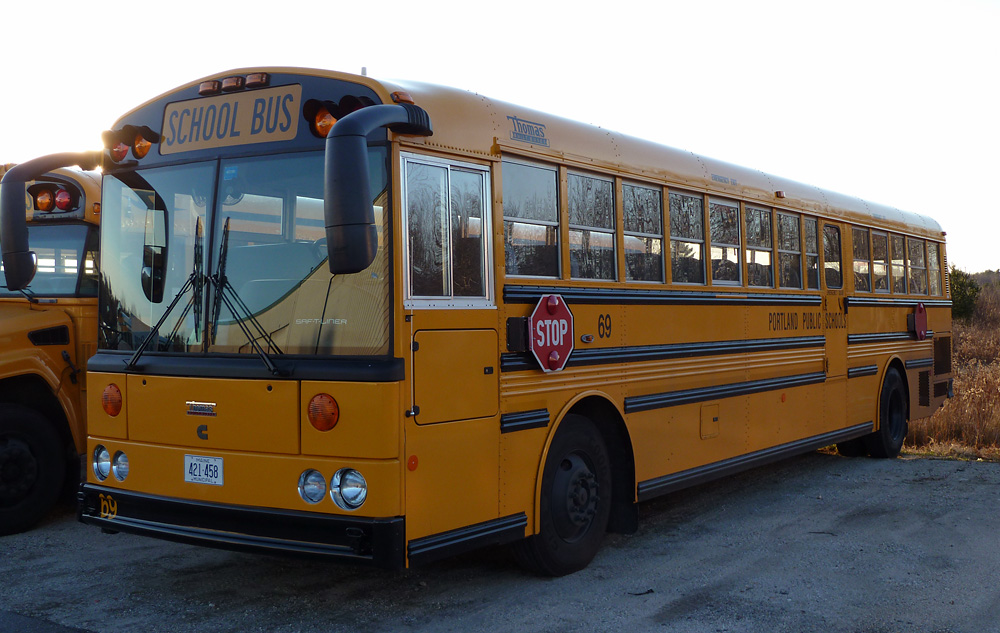
A Portland school bus.

- Amanda C. Rowe Elementary School
- Cliff Island School
- East End Community School
- Henry W. Longfellow Elementary School
- Harrison Lyseth Elementary School
- Ocean Avenue Elementary School
- Peaks Island School
- Presumpscot Elementary School
- Howard C. Reiche Community School
- Gerald E. Talbot Community School

=== Middle schools (6–8) ===
- King Middle School
- Lincoln Middle School
- Lyman Moore Middle School

=== High schools (9–12) ===
- Casco Bay High School (opened 2005)
- Deering High School (opened 1874)
- Portland Arts and Technology High School (PATHS) (opened 1976)
- Portland High School, (opened 1821)

=== Former schools ===
- Baxter Elementary School, 150 Ocean Avenue (closed in 2003)
- Butler School, Pine Street (1879-1973)
- Casco Street School
- Chapman School, Brighton Avenue
- Cummings School, 587 Ocean Avenue (closed in 1979)
- Emerson School, 13 Emerson Street (1898-1979)
- Fred P. Hall Elementary School
- Heseltine School, (1867-?)
- Jack Elementary School, North Street (1943-2001)
- Jackson School, 40 Forest Avenue ()
- Long Island School
- Marada Adams School, Vesper Street (1958-2006)
- McLellan School, Carroll Street (1886-1982)
- Monument Street School, Monunment Street
- Morrill's Corner School (1903-?)
- Nathan Clifford School, 180 Falmouth Street (1909-2011)
- North School, 248–264 Congress Street (1867-1979)
- Oakdale School, Pitt Street (1887-1965)
- Peary School, Florida Avenue (1930-1976)
- Roosevelt School, Stevens Avenue (1919-1986)
- Rosa True School, 140 Park Street (1844-1972)
- Shailer School, 56 North Street (1881-1979)
- Sherman Street Kindergareten, Sherman Street (built in 1941)
- Staples School, Center Street (1885-1971)
- Thomas B. Reed School, Homestead Avenue (1926-2013)
- Vaughan Street School, Vaughan Street
- Walker Manual Training School, Casco Street (1901-1984)
- West School, Lowell Street (1962-2015)
- Woolson Street School, (1852-1974)

== Food service ==
The Portland Public Schools prepare food at a central kitchen. The school department provides hot lunches for about 2,200 elementary students per day. In 2011, the Portland Public Schools added a daily vegetarian cold lunch option to its school menus. In 2019, the district changed to a daily hot vegan school meal option. The food service director said the vegan options were added to serve the schools' diverse student body.
