= Portland Arts and Technology High School =

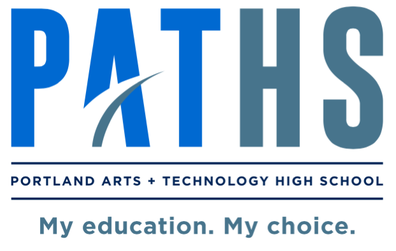

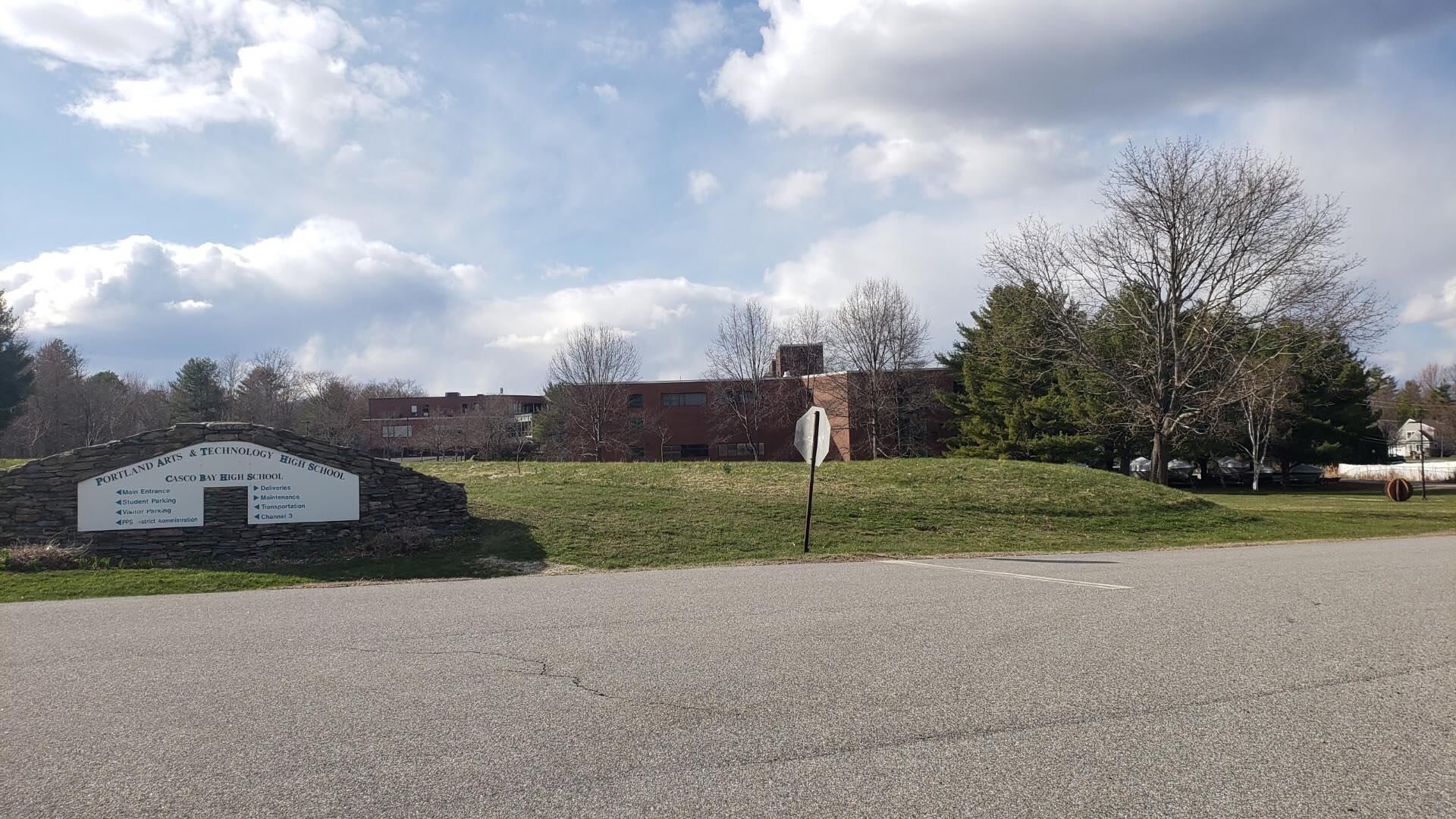

Location
- 196 Allen Avenue; Portland, Maine 04103; United States; 43°42′01″N 70°17′39″W

Information
- Other name: PATHS
- Former name: Portland Regional; Vocational High School
- Type: Public vocational school
- Established: 1976
- School district: Portland Public Schools
- NCES School ID: 230993000130
- Director: Kevin Stilphen
- Teaching staff: 19.00 (on an FTE basis)
- Grades: 11–12
- Website: paths.portlandschools.org

Portland Arts and Technology High School (PATHS, formerly Portland Regional Vocational High School) is a public vocational school in Portland, Maine, United States. It was established in 1976 and adopted its present name in the 1990s to reflect its expansion into the arts. It is part of the Portland Public Schools district.

PATHS is not a full time high school in its own right; students still attend half of the school day at their sending high school taking core curriculum. It offers career and technical education, encompassing eighteen programs, to students from fourteen secondary schools within the Greater Portland area. It shares its building with Casco Bay High School.

== Curriculum ==
=== Programs ===
Portland Arts and Technology High School offers programs in eighteen areas as of the 2019-2020 academic year. These programs include automotive collisions, automotive technology, biomedical and health sciences, carpentry, commercial art, culinary concepts, dance, early childhood occupations, foodservice, landscapes and gardens, manufacturing technology, marine systems, new media, plumbing and heating technology, welding technology and blacksmithing, and woodworking.

=== Certifications ===
Students at the school attend their home high school to complete their high school diploma. The school provides nationally accredited certifications as well as college credit to students who successfully complete a program.
