= King Middle School (Portland, Maine) =

Coordinates: 43°39′27″N 70°16′29″W

Helen M. King Middle School
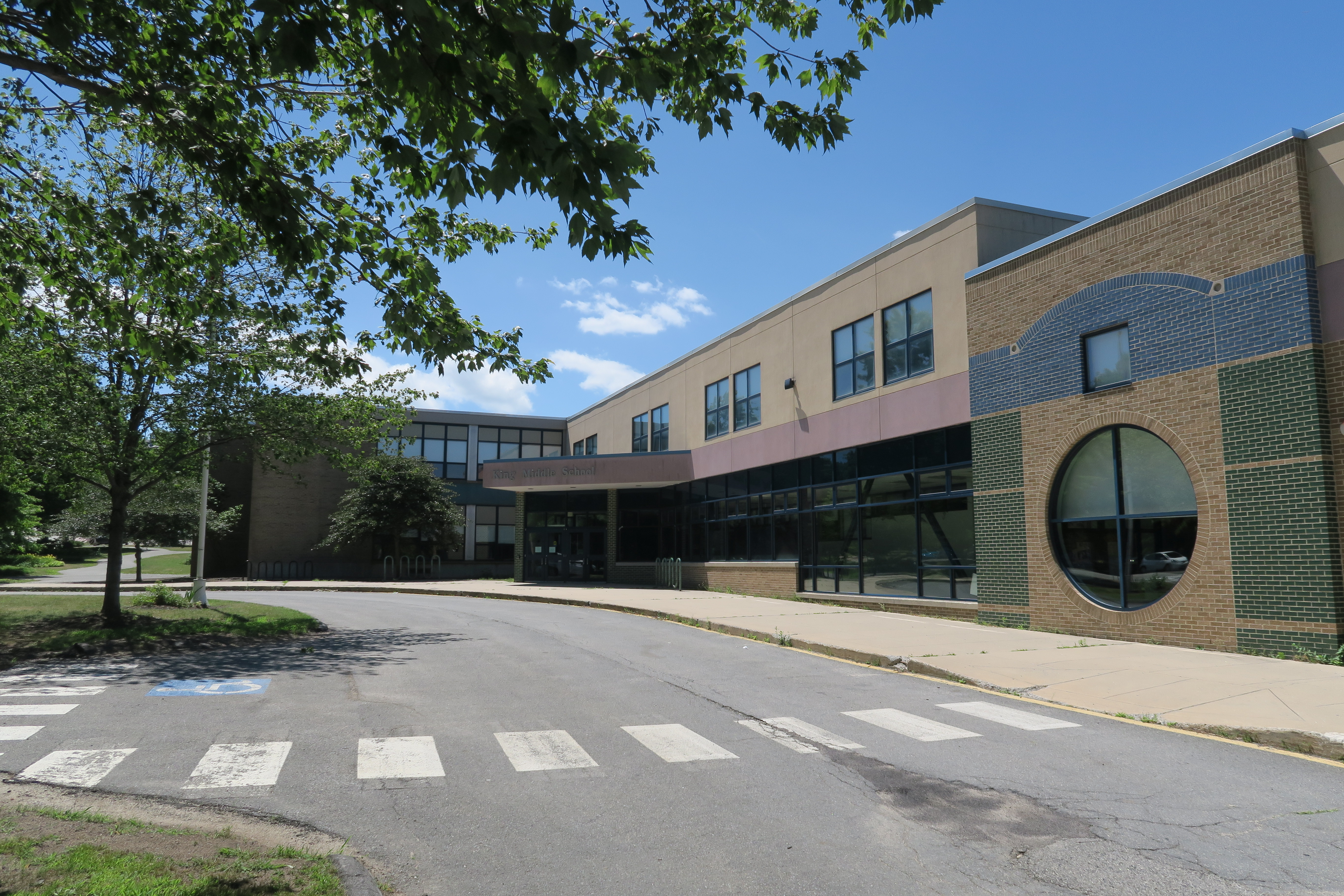

Location
- 92 Deering Ave, Portland, ME 04102; Portland, Maine

Helen M. King Middle School is an expeditionary learning public middle school located in Portland, Maine and administered by the Portland Public Schools. The school's current principal is Amy Marx. It is cited as one of the most racially diverse in the state of Maine: the student body totals 550, represents 22 countries and 29 languages. The school teaches from sixth to eighth grade and has 55 teachers. The school operates without a bell system and emphasizes flexibility.

In 2007, King became the first middle school in the United States to offer birth control pills to 7th- and 8th-grade students. The pills are offered with parents' permission, and the policy was enacted following a spate of pregnancies at the school. The Portland School Committee voted 7–2 to enact the policy.

In 2010, Secretary of Education Arne Duncan visited and toured the school, calling it "innovative" for being able to set high expectations for its culturally and economically diverse students and for its use of expeditionary learning.

In May 2013, King Middle School was profiled by PBS NewsHour for an "unusually comprehensive science curriculum that emphasizes problem-solving".

In 2015, Hillary Clinton made an appearance at the school to promote her presidential campaign.
