= Expeditionary learning schools =

Expeditionary Learning Schools (ELS) are models of comprehensive school reform based on the educational ideas of German educator Kurt Hahn, the founder of Outward Bound. There are more than 150 Expeditionary Learning Schools in 30 US states and the District of Columbia. They feature project-based learning expeditions, where students engage in interdisciplinary study of compelling topics, in groups and in their community, with assessment coming through cumulative products, public presentations, and portfolios. According to the ELS website students undertake tasks requiring perseverance, fitness, craftsmanship, imagination, self-discipline, and significant achievement.

== Design principles ==
According to the ELS website, the following design principles serve as a moral and cultural foundation for each Expeditionary Learning School. They express the core values and educational philosophy of Expeditionary Learning.

- The Primacy of Self-Discovery states that learning happens best with emotion, challenge, and the requisite support. People discover their abilities, values, passions, and responsibilities in situations that offer adventure and the unexpected. The primary task of the teacher is to help students overcome their fears and discover they can do more than they thought they could.
- The Having of Wonderful Ideas places emphasis on fostering curiosity about the world by creating learning situations that provide something important to think about, time to experiment, and time to make sense of what is observed.
- The Responsibility for Learning argues that learning is both a personal process of discovery and a social activity. Therefore, every aspect of an Expeditionary Learning school encourages both children and adults to become increasingly responsible for directing their own personal and collective learning.
- Empathy and Caring believes that learning is fostered best in communities where students' and teachers' ideas are respected and where there is mutual trust. Older students often mentor younger ones, and students feel physically and emotionally safe.
- Success and Failure states the fact that all students need to be successful if they are to build the confidence and capacity to take risks and meet increasingly difficult challenges. However, it is also important for students to learn from their failures, persevere when things are hard, and learn to turn disabilities into opportunities.
- Collaboration and Competition positions Expeditionary Learning schools as integrating individual development and group development, so that the value of friendship, trust, and group action is clear. Students are encouraged to compete not against each other, but with their own personal best and with rigorous standards of excellence.
- Diversity and Inclusion believes that both diversity and inclusion increase the richness of ideas, creative power, problem-solving ability, and respect for others. Schools and learning groups are heterogeneous.
- The Natural World helps create a direct and respectful relationship with the natural world, which refreshes the human spirit and teaches the important ideas of recurring cycles and cause and effect. Students learn to become stewards of the earth and of future generations.
- Solitude and Reflection argues that students and teachers need time alone to explore their own thoughts, make their own connections, and create their own ideas. They also need time to exchange their reflections with other students and with adults.
- Service and Compassion places emphasis on strengthening students and teachers through acts of consequential service to others. One of an Expeditionary Learning school's primary functions is to prepare students with the attitudes and skills to learn from and be of service.

== Expeditionary Learning Schools Outward Bound ==
The organization Expeditionary Learning (EL) is the primary organization working with schools to design and implement their programs. EL provides schools with curricular and instructional frameworks, along with strategies to change the culture of school communities. EL develops new schools and helps existing ones transition, entering into multi-year contracts with schools and school districts.

== History ==
In 1992, Outward Bound's Expeditionary Learning proposal was one of 11 selected for funding from almost 800 solicited by the New American Schools Development Corporation (NASDC) for comprehensive school reform (citation: ELS website). ELS was launched in 1993 with 10 demonstration schools in five US cities: New York City; Boston; Portland, ME; Denver; and Dubuque, IA.

== Results ==
The Rand Corporation, The American Institutes for Research, The National Staff Development Council, and The Center for Research on the Education of Students Placed At Risk (CRESPAR) have all evaluated ELS models and practices and cite positive outcomes such as higher student achievement, participation, and a more positive and productive school culture. The 2002 CRESPAR analysis of 29 comprehensive school reform models awarded ELS the highest rating given to any model created in the previous ten years. In February 2009, President Barack Obama visited Capital City Public Charter School, an Expeditionary Learning School in Washington, DC, and said the school "is an example of how all our schools should be."

== See also ==
- The Kurt Hahn Expeditionary Learning School
- Outward Bound USA
