= West End (Portland, Maine) =

Neighborhood in Portland, Maine

Coordinates: 43.6506°N 70.2745°W

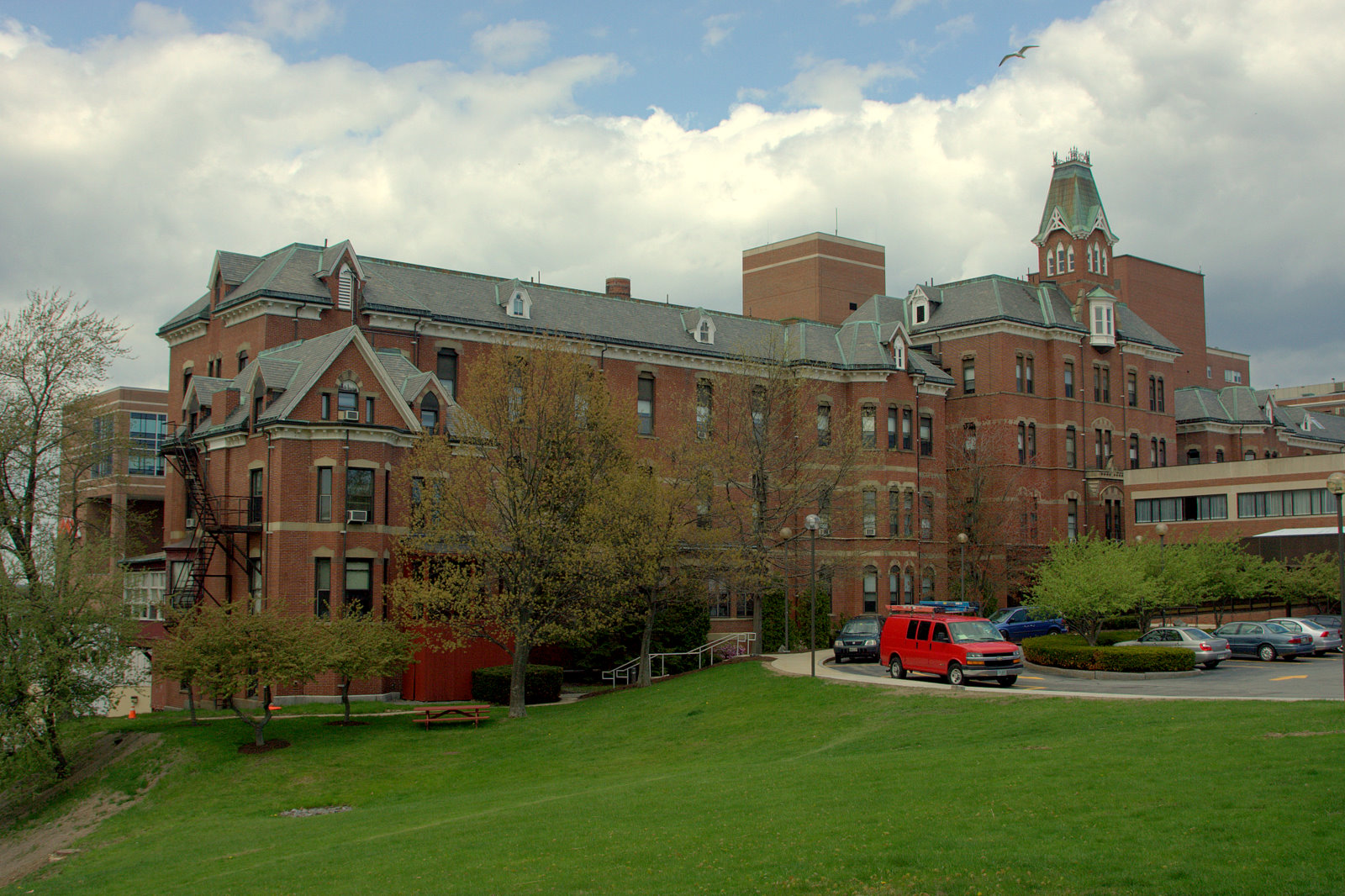
Maine Medical Center, Maine's largest hospital, is located on the Western Promenade.

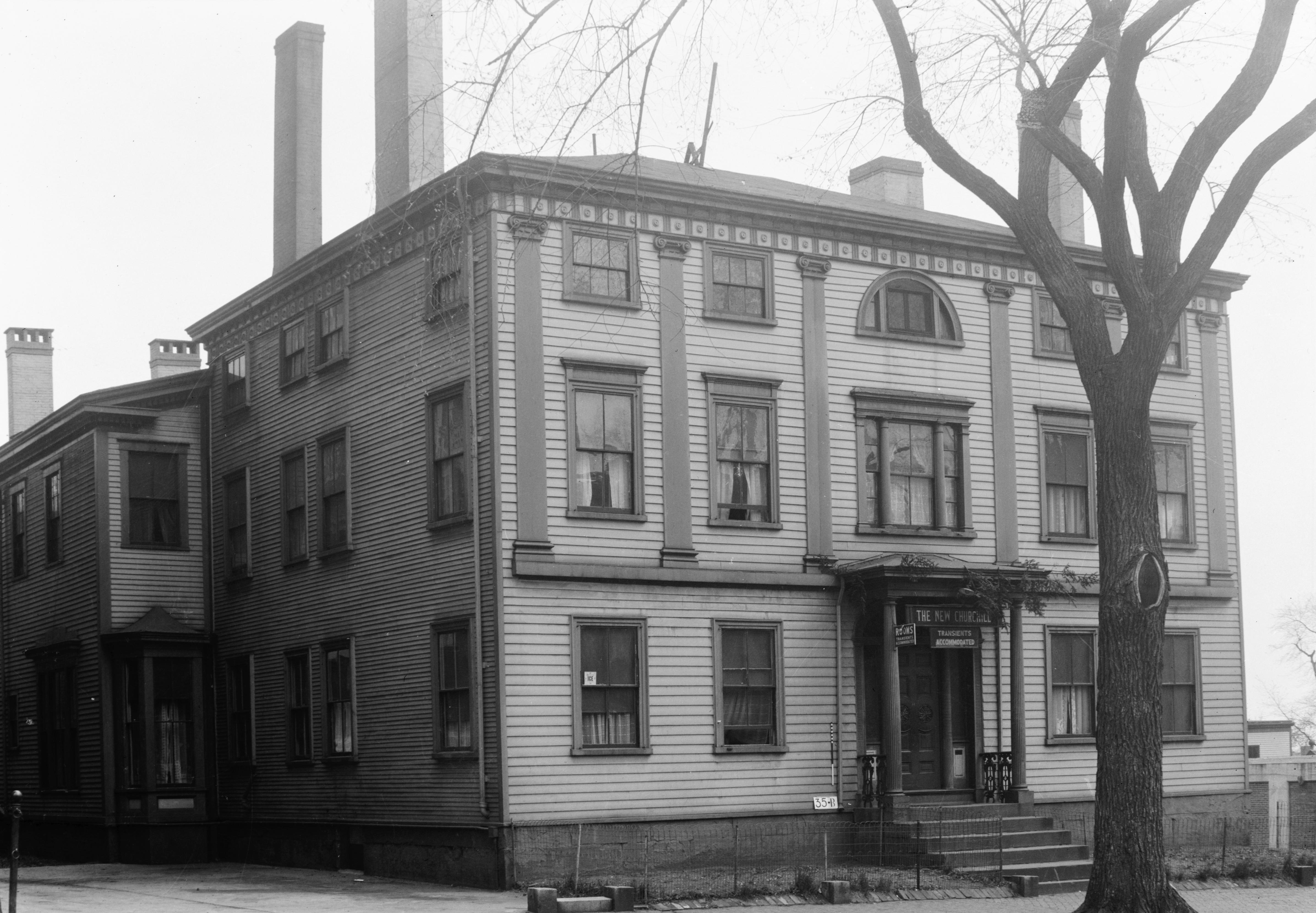
The Joseph Holy Ingraham House on State Street.

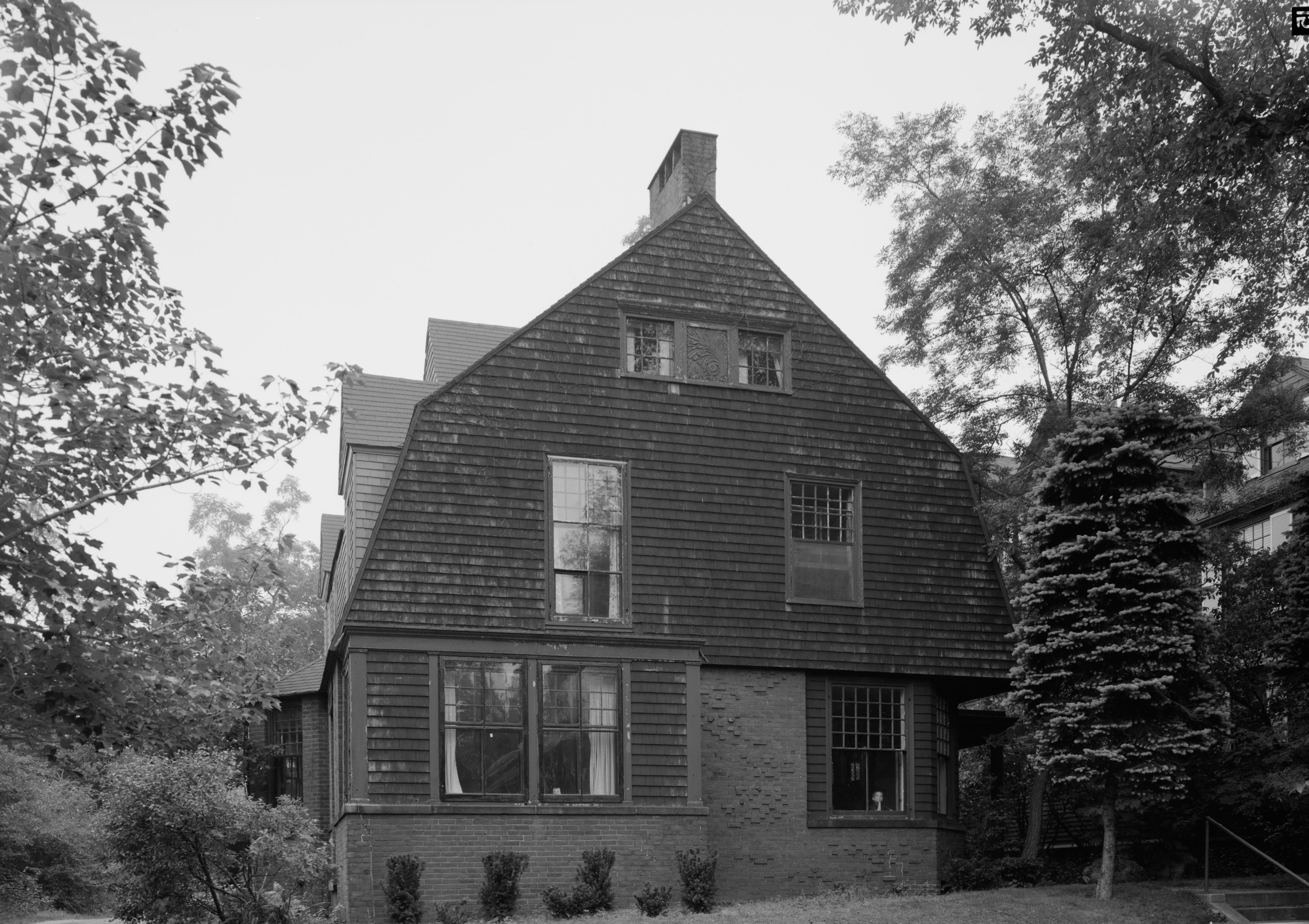
The John Calvin Stevens House on Bowdoin Street near the Western Promenade.

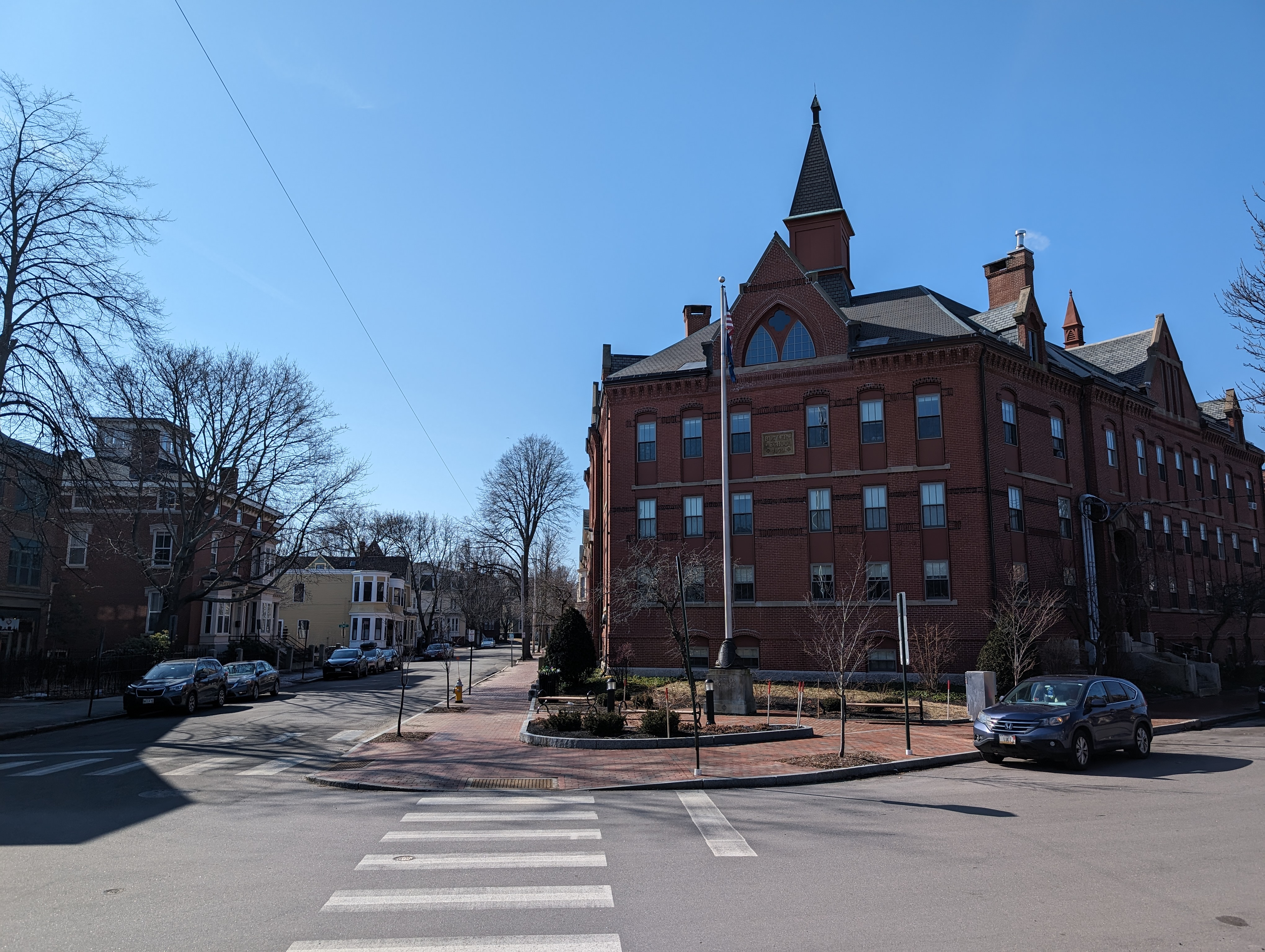
Andrews Square.

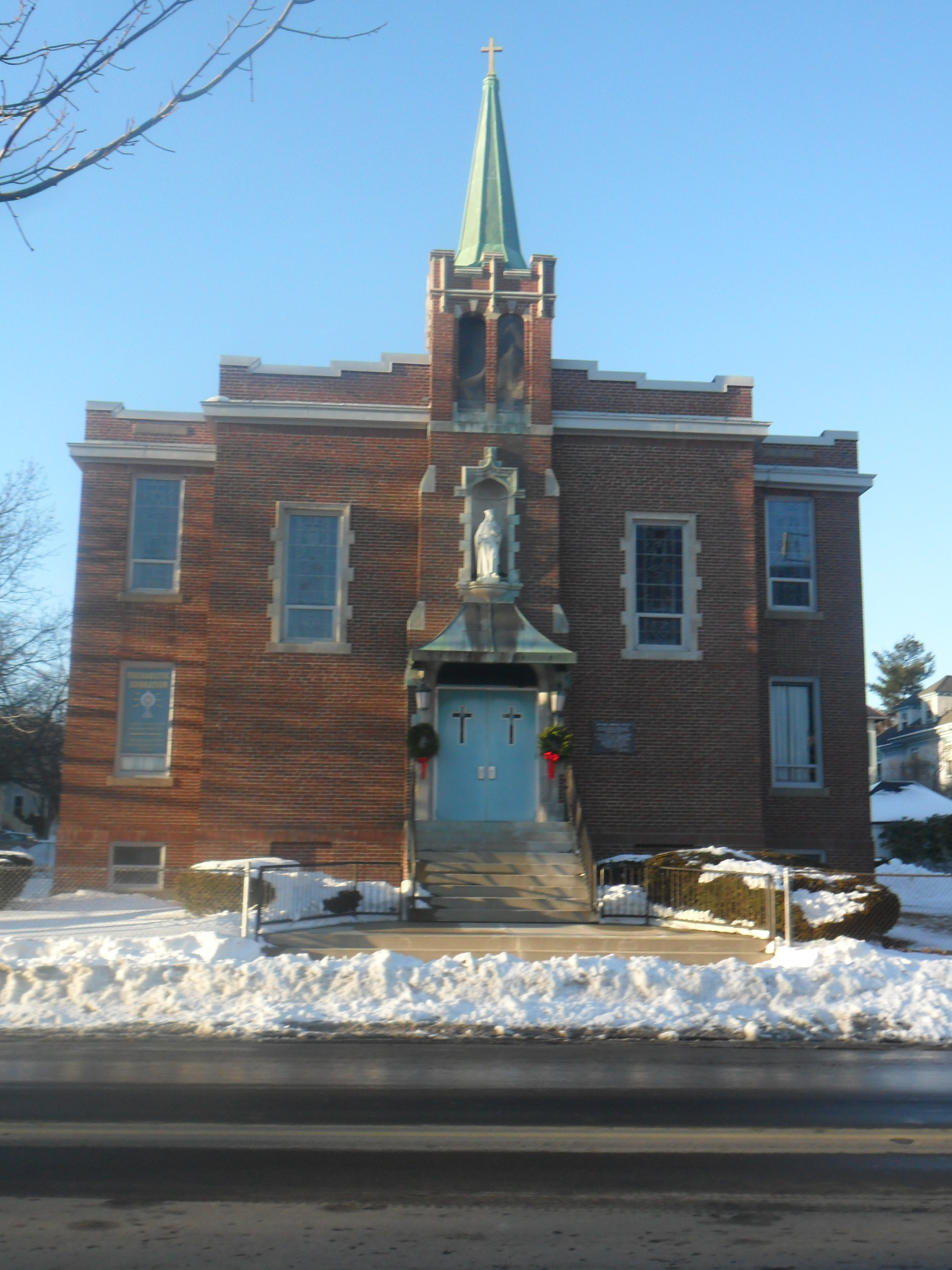
The St. Louis. Parish on Danforth Street is an historically Polish congregation.

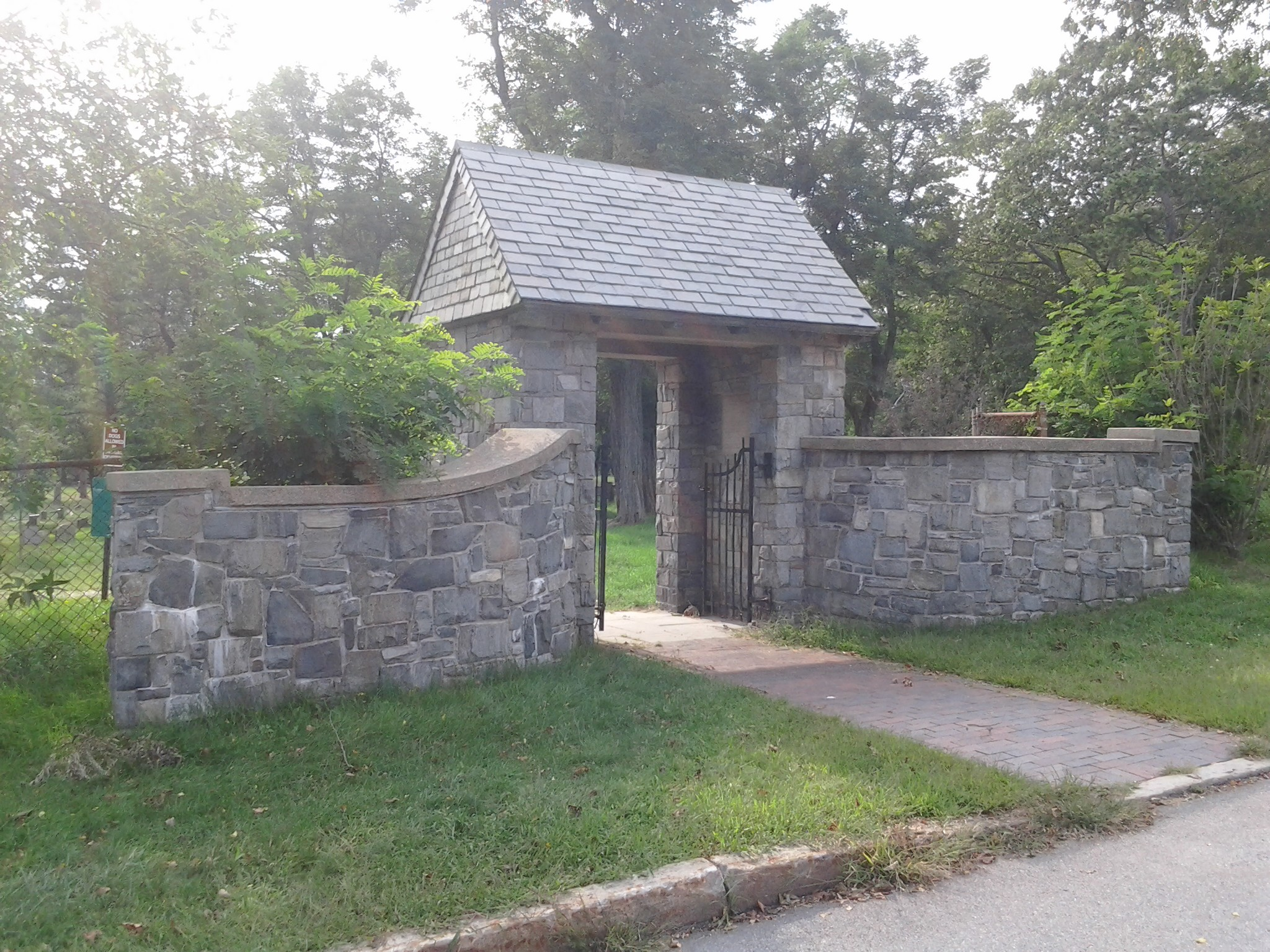
The Western Cemetery covers much of the southwestern area of the West End.

The West End is a downtown neighborhood in Portland, Maine. It is located on the western side of Portland's peninsula primarily on Bramhall Hill and is noted for its architecture and history. The neighborhood is home to many late 19th- and early 20th-century homes and, in 2010, it was called "one of the best preserved Victorian neighborhoods in the country". The Western Promenade, a park laid out in 1836, overlooks the forests and small settlements of Southwestern Maine, along with the distant White Mountains. Other historic structures include 68 High Street, The Gothic House, Brown House, Butler House, Ingraham House, Morrill Mansion and the Minott House.

The neighborhood is known for ethnic and socioeconomic diversity; in 1994, it was called one of Portland's 'gay-friendly' neighborhoods.

== Education ==
Howard C. Reiche Community School, a public school located on Brackett Street, serves the West End's K-5 school-age students. It also houses a branch library, swimming pool, and community center. Waynflete School, a private school located on Spring Street, is also located in the neighborhood. Learning Works, formally known as Portland West, is located on Brackett Street in the West End. Founded as a community group fighting the gentrification of the West End in 1967, Learning Works is now a social services agency which provides educational opportunities to at-risk teenagers, immigrants, refugees and low income families.

=== Former schools ===
- Butler Grammar School (West and Pine Street): opened in 1879, closed in 1973.
- Rosa True School 140 Park Street: Opened in 1844, closed in 1972
- Vaughn Street School (233 Vaughn Street)
- St. Dominic's Grammar School (State and Gray). Opened in late 1800s/early 1900s. Closed in early 1970s.

== Healthcare ==
Mercy Hospital was established in 1918 by the Roman Catholic Diocese of Portland and the Sisters of Mercy. Maine Medical Center, Maine's largest hospital and Portland's largest employer, is located on the Western Promenade. It was founded in 1874.

== Media ==
The West End News is a local weekly newspaper which includes news and information pertaining to the neighborhood and the city at-large. Founded and published by Ed King 2001–2012.

== Reservoir ==
In 1869, the Bramhall Reservoir gate and fence was built around Brackett, Vaughan and Chadwick Streets, to hold water pumped from Sebago Lake by the Portland Water Company. It held 8 million gallons. The reservoir was used until 1964, when it was flattened and the land was leased to nearby Maine Medical Center for parking.

== Parks, cemeteries, and stadiums ==
Five city parks are located in the neighborhood, including Clark Street Park, Harbor View Park, Tate-Tyng Playground and McIntyre Park, and the Western Promenade with a view of the White Mountains in New Hampshire. The Western Cemetery, Portland's primary cemetery from 1829 to 1852, is located in the neighborhood.

McIntyre Park on Taylor Street was redeveloped beginning in October 2011. Funded by a grant from the Department of Housing and Urban Development at a cost of $83,000, the park upgraded its basketball court, seating area, swings and other playground equipment.

On August 4, 2026, the USL League One soccer team Portland Hearts of Pine announced that it had purchased land on Cassidy Point in the West End with the intention of building a stadium for both the men's and women's team. The club estimated that it would cost $50 million to build, and projected that the stadium would be ready for the 2029 season.

== Notable residents ==
- Thaddeus Clark, namesake of Clark Street
- Philip J. Deering, businessperson, mayor and state representative (lived at 100 Vaughan Street)
- John Eder, state representative
- Francis H. Fassett, architect
- Jon Hinck, state representative
- Dr. William MacVane
- John Neal, writer, critic, editor, lecturer, and activist
- James V. Oliver, state representative
- Roxanne Quimby, co-founder of Burt's Bees
- Michael V. Saxl, state representative
- John Calvin Stevens, architect
- Ethan Strimling, mayor

== See also ==
- Lafayette Hotel
- Spring Street Historic District
- Western Promenade Historic District
