= Portland High School (Maine) =

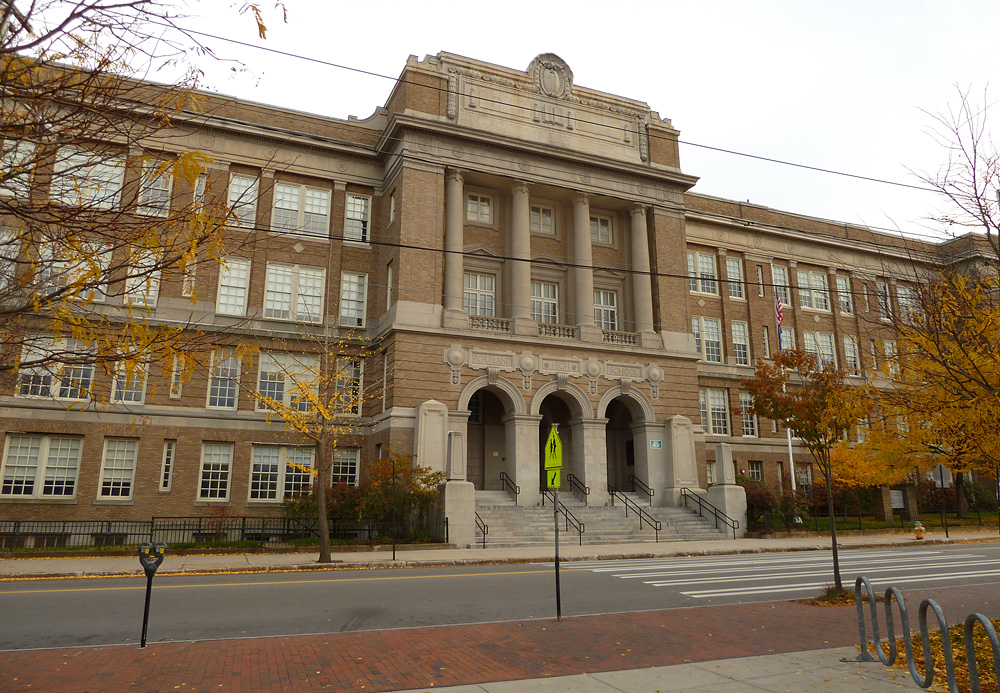

Location
- 284 Cumberland Avenue; Portland, Maine; United States

Information
- Type: Public secondary
- Established: 1821 (205 years ago)
- School district: Portland Public Schools
- Principal: Sarah Obare
- Faculty: 75+
- Teaching staff: 68.80 (FTE)
- Grades: 9–12
- Enrollment: 968 (2023-2024)
- Student to teacher ratio: 14.07
- Campus: Urban
- Colors: Blue and White
- Mascot: Bulldog
- Rivals: Deering High School; South Portland High School; Thornton Academy
- Accreditation: New England Association of Schools and Colleges
- Newspaper: Bulldog Edition
- Yearbook: Totem
- Website: phs.portlandschools.org
- Portland High School
- U.S. National Register of Historic Places
- Location within Maine Location within the United States
- Location: 284 Cumberland Ave., Portland, Maine
- Coordinates: 43°39′33″N 70°15′32″W
- Area: 1 acre (0.4 ha)
- Built: 1863
- Architect: Harding, George M.; Multiple
- Architectural style: Classical Revival, Italianate
- NRHP reference No.: 84003879
- Added to NRHP: November 23, 1984

Portland High School is a public high school established in 1821 in Portland, Maine, United States, which educates grades 9–12. The school is part of the Portland Public Schools district, and is one of three high schools in that district, along with Deering High School and Casco Bay High School. It is located at 284 Cumberland Avenue in downtown Portland. Along with its sister school, Deering High School, a family can choose which of the two to send their students to, while Casco Bay admits using a lottery system.

== History ==
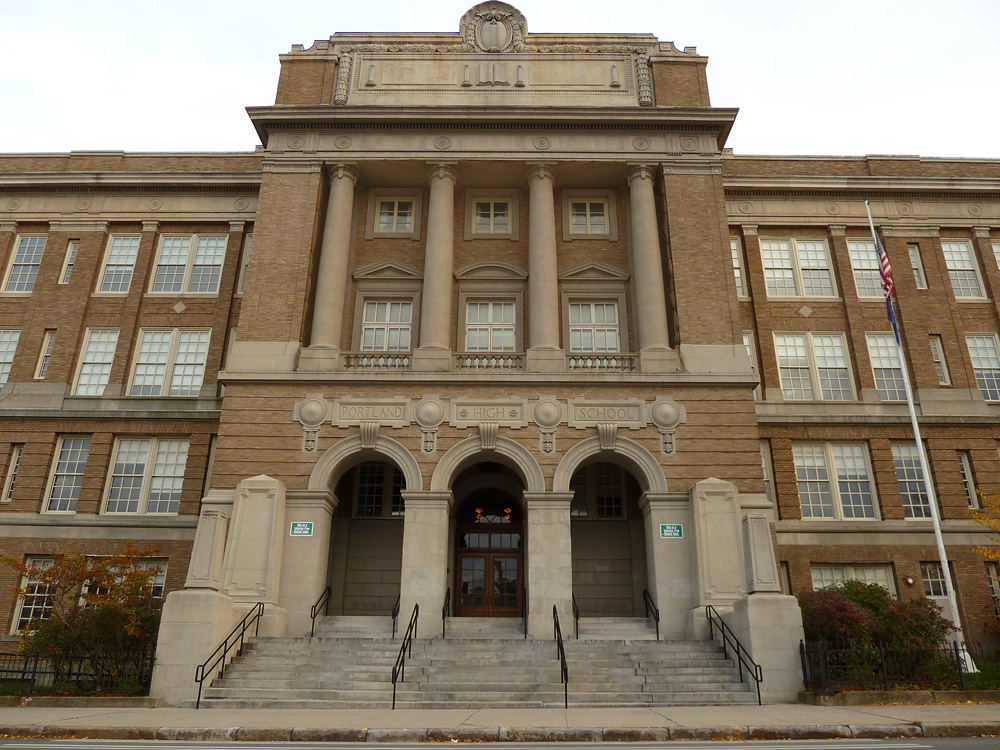
The entrance to Portland High School.

Established on Exchange Street in 1821, originally as a boys' school, Portland High School is one of the oldest high schools in the United States. Joseph Libbey was its first principal. A separate school for girls was added in 1850, and in 1863 the school moved to Cumberland Avenue, its present location. The original school building on that site, which is now the middle wing of the modern school, was originally divided into two by a brick wall running from top to bottom of the building to divide the girls from the boys. Much of the wall has been removed, but its remains can still be seen in the basement.

The main school was constructed between 1915 and 1918, according to the plaque by the front entrance. On February 15, 1919 the new Portland High School along Cumberland Avenue, opened. It was designed by Miller & Mayo. The new school had a lecture hall and mechanical arts classrooms. It also had two kitchen classrooms, three sewing rooms and two classrooms for typing. The school was added to the National Register of Historic Places on November 23, 1984.

In 1989 a new annex was opened containing more classrooms, a cafeteria, a theater/auditorium (named for John Ford) and an athletic facility.

Approximately 700-1000 students are enrolled each year. In June 2010, 174 students graduated from Portland High School.

== Sports ==
Portland High School uses the off-campus Fitzpatrick Stadium, Hadlock Field, Portland Expo, and William B. Troubh Ice Arena for the school's sporting events.

The Deering High School and Portland High School football teams have played each other each Thanksgiving since 1911, except for 1920 and 2020.

== Notable alumni ==
- Wyatt Allen, Olympic gold and bronze medalist in rowing
- Reginald Bartholomew, diplomat
- James Phinney Baxter III, faculty member at Colorado College and Harvard, won the 1947 Pulitzer Prize for History for his book Scientists Against Time
- David Brenerman, politician
- Paul Franklin Clark (1882–1983), bacteriologist and virologist
- W. Edward Crockett, state legislator
- John Ford (then known as John Martin Feeney), film director and producer
- Robert Hale, U.S. Congressman
- Charles Badger Hall, US Army major general
- Gail Laughlin, first woman from Maine to practice law and founder of the National League for Women's Service
- Dave Littlefield, former Major League Baseball executive, Senior Vice President and General Manager of the Pittsburgh Pirates
- Josh Longstaff, NBA assistant basketball coach
- Ted Lowry, heavyweight boxer
- John Lynch, U.S. Representative
- Admiral Robert E. Peary, explorer, first to claim to reach the North Pole
- Quinton Porter, professional NFL football player
- Thomas B. Reed, Speaker of the United States House of Representatives
- Lois Rice, corporate executive, scholar and education policy expert
- George Thompson Ruby, first Black graduate of Portland High School and a prominent black Republican leader in Reconstruction-era Texas
- John Calvin Stevens, architect, pioneer of Shingle Style

== See also ==
- Education in Maine
- National Register of Historic Places listings in Portland, Maine
