= Alfond =

Alfond is a surname. Notable people with the surname include:

- Bill Alfond (born 1949), American investor, philanthropist, and billionaire
- Harold Alfond (1914–2007), American businessman
- Justin Alfond (born 1975), American politician
- Peter Alfond (1952–2017), American investor, philanthropist, and billionaire
- Susan Alfond (born 1946), American investor, philanthropist, and billionaire
- Ted Alfond (born 1945), American investor, philanthropist, and billionaire

== See also ==
- Alfond Stadium (disambiguation)
