= Westbrook College Historic District =

Historic district in Maine, United States

- U.S. National Register of Historic Places
- U.S. Historic district
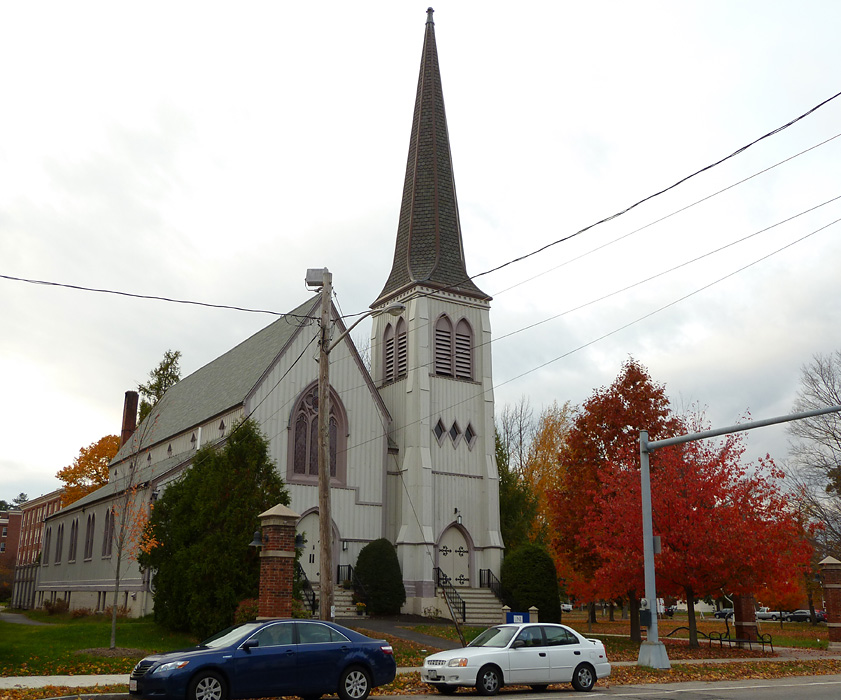
- Ludcke Auditorium, formerly the Universalist Church (1867), on Stevens Avenue

- Location within Maine Location within the United States
- Location: 716 Stevens Ave. (campus of the University of New England), Portland, Maine
- Coordinates: 43°41′0″N 70°17′45″W
- Area: 6 acres (2.4 ha)
- Built: 1831
- Architectural style: Colonial Revival, Mixed
- NRHP reference No.: 77000066
- Added to NRHP: September 15, 1977

The Westbrook College Historic District is a historic district in the Deering neighborhood of Portland, Maine. It is centered on the campus of the former Westbrook College, founded in 1831 as the nation's first coeducational boarding school. The college merged with the University of New England in 1996. The district, which includes six buildings constructed between 1833 and 1952, was added to the National Register of Historic Places in 1977.

== History ==
Westbrook Seminary was chartered in 1831, and opened its doors in 1834. Founded by Universalists, it was always a non-sectarian coeducational boarding school. The place where it is located was originally part of the city of Westbrook, was later split off as Deering, and was then later annexed to Portland. The school changed its name to Westbrook Junior College in 1933, and Westbrook College in 1974. In 1996 the school merged with the University of New England in Biddeford, and began operating, under its 1831 charter, with the UNE name at both campuses.

The Westbrook College Historic District encompasses the historic core of the Westbrook College campus. It is bounded on the east by Stevens Avenue, and on the north by College Avenue; the latter is part of the circulation road of the campus. To the south of College Avenue is the campus's main quadrangle, which is lined to its south and west by historic buildings. They are described below, organized in a clockwise direction beginning at Stevens Avenue.

Ludcke Auditorium is a wood frame Gothic Revival building, constructed in 1867 as a Universalist church to a design by Portland architect Francis H. Fassett. The building served as the Westbrook College Library in the 20th century. Goddard Hall and Hersey Hall, which stand west of (behind) Ludcke Auditorium, are both four-story Italianate brick buildings built in 1857 and 1869, respectively. Now connected to the western end of Hersey Hall is Proctor Hall, a 1952 Colonial Revival brick building. North of Proctor stands Alumni Hall, which is the original 1833 Westbrook Seminary building. Just to its north is the former MacArthur Gymnasium, a 1900 Colonial Revival building designed by Fassett and his son Edward. MacArthur was adapted as part of UNE's Abplanalp Library, which includes a modern wing to the rear, by which it is joined to Alumni Hall.

== See also ==
- National Register of Historic Places listings in Portland, Maine
