= James D. Herbert (psychologist) =

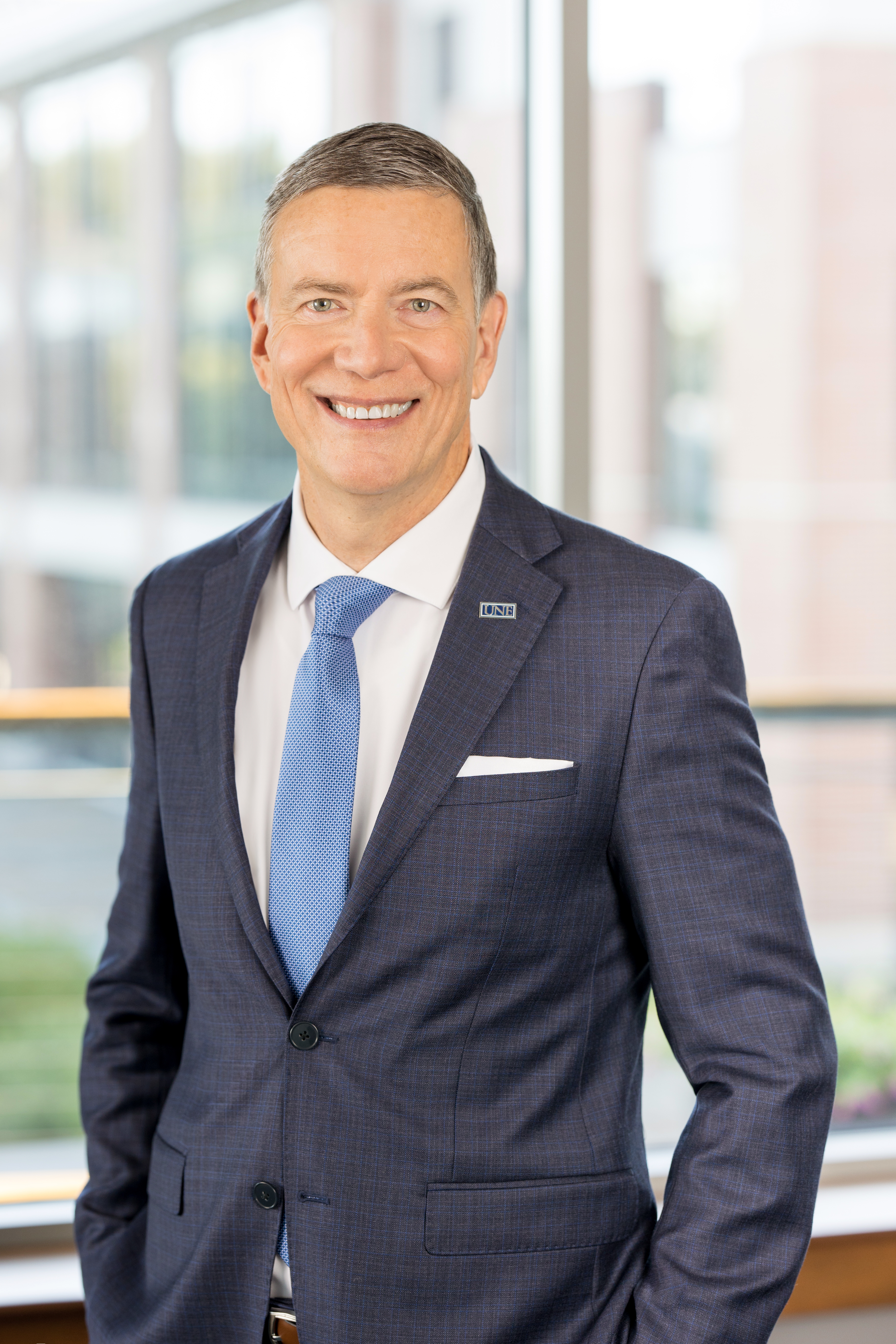

Sixth President of the University of New England
- Incumbent
- Assumed office July 2017
- Preceded by: Danielle N. Ripich

Personal details
- Born: June 20, 1962 (age 64)
- Spouse(s): Lynn Brandsma, PhD
- Children: 4
- Education: University of Texas at Austin (BA), University of North Carolina at Greensboro (MA/PhD)
- Awards: 2025 Business Leader of the Year, Mainebiz

James D. Herbert (born June 20, 1962) is a psychologist, professor, and university administrator. On July 1, 2017, he became the sixth president of the University of New England.

== Early life and education ==
Herbert grew up on the Gulf Coast of Texas. He earned a bachelor's degree in psychology from the University of Texas at Austin and a master's degree and doctorate in clinical psychology from the University of North Carolina at Greensboro. He completed a predoctoral fellowship at Beth Israel Medical Center in New York City.

== Professional career ==
Prior to becoming president of the University of New England, Herbert served as executive vice provost and inaugural dean of the Graduate College at Drexel University. He previously served in faculty roles at Hahnemann University and the Medical College of Pennsylvania.

On February 21, 2017, the University of New England announced that Herbert had been selected to become its next president succeeding Danielle N. Ripich. He assumed the duties of the presidency on July 1, 2017, and was formally inaugurated at a ceremony at the university's Biddeford Campus on September 9, 2017.

== Presidency at UNE ==
During Herbert's tenure as president, UNE has undertaken significant institutional expansion and received improved financial ratings.

In 2020, UNE received a $30 million gift from the Harold Alfond Foundation, the largest gift in the university's history at the time. The gift supported the construction of the Harold and Bibby Alfond Center for Health Sciences, which opened in June 2025 on UNE's Portland campus. The 110,000-square-foot facility relocated the university's College of Osteopathic Medicine from Biddeford to Portland, consolidating UNE's health professions programs on a single campus and allowing the medical school to increase enrollment by 21%.

In 2023, Moody's Investors Service elevated UNE's credit rating from A3 to A2 with a stable financial outlook, citing "excellent operating performance and diverse academic offerings." Fitch Ratings upgraded the university's financial outlook from "stable" to "positive" in 2023, making UNE the only institution in New England to receive such a revision that year.

In 2023, UNE established a College of Business, and the college has since expanded to include degree programs in accounting, finance, marketing, and outdoor business innovation.

Herbert founded "The President's Forum" in 2018, a biannual discussion series designed to promote viewpoint diversity and civil discourse on controversial topics. Herbert was named 2025 Business Leader of the Year by Mainebiz. His contribution to UNE's substantial growth in academic and research programs allowed him to reach the top 10 list.

== Scholarship and Affiliations ==
Herbert is known for his work on quackery and pseudoscience in mental health, as well as on behavioral treatments for anxiety disorders. He has authored more than 170 scholarly works on these and other topics. His 2011 book Acceptance and Mindfulness in Cognitive Behavior Therapy was endorsed by the Dalai Lama.

Herbert is a fellow of the Institute for Science in Medicine, the Association for Contextual Behavioral Science, the Association for Behavioral and Cognitive Therapies, the Academy of Cognitive Therapy, and the Commission for Scientific Medicine and Mental Health.
