= History of the Jews in Maine =

Jews have been living in Maine, a state in the northeastern United States, for 200 years, with significant Jewish communities in Bangor as early as the 1840s and in Portland since the 1880s. The arrival of Susman Abrams in 1785 was followed by a history of immigration and settlement that parallels the history of Jewish immigration to the United States.

The first recorded Jew in Maine was Susman Abrams, who arrived in the area in 1785. Abrams, originally from Hamburg, Germany, first settled in the town of Waldoboro and worked as a peddler. Abrams would later move to Thomaston and then Union, where he opened a tannery. In 1810, he married widow Mary Jones of the town of Friendship, a Christian. Abrams died on October 6, 1830, at about 87 years old.

Small Jewish communities began forming across the state, with German Jews settling in Bangor by 1829. The Jewish community in the city of Bangor would be the first to found a synagogue when they founded Congregation Ahawas Achim in 1849. Ahawas Achim would close seven years later, and its members left the state for other Jewish communities.

In 2012, the Jewish population in Maine was nearly 14,000 and spread out over several communities.

Historical population
Year	Pop.	±%
1908	5,000	—
1955	7,500	+50.0%
1965	8,285	+10.5%
1971	7,259	−12.4%
1975	7,945	+9.5%
1985	9,350	+17.7%
1995	7,500	−19.8%
2005	10,315	+37.5%
2011	13,900	+34.8%
2015	13,890	−0.1%
2019	22,600	+62.7%

== Auburn-Lewiston ==
The first Jewish residents came to the Lewiston-Auburn area around 1865 and were largely merchants. It wouldn't be until the 1920s when the area would receive its first formal places of Jewish worship: Beth Jacob Synagogue in Lewiston and Beth Abraham Synagogue in Auburn. Prior to these congregations a more informal place of prayer and religious education called a shul, a Yiddish word derived from the German word for school, existed to cover the needs of the community. Beth Jacob, located at the corner of Shawmut and Sabattus Street in Lewiston, considered itself Orthodox in its religious practice, but allowed for mixed seating during services. In addition to the two synagogues, the community was served by the Jewish Community Center on College Street in Lewiston. In 1981, the Beth Jacob congregation merged with the Community Center to form a new institution: Temple Shalom Synagogue Center. Temple Shalom is an unaffiliated congregation.

Historical population
Year	Pop.	±%
1865	3	—
1880	38	+1166.7%
1890	120	+215.8%
1900	325	+170.8%
1908	613	+88.6%
1910	745	+21.5%
1920	769	+3.2%
1927	1,300	+69.1%
1930	788	−39.4%
1940	1,475	+87.2%
1955	1,400	−5.1%
1965	1,400	+0.0%
1975	750	−46.4%
1985	500	−33.3%
1995	500	+0.0%
2007	600	+20.0%

=== Population data over the years ===
- First Jewish resident recorded in 1865
- Highest population estimate 1955-1965 : 1400
- Latest population estimate 2007 : 600

=== Current Jewish organizations ===
- Temple Shalom Synagogue Center (Independent)
- Jewish Student Union

=== Major events and milestones ===
==== Early immigrant period (pre-1900) ====
The first Jewish family settled in Lewiston in the mid 19th century. While a synagogue was not built in the area before the turn of the century, early settlers to the area secured a hall in Lewiston to serve as a synagogue. Beth Abraham synagogue was founded in 1898, and Beth Jacob congregation established a cemetery by 1899. Several Jewish families moved to what became known as New Auburn, just across the Androscoggin River, making travel to the Lewiston congregation more difficult.

==== Later immigrant period (1900–1920) ====
By 1902, Beth Abraham Synagogue held services and Hebrew School in a rented building on Second Street, establishing the first synagogue in the Lewiston and Auburn area. That same year, the Beth Abraham Cemetery Association was formed.

Across the river in Lewiston, Beth Jacob leased a hall in 1904 to hold services for their 40 members. By 1907, the congregation was formally organized as Congregation Beth Jacob, and formally incorporated in 1914.

By 1909, both a Young Men's Hebrew Association (YMHA) and Hebrew Aid Society were established, the YMHA even boasting a championship basketball team in 1912.

In 1917, Beth Abraham had outgrown its space, and purchased what had been known as the Union Musical Society Building. However, just six months later, the building was destroyed in a fire.

==== End of WWI to end of WWII (1920–1945) ====
The area's mills continued to develop and prosper. Ways of earning a living diversified. Those who had begun as peddlers were beginning to find greater opportunities in areas such as carbonated beverage manufacturing, shoe manufacturing and furniture sales. Meat markets and grocery stores grew in number, and with the advent of the automobile came the businesses associated with its sales and upkeep. In addition, the area's second generation of Jews entered into the professional fields. Many became teachers while others entered law and medical schools.

By 1925, Beth Jacob Synagogue's construction was complete, and Beth Abraham was rebuilt following the fire in 1918. However, the number of institutions and organizations among the Jewish population of the area were extremely limited. Most existed as extensions of the synagogues which played a great role in the lives of Jews of both cities, filling social, educational and community needs. As both synagogues were largely in debt due to the construction and maintenance of their buildings, it was upon the Jews of the community – especially the women, with formation of sisterhoods - to help offset this debt.

By 1930, the Jewish population of Lewiston in Auburn had grown to over 750 people. By 1933 the two synagogues had established a joint cemetery. That same year, there was yet another fire, and Congregation Beth Abraham's building was destroyed a second time, and rebuilt in a new location by 1934.

In 1944, both synagogues were able to burn their mortgages. And in 1945, both synagogues offered membership to women.

==== Post WWII to the end of the sixties (1946–1969) ====
By the 1940s, shoe manufacturing came to Maine, adding a new industry to the mill town. Owners of these factories were Jewish, and came from mill towns in Massachusetts.

As early as the 30s there was a desire to create common bonds within the Jewish community. In 1950, a Jewish Community Center (JCC) was built. In 1960, the JCC hosted an American-Israeli Ball, with a guest list which included Senator Edmund Muskie, the Israeli ambassador to the United Nations, and the presidents of Bates and Colby Colleges.

==== End of the sixties to the end of the 20th century (1970–1999) ====
Lisbon Street, Lewiston's shopping district, continued to thrive during the early 1970s, but the steady decline had begun.

In 1982, Beth Jacob closed its doors and merged with the Lewiston JCC to become Temple Shalom, and in 1992, Beth Abraham Synagogue celebrated their 90th anniversary.

==== From the beginning of the 21st century to date (2000–present) ====
Temple Shalom Synagogue remains as the only synagogue to serve the Lewiston Auburn communities. In 2004, they moved from being recognized as a Conservative temple to being independent, and today their membership includes 95 families.

In 2017, with membership significantly decreased and no regular rabbi for several years, Beth Abraham synagogue held a deconsecration ceremony and closed its doors. The building was sold for development.

=== References and studies ===
- Auburn: An analysis of the Jewish community of Lewiston-Auburn, A thesis presented to the faculty of the Department of Sociology, Bates College", Raymond Theodore Zelch.
- The Jewish Community of Lewiston, student paper for Bates Sociology 222, Rohna Isaacson.

== Greater Augusta ==
In the 1930 and 1940s, the Jewish population in Maine's capital city of Augusta was quite small with under 60 individuals. In those early days before a synagogue was built, the members of what was known as the Augusta Hebrew Community congregated in a third-floor space they rented in downtown Augusta.

In 1952, Lipman Poultry moved their chicken processing plant from Bangor to Augusta, resulting in more Jewish families moving to the area. It became clear that the congregation needed its own space. In 1957, Temple Beth El was dedicated, with the Lipman family spearheading its construction.

By the 1960s, the Jewish census in Augusta had grown to well over 200, and in 1973 the small congregation in nearby Gardiner made the decision to merge with Temple Beth El, bringing their Torah scrolls and their members to Augusta.

=== Population data over the years ===
- First population estimate in 1930: 59
- Highest population estimate 1965-1985: 215
- Latest population estimate 2005: 140

=== Current Jewish organizations ===
- Temple Beth El (Reform)

=== Major events and milestones ===
==== Early immigrant period (pre-1900) ====
There is very little information known about the Jewish population of Augusta before the 20th century. The only Jewish family known to live in the area was Lewis Selbing, a Civil War hero, who moved to Maine in 1858, married Esther Bonne in 1860, enlisted in the Third Maine to fight for his adopted country, and returned to Augusta to raise a family.

==== Later immigrant period (1900–1920) ====
Augusta's Jewish population extended beyond the city of Augusta. Despite the small numbers, Ohaway Shalom synagogue opened in nearby Randolph, Maine in 1904, and in 1909, Tefereth Israel opened in Gardiner.

In 1906, Camp Kennebec opened in North Belgrade, one of the first Jewish summer camps to open in Maine.

By 1910, the Randolph synagogue had closed as most of the Jewish businesses had moved to Gardiner.

==== End of WWI to end of WWII (1921–1945) ====
The Jewish community of Gardiner rented several buildings during this time, moving their congregation from one to the next due to fire or because they had outgrown the space. In 1941, their membership was close to 14 families.

At the same time, nearby Randolph only had 11 Jewish residents, most of whom were traveling to Gardiner for religious services.

In Augusta, Temple Beth El had its beginnings as the Augusta Hebrew Community, renting space in the downtown area.

==== Post WWII to the end of the sixties (1946–1969) ====
Augusta's Jewish population grew after the war, as did the activities and organizations within the community. By the late 1940s, the Augusta-Gardiner Chapter of Hadassah was active, holding their first of what would become an annual style show at Chernowsky's Department Store, with proceeds to benefit the community.

In 1952, Lipman Poultry moved their business to Augusta, resulting in more Jewish families moving to the area. Augusta Hebrew Community outgrew their rented space, and the Lipmans led the charge to help build what would become Temple Beth El, dedicated in 1957.

==== End of the sixties to the end of the 20th century (1970–1999) ====
In 1973, Temple Beth Israel in Gardiner [closed its doors] and made the decision to merge with Temple Beth El in Augusta. By 1987, Temple Beth El joined the Reform movement, making it the only Reform synagogue in Central Maine. Ten years later, they hired their first full-time rabbi.

=== Beginning of the 21st century to date (2000–present) ===
As Maine's capital, Augusta has provided opportunities to connect to Maine's Jewish history and its widespread community. Beginning in 1995, Governor Angus King and his wife, Mary Herman, hosted a Hanukkah celebration at the Blaine House, a tradition that has continued. In 2018, the Maine State Museum opened a year-long exhibit, the first major exhibition in Maine to tell the history of the state's Jewish community. While the Holocaust and Human Rights Center (HHRC) came into being in 1985, they had no building until 2008 when the Michael Klahr Center opened on the campus of the University of Maine in Augusta. And Temple Beth El, opening their doors in 1957, is currently home to over 100 families in the Greater Augusta region.

== Greater Bangor ==
In 1849, a small group of German Jews lived in Bangor. They voted to hire a slaughterer for access to kosher meat, and to purchase a piece of land suitable for a burial ground. Later that same year, they drew up bylaws for a congregation, and by 1850, they had organized the first synagogue in Maine, Ahawas Achim (Brotherly Love).

Jewish immigrants arrived in Bangor in three separate waves. The German Jews were the first to arrive. They were a well-educated group who found it easier to assimilate than those who would follow. By the end of the 19th century, most of this group had converted to Christianity or had intermarried. In the 1860s and 1870s, a group of Lithuanian Jews arrived, followed by a wave of Russian and Polish Jews toward the end of the 19th century.

Bangor was one of Maine's wealthiest towns during these years, and drew a large immigrant population for several reasons, two of which were climate which was similar to where most of the new immigrants had come from, and because there was work to be had due to the booming lumber industry. The Independent Order of the Sons of Benjamin (I.O.S.B) became the first Jewish aid organization in Maine, and was founded with the purpose of maintaining a sanctified burial ground. After that time, the I.O.S.B continued to help new immigrants begin work as peddlers in order to serve the farmers and woodsmen in the area.

=== Population data over the years ===
- First population estimate in 1850: 33
- Highest population estimate 1940: 1650
- Latest population estimate 1995: 1000

=== Current Jewish organizations ===
- Congregation Beth Abraham (Orthodox)
- Congregation Beth El (Reform)
- Beth Israel Synagogue (Conservative)
- Mikvah at Congregation Beth Abraham

=== Major events and milestones ===
==== Early immigrant period (pre-1900) ====
In the 19th century, Bangor was one of New England's largest cities, attracting people because of the many opportunities to work in and to support the lumber industry. Bangor was known to have a small Jewish community as early as 1849 when thirteen German Jews came together to buy land for a burial ground. The Independent Order of the Sons of Benjamin (IOSB), Maine's first Jewish aide organization, loaned money for the land. In addition, the IOSB helped new immigrants with loans to get them started, loaning money for a cart and a horse so they could peddle to the lumber community.

That same group of early Jewish settlers was responsible for forming Ahawas Achim, the first organized synagogue in Maine. However, by 1856 many of those families left Bangor. The congregation dissolved and was held in trust for almost 20 years when, in 1874, the property was reclaimed as a new wave of Jewish immigration began and new families moved to Bangor.

In 1888, Congregation Beth Israel was formally organized as Lithuanian and Polish Jews moved to Bangor. By 1897, the cornerstone was laid for what is still the oldest continuously functioning synagogue in Maine.

==== Later immigrant period (1900–1920) ====
By 1901, Ahawas Achim had closed, and in 1907, Congregation Beth Israel opened. Their first years were challenging, as the congregation came together from a mix of backgrounds, from German to Polish to Lithuanian. The inability to come together and serve the entire Jewish community led to the formation of another synagogue, Congregation Beth Abraham Anshe Sfard.

On April 30, 1911, the Great Fire of Bangor swept through the city, destroying Congregation Beth Israel. By 1913, they had rebuilt and reopened.

==== End of WWI to end of WWII (1921–1945) ====
In 1920, another synagogue was formed in Bangor when a small group purchased a building and opened Toldos Itzchok. During the 1920s and 1930s, the rabbis who served Bangor served multiple synagogues. Rabbi Eliezer Levine was the first to do so, arriving in Bangor in 1925.

By 1927, a fourth temple opened. Temple Beth El was built to reflect the more modern ideas of the now first and second generations born in the US, as their parents' and grandparents' traditions no longer fit with their own. Included in those changes were the hiring of an English-speaking rabbi.

In 1932, Congregation Beth Abraham opened its doors. That same year, the synagogue was destroyed in a fire, but was rebuilt less than a year later with over 700 people attending the celebration.

In addition to synagogues, several Jewish organizations opened local chapters. But perhaps the most significant contribution, due to the many opportunities afforded to the community was the opening of the Bangor Hebrew Community Center, dedicated in 1938.

==== Post WWII to the end of the sixties (1946–1969) ====
This was an era of great growth for Bangor's Jewish community. In 1947, Bangor Hebrew School celebrated their 40th anniversary with over 100 children enrolled. In 1948, Congregation Beth Israel moved away from their Orthodox roots, and became the first synagogue in Maine to commit to the Conservative Movement by declaration of their Board of Directors. During these post war years, women's roles shifted. Mixed family seating was voted in, and the synagogue's Sisterhood was formed, devoting a great deal of time to the maintenance of the synagogue. The Jewish Community Center was at its height of popularity, creating a true sense of community throughout the 1960s.

==== End of the sixties to the end of the 20th century (1970–1999) ====
In 1981, Congregation Beth El opened, the city's first Reform synagogue.

In 1984, the Bangor Hebrew School closed their doors after having served the community for close to 80 years. Hebrew schools once again fell under the aegis of each synagogue in the area.

Congregation Beth Israel celebrated their 100th anniversary in 1988. The role of women changed significantly during this time, with women now being welcomed in roles once only filled by men.

During these years the demographics in Bangor were changing. The once great number of Jewish owned businesses and manufacturers were now few. Norman Minsky of Congregation Beth Israel recognized that in order for the organizations to continue, they would need endowments to do so.

==== Beginning of the 21st century to date (2000–present) ====
In 2012, the JCC sent their final newsletter, announcing their impending closure. With each synagogue now holding their own Hebrew schools and community programs, the need for the JCC was greatly diminished. John Bapst High School acquired the building and later had the building demolished in order to build a new gym on their campus.

Bangor continues to have three synagogues, each with a full-time rabbi, and also maintains a mikvah, the only one still in existence in Maine.

== Bath ==
In the late 1880s a handful of Jewish families settled in Bath, Maine, and by the turn of the century, close to a dozen Jewish families called Bath home.

As World War I began, Bath's shipbuilding industry was booming. With housing and other businesses now in high demand, the town's population swelled, and Bath's Jewish population grew to close to 30 families.

With enough people to now serve as a minyan (a quorum of ten men), the search began for a place in which to worship. The name was decided upon, a site was found, and Beth Israel Congregation opened its doors in 1922.

=== Population data over the years ===
- First population estimate in 1910: 82
- Highest population estimate 2005: 400
- Latest population estimate 2005: 400

=== Current Jewish organizations ===
- Beth Israel Congregation (Reform)

=== Major events and milestones ===
==== Early immigrant period (pre-1900) ====
While there were a few Jewish merchants who came to Bath to work, the first Jewish resident of Bath, was Isaac Mikelsky who arrived with his family in 1886. From that point and into the first decade of the twentieth century, more Jewish families began to arrive, most of whom were immigrants from Eastern Europe. By the end of the 19th century, the small Jewish community held services in the YMCA building.

==== Later immigrant period (1900–1920) ====
During the early part of the twentieth century, several Jewish families moved into the area, and by 1919, the decision was made by 39 founding members to build a synagogue.

Other organizations came together, offering opportunities to the burgeoning Jewish community, including the Naomi Club, the Happy Twenty, a local chapter of the Workman's Circle, the YMHA and the YWHA and the Bath Hebrew Ladies Society.

==== End of WWI to end of WWII (1920–1945) ====
Before the construction of the synagogue was completed, services were held in various halls in town. Upon its completion in 1922, the president of the synagogue led a parade through town to celebrate the opening of Congregation Beth Israel, with founding members carrying the Torah and the American flag.

Other organizations continued to come into being during this time including Bath's chapter of B'nai B'rith in 1921.

In 1939 Bath was one of 2,000 communities around the US to participate in an annual Brotherhood Week. The Catholic, Protestant and Jewish communities were invited to come together and consider "a new study of the Bill of Rights and its implications for a free America". This event was followed with another coming together of Bath's religious community in 1943 when an interfaith council was formed between the Catholic and Jewish communities to "Coordinate the religious forces of the city".

As was true in other Maine towns during this time, Bath's Main Street became home to several Jewish-owned businesses. In 1940, those businesses were the target of an act of anti-Semitic vandalism.

While the synagogue was successful in paying off its mortgage in 1932, WWII took a toll on their ability to continue paying for a rabbi. Instead, a lay leader stepped forward and served the community for the next 40 years.

==== Post WWII to the end of the sixties (1946–1969) ====
By the 1950s, an exodus from Bath began as the Jewish population sought greater economic and professional opportunities elsewhere.

==== End of the sixties to the end of the 20th century (1970–1999) ====
During the 1960s, Beth Israel Congregation continued, thanks to strong leadership and celebrated their 40th anniversary in 1962.

By the 1980s, the need for a local Hebrew school became clear, as families only had out-of-town options to choose from. Once again, a lay leader came forward and volunteered to teach children in Bath, bringing a wave of young Jewish families to the area.

In 1996, the synagogue hired their first rabbi in over 45 years], and the very next year they celebrated their 75th anniversary.

==== Beginning of the 21st century to date (2000–present) ====
The Hebrew school grew from just a few to well over 40 children, and in 2002, the congregation purchased a building to serve as the school's permanent home.

In 2015, the congregation formally affiliated with the Reform Movement.

== Biddeford-Saco ==
The first Jewish residents arrived in the Biddeford-Saco area in the 1880s. The early Jewish community was comnposed mainly of immigrants from Lithuania, Russia and Poland who fled religious persecution and economic hardship. Portland, was a port of entry into the United States at that time, and Biddeford was a nearby town with good economic opportunities. In addition, many of Biddeford-Saco's earlies Jewish families had also lived elsewhere in American before settling in the area, choosing it over the larger cities they'd left behind.

The earliest Jewish migrants to Biddeford had no synagogue, but did have Torah scrolls that had been brought over from Europe. Daily services were held at community members' homes, and in 1892 a Hebrew Congregation was organized.

By 1900, the community was being served by the first known Biddeford rabbi, Hirsche Hazid, and in 1907, the community incorporated under the name of "Biddeford Hebrew Synagogue Association." They had raised enough money by then to buy what had been an Episcopal church in town, and by 1910 had officially made it their home, naming it Congregation Etz Chaim.

=== Current Jewish organizations ===
- Congregation Etz Chaim (Non-denominational)

=== Major events and milestones ===
==== Early immigrant period (pre-1900) ====
By 1880, the first Jewish residents began to arrive in the Biddeford-Saco area. Most were from Lithuania, Russia and Poland. By 1890, they began to meet informally in people's homes, using Torah scrolls they had brought with them from Europe.

In 1892, A Hebrew Congregation] was officially set up in one member's second-floor apartment. As these gatherings grew, they moved to larger spaces.

==== Later immigrant period (1900–1920) ====
Congregation Etz Chaim was founded in 1906, and in 1907 they were able to purchase a former Episcopal church as their home.

==== End of WWI to end of WWII (1920–1945) ====
Congregation Etz Chaim served as the center for all religious and social events in the Jewish community and relied on lay leaders to serve, as they had little money to pay a rabbi. The basement of the synagogue served both as a mikveh and as the Hebrew school, established in 1922.

During the 1920s, Etz Chaim had close to 40 members, a number that grew to 70 family memberships by 1939 when the synagogue celebrated the ownership of their building and burned their mortgage.

==== Post WWII to the end of the sixties (1946–1969) ====
By the mid-1950s, the congregation had grown to more than 125 families. However, just a few years after, membership began to decline. In 1950, there were close to 45 Jewish-owned businesses in Biddeford But the children of these business owners were not returning to the area as adults, seeking opportunities elsewhere. In addition, with the decline of the textile industry, those businesses suffered. By 1967, the Hebrew school closed, as did the synagogue, except for high holidays when services were conducted by visiting rabbis.

==== End of the sixties to the end of the 20th century (1970–1999) ====
By the 1970s, the synagogue no longer had a rabbi or a Hebrew school, and the already reduced membership dwindled to about 25 families. In addition, the number of Jewish owned businesses in Biddeford was also on the decline, as was the town's textile industry, and by 1990 there were just 15 Jewish businesses remaining. The synagogue remained open only for the High Holidays, and there was even the discussion of closing altogether.

Beginning in the 1980s, there was a resurgence of young Jewish families moving to Biddeford. And by the end of the decade, Etz Chaim left their Orthodox roots and began operating as an unaffiliated synagogue. By 1988, they reopened their Hebrew school, and in 1993, the now egalitarian synagogue celebrated their first bat mitzvah.

==== Beginning of the 21st century to date (2000–present) ====
In 2007, Biddeford's Etz Chaim synagogue celebrated their 100th anniversary, and remains open today.

== Old Orchard Beach ==
Despite Old Orchard Beach's popularity as a summertime destination, in the late 1800s, there were no options for Jews to travel to the town for any more than a beach day as there were no hotels or kosher restaurants serving them.

Joseph H. Goodkowsky, who had come to the US from Poland in the late 1800s, moved from Lewiston to Biddeford to work selling clothes wholesale. In the summer when work slowed, he worked in nearby Old Orchard Beach operating a variety of boarding houses, making them available to Jews.

When the great fire of 1907 claimed almost everything on East Grand Avenue, including the boarding houses, Goodkowsky began construction of the Lafayette Hotel with lumber salvaged from a razed mill in Biddeford. Two years later, the hotel opened its doors with 45 guest rooms and a kosher kitchen. As the Lafayette was one of the few hotels around after the fire, the hotel was in demand and increased its capacity over the next several years.

With the large number of Jewish guests, the building of a synagogue became an obvious next step. A committee was formed, a small lot of land behind the Lafayette Hotel was purchased from the bank, and in July 1912, Congregation Beth Israel was finished.

The synagogue served as the foundation for the Jewish community. Businesses opened throughout Old Orchard Beach to better serve the Jewish population. There was a kosher butcher, a kosher baker, a kosher market. Eventually, there were three kosher inns in town as well, including the Empire Hotel built in 1909. Palace Playland (owned in the 1950s by future philanthropist Bernard Osher), with all its attractions, invited people right to the center of town. And all the while, the Lafayette and Beth Israel maintained close ties, with religious events being held in the synagogue, and receptions following at the hotel.

Beginning in the 1960s, Jewish life in Old Orchard Beach began to reflect changes taking place elsewhere. Orthodox dietary observance was not as much in demand, hotels were quickly being overtaken by motels which offered more privacy, and families were no longer coming together for long stays. The large hotels were being razed or converted to motels. Old Orchard Beach's heyday was coming to an end. In 1965 the Lafayette dining room was closed, and in 1970, the Goodkowsky family heirs sold the hotel. Old Orchard Beach continues to be the home of many families who have been spending summers there for years.

The Weinstein brothers, who have lived in Old Orchard Beach since they were small boys, watch over this building with love, ensuring the upkeep of one of Maine's oldest synagogues.

=== Current Jewish organizations ===
- Congregation Beth Israel

=== Major events and milestones ===
==== Later immigrant period (1900–1920) ====
In 1909, Joseph Goodkowsky built the Lafayette Hotel, the first kosher hotel in Old Orchard Beach. The hotel's popularity grew quickly, and soon became too small to hold services. A committee was formed to launch the construction of a synagogue for summertime visitors. Congregation Beth Israel was erected in 1912, next door to the Lafayette.

==== Post WWII to the end of the sixties (1946–1969) ====
Beginning in the 1960s, Jewish life in Old Orchard Beach began to reflect changes taking place elsewhere. Orthodox dietary observance was not as much in demand, hotels were quickly being overtaken by motels which offered more privacy, and families were no longer coming together for long stays. The large hotels were being razed or converted to motels. Old Orchard Beach's heyday was coming to an end. In 1965 the Lafayette dining room was closed.

==== End of the sixties to the end of the 20th century (1970–1999) ====
By the 1970s, the number of summer visitors dropped, and the synagogue's population dwindled. In 1970, the Goodkowsky family heirs sold the Lafayette Hotel.

==== Beginning of the 21st century to date (2000–present) ====
The synagogue remains open for the High Holidays and for Shabbat services. There are no longer any Jewish run businesses or kosher establishments in the town.

== Greater Portland ==
Jews arrived in Portland, Maine as early as 1866. Maine, a heavily rural state, attracted relatively few Jews during the mid-1800s and was home to only one city, Portland, whose estimated Jewish population in 1878 exceeded one hundred.

These early settlers were determined to learn English quickly, recognizing the importance of feeling a part of and thriving in a non-Jewish city. They worked quickly to build a Jewish community by addressing immediate needs: arrangements to hold religious services, access to and supply of kosher meat, and a burial ground in which to bury their dead. All of these arrangements were in place by 1880.

During those early years and through the early part of the 20th century, most of Portland's Jewish population resided in what is now known as the India Street neighborhood, what was then the most diverse part of the city. The relatively small area became home to three Orthodox synagogues, all of which had opened their doors by 1917.

=== Current Jewish organizations ===
- Jewish Community Alliance of Southern Maine (Merged JCC, Jewish Federation, and Jewish Family Services program)
- B'nai Portland (Unaffiliated)
- Chabad of Maine (Chabad-Lubavitch)
- Congregation Bet Ha'am (Reform)
- Congregation Shaarey Tphiloh (Modern Orthodox)
- Etz Chaim Synagogue (Unafiliated)
- Temple Beth El (Conservative)

=== Major events and milestones ===
==== Early immigrant period (pre-1900) ====
During the 1870s, the first Jewish settlers arrived in Portland from Eastern Europe, with 20-30 Jewish families living in Portland by 1874. By 1875, the first burial ground was purchased in South Portland, and by 1883, Congregation Beth Judah, Portland's first synagogue, was founded.

During the 1880s a wave of immigrants from Russia and Poland arrived in the US, and Portland's Jewish community increased to 60 families. Most of these new immigrants worked as peddlers and settled in the area close to the three synagogues. By 1884, the first Hebrew school opened its doors. In 1886, Portland celebrated its 100th anniversary, and invited members of the Jewish community to attend and to address the crowd.

By the end of the century, the Hebrew Loan association was founded, offering Jews interest-free loans to get started in the community.

==== Later immigrant period (1900–1920) ====
With Portland's growing Jewish population, the number of religious, educational and fraternal organizations increased significantly. The Workmen's Circle, a Yiddish-speaking fraternal order, was organized in 1907 and grew from 18 members to 150. This group established a library, conducted Americanization classes for immigrants and sponsored lecture courses for members. In addition, The Young Men's Hebrew Association was founded, as was the Portland Hebrew School, a Portland chapter of Hadassah, and United Hebrew Charities. By 1907, Portland's Jewish community had grown to 1,500, and just five years later, that number increased to 2,000. With that growth, the small synagogues became inadequate to serve the now significant Jewish community, and Shaarey Tphiloh was chartered and built.

==== End of WWI to end of WWII (1920–1945) ====
By 1920, the Jewish population of Portland had increased to 3,000, and numerous charitable and social organizations came to be. The Mount Sinai Cemetery Association was formed, and the newly formed Portland Council of Jewish Women assisted immigrants and were active in getting Jews to register and vote in political elections.

Ground breaking ceremonies for the Jewish Home for the Aged were held in 1928, and the new Jewish Community Center opened in the fall of 1938.

The Jacob Cousins Post, No. 99, Jewish War Veterans, came into being in 1935, with a mission of securing legislation in the interest of veterans and "to defending the honor of the Jewish people against detractors."

By this time, there were three synagogues, all within just a few blocks of one another The two major congregations in Portland, Etz Chaim Synagogue and Shaarey Tphiloh, stood just two blocks apart, and were rivals. Members of one would not participate in any event of the other. In 1929, a representative group was put in place, with representatives from the three synagogues. By securing this committee, the three synagogues were now able to manage the supply and sale of kosher meat, support the Portland Hebrew School, and pay the salary of a shared rabbi.

==== Post WWII to the end of the sixties (1946–1969) ====
After the War, the Jewish Federation restructured their bylaws and became the central, more efficient fundraising and social service arm for Portland's Jewish community, raising money for the organizations and also assuming responsibility for resettling Holocaust refugee families.

Portland's first non-Orthodox synagogue, Temple Beth El, was founded in 1947, as more of Portland's Jewish population moved away from the Munjoy Hill area and into the Woodfords area of the city. By 1948, more than half of the city's Hebrew school students lived in Woodfords.

In 1952, the Portland Hebrew Day School, later renamed the Levey Day School, opened.

By 1954, Shaarey Tphiloh opened a second synagogue one block from the new Temple Beth El, and determined to keep both buildings. That same year, the "Slum Clearance and Redevelopment Authority" project razed the neighborhood known as Vine-Deer-Chatham, a neighborhood made up largely of Jewish and Italian immigrant families.

==== End of the sixties to the end of the 20th century (1970–1999) ====
By the early 1970s, most of Portland and Maine's social barriers for Jews had been removed, creating more opportunities for both social and civic engagement. Portland's first Reform congregation opened their doors in 1985, and a Chabad opened in 1987.

The Jewish Community Center, once a hub of activity, sold their building in 1979, as numbers dwindled, and by 1999, the organization merged with the Jewish Federation and became the Jewish Community Alliance.

In 1995, Temple Beth El hired Rabbi Carolyn Braun, Maine's first Conservative female rabbi.

==== From the beginning of the 21st century to date (2000–to date) ====
Portland is currently home to one Reform synagogue, one Conservative synagogue, one Modern Orthodox synagogue, one Chabad congregation and two unaffiliated congregations. In 2016, the Modern Orthodox synagogue downsized and sold their building on Noyes Street, Shaarey Tphiloh, and now holds services in Temple Beth El, though they remain separate organizations with separate prayers.

In 2017, the Jewish Community Alliance opened their brand new building.

== Greater Rockland ==
The first Jewish settler arrived in the Rockland area before 1790, and by 1879, a small but vibrant Jewish population had been established.

From the beginning, religious faith played a very important role in Rockland's mostly Orthodox Jewish community. In 1879 they held their first High Holy Day observance, a tradition that continues unbroken to this day, according to Adas Yoshuron'srecords. Services were held in a rented space on Main Street.

As the years passed and the population grew, the search began for a synagogue. In 1912, the Advent Christian Church was purchased by a handful of Jewish immigrants, and Adas Yoshuron synagogue opened its doors, welcoming a congregation of 31 families.

== Greater Waterville ==
In the early years of the 20th century, seven Jewish men settled in Waterville. They earned their livelihood by peddling various wares, and eventually banded together in an effort to foster Judaism for themselves and their families. Beth Israel Congregation was chartered on June 16, 1902. At first, they conducted services at various private homes in the community, with High Holiday services held in the Hose No. 4 Fire Station in town. In 1903, a barn was purchased and dismantled, and by securing additional new lumber, work was begun on the new building. In 1905, the Beth Israel Synagogue on Kelsey Street was completed, its construction fully supported from dues of members, which at that time, were ten cents a week, or $5.00 per year.

=== Current Jewish organizations ===
- Temple Beth El (conservative)

== Notable Jewish People from Maine ==
- Shirley Povich, Sportswriter for the Washington Post, father of Maury Povich
- William Cohen, U.S. Senator for Maine, United States Secretary of Defense. Born to a Jewish father and a Christian mother, Cohen was told he would have to convert to Judaism before becoming a Bar mitzvah.
- Linda Lavin, actress/singer
- Rob Elowitch, professional wrestler
- Hiram Abrams, co-founder of Paramount Pictures, founder of United Artists
- The Alfond family, business-owners and philanthropists
- Marjorie W. Sharmat, American children's writer
- Judd Nelson, actor
