= Lawrence Pugh =

American businessman

Lawrence Reynolds Pugh (January 22, 1933 – December 3, 2015) was an American businessman, who became chief executive officer of the VF Corporation, and former director at Unum and Black & Decker. In his retirement, he served on boards at Colby College, the Harold Alfond Foundation, and the Portland Museum of Art, and the U.S. Biathlon Association.

He died on December 3, 2015, at the age of 82 in Naples, Florida.
