= Ram Island (Saco Bay) =

- Interactive map of Ram Island
- Coordinates: 43.467069°N 70.356529°W
- Country: United States
- State: Maine
- County: York
- Time zone: UTC-5 (Eastern (EST))
  - Summer (DST): UTC-4 (EDT)
- ZIP Code: 04072 (Saco)
- Area code: 207

Ram Island is a small uninhabited island in Saco Bay, Maine, United States. It is owned by the University of New England (UNE), which uses it for marine research purposes. It was purchased by the Girard family in 1999. It was transferred into the possession of UNE's Biddeford campus fifteen years later.

== Gallery ==
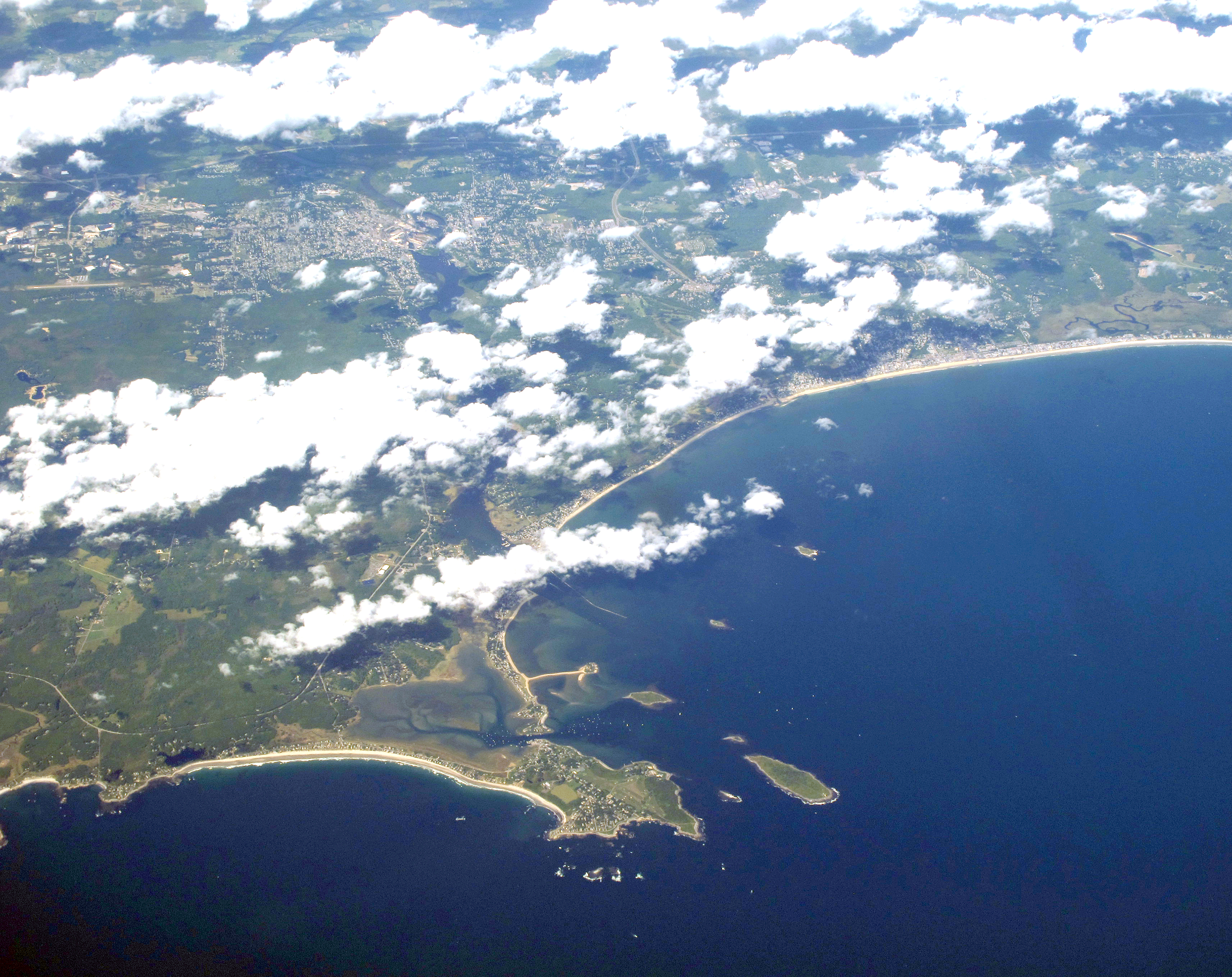
Westerly aerial view of Saco Bay. Ram Island is the smaller of the two islands in the north
