= Donald Pilon (politician) =

American politician

Member of the Maine House of Representatives for the 133rd District (Saco)
- In office December 2004 – December 2012
- Succeeded by: Barry Hobbins

Mayor of Saco, Maine
- In office December 2013 – December 2015
- Preceded by: Mark Johnston
- Succeeded by: Ron Michaud

Personal details
- Party: Democratic
- Education: University of New England (BA)
- Profession: Real Estate Broker

Donald Pilon is an American politician from Maine. Pilon, a Democrat, served four terms in the Maine House of Representatives from 2004 to 2012. In June 2012, Pilon lost a Democratic primary to fellow State Representative Linda Valentino for State Senate. Pilon served as mayor of Saco, Maine from 2013 to 2015. He ran unsuccessfully for mayor in 2015 and 2017.

Pilon is a graduate of the University of New England.

== See also ==
- List of mayors of Saco, Maine
