= Caty Flagg =

American ice hockey goaltender

- Born: August 2, 1998 (age 27) Methuen, Massachusetts, United States
- Height: 168 cm (5 ft 6 in)
- Position: Goaltender
- NWHL team Former teams: Buffalo Beauts; University of Massachusetts Boston; University of New England
- Playing career: 2020–present

Caty Flagg (born August 2, 1998) is an American professional ice hockey goaltender, currently playing with the Buffalo Beauts in the NWHL.

== Career ==
Flagg attended high school at Austin Preparatory School, where she served as the starting goalie for the school's women's hockey team. She was named Most Valuable Player of the Catholic Conference in 2016, posting a 22-2 record with 10 shutouts and leading the school to the state championship. She was also named 2016 Miss Hockey by ESPN Boston and named to the Boston Herald's 2016 All-scholastic team.

After completing her high school, she would study and play at the University of New England for two years before transferring to University of Massachusetts Boston. She started 25 out of 26 games in her senior NCAA year, posting a 1.84 GAA and .942 save percentage, both second-best in the conference, and becoming the first UMass-Boston player to be named New England Hockey Conference Goaltender of the Year.

In June 2020, she signed her first professional contract with the Buffalo Beauts for the 2020–21 NWHL season.

== Style of play ==
Flagg has been noted both for her patience and positioning within the goal crease, rarely having to scramble to reach pucks despite her smaller stature, but has attracted some criticism for her poorer rebound control.

== Personal life ==
Flagg has a bachelor's degree in exercise and health sciences from the University of Massachusetts Boston. In addition to ice hockey, she also played softball at the University of New England.
