= Emma B. Dunham =

American poet and teacher (1826–1910)

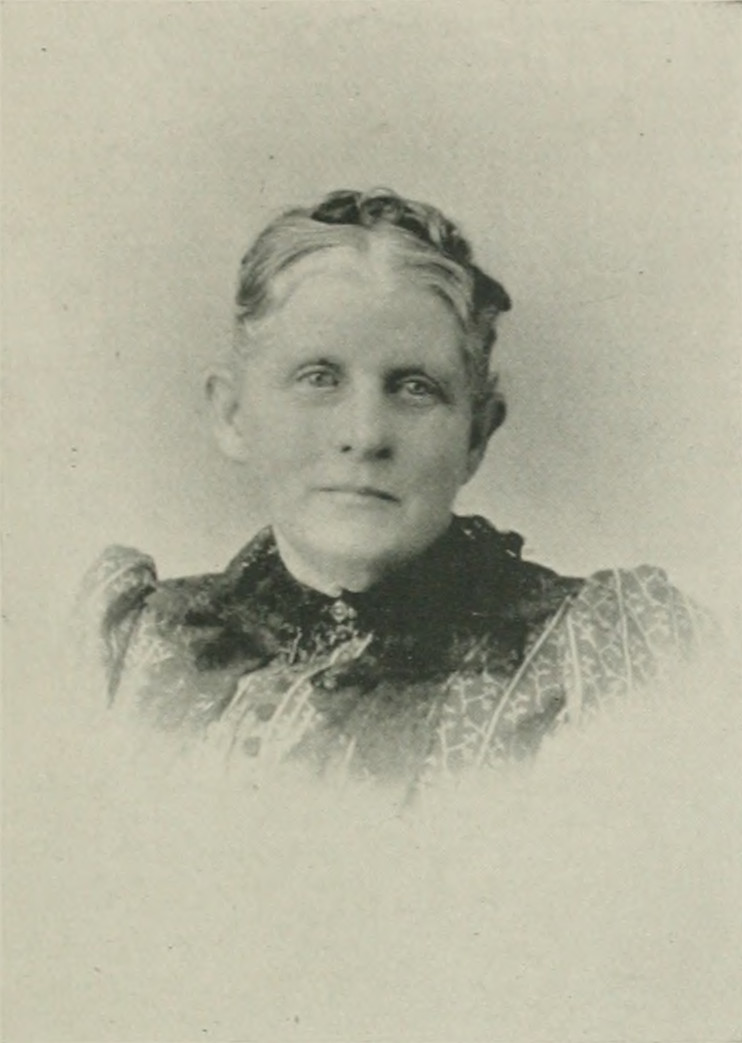
- Photo in A Woman of the Century
- Born: Eunice Emma Bedelia Sargent; August 21, 1826; Minot, Maine, U.S.
- Died: September 14, 1910 (aged 84); Deering, Maine, U.S.
- Resting place: Pine Grove Cemetery, Portland, Maine, U.S.
- Education: Westbrook Seminary
- Occupations: poet, teacher
- Spouse: Rufus Dunham (m. 1845)
- Relatives: Judge Joseph Augustus Sargent, Judge William Griffith Sargent (brothers)
- Writing career
- Pen name: various, including "Leoline"
- Notable works: "Margaret, a Home Opera in Six Acts"

Emma B. Dunham (née, Sargent; pen names, various, including Leoline; August 21, 1826 – September 14, 1910) was an American poet and teacher of the long nineteenth century. She began writing for publication when very young, and continued to write for newspapers and magazines throughout her life. Some of her work was republished in Europe.

== Early life and education ==
Eunice Emma Bedelia Sargent was born in Minot, Maine, August 21, 1826. (Note: According to Griffith (1888), Emma was born August, 25, 1825; according to Willard & Livermore (1893), Emma was born August 31, 1826.) One of nine children, she was the fourth child in the family of Capt. Joseph Smith Sargent and Ann Hoyt Sargent. Her oldest brother was Judge Joseph Augustus Sargent of Minnesota. Her younger brother, Judge William Griffith Sargent, was of Kansas; during the Civil War, he was under Ulysses S. Grant, made major.

Dunham attended the district school. She moved with her parents to Portland, Maine, at the age of nine years. There, she attended public and private schools and had the benefit of private teachers. Her school education was finished in Westbrook Seminary. Her collection of natural curiosities was begun when she was about eleven years old.

== Career ==
Children attended Dunham's school for the pleasure as well as instruction to be had there.

Dunham began to write when very young, her first poems published before she was sixteen. She changed pen names often, dreading to have the public know her as an author, until, after years of success, she gained courage to use her own name. Her writings consisted largely of poetry, but also included sketches on natural history, essays, letters of travel, and stories for children. Some of her songs were set to music. "Margaret, a Home Opera in Six Acts", is one of the best of her poetic productions. It was brought out in 1875. Her poems appeared in the Portland Transcript, Press, Argus, Boston Journal, Louie's Repository, and many other well-known publications. For years, she was a regular contributor to the religious papers of the Universalist denomination.

== Personal life ==
She married Rufus Dunham, of Westbrook, Maine, August 25, 1845, a manufacturer of Britannia and silver-plated ware. They had three sons and two daughters. Four other children died young.

At Dunham's suggestion, the All Souls Universalist Church was organized in 1881, she becoming one of the original members.

Dunham eventually moved to Deering, Maine, and died there September 14, 1910. She was buried at Pine Grove Cemetery in Portland.
