= Alumni Hall (University of New England) =

- U.S. National Register of Historic Places
- U.S. Historic district – Contributing property
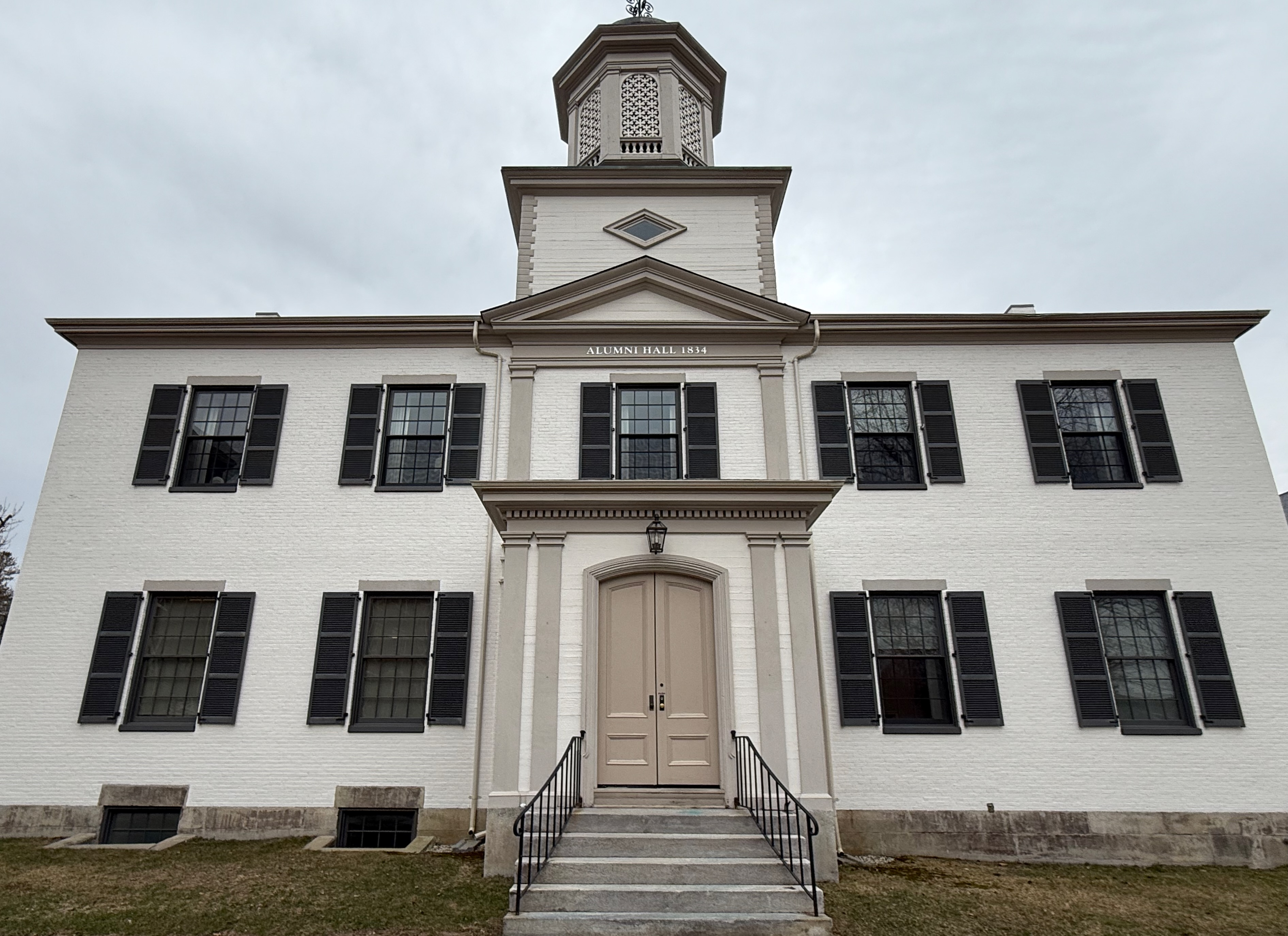
- The building in 2025

- Location within Maine Location within the United States
- Location: University of New England campus, Portland, Maine
- Coordinates: 43°41′00″N 70°17′46″W
- Built: 1834 (192 years ago)
- Part of: Westbrook College Historic District (ID77000066)
- NRHP reference No.: 77000066
- Added to NRHP: September 15, 1977

Alumni Hall is a historic building on the campus of University of New England in Portland, Maine, United States. Completed in 1834, it is now part of the Westbrook College Historic District, which was added to the National Register of Historic Places in 1977.

== History ==
Alumni Hall (then known as the Seminary Building) was the original building on the campus when Westbrook Seminary, a predecessor of the University of New England, was established in 1831. It opened its doors on June 9, 1834. It was given its current name after an 1894 renovation.

The structure's cupola is a remnant of Portland's former Market House, which stood in Monument Square between 1825 and 1833, when the building was remodeled to become the first Portland City Hall. An inscription by Levi Quinby Pierce was etched into the bell tower during its addition to Alumni Hall.

The building was renovated between April 2015 and June 2016, having been closed since 2004.

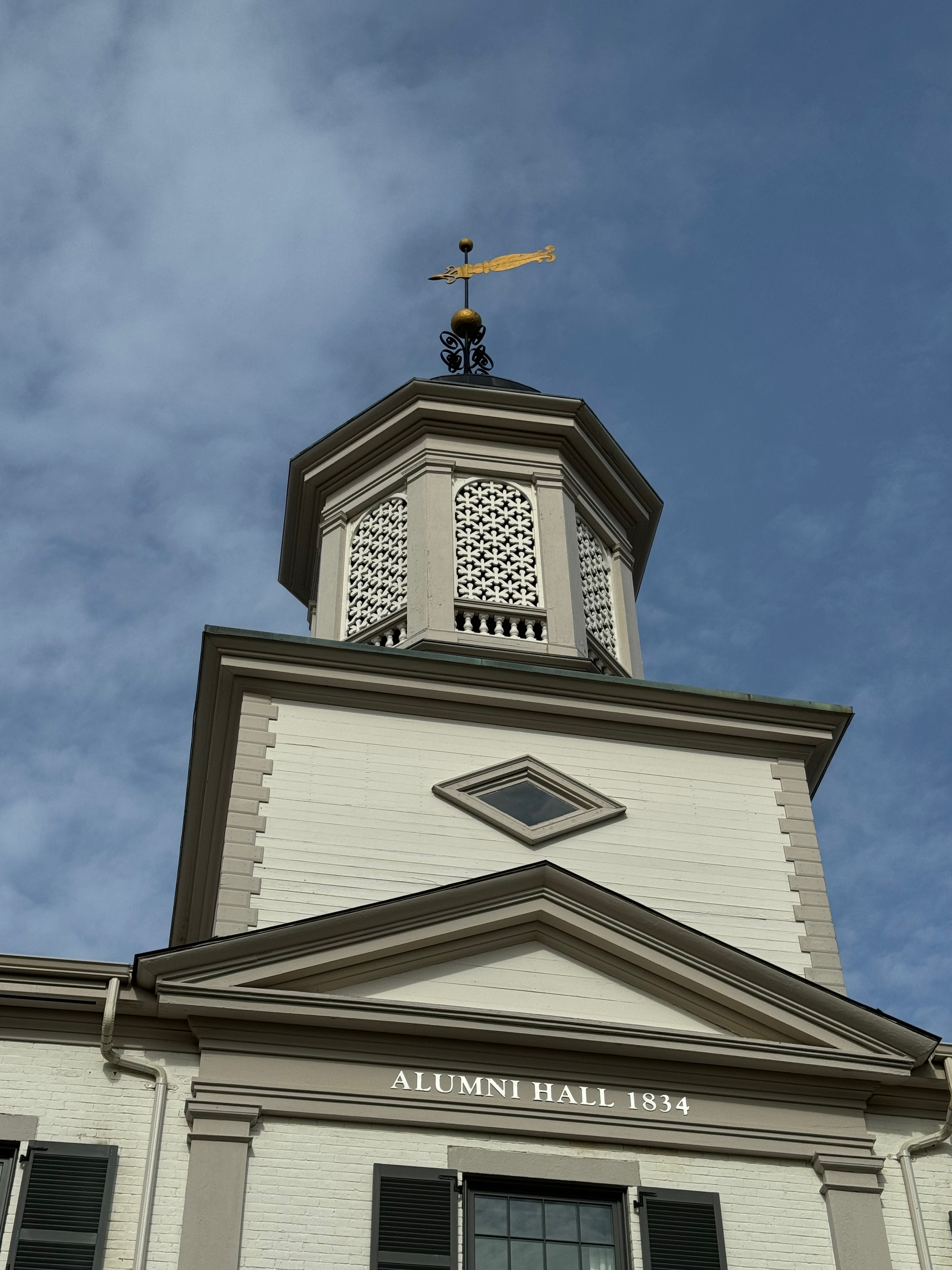
Cupola detail

== See also ==
- National Register of Historic Places listings in Cumberland County, Maine
