= List of mayors of Saco, Maine =

The following is a list of mayors of the city of Saco, Maine, United States.

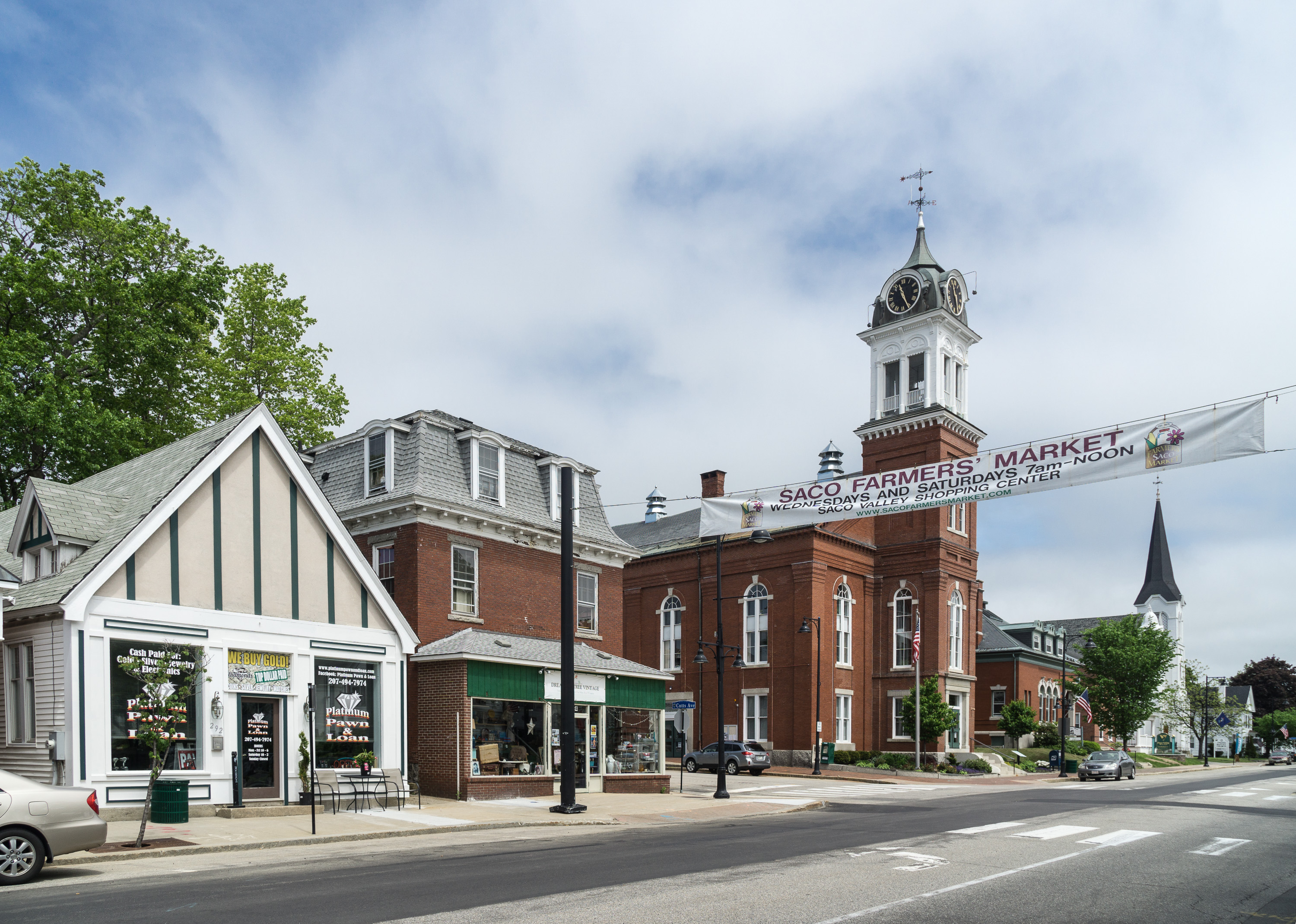
View of city hall building (with clock tower) on Main Street in Saco, Maine, 2017

- Joseph Hobson, 1867
- James M. Deering, 1868
- Moses Lowell, 1869-1870
- Oliver Dyer, 1871
- Edward P. Burnham, 1872-1873
- George A. Carter, 1874-1875
- Paul Chadbourne, 1876
- Ira H. Foss, 1877
- Oliver C. Clark, 1878-1881
- George F. Owen, 1882-1883
- J. W. Hobson, 1884
- Roscoe L. Bowers, 1885-1886
- Willis T. Emmons, 1887-1889
- Enoch Lowell, 1890-1891
- Jas. O. Bradbury, 1892-1893
- Frank Foss, 1894-1895
- Samuel L. Lord, 1896-1898
- Luther R. Moore, 1899, 1903-1904
- William J. Maybury, 1900
- Geo. L. Crosman, 1901
- Wm. O. Freeman, 1902
- Philip C. Tapley, 1905-1906
- Harry A. Weymouth, 1907-1908
- Elroy H. Mitchell, 1909-1910
- Walter J. Gilpatric, 1911, 1922-1923
- Frank L. Palmer, 1912
- Myron A. Pillsbury, 1913-1914
- Jas. H. Fenderson, 1915-1917
- Edgar H. Minot, 1918-1920
- George R. Love, 1921
- John G. Smith, ca.1924-1927
- Willis T. Emmons, ca.1928-1929
- John G. Smith, ca.1930
- John D. Fernald, ca.1932-1935
- Ralph L. Scammon, ca.1936-1938
- Lewis G. Brock, ca.1939-1940
- Gerry B. Nutting, ca.1941
- Lawrence Dolby, ca.1945
- Harry A. Warren, ca.1953-1954
- Peter Garland, ca.1956-1959
- Donald C. Doyle,

ca.1967-1968

- William D. Johnson, ca.1999
- Ron Michaud, ca.2009
- Mark Johnston, ca.2012
- Don Pilon, 2013–2015
- Marston Lovell, ca.2018
- Jodi MacPhail, ca.2023–present

== See also ==
- Saco history
