= Levey Day School =

Jewish school in Portland, Maine

Coordinates: 43.6658°N 70.2835°W

The Levey Day School is a Jewish day school in Portland, Maine, United States. It is the only Jewish school in northern New England. It was founded as the Portland Hebrew Day School in 1952 and accredited by the New England Association of Schools and Colleges in 2022. In May 2022, the school celebrated its 70th anniversary.
