= Harold Alfond Foundation =

Nonprofit organization in Portland, United States

Harold Alfond Foundation is a charitable foundation in the U.S. state of Maine.

It was founded in 1950 by businessman Harold Alfond, founder of Dexter Shoe Company. Between 1950 and 2003, the foundation has contributed more than $100 million to charitable causes, and as of 2008 had over $106 million in assets. In 2014, the foundation announced that it would give $500 to every newborn baby in Maine.
