= Susan Alfond =

American investor and philanthropist

- Born: Susan Gail Alfond; 1946 (age 79–80)
- Children: 3
- Father: Harold Alfond
- Relatives: Bill Alfond (brother); Peter Alfond (brother); Ted Alfond (brother)

Susan Gail Alfond (born 1946) is an American investor, philanthropist, and billionaire.

== Biography ==
Alfond was born to a Jewish family, the daughter of Dorothy (née Levine) and Harold Alfond. Her father founded the Dexter Shoe Company in 1958 and sold it to Warren Buffett in 1993 for $433 million of Berkshire Hathaway stock. Forbes lists her as the richest person in Maine.

== Personal life ==
Alfond has three children, Emily Pearl, Daniel Pearl, and David Pearl. She lives in Scarborough, Maine.
