= Peter Alfond =

- Born: May 17, 1952; Waterville, Maine, U.S.
- Died: July 10, 2017 (aged 65); West Palm Beach, Florida, U.S.
- Education: Rollins College
- Occupations: Investor, philanthropist
- Spouse: K. Lynn (m. 1976; div. 1992)
- Children: 4
- Father: Harold Alfond
- Family: Susan Alfond (sister); Bill Alfond (brother); Ted Alfond (brother)

Peter Alfond (May 17, 1952 – July 10, 2017) was an American billionaire, investor, and philanthropist.

== Early life ==
Peter Alfond was born to a Jewish family, the son of Dorothy (née Levine) and businessman-philanthropist Harold Alfond. Alfond graduated from Rollins College in 1975.

== Career ==
Harold Alfond founded the Dexter Shoe Company in 1958 and sold it in 1993 for $433 million of Berkshire Hathaway stock.

In 1993, he created the Peter Alfond Foundation whose mission is to invest in innovative educational and wellness opportunities that strengthen communities, making meaningful, positive, and direct impact in New England and the Caribbean. In 2020, the foundation made substantial one-time grants, including $8 million to the Alfond Youth and Community Center, $40 million to MaineGeneral Health, $10 million to the Vimenti Charter School, and $2 million to the Teaching Kitchen Collaborative. It also makes smaller annual grants to organizations in its geographic and programmatic focus area.

== Personal life ==
Alfond was married to K. Lynn, they met at Rollins College in Winter Park, Florida and had children: Rebekah, Kyle, V & Sarah.

== Death ==
Peter Alfond died on July 10, 2017, of complications from malaria, which he contracted while on a trip to Africa. He was 65 years old.
