= Justin Alfond =

American politician and real estate developer

Member of the Maine Senate from the 27th district
- In office December 2008 – December 2016
- Preceded by: Ethan Strimling
- Succeeded by: Ben Chipman

Personal details
- Born: January 8, 1975 (age 51) Dexter, Maine, U.S.
- Party: Democratic
- Spouse: Rachael Weinstein
- Children: 1
- Parent: Bill Alfond (father)
- Relatives: Harold Alfond (grandfather)
- Education: Tulane University
- Website: JustinAlfond.com

Justin Loring Alfond (born January 8, 1975) is an American politician and real estate developer. He served as a Democratic State Senator from the 8th District, which represents much of Portland. Alfond was first elected to the State Senate in 2008 to replace Democrat Ethan Strimling; he beat former State Senator Anne Rand and Cliff Ginn. He was re-elected in 2010 and 2012. In 2012, he faced Green Independent Party Chair Asher Platts. Alfond won with 71% of the vote in a two-way race.

Following his re-election to a third term in November 2012, he was chosen as President of the Maine Senate by his fellow Democrats in the Maine Senate. Upon being re-elected to his fourth term, he was chosen to be the leader of the now-minority Democrats.

Alfond was the second youngest Senate President since 1880, when Joseph A. Locke held the position at 36 years old.

== Early life and education ==
Alfond is the son of Joan (née Loring) and Bill Alfond. He is the grandson of businessman Harold Alfond, the founder of the Dexter Shoe Company. He has two siblings, Kenden, and Reis. His father worked for the family business, Dexter Shoes, as the director of the company's golf and bowling shoe division; and also served as a trustee of the Governor Dummer Academy. He attended schools in Waterville and Dexter prior to attending Noble and Greenough School in Dedham, Massachusetts. He then attended Tulane University in New Orleans, Louisiana, and majored in business management. He was briefly a professional golfer.

== Politics ==
In 2012, Maine Citizens for Clean Elections noted in a published report that Alfond, despite funding his own campaigns through public financing, raised significant money through a leader political action committee (PAC). He raised over $192,000 for the Alfond Business, Community & Democracy PAC between its creation in 2009 and 2012.

On November 21, 2013, Alfond voted against allowing a bill submitted by Rep. Diane Russell (D-Portland) which would have legalized, taxed, and regulated the use of marijuana in the state, to proceed to debate during the second session of the 126th Legislature, which typically only addresses a limited number of bills. The Maine Legislative Council, of which Alfond was a member of as Senate President, voted 5-5, meaning that no legislative action would be taken until at least 2015. Disappointment was expressed over the vote since Alfond represents Portland, a city that only weeks prior voted overwhelmingly in favor of legalizing possession of up to 2.5 ounces of marijuana for adults over 21.

On December 18, 2013, Alfond announced that he submitted emergency legislation to attempt to help resolve a lease dispute between the Portland Pirates and the Cumberland County Civic Center by allowing the team to receive a share of alcohol revenue, which was illegal under Maine law but the Pirates had originally sought.

On June 30, 2014, the Talking Points Memo website claimed that some Maine adherents to the sovereign citizen movement called for Alfond and a fellow Democrat, House Speaker Mark Eves, to be tried, convicted, and executed for treason during meetings with Governor Paul LePage in 2013. LePage has denied that such discussions took place, even after learning audio recordings exist of two men claiming such a discussion took place.

== Personal life ==
He is married to Rachael Weinstein.

In 2004, he founded the Maine Chapter of the League of Young Voters, serving for four years as its director. He serves on the boards of many organizations, including Avesta Housing, Opportunity Maine, Maine Initiatives, Kennebec Valley Community College, the New England Board of Higher Education and the New England Secondary School Consortium. He lives in Portland's West End.
