= Alfond Stadium =

Alfond Stadium may refer to:

- Alfond Stadium (Rollins College), Winter Park, Florida
- Alfond Sports Stadium (University of Maine), Orono, Maine
