= Danielle Ripich =

Former President of The University of New England

Danielle Newberry Ripich (born March 4, 1945) is a retired American academic who served as president of the University of New England, Maine, from 2006 to 2017. She has a background in speech pathology and communication studies.

Ripich was born and raised in Portsmouth, Ohio, the daughter of two schoolteachers. She studied speech pathology at Cleveland State University, completing a B.A. and M.A., and later received a Ph.D. from Kent State University. Ripich joined the faculty of Case Western Reserve University in 1982, and was elevated to a full professorship in 1994. She was initially chair of the Department of Communication Studies, and later associate dean of the College of Arts and Sciences. In 1999, she joined the Medical University of South Carolina as dean of the College of Health Professions.

In July 2006, Ripich took office as president of the University of New England. As president, she oversaw the development of a new campus in Tangier, Morocco, and the openings of new colleges of pharmacy and dental medicine. Enrolment swelled from 4,000 students at the beginning of her tenure to 12,000 at the end. In May 2016, Ripich announced her intention to leave office in June 2017. Senators Susan Collins and Angus King issued a joint statement "thanking her for all that she has done to advance higher education in Maine".
