= Westbrook College =

Liberal arts college in Portland, Maine

- Type: Private
- Active: 1831 (195 years ago) – 1996 (30 years ago)
- Affiliations: Kennebec Association of Universalists
- Location: Portland, Maine, United States
- Campus: Suburban

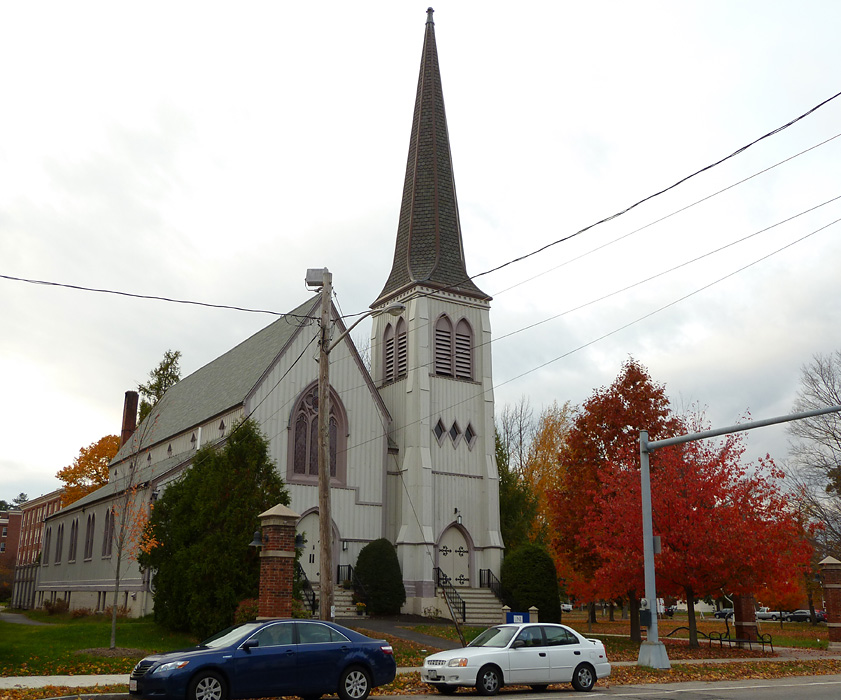
Ludcke Auditorium on the UNE Portland campus (formerly the Westbrook College campus).

Westbrook College was a liberal arts college in Portland, Maine, United States. Founded 1831 as Westbrook Seminary in Westbrook, Maine, it closed in 1996 and merged with the University of New England, which uses its old campus.

== History ==
In 1831, Westbrook Seminary was established by the Kennebec Association of Universalists in Westbrook, Maine. The original 8-acre property was a gift from Zachariah Stevens, for whom Steven's Plains and Stevens Avenue are named, and Oliver Buckley. The seminary building, now called Alumni Hall, was not finished until 1834, and the first classes were finally held after its completion. The four tracks of study included English, scientific, ladies' classical, and preparatory. It was co-educational, but women in the scientific or ladies' classical tracks received unique "laureate of arts" and "laureate of science" degrees upon completion.

Westbrook became an all-female institution when the last co-educational class graduated in 1925, and gradually became a junior college, as well, and dropped all preparatory work by 1933. During this time, it seems to have been named Westbrook Junior College. The women's junior-college plan had been proposed by president Clarence Quimby in 1914, but was rejected, and he later resigned in 1920. The college continued to grow through the 1970s, and the name was changed to Westbrook College. It became co-educational again in 1973, after the federal government stopped providing funds to gender-discriminating institutions. During the 1980s and 1990s, Westbrook made a commitment to a four-year liberal arts college education, but was hit hard by declining enrollment at the same time. By the mid-1990s, the college was seeking to close and merge with another institution, and finally did so with the University of New England in 1996. In an odd twist, the merger actually took place under the Westbrook charter, technically making the new institution Westbook College and changing its name to University of New England.

== Campus ==
Westbrook College was originally located in Westbrook, Maine, then Deering, Maine, and finally Portland, Maine. The institution never actually moved, but the surrounding area changed hands and names at least twice. Today, the area where the campus is located is known as Portland's Deering Center neighborhood.

The Westbrook College campus is now known by the University of New England as the UNE Portland Campus.

== Notable alumni and faculty ==
- Adin B. Capron, U.S. Congressman
- Emma Bedelia Dunham, poet
- Marion Coats Graves, president of the college in 1932
- John C. Hall, physician, Wisconsin state senator and Union Army doctor
- Seth Larrabee, attorney
- Edward A. Newman, businessman, general manager of Portland Railroad Company
- Lillian M. N. Stevens, temperance leader
