= Ted Alfond =

American businessman (born 1945)

- Born: 1945 (age 80–81)
- Education: Rollins College
- Occupation: Businessman
- Spouse: Barbara Lawrence
- Children: 3
- Father: Harold Alfond
- Family: Susan Alfond (sister); Bill Alfond (brother); Peter Alfond (brother)

Ted Alfond (born 1945) is an American billionaire businessman.

== Biography ==
Ted Alfond was born to a Jewish family, the son of Dorothy (née Levine) and Harold Alfond. His father founded the Dexter Shoe Company in 1958 and sold it in 1995 for $433 million of Berkshire Hathaway stock. When his father died in 2007, he left his shares in Berkshire Hathaway to his four children, Ted, Susan, Bill, and Peter, who are now all billionaires. In 1968, he graduated from Rollins College and after school, he worked as executive vice president of Dexter Shoe Company. He is a part owner of the Boston Red Sox.

== Personal life ==
Alfond is married to Barbara Lawrence whom he met in college; they have three children: John Alfond, Jenny Alfond Seeman, and Katharine Alfond Donahue. He lives in Weston, Massachusetts

== Net worth ==
Forbes estimates his net worth at US$2.5 billion (April 2023).
