= Bill Alfond =

American investor and philanthropist

William L. Alfond
- Born: 1949 (age 76–77)
- Education: Colby College; The Governor's Academy
- Occupations: investor, philanthropist
- Spouse: Joan Loring
- Children: 3
- Father: Harold Alfond
- Family: Susan Alfond (sister); Peter Alfond (brother); Ted Alfond (brother)

Bill Alfond (born 1949) is an American investor, philanthropist, and billionaire. In 2026, Forbes estimated his fortune at around $3.4 billion.

== Biography ==
Alfond was born to a Jewish family, the son of Dorothy (née Levine) and Harold Alfond. He graduated from Governor Dummer Academy (now The Governor's Academy) in 1967, where he now serves as a trustee. His father founded the Dexter Shoe Company in 1958 and sold it in 1995 for $433 million in Berkshire Hathaway stock. When his father died in 2007, he left his shares in Berkshire Hathaway to his four children, Ted, Susan, Bill, and Peter, who are now all billionaires.

Alfond was president of the bowling shoe division at Dexter Shoe Company until it was sold. He is currently a director of Dexter Enterprises LLC.

In 1986, he and his wife, Joan, founded the Bill and Joan Alfond Foundation.

== Personal life ==
Alfond is married to Joan Loring, who is also Jewish. They have three children: Justin Alfond, Kenden Alfond, and Reis Alfond. The couple lives in Belgrade, Maine.
