= University of New England (United States) =

Private research university in Portland and Biddeford, Maine, U.S.

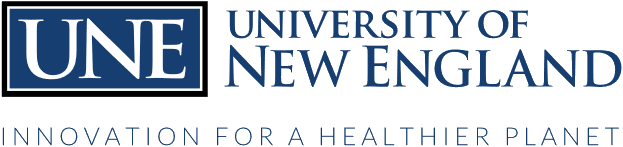
- Former names: As St. Francis College: College Séraphique (1939–1952); St. Francis College (1952–1978); As New England College of Osteopathic Medicine: New England College of Osteopathic Medicine (1978); As Westbrook College: Westbrook Seminary (1831–1933); Westbrook Junior College (1933–1973); Westbrook College (1973–1996)
- Motto: Lucens et ardens (Latin)
- Motto in English: "Ardor for light"
- Type: Private research university
- Established: 1831; 195 years ago
- Accreditation: NECHE
- Academic affiliations: UArctic; Space-grant
- Endowment: $451.1 million (2025)
- President: James D. Herbert
- Provost: Gwendolyn Mahon
- Faculty: 315 full-time, 248 part-time
- Administrative staff: 790
- Students: 5,924 (fall 2025)
- Undergraduates: 2,104 (fall 2025)
- Postgraduates: 2,323 (fall 2025)
- Doctoral students: 1,497 (fall 2025)
- Location: Biddeford, Maine, United States; 43°27′30″N 70°23′15″W
- Campus: 540 acres (2.2 km^{2}); Midsize Suburb
- Other campuses: Portland; Tangier
- Newspaper: Nor'easter News
- Colors: Black; Blue; Gray
- Nickname: Nor'easters
- Sporting affiliations: NCAA Division III - Commonwealth Coast; ECAC; NEISA
- Mascot: Stormin' Norman
- Website: une.edu

The University of New England (UNE) is a private research university in Biddeford, Maine, United States. The university has additional campuses in Portland, Maine, and Tangier, Morocco. It traces its historical origins to 1831, when Westbrook Seminary opened on what is now the Portland Campus for the Health Sciences.

UNE is the largest independent university in Maine and the largest educator of health care professionals for Maine. It is organized into seven colleges that combine to offer more than 80 undergraduate, graduate, online, and professional degrees. The university is classified among "R2: Doctoral Universities – High Research Activity" and New England's top institutions for student earning potential by the Carnegie Classification of Institutions of Higher Education.

== History ==
In 1939, a boys-only high school and junior college called the College Séraphique was founded in Biddeford by Father Decary and the Franciscan friar of St. Andre's parish. In 1952, the school changed its name to St. Francis College and began granting bachelor's degrees with state approval in 1953. The high school program was phased out by 1961, and the college was first accredited in 1966. The school became co-educational for the first time in 1967, and the Franciscans withdrew from the administration of the college in 1974.

To survive dropping enrollment, St. Francis College entered into an agreement with the New England Foundation for Osteopathic Medicine in 1978 to establish the New England College of Osteopathic Medicine on the same campus, and in 1979 the two together became the University of New England. The merger would not be fully complete until a 1987 vote by the College of Osteopathic Medicine corporation.

In 1996, Westbrook College merged with the University of New England. The merger took place under the terms of the original 1831 Westbrook charter, and the combined institutions became Westbrook College before changing the name to the University of New England.

James D. Herbert serves as UNE's sixth president. His tenure began on July 1, 2017, immediately following the 11-year tenure of Danielle N. Ripich.

In October 2020, the University of New England received a gift of $30 million from the Harold Alfond Foundation as part of a major investment in eight Maine institutions for the purpose of growing the state's workforce and economy and supporting quality health care. The grant supported the construction of a new facility for the relocation of the University's College of Osteopathic Medicine from the Biddeford campus to the Portland campus, the establishment of a new institute for Interprofessional Education and Practice, and the acceleration of high-growth undergraduate and graduate programs on the Biddeford campus to meet student demand and workforce needs, such as aquaculture, entrepreneurship, criminal justice, sports media communication, and others. In 2025, UNE opened the Harold and Bibby Alfond Center for Health Sciences, which now serves as a hub of medical and interprofessional education on UNE's Portland campus.

== Campuses ==
UNE offers three campuses that provide students with a range of learning environments. The university's two campuses in coastal Maine house undergraduate, graduate, and professional programs, while its Tangier Campus provides a semester-abroad opportunity in Morocco.

=== Biddeford campus ===
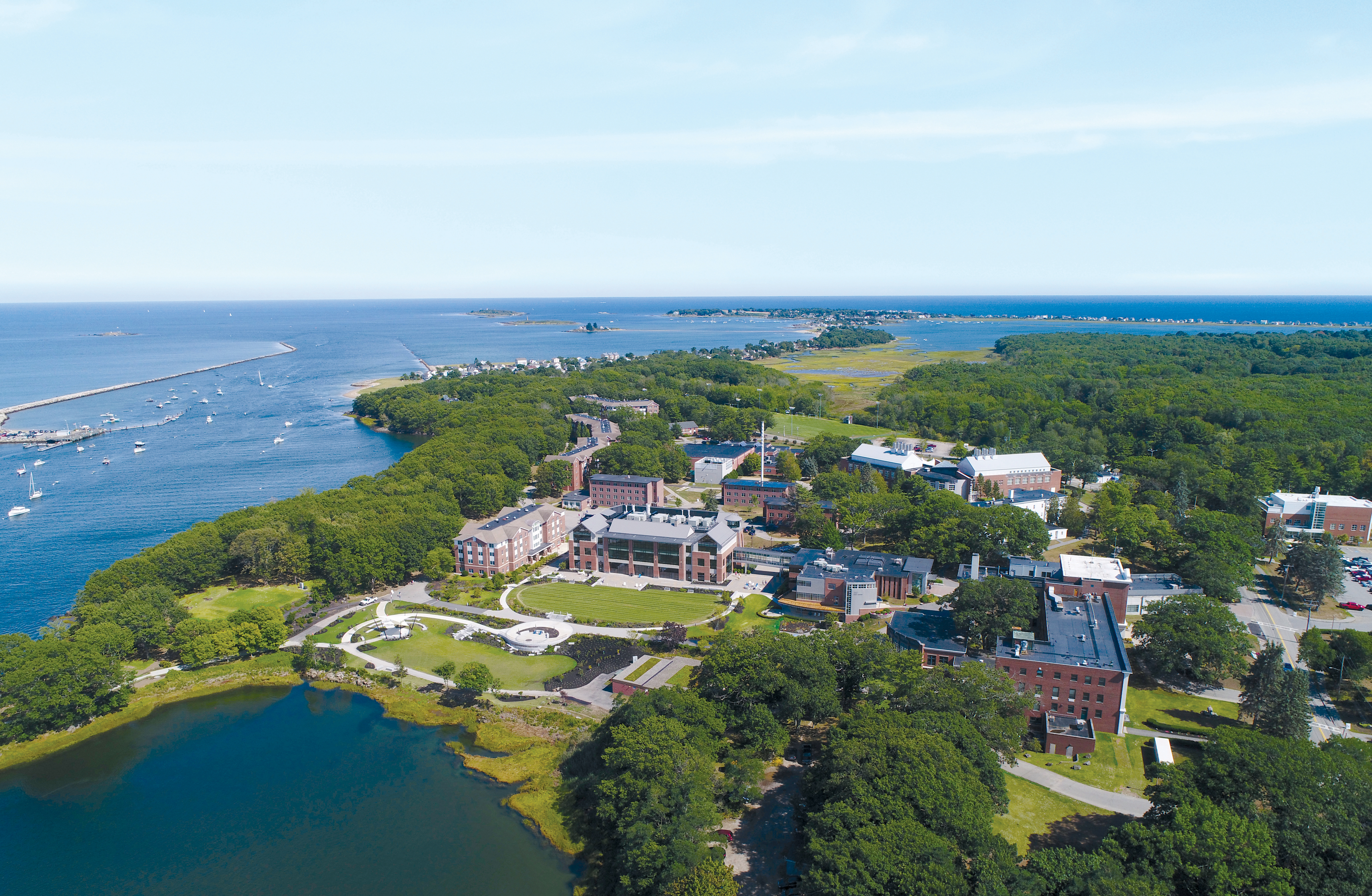
UNE Biddeford campus

The Biddeford campus covers 580 acres (230 ha), with 0.75 miles (1.21 km) of ocean frontage where the Saco River flows into the Atlantic Ocean. The 38 buildings on the campus include the Alfond Center for Arts and Sciences, the Pickus Center for Biomedical Research, and the Marine Science Center.

UNE's Biddeford Campus is also home to the George and Barbara Bush Center, which houses material chronicling the Bush family legacy in Maine, including memorabilia on loan from the George H. W. Bush Presidential Library and Museum. The Center includes a replica of the Oval Office during Bush's term in the White House and a statue of the former president. Each year, UNE hosts an annual lecture at its Biddeford campus that was often attended by the former president and his family. In September 2017, former U.S. Senate Majority Leader George J. Mitchell visited UNE's Biddeford campus to deliver the Bush Lecture.

The UNE Biddeford campus also includes the Harold Alfond Forum, which offers 105,000 square-feet (9,800 m2) of athletic and learning space, including: an NHL-size ice hockey rink with 900 seats, a basketball court with 1,200 seats, classrooms, a fitness center, and multi-purpose indoor practice courts that are also used for performances and lectures. A $10 million gift from the Harold Alfond Foundation facilitated the building's construction and the development of associated programming.

UNE also owns Ram Island, off the coast of the Biddeford campus, which was gifted to the university by Arthur P. Girard, a 2024 UNE honorary degree recipient and namesake of the Girard Marine Science Center in Biddeford and Girard Innovation Hall on UNE's Portland campus. The island serves as a research station and living laboratory for marine science education, supporting field courses, faculty research programs, and coastal ecosystem monitoring in Saco Bay.

=== Portland campus ===
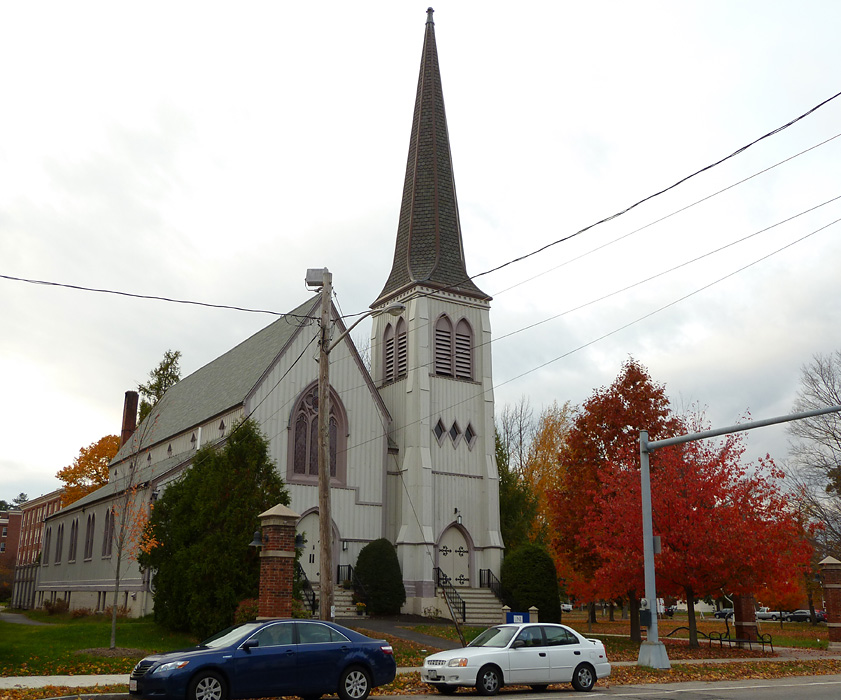
Ludcke Auditorium, Portland campus

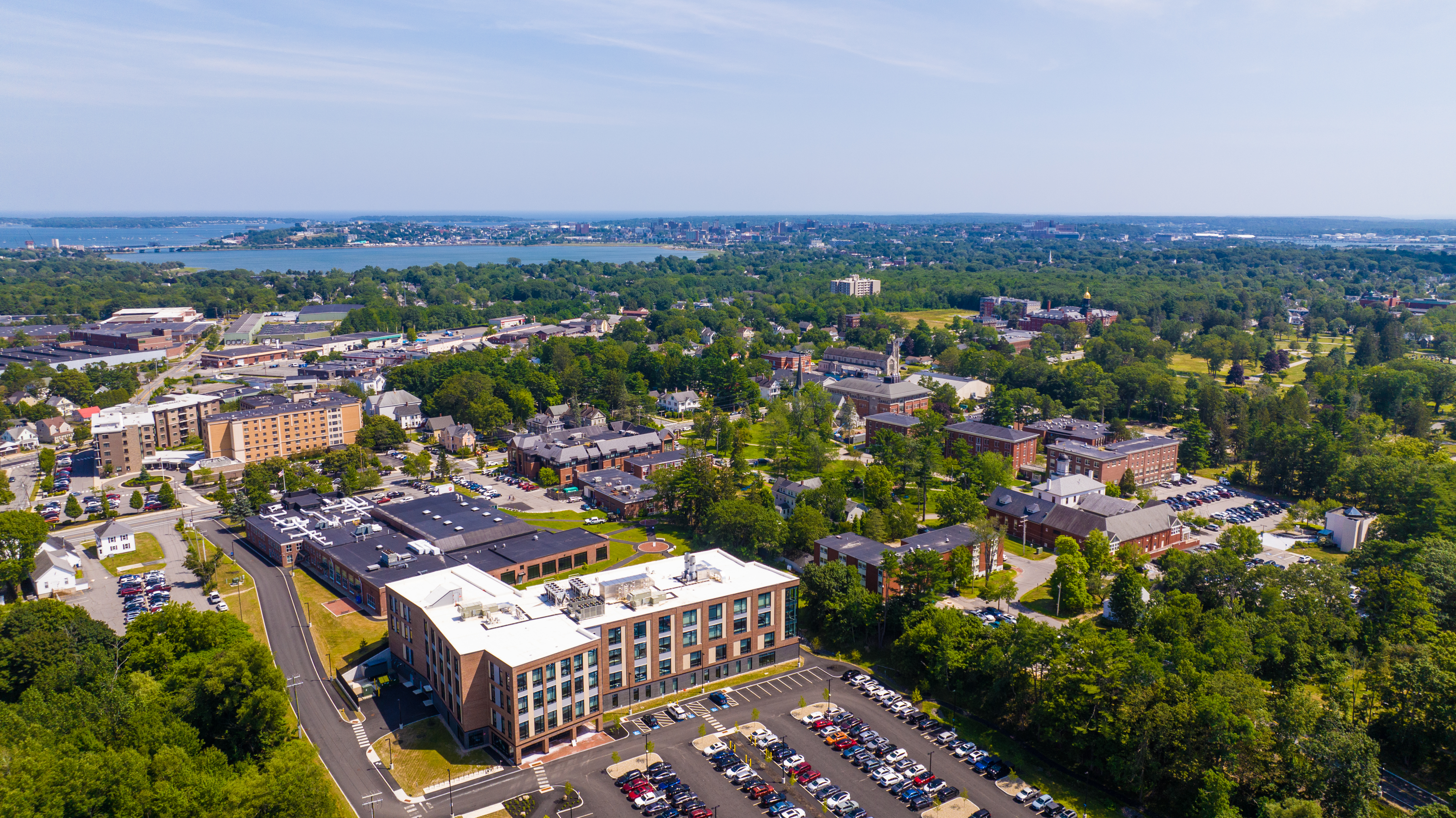
UNE Portland Campus for the Health Sciences

The UNE Portland Campus for the Health Sciences, on Stevens Avenue, houses the university's Westbrook College of Health Professions, College of Dental Medicine, College of Osteopathic Medicine, and College of Professional Studies (UNE Online).

The College of Dental Medicine, which is housed in the $14.5 million Oral Health Center, graduated its first class in 2017. It is Maine's only dental college.

In June 2025, the College of Osteopathic Medicine moved from Biddeford to the Portland campus. The 110,000-square-foot Harold and Bibby Alfond Center for Health Sciences houses the college and brings together all the university's health professions programs on a single integrated campus, supporting interprofessional health education. The College of Osteopathic Medicine is the only osteopathic medical school in New England.

Other features of the UNE Portland campus include the Art Gallery, the Maine Women Writers Collection, Alumni Hall, and the Center for Global Humanities. Alumni Hall is the oldest building on campus, dating to an original opening in 1834; its most recent renovation was completed in 2016. The Center for Global Humanities hosts scholars from around the globe for public lectures. Past lectures have featured Noam Chomsky, Sherwin Nuland, and Bill McKibben as speakers.

=== Tangier campus ===
In January 2014, UNE opened a campus in Tangier, Morocco, within the campus of the American School of Tangier. The UNE campus consists of two buildings, one for academic programming and the other for student and staff housing. It also includes an outdoor court colored UNE blue.

While studying in Morocco, UNE students take excursions to Casablanca, Fez, Marrakesh, and a UNE satellite program in Seville, Spain.

The UNE Tangier vampus also hosts the Tangier Global Forum, a public lecture series designed to facilitate discussion of issues facing the global community.

== Academics ==
UNE offers over fifty bachelor's degrees and over thirty graduate programs. The university also has Maine's only medical school and Maine's only dental school. It is accredited by the New England Commission of Higher Education.

=== College of Arts and Sciences ===
The UNE College of Arts and Sciences, located on the Biddeford campus, provides more than 40 undergraduate majors, 35 minors, and four master's programs in the humanities, arts, education, natural sciences, social sciences, and interdisciplinary studies. Research facilities include Morgane Hall, the Arthur P. Girard Marine Science Center, the Alfond Center for Arts and Sciences, and the Pickus Center for Biomedical Research. According to university data, 46% of UNE undergraduates participate in faculty-mentored research, and students study abroad at five times the national average.

=== College of Business ===
The UNE College of Business, located on the Biddeford campus, was established in June 2023. The college provides nine undergraduate majors, seven minors, and a Master of Business Administration program in business, economics, and management disciplines. Major programs include Business Administration, Marine Entrepreneurship, Outdoor Business and Innovation, Sport Leadership and Management, Finance, Marketing, and Accounting. The college's Business Administration and Sport Leadership and Management programs hold accreditation from the Accreditation Council for Business Schools and Programs (ACBSP). Facilities include Decary Hall, the P.D. Merrill Makerspace, and two specialized centers: Sales Excellence; Sport and Business Innovation.

=== College of Dental Medicine ===
The UNE College of Dental Medicine, established in 2013, is the only dental school in Maine and northern New England. The college enrolls approximately 70 students per class in its four-year Doctor of Dental Medicine (D.M.D.) program and offers an advanced standing track for foreign-trained dentists. The college operates four academic departments: Clinical Comprehensive Care; Diagnostic, Surgical, and Integrated Sciences; Preventative, Pediatric, and Community Dentistry; and Restorative and Clinical Sciences. Students provide patient care at UNE's Oral Health Center teaching clinic on the Portland Campus for the Health Sciences, where a third of patients are covered by MaineCare insurance. Fourth-year students complete semester-long externship rotations in private practices, Federally Qualified Health Centers, and nonprofit clinics throughout Maine, Vermont, New Hampshire, Massachusetts, and Rhode Island.

=== College of Professional Studies (UNE Online) ===
The UNE College of Professional Studies is 100% online, offering graduate degrees and certificate programs. In 2015, the college enrolled students from all 50 U.S. states and 27 countries.

=== College of Osteopathic Medicine ===
The University of New England College of Osteopathic Medicine, founded in 1978, is the only medical school in the state of Maine and confers the Doctor of Osteopathic Medicine (D.O.) degree. UNE COM also offers a Master of Science in Clinical Anatomy degree with tracks in teaching, research, and medical school preparation. More than 70 percent of graduates practice in underserved areas, two-thirds practice in primary care. Its graduates constitute 25 percent of primary care physicians practicing in rural parts of Maine, and 10 percent of practicing physicians in the state. The college is accredited by the Commission on Osteopathic College Accreditation (COCA) and the Commission on Institutions of Higher Education of the New England Association of Schools and Colleges. The college's Department of Continuing Medical Education holds dual accreditation with the American Osteopathic Association and the Maine Medical Association.

=== Honors College ===
The UNE Honors College is a selective college that accepts approximately 30 high-performing first-year students annually from all academic majors. Established in 2023, the program offers dedicated housing, early class registration, scholarships up to $1,000 annually, research stipends up to $2,000, and specialized seminars. Admission requires no separate application and is based on high school academic performance, extracurricular activities, and application materials.

=== Westbrook College of Health Professions ===
The UNE Westbrook College of Health Professions prepares students for careers in the health care fields on the Biddeford and Portland campuses. Students participate in clinical simulations, interprofessional learning experiences, service learning, and other experiences that enable them to transition smoothly into the workforce upon graduation. The college offers undergraduate degrees in applied exercise science, dental hygiene, nursing, nutrition, occupational studies, public health, and social work. Graduate programs include master's degrees in athletic training, occupational therapy, and Physician Associate, and doctoral programs in nurse anesthesia, Doctor of Pharmacy, and Doctor of Physical Therapy. According to UNE, over 26 percent of health professions graduates from the past decade are licensed to practice in Maine.

=== Research and Centers of Excellence ===
The University of New England is categorized as an R2 University by the Carnegie Classification of Institutions of Higher Education, which indicates that the institution engages in "High Research Activity." UNE has several centers of excellence for research and scholarship.

=== Rankings ===
UNE's programs have received national and international recognition in recent years:

- Princeton Review ranked UNE in "The Best 386 Colleges" 2021 edition.
- UNE was ranked #285 in the 2023 U.S. News & World Report Best Colleges Ranking
- Forbes ranked UNE #452 in its list of "America's Top Colleges for 2019."
- In 2017, The Wall Street Journal/Times Higher Education ranked UNE 325th among U.S. colleges and universities.
- In 2015, the Brookings Institution ranked UNE second among Maine universities and colleges for its ability to increase students' career earnings.

=== International collaboration ===
UNE is an active member of the University of the Arctic. UArctic is an international cooperative network based in the Circumpolar Arctic region, consisting of more than 200 universities, colleges, and other organizations with an interest in promoting education and research in the Arctic region.

The university also participates in UArctic's mobility program north2north. The aim of that program is to enable students of member institutions to study in different parts of the North.

== Athletics ==
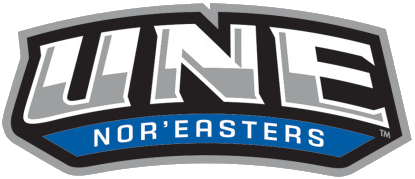
UNE Nor'easters wordmark

University of New England teams (nicknamed the Nor'easters) participate as members of the National Collegiate Athletic Association's Division III. The Nor'easters are a member of the Conference of New England for thirteen of the school's current varsity sports; for women's ice hockey, the Nor'easters belong to the Conference of New England.

Men's sports include basketball, cross country, golf, ice hockey, lacrosse, and soccer. Women's sports include basketball, cross country, field hockey, ice hockey, lacrosse, rugby, soccer, softball, swimming, and volleyball. In 2017, UNE fielded a sub-varsity football team in preparation for 2018 when it became a varsity football member of the CCC's football-only arm of Commonwealth Coast Football.

== Notable alumni ==
- Marshall Archer, politician
- Bernard Ayotte, politician
- Peter Alan Bell, osteopathic physician
- Michael F. Brennan, politician
- Deqa Dhalac, politician
- William Diamond, politician
- Kelsey Earley, beauty pageant titleholder
- Caty Flagg, ice hockey player
- Lori Gramlich, politician
- Paul Janeczko, poet and anthologist
- David F. Levine, author and biomedical scientist
- Peter Makuck, poet
- Donald Pilon, politician
- Charlotte Warren, politician
- Justina Wilhelm, academic administrator and social worker
