= Harold Alfond =

American businessman

- Born: March 6, 1914; Swampscott, Massachusetts, U.S.
- Died: November 16, 2007 (aged 93); Belgrade, Maine, U.S.
- Occupations: Founder of Dexter Shoe Company and philanthropist
- Known for: First factory outlet store
- Spouse: Dorothy Levine (m. 1943; died 2005)
- Children: Ted Alfond; Susan Alfond; Bill Alfond; Peter Alfond
- Relatives: Justin Alfond (grandson)

Harold Alfond (March 6, 1914 – November 16, 2007) was an American businessman who founded the Dexter Shoe Company, established the first factory outlet store and was a minority owner of the Boston Red Sox.

== Early life ==
Alfond was born in Swampscott, Massachusetts, on March 6, 1914, the son of Russian immigrants Simon and Rose Alfond. Harold, his brother David, and four sisters, Anne, Bertha, Gladys and Grace, grew up in Swampscott and attended Swampscott schools. In high school, Harold was an outstanding athlete and developed his passion for sports.

== Founding Dexter Shoes ==
After graduating from high school in 1934, Alfond got a job at Kesslen Shoe Company in Kennebunk, Maine, where his father worked. In a short time, he rose from odd shoe boy to factory superintendent. In 1940, Alfond and his father bought a shoe factory in Norridgewock, Maine, and founded Norrwock Shoe Company. They sold the company to Shoe Corp. of America for $1 million in 1944 and Simon Alfond stayed on as president for 25 years.

In 1958, Alfond left, purchased an old woolen mill in Dexter, Maine, and founded Dexter Shoe Company. There, he produced shoes for the private label catalog market, supplying stores such as Sears, JC Penney, Spiegel, and Montgomery Ward & Co. Although Dexter was successful from the beginning, Alfond tired of being controlled by a few large customers and decided to go into the "branded" business. He developed a line of shoes under the Dexter name, hired a sales force and began selling to independent shoe stores across the country.

Alfond is often credited with the invention of the factory outlet store, having opened a shop at one of Dexter’s plants in 1971. Because factories make mistakes, not all shoes pass quality control; these products are called factory seconds. The practice in the industry was to sell these shoes to jobbers for about a dollar a pair, who would then resell them for five times their cost. Alfond thought that was a pretty good mark-up, so in the 1960s he opened an outlet store at Dexter's Skowhegan factory and started selling his own factory seconds. Soon, the factories weren't making enough mistakes to supply the store, so Harold decided to put in stale inventory (first grade shoes that weren't selling in the wholesale market). This worked so well that Dexter's log-cabin-style outlet stores started appearing on all the heavily traveled roads throughout New England. Other manufacturers caught on to the idea and as Dexter put up new stores, other manufacturers would open their outlets next door. By the 1990s, the Dexter Factory Outlet chain had expanded to over 80 stores. About this time, Dexter also stopped building freestanding log cabins and began leasing stores in outlet malls.

Dexter continued to grow rapidly throughout the 1970s and 1980s and from time to time, corporate suitors came calling to see whether they could entice Dexter into a marriage. Many were national retail chains that promised rapid expansion, but would emphasize foreign production and likely, a departure from Dexter's family style of running the business. Alfond eventually decided to sell to Berkshire Hathaway, with an agreement to not interfere with the family's continued management of the business. In 1993, Dexter and its affiliates, Pan Am Shoe and Ocsap Ltd., were sold for $433 million in stock; eight years later Warren Buffett decided to fold Dexter into another business, H.H. Brown, characterizing the purchase in 2008 as "the worst deal that I've made." Alfond had remained as President of Dexter until it merged with H.H. Brown.

== Philanthropy ==
In order to coordinate his charitable giving, the 36-year-old Alfond organized the first private foundation in the state of Maine, the Harold Alfond Foundation. Between 1950 and 2003, the foundation has contributed more than $100 million to charitable causes, and as of 2008 had over $106 million in assets.

He has donated money to various institutions of learning to help improve their sports facilities; for example, the Alfond Arena and Alfond Stadium at the University of Maine, the Harold and Ted Alfond Sports Center at Rollins College, the Harold Alfond Center for Health Sciences and the Alfond Forum at the University of New England, the Harold Alfond Management Center at the University of Massachusetts Amherst's Isenberg School, and the Alfond Center at Saint Joseph's College of Maine. In 1999, the University of Maine honored Alford with a bronze statue that was installed on its campus in his honor. In December 2003, five years after his $1.65-million donation for the athletic and recreation center, Alfond contributed $1 million to St. Joseph's towards the $10 million needed to build Alfond Hall, the college's primary academic hall.

In 2020, construction of the 350,000-square-foot Harold Alfond Athletics and Recreation Center at Colby College was finished. Funding was led by a cornerstone $80 million gift from the Harold Alfond Foundation.

Harold Alfond and the Alfond Foundation have also been major supporters of Kents Hill School in Readfield, Maine. Kents Hill opened the Alfond Athletics Center in 2001 and the Alfond Athletic Fields - the largest turf complex in New England - in 2008 after receiving substantial gifts. In 2011, Kents Hill received a $2.3 million gift for the construction of its Akin Learning Center. Most recently in 2015, the school received a $3.5 million matching grant for the construction of a new dining hall.

In 2007, having lived with cancer for 17 years, Alfond donated $7 million to a cancer care center at MaineGeneral Medical Center in Augusta. The center is named the Harold Alfond Center for Cancer Care.

The Alfond Scholarship Foundation introduced the "Harold Alfond College Challenge" in January 2009. Through the program, a $500 grant is given to every Maine resident who is enrolled before his or her first birthday; the money is intended to help Maine families plan for education beyond high school. As of December, 2024, the Alfond Grant program and its partners have invested over half a billion dollars since 2013 for the future education of more than 164,000 Maine children.

== Investments in sports ==
In addition to his donations to colleges for improvements to their sports facilities, Alfond demonstrated his support of sports in other ways.

In 1978, a group purchasing the Boston Red Sox was looking for a Maine sportsman to join them. Alfond was the obvious choice and ever since Dexter has been a limited partner in the franchise. When Dexter was sold to Berkshire Hathaway in 1993, the Alfond family retained its stake in the team, a stake that remains in the hands of two of his sons.

In the 1980s, Alfond helped sponsor Kevin Mahaney in the sailor's effort to compete in the Olympics. Mahaney later earned a silver medal in sailing at the 1992 Summer Olympics.

Along with other investors, Alfond helped create Belgrade Lakes Golf Club, a course close to his summer home. The club has been recognized as among the best public golf courses in the country. In 2002, Golf Digest recognized the course as the only five-star public golf course in the Northeast.

== Family life ==
In 1943, Alfond married Dorothy Levine, who was also Jewish; they raised four children: Ted, Susan, Bill, and Peter who grew to provide them with thirteen grandchildren. His wife died in December 2005.

One of the grandsons, Justin Alfond, was elected to the Maine Senate in 2008, and was elected Senate President in 2012.

== Death ==
Alfond died of prostate cancer on November 16, 2007, in Belgrade, Maine.
