= 2014 Maine Senate election =

- November 4, 2014

All 35 seats in the Maine Senate 18 seats needed for a majority

	Majority party	Minority party
Leader	Michael Thibodeau (redistricted)	Justin Alfond (redistricted)
Party	Republican	Democratic
Leader since	December 5, 2012	December 5, 2012
Leader's seat	District 23	District 8
Last election	15	20 (Note: Includes one Independent who caucused with the Democrats.)
Seats after	20	15
Seat change	▲5	▼5
President of the Senate before election
Justin Alfond
Democratic
Elected President of the Senate
Michael Thibodeau
Republican

The 2014 Maine Senate election was held on November 4, 2014, to determine which party would control the Maine Senate for the following two years in the 127th Maine Legislature. All 35 seats in the Maine Senate were up for election and the primary was held on June 10, 2014. Prior to the election, 19 seats were held by Democrats, with one Independent caucusing with them, and 15 seats were held by Republicans. The general election saw Republicans flip five seats, thereby regaining their majority in the State Senate that they had lost following the 2012 election.

== Predictions ==
Source	Ranking	As of
Governing	Lean D	October 20, 2014

== Retirements ==
=== Independents ===
1. District 11: Richard G. Woodbury retired.

=== Democrats ===
1. District 16: Margaret Craven retired.
2. District 22: Edward Mazurek retired.
3. District 30: Emily Cain retired to unsuccessfully run for Maine's 2nd congressional district.
4. District 35: Troy Jackson retired to unsuccessfully run for Maine's 2nd congressional district.

=== Republicans ===
1. District 12: Gary Plummer retired.
2. District 21: Patrick Flood retired.
3. District 34: Roger Sherman was term-limited.

== Incumbents defeated ==
=== In primary ===
==== Republicans ====
1. District 4: Douglas Thomas lost renomination to Paul Davis.

=== In general ===
==== Democrats ====
1. District 16: Colleen Machowicz lost re-election to Scott Cyrway.
2. District 20: John Cleveland lost re-election to Eric Brakey.
3. District 23: Eloise Vitelli lost re-election to Linda Baker.
4. District 30: James Boyle lost re-election to Amy Volk.
5. District 33: John Tuttle lost re-election to David Woodsome.

== Closest races ==
Seats where the margin of victory was under 10%:

1. District 25, 0.14%
2. District 21, 0.62% (gain)
3. District 11, 0.74%
4. District 2, 1.54%
5. District 13, 1.86%
6. District 12, 4.14% (gain)
7. District 23, 5.44% (gain)
8. District 1, 5.50% (gain)
9. District 30, 5.94% (gain)
10. District 9, 6.06%
11. District 18, 8.44%

== Results ==
=== District 1 ===
District 1 election, 2014
Party	Candidate	Votes	%
Republican	Peter Edgecomb	7,935	52.75%
Democratic	Charles Theriault	7,107	47.25%
Total votes		15,042	100.0%
Republican gain from Democratic			

=== District 2 ===
District 2 election, 2014
Party	Candidate	Votes	%
Republican	Michael Willette	7,626	50.77%
Democratic	Michael E. Carpenter	7,394	49.23%
Total votes		15,020	100.0%
Republican hold			

=== District 3 ===
District 3 election, 2014
Party	Candidate	Votes	%
Republican	Rodney Whittemore (incumbent)	10,103	66.88%
Democratic	Craig Heavey	5,004	33.12%
Total votes		15,107	100.0%
Republican hold			

=== District 4 ===
District 4 election, 2014
Party	Candidate	Votes	%
Republican	Paul Davis	11,615	75.33%
Democratic	David Ziemer	3,804	24.67%
Total votes		15,419	100.0%
Republican hold			

=== District 5 ===
District 5 election, 2014
Party	Candidate	Votes	%
Democratic	James Dill	8,638	58.80%
Republican	Mitchell McLaughlin	6,052	41.20%
Total votes		14,690	100.0%
Democratic hold			

=== District 6 ===
District 6 election, 2014
Party	Candidate	Votes	%
Republican	David C. Burns (incumbent)	8,474	55.49%
Democratic	Anne C. Perry	6,796	44.51%
Total votes		15,270	100.0%
Republican hold			

=== District 7 ===
District 7 election, 2014
Party	Candidate	Votes	%
Republican	Brian Langley (incumbent)	10,384	55.11%
Democratic	Theodore Koffman	8,458	44.89%
Total votes		18,842	100.0%
Republican hold			

=== District 8 ===
District 8 election, 2014
Party	Candidate	Votes	%
Republican	Kimberley Rosen	9,671	56.10%
Democratic	Paul P. Davis	7,569	43.90%
Total votes		17,240	100.0%
Republican hold			

=== District 9 ===
District 9 election, 2014
Party	Candidate	Votes	%
Democratic	Geoffrey Gratwick (incumbent)	7,538	53.03%
Republican	Cary Weston	6,677	46.97%
Total votes		14,215	100.0%
Democratic hold			

=== District 10 ===
District 10 election, 2014
Party	Candidate	Votes	%
Republican	Andre Cushing III (incumbent)	10,434	69.42%
Democratic	Jarric Fontaine	4,597	30.58%
Total votes		15,031	100.0%
Republican hold			

=== District 11 ===
District 11 election, 2014
Party	Candidate	Votes	%
Republican	Michael Thibodeau (incumbent)	9,109	50.37%
Democratic	Jonathon Fulford	8,974	49.63%
Total votes		18,083	100.0%
Republican hold			

=== District 12 ===
District 12 election, 2014
Party	Candidate	Votes	%
Democratic	David Miramant	9,162	52.07%
Republican	Paula Sutton	8,434	47.93%
Total votes		17,596	100.0%
Democratic gain from Republican			

=== District 13 ===
District 13 election, 2014
Party	Candidate	Votes	%
Democratic	Chris Johnson (incumbent)	9,492	50.93%
Republican	Leslie Fossel	9,146	49.07%
Total votes		18,638	100.0%
Democratic hold			

=== District 14 ===
District 14 election, 2014
Party	Candidate	Votes	%
Republican	Earle McCormick	9,741	52.75%
Democratic	David Bustin	7,219	39.10%
Independent	Gary Quintal	1,504	8.15%
Total votes		18,464	100.0%
Republican gain from Democratic			

=== District 15 ===
District 15 election, 2014
Party	Candidate	Votes	%
Republican	Roger Katz (incumbent)	11,938	72.18%
Democratic	Rebecca Cornell du Houx	4,600	27.82%
Total votes		16,538	100.0%
Republican hold			

=== District 16 ===
District 16 election, 2014
Party	Candidate	Votes	%
Republican	Scott Cyrway	8,523	55.13%
Democratic	Colleen Machowicz (incumbent)	6,936	44.87%
Total votes		15,459	100.0%
Republican gain from Democratic			

=== District 17 ===
District 17 election, 2014
Party	Candidate	Votes	%
Republican	Thomas Saviello (incumbent)	12,529	72.01%
Democratic	Joanne Dunlap	4,869	27.99%
Total votes		17,398	100.0%
Republican hold			

=== District 18 ===
District 18 election, 2014
Party	Candidate	Votes	%
Democratic	John Patrick (incumbent)	9,136	54.22%
Republican	Joseph Martin	7,714	45.78%
Total votes		16,850	100.0%
Democratic hold			

=== District 19 ===
District 19 election, 2014
Party	Candidate	Votes	%
Republican	James Hamper (incumbent)	10,386	62.49%
Democratic	Rose Roger-Wells	6,234	37.51%
Total votes		16,620	100.0%
Republican hold			

=== District 20 ===
District 20 election, 2014
Party	Candidate	Votes	%
Republican	Eric Brakey	10,138	58.66%
Democratic	John Cleveland (incumbent)	7,144	41.34%
Total votes		17,282	100.0%
Republican gain from Democratic			

=== District 21 ===
District 21 election, 2014
Party	Candidate	Votes	%
Democratic	Nathan Libby	6,646	50.31%
Republican	Patrica Gagne	6,563	49.69%
Total votes		13,209	100.0%
Democratic gain from Republican			

=== District 22 ===
District 22 election, 2014
Party	Candidate	Votes	%
Republican	Garrett Mason (incumbent)	9,633	57.01%
Democratic	Guy Desjardins	7,264	42.99%
Total votes		16,897	100.0%
Republican hold			

=== District 23 ===
District 23 election, 2014
Party	Candidate	Votes	%
Republican	Linda Baker	8,916	46.83%
Democratic	Eloise Vitelli (incumbent)	7,880	41.39%
Green	Alice Knapp	2,243	11.78%
Total votes		19,039	100.0%
Republican gain from Democratic			

=== District 24 ===
District 24 election, 2014
Party	Candidate	Votes	%
Democratic	Stanley Gerzofsky (incumbent)	9,779	48.34%
Republican	Jennifer Johnson	6,933	34.27%
Green	Fred Horch	3,518	17.39%
Total votes		20,230	100.0%
Democratic hold			

=== District 25 ===
District 25 election, 2014 (Note: Due to the close nature of these election results, Republican nominee Cathy Manchester requested a recount. The recount was held on November 18 and reversed the outcome of the race, with Manchester at 10,927 votes and Breen at 10,916. Manchester was provisionally seated by the Senate on December 3, however Democrats objected to the recount results and on December 9, a Senate committee inspection revealed that the 21 ballots for Manchester were mistakenly counted twice. Upon this rectification, Manchester resigned and Breen was certified the winner.)
Party	Candidate	Votes	%
Democratic	Cathy Breen	10,930	50.07%
Republican	Cathy Manchester	10,898	49.93%
Total votes		21,828	100.0%
Democratic hold			

=== District 26 ===
District 26 election, 2014
Party	Candidate	Votes	%
Democratic	William Diamond	10,389	63.05%
Republican	Kalie Warren	6,087	36.95%
Total votes		16,476	100.0%
Democratic gain from Republican			

=== District 27 ===
District 27 election, 2014
Party	Candidate	Votes	%
Democratic	Justin Alfond (incumbent)	11,376	67.55%
Green	Asher Platts	2,852	16.94%
Republican	Peter Doyle	2,612	15.51%
Total votes		16,840	100.0%
Democratic hold			

=== District 28 ===
District 28 election, 2014
Party	Candidate	Votes	%
Democratic	Anne Haskel (incumbent)	11,934	74.04%
Green	Owen Hill	4,185	25.96%
Total votes		16,119	100.0%
Democratic hold			

=== District 29 ===
District 29 election, 2014
Party	Candidate	Votes	%
Democratic	Rebecca Millett (incumbent)	9,926	53.58%
Republican	William DeSena	6,527	35.23%
Green	Mark Diehl	2,073	11.19%
Total votes		18,526	100.0%
Democratic hold			

=== District 30 ===
District 30 election, 2014
Party	Candidate	Votes	%
Republican	Amy Volk	10,295	52.97%
Democratic	James Boyle (incumbent)	9,139	47.03%
Total votes		19,434	100.0%
Republican gain from Democratic			

=== District 31 ===
District 31 election, 2014
Party	Candidate	Votes	%
Democratic	Linda Valentino (incumbent)	9,785	59.70%
Republican	Michael Coleman	6,604	40.30%
Total votes		16,389	100.0%
Democratic hold			

=== District 32 ===
District 32 election, 2014
Party	Candidate	Votes	%
Democratic	David Dutremble (incumbent)	8,740	55.29%
Republican	James Booth	7,067	44.71%
Total votes		15,807	100.0%
Democratic hold			

=== District 33 ===
District 33 election, 2014
Party	Candidate	Votes	%
Republican	David Woodsome	8,736	59.15%
Democratic	John Tuttle (incumbent)	6,033	40.85%
Total votes		14,769	100.0%
Republican gain from Democratic			

=== District 34 ===
District 34 election, 2014
Party	Candidate	Votes	%
Republican	Ronald F. Collins (incumbent)	8,523	48.90%
Democratic	Gary Connor	6,600	37.87%
Maine Families Party	Richard Burns	2,305	13.23%
Total votes		17,428	100.0%
Republican hold			

=== District 35 ===
District 35 election, 2014
Party	Candidate	Votes	%
Democratic	Dawn Hill (incumbent)	10,701	59.97%
Republican	John Carson	7,142	40.03%
Total votes		17,843	100.0%
Democratic hold			
