= 127th Maine Senate =

2015 to 2016 legislative session

The 127th Maine Senate had 35 members each elected to two-year terms in November 2014. The first regular session was sworn in on December 3, 2014.

The 127th Senate party composition was:

- 20 Republicans
- 15 Democrats

== Leadership ==
Position	Name	Party	Residence
President	Michael Thibodeau	Republican	Winterport
Majority Leader	Garrett Mason	Republican	Lisbon
Assistant Majority Leader	Andre Cushing III	Republican	Hampden
Minority Leader	Justin Alfond	Democrat	Portland
Assistant Minority Leader	Dawn Hill	Democrat	York

== Senators ==
District	Senator	Party	Residence
1	Peter Edgecomb	Republican	Caribou
2	Michael Willette	Republican	Presque Isle
3	Rodney Whittemore	Republican	Skowhegan
4	Paul T. Davis	Republican	Sangerville
5	James Dill	Democrat	Old Town
6	David C. Burns	Republican	Whiting
7	Brian Langley	Republican	Ellsworth
8	Kimberly Rosen	Republican	Bucksport
9	Geoffrey Gratwick	Democrat	Bangor
10	Andre Cushing III	Republican	Hampden
11	Michael Thibodeau	Republican	Winterport
12	David Miramant	Democrat	Camden
13	Christopher Johnson	Democrat	Somerville
14	Earle McCormick	Republican	West Gardiner
15	Roger Katz	Republican	Augusta
16	Scott Cyrway	Republican	Benton
17	Tom Saviello	Republican	Wilton
18	John L. Patrick	Republican	Rumford
19	James Hamper	Republican	Oxford
20	Eric Brakey	Republican	Auburn
21	Nate Libby	Democrat	Lewiston
22	Garrett Mason	Republican	Lisbon
23	Linda Baker	Republican	Topsham
24	Stanley Gerzofsky	Democrat	Brunswick
25	Cathy Breen	Democrat	Falmouth
26	G. William Diamond	Democrat	Windham
27	Justin Alfond	Democrat	Portland
28	Anne Haskell	Democrat	Portland
29	Rebecca Millett	Democrat	Cape Elizbath
30	Amy Volk	Republican	Scarborough
31	Linda Valentino	Democrat	Saco
32	David Dutremble	Democrat	Biddeford
33	David Woodsome	Republican	Waterboro
34	Ronald F. Collins	Republican	Wells
35	Dawn Hill	Democrat	York

== See also ==
- List of Maine State Senators
- List of Maine state legislatures
