= Maine's 22nd State Senate district =

Maine state legislative district

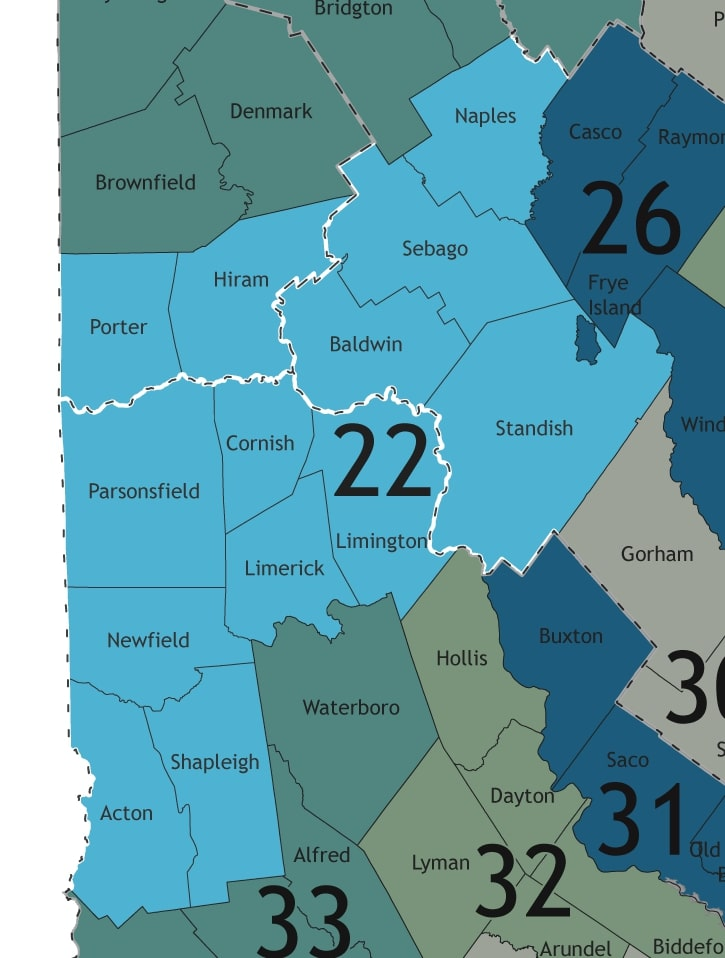
Senator
| James Libby; R–Standish |
- Population (2020): 39,178

Maine's 22nd State Senate district is one of 35 districts in the Maine Senate. It has been represented by Republican James Libby since 2022.

== Geography ==
District 22 includes portions of the counties of Cumberland and York. The district also includes the towns of Hiram and Porter of Oxford County. The district lies on the border between Maine and New Hampshire.

Cumberland County - 5.8% of county

Oxford County - 5.6% of county

York County = 7.6% of county

Cumberland:

Towns:

- Baldwin
- Naples
- Sebago
- Standish

Oxford:

Towns:

- Hiram
- Porter

York:

Towns:

- Acton
- Cornish
- Limerick
- Limington
- Newfield
- Parsonsfield
- Shapleigh

== Recent election results ==
=== 2022 ===
2022 Maine State Senate election, District 22
| Party | Candidate | Votes | % |
|---|---|---|---|
| Republican | James Libby | 11,334 | 60.3 |
| Democratic | Michael McKinney | 7,463 | 39.7 |
| Total votes | | 18,797 | 100.0 |
| Republican hold | | | |

Elections prior to 2022 were held under different district lines.

=== 2024 ===
2024 Maine State Senate election, District 22
| Party | Candidate | Votes | % |
|---|---|---|---|
| Republican | James Libby | 14,838 | 63.6 |
| Democratic | Anne McMahon | 8,501 | 36.4 |
| Total votes | | 23,339 | 100.0 |
| Republican hold | | | |

== Historical election results ==
=== 2012 ===
2012 Maine State Senate election, District 22
| Party | Candidate | Votes | % |
|---|---|---|---|
| Democratic | Edward Mazurek | 10,535 | 53.9 |
| Republican | Christopher Rector | 9,142 | 46.1 |
| Total votes | | 19,677 | 100 |
| Democratic gain from Republican | | | |

=== 2014 ===
Note: (Note: This election was a Republican hold, as Mason had been redistricted from the 17th district in early 2014)

2014 Maine State Senate election, District 22
| Party | Candidate | Votes | % |
|---|---|---|---|
| Republican | Garrett Mason | 9,633 | 54.3 |
| Democratic | Guy Desjardins | 7,264 | 40.9 |
| Blank votes | None | 847 | 4.8 |
| Total votes | | 17,950 | 100 |
| Republican hold | | | |

=== 2016 ===
2016 Maine State Senate election, District 22
| Party | Candidate | Votes | % |
|---|---|---|---|
| Republican | Garrett Mason | 13,774 | 67 |
| Democratic | Kimberly Sampson | 6,777 | 33 |
| Total votes | | 20,551 | 100 |
| Republican hold | | | |

=== 2018 ===
2018 Maine State Senate election, District 22
| Party | Candidate | Votes | % |
|---|---|---|---|
| Republican | Jeffrey Timberlake | 10,572 | 62.7 |
| Democratic | Lois Kelby-Chesley | 6,277 | 37.3 |
| Total votes | | 16,849 | 100 |
| Republican hold | | | |

=== 2020 ===
2020 Maine State Senate election, District 22
| Party | Candidate | Votes | % |
|---|---|---|---|
| Republican | Jeffrey Timberlake | 13,270 | 60.6 |
| Democratic | Martha Poliquin | 8,610 | 39.4 |
| Total votes | | 21,880 | 100 |
| Republican hold | | | |
