= Maine's 19th State Senate district =

American legislative district

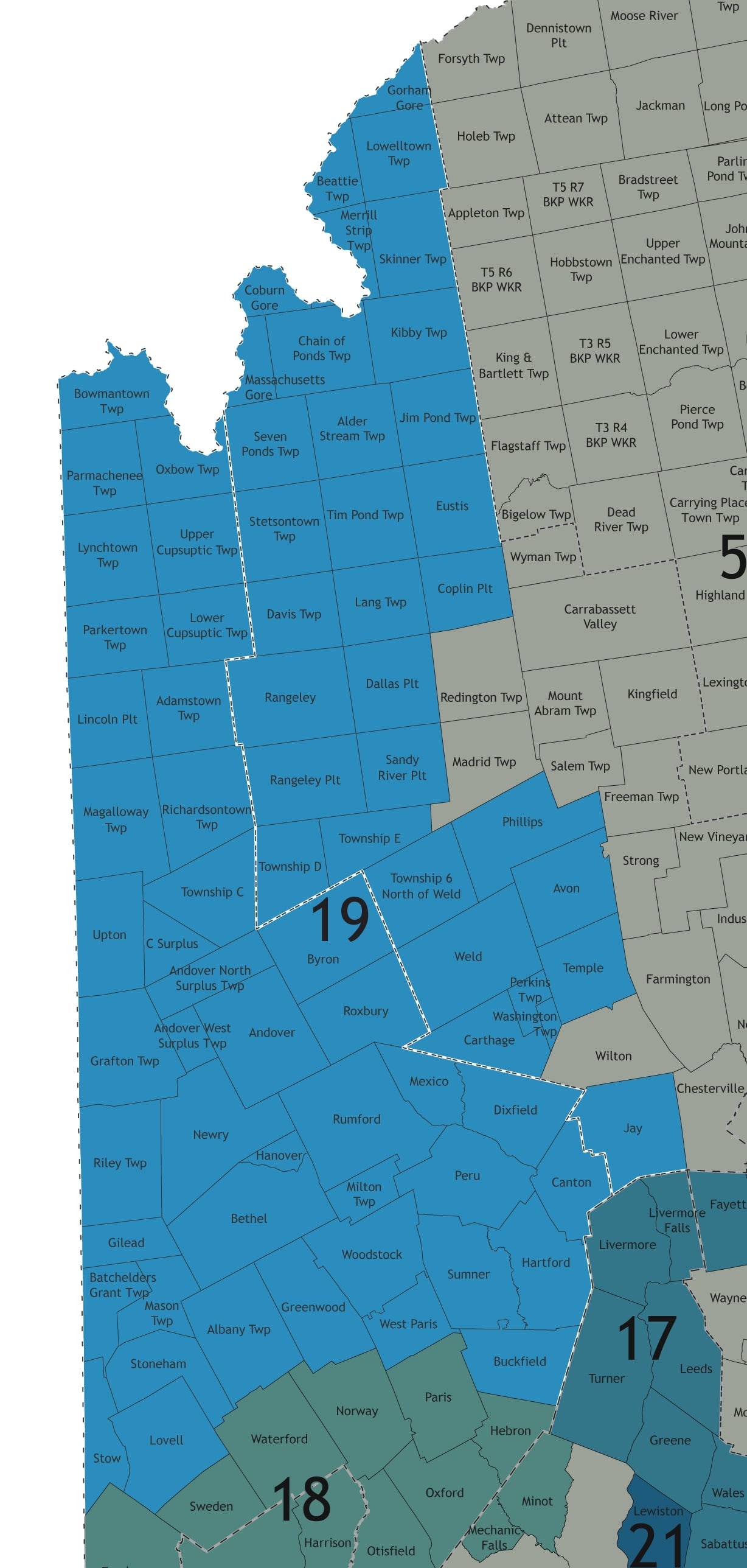
Senator
Joseph Martin; R–Rumford
- Population (2020): 39,618

Maine's 19th State Senate district is one of 35 districts in the Maine Senate. It has been represented by Republican Joseph Martin since 2024.

== Geography ==
District 19 makes up the majority of Oxford County, Maine, and the western half of Franklin County. The district borders the state of New Hampshire.

Franklin County - 18.6% of county

Oxford County - 49.8% of county

=== Franklin County ===
- Avon
- Carthage
- Coplin Plantation
- Dallas Plantation
- Eustis
- Jay
- North Franklin
- Phillips, Maine
- Rangeley
- Rangeley Plantation
- Sandy River Plantation
- South Franklin
- Temple
- Weld
- West Central Franklin

=== Oxford County ===
- Andover
- Bethel
- Buckfield
- Byron
- Canton
- Dixfield
- Gilead
- Greenwood
- Hanover
- Hartford
- Lincoln Plantation
- Lovell
- Mexico
- Milton
- Newry
- North Oxford
- Peru
- Roxbury
- Rumford
- South Oxford
- Stoneham
- Stow
- Sumner
- Upton
- West Paris
- Woodstock

== Recent election results ==
=== 2022 ===
2022 Maine State Senate election, District 19
Party	Candidate	Votes	%
Republican	Lisa Keim	11,902	62.6
Democratic	Matthew R. Bean	7,111	37.4
Total votes		19,103	100.0
Republican hold			

Elections prior to 2022 were held under different district lines.

=== 2024 ===
2024 Maine State Senate election, District 19
Party	Candidate	Votes	%
Republican	Joseph Martin	12,901	56.8
Democratic	Bruce S. Bryant	9,793	43.2
Total votes		22,694	100.0
Republican hold			

== Historical election results ==
=== 2012 ===
2012 Maine State Senate election, District 19
Party	Candidate	Votes	%
Democratic	Seth Goodall	13,445	63.8
Republican	Jeffrey Pierce	7,623	36.2
Total votes		21,068	100
Democratic hold			

=== 2013 - Special ===
2012 Maine State Senate election, District 19
Party	Candidate	Votes	%
Democratic	Eloise Vitelli	12,723	50.6
Republican	Paula Benoit	4,169	45.5
Green	Daniel Stromgren	357	3.9
Total votes		9,157	100
Democratic hold			

=== 2014 ===
Note: (Note: This election was a Republican hold, as Hamper had been redistricted from the 13th district in early 2014)

2014 Maine State Senate election, District 19
Party	Candidate	Votes	%
Republican	James Hamper	10,386	58.7
Democratic	Rose Roger-Wells	6,234	35.3
Blank votes	None	1,063	6
Total votes		17,683	100
Republican hold			

=== 2016 ===
2016 Maine State Senate election, District 19
Party	Candidate	Votes	%
Republican	James Hamper	13,396	64.8
Democratic	Joseph Chisari	7,272	35.2
Total votes		20,668	100
Republican hold			

=== 2018 ===
2018 Maine State Senate election, District 19
Party	Candidate	Votes	%
Republican	James Hamper	10,167	58.2
Democratic	Michael McKinney	7,317	41.8
Total votes		16,755	100
Republican hold			

=== 2020 ===
2020 Maine State Senate election, District 19
Party	Candidate	Votes	%
Republican	Richard Bennett	13,581	59.6
Democratic	Katherine Branch	9,209	40.4
Total votes		22,783	100
Republican hold			
