= Maine's 24th State Senate district =

American legislative district

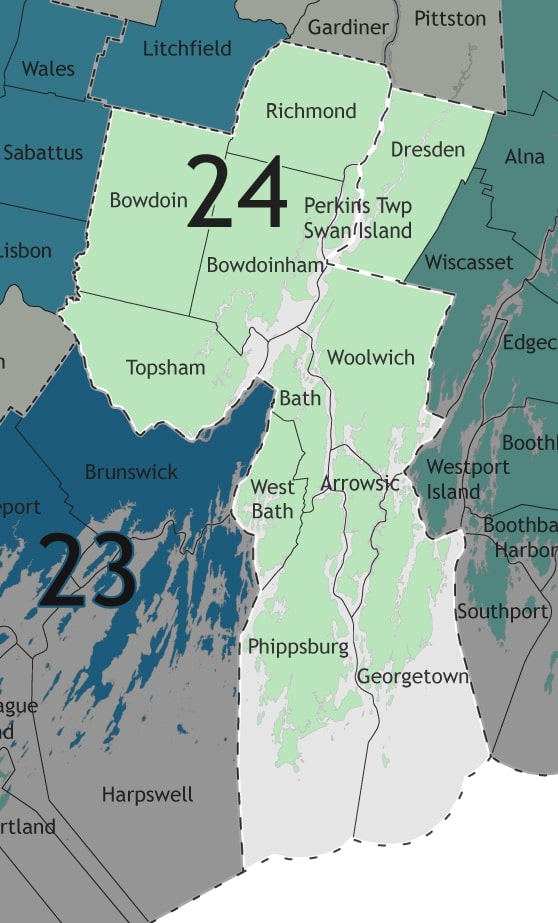
Senator
Denise Tepler; D–Topsham
- Population (2020): 38,732

Maine's 24th State Senate district is one of 35 districts in the Maine Senate. It has been represented by Democrat Denise Tepler since 2024

== Geography ==
District 24 is contains the entirety of the county of Sagadahoc. It also contains the town of Dresden of Lincoln County.

Lincoln County - 4.9% of county

Sagadahoc County - 100% of county

Lincoln:

Town:

- Dresden

Sagadahoc:

== Recent election results ==
=== 2022 ===
2022 Maine State Senate election, District 24
Party	Candidate	Votes	%
Democratic	Eloise Vitelli	12,620	58
Republican	Matthew Brackley	9,123	42
Total votes		21,743	100.0
Democratic hold			

Elections prior to 2022 were held under different district lines.

=== 2024 ===
2024 Maine State Senate election, District 24
Party	Candidate	Votes	%
Democratic	Denise Tepler	13,406	53.1
Republican	Jeffrey Pierce	10,320	40.9
Independent	Suzanne Andresen	1,525	6
Total votes		25,251	100.0
Democratic hold			

== Historical election results ==
=== 2012 ===
2012 Maine State Senate election, District 24
Party	Candidate	Votes	%
Republican	Roger Katz	11,507	62.3
Democratic	Penny Plourde	6,973	37.7
Total votes		18,477	100
Republican hold			

=== 2014 ===
2014 Maine State Senate election, District 24 (Note: This election was a Democratic Hold, as Gerzofsky had been redistricted from the 10th district in early 2014)
Party	Candidate	Votes	%
Democratic	Stanley Gerzofsky	9,779	46.3
Republican	Jennifer Johnson	6,933	32.8
Green	Fred Horch	3,518	16.8
Blank votes	None	892	4.2
Total votes		21,122	100
Democratic hold			

=== 2016 ===
2016 Maine State Senate election, District 24
Party	Candidate	Votes	%
Democratic	Everett Brownie Carson	14,833	59.6
Republican	Tristam W. Coffin	10,056	40.4
Total votes		24,889	100
Democratic hold			

=== 2018 ===
2018 Maine State Senate election, District 24
Party	Candidate	Votes	%
Democratic	Everett Brownie Carson	15,374	67.8
Republican	Diana Garcia	7,315	32.2
Total votes		22,689	100
Democratic hold			

=== 2020 ===
2020 Maine State Senate election, District 24
Party	Candidate	Votes	%
Democratic	Mattie Daughtry	18,297	66.2
Republican	Brad Pattershall	9,253	43.8
Total votes		27,650	100
Democratic hold			
