= Maine's 23rd State Senate district =

American legislative district

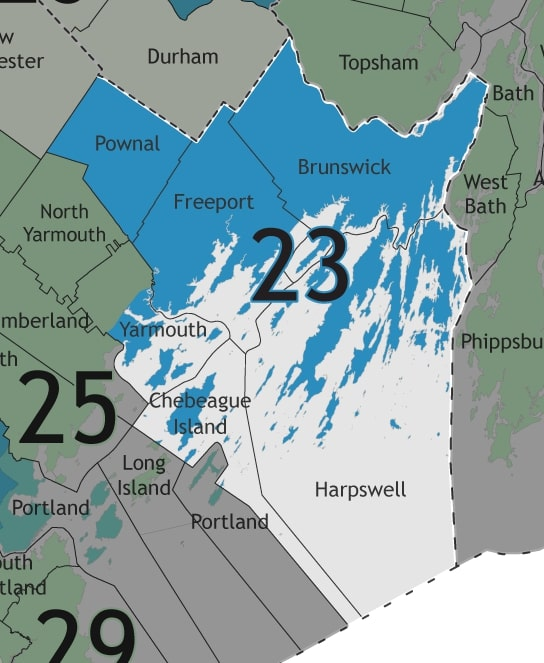
Senator
Mattie Daughtry; D–Brunswick
- Population (2020): 40,367

Maine's 23rd State Senate district is one of 35 districts in the Maine Senate. It has been represented by President of the Maine Senate, Democrat Mattie Daughtry since 2022

== Geography ==
District 23 is made up of the eastern corner of Cumberland County.

Cumberland County - 13.3% of county

Towns:

- Brunswick
- Chebeague Island
- Freeport
- Harpswell
- Pownal
- (Part of) Yarmouth

== Recent election results ==
=== 2022 ===
2022 Maine State Senate election, District 23
Party	Candidate	Votes	%
Democratic	Mattie Daughtry	16,401	69.8
Republican	Brogan Teel	7,108	30.2
Total votes		23,509	100.0
Democratic hold			

Elections prior to 2022 were held under different district lines.

=== 2024 ===
2024 Maine State Senate election, District 23
Party	Candidate	Votes	%
Democratic	Mattie Daughtry	18,898	69
Republican	Michael J. Lawler	8,489	31
Total votes		12,599	100.0
Democratic hold			

== Historical election results ==
=== 2012 ===
2012 Maine State Senate election, District 23
Party	Candidate	Votes	%
Republican	Michael Thibodeau	10,747	53.6
Democratic	Glenn Curry	9,306	46.4
Total votes		20,053	100
Republican hold			

=== 2014 ===
2014 Maine State Senate election, District 23 (Note: This election was a Republican gain, as Vitelli had been redistricted from the 19th district in early 2014)
Party	Candidate	Votes	%
Republican	Linda Baker	8,916	45.3
Democratic	Eloise Vitelli	7,880	40
Green	Alice Knapp	2,243	11.4
Blank votes	None	652	3.3
Total votes		19,691	100
Republican gain from Democratic			

=== 2016 ===
2016 Maine State Senate election, District 23
Party	Candidate	Votes	%
Democratic	Eloise Vitelli	12,038	52.9
Republican	Guy Lebida	10,712	47.1
Total votes		22,750	100
Democratic gain from Republican			

=== 2018 ===
2018 Maine State Senate election, District 23
Party	Candidate	Votes	%
Democratic	Eloise Vitelli	11,580	57.7
Republican	Richard Donaldson	8,490	32.3
Democratic hold			

=== 2020 ===
2020 Maine State Senate election, District 23
Party	Candidate	Votes	%
Democratic	Eloise Vitelli	13,810	55.8
Republican	Holly Kopp	10,922	44.2
Total votes		24,732	100
Democratic hold			
