= Maine's 27th State Senate district =

American legislative district

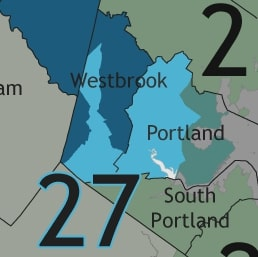
Senator
Jill Duson; D–Portland
- Population (2020): 38,875

Maine's 27th State Senate district is one of 35 districts in the Maine Senate. It has been represented by Democrat Jill Duson since 2022

== Geography ==
District 27 represents a small part of Cumberland County, consisting entirely of its county seat (and most populous city), of Portland and the city of Westbrook.

Cumberland County - 12.8% of county

Cumberland:

Cities:

- (Part of) Portland
- (Part of) Westbrook

== Recent election results ==
=== 2022 ===
2022 Maine State Senate election, District 27
Party	Candidate	Votes	%
Democratic	Jill Duson	14,225	77.9
Republican	Jeffrey Tounge	4,041	22.1
Total votes		18,266	100.0
Democratic hold			

Elections prior to 2022 were held under different district lines.

=== 2024 ===
2024 Maine State Senate election, District 27
Party	Candidate	Votes	%
Democratic	Jill Duson	16,500	77.2
Republican	Dale Holman	4,876	22.8
Total votes		23,301	100.0
Democratic hold			

== Historical election results ==
=== 2012 ===
2012 Maine State Senate election, District 27
Party	Candidate	Votes	%
Republican	Douglas Thomas	97,481	92.4
Democratic	David Schwanke	8,061	7.6
Total votes		105,524	100
Republican hold			

=== 2014 ===
Note: (Note: This election was a Democratic Hold, as Alfond had been redistricted from the 8th district in early 2014)

2014 Maine State Senate election, District 27
Party	Candidate	Votes	%
Democratic	Justin Alfond	11,376	64.4
Green	Asher Platts	2,852	16.1
Republican	Peter Doyle	2,612	14.8
Blank votes	None	827	4.7
Total votes		17,667	100
Democratic hold			

=== 2016 ===
2016 Maine State Senate election, District 27
Party	Candidate	Votes	%
Democratic	Benjamin Chipaman	14,921	67.2
Green	Seth Baker	3,712	16.7
Republican	Adam Pontius	3,562	16
Total votes		22,203	100
Democratic hold			

=== 2018 ===
2018 Maine State Senate election, District 27
Party	Candidate	Votes	%
Democratic	Benjamin Chipman	14,858	74.9
Independent	Crystal Chaney	4,975	25.1
Total votes		19,833	100
Democratic hold			

=== 2020 ===
2020 Maine State Senate election, District 27
Party	Candidate	Votes	%
Democratic	Benjamin Chipman	21,813	100%
Total votes		21,813	100
Democratic hold			
