= Maine's 17th State Senate district =

American legislative district

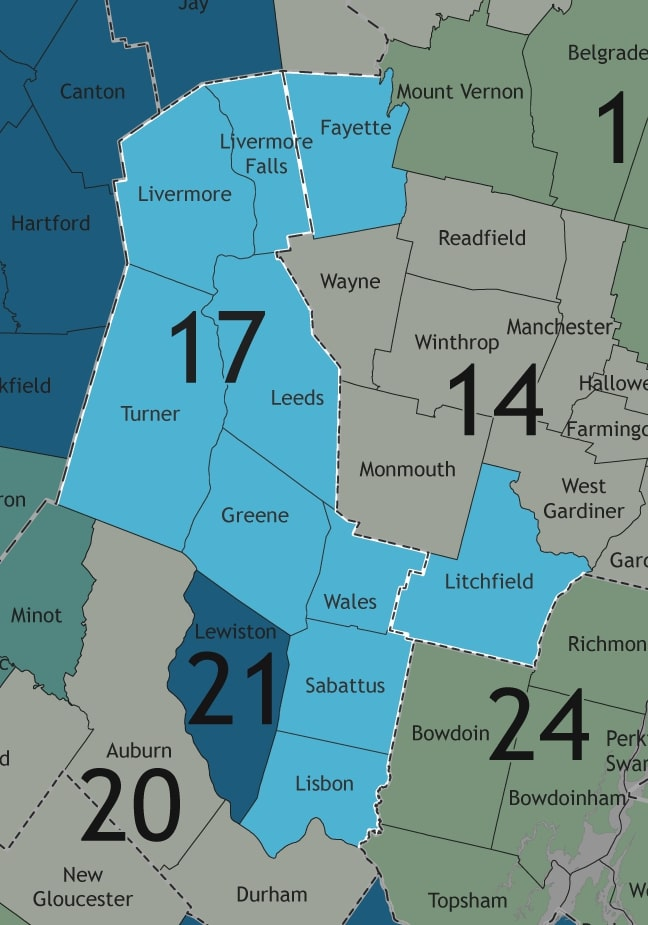
Senator
Jeff Timberlake; R–Turner
- Population (2020): 39,116

Maine's 17th State Senate district is one of 35 districts in the Maine Senate. It has been represented by Republican Jeff Timberlake since 2022.

== Geography ==
District 17 represents the northern half of Androscoggin County. It also includes the towns of Fayette and Litchfield of Kennebec County

Androscoggin County - 30.6% of county

Kennebec County - 3.8% of county

Androscoggin:

Towns:

- Greene
- Leeds
- Lisbon
- Livermore
- Livermore Falls
- Sabattus
- Turner
- Wales

Kennebec:

Towns:

- Fayette
- Litchfield

== Recent election results ==
=== 2022 ===
2022 Maine State Senate election, District 17
Party	Candidate	Votes	%
Republican	Jeff Timberlake	11,989	65.8
Democratic	Jo-Jean Keller	6,220	34.2
Total votes		18,209	100.0
Republican hold			

Elections prior to 2022 were held under different district lines.

=== 2024 ===
2024 Maine State Senate election, District 17
Party	Candidate	Votes	%
Republican	Jeff Timberlake	14,751	67.8
Democratic	Thomas Watson	7,005	32.7
Total votes		21,756	100.0
Republican hold			

== Historical election results ==
=== 2012 ===
2012 Maine State Senate election, District 17
Party	Candidate	Votes	%
Republican	Garrett Mason	9,818	50.1
Democratic	Colleen Quint	9,790	49.9
Total votes		19,608	100
Republican hold			

=== 2014 ===
2014 Maine State Senate election, District 17
Party	Candidate	Votes	%
Republican	Thomas Saviello	12,529	69.5
Democratic	Joanne Dunlap	4,869	27
Blank votes	None	637	3.5
Total votes		18,035	100
Republican hold			

=== 2016 ===
2016 Maine State Senate election, District 17
Party	Candidate	Votes	%
Republican	Thomas Saviello	14,975	72.2
Democratic	Joanne Dunlap	5,752	27.8
Total votes		20,727	100
Republican hold			

=== 2018 ===
2018 Maine State Senate election, District 17
Party	Candidate	Votes	%
Republican	Russell Black	9,715	54.5
Democratic	Jan Collins	8,105	45.5
Total votes		17,820	100
Republican hold			

=== 2020 ===
2020 Maine State Senate election, District 17
Party	Candidate	Votes	%
Republican	Russell Black	12,776	58.6
Democratic	Jan Collins	9,032	41.4
Total votes		21,808	100
Republican hold			
