= Peggy Rotundo =

American politician (born 1949)

Margaret Rotundo

Member of the Maine House of Representatives from the 59th district
- In office December 3, 2008 – December 7, 2016
- Preceded by: Margaret Craven
- Succeeded by: Roger Fuller

Member of the Maine Senate from the 21st district
- In office November 8, 2022 – Incumbent
- Preceded by: Nathan Libby

Member of the Maine Senate from the 16th district
- In office December 6, 2000 – December 3, 2008
- Preceded by: Georgette Berube
- Succeeded by: Margaret Craven

Personal details
- Born: July 16, 1949 (age 77) Schenectady, New York, U.S.
- Party: Democratic
- Spouse: Loring Danforth
- Education: Mount Holyoke College
- Profession: College administrator

Margaret "Peggy" R. Rotundo (born July 16, 1949) is an American politician from Maine. She currently serves in the Maine Senate for the 21. Rotundo served as a Democratic member of the Maine House of Representatives, representing District 74, which included part of Lewiston, from 2008 until 2016. From 2000 to 2008, she represented Lewiston in the Maine Senate. In 2006 she was named Senate Chair of the Maine Joint Committee on Appropriations and Financial Affairs. Supporters have regularly praised Rotundo for her commitment to bipartisanship and her advocacy for Maine people, particularly veterans, children, the elderly, immigrants and working mothers. In February 2016, Rotundo announced she would not run for Maine Senate. She was unable to seek re-election to the Maine House of Representatives due to term-limits.

In 2026, Rotundo announced she would not seek reelection to the Maine Senate, with Representative Mana Abdi announcing her candidacy for the seat the next day.

Rotundo served as an at-large member of the Lewiston School Committee from 1994 to 2002, including four years as Chair of the School Committee (1998–2002).

Rotundo was born in Schenectady, New York and graduated from Mount Holyoke College in 1971. She has worked in the Bates College administration since 1978. Rotundo had previously worked from 1976 to 1978 as development director at the Abington Friends School in Pennsylvania.
