= Maine's 20th State Senate district =

Maine state legislative district

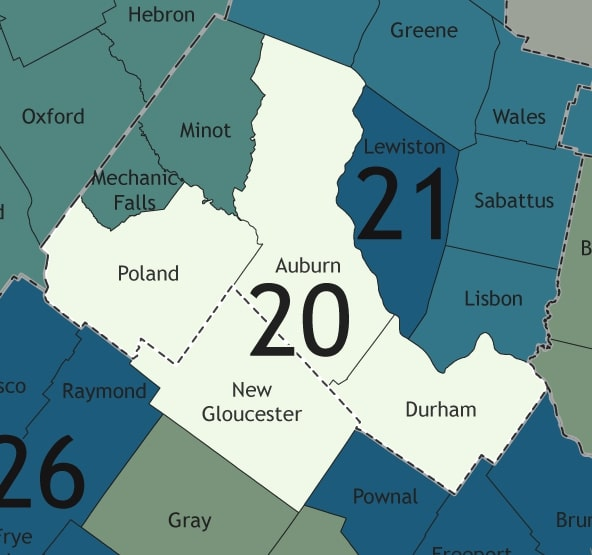
Senator
Bruce Bickford; R–Auburn
- Population (2020): 40,150

Maine's 20th State Senate district is one of 35 districts in the Maine Senate. It has been represented by Republican Bruce Bickford since 2024.

== Geography ==
District 20 represents the city of Auburn and towns of Durham and Poland of Androscoggin County. The district also includes the town of New Gloucester of Cumberland County.

Androscoggin County - 30.7% of county

Cumberland County - 1.9% of county

Androscoggin:

City:

- Auburn

Towns:

- Durham
- Poland
- Eustis

Cumberland:

Town:

- New Gloucester

== Recent election results ==
=== 2022 ===
2022 Maine State Senate election, District 20
Party	Candidate	Votes	%
Republican	Eric Brakey	9,064	50.4
Democratic	Bettyann Sheats	8,918	49.6
Total votes		17,982	100.0
Republican gain from Democratic			

Elections prior to 2022 were held under different district lines.

=== 2024 ===
2024 Maine State Senate election, District 20
Party	Candidate	Votes	%
Republican	Bruce Bickford	11,174	50.1
Democratic	Bettyann Sheats	10,187	45.7
Independent	Dustin Ward	930	4.2
Total votes		22,291	100.0
Republican hold			

== Historical election results ==
=== 2012 ===
2012 Maine State Senate election, District 19
Party	Candidate	Votes	%
Democratic	Chris Johnson	10,943	50.4
Republican	Leslie Fossel	10,772	49.6
Total votes		21,715	100
Democratic hold			

=== 2014 ===
Note: (Note: This election was a Republican hold, as Hamper had been redistricted from the 13th district in early 2014)

2014 Maine State Senate election, District 20
Party	Candidate	Votes	%
Republican	Eric Brakey	10,138	56.5
Democratic	John Cleveland	7,144	39.8
Blank votes	None	668	3.7
Total votes		17,950	100
Republican gain from Democratic			

=== 2016 ===
2016 Maine State Senate election, District 20
Party	Candidate	Votes	%
Republican	Eric Brakey	13,047	61.4
Democratic	Kimberly Sampson	8,214	36.6
Total votes		21,261	100
Republican hold			

=== 2018 ===
2018 Maine State Senate election, District 20
Party	Candidate	Votes	%
Democratic	Ned Claxton	8,993	50.7
Republican	Eleanor Espling	8,758	49.3
Total votes		17,751	100
Democratic gain from Republican			

=== 2020 ===
2020 Maine State Senate election, District 20
Party	Candidate	Votes	%
Democratic	Ned Claxton	11,884	53.4
Republican	Matthew Leonard	10,361	46.6
Total votes		22,254	100
Democratic hold			
