= Maine's 21st State Senate district =

American legislative district

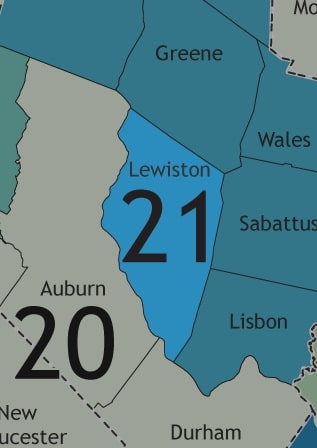
Senator
Margaret 'Peggy' Rotundo; D–Lewiston
- Population (2020): 37,886

Maine's 21st State Senate district is one of 35 districts in the Maine Senate. It has been represented by Democrat Margaret Rotundo since 2022

== Geography ==
District 21 is entirely made up of Maine's second most populous city, Lewiston, of Androscoggin County.

Androscoggin County - 34.1% of county

== Recent election results ==
=== 2022 ===
2022 Maine State Senate election, District 21
Party	Candidate	Votes	%
Democratic	Craig Hickman	7,754	58.6
Republican	Ricky LaCahppelle	5,484	41.4
Total votes		13,238	100.0
Democratic hold			

Elections prior to 2022 were held under different district lines.

=== 2024 ===
2024 Maine State Senate election, District 21
Party	Candidate	Votes	%
Democratic	Margaret Rotundo	12,599	100%
Total votes		12,599	100.0
Democratic hold			

== Historical election results ==
=== 2012 ===
2012 Maine State Senate election, District 21
Party	Candidate	Votes	%
Republican	Patrick Flood	10,308	50.7
Democratic	David Bustin	10,031	49.3
Total votes		20,339	100
Republican gain from Democratic			

=== 2014 ===
2014 Maine State Senate election, District 21
Party	Candidate	Votes	%
Democratic	Nathan Libby	6,646	48.6
Republican	Patrica Gagne	6,563	48
Blank votes	None	463	3.4
Total votes		13,672	100
Democratic gain from Republican			

=== 2016 ===
2018 Maine State Senate election, District 21
Party	Candidate	Votes	%
Democratic	Nathan Libby	Unopposed	
Democratic hold			

=== 2018 ===
2018 Maine State Senate election, District 21
Party	Candidate	Votes	%
Democratic	Nathan Libby	8,210	60.4
Republican	Nelson Peters Jr.	5,378	39.6
Total votes		13,588	100
Democratic hold			

=== 2020 ===
2020 Maine State Senate election, District 21
Party	Candidate	Votes	%
Democratic	Nathan Libby	10,171	59.6
Republican	Timothy Gallant	6,882	40.4
Total votes		17,053	100
Democratic hold			
