= Maine's 30th State Senate district =

American legislative district

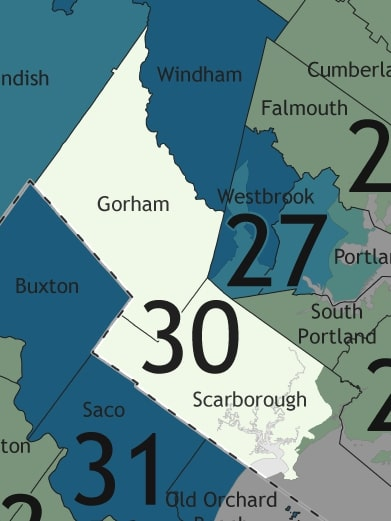
Senator
Stacy Brenner; D–Scarborough
- Population (2020): 38,621

Maine's 30th State Senate district is one of 35 districts in the Maine Senate. It has been represented by Democrat Stacy Brenner since 2020.

== Geography ==
District 30 represents a small part of Cumberland County, including the town of Gorham and the majority of the town of Scarborough.

Cumberland County - 12.7% of county

== Recent election results ==
=== 2022 ===
2022 Maine State Senate election, District 30
Party	Candidate	Votes	%
Democratic	Stacy Brenner	12,685	62
Republican	Timothy Thorsen	7,766	38
Total votes		20,451	100.0
Democratic hold			

Elections prior to 2022 were held under different district lines.

=== 2024 ===
2024 Maine State Senate election, District 30
Party	Candidate	Votes	%
Democratic	Stacy Brenner	15,021	60.3
Republican	Donald R. Hamill	9,875	39.7
Total votes		24,896	100.0
Democratic hold			

== Historical election results ==
=== 2012 ===
2012 Maine State Senate election, District 30
Party	Candidate	Votes	%
Democratic	Emily Cain	11,021	62.8
Republican	Anne Perry	6,537	37.2
Total votes		17,558	100
Democratic hold			

=== 2014 ===
2014 Maine State Senate election, District 30
Party	Candidate	Votes	%
Republican	Amy Volk	10,295	51.3
Democratic	James Boyle	9,139	45.5
Blank votes	None	653	3.3
Total votes		20,087	100
Republican gain from Democratic			

=== 2016 ===
2016 Maine State Senate election, District 30
Party	Candidate	Votes	%
Republican	Amy Volk	14,621	59.5
Democratic	Jean-Marie Caterina	9,960	40.5
Total votes		24,581	100
Republican hold			

=== 2018 ===
2018 Maine State Senate election, District 30
Party	Candidate	Votes	%
Democratic	Linda Sanborn	11,770	50.4
Republican	Amy Volk	10,979	49.6
Total votes		22,145	100
Democratic gain from Republican			

=== 2020 ===
2020 Maine State Senate election, District 30
Party	Candidate	Votes	%
Democratic	Stacy Brenner	14,960	53.9
Republican	Sara Renard	12,778	46.1
Total votes		27,738	100
Democratic hold			
