= Denise Tepler =

American politician

Member of the Maine Senate from the 24th district
- In office December 3, 2024 – present
- Preceded by: Eloise Vitelli
- Succeeded by: Karen Montell

Member of the U.S. House of Representatives from 's 54th district
- In office December 3, 2014 – November 8, 2022
- Preceded by: Catherine Nadeau

Personal details
- Born: May 15, 1956 (age 70) Philadelphia, Philadelphia, U.S.
- Party: Democratic
- Spouse: Sheldon Tepler (m. 1981)
- Children: 5
- Education: University of Pennsylvania (BA, MA)

Denise Anne Tepler (born May 15, 1956) is an American politician serving as a member of the Maine Senate from the 24th district. A Democrat, she was first elected to the Maine House of Representatives in November 2014, she assumed office on December 3, 2014, before being term-limited in 2022 and choosing to run for the Senate in 2024.

== Early life and education ==
Tepler was born in Philadelphia in 1956. She earned a Bachelor of Arts degree in anthropology and a Master of Arts in cultural anthropology from the University of Pennsylvania. She also studied public policy at the University of Southern Maine.

== Career ==
From 1981 to 1983, Tepler worked as director of internal communication at the University of Arkansas at Little Rock. She was also a curatorial assistant at the Peary–MacMillan Arctic Museum. She later worked as a substitute teacher for the Brunswick School Department and as an adjunct professor at the University of Maine. From 2006 to 2008, she was a research assistant for the Maine Humanities Council. She was elected to the Maine House of Representatives in 2014. Since 2020, she has served as chair of the House Health Coverage, Insurance and Financial Services Committee.
