= Mike Tipping =

American politician

Member of the Maine Senate from the 8th district
- Incumbent
- Assumed office December 7, 2022
- Preceded by: Kimberley Rosen

Personal details
- Born: 1983 or 1984 (age 42–43)
- Party: Democratic
- Education: Dalhousie University (BA)

Michael Tipping (born 1983/1984) is an American writer, activist, and politician from Maine. A Democrat, Tipping serves in the Maine State Senate representing District 8. He grew up in Orono, Maine and attended Orono High School and Dalhousie University, working as a progressive activist on several statewide referendum questions and for an initiative to clean mercury pollution from the Penobscot River. Tipping announced his run for the Maine Senate in September 2021, and was elected in November of 2022 to his first term.

== Early life and career ==
Tipping Grew up in Orono and attended Asa Adams Elementary School, Orono Middle School and Orono High School. He then attended Dalhousie University in Nova Scotia. Tipping worked as a progressive activist for various causes in Maine, including a successful 2016 referendum to increase Maine's minimuim wage, a 2018 referendum to provide universal home care for Maine citizens over the age of 65, as well as an environmental initiative to clean up mercury pollution in the Penobscot River.

In 2014, Tipping published As Maine Went: Governor Paul LePage and the Tea Party Takeover of Maine about Maine Governor Paul LePage.

=== Politics ===
Tipping announced in September 2021 that he would run for the Maine State Senate. He faced Democrat Abe Furth in the June 2022 primary, defeating him 62%-38%. In the November 2022 general election, Tipping defeated Republican Eric Rojo 53%-47%.

== Personal life ==
Tipping lives in Orono with his wife, Maggie, and their twin children. He works as a senior strategist for the Maine People's Alliance.

== Electoral history ==
2022 Maine Senate District 8 Democratic primary
Party	Candidate	Votes	%
Democratic	Mike Tipping	1,354	62%
Democratic	Abe Furth	827	38%
Total votes		2,181	100%

2022 Maine Senate District 8 general election
Party	Candidate	Votes	%
Democratic	Mike Tipping	8,317	53%
Republican	Eric Rojo	7,421	47%
Total votes		15,729	100%
