= Jill Duson =

American politician

Member of the Maine Senate from the 27th district
- Incumbent
- Assumed office December 7, 2022
- Preceded by: Heather Sanborn

Mayor of Portland
- In office December 2008 – December 2010
- Preceded by: Edward Suslovic
- Succeeded by: Nick Mavodones Jr.
- In office December 2004 – December 2005
- Preceded by: Nathan Smith
- Succeeded by: James I. Cohen

Personal details
- Born: Jill C. Duson; 1953 (age 72–73) Chester, Pennsylvania
- Party: Democratic
- Spouse: Divorced
- Children: Two
- Education: Antioch College (BA); University of Pennsylvania Law School (JD); Harvard University Kennedy School of Government. (Certificate in State & Local Government)
- Occupation: Attorney, Lobbyist, Retail

Jill C. Duson (born 1953) is an American lawyer, lobbyist, and politician from Portland, Maine.

== Political career ==
Duson has served on both the Portland School Board and the Portland, Maine City Council since 2001. In 2004, Duson became the first African-American mayor of Portland, Maine's largest city, and the first African-American woman mayor in the state when she was elected by her fellow council members to chair meetings under the city's then council-manager system.

In 2011, Duson ran for the newly created position of mayor. Rep. Anne Haskell was her campaign manager. She finished in sixth place out of fifteen candidates on the ballot.

In 2012, Duson was a delegate to the Democratic National Convention and a Democratic elector in the general election. She was a supporter of President Barack Obama.

In June 2016, Duson ran for the Democratic nomination for State Senate in her district. She lost to Representative and former sheriff Mark Dion.

In November 2017, Duson was re-elected for the fifth time, over two challengers. Soon thereafter, she declared her intent to seek the nomination for State Senate in the 2018 election, after Dion announced his intention to run for governor. In June, Duson received approximately 41% of the votes in the Democratic primary, and lost to Maine Rep. Heather Sanborn.

Duson did not seek re-election in 2020. She was elected to the Maine Senate in 2022, becoming the first Black woman to serve as a state senator in Maine's history.

== Policies ==
In April 2015, Duson led the charge to reduce the city's minimum wage to $8.75 an hour from the proposed $10.10 per hour proposed by Mayor Michael F. Brennan. Duson's proposal passed the city's Finance Committee before being rejected by the City Council in favor of the original proposal.

== Personal ==
Duson grew up impoverished in Chester, Pennsylvania. Her mother was part of a rent strike when she was a child. However, she earned a B.A. from Antioch College, a J.D. from the University of Pennsylvania Law School, and a Certificate in Senior Executive in State & Local Government from Harvard University's Kennedy School of Government.

Duson has dealt with financial troubles, including potential foreclosure on her home in Portland's North Deering neighborhood. According to court records, she "had about $73 in the bank" at the time of her 2012 bankruptcy. In 2017, Duson was still fighting to avoid foreclosure.

Outside of elected office, Duson has worked as a lobbyist for Central Maine Power, Director of Bureau of Rehabilitation Services, Maine Department of Labor, compliance director for the Maine Human Rights Commission as well as in retail with L.L.Bean.
