= Stacy Brenner =

American politician

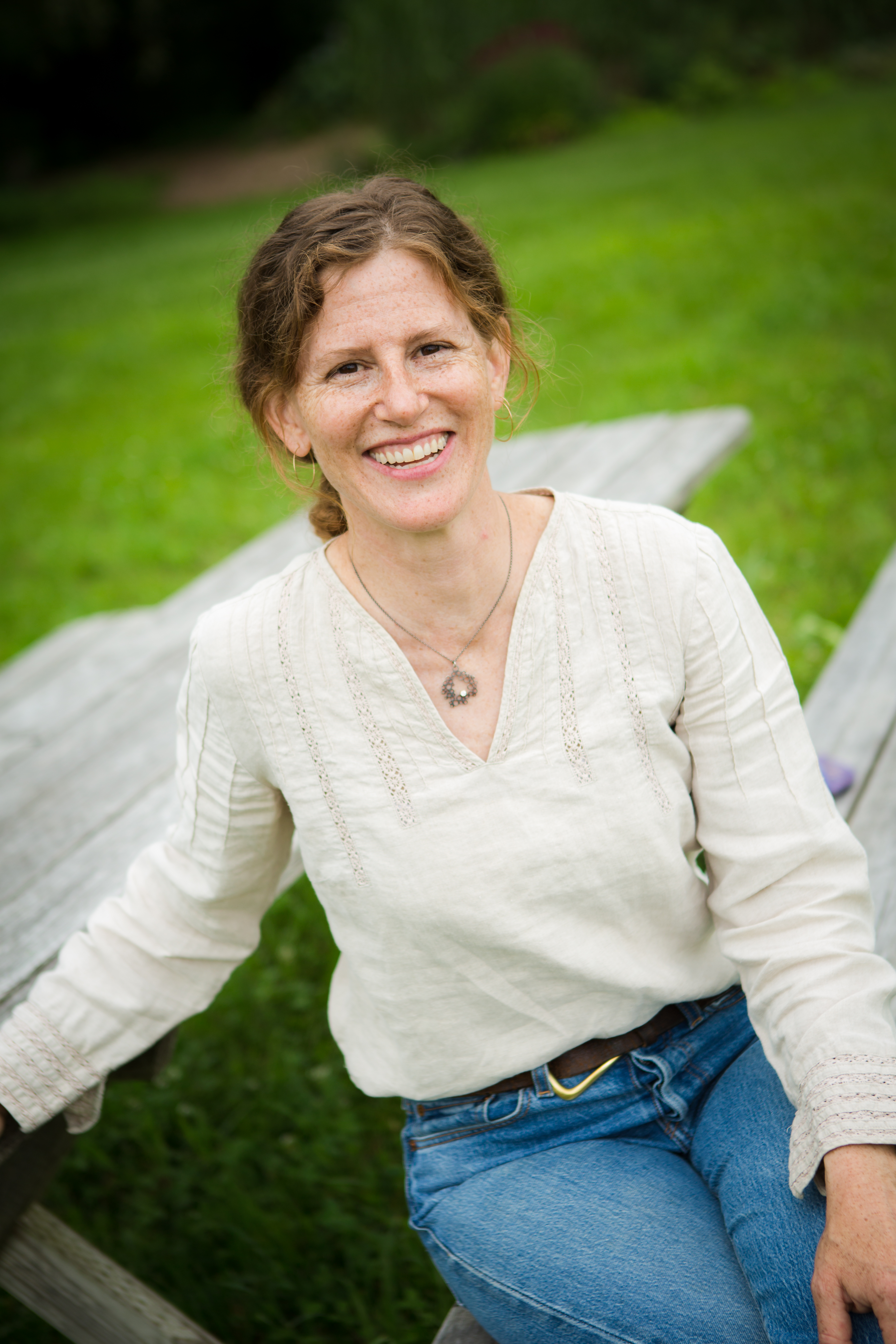

Member of the Maine Senate from the 30th district
- Incumbent
- Assumed office December 2, 2020
- Preceded by: Linda Sanborn

Personal details
- Party: Democratic
- Spouse: John Bliss
- Profession: Organic farmer, nurse
- Website: Campaign website

Stacy Fielding Brenner is an American Democratic politician, registered nurse, small business owner and organic farmer. She currently represents Maine State Senate District 30, consisting of the towns of Bar Mills, Gorham, Scarborough, and part of Buxton, and co-owns and operates Broadturn Farm in Scarborough.

== Early life and education ==
Brenner grew up in New Jersey and attended the University of Arizona where she earned a bachelor's degree in agriculture. She also holds a BSN and MSN from the University of Pennsylvania. Brenner worked as a nurse-midwife at the Mercy Hospital of Portland as a new nurse and currently works per-diem there.

== Broadturn Farm ==
Brenner and her husband John Bliss moved to Maine in 2002 to establish a family farm. They founded and currently maintain Broadturn Farm, located on a 434-acre preserve in Scarborough, Maine on Abenaki tribal homeland. The land is now owned by the Scarborough Land Trust (SLT) and protected by a conservation easement. On July 1, 2020, Broadturn Farm began a 99-year lease of the land from SLT.

Broadturn produces wholesale flowers, event arrangements and a flower CSA, hosts weddings, and ran a summer youth program until 2021.

Brenner has been a member of the Maine Farmland Trust since 2008. and is the vice-president of the Board of Directors for the Maine Organic Farmers and Gardeners Association (MOFGA). In September 2020, she joined 135 Maine farmers and 2,100 farmers and ranchers nationwide signing a letter to the U.S. House Select Committee urging action on climate change.

== Political career ==
In 2020, Brenner ran for the Maine State Senate District 30 seat vacated by retiring Democratic senator Linda Sanborn. On November 3, Brenner defeated Republican Sara Rivard 54%-46%.

== Personal life ==
Brenner and her husband, John Bliss, have two daughters: Emma, a nurse; and Flora, a high school student.

== Electoral record ==
2020 general election: Maine State Senate, District 30
Party	Candidate	Votes	%
Democratic	Stacy Brenner	14,960	53.9%
Republican	Sara Rivard	12,778	46.1%
Total votes		27,738	100.0%
