= Maine's 5th State Senate district =

American legislative district

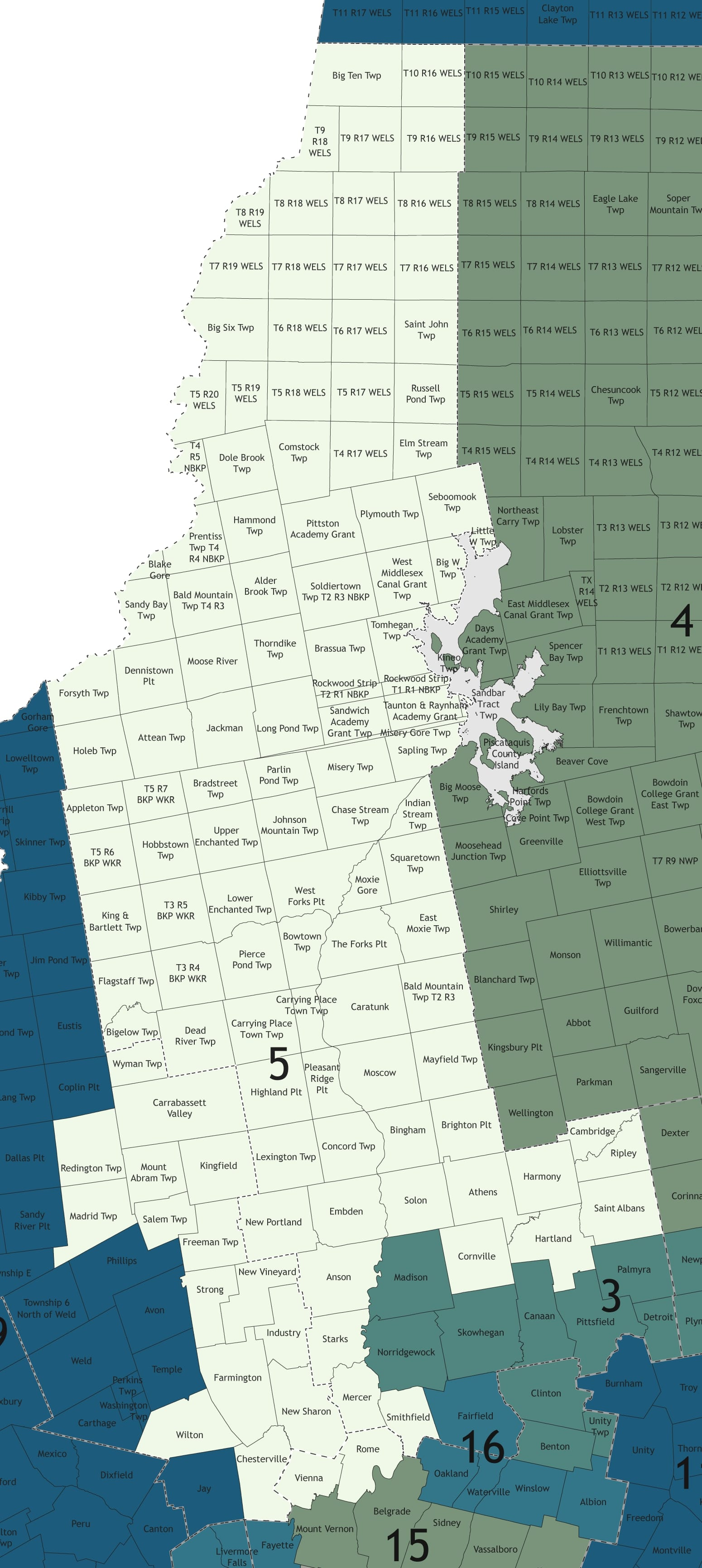
Senator
Russell Black; R–Wilton
since December 7, 2022
- Demographics: 92% White; 1% Black; 2% Hispanic; 1% Asian; 0% Native American; 0% Hawaiian/Pacific Islander; 0% Other; 4% Multiracial
- Population (2024): 40,971

Maine's 5th State Senate district is one of the 35 districts of the Maine Senate. It is represented by Russell Black, a Republican, who has represented the district since it was redrawn in the 2022 redistricting.

== Geography ==
Maine's 5th State Senate district includes parts of Franklin, Kennebec, and Somerset counties.

== Election results ==
=== 2024 ===
2024 Maine Senate election, 5th District
Party	Candidate	Votes	%
Republican	Russell Black (incumbent)	15,267	65.83
Democratic	Kathleen B. O’Donnell	7,926	34.17
Total votes		23,193	100.00
Republican hold			

=== 2022 ===
2022 Maine Senate election, 5th District
Party	Candidate	Votes	%
Republican	Russell Black (incumbent)	10,737	54.98
Democratic	Stanley Wheeler	6,420	32.87
Real Maine Independent	Douglas Thomas	2,373	12.15
Total votes		19,530	100.00
Republican hold			
