= Cameron Reny =

American Politician

Member of the Maine Senate from the 13 district
- Incumbent
- Assumed office December 7, 2022
- Preceded by: Chloe Maxmin

Personal details
- Born: Lincoln County, Maine, U.S.
- Party: Democratic
- Spouse: Adam Reny
- Children: 2
- Education: Guilford College (BA); University of Southern Maine (MA)

Cameron Reny is an American politician serving as a member of the Maine Senate for the 13th district. She assumed office on December 7, 2022.

== Early life and education ==
Reny was born in Lincoln County, Maine, and raised in the community of Round Pond. After graduating from Lincoln Academy, she earned a Bachelor of Arts in community and justice studies from Guilford College and a Master of Arts in school counseling from the University of Southern Maine.

== Career ==
Reny has worked as a school counselor in RSU 1 for eight years. She was elected to the Maine Senate in November 2022 and assumed office on December 7, 2022.

== Personal life ==
Reny's husband, Adam Reny, is an owner-operator of the Renys department store chain. She has two children.
