= Maine's 8th State Senate district =

American legislative district

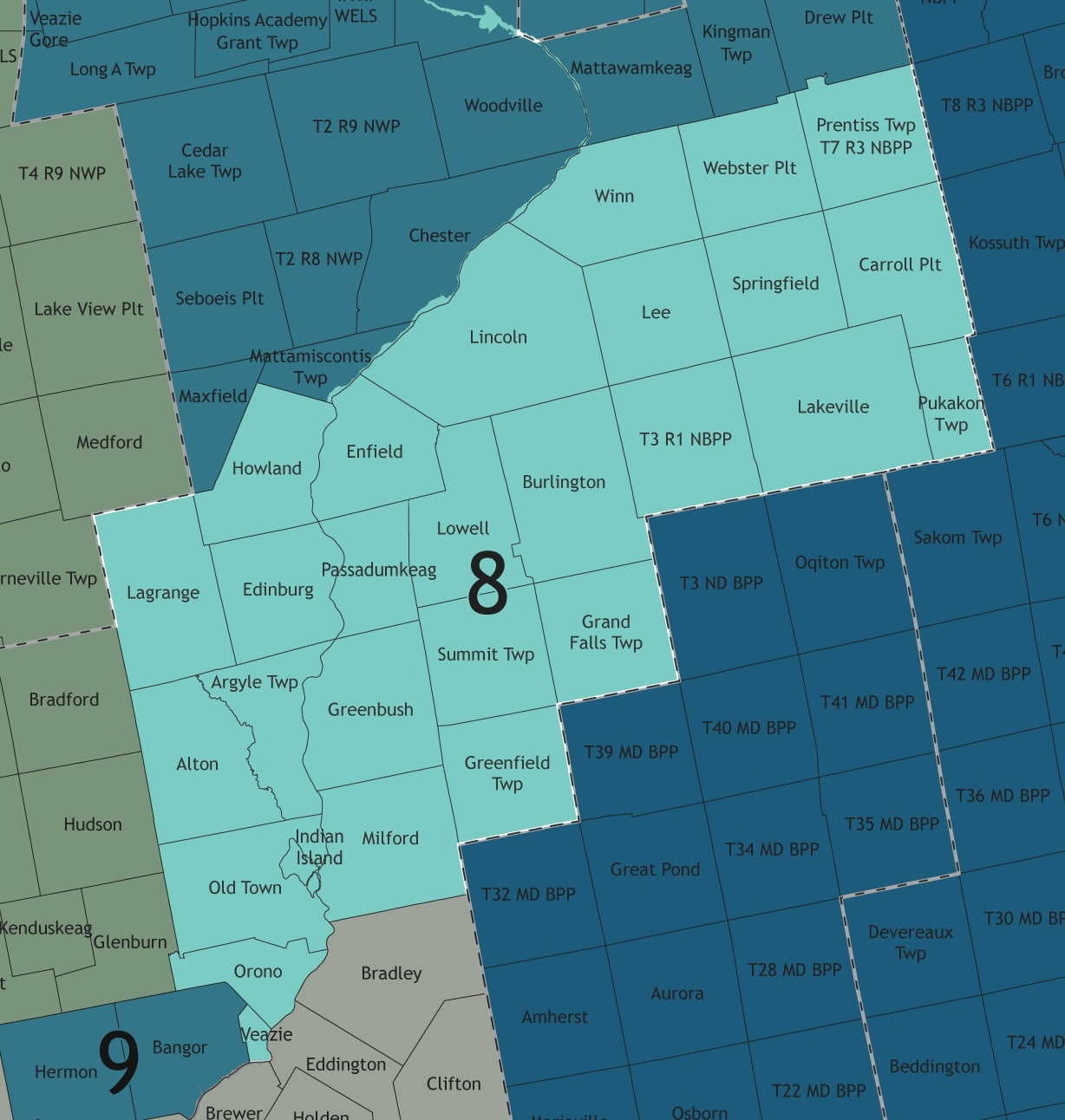
Senator
Mike Tipping; D–Orono
- Registration: 26.3% Democratic; 25.9% Republican; 43.8% No party preference
- Population (2020): 38,953

Maine's 8th State Senate district is one of 35 districts in the Maine Senate. It has been represented by Democrat Mike Tipping since 2022.

== Geography ==
District 8 represents a small part of Penobscot County.

Penobscot County - 25% of county

Penobscot:

City:

- Old Town

Towns:

- Alton
- Argyle
- Burlington
- Brooksville
- Carroll Plantation
- Edinburg
- Enfield
- Greenbush
- Howland
- Indian Island
- Lagrange
- Lakeville
- Lee
- Lincoln
- Lowell
- Milford
- Orono
- Passadumkeag
- Springfield
- Veazie
- Webster Plantation
- Winn

== Election results ==
=== 2022 ===
2022 Maine State Senate election, District 8
Party	Candidate	Votes	%
Democratic	Mike Tipping	8,317	52.8
Republican	Eric Rojo	7,421	47.2
Total votes		15,738	100.0
Democratic gain from Republican			

Elections prior to 2022 were held under different district lines.

=== 2024 ===
2024 Maine State Senate election, District 8
Party	Candidate	Votes	%
Democratic	Mike Tipping	10,240	50.3
Republican	Leo C. Kenney	10,108	47
Total votes		20,348	100.0
Democratic hold			

== Historical election results ==
=== 2012 ===
2012 Maine State Senate election, District 8
Party	Candidate	Votes	%
Democratic	Justin Alfond	12,672	70.8
Green	Asher Platts	5,185	29
Republican	John M. Brown	48	0.3
Total votes		17,905	100
Democratic hold			

=== 2014 ===
2014 Maine State Senate election, District 8
Party	Candidate	Votes	%
Republican	Kimberley Rosen	9,671	53.5
Democratic	Paul P. Davis	7,569	41.9
Blank votes	None	836	4.6
Total votes		18,076	100
Republican gain from Democratic			

=== 2016 ===
2016 Maine State Senate election, District 8
Party	Candidate	Votes	%
Republican	Kimberley Rosen	Unopposed	100%
Total votes		N/A	
Republican hold			

=== 2018 ===
2018 Maine State Senate election, District 8
Party	Candidate	Votes	%
Republican	Kimberley Rosen	10,521	58.5
Democratic	Beverly Ulenhake	7,458	41.5
Total votes		17,979	100
Republican hold			

=== 2020 ===
2020 Maine State Senate election, District 8
Party	Candidate	Votes	%
Republican	Kimberley Rosen	13,113	57.8
Democratic	Beverly Ulenhake	8,332	36.7
Independent	Teresa Montague	1,231	5.4
Total votes		22,676	100
Republican hold			
