= Russell Black =

American politician

Russell J. Black

Member of the Maine Senate
- Incumbent
- Assumed office December 7, 2022
- Preceded by: Jim Dill
- Constituency: 5th district
- In office December 2018 – December 7, 2022
- Preceded by: Tom Saviello
- Succeeded by: Jeff Timberlake
- Constituency: 17th district

Member of the Maine House of Representatives from the 114th district
- In office December 2010 – December 2018

Personal details
- Party: Republican
- Profession: Farmer
- Website: Official website

Russell J. Black is an American politician from Maine. Black, a Republican from Wilton, has served in the Maine Senate since 2018. He represented District 17 in the Maine Senate from 2018 to 2022, having replaced fellow Republican Tom Saviello, and has represented District 5 since 2022. From 2010 to 2018, Black served in the Maine House of Representatives for District 114.

== Background ==
Black attended Central Maine Community College and Wentworth Institute of Technology. He is married with four children.

Maine House of Representatives
Preceded by Tom Saviello	Member of the Maine House of Representatives from the 90th district 2010–2014	Succeeded by Michael G. Devin
Preceded by Peter C. Stuckey	Member of the Maine House of Representatives from the 114th district 2014–2018	Succeeded by Randall Hall
Maine Senate
Preceded by Tom Saviello	Member of the Maine Senate from the 17th district 2018–2022	Succeeded by Jeff Timberlake
Preceded by Jim Dill	Member of the Maine Senate from the 5th district 2022–present	Incumbent
