= Peter Edgecomb =

American politician from Maine

Member of the Maine Senate for the 1st District
- In office December 2014 – December 2016
- Preceded by: Dawn Hill
- Succeeded by: Troy Jackson

Member of the Maine House of Representatives for the 4th District
- In office December 2004 – December 2012
- Succeeded by: Carol McElwee

Personal details
- Party: Republican
- Education: University of Maine, University of New Hampshire
- Profession: Educator

Peter Edgecomb is an American politician from Maine. Edgecomb represented District 1 in the Maine Senate. He previously represented District 4 in the Maine House of Representatives, which was part of Aroostook County. He resides in the city of Caribou. He is a Republican and was first elected to the House in 2004. He was re-elected in 2006, 2008 and 2010 and was unable to run again for re-election in 2012 due to term limits. In 2014, Edgecomb was elected to the Senate from District 1. He announced he would not run for re-election in 2016.

Edgecomb graduated from the University of Maine in Orono in 1963. He later earned an M.A. in education at the University of New Hampshire and was a teacher and principal.

From 2010 to 2012, Edgecomb was co-chairman of the Agriculture, Conservation and Forestry Joint Standing Committee.

His grandson Anthony "A.J." Edgecomb at age 21 became a member of Maine's House of Representatives 127th Maine Legislature. He became the youngest member of Maine's House of Representatives for Maine District 148.
