= Mattie Daughtry =

American politician (born 1987)

119th President of the Maine Senate
- Incumbent
- Assumed office December 4, 2024
- Preceded by: Troy Jackson

Member of the Maine Senate
- Incumbent
- Assumed office December 2, 2020
- Preceded by: Eloise Vitelli
- Constituency: 23rd district (2020–2022); 24th district (2022–present)

Member of the Maine House of Representatives
- In office December 5, 2012 – December 2, 2020
- Preceded by: Alexander Cornell du Houx
- Succeeded by: Poppy Arford
- Constituency: 66th district (2012–2014); 49th district (2014–2020)

Personal details
- Born: 1987 (age 38–39) Brunswick, Maine, U.S.
- Party: Democratic
- Education: Smith College (BFA)
- Website: Official website

Matthea Elisabeth Larsen Daughtry (born March 9, 1987) is an American politician from Maine. She is the President of the Maine Senate. She is a Democrat representing Senate District 23, which serves Brunswick, Chebeague Island, Freeport, Harpswell, Pownal, and part of North Yarmouth. Daughtry served as a representative to the Maine House from District 66 from 2012 to 2016, and District 49 from 2016 to 2020. She has served as a Senator in the Maine Senate since 2020, originally representing District 24.

As Senate President, she is first in line to become Governor of Maine in the event of a vacancy.

== Early life and education ==
Daughtry was born in Brunswick and raised in a politically active family who involved her in volunteering and voter registration. She remembers an early interest in politics and describes campaigning on Maine Street in Brunswick to be President of the United States when she was six years old. Daughtry's godmother was a state representative when Daughtry was young, and Daughtry worked as a page for her godmother at the State House.

Daughtry attended the Maine Coast Waldorf School and Brunswick High School (BHS), enrolling in classes at Bowdoin College while she was a student at BHS. She continued to Smith College where she majored in Studio Art with a focus in photography and sculpture.

While at Smith, Daughtry worked as a freelance photojournalist at the Times Record in Brunswick and trained with Paul Cunningham. Aspiring to work as an NPR on-air personality, she founded and ran the news department at Smith's student radio station, WOZQ 91.9 FM, and interned in the news department at WFCR in Amherst, Massachusetts. Daughtry also worked for Maine 1st district congressman Tom Allen while she was in college.

After graduating from Smith in 2009,, Daughtry worked as a curator for VSA Arts of Maine and did freelance photography work for Michelle Stapleton. She was doing legislative research and following Maine House races as a communications associate and legislative researcher for the Maine's Majority nonprofit when she first decided to run for office.

== Political career ==
=== Maine House of Representatives ===
Daughtry credits her financial difficulties after returning to Maine, and the words of then-governor Paul LePage disparaging young Mainers' financial choices, as a significant motivation for her to run for office. In 2012, when the incumbent state representative for Daughtry's district, Alexander Cornell du Houx, dropped out of the District 66 race following the primary in June, Daughtry decided to run. She won the three-way general election with 45% of the vote, becoming Maine's youngest female legislator at the time.

Daughtry was a member of the Joint Standing Committee on Education and Cultural Affairs and was the House Chair of the Maine Commission on College Affordability and College Completion. On June 12, 2015, Governor Paul LePage vetoed a bill sponsored by Daughtry, LD 537 "An Act To Prohibit Standardized Testing of Children Before Third Grade", as part of his pledge to veto every bill sponsored by a Democrat until they agreed to the elimination of the Maine state income tax. Two days later, the Maine Senate unanimously overruled Governor LePage's veto.

=== Maine Senate ===
Daughtry announced her candidacy for Senate District 24 on January 17, 2020. In July 2020, she defeated Stanley Gerzofsky, who had served the district in both the Maine House and Senate since 2000, in the District 24 Democratic primary with almost 80% of the vote.

In the November general election, Daughtry defeated Republican Brad Pattershall, an attorney, with over 66% of the vote. On February 1, 2021, Maine Senate Democrats elected her to serve as Assistant Senate Majority Leader. She was re-elected to the position in November 2022. In December 2024, Daughtry was unanimously elected President of the Maine Senate. She is the youngest Senate president in Maine history.

== Personal life ==
Daughtry lives in Brunswick with her partner and their coonhound. She co-owns and brews at Moderation Brewing Company in Brunswick, which opened in 2018. Daughtry is also a photographer and writer and owns a media company, Matthea Daughtry Media.

== Electoral record ==
=== Maine House of Representatives ===
2012 Maine House District 66 General Election
Party	Candidate	Votes	%
Democratic	Matthea Daughtry	2,135	45.7%
Green	K. Frederick Horch	1,519	32.5%
Republican	Grant Connors	1,019	21.8%
Total votes		4,673	100.0%

2014 Maine House District 66 Democratic Primary
Party	Candidate	Votes	%
Democratic	Matthea Daughtry		100%
Total votes			100.0%

2014 Maine House District 49 General Election
Party	Candidate	Votes	%
Democratic	Matthea Daughtry	3,144	62.2%
Republican	Michael Stevens	1,599	31.7%
Total votes		4,743	100.0%

2016 Maine House District 49 Primary
Party	Candidate	Votes	%
Democratic	Matthea Daughtry		100%
Total votes			100.0%

2016 Maine House District 49 General Election
Party	Candidate	Votes	%
Democratic	Matthea Daughtry	3,981	66.0%
Republican	Michael Stevens	2,046	34.0%
Total votes		6,027	100.0%

2018 Maine House District 49 Primary
Party	Candidate	Votes	%
Democratic	Matthea Daughtry	1,491	100%
Total votes		1,491	100.0%

2018 Maine House District 49 General Election
Party	Candidate	Votes	%
Democratic	Matthea Daughtry	3,877	70.9%
Republican	Michael Stevens	1,590	29.1%
Total votes		5,467	100.0%

=== Maine State Senate ===
2020 Maine Senate District 24 Primary
Party	Candidate	Votes	%
Democratic	Matthea Daughtry	6,902	79.6%
Democratic	Stan Gerzofsky	1,769	20.4%
Total votes		8,671	100.0%

2020 Maine State Senate District 24 General Election
Party	Candidate	Votes	%
Democratic	Matthea Daughtry (incumbent)	18,297	66.2%
Republican	Brad Pattershall	9,353	33.8%
Total votes		27,650	100%

2022 Maine Senate District 23 (Note: Following the 2020 United States census, legislative districts in Maine were re-drawn. Daughtry's district number switched from 24 to 23.) Democratic Primary
Party	Candidate	Votes	%
Democratic	Matthea Daughtry (incumbent)	3,785	100%
Total votes		3,785	100.0%

2022 Maine State Senate District 23 General Election
Party	Candidate	Votes	%
Democratic	Matthea Daughtry (incumbent)	16,309	70%
Republican	Brogan Teel	7,101	30%
Total votes		23,410	100%

== Notes ==
Political offices
Preceded by Troy Jackson	President of the Maine Senate; 2024–present	Incumbent
