= Jeffrey Pierce (politician) =

American politician

Jeffrey Pierce is an American builder and former politician from Maine.

A graduate of Cony High School in Augusta, Maine, Pierce was elected in 2014 and 2016 before running for a third term in 2018. During that campaign, Democratic opponents revealed that he was convicted of felony drug trafficking in 1983. After being defeated by Democrat Allison Hepler, Pierce was pardoned by outgoing Governor Paul LePage in one of his final acts in that position.
