= Maine's 13th State Senate district =

American legislative district

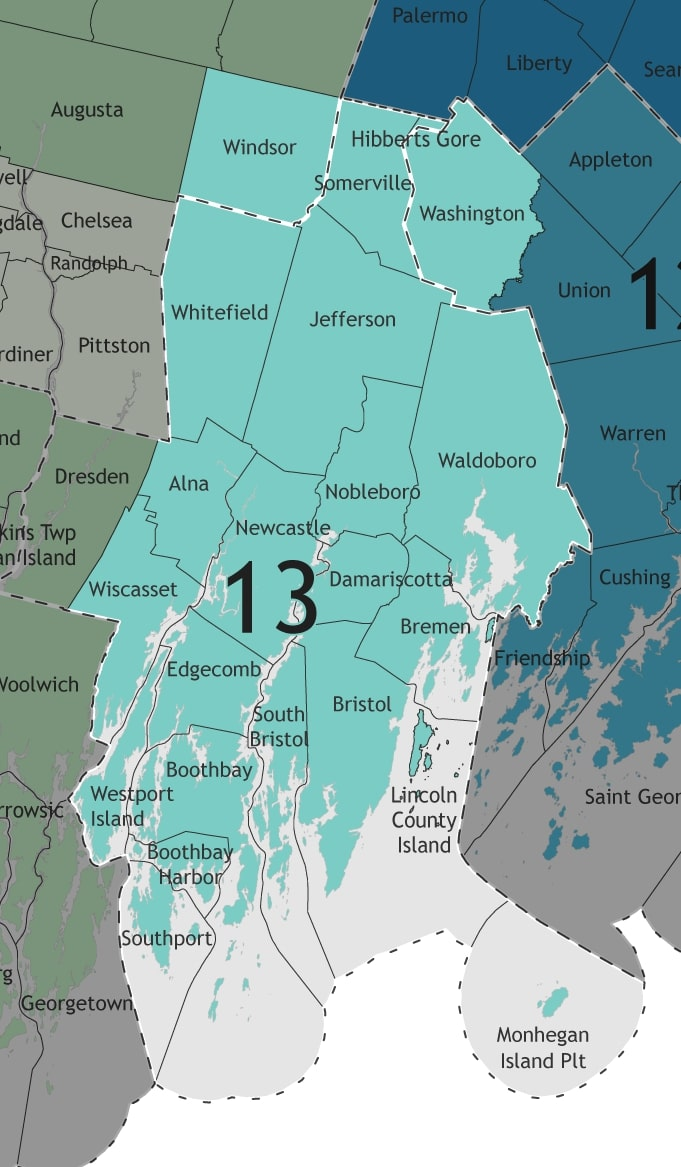
Senator
Cameron Reny; D–Bristol
- Registration: 36.1% Democratic; 29% Republican; 34.9% No party preference
- Population (2020): 38,485

Maine's 13th State Senate district is one of 35 districts in the Maine Senate. It has been represented by Democrat Cameron Reny since 2022.

== Geography ==
District 13 is largely made up of the county of Lincoln, comprising its entirety excluding the town of Dresden. It also includes the town of Washington of Knox County and the town of Windsor of Kennebec County.

Kennebec County - 2.1% of county

Knox County - 3.9% of county

Lincoln County - 95.2% of county

Kennebec:

Town:

- Windsor

Knox:

Town:

- Washington

Lincoln:

Towns:

- Alna
- Boothbay
- Boothbay Harbor
- Bremen
- Bristol
- Damariscotta
- Edgecomb
- Jefferson
- Newcastle
- Nobleboro
- Somerville
- South Bristol
- Southport
- Waldoboro
- Westport Island
- Whitefield
- Wiscasset

== Recent election results ==
=== 2022 ===
2022 Maine State Senate election, District 13
Party	Candidate	Votes	%
Democratic	Cameron Reny	11,970	54.7
Republican	Abden Simmons	9,913	45.3
Total votes		21,883	100.0
Democratic hold			

Elections prior to 2022 were held under different district lines.

=== 2024 ===
2024 Maine State Senate election, District 13
Party	Candidate	Votes	%
Democratic	Cameron Reny	13,896	55.5
Republican	Dale C. Harmon	11,143	44.5
Total votes		25,039	100.0
Democratic hold			

== Historical election results ==
=== 2012 ===
2012 Maine State Senate election, District 13
Party	Candidate	Votes	%
Republican	James Hamper	10,329	53.7
Democratic	Dennise Whitley	8,920	46.3
Total votes		19,249	100
Republican hold			

=== 2014 ===
2014 Maine State Senate election, District 13 (Note: This election was a Democratic hold, as Johnson had been redistricted from the 20th district in early 2014)
Party	Candidate	Votes	%
Democratic	Chris Johnson	9,412	49.1
Republican	Leslie Fossel	9,146	47.4
Blank votes	None	676	3.5
Total votes		19,314	100
Democratic hold			

=== 2016 ===
2018 Maine State Senate election, District 13
Party	Candidate	Votes	%
Republican	Dana Dow	12,131	52.6
Democratic	Chris Johnson	10,909	47.4
Total votes		23,040	100
Republican gain from Democratic			

=== 2018 ===
2018 Maine State Senate election, District 13
Party	Candidate	Votes	%
Republican	Dana Dow	10,266	51
Democratic	Laura Fortman	9,881	49
Total votes		20,147	100
Republican hold			

=== 2020 ===
2020 Maine State Senate election, District 13
Party	Candidate	Votes	%
Democratic	Chloe Maxmin	12,806	51.5
Republican	Dana Dow	12,072	48.5
Independent	Abraham Ober	1	0.0
Total votes		24,879	100
Democratic gain from Republican			
