= Joseph Martin (Maine politician) =

American politician

Member of the Maine Senate from the 19th district
- Incumbent
- Assumed office December 3rd 2024
- Preceded by: Lisa Keim

Personal details
- Party: Republican

Joseph Martin is an American politician from Maine. Martin, a Republican, was elected to the Maine Senate in 2024 (District 19). He is a resident of Rumford. In the Legislature, Martin represents a largely rural district covering the westernmost border of the state, which borders New Hampshire.

Prior to serving in electoral politics, Martin worked as a miner, as part of the international mineral extraction industry, working across many countries in Africa, including the DRC (Zaire at the time), Sierra Leonne, Zimbabwe and Madagascar.

== Unilateral Solicitation Of Select Canadian Provinces To Become US States ==
In August 2025, Martin wrote an open letter nominating himself as "Senator of Maine", inviting the Canadian Provinces of British Columbia, Alberta, Saskatchewan, and Manitoba to become US States, and arguing for the proposition by citing US Christian affiliation, lax gun control laws, a vision of a disempowered Environmental Protection Agency, and removal of censure for hate speech and prohibitions against religion in public schools, among others suggested benefits. This invitation was unilateral, and not the product of the government of the State of Maine, or the US Federal government. Responses to Martin's proposal have been hostile, including that of the Canadian member of Parliament from Ontario, Charlie Angus, saying:

You know, when I heard that you'd sent out these mimograph letters to elected legislators across Western Canada asking them to commit treason, to sell out their nation, to give up their sovereignty, I thought it was a joke, honestly.

Of Martin's proposal, Member of the British Columbia Legislative Assembly Brennan Day said:

We have got a lot of work to do in improving our services, and making sure that we are spending our money wisely, and getting good value for it, but I don’t think anybody here looks south and goes, ‘we want more of that'.
