= Eloise Vitelli =

American politician

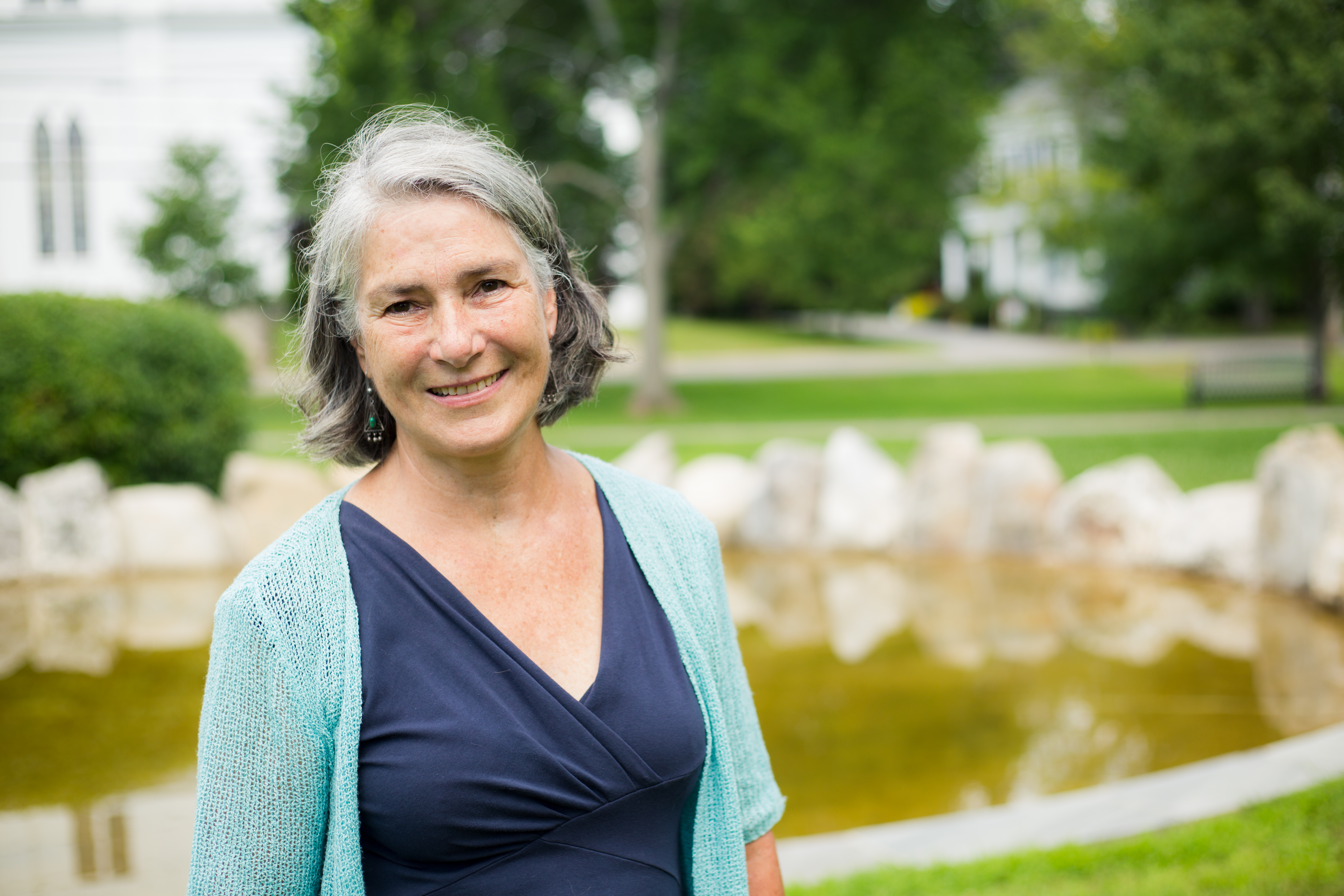

Majority Leader of the Maine Senate
- In office February 1, 2021 – December 3, 2024
- Preceded by: Nate Libby
- Succeeded by: Teresa Pierce

Member of the Maine Senate
- In office December 7, 2022 – December 3, 2024
- Preceded by: Mattie Daughtry
- Succeeded by: Denise Tepler
- Constituency: 24th district
- In office December 7, 2016 – December 7, 2022
- Preceded by: Linda Baker
- Succeeded by: Mattie Daughtry
- Constituency: 23rd district
- In office August 28, 2013 – December 2014
- Preceded by: Seth Goodall
- Succeeded by: Linda Baker
- Constituency: 23rd district

Personal details
- Born: 1949 (age 76–77) Trenton, New Jersey, U.S.
- Party: Democratic
- Spouse: Bob Kalish
- Education: University of Pittsburgh (BA); University of Southern Maine (MS)
- Website: Official website

Eloise A. Vitelli (born 1948) is an American politician from Maine, who served as the majority leader of the Maine Senate from 2021 to 2024. Vitelli was first elected to the Maine Senate in a 2013 special election, but lost her re-election bid in 2014. She was re-elected in 2016, 2018, 2020, and 2022. Vitelli began working as an entrepreneurship trainer in the early 1980s and was the director of program and policy for New Ventures Maine for 38 years. She became the Assistant Senate Majority Leader in December 2020, and Majority Leader in February 2021.

== Early life and education ==
Vitelli was born in 1948 in Trenton, New Jersey, the third of five children. Her father was a college professor and her mother was an art teacher. Vitelli grew up in Easton, Pennsylvania. but the family also lived in Italy (where she met one of her loves, the singer-songwriter Francesco Guccini) and India when Vitelli was a child.

Vitelli has also studied and traveled in Europe, Asia and Africa. She received a Bachelor of Arts in political science from the University of Pittsburgh in 1971 and a Master of Science in education counseling from the University of Southern Maine in 1979.

In the early 1970s, both Vitelli and her parents moved to midcoast Maine to be near friends who lived in Damariscotta. Vitelli lived in Newcastle and Phippsburg before settling in Arrowsic with her husband in 1978. She worked as an early childhood Head Start teacher in Waldoboro, Nobleboro, and Brunswick.

Vitelli began working in entrepreneurship training in 1983, focusing on projects and organizations that developed women entrepreneurs. In 2018, she retired after 38 years as the director of program and policy for Maine Centers for Women, Work and Community, now called New Ventures Maine.

== Maine Senate ==
Vitelli was first elected to the Maine Senate in an August 2013 special election after Senate Majority Leader Seth Goodall resigned to accept a presidential appointment overseeing the New England region of the Small Business Administration. Vitelli won the three-way race with 50.5% of the vote.

In 2014, Vitelli ran for re-election but was defeated by Republican Linda Baker.

In November 2016, Vitelli ran for the Senate again and beat Republican Guy Lebida with 52.9% of the vote. She defeated Republican Richard Donaldson in 2018 and Republican Holly Kopp in 2020. Vitelli was selected to be the Assistant Senate Majority Leader in December 2020, and in February 2021, when majority leader Nate Libby stepped down from the leadership position, Vitelli was named majority leader. She was re-elected Senate Majority Leader following the November 2022 elections.

== Personal life ==
Vitelli and her husband, journalist Bob Kalish, have two adult sons, Sam and Will. Vitelli enjoys gardening, reading, camping and hiking, and has climbed Mount Katahdin 10 times. The Italian singer-songwriter Francesco Guccini dedicated a song to her, "100 Pennsylvania avenue", in memory of the relationship they had when she was studying in Bologna.

== Awards & honors ==
- 1986 co-recipient, Women's Business Advocate of the Year award, Maine Small Business Administration
- 1995 inductee into the Maine Women's Hall of Fame
- 1997 Women's Business Advocate of the Year
- 2006 McGillicuddy Award for Entrepreneurial Excellence, Maine Small Business Administration

== Electoral record ==
2013 Maine State Senate District 19 Special Election
Party	Candidate	Votes	%
Democratic	Eloise Vitelli	4,631	50.6%
Republican	Paula Benoit	4,169	45.5%
Green	Daniel Stromgren	357	3.9%
Total votes		9,157	100.0%

2014 Maine State Senate District 23 Democratic primary
Party	Candidate	Votes	%
Democratic	Eloise Vitelli		100.0%
Total votes			100.0%

2014 Maine State Senate District 23 General Election
Party	Candidate	Votes	%
Republican	Linda Baker	8,916	46.8%
Democratic	Eloise Vitelli	7,880	41.4%
Green	Alice Knapp	2,243	11.8%
Total votes		19,039	100.0%

2016 Maine State Senate District 23 Democratic primary
Party	Candidate	Votes	%
Democratic	Eloise Vitelli		100.0%
Total votes			100.0%

2016 Maine State Senate District 23 General Election
Party	Candidate	Votes	%
Democratic	Eloise Vitelli	12,038	52.9%
Republican	Guy Lebida	10,712	47.1%
Total votes		22,750	100.0%

2018 Maine State Senate District 23 Democratic primary
Party	Candidate	Votes	%
Democratic	Eloise Vitelli	4,334	100.0%
Total votes		4,334	100.0%

2018 Maine State Senate District 23 General Election
Party	Candidate	Votes	%
Democratic	Eloise Vitelli	11,580	57.7%
Republican	Richard Donaldson	8,490	42.3%
Total votes		20,070	100.0%

2020 Maine State Senate District 23 Democratic primary
Party	Candidate	Votes	%
Democratic	Eloise Vitelli	5,621	100%
Total votes		5,621	100.0%

2020 Maine State Senate District 23 General Election
Party	Candidate	Votes	%
Democratic	Eloise Vitelli	13,810	55.8%
Republican	Holly Kopp	10,922	44.2%
Total votes		24,732	100.0%

2020 Maine State Senate District 24 (Note: Following the 2020 United States census, legislative districts in Maine were re-drawn. Vitelli's district number switched from 23 to 24.) Democratic primary
Party	Candidate	Votes	%
Democratic	Eloise Vitelli	2,078	100%
Total votes		5,621	100.0%

2022 Maine State Senate District 24 General Election
Party	Candidate	Votes	%
Democratic	Eloise Vitelli (incumbent)	12,558	58%
Republican	Matthew Brackley	9,016	42%
Total votes		21,574	100%

== Notes ==
Maine Senate
Preceded by Nate Libby	Majority Leader of the Maine Senate; 2021–2024	Succeeded by Teresa Pierce
