= Tom Saviello =

American politician

Thomas B. Saviello

Member of the Maine Senate from the 17th district
- In office 2010–2018
- Preceded by: Walter Gooley
- Succeeded by: Russell Black

Personal details
- Born: August 29, 1950 (age 75) Englewood, New Jersey
- Party: Republican (2009–present)
- Other political affiliations: Democratic (until 2009)
- Profession: Forester

Thomas B. Saviello (born August 29, 1950) is an American politician. Saviello is a Republican former State Senator from Maine's 17th District, representing part of Kennebec and Franklin Counties, including the population center of Farmington and his residence in Wilton. He was first elected to the Maine State Senate in 2010 after serving for 8 years (4 terms) in the Maine House of Representatives and two years on the District 9 School Board. His private experience is primarily in the field of forestry; Saviello works as a manager for International Paper. He was born in Englewood, New Jersey and is a graduate of the University of Tennessee and the University of Maine.

First elected as a Democrat, Saviello is known to cross party lines on measures and draw the ire of more conservative Republicans, including Governor Paul LePage. As a Republican, he supported Democrat Jared Golden in his 2018 campaign for Congress against incumbent Republican Bruce Poliquin. In 2017, he helped fundraise for Democratic gubernatorial candidate Janet Mills.

Maine House of Representatives
Preceded by Charles C. Laverdiere	Member of the Maine House of Representatives from the 77th district 2002–2004	Succeeded by Lisa Marrache
Preceded by Elaine Makas	Member of the Maine House of Representatives from the 90th district 2004–2010	Succeeded by Russell Black
Maine Senate
Preceded by Walter Gooley	Member of the Maine Senate from the 18th district 2010–2014	Succeeded by John Patrick
Preceded by Garrett Mason	Member of the Maine Senate from the 17th district 2014–2018	Succeeded by Russell Black
