= 2016 Maine Senate election =

- November 8, 2016

All 35 seats in the Maine Senate 18 seats needed for a majority
	Majority party	Minority party
Leader	Michael Thibodeau	Justin Alfond (term-limited)
Party	Republican	Democratic
Leader since	December 5, 2012	December 5, 2012
Leader's seat	11th - Winterport	27th - Portland
Last election	20	15
Seats before	20	15
Seats won	18	17
Seat change	▼2	▲2
Popular vote	361,796	349,545
Percentage	49.18%	47.51%
- Results: Republican hold Republican gain Democratic hold Democratic gain
Senate President before election
Michael Thibodeau
Republican
Elected Senate President
Michael Thibodeau
Republican

The 2016 Maine State Senate election was held on Tuesday, November 8, 2016, with the primary election being held on June 14, 2016, to elect the 128th Maine Senate. Voters in all 35 districts of the Maine State Senate will elect their senators. The election coincided with the elections for other offices, including for President, U.S. House and the Maine House of Representatives.

== Results summary ==
Party	Candi- dates	Votes		Seats		
Party	Candi- dates	No.	%	No.	+/–	%
Republican Party	33	361,796	49.177%	29	▼2	51.4%
Democratic Party	34	349,545	47.512%	21	▲2	48.6%
Independent	3	20,653	2.807%	0	Steady	0%
Green Party	1	3,712	0.505%	0	Steady	0%
Total	71	735,706	100.00%	50	Steady	100.00%

Senate seats
Republican	51.4%
Democratic	48.6%

Popular vote
Republican	49.177%
Democratic	47.512%
Independent	2.807%
Green	0.505%

=== Incumbents defeated in primary election ===
- Linda Baker (R-District 23), defeated by Guy Lebida (R)

=== Incumbents defeated in general election ===
- Chris Johnson (D-District 13), defeated by Dana Dow (R)
- John Patrick (D-District 18), defeated by Lisa Keim (R)

=== Open seats that changed parties ===
- Peter Edgecomb (R-District 1) didn't seek re-election, seat won by Troy Jackson (D)
- Michael Willette (R-District 2) didn't seek re-election, seat won by Michael Carpenter (D)
- Earle McCormick (R-District 14) didn't seek re-election, seat won by Shenna Bellows (D)
- Linda Baker (R-District 23) lost re-nomination, seat won by Eloise Vitelli (D)

== Predictions ==
Source	Ranking	As of
Governing	Tossup	October 12, 2016

== Detailed results ==
=== Districts 1-18 ===
==== District 1 ====
Incumbent Republican Peter Edgecomb has represented the 1st district since 2014. Edgecomb didn't seek re-election. Former senator Troy Jackson won the open seat.

Maine State Senate 1st District general election, 2016
Party	Candidate	Votes	%
Democratic	Troy Jackson	9,589	51.53%
Republican	Timothy Guerrette	9,018	48.47%
Total votes		18,607	100%
Democratic gain from Republican			

==== District 2 ====
Incumbent Republican Michael Willette has represented the 2nd district since 2014. Willette didn't seek re-election. Democrat Michael Carpenter won the open seat.

Maine State Senate 2nd District general election, 2016
Party	Candidate	Votes	%
Democratic	Michael Carpenter	9,899	52.34%
Republican	Ricky Long	9,013	47.66%
Total votes		18,912	100%
Democratic gain from Republican			

==== District 3 ====
Incumbent Republican Rodney Whittemore has represented the 3rd district and its predecessors since 2010.

Maine State Senate 3rd District general election, 2016
Party	Candidate	Votes	%
Republican	Rodney Whittemore (incumbent)	9,981	53.84%
Democratic	Jeffrey McCabe	8,557	46.16%
Total votes		18,538	100%
Republican hold			

==== District 4 ====
Incumbent Republican Paul Davis has represented the 4th district since 2014.

Maine State Senate 4th District general election, 2016
Party	Candidate	Votes	%
Republican	Paul Davis (incumbent)	13,525	72.47%
Democratic	Carole Boothroyd	5,137	27.53%
Total votes		18,662	100%
Republican hold			

==== District 5 ====
Incumbent Democrat Jim Dill has represented the 5th district since 2014.

Maine State Senate 5th District general election, 2016
Party	Candidate	Votes	%
Democratic	Jim Dill (incumbent)	12,117	62.59%
Republican	Brett Baber	7,241	37.41%
Total votes		19,358	100%
Democratic hold			

==== District 6 ====
Incumbent Republican David Burns has represented the 6th district since 2012. Burns didn't seek re-election. State Representative Joyce Maker won the open seat.

Maine State Senate 6th District general election, 2016
Party	Candidate	Votes	%
Republican	Joyce Maker	10,349	56.23%
Democratic	Rock Alley	8,057	43.77%
Total votes		18,406	100%
Republican hold			

==== District 7 ====
Incumbent Republican Brian Langley has represented the 7th district and its predecessors since 2010.

Maine State Senate 7th District general election, 2016
Party	Candidate	Votes	%
Republican	Brian Langley (incumbent)	13,218	55.79%
Democratic	Moira O'Neill	10,476	44.21%
Total votes		23,694	100%
Republican hold			

==== District 8 ====
Incumbent Republican Kimberly Rosen has represented the 8th district since 2014.

Maine State Senate 8th District general election, 2016
Party	Candidate	Votes	%
Republican	Kimberley Rosen (incumbent)	18,448	99.85%
Democratic	Michael Aiguier (write-in)	27	0.15%
Total votes		18,475	100%
Republican hold			

==== District 9 ====
Incumbent Democrat Geoffrey Gratwick has represented the 9th district and its predecessors since 2012.

Maine State Senate 9th District general election, 2016
Party	Candidate	Votes	%
Democratic	Geoffrey Gratwick (incumbent)	10,962	58.08%
Republican	N. Laurence Willey Jr.	7,911	41.92%
Total votes		18,873	100%
Democratic hold			

==== District 10 ====
Incumbent Republican Andre Cushing III has represented the 10th district and its predecessors since 2012.

Maine State Senate 10th District general election, 2016
Party	Candidate	Votes	%
Republican	Andre Cushing III (incumbent)	11,305	57.24%
Independent	Dennis Marble	8,445	42.76%
Total votes		19,750	100%
Republican hold			

==== District 11 ====
Incumbent Republican Senate President Michael Thibodeau has represented the 11th district and its predecessors since 2010.

Maine State Senate 11th District general election, 2016
Party	Candidate	Votes	%
Republican	Michael Thibodeau (incumbent)	11,947	51.75%
Democratic	Jonathan Fulford	11,138	48.25%
Total votes		23,085	100%
Republican hold			

==== District 12 ====
Incumbent Democrat David Miramant has represented the 12th district since 2014.

Maine State Senate 12th District general election, 2016
Party	Candidate	Votes	%
Democratic	David Miramant (incumbent)	11,608	51.75%
Republican	David Emery	10,823	48.25%
Total votes		22,431	100%
Democratic hold			

==== District 13 ====
Incumbent Democrat Chris Johnson has represented the 13th district and its predecessors since 2012. Johnson lost re-election to Republican Dana Dow.

Maine State Senate 13th District general election, 2016
Party	Candidate	Votes	%
Republican	Dana Dow	12,131	52.65%
Democratic	Chris Johnson (incumbent)	10,909	47.35%
Total votes		23,040	100%
Republican gain from Democratic			

==== District 14 ====
Incumbent Republican Earle McCormick has represented the 14th district since 2014. McCormick didn't seek re-election.

Maine State Senate 14th District general election, 2016
Party	Candidate	Votes	%
Democratic	Shenna Bellows	9,816	44.80%
Republican	Bryan Cutchen	8,082	36.89%
Independent	Joseph Pietroski	4,012	18.31%
Total votes		21,910	100%
Democratic gain from Republican			

==== District 15 ====
Incumbent Republican Roger Katz has represented the 15th district and its predecessors since 2010.

Maine State Senate 15th District general election, 2016
Party	Candidate	Votes	%
Republican	Roger Katz (incumbent)	15,154	77.04%
Democratic	Henry Dilts	4,516	22.96%
Total votes		19,670	100%
Republican hold			

==== District 16 ====
Incumbent Republican Scott Cyrway has represented the 16th district since 2014.

Maine State Senate 16th District general election, 2016
Party	Candidate	Votes	%
Republican	Scott Cyrway (incumbent)	10,378	53.98%
Democratic	Henry Beck	8,846	46.02%
Total votes		19,224	100%
Republican hold			

==== District 17 ====
Incumbent Republican Tom Saviello has represented the 17th district and its predecessors since 2010.

Maine State Senate 17th District general election, 2016
Party	Candidate	Votes	%
Republican	Tom Saviello (incumbent)	14,975	72.25%
Democratic	Joanne Dunlap	5,752	27.75%
Total votes		20,727	100%
Republican hold			

==== District 18 ====
Incumbent Democrat John Patrick has represented the 18th district and its predecessors since 2010. He lost re-election to Republican Lisa Keim.

Maine State Senate 18th District general election, 2016
Party	Candidate	Votes	%
Republican	Lisa Keim	11,603	56.21%
Democratic	John Patrick (incumbent)	9,040	43.79%
Total votes		20,643	100%
Republican gain from Democratic			

=== Districts 19-35 ===
==== District 19 ====
Incumbent Republican James Hamper has represented the 19th district and its predecessors since 2012.

Maine State Senate 19th District general election, 2016
Party	Candidate	Votes	%
Republican	James Hamper (incumbent)	13,396	64.82%
Democratic	Joseph Chisari	7,272	35.18%
Total votes		20,668	100%
Republican hold			

==== District 20 ====
Incumbent Republican Eric Brakey has represented the 20th district since 2014.

Maine State Senate 20th District general election, 2016
Party	Candidate	Votes	%
Republican	Eric Brakey (incumbent)	13,047	61.37%
Democratic	Kimberly Sampson	8,214	38.63%
Total votes		21,261	100%
Republican hold			

==== District 21 ====
Incumbent Democrat Nate Libby has represented the 21st district since 2014. Libby was unopposed for re-election.

Maine State Senate 21st District general election, 2016
Party	Candidate	Votes	%
Democratic	Nate Libby (incumbent)	14,063	100%
Total votes		14,063	100%
Democratic hold			

==== District 22 ====
Incumbent Republican Garrett Mason has represented the 22nd district and its predecessors since 2010.

Maine State Senate 22nd District general election, 2016
Party	Candidate	Votes	%
Republican	Garrett Mason (incumbent)	13,774	67.02%
Democratic	Richard Fochtmann	6,777	32.98%
Total votes		20,551	100%
Republican hold			

==== District 23 ====
Incumbent Republican Linda Baker has represented the 23rd district since 2014. Baker lost re-nomination to fellow Republican Guy Lebida. Former senator Eloise Vitelli defeated Lebida in the general election.

Maine State Senate 23rd District general election, 2016
Party	Candidate	Votes	%
Democratic	Eloise Vitelli	12,038	52.91%
Republican	Guy Lebida	10,712	47.09%
Total votes		22,750	100%
Democratic gain from Republican			

==== District 24 ====
Incumbent Democrat Stanley Gerzofsky has represented the 24th district and its predecessors since 2008. Gerzofsky was term-limited. Democrat Everett "Brownie" Carson won the open seat.

Maine State Senate 24th District general election, 2016
Party	Candidate	Votes	%
Democratic	Everett "Brownie" Carson	14,833	59.60%
Republican	Tristam Coffin	10,056	40.40%
Total votes		24,889	100%
Democratic hold			

==== District 25 ====
Incumbent Democrat Cathy Breen has represented the 25th district since 2014.

Maine State Senate 25th District general election, 2016
Party	Candidate	Votes	%
Democratic	Cathy Breen (incumbent)	15,546	58.02%
Republican	C. Barton Ladd	11,247	41.98%
Total votes		26,793	100%
Democratic hold			

==== District 26 ====
Incumbent Democrat Bill Diamond has represented the 26th district since 2014.

Maine State Senate 26th District general election, 2016
Party	Candidate	Votes	%
Democratic	Bill Diamond (incumbent)	13,081	61.97%
Republican	Ryan McDonald	8,026	38.03%
Total votes		21,107	100%
Democratic hold			

==== District 27 ====
Incumbent Democratic Minority Leader Justin Alfond has represented the 27th district and its predecessors since 2008. Alfond was term-limited. State Representative Ben Chipman won the open seat.

Maine State Senate 27th District general election, 2016
Party	Candidate	Votes	%
Democratic	Ben Chipman	14,929	67.24%
Green	Seth Baker	3,712	16.72%
Republican	Adam Pontius	3,562	16.04%
Total votes		22,203	100%
Democratic hold			

==== District 28 ====
Incumbent Democrat Anne Haskell has represented the 28th district and its predecessors district since 2012. Haskell didn't seek re-election. State Representative Mark Dion won the open seat.

Maine State Senate 28th District general election, 2016
Party	Candidate	Votes	%
Democratic	Mark Dion	15,375	71.39%
Republican	Karen Usher	6,161	28.61%
Total votes		21,536	100%
Democratic hold			

==== District 29 ====
Incumbent Democrat Rebecca Millett has represented the 29th district since 2012.

Maine State Senate 29th District general election, 2016
Party	Candidate	Votes	%
Democratic	Rebecca Millett (incumbent)	13,684	62.54%
Independent	Martha MacAuslan	8,196	37.46%
Total votes		21,880	100%
Democratic hold			

==== District 30 ====
Incumbent Republican Amy Volk has represented the 30th district since 2014.

Maine State Senate 30th District general election, 2016
Party	Candidate	Votes	%
Republican	Amy Volk (incumbent)	14,621	59.48%
Democratic	Jean-Marie Caterina	9,960	40.52%
Total votes		24,581	100%
Republican hold			

==== District 31 ====
Incumbent Democrat Linda Valentino has represented the 31st district and its predecessors since 2012. Valentino didn't seek re-election. State Representative Justin Chenette won the open seat.

Maine State Senate 31st District general election, 2016
Party	Candidate	Votes	%
Democratic	Justin Chenette	12,332	57.69%
Republican	Timothy Sevigny	9,043	42.31%
Total votes		21,375	100%
Democratic hold			

==== District 32 ====
Incumbent Democrat Susan Deschambault has represented the 32nd district since her appointment on April 5, 2016. Deschambault was elected to a full term.

Maine State Senate 32nd District general election, 2016
Party	Candidate	Votes	%
Democratic	Susan Deschambault (incumbent)	11,880	59.02%
Republican	Matthew Stone	8,249	40.98%
Total votes		20,129	100%
Democratic hold			

==== District 33 ====
Incumbent Republican David Woodsome has represented the 33rd district since 2014.

Maine State Senate 33rd District general election, 2016
Party	Candidate	Votes	%
Republican	David Woodsome (incumbent)	11,672	59.57%
Democratic	Andrea Boland	7,922	40.43%
Total votes		19,594	100%
Republican hold			

==== District 34 ====
Incumbent Republican Ronald Collins has represented the 34th district and its predecessors since 2010.

Maine State Senate 34th District general election, 2016
Party	Candidate	Votes	%
Republican	Ronald Collins (incumbent)	13,164	55.43%
Democratic	Jonathan Kilbourn	10,584	44.57%
Total votes		23,748	100%
Republican hold			

==== District 35 ====
Incumbent Democrat Dawn Hill has represented the 35th district and its predecessors since 2010.

Maine State Senate 35th District general election, 2016
Party	Candidate	Votes	%
Democratic	Dawn Hill (incumbent)	14,609	59.45%
Republican	Theodor Short	9,964	40.55%
Total votes		24,573	100%
Democratic hold			

== See also ==
- List of Maine state legislatures
