= Garrett Mason =

American politician (born 1985)

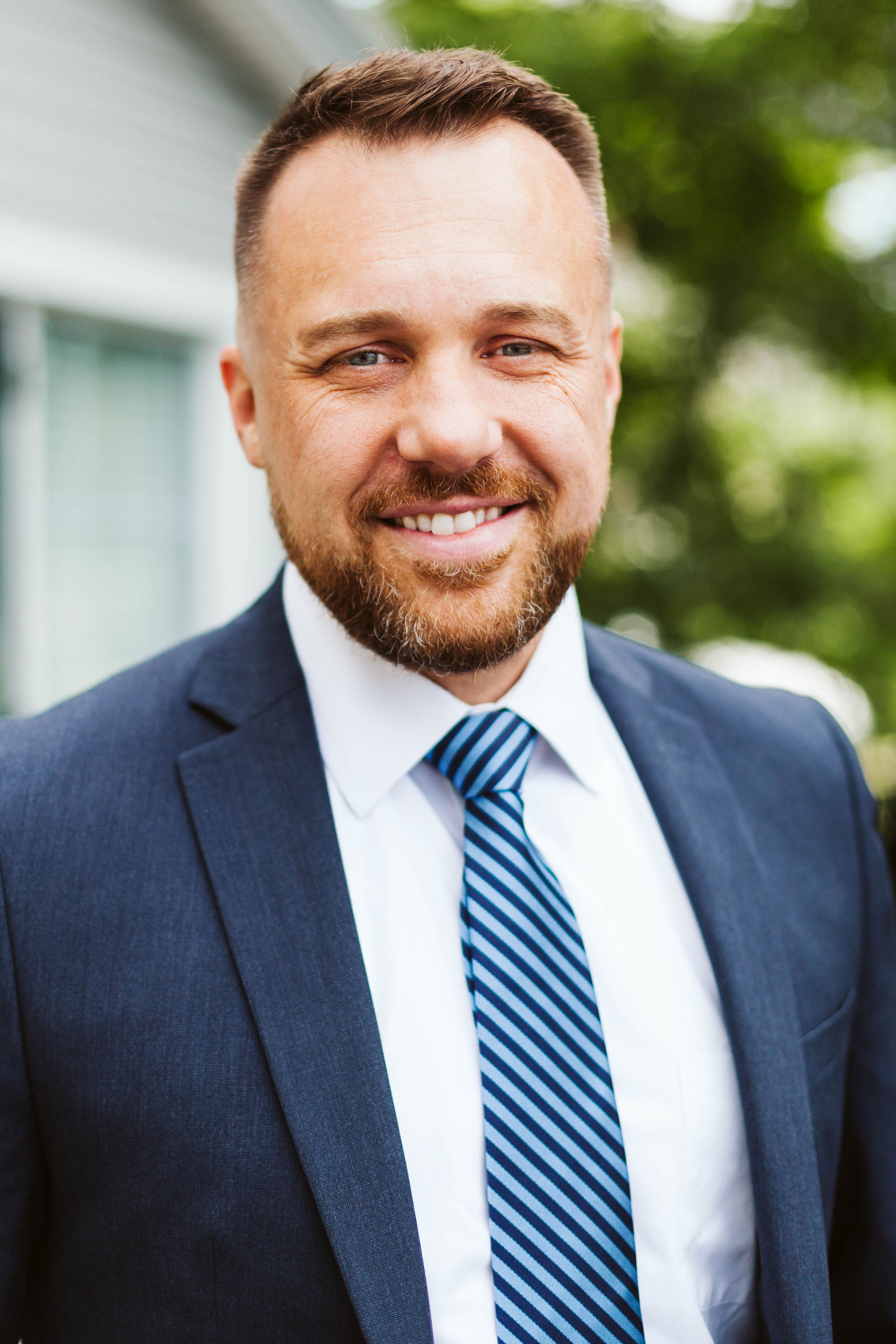
- Mason in 2023

Member of the Androscoggin County Commission from the 4th district
- Incumbent
- Assumed office January 2021
- Preceded by: Isaiah Lary

Majority Leader of the Maine Senate
- In office December 3, 2014 – December 5, 2018
- Preceded by: Troy Jackson
- Succeeded by: Nate Libby

Member of the Maine Senate from the 22nd district
- In office December 3, 2014 – December 5, 2018
- Preceded by: Edward Mazurek
- Succeeded by: Jeff Timberlake

Member of the Maine Senate from the 17th district
- In office December 8, 2010 – December 3, 2014
- Preceded by: John Nutting
- Succeeded by: Thomas Saviello

Personal details
- Born: Garrett Paul Mason; June 19, 1985 (age 41) Lewiston, Maine, U.S.
- Party: Republican
- Spouse: Rebekah Lynch
- Children: 1
- Education: Pensacola Christian College (BA); Southern New Hampshire University (attended); Art Institute of Pittsburgh (attended)

Garrett Paul Mason (born June 19, 1985) is an American Republican politician and businessman from Maine. He has served as an Androscoggin County Commissioner since 2021, after previously representing Districts 17 and 22 in the Maine Senate from 2010 to 2018, where he was elected Majority Leader. Mason was a candidate in the 2018 Republican gubernatorial primary where he finished second, and in the 2026 Republican gubernatorial primary, where he finished fourth.

== Early life and career ==
Mason was born on June 19, 1985, in Lewiston, Maine, and graduated from Calvary Christian Academy in Turner in 2003. He earned a Bachelor of Arts in marketing from Pensacola Christian College in Pensacola, Florida, in 2006.

Before entering politics, Mason worked in sports management. He was employed by the Portland Sea Dogs, a Double-A baseball team, and later served as director of administration for the Lewiston Maineiacs of the Quebec Major Junior Hockey League.

In 2018, Pensacola Christian College awarded him an honorary doctorate in Humanities.

== Political career ==
Mason began his political career in 2010, when at the age of 25 he was elected to the Maine Senate after defeating 18-year incumbent John Nutting. He went on to represent District 17 until 2014 and District 22 from 2014 to 2018. Mason was re-elected in 2012 by 28 votes over Democrat Colleen Quint of Minot.

During his first term, Mason sponsored legislation to allow charter schools in Maine, which was signed into law by Governor Paul LePage in June 2011.

After Republicans took control of the Maine Senate in 2014, Mason was elected by his colleagues as Senate Majority Leader, a position he held until he was term-limited in 2018. That year, he ran for Governor of Maine, finishing second to Shawn Moody in the Republican primary.

In January 2021, Mason was appointed to the Androscoggin County Commission to fill the vacancy left by Isaiah Lary. He was elected to a full four-year term in 2024, with that term set to expire on December 31, 2028.

Mason announced a second campaign for governor on January 7, 2026, receiving the backing of allies of Vice President JD Vance. Mason ultimately finished fourth in the primary, some distance behind Robert B. Charles, Ben Midgley, and Jonathan S. Bush. He posted on X that the 2026 race would be "the final statewide campaign" of his career.

== Electoral history ==
=== Maine Senate District 17 Republican primary, 2010 ===
| Candidate | Party | Votes | % |
|---|---|---|---|
| Garrett Mason | Republican Party | 1,975 | 58.0% |
| Russell W. Pack | Republican Party | 1,432 | 42.0% |

=== Maine Senate District 17 general election, 2010 ===
| Candidate | Party | Votes | % |
|---|---|---|---|
| Garrett Mason | Republican Party | 9,047 | 55.7% |
| John Nutting (incumbent) | Democratic Party | 7,357 | 44.3% |
| Blank votes | — | 1,275 | — |

=== Maine Senate District 17 general election, 2012 ===
| Candidate | Party | Votes | % |
|---|---|---|---|
| Garrett Mason (incumbent) | Republican Party | 9,818 | 50.1% |
| Colleen Quint | Democratic Party | 9,790 | 49.9% |
| Blank votes | — | 1,100 | — |

=== Maine Senate District 22 general election, 2014 ===
| Candidate | Party | Votes | % |
|---|---|---|---|
| Garrett Mason (incumbent) | Republican Party | 9,633 | 57.0% |
| Guy Desjardins | Democratic Party | 7,264 | 43.0% |
| Blank votes | — | 847 | — |

=== Maine Senate District 22 general election, 2016 ===
| Candidate | Party | Votes | % |
|---|---|---|---|
| Garrett Mason (incumbent) | Republican Party | 13,774 | 67.0% |
| Richard N. Fochtmann | Democratic Party | 6,777 | 33.0% |
| Blank votes | — | 987 | — |

=== Maine Republican gubernatorial primary, 2018 ===
| Candidate | Party | Votes | % |
|---|---|---|---|
| Shawn Moody | Republican Party | 53,436 | 56.0% |
| Garrett Mason | Republican Party | 21,571 | 22.6% |
| Mary Mayhew | Republican Party | 14,034 | 14.7% |
| Kenneth Fredette | Republican Party | 5,341 | 5.6% |

=== Androscoggin County Commissioner District 4 general election, 2022 ===
| Candidate | Party | Votes | % |
|---|---|---|---|
| Garrett Mason | Republican Party | 4,375 | 61.3% |
| Gregory F. Bianconi | Democratic Party | 2,763 | 38.7% |
| Blank votes | — | 248 | — |

=== Androscoggin County Commissioner District 4 general election, 2024 ===
| Candidate | Party | Votes | % |
|---|---|---|---|
| Garrett Mason (incumbent) | Republican Party | 7,126 | 76.9% |
| Blank votes | — | 2,144 | 23.1% |

== Professional career ==
Outside of politics, Mason has been active in business and media. He founded Dirigo Public Affairs, a public relations and crisis management firm, and has worked with clients across New England.

He has also been involved in real estate development and other entrepreneurial ventures.

In addition, Mason appears as a conservative political commentator on News Center Maine, Maine’s NBC affiliate, where he provides analysis on state and national politics.

== Family ==
Mason's mother Gina Mason and their cousin Dale J. Crafts also served in the Maine Legislature. After his mother died in September 2017, his father Rick Mason won a special election to fill her vacant seat.

Maine Senate
| Preceded by Troy Jackson | Majority Leader of the Maine Senate; 2014–2018 | Succeeded by Nate Libby |
