= Nate Libby =

American politician

Majority Leader of the Maine Senate
- In office December 7, 2018 – February 1, 2021
- Preceded by: Garrett Mason
- Succeeded by: Eloise Vitelli

Member of the Maine Senate from the 21 district
- In office December 3, 2014 – December 7, 2022
- Preceded by: Patrick Flood
- Succeeded by: Magaret Rotundo

Member of the Maine House of Representatives from the 73rd district
- In office December 5, 2012 – December 3, 2014
- Preceded by: Richard Wagner
- Succeeded by: Lloyd Herrick

Personal details
- Born: New Hampshire, U.S.
- Party: Democratic
- Spouse: Andrea Libby (divorced)
- Children: 2 (1 with Andrea)
- Education: Bates College (BA) University of Southern Maine (MBA)

Nathan Libby is an American Democratic former politician from Maine. He represented Senate District 21, which serves Lewiston, Maine's second-largest city. Libby grew up in central Maine and attended Bates College where he majored in history and economics. He also holds a Master of Business Administration from the University of Southern Maine and most recently worked as economic development director for the city of Lewiston before his 2026 firing. Libby served one term in the Maine House of Representatives from 2012 to 2014 and was first elected to the Maine Senate in 2014. He served as the Senate majority leader from 2018-2020.

== Early life and education ==
Libby grew up outside of Waterville, Maine and attended Skowhegan Area High School, graduating in 2003. He attended Bates College, where he completed a Bachelor of Arts in history and economics in 2007. He was the first in his family to attend college. In 2020, Libby received a Master of Business Administration from the University of Southern Maine.

== Political career ==
Libby served on the Lewiston city council from 2011-2015 and has chaired Lewiston’s Universally Accessible Playground committee since 2016. He was elected to the Maine House of Representatives in 2012 and represented District 73 (now District 60) for two years.

On Friday, February 14, 2014, Libby announced he would seek the District 21 Senate seat held by Margaret Craven, who had just announced she would not seek re-election. In November 2014, he beat Republican Patti Gagne by less than 100 votes.

Libby ran unopposed in the 2016 Democratic primary, the 2016 general election and the 2018 Democratic primary. In the 2018 general election, he beat Republican Nelson Peters Jr. 60%-40%, and his Democratic peers unanimously elected him Senate majority leader.

November 2020, Libby was again selected as Senate majority leader. In early 2021, citing increasing professional and family obligations, Libby resigned his leadership position but remained in the District 21 seat..

Libby has served on the Government Oversight Committee, the Taxation Committee and the State and Local Government Committee.

In July 2021, after Lewiston City Councilor Safiya Khalid alleged racism at a meeting of the Lewiston Democratic Party, Libby dismissed her complaints and suggested Khalid's opponents were not racist.

== Personal life ==
Libby was married to his ex-wife, Andrea, a registered nurse. He has one son with his ex-wife, and one from a prior relationship. Libby enjoys carpentry, gardening, landscaping, and outdoor excursions with his family. He works as an economic development consultant, and in December 2020 was named president of Community Concepts Finance Corporation.

In April 2024, Libby was hired as assistant economic development director for the city of Lewiston. Later that year, he was promoted to economic development director. Less than two years later, Libby was fired from his position with the city of Lewiston.

== Awards & honors ==
- 2015 Homecare and Hospice Alliance of Maine Advocate of the Year award
- 2016 Young Professionals of Lewiston and Auburn Civic Leader award
- 2017 Uplift LA Local Hero award
- 2017 American Legion of Maine Legislator of the Year award
- 2018 Maine Academy of Nutritionists and Dietetics Public Policy Leadership award
- 2019 Maine Education Association “Friend of Education” award
- 2019 Maine Real Estate Development Association Public Policy award

== Electoral history ==
2012 Maine House District 73 Democratic primary
Party	Candidate	Votes	%
Democratic	Nathan Libby		100%
Total votes			100.0%

2012 Maine House Senate District 73 General Election
Party	Candidate	Votes	%
Democratic	Nathan Libby	2,225	64.5%
Republican	Larry Poulin	1,223	35.5%
Total votes		3,448	100.0%

2014 Maine State Senate District 21 Democratic primary
Party	Candidate	Votes	%
Democratic	Nathan Libby		100.0%
Total votes			100.0%

2014 Maine State Senate District 21 General Election
Party	Candidate	Votes	%
Democratic	Nathan Libby	6,646	50.3%
Republican	Patricia Gagne	6,563	49.7%%
Total votes		13,209	100.0%

2016 Maine State Senate District 21 Democratic primary
Party	Candidate	Votes	%
Democratic	Nathan Libby		100.0%
Total votes			100.0%

2016 Maine State Senate District 21 General Election
Party	Candidate	Votes	%
Democratic	Nathan Libby		100%
Total votes			100.0%

2018 Maine State Senate District 21 Democratic primary
Party	Candidate	Votes	%
Democratic	Nathan Libby	2,387	100.0%
Total votes		2,387	100.0%

2018 Maine State Senate District 21 General Election
Party	Candidate	Votes	%
Democratic	Nathan Libby	8,210	60.4%
Republican	Nelson Peters Jr.	5,378	39.6%
Total votes		13,588	100.0%

2020 Maine State Senate District 21 Democratic primary
Party	Candidate	Votes	%
Democratic	Nathan Libby	2,758	100.0%
Total votes		2,758	100.0%

2020 Maine State Senate District 21 General Election
Party	Candidate	Votes	%
Democratic	Nathan Libby	10,171	59.6%
Republican	Timothy Gallant	6,882	40.4%
Total votes		17,053	100.0%

Maine Senate
Preceded by Garrett Mason	Majority Leader of the Maine Senate; 2018–2021	Succeeded by Eloise Vitelli
