= Maine Senate =

Upper house of the Maine Legislature

Coordinates: 44°18′26″N 69°46′54″W

Maine State Senate
- Maine State Legislature

Type
- Type: Upper house
- Term limits: 4 terms (8 years) consecutive

History
- New session started: December 4, 2024

Leadership
- President: Mattie Daughtry (D) since December 4, 2024
- Majority Leader: Teresa Pierce (D) since December 4, 2024
- Minority Leader: Trey Stewart (R) since December 7, 2022

Structure
- Seats: 35
- Political groups: Majority: Democratic (20); Minority: Republican (14); Independents: Independent (1)
- Length of term: 2 years
- Authority: Article IV, Part Second, Maine Constitution
- Salary: Session 1: $13,526/year Session 2: $9,661/year + per diem

Elections
- Last election: November 5, 2024 (all 35 seats)
- Next election: November 3, 2026 (all 35 seats)
- Redistricting: Legislative control

Meeting place
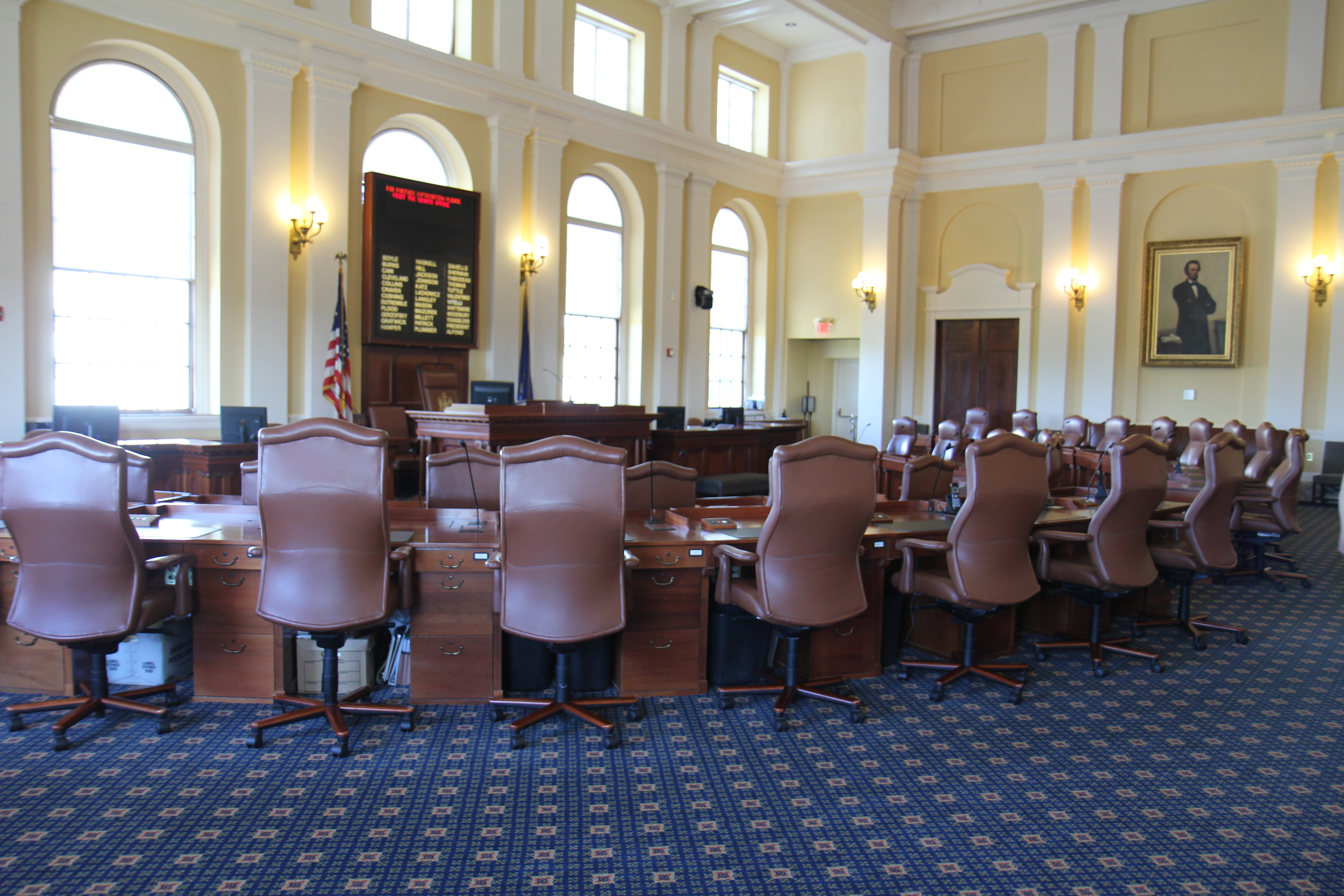
- State Senate Chamber; Maine State House; Augusta, Maine

Website
- Maine State Senate

The Maine Senate is the upper house of the Maine Legislature, the state legislature of the U.S. state of Maine. The Senate currently consists of 35 members representing an equal number of districts across the state, though the Maine Constitution allows for "an odd number of Senators, not less than 31 nor more than 35". Unlike the lower House, the Senate does not set aside nonvoting seats for Native tribes. Because it is a part-time position, members of the Maine Senate usually have outside employment as well.

The Senate meets at the Maine State House in Augusta. Members are limited to four consecutive terms with each term being two years but may run again after a two-year wait.

== Leadership ==
Unlike many U.S. states, the Senate's leader is not the lieutenant governor, as Maine does not have a lieutenant governor. Instead, the Senate chooses its own president, who is also the first in the line of gubernatorial succession.

== Composition of the 132nd (2024–2026) Maine Senate ==
Affiliation	Party (Shading indicates majority caucus)			Total	Vacant
Affiliation	Democratic	Republican	Independent	Total	Vacant
Begin 126th Legislature (Dec. 2012)	19	15	1	35	0
End 126th Legislature	19	15	1	35	0
Begin 127th Legislature (Dec. 2014) (Note: Includes a provisionally sworn-in Republican Sen.-elect who was subsequently revealed to have lost her election and replaced with the actual winner, a Democrat.)	14	21	0	35	0
End 127th Legislature	15	20	0	35	0
Begin 128th Legislature (Dec. 2016)	17	18	0	35	0
End 128th Legislature	17	18	0	35	0
Begin 129th Legislature (Dec. 2018)	21	14	0	35	0
End 129th Legislature	21	14	0	35	0
Begin 130th Legislature (Dec. 2020) (Note: Includes a Sen.-elect who declined to take the oath of office.)	22	13	0	35	0
End 130th Legislature	22	13	0	35	0
Begin 131st Legislature (Dec. 2022)	22	13	0	35	0
End 131st Legislature	22	12	0	34	1
Begin 132nd Legislature (Dec. 2024)	20	15	0	35	0
June 24, 2025 (Note: Rick Bennett (R-18) leaves the Republican Party to become an independent.)	20	14	1	35	0
Latest voting share	57.1%	40%	2.9%		

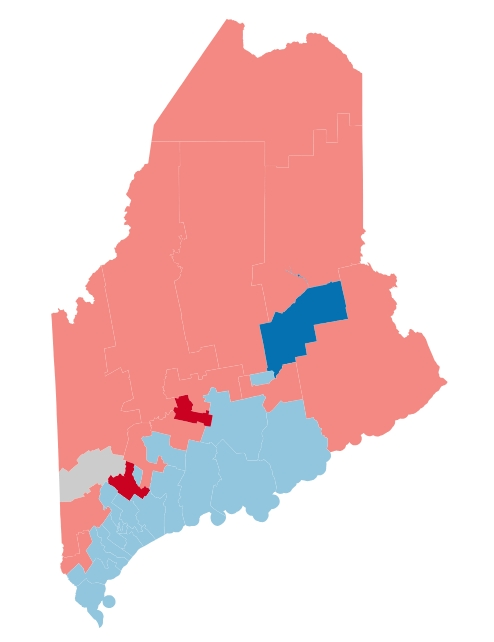
Makeup of Maine Senate (2025) Gray indicates independent. Blue indicates Democratic-held seat. Dark blue indicates a Democratic-held seat won by Donald Trump in 2024. Red indicates Republican-held seat. Dark Red indicates a Republican-held seat won by Kamala Harris in 2024.

=== Officers ===
Position	Name	Party
President of the Senate	Mattie Daughtry	Dem
Majority Leader	Teresa Pierce	Dem
Assistant Majority Leader	Jill Duson	Dem
Minority Leader	Trey Stewart	Rep
Assistant Minority Leader	Matthew Harrington	Rep
Secretary of the Senate	Darek Grant	Non-Partisan
Assistant Secretary of the Senate	Jared Roy	Non-Partisan

=== Members of the Maine Senate ===
Districts are currently numbered starting with 1 from north to south. While this is often reversed in the decennial redistricting, it was not reversed in the redistricting which occurred in 2021 and which went into effect beginning with the 2022 primary and general elections. The previous district lines, which were drawn in 2013 and were first used in the 2014 primary and general elections, were only in effect for 8 years rather than the usual 10 as Maine adjusted its legislative redistricting cycle to conform with most other states.

District	Name	Party	Mun. of residence	Cty. of residence	Start	Term limited
1	Susan Bernard	Rep	Caribou	Aroostook	2024	2032
2	Trey Stewart	Rep	Presque Isle	Aroostook	2020	2028
3	Brad Farrin	Rep	Norridgewock	Somerset	2018	2026
4	Stacey Guerin	Rep	Glenburn	Penobscot	2018	2026
5	Russell Black	Rep	Wilton	Franklin	2018	2026
6	Marianne Moore	Rep	Calais	Washington	2018	2026
7	Nicole Grohoski	Dem	Ellsworth	Hancock	2022 (Note: First won in a special election.)	2030
8	Mike Tipping	Dem	Orono	Penobscot	2022	2030
9	Joe Baldacci	Dem	Bangor	Penobscot	2020	2028
10	David Haggan	Rep	Hampden	Penobscot	2024	2032
11	Chip Curry	Dem	Belfast	Waldo	2020	2028
12	Pinny Beebe-Center	Dem	Rockland	Knox	2022	2030
13	Cameron Reny	Dem	Bristol	Lincoln	2022	2030
14	Craig Hickman	Dem	Winthrop	Kennebec	2021	2028
15	Richard Bradstreet	Rep	Vassalboro	Kennebec	2024	2032
16	Scott Cyrway (Note: Cyrway previously served in the state senate from 2014–2022.)	Rep	Albion	Kennebec	2024	2032
17	Jeff Timberlake	Rep	Turner	Androscoggin	2018	2026
18	Rick Bennett (Note: Bennett previously served in the state senate from 1996–2004.)	Ind (Note: Bennett served as a Republican until switching to Independent in 2025.)	Oxford	Oxford	2020	2028
19	Joseph Martin	Rep	Rumford	Oxford	2024	2032
20	Bruce Bickford	Rep	Auburn	Androscoggin	2024	2032
21	Peggy Rotundo	Dem	Lewiston	Androscoggin	2022	2030
22	James Libby (Note: Libby previously served in the state senate from 1996–2000.)	Rep	Standish	Cumberland	2022	2030
23	Mattie Daughtry	Dem	Brunswick	Cumberland	2020	2028
24	Denise Tepler	Dem	Topsham	Sagadahoc	2024	2032
25	Teresa Pierce	Dem	Falmouth	Cumberland	2022	2030
26	Tim Nangle	Dem	Windham	Cumberland	2022	2030
27	Jill Duson	Dem	Portland	Cumberland	2022	2030
28	Rachel Talbot Ross	Dem	Portland	Cumberland	2024	2032
29	Anne Carney	Dem	Cape Elizabeth	Cumberland	2020	2028
30	Stacy Brenner	Dem	Scarborough	Cumberland	2020	2028
31	Donna Bailey	Dem	Saco	York	2020	2028
32	Henry Ingwersen	Dem	Arundel	York	2022	2030
33	Matthew Harrington	Rep	Sanford	York	2022	2030
34	Joe Rafferty	Dem	Kennebunk	York	2020	2028
35	Mark Lawrence (Note: Lawrence previously served in the state senate from 1992–2000.)	Dem	Eliot	York	2018	2026

== Notable former members ==
- Augusta Kalloch Christie, first woman to serve in both houses of the Maine legislature, 1961-1964
