= 130th Maine Senate =

2021 to 2022 legislative session Senators

Maine State Senate
- 130th

Type
- Type: Upper house of the Maine Legislature
- Term limits: Four consecutive two-year terms

History
- Founded: December 2, 2020
- Disbanded: December 7, 2022
- Preceded by: 129th Maine Senate
- Succeeded by: 131st Maine Senate

Leadership
- President: Troy Jackson, Democratic Party (United States)
- Majority Leader: Eloise Vitelli, Democratic Party (United States)
- Assistant Majority Leader: Mattie Daughtry, Democratic Party (United States)

Structure
- Political groups: Democratic Party (United States); Republican Party (United States)
- Joint committees: Agriculture, Conservation and Forestry; *Appropriations and Financial Affairs; Criminal Justice and Public Safety; Education and Cultural Affairs; Energy, Utilities and Technology; Environment and Natural Resources; Health and Human Services; Health Coverage, Insurance and Financial Services; Inland Fisheries and Wildlife; Innovation, Development, Economic Advancement and Business; Judiciary; Labor and Housing; Marine Resources; State and Local Government; Taxation; Transportation; Veterans and Legal Affairs
- Length of term: Two years

Elections
- Redistricting: 2022

Meeting place
- Maine State House, Augusta

Constitution
- Constitution of Maine

The 130th Maine Senate, convened on 2 December 2020 and adjourned sine die on 9 May 2022, had 35 members elected to two-year terms in the 2020 Maine State Senate election. The 130th Senate had 22 Democrats and 13 Republicans. It held four sessions: Two Regular Sessions and two Special Sessions. The First Regular Session convened on December 2, 2020 and adjourned on 30 March 2021. The First Special Session adjourned on 19 July 2021, and the Second Special Session adjourned on 29 September 2021. The Second Regular Session adjourned on 9 May 2022.

== Leadership ==
Position	Name	Party	Residence	County
President	Troy Jackson	Democratic	Allagash	Aroostook
Majority Leader	Nate Libby	Democratic	Lewiston	Androscoggin
Assistant Majority Leader	Eloise Vitelli	Democratic	Topsham	Sagadahoc
Minority Leader	Jeff Timberlake	Republican	Turner	Androscoggin
Assistant Minority Leader	Matthew Pouliot	Republican	Augusta	Kennebec

== Senators ==
District	Senator	Party	Municipality	County
1	Troy Jackson	Democratic	Allagash	Aroostook
2	Trey Stewart	Republican	Presque Isle	Aroostook
3	Brad Farrin	Republican	Norridgewock	Somerset
4	Paul Davis	Republican	Sangerville	Piscataquis
5	Jim Dill	Democratic	Old Town	Penobscot
6	Marianne Moore	Republican	Calais	Washington
7	Louis Luchini (Note: Luchini resigned on January 18th to take a position with the United States Small Business Administration. A special election was held on June 14, 2022 to fill the seat.); Nicole Grohoski	Democratic	Ellsworth (both)	Hancock
8	Kimberley Rosen	Republican	Bucksport	Hancock
9	Joe Baldacci	Democratic	Bangor	Penobscot
10	Stacey Guerin	Republican	Glenburn	Penobscot
11	Chip Curry	Democratic	Belfast	Waldo
12	David Miramant	Democratic	Camden	Knox
13	Chloe Maxmin	Democratic	Nobleboro	Lincoln
14	Shenna Bellows (Note: Bellows was elected Maine Secretary of State in December 2021 and resigned her Senate seat to take the position. A special election was held in March 2022 to fill the seat.); Craig Hickman	Democratic	Bellows: Manchester; Hickman: Winthrop	Kennebec
15	Matthew Pouliot	Republican	Augusta	Kennebec
16	Scott Cyrway	Republican	Benton	Kennebec
17	Russell Black	Republican	Wilton	Franklin
18	Lisa Keim	Republican	Dixfield	Oxford
19	Rick Bennett	Republican	Oxford	Oxford
20	Ned Claxton	Democratic	Auburn	Androscoggin
21	Nate Libby	Democratic	Lewiston	Androscoggin
22	Jeff Timberlake	Republican	Turner	Androscoggin
23	Eloise Vitelli	Democratic	Topsham	Sagadahoc
24	Mattie Daughtry	Democratic	Brunswick	Cumberland
25	Cathy Breen	Democratic	Falmouth	Cumberland
26	William Diamond	Democratic	Windham	Cumberland
27	Ben Chipman	Democratic	Portland	Cumberland
28	Heather Sanborn	Democratic	Portland	Cumberland
29	Anne Carney	Democratic	Cape Elizabeth	Cumberland
30	Stacy Brenner	Democratic	Scarborough	Cumberland
31	Donna Bailey	Democratic	Saco	York
32	Susan Deschambault	Democratic	Biddeford	York
33	David Woodsome	Republican	Waterboro	York
34	Joe Rafferty	Democratic	Kennebunk	York
35	Mark Lawrence	Democratic	South Berwick	York

== See also ==
- List of Maine State Senators
- List of Maine state legislatures
