= 129th Maine Senate =

American state legislative body, 2018-2020

The 129th Maine Senate had 35 members each elected to two-year terms in November 2018. The first regular session was sworn in on December 5, 2018.

The 129th Senate party composition was:

- 21 Democrats
- 14 Republicans

== Leadership ==
Position	Name	Party	Residence	County
President	Troy Jackson	Democratic	Allagash	Aroostook
Majority Leader	Nate Libby	Democratic	Lewiston	Androscoggin
Assistant Majority Leader	Eloise Vitelli	Democratic	Topsham	Sagadahoc
Minority Leader	Dana Dow	Republican	Waterboro	Lincoln
Assistant Minority Leader	Jeff Timberlake	Republican	Turner	Androscoggin

== Senators ==
District	Senator	Party	Municipality	County
1	Troy Jackson	Democratic	Allagash	Aroostook
2	Michael E. Carpenter	Democratic	Houlton	Aroostook
3	Brad Farrin	Republican	Norridgewock	Somerset
4	Paul Davis	Republican	Sangerville	Piscataquis
5	Jim Dill	Democratic	Old Town	Penobscot
6	Marianne Moore	Republican	Calais	Washington
7	Louis Luchini	Democratic	Ellsworth	Hancock
8	Kimberley Rosen	Republican	Bucksport	Hancock
9	Geoffrey Gratwick	Democratic	Bangor	Penobscot
10	Stacey Guerin	Republican	Glenburn	Penobscot
11	Erin Herbig	Democratic	Winterport	Waldo
12	David Miramant	Democratic	Camden	Knox
13	Dana Dow	Republican	Waterboro	Lincoln
14	Shenna Bellows	Democratic	Manchester	Kennebec
15	Matthew Pouliot	Republican	Augusta	Kennebec
16	Scott Cyrway	Republican	Benton	Kennebec
17	Russell Black	Republican	Wilton	Franklin
18	Lisa Keim	Republican	Dixfield	Oxford
19	James Hamper	Republican	Oxford	Oxford
20	Ned Claxton	Democratic	Auburn	Androscoggin
21	Nate Libby	Democratic	Lewiston	Androscoggin
22	Jeff Timberlake	Republican	Turner	Androscoggin
23	Eloise Vitelli	Democratic	Topsham	Sagadahoc
24	Brownie Carson	Democratic	Brunswick	Cumberland
25	Cathy Breen	Democratic	Falmouth	Cumberland
26	William Diamond	Democratic	Windham	Cumberland
27	Ben Chipman	Democratic	Portland	Cumberland
28	Heather Sanborn	Democratic	Portland	Cumberland
29	Rebecca Millett	Democratic	Cape Elizbath	Cumberland
30	Linda Sanborn	Democratic	Gorham	Cumberland
31	Justin Chenette	Democratic	Saco	York
32	Susan Deschambault	Democratic	Biddeford	York
33	David Woodsome	Republican	Waterboro	York
34	Robert Foley	Republican	Wells	York
35	Mark Lawrence	Democratic	South Berwick	York

== See also ==
- List of Maine State Senators
- List of Maine state legislatures
