= 2022 Maine Senate election =

- November 8, 2022

All 35 seats in the Maine Senate 18 seats needed for a majority
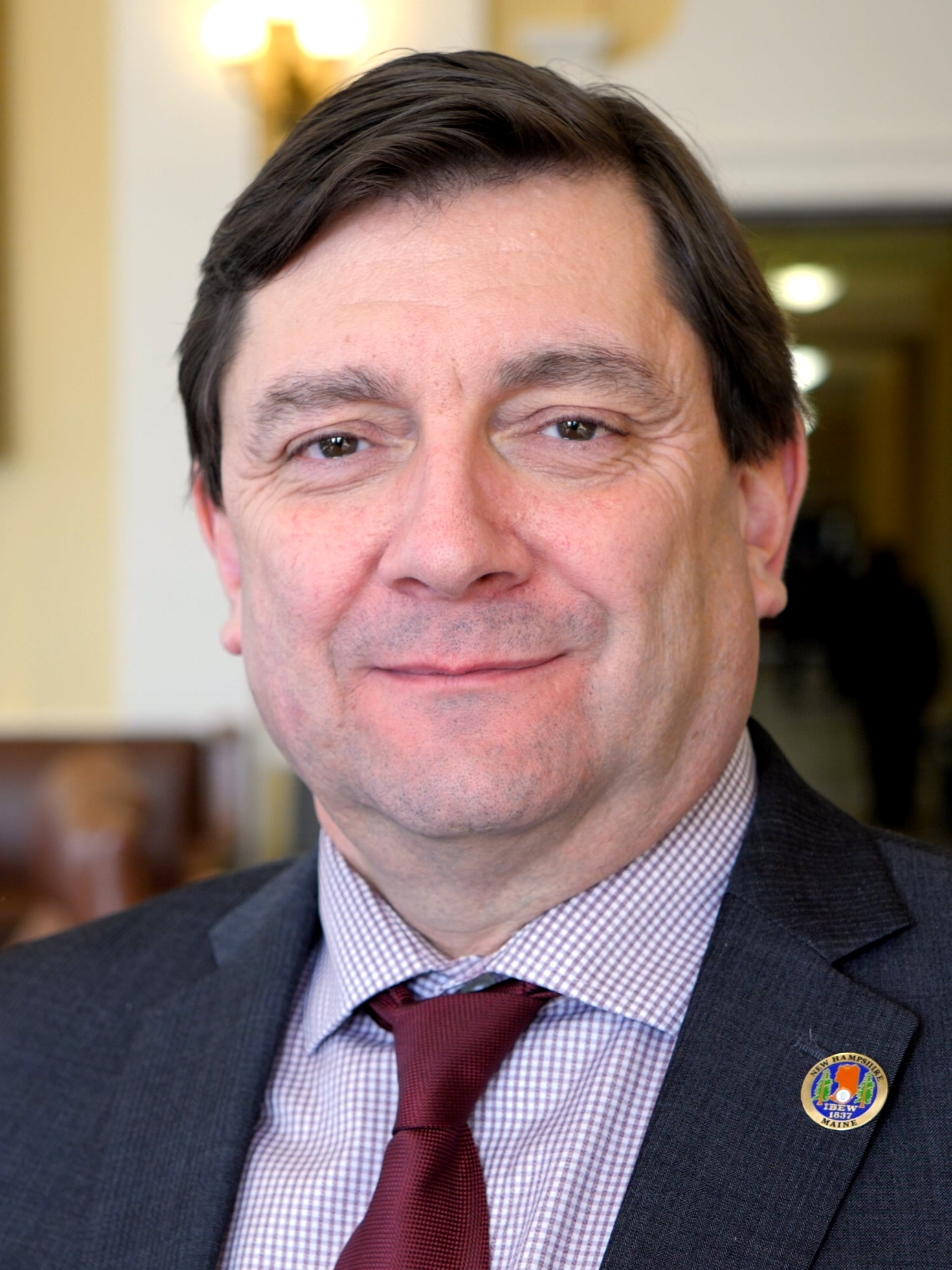

	Majority party	Minority party
Leader	Troy Jackson	Trey Stewart
Party	Democratic	Republican
Leader since	December 7, 2016	November 10, 2022
Leader's seat	1st – Allagash	2nd – Presque Isle
Seats before	22	13
Seats after	22	13
Seat change	Steady	Steady
Popular vote	351,606	313,379
Percentage	52.7%	47.0%
Swing	▼0.2%	▲0.3%
- Democratic hold Democratic gain Republican hold Republican gain 50–60% 60–70% 70–80% 80–90% 50–60% 60–70% 70–80%
Senate President before election
Troy Jackson
Democratic
Elected Senate President
Troy Jackson
Democratic

The 2022 Maine State Senate election was held on Tuesday, November 8, 2022, with the primary election using instant-runoff voting being held on June 14, 2022, to elect the 131st Maine Senate. Voters in all 35 districts of the Maine Senate elected their state senators. These elections coincided with those for governor, U.S. House and the Maine House of Representatives. Democrats retained their 23–12 advantage in the chamber.

== Retiring incumbents ==
=== Democrats ===
District 5: Jim Dill retired due to term limits.
District 12: David Miramant retired due to term limits.
District 13: Chloe Maxmin retired.
District 20: Ned Claxton retired.
District 21: Nate Libby retired due to term limits.
District 25: Cathy Breen retired due to term limits.
District 26: William Diamond retired due to term limits.
District 28: Heather Sanborn retired.
District 32: Susan Deschambault retired due to term limits.

=== Republicans ===
District 4: Paul Davis retired due to term limits.
District 8: Kimberley Rosen retired due to term limits.
District 16: Scott Cyrway retired due to term limits.
District 33: David Woodsome retired due to term limits.

== Predictions ==
Source	Ranking	As of
Sabato's Crystal Ball	Tossup	May 19, 2022

== Results ==
Results
Parties	Candidates	Popular vote		Seats			
Parties	Candidates	Vote	%	2020	2022	+/−	%
Democratic	35	351,606	52.69%	22	22	Steady	62.86%
Republican	35	313,379	46.96%	13	13	Steady	37.14%
Independent	1	2,373	0.36%	0	0	Steady	0.00%
Total	71	667,358	100.00%	35	35		100.00%

=== Closest races ===
Seats where the margin of victory was under 10%:

1. District 20, 0.80%, Republican gain
2. District 26, 1.80%
3. District 16, 2.00%, Democratic gain
4. District 14, 4.80%
5. District 1, 5.02%
6. District 8, 5.70%
7. District 33, 8.14%
8. District 13, 9.40%

== Results ==
Italics denote an open seat held by the incumbent party; bold text denotes a gain for a party.
† - Incumbent not seeking re-election

Senate district	Incumbent	Party	Elected senator	Party
1st	Troy Jackson	Dem	Troy Jackson	Dem
2nd	Trey Stewart	Rep	Trey Stewart	Rep
3rd	Brad Farrin	Rep	Brad Farrin	Rep
3rd	Scott Cyrway† (Note: Redistricted from the 16th district.)	Rep	Brad Farrin	Rep
4th	Paul Davis†	Rep	Stacey Guerin	Rep
4th	Stacey Guerin (Note: Redistricted from the 5th district.)	Rep	Stacey Guerin	Rep
5th	Russell Black (Note: Redistricted from the 17th district.)	Rep	Russell Black	Rep
6th	Marianne Moore	Rep	Marianne Moore	Rep
7th	Nicole Grohoski	Dem	Nicole Grohoski	Dem
8th	Jim Dill† (Note: Redistricted from the 5th district.)	Dem	Mike Tipping	Dem
9th	Joe Baldacci	Dem	Joe Baldacci	Dem
10th	Kimberley Rosen† (Note: Redistricted from the 8th district.)	Rep	Peter Lyford	Rep
11th	Chip Curry	Dem	Chip Curry	Dem
12th	David Miramant†	Dem	Pinny Beebe-Center	Dem
13th	Chloe Maxmin†	Dem	Cameron Reny	Dem
14th	Craig Hickman	Dem	Craig Hickman	Dem
15th	Matthew Pouliot	Rep	Matthew Pouliot	Rep
16th	new seat		**David LaFountain**	Dem
17th	Jeff Timberlake (Note: Redistricted from the 22nd district.)	Rep	Jeff Timberlake	Rep
18th	Rick Bennett (Note: Redistricted from the 19th district.)	Rep	Rick Bennett	Rep
19th	Lisa Keim (Note: Redistricted from the 18nd district.)	Rep	Lisa Keim	Rep
20th	Ned Claxton†	Dem	**Eric Brakey**	Rep
21st	Nate Libby†	Dem	Peggy Rotundo	Dem
22nd	new seat		**James Libby**	Rep
23rd	Mattie Daughtry (Note: Redistricted from the 24rd district.)	Dem	Mattie Daughtry	Dem
24th	Eloise Vitelli (Note: Redistricted from the 23rd district.)	Dem	Eloise Vitelli	Dem
25th	Catherine Breen†	Dem	Teresa Pierce	Dem
26th	William Diamond†	Dem	Tim Nangle	Dem
27th	Heather Sanborn† (Note: Redistricted from the 28th district.)	Dem	Jill Duson	Dem
28th	Ben Chipman (Note: Redistricted from the 27th district.)	Dem	Ben Chipman	Dem
29th	Anne Carney	Dem	Anne Carney	Dem
30th	Stacy Brenner	Dem	Stacy Brenner	Dem
31st	Donna Bailey	Dem	Donna Bailey	Dem
32nd	Susan Deschambault†	Dem	Henry Ingwersen	Dem
33rd	David Woodsome†	Rep	Matthew Harrington	Rep
34th	Joe Rafferty	Dem	Joe Rafferty	Dem
35th	Mark Lawrence	Dem	Mark Lawrence	Dem

== Detailed results ==
=== District 1 ===
The 1st district, in Aroostook County, consisted of Caribou, Fort Fairfield, Fort Kent, Madawaska, Mapleton, 29 other municipalities, and several townships. Incumbent Democrat Troy Jackson had represented the 1st district since 2016, and was re-elected.

==== Primary elections ====
Maine State Senate 1st District Democratic Party primary election, 2022
Party	Candidate	Votes	%
Democratic	Troy Jackson, of Allagash (incumbent)	1,268	100.00
Total votes		1,268	100.00

Maine State Senate 1st District Republican Party primary election, 2022
Party	Candidate	Votes	%
Republican	Susan Bernard, of Caribou	1,687	100.00
Total votes		1,687	100.00

==== General election ====
Maine State Senate 1st District general election, 2022
Party	Candidate	Votes	%
Democratic	Troy Jackson, of Allagash (incumbent)	8,817	52.51
Republican	Susan Bernard, of Caribou	7,974	47.49
Total votes		16,791	100.00
Democratic hold			

=== District 2 ===
The 2nd district, in Aroostook and Penobscot counties, consisted of East Millinocket, Hodgdon, Houlton, Millinocket, Presque Isle, 37 other municipalities, and several townships. Incumbent Republican Trey Stewart had represented the 2nd district since 2020, and was re-elected.

==== Primary elections ====
Maine State Senate 2nd District Democratic Party primary election, 2022
Party	Candidate	Votes	%
Democratic	Laura Farnsworth, (Note: Withdrew on June 21, 2022, and was replaced by the state party with Danielle Fienberg on July 25, 2022.) of Island Falls	656	100.00
Total votes		656	100.00

Maine State Senate 2nd District Republican Party primary election, 2022
Party	Candidate	Votes	%
Republican	Trey Stewart, of Presque Isle (incumbent)	1,899	100.00
Total votes		1,899	100.00

==== General election ====
Maine State Senate 2nd District general election, 2022
Party	Candidate	Votes	%
Republican	Trey Stewart, of Presque Isle (incumbent)	11,681	70.04
Democratic	Danielle Fienberg, of Presque Isle	4,997	29.96
Total votes		16,678	100.00
Republican hold			

=== District 3 ===
The 3rd district, in Kennebec, Penobscot, and Somerset counties, consisted of Clinton, Madison, Norridgewock, Pittsfield, Skowhegan, 9 other municipalities, and one township. Incumbent Republican Brad Farrin had represented the 3rd district since 2018, and was re-elected. The district also included the home of incumbent Republican Scott Cyrway, who had represented the 16th district since 2014, and was term-limited.

==== Primary elections ====
Maine State Senate 3rd District Democratic Party primary election, 2022
Party	Candidate	Votes	%
Democratic	Shawn Bean, of Madison	938	100.00
Total votes		938	100.00

Maine State Senate 3rd District Republican Party primary election, 2022
Party	Candidate	Votes	%
Republican	Brad Farrin, of Norridgewock (incumbent)	2,093	100.00
Total votes		2,093	100.00

==== General election ====
Maine State Senate 3rd District general election, 2022
Party	Candidate	Votes	%
Republican	Brad Farrin, of Norridgewock (incumbent)	11,220	65.39
Democratic	Shawn Bean, of Madison	5,913	34.46
	scattering	25	0.15
Total votes		17,158	100.00
Republican hold			

=== District 4 ===
The 4th district, in Penobscot and Piscataquis counties, consisted of Corinth, Dexter, Dover-Foxcroft, Glenburn, Levant, 24 other municipalities, and several townships. Incumbent Republican Paul Davis had represented the 4th district since 2014, was term-limited. The new 4th district also included the home of incumbent Republican Stacey Guerin, who had represented the 10th district since 2018. She was re-elected.

==== Primary elections ====
Maine State Senate 4th District Democratic Party primary election, 2022
Party	Candidate	Votes	%
Democratic	Andrea Thurlow, of Atkinson Township	835	100.00
Total votes		835	100.00

Maine State Senate 4th District Republican Party primary election, 2022
Party	Candidate	Votes	%
Republican	Stacey Guerin, of Glenburn (incumbent)	2,627	100.00
Total votes		2,627	100.00

==== General election ====
Maine State Senate 4th District general election, 2022
Party	Candidate	Votes	%
Republican	Stacey Guerin, of Glenburn (incumbent)	13,321	70.11
Democratic	Andrea Thurlow, of Atkinson Township	5,679	29.89
Total votes		19,000	100.00
Republican hold			

=== District 5 ===
The 5th district, in Franklin, Kennebec, and Somerset counties, consisted of Anson, Farmington, New Sharon, St. Albans, Wilton, 31 other municipalities, and several townships. The new 5th district included the home of incumbent Republican Russell Black, who had represented the 17th district since 2018. He was re-elected.

==== Primary elections ====
Maine State Senate 5th District Democratic Party primary election, 2022
Party	Candidate	Votes	%
Democratic	Stanley Wheeler, of Farmington	1,110	100.00
Total votes		1,110	100.00

Maine State Senate 5th District Republican Party primary election, 2022
Party	Candidate	Votes	%
Republican	Russell Black, of Wilton (incumbent)	2,310	100.00
Total votes		2,310	100.00

==== General election ====
Maine State Senate 5th District general election, 2022
Party	Candidate	Votes	%
Republican	Russell Black, of Wilton (incumbent)	10,737	54.98
Democratic	Stanley Wheeler, of Farmington	6,420	32.87
Real Maine Independent	Douglas Thomas, of Ripley	2,373	12.15
Total votes		19,530	100.00
Republican hold			

=== District 6 ===
The 6th district, in Hancock and Washington counties, consisted of Calais, Franklin, Gouldsboro, Hancock, Machias, 51 other municipalities, and several townships. Incumbent Republican Marianne Moore had represented the 6th district since 2018, and was re-elected.

==== Primary elections ====
Maine State Senate 6th District Democratic Party primary election, 2022
Party	Candidate	Votes	%
Democratic	Jonathan Goble, of Cherryfield	1,314	100.00
Total votes		1,314	100.00

Maine State Senate 6th District Republican Party primary election, 2022
Party	Candidate	Votes	%
Republican	Marianne Moore, of Calais (incumbent)	2,700	100.00
Total votes		2,700	100.00

==== General election ====
Maine State Senate 6th District general election, 2022
Party	Candidate	Votes	%
Republican	Marianne Moore, of Calais (incumbent)	12,980	66.85
Democratic	Jonathan Goble, of Cherryfield	6,436	33.15
Total votes		19,416	100.00
Republican hold			

=== District 7 ===
The 7th district, in Hancock and Knox counties, consisted of Bar Harbor, Blue Hill, Ellsworth, Mount Desert, Orland, and 17 other municipalities. Incumbent Democrat Louis Luchini represented the 7th district from 2018 until he resigned on January 18, 2022. Democrat Nicole Grohoski was elected in a special election coinciding with the primary election, and she was re-elected.

==== Primary elections ====
Maine State Senate 7th District Democratic Party primary election, 2022
Party	Candidate	Votes	%
Democratic	Nicole Grohoski, of Ellsworth	5,157	100.00
Total votes		5,157	100.00

Maine State Senate 7th District Republican Party primary election, 2022
Party	Candidate	Votes	%
Republican	Brian Langley, of Ellsworth	2,446	100.00
Total votes		2,446	100.00

==== General election ====
Maine State Senate 7th District general election, 2022
Party	Candidate	Votes	%
Democratic	Nicole Grohoski, of Ellsworth (incumbent)	12,811	58.97
Republican	Brian Langley, of Ellsworth	8,913	41.03
Total votes		21,724	100.00
Democratic hold			

=== District 8 ===
The 8th district, in Penobscot County, consisted of Lincoln, Milford, Old Town, Orono, Veazie, 15 other municipalities, and several townships. The new 8th district included the home of incumbent Democrat Jim Dill, who had represented the 5th district since 2014. He was term-limited, and Democrat Mike Tipping was elected.

==== Primary elections ====
Maine State Senate 8th District Democratic Party primary election, 2022
Party	Candidate	Votes	%
Democratic	Mike Tipping, of Orono	1,354	62.08
Democratic	Abe Furth, of Old Town	827	37.92
Total votes		2,181	100.00

Maine State Senate 8th District Republican Party primary election, 2022
Party	Candidate	Votes	%
Republican	Eric Rojo, of Lincoln	789	54.26
Republican	Grace Ann Tibbetts, of Lincoln	665	45.74
Total votes		1,454	100.00

==== General election ====
Maine State Senate 8th District general election, 2022
Party	Candidate	Votes	%
Democratic	Mike Tipping, of Orono	8,317	52.85
Republican	Eric Rojo, of Lincoln	7,421	47.15
Total votes		15,738	100.00
Democratic hold			

=== District 9 ===
The 9th district, in Penobscot County, consisted of Bangor and Hermon. Incumbent Democrat Joe Baldacci had represented the 9th district since 2020, and was re-elected.

==== Primary elections ====
Maine State Senate 9th District Democratic Party primary election, 2022
Party	Candidate	Votes	%
Democratic	Joe Baldacci, of Bangor (incumbent)	1,524	100.00
Total votes		1,524	100.00

Maine State Senate 9th District Republican Party primary election, 2022
Party	Candidate	Votes	%
Republican	James Plowman, (Note: Withdrew on June 21, 2022, and was replaced by the state party with Suzette Furrow on July 22, 2022.) of Hermon	1,302	100.00
Total votes		1,302	100.00

==== General election ====
Maine State Senate 9th District general election, 2022
Party	Candidate	Votes	%
Democratic	Joe Baldacci, of Bangor (incumbent)	9,055	59.15
Republican	Suzette Furrow, of Bangor	6,253	40.85
Total votes		15,308	100.00
Democratic hold			

=== District 10 ===
The 10th district, in Hancock and Penobscot counties, consisted of Brewer, Bucksport, Hampden, Holden, Orrington, and 7 other municipalities. The new 10th district included the home of incumbent Republican Kimberley Rosen, who had represented the 8th district since 2014. She was term-limited, and Republican Peter Lyford was elected.

==== Primary elections ====
Maine State Senate 10th District Democratic Party primary election, 2022
Party	Candidate	Votes	%
Democratic	Ralph Cammack, of Brewer	1,040	100.00
Total votes		1,040	100.00

Maine State Senate 10th District Republican Party primary election, 2022
Party	Candidate	Votes	%
Republican	Peter Lyford, of Eddington	1,438	54.61
Republican	Robert Cross, of Dedham	1,195	45.39
Total votes		2,633	100.00

==== General election ====
Maine State Senate 10th District general election, 2022
Party	Candidate	Votes	%
Republican	Peter Lyford, of Eddington	11,522	56.11
Democratic	Ralph Cammack, of Brewer	9,011	43.89
Total votes		20,533	100.00
Republican hold			

=== District 11 ===
The 11th district, in Waldo County, consisted of Belfast, Lincolnville, Northport, Searsport, Winterport, and 21 other municipalities. Incumbent Democrat Chip Curry had represented the 11th district since 2020, and was re-elected.

==== Primary elections ====
Maine State Senate 11th District Democratic Party primary election, 2022
Party	Candidate	Votes	%
Democratic	Chip Curry, of Belfast (incumbent)	1,818	100.00
Total votes		1,818	100.00

Maine State Senate 11th District Republican Party primary election, 2022
Party	Candidate	Votes	%
Republican	MaryAnne Kinney, of Knox	2,127	100.00
Total votes		2,127	100.00

==== General election ====
Maine State Senate 11th District general election, 2022
Party	Candidate	Votes	%
Democratic	Chip Curry, of Belfast (incumbent)	11,543	55.35
Republican	MaryAnne Kinney, of Knox	9,312	44.65
Total votes		20,855	100.00
Democratic hold			

=== District 12 ===
The 12th district, in Knox County, consisted of Camden, Rockland, Rockport, St. George, Warren, and 11 other municipalities. Incumbent Democrat David Miramant had represented the 12th district since 2014, and was term-limited. Democrat Pinny Beebe-Center was elected.

==== Primary elections ====
Maine State Senate 12th District Democratic Party primary election, 2022
Party	Candidate	Votes	%
Democratic	Pinny Beebe-Center, of Rockland	2,889	100.00
Total votes		2,889	100.00

Maine State Senate 12th District Republican Party primary election, 2022
Party	Candidate	Votes	%
Republican	Scott Rocknak, of Camden	1,652	100.00
Total votes		1,652	100.00

==== General election ====
Maine State Senate 12th District general election, 2022
Party	Candidate	Votes	%
Democratic	Pinny Beebe-Center, of Rockland	12,525	59.30
Republican	Scott Rocknak, of Camden	8,597	40.70
Total votes		21,122	100.00
Democratic hold			

=== District 13 ===
The 13th district, in Kennebec, Knox, and Lincoln counties, consisted of Boothbay, Bristol, Jefferson, Waldoboro, Wiscasset, and 15 other municipalities. Incumbent Democrat Chloe Maxmin had represented the 13th district since 2020, and retired. Democrat Cameron Reny was elected.

==== Primary elections ====
Maine State Senate 13th District Democratic Party primary election, 2022
Party	Candidate	Votes	%
Democratic	Cameron Reny, of Bristol	2,165	66.84
Democratic	David Levesque, of Newcastle	1,074	33.16
Total votes		3,239	100.00

Maine State Senate 13th District Republican Party primary election, 2022
Party	Candidate	Votes	%
Republican	Abden Simmons, of Waldoboro	1,998	100.00
Total votes		1,998	100.00

==== General election ====
Maine State Senate 13th District general election, 2022
Party	Candidate	Votes	%
Democratic	Cameron Reny, of Bristol	11,970	54.70
Republican	Abden Simmons, of Waldoboro	9,913	45.30
Total votes		21,883	100.00
Democratic hold			

=== District 14 ===
The 14th district, in Kennebec County, consisted of Gardiner, Hallowell, Monmouth, West Gardiner, Winthrop, and 7 other municipalities. Incumbent Democrat Craig Hickman had represented the 14th district since 2021, and was re-elected.

==== Primary elections ====
Maine State Senate 14th District Democratic Party primary election, 2022
Party	Candidate	Votes	%
Democratic	Craig Hickman, of Winthrop (incumbent)	2,459	100.00
Total votes		2,459	100.00

Maine State Senate 14th District Republican Party primary election, 2022
Party	Candidate	Votes	%
Republican	Jeffery Hanley, of Pittston	1,986	100.00
Total votes		1,986	100.00

==== General election ====
Maine State Senate 14th District general election, 2022
Party	Candidate	Votes	%
Democratic	Craig Hickman, of Winthrop (incumbent)	10,940	52.40
Republican	Jeffery Hanley, of Pittston	9,936	47.60
Total votes		20,876	100.00
Democratic hold			

=== District 15 ===
The 15th district, in Kennebec County, consisted of Augusta, Belgrade, China, Mount Vernon, Sidney, and Vassalboro. Incumbent Republican Matthew Pouliot had represented the 15th district since 2018, and was re-elected.

==== Primary elections ====
Maine State Senate 15th District Democratic Party primary election, 2022
Party	Candidate	Votes	%
Democratic	Storme St. Valle, of Augusta	1,181	100.00
Total votes		1,181	100.00

Maine State Senate 15th District Republican Party primary election, 2022
Party	Candidate	Votes	%
Republican	Matthew Pouliot, of Augusta (incumbent)	1,845	100.00
Total votes		1,845	100.00

==== General election ====
Maine State Senate 15th District general election, 2022
Party	Candidate	Votes	%
Republican	Matthew Pouliot, of Augusta (incumbent)	10,241	57.75
Democratic	Storme St. Valle, of Augusta	7,491	42.25
Total votes		17,732	100.00
Republican hold			

=== District 16 ===
The 16th district, in Kennebec and Somerset counties, consisted of Albion, Fairfield, Oakland, Waterville, and Winslow. The new 16th district was home to no incumbent senators. Democrat David LaFountain was elected over Republican Mike Perkins, whose primary was decided via instant-runoff voting.

==== Primary elections ====
Maine State Senate 16th District Democratic Party primary election, 2022
Party	Candidate	Votes	%
Democratic	David LaFountain, of Winslow	894	100.00
Total votes		894	100.00

Maine State Senate 16th District Republican Party primary election, 2022
Party	Candidate	First choice			Round 1	
Party	Candidate	Votes	%	Transfer	Votes	%
Republican	Mike Perkins, of Oakland	846	44.20%	+76	922	52.18%
Republican	Kevin Kitchin, of Fairfield	733	38.30%	+112	845	47.82%
Republican	Mark Andre, of Oakland	335	17.50%	-335	Eliminated	
Total votes		1914	100.00%	-147	1767	100.00%

==== General election ====
Maine State Senate 16th District general election, 2022
Party	Candidate	Votes	%
Democratic	David LaFountain, of Winslow	8,349	51.00
Republican	Mike Perkins, of Oakland	8,022	49.00
Total votes		16,371	100.00
Democratic win (new seat)			

=== District 17 ===
The 17th district, in Androscoggin and Kennebec counties, consisted of Greene, Lisbon, Litchfield, Sabattus, Turner, and 5 other municipalities. The new 17th district included the home of incumbent Republican Jeff Timberlake, who had represented the 22nd district since 2018. He was re-elected.

==== Primary elections ====
Maine State Senate 17th District Democratic Party primary election, 2022
Party	Candidate	Votes	%
Democratic	Jo-Jean Keller, of Lisbon	964	100.00
Total votes		964	100.00

Maine State Senate 17th District Republican Party primary election, 2022
Party	Candidate	Votes	%
Republican	Jeff Timberlake, of Turner (incumbent)	2,143	100.00
Total votes		2,143	100.00

==== General election ====
Maine State Senate 17th District general election, 2022
Party	Candidate	Votes	%
Republican	Jeff Timberlake, of Turner (incumbent)	11,989	65.84
Democratic	Jo-Jean Keller, of Lisbon	6,220	34.16
Total votes		18,209	100.00
Republican hold			

=== District 18 ===
The 18th district, in Androscoggin, Cumberland, and Oxford counties, consisted of Bridgton, Fryeburg, Norway, Oxford, Paris, and 9 other municipalities. The new 18th district included the home of incumbent Republican Rick Bennett, who had represented the 19th district since 2020. He was re-elected.

==== Primary elections ====
Maine State Senate 18th District Democratic Party primary election, 2022
Party	Candidate	Votes	%
Democratic	Colin O'Neill, of Oxford	1,317	100.00
Total votes		1,317	100.00

Maine State Senate 18th District Republican Party primary election, 2022
Party	Candidate	Votes	%
Republican	Rick Bennett, of Oxford (incumbent)	2,284	100.00
Total votes		2,284	100.00

==== General election ====
Maine State Senate 18th District general election, 2022
Party	Candidate	Votes	%
Republican	Rick Bennett, of Oxford (incumbent)	11,931	62.46
Democratic	Colin O'Neill, of Oxford	7,171	37.54
Total votes		19,102	100.00
Republican hold			

=== District 19 ===
The 19th district, in Franklin and Oxford counties, consisted of Bethel, Dixfield, Jay, Mexico, Rumford, 30 other municipalities, and several townships. The new 19th district included the home of incumbent Republican Lisa Keim, who had represented the 18th district since 2016. She was re-elected.

==== Primary elections ====
Maine State Senate 19th District Democratic Party primary election, 2022
Party	Candidate	Votes	%
Democratic	Timothy Carter, (Note: Withdrew on July 11, 2022, and was replaced by the state party with Matthew Bean on July 22, 2022.) of Bethel	1,337	100.00
Total votes		1,337	100.00

Maine State Senate 19th District Republican Party primary election, 2022
Party	Candidate	Votes	%
Republican	Lisa Keim, of Dixfield (incumbent)	2,332	100.00
Total votes		2,332	100.00

==== General election ====
Maine State Senate 19th District general election, 2022
Party	Candidate	Votes	%
Republican	Lisa Keim, of Dixfield (incumbent)	11,902	62.60
Democratic	Matthew Bean, of Andover	7,111	37.40
Total votes		19,013	100.00
Republican hold			

=== District 20 ===
The 20th district, in Androscoggin and Cumberland counties, consisted of Auburn, Durham, New Gloucester, and Poland. Incumbent Democrat Ned Claxton had represented the 20th district since 2018, and retired. Republican Eric Brakey was elected.

==== Primary elections ====
Maine State Senate 20th District Democratic Party primary election, 2022
Party	Candidate	Votes	%
Democratic	Bettyann Sheats, of Auburn	1,345	100.00
Total votes		1,345	100.00

Maine State Senate 20th District Republican Party primary election, 2022
Party	Candidate	Votes	%
Republican	Eric Brakey, of Auburn	1,494	100.00
Total votes		1,494	100.00

==== General election ====
Maine State Senate 20th District general election, 2022
Party	Candidate	Votes	%
Republican	Eric Brakey, of Auburn	9,064	50.41
Democratic	Bettyann Sheats, of Auburn	8,918	49.59
Total votes		17,982	100.00
Republican gain from Democratic			

=== District 21 ===
The 21st district, in Androscoggin County, consisted of Lewiston. Incumbent Democrat Nate Libby had represented the 21st district since 2014, and was term-limited. Democrat Peggy Rotundo was elected.

==== Primary elections ====
Maine State Senate 21st District Democratic Party primary election, 2022
Party	Candidate	Votes	%
Democratic	Peggy Rotundo, of Lewiston	691	100.00
Total votes		691	100.00

Maine State Senate 21st District Republican Party primary election, 2022
Party	Candidate	Votes	%
Republican	Ricky LaChapelle, of Lewiston	664	100.00
Total votes		664	100.00

==== General election ====
Maine State Senate 21st District general election, 2022
Party	Candidate	Votes	%
Democratic	Peggy Rotundo, of Lewiston	7,754	58.57
Republican	Ricky LaChapelle, of Lewiston	5,484	41.43
Total votes		13,238	100.00
Democratic hold			

=== District 22 ===
The 22nd district, in Cumberland, Oxford, and York counties, consisted of Limerick, Limington, Naples, Shapleigh, Standish, and 8 other municipalities. The new 22nd district was home to no incumbent senators. Republican James Libby was elected.

==== Primary elections ====
Maine State Senate 22nd District Democratic Party primary election, 2022
Party	Candidate	Votes	%
Democratic	Michael McKinney, of Cornish	1,366	100.00
Total votes		1,366	100.00

Maine State Senate 22nd District Republican Party primary election, 2022
Party	Candidate	Votes	%
Republican	James Libby, of Standish	1,969	100.00
Total votes		1,969	100.00

==== General election ====
Maine State Senate 22nd District general election, 2022
Party	Candidate	Votes	%
Republican	James Libby, of Standish	11,334	60.30
Democratic	Michael McKinney, of Cornish	7,463	39.70
Total votes		18,797	100.00
Republican win (new seat)			

=== District 23 ===
The 23rd district, in Cumberland County, consisted of Brunswick, Chebeague Island, Freeport, Harpswell, Pownal, and part of Yarmouth. The new 23rd district included the home of incumbent Democrat Mattie Daughtry, who had represented the 24th district since 2020. She was re-elected.

==== Primary elections ====
Maine State Senate 23rd District Democratic Party primary election, 2022
Party	Candidate	Votes	%
Democratic	Mattie Daughtry, of Brunswick (incumbent)	3,785	100.00
Total votes		3,785	100.00

Maine State Senate 23rd District Republican Party primary election, 2022
Party	Candidate	Votes	%
Republican	Brogan Teel, of Brunswick	1,160	100.00
Total votes		1,160	100.00

==== General election ====
Maine State Senate 23rd District general election, 2022
Party	Candidate	Votes	%
Democratic	Mattie Daughtry, of Brunswick (incumbent)	16,401	69.76
Republican	Brogan Teel, of Brunswick	7,108	30.24
Total votes		23,509	100.00
Democratic hold			

=== District 24 ===
The 24th district, in Lincoln and Sagadahoc counties, consisted of Bath, Bowdoinham, Richmond, Topsham, Woolwich, and 6 other municipalities. The new 24th district included the home of incumbent Democrat Eloise Vitelli, who had represented the 23rd district since 2016. She was re-elected.

==== Primary elections ====
Maine State Senate 24th District Democratic Party primary election, 2022
Party	Candidate	Votes	%
Democratic	Eloise Vitelli, of Arrowsic (incumbent)	2,078	100.00
Total votes		2,078	100.00

Maine State Senate 24th District Republican Party primary election, 2022
Party	Candidate	Votes	%
Republican	Matthew Brackley, of West Bath	1,444	100.00
Total votes		1,444	100.00

==== General election ====
Maine State Senate 24th District general election, 2022
Party	Candidate	Votes	%
Democratic	Eloise Vitelli, of Arrowsic (incumbent)	12,620	58.04
Republican	Matthew Brackley, of West Bath	9,123	41.96
Total votes		21,743	100.00
Democratic hold			

=== District 25 ===
The 25th district, in Cumberland County, consisted of Cumberland, Falmouth, Gray, Long Island, North Yarmouth, and part of Yarmouth. Incumbent Democrat Cathy Breen had represented the 25th district since 2014, and was term-limited. Democrat Teresa Pierce was elected.

==== Primary elections ====
Maine State Senate 25th District Democratic Party primary election, 2022
Party	Candidate	Votes	%
Democratic	Teresa Pierce, of Falmouth	3,634	100.00
Total votes		3,634	100.00

Maine State Senate 25th District Republican Party primary election, 2022
Party	Candidate	Votes	%
Republican	Jennifer White, of Gray	1,759	100.00
Total votes		1,759	100.00

==== General election ====
Maine State Senate 25th District general election, 2022
Party	Candidate	Votes	%
Democratic	Teresa Pierce, of Falmouth	15,315	63.39
Republican	Jennifer White, of Gray	8,845	36.61
Total votes		24,160	100.00
Democratic hold			

=== District 26 ===
The 26th district, in Cumberland County, consisted of Casco, Frye Island, Raymond, part of Westbrook, and Windham. Incumbent Democrat William Diamond had represented the 26th district since 2014, and was term-limited. Democrat Tim Nangle was elected.

==== Primary elections ====
Maine State Senate 26th District Democratic Party primary election, 2022
Party	Candidate	Votes	%
Democratic	Tim Nangle, of Windham	1,576	100.00
Total votes		1,576	100.00

Maine State Senate 26th District Republican Party primary election, 2022
Party	Candidate	Votes	%
Republican	Gary Plummer, of Windham	1,485	100.00
Total votes		1,485	100.00

==== General election ====
Maine State Senate 26th District general election, 2022
Party	Candidate	Votes	%
Democratic	Tim Nangle, of Windham	9,734	50.90
Republican	Gary Plummer, of Windham	9,388	49.10
Total votes		19,122	100.00
Democratic hold			

=== District 27 ===
The 27th district, in Cumberland County, consisted of parts of Portland and Westbrook. The new 27th district included the home of incumbent Democrat Heather Sanborn, who had represented the 28th district since 2018. She retired, and Democrat Jill Duson was elected.

==== Primary elections ====
Maine State Senate 27th District Democratic Party primary election, 2022
Party	Candidate	Votes	%
Democratic	Jill Duson, of Portland	3,233	89.68
Democratic	Kenneth Capron, of Portland	372	10.32
Total votes		3,605	100.00

Maine State Senate 27th District Republican Party primary election, 2022
Party	Candidate	Votes	%
Republican	Jeffrey Tounge, of Portland	604	100.00
Total votes		604	100.00

==== General election ====
Maine State Senate 27th District general election, 2022
Party	Candidate	Votes	%
Democratic	Jill Duson, of Portland	14,225	77.88
Republican	Jeffrey Tounge, of Portland	4,041	22.12
Total votes		18,266	100.00
Democratic hold			

=== District 28 ===
The 28th district, in Cumberland County, consisted of part of Portland. The new 28th district included the home of incumbent Democrat Ben Chipman, who had represented the 27th district since 2016. He was re-elected.

==== Primary elections ====
Maine State Senate 28th District Democratic Party primary election, 2022
Party	Candidate	Votes	%
Democratic	Ben Chipman, of Portland (incumbent)	3,484	100.00
Total votes		3,484	100.00

Maine State Senate 28th District Republican Party primary election, 2022
Party	Candidate	Votes	%
Republican	Ryan McMann, (Note: Withdrew on July 7, 2022, and was replaced by the state party with Susan Abercrombie on July 22, 2022.) of Portland	233	100.00
Total votes		233	100.00

==== General election ====
Maine State Senate 28th District general election, 2022
Party	Candidate	Votes	%
Democratic	Ben Chipman, of Portland (incumbent)	15,551	87.34
Republican	Susan Abercrombie, of Portland	2,254	12.66
Total votes		17,805	100.00
Democratic hold			

=== District 29 ===
The 29th district, in Cumberland County, consisted of Cape Elizabeth, part of Scarborough, and South Portland. Incumbent Democrat Anne Carney had represented the 29th district since 2020, and was re-elected.

==== Primary elections ====
Maine State Senate 29th District Democratic Party primary election, 2022
Party	Candidate	Votes	%
Democratic	Anne Carney, of Cape Elizabeth (incumbent)	2,912	100.00
Total votes		2,912	100.00

Maine State Senate 29th District Republican Party primary election, 2022
Party	Candidate	Votes	%
Republican	John Lewis, of Cape Elizabeth	585	100.00
Total votes		585	100.00

==== General election ====
Maine State Senate 29th District general election, 2022
Party	Candidate	Votes	%
Democratic	Anne Carney, of Cape Elizabeth (incumbent)	15,432	75.48
Republican	John Lewis, of Cape Elizabeth	5,012	24.52
Total votes		20,444	100.00
Democratic hold			

=== District 30 ===
The 30th district, in Cumberland County, consisted of Gorham and part of Scarborough. Incumbent Democrat Stacy Brenner had represented the 30th district since 2020, and was re-elected.

==== Primary elections ====
Maine State Senate 30th District Democratic Party primary election, 2022
Party	Candidate	Votes	%
Democratic	Stacy Brenner, of Scarborough (incumbent)	2,059	100.00
Total votes		2,059	100.00

Maine State Senate 30th District Republican Party primary election, 2022
Party	Candidate	Votes	%
Republican	Timothy Thorsen, of Gorham	1,248	100.00
Total votes		1,248	100.00

==== General election ====
Maine State Senate 30th District general election, 2022
Party	Candidate	Votes	%
Democratic	Stacy Brenner, of Scarborough (incumbent)	12,685	62.03
Republican	Timothy Thorsen, of Gorham	7,766	37.97
Total votes		20,451	100.00
Democratic hold			

=== District 31 ===
The 31st district, in York County, consisted of Buxton, Old Orchard Beach, and Saco. Incumbent Democrat Donna Bailey had represented the 31st district since 2020, and was re-elected.

==== Primary elections ====
Maine State Senate 31st District Democratic Party primary election, 2022
Party	Candidate	Votes	%
Democratic	Donna Bailey, of Saco (incumbent)	1,952	100.00
Total votes		1,952	100.00

Maine State Senate 31st District Republican Party primary election, 2022
Party	Candidate	Votes	%
Republican	Sharri MacDonald, of Old Orchard Beach	902	100.00
Total votes		902	100.00

==== General election ====
Maine State Senate 31st District general election, 2022
Party	Candidate	Votes	%
Democratic	Donna Bailey, of Saco (incumbent)	11,244	59.02
Republican	Sharri MacDonald, of Old Orchard Beach	7,806	40.98
Total votes		19,050	100.00
Democratic hold			

=== District 32 ===
The 32nd district, in York County, consisted of Arundel, Biddeford, Dayton, Hollis, and Lyman. Incumbent Democrat Susan Deschambault had represented the 32nd district since 2016, and was term-limited. Democrat Henry Ingwersen was elected.

==== Primary elections ====
Maine State Senate 32nd District Democratic Party primary election, 2022
Party	Candidate	Votes	%
Democratic	Henry Ingwersen, of Arundel	1,430	100.00
Total votes		1,430	100.00

Maine State Senate 32nd District Republican Party primary election, 2022
Party	Candidate	Votes	%
Republican	David Corbett, of Lyman	1,074	100.00
Total votes		1,074	100.00

==== General election ====
Maine State Senate 32nd District general election, 2022
Party	Candidate	Votes	%
Democratic	Henry Ingwersen, of Arundel	9,676	57.31
Republican	David Corbett, of Lyman	7,209	42.69
Total votes		16,885	100.00
Democratic hold			

=== District 33 ===
The 33rd district, in York County, consisted of Alfred, Lebanon, Sanford, and Waterboro. Incumbent Republican David Woodsome had represented the 33rd district since 2014, and was term-limited. Republican Matthew Harrington was elected.

==== Primary elections ====
Maine State Senate 33rd District Democratic Party primary election, 2022
Party	Candidate	Votes	%
Democratic	Kendra Williams, of Sanford	1,137	100.00
Total votes		1,137	100.00

Maine State Senate 33rd District Republican Party primary election, 2022
Party	Candidate	Votes	%
Republican	Matthew Harrington, of Sanford	1,263	100.00
Total votes		1,263	100.00

==== General election ====
Maine State Senate 33rd District general election, 2022
Party	Candidate	Votes	%
Republican	Matthew Harrington, of Sanford	8,509	54.07
Democratic	Kendra Williams, of Sanford	7,228	45.93
Total votes		15,737	100.00
Republican hold			

=== District 34 ===
The 34th district, in York County, consisted of Berwick, Kennebunk, Kennebunkport, North Berwick, and Wells. Incumbent Democrat Joe Rafferty had represented the 34th district since 2020, and was re-elected.

==== Primary elections ====
Maine State Senate 34th District Democratic Party primary election, 2022
Party	Candidate	Votes	%
Democratic	Joe Rafferty, of Kennebunk (incumbent)	2,541	100.00
Total votes		2,541	100.00

Maine State Senate 34th District Republican Party primary election, 2022
Party	Candidate	Votes	%
Republican	Bradley Ducharme, of Kennebunk	1,751	100.00
Total votes		1,751	100.00

==== General election ====
Maine State Senate 34th District general election, 2022
Party	Candidate	Votes	%
Democratic	Joe Rafferty, of Kennebunk (incumbent)	12,605	58.22
Republican	Bradley Ducharme, of Kennebunk	9,044	41.78
Total votes		21,649	100.00
Democratic hold			

=== District 35 ===
The 35th district, in York County, consisted of Eliot, Kittery, Ogunquit, South Berwick, and York. Incumbent Democrat Mark Lawrence had represented the 35th district since 2018, and was re-elected.

==== Primary elections ====
Maine State Senate 35th District Democratic Party primary election, 2022
Party	Candidate	Votes	%
Democratic	Mark Lawrence, of Eliot (incumbent)	2,089	100.00
Total votes		2,089	100.00

Maine State Senate 35th District Republican Party primary election, 2022
Party	Candidate	Votes	%
Republican	Julie Rakic, of Kittery	1,017	100.00
Total votes		1,017	100.00

==== General election ====
Maine State Senate 35th District general election, 2022
Party	Candidate	Votes	%
Democratic	Mark Lawrence, of Eliot (incumbent)	13,979	65.00
Republican	Julie Rakic, of Kittery	7,527	35.00
Total votes		21,506	100.00
Democratic hold			

== See also ==
- 2022 Maine elections
- List of Maine state legislatures
