= 2020 Maine Senate election =

- November 3, 2020

All 35 seats in the Maine Senate 18 seats needed for a majority
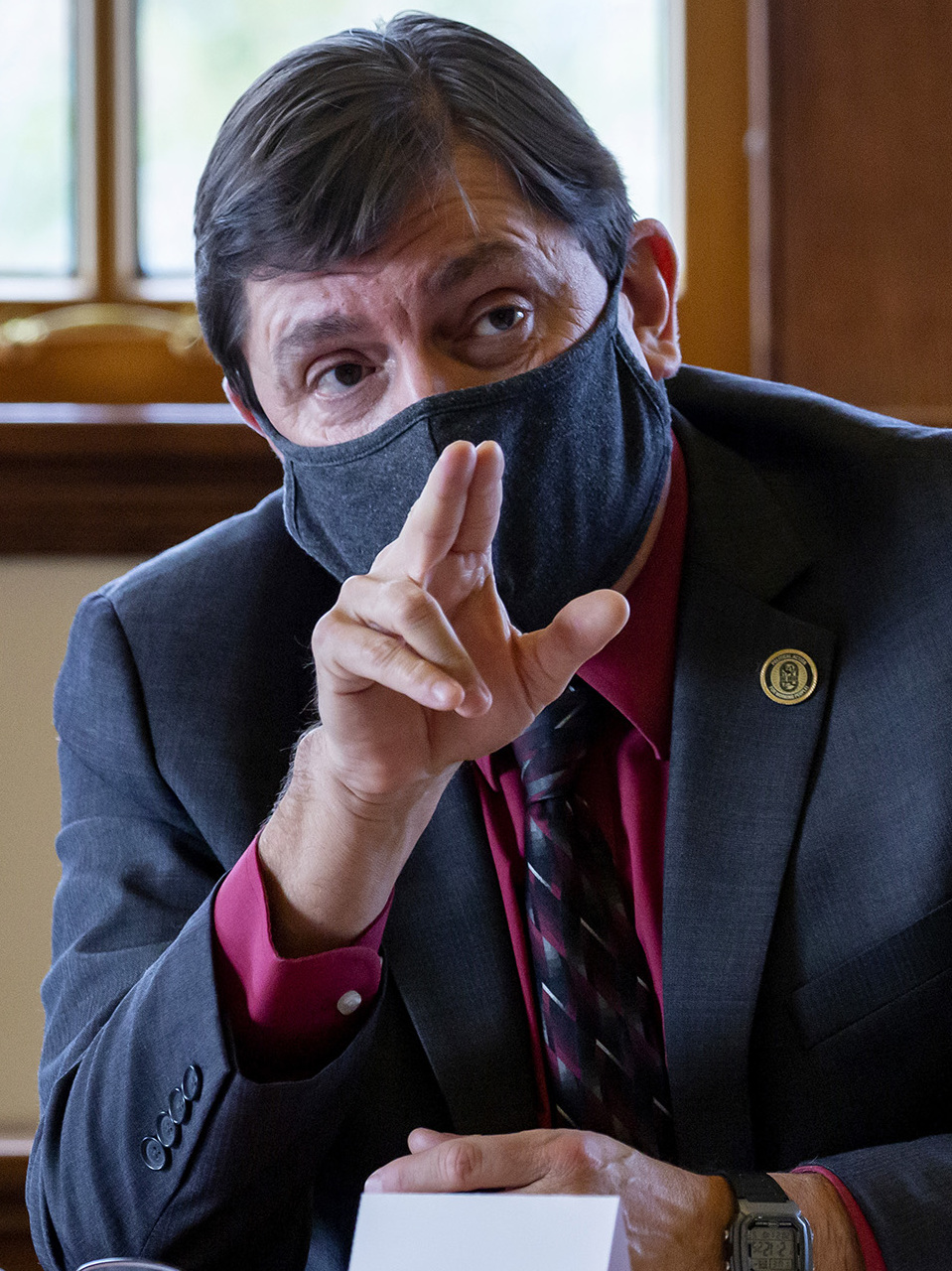

	Majority party	Minority party
Leader	Troy Jackson	Dana Dow
Party	Democratic	Republican
Leader's seat	1st	13th (lost re-election)
Seats before	21	14
Seats won	22	13
Seat change	▲1	▼1
Popular vote	418,062	369,474
Percentage	52.9%	46.7%
Swing	▼3.0%	▲3.5%
- Results: Democratic hold Democratic gain Republican hold Republican gain
Senate President before election
Troy Jackson
Democratic
Elected Senate President
Troy Jackson
Democratic

The 2020 Maine State Senate election was held on Tuesday, November 3, 2020, with the primary election using instant-runoff voting being held on July 14, 2020, to elect the 130th Maine Senate. Voters in all 35 districts of the Maine State Senate elected their senators. The elections coincided with the elections for other offices, including for U.S. president, U.S. Senate, U.S. House and the Maine House of Representatives. Republicans only needed to gain four seats to win control of the chamber; they instead gained only one and lost another two, resulting in a net increase in the Democratic Party's majority.

The primary elections were held on July 14, 2020.

== Background ==
In the 2018 Maine State Senate elections, Democrats gained control by a 21–14 margin. Before those elections, Republicans had controlled the chamber since the 2014 Maine State Senate elections.

== Predictions ==
Source	Ranking	As of
The Cook Political Report	Lean D	October 21, 2020

== Results ==
=== Overview ===
↓
22	13
Democratic	Republican

Results
Parties	Candidates	Popular vote		Seats			
Parties	Candidates	Vote	%	2018	2020	+/−	Strength
Democratic	35	418,062	52.85%	21	22	▲1	62.86%
Republican	33	369,474	46.71%	14	13	▼1	37.14%
Independent	2	3,479	0.44%	0	0	Steady	0.00%
Total	70	791,015	100.00%	35	35		100.00%

=== Closest races ===
Seats where the margin of victory was under 10%:

1. District 13, 2.96% gain
2. District 34, 3.72% gain
3. District 20, 6.84%
4. District 11, 8.32%
5. District 30, 9.6%

=== Detailed results ===
Source: Official candidate listings.

==== District 1 ====
2020 Maine State Senate election, District 1
Party	Candidate	Votes	%
Democratic	Troy Jackson (incumbent)	10,037	59.37
Republican	Brian Schaefer	7,485	40.63
Total votes		18,422	100.00
Democratic hold			

==== District 2 ====
2020 Maine State Senate election, District 2
Party	Candidate	Votes	%
Republican	Harold "Trey" Stewart	10,838	56.90
Democratic	Michael Carpenter (incumbent)	8,208	43.10
Total votes		19,705	100.00
Republican gain from Democratic			

==== District 3 ====
2020 Maine State Senate election, District 3
Party	Candidate	Votes	%
Republican	Brad Farrin (incumbent)	12,920	68.44
Democratic	Katherine Wilder	5,957	31.56
Total votes		18,877	100.00
Republican hold			

==== District 4 ====
2020 Maine State Senate election, District 4
Primary election
Party	Candidate	Votes	%
Republican	Paul T. Davis (incumbent)	2,910	67.7%
Republican	Douglas Thomas	1,388	32.3%
Total votes		4,298	100.0%
General election
Republican	Paul T. Davis (incumbent)	14,817	76.20
Democratic	David Ziemer	4,629	23.80
Total votes		19,446	100.00
Republican hold			

==== District 5 ====
2020 Maine State Senate election, District 5
Party	Candidate	Votes	%
Democratic	James Dill (incumbent)	11,571	57.99
Republican	Christian Ireland	8,381	42.01
Total votes		19,952	100.00
Democratic hold			

==== District 6 ====
2020 Maine State Senate election, District 6
Party	Candidate	Votes	%
Republican	Marianne Moore (incumbent)	11,853	62.82
Democratic	Jeffrey Lovit	6,793	37.18
Total votes		18,869	100.00
Republican hold			

==== District 7 ====
2020 Maine State Senate election, District 7
Primary election
Party	Candidate	Votes	%
Republican	Brian Langley	2,817	72.3%
Republican	John Linnehan	1,081	27.7%
Total votes		3,898	100.0%
General election
Democratic	Louis Luchini (incumbent)	14,280	55.02
Republican	Brian Langley	11,672	44.98
Total votes		25,952	100.00
Democratic hold			

==== District 8 ====
2020 Maine State Senate election, District 8
Primary election
Party	Candidate	Votes	%
Democratic	Beverly Uhlenhake	2,256	67.6%
Democratic	Trudy Scee	1,080	32.4%
Total votes		3,336	100.0%
Republican	Kimberley Rosen (incumbent)	2,082	50.6%
Republican	Lawrence Lockman	2,030	49.4%
Total votes		4,112	100.0%
General election
Republican	Kimberley Rosen (incumbent)	13,113	57.83
Democratic	Beverly Uhlenhake	8,332	36.74
Independent	Teresa Montague	1,231	5.43
Total votes		22,676	100.00
Republican hold			

==== District 9 ====
2020 Maine State Senate election, District 9
Primary election
Party	Candidate	Votes	%
Democratic	Joe Baldacci	2,065	52.8%
Democratic	Victoria Kornfield	1,847	47.2%
Total votes		3,912	100.0%
General election
Democratic	Joe Baldacci	10,960	55.04
Republican	Sean Hinkley	6,706	33.67
Independent	Kristie Miner	2,248	11.29
Total votes		19,914	100.00
Democratic hold			

==== District 10 ====
2020 Maine State Senate election, District 10
Party	Candidate	Votes	%
Republican	Stacey Guerin (incumbent)	14,508	69.80
Democratic	Frederick Austin	6,278	30.20
Total votes		20,786	100.00
Republican hold			

==== District 11 ====
2020 Maine State Senate election, District 11 - Round 1
Primary election
Party	Candidate	Votes	%
Democratic	Glenn Curry	1,858	44.58%
Democratic	Robyn Stanicki	1,280	30.71%
Democratic	Charles Pattavina	1,030	24.71%
Total votes		4,168	100.00%

2020 Maine State Senate election, District 11 - Round 2
Primary election
Party	Candidate	Votes	%
Democratic	Glenn Curry	2,244	56.74%
Democratic	Robyn Stanicki	1,711	43.26%
Democratic	Charles Pattavina	0	0.00%
Total votes		3,955	100.00%
General election
Democratic	Glenn Curry	12,789	54.16
Republican	Duncan Milne	10,826	45.84
Total votes		23,615	100.00
Democratic hold			

==== District 12 ====
2020 Maine State Senate election, District 12
Party	Candidate	Votes	%
Democratic	David Miramant (incumbent)	14,049	57.60
Republican	Gordon Page	10,342	42.40
Total votes		24,391	100.00
Democratic hold			

==== District 13 ====
2020 Maine State Senate election, District 13
Party	Candidate	Votes	%
Democratic	Chloe Maxmin	12,806	51.48
Republican	Dana Dow (incumbent)	12,072	48.52
Total votes		24,878	100.00
Democratic gain from Republican			

==== District 14 ====
2020 Maine State Senate election, District 14
Primary election
Party	Candidate	Votes	%
Democratic	Shenna Bellows (incumbent)	4,285	90.9%
Democratic	Danielle Grondin-Stevens	431	9.1%
Total votes		4,716	100.0%
General election
Democratic	Shenna Bellows (incumbent)	12,998	56.06
Republican	Mark Walker	10,189	43.94
Total votes		23,737	100.00
Democratic hold			

==== District 15 ====
2020 Maine State Senate election, District 15
Party	Candidate	Votes	%
Republican	Matthew Pouliot (incumbent)	12,167	57.38
Democratic	Kalie Hess	9,039	42.62
Total votes		21,206	100.00
Republican hold			

==== District 16 ====
2020 Maine State Senate election, District 16
Party	Candidate	Votes	%
Republican	Scott Cyrway (incumbent)	11,456	56.22
Democratic	Hilary Koch	8,920	43.78
Total votes		20,376	100.00
Republican hold			

==== District 17 ====
2020 Maine State Senate election, District 17
Party	Candidate	Votes	%
Republican	Russell Black (incumbent)	12,776	58.58
Democratic	Jan Collins	9,032	41.42
Total votes		21,808	100.00
Republican hold			

==== District 18 ====
2020 Maine State Senate election, District 18
Party	Candidate	Votes	%
Republican	Lisa Keim (incumbent)	14,247	67.56
Democratic	Gabriel Perkins	6,840	32.44
Total votes		21,087	100.00
Republican hold			

==== District 19 ====
2020 Maine State Senate election, District 19
Party	Candidate	Votes	%
Republican	Rick Bennett	13,581	59.61
Democratic	Katherine Branch	9,202	40.39
Total votes		22,783	100.00
Republican hold			

==== District 20 ====
2020 Maine State Senate election, District 20
Party	Candidate	Votes	%
Democratic	Ned Claxton (incumbent)	11,884	53.42
Republican	Matthew Leonard	10,361	46.58
Total votes		22,245	100.00
Democratic hold			

==== District 21 ====
2020 Maine State Senate election, District 21
Party	Candidate	Votes	%
Democratic	Nathan Libby (incumbent)	10,171	59.64
Republican	Timothy Gallant	6,882	40.36
Total votes		17,053	100.00
Democratic hold			

==== District 22 ====
2020 Maine State Senate election, District 22
Party	Candidate	Votes	%
Republican	Jeff Timberlake (incumbent)	13,270	60.65
Democratic	Martha Poliquin	8,610	39.35
Total votes		21,880	100.00
Republican hold			

==== District 23 ====
2020 Maine State Senate election, District 23
Party	Candidate	Votes	%
Democratic	Eloise Vitelli (incumbent)	13,810	55.84
Republican	Holly Kopp	10,922	44.16
Total votes			
Democratic hold			

==== District 24 ====
2020 Maine State Senate election, District 24
Primary election
Party	Candidate	Votes	%
Democratic	Matthea Daughtry	6,902	79.6%
Democratic	Stan Gerzofsky	1,769	20.4%
Total votes		8,671	100.0%
General election
Democratic	Matthea Daughtry	18,297	66.17
Republican	Brad Pattershall	9,353	33.83
Total votes		27,650	100.00
Democratic hold			

==== District 25 ====
2020 Maine State Senate election, District 25
Party	Candidate	Votes	%
Democratic	Catherine Breen (incumbent)	18,587	61.98
Republican	Jennifer White	11,404	38.02
Total votes		29,991	100.00
Democratic hold			

==== District 26 ====
2020 Maine State Senate election, District 26
Party	Candidate	Votes	%
Democratic	Bill Diamond (incumbent)	14,267	60.75
Republican	Karen Lockwood	9,219	39.25
Total votes		23,486	100.00
Democratic hold			

==== District 27 ====
2020 Maine State Senate election, District 27
Party	Candidate	Votes	%
Democratic	Benjamin Chipman (incumbent)	21,514	100.00
Total votes		21,514	100.00
Democratic hold			

==== District 28 ====
2020 Maine State Senate election, District 28
Party	Candidate	Votes	%
Democratic	Heather Sanborn (incumbent)	20,173	100.00
Total votes		20,173	100.00
Democratic hold			

==== District 29 ====
2020 Maine State Senate election, District 29
Primary election
Party	Candidate	Votes	%
Democratic	Anne Carney	4,931	57.6%
Democratic	Sari Greene	2,537	29.6%
Democratic	Eben Rose	1,098	12.8%
Total votes		8,566	100.0%
General election
Democratic	Anne Carney	16,847	67.21
Republican	Stephanie Anderson	8,221	32.79
Total votes		25,068	100.00
Democratic hold			

==== District 30 ====
2020 Maine State Senate election, District 30
Party	Candidate	Votes	%
Democratic	Stacy Brenner	14,960	53.93
Republican	Sara Rivard	12,778	46.07
Total votes		27,738	100.00
Democratic hold			

==== District 31 ====
2020 Maine State Senate election, District 31
Party	Candidate	Votes	%
Democratic	Donna Bailey	13,266	54.65
Republican	Craig Pendleton	11,007	45.35
Total votes		24,273	100.00
Democratic hold			

==== District 32 ====
2020 Maine State Senate election, District 32
Party	Candidate	Votes	%
Democratic	Susan Deschambault (incumbent)	12,838	57.18
Republican	Robert Daigle	9,612	42.82
Total votes		22,450	100.00
Democratic hold			

==== District 33 ====
2020 Maine State Senate election, District 33
Party	Candidate	Votes	%
Republican	David Woodsome (incumbent)	13,408	62.79
Democratic	Michael McKinney	7,947	37.21
Total votes		21,355	100.00
Republican hold			

==== District 34 ====
2020 Maine State Senate election, District 34
Party	Candidate	Votes	%
Democratic	Joseph Rafferty	13,949	51.86
Republican	Michael Pardue	12,947	48.14
Total votes		26,896	100.00
Democratic gain from Republican			

==== District 35 ====
2020 Maine State Senate election, District 35
Party	Candidate	Votes	%
Democratic	Mark Lawrence (incumbent)	17,099	62.63
Republican	Bradley Moulton	10,204	37.37
Total votes		27,303	100.00
Democratic hold			

== See also ==
- 2020 Maine elections
- List of Maine state legislatures
