= Maine's 18th State Senate district =

American legislative district

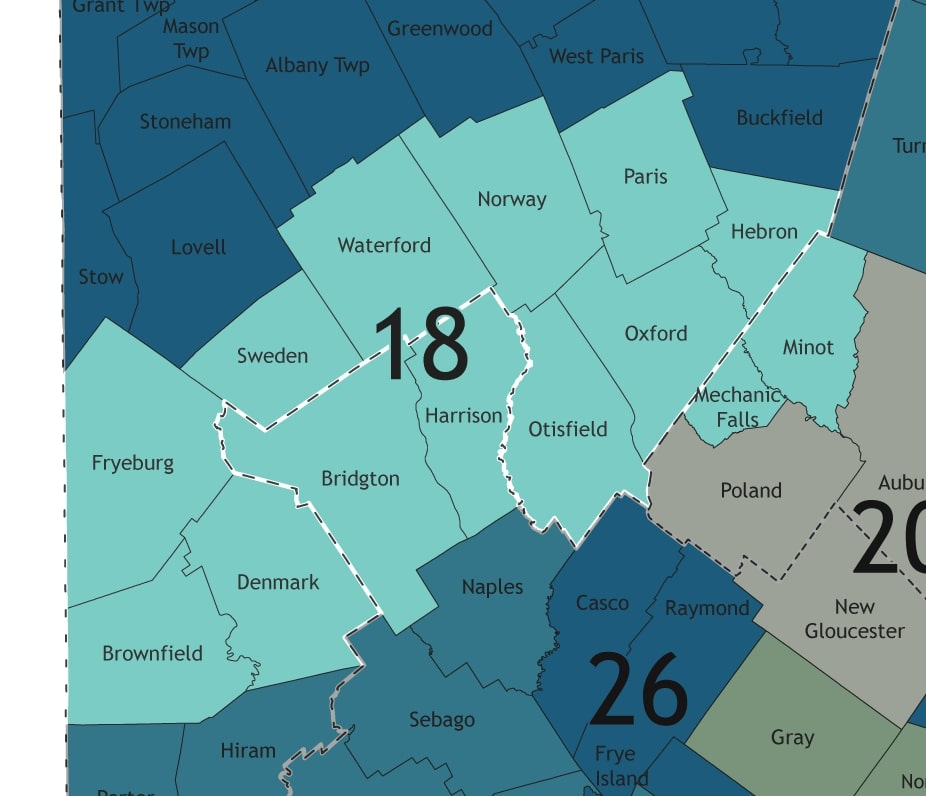
Senator
Rick Bennett; I–Oxford
- Population (2020): 39,846

Maine's 18th State Senate district is one of 35 districts in the Maine Senate. It has been represented by Independent Rick Bennett since 2022.

== Geography ==
District 18 is largely made up by part of Oxford County, including its county seat of Paris. It also includes the towns of Mechanic Falls and Minot of Androscoggin County, and the towns of Bridgton and Harrison of Cumberland County.

Androscoggin County - 5.1% of county

Cumberland County - 2.5% of county

Oxford County - 44.5% of county

Androscoggin:

Towns:

- Mechanic Falls
- Minot

Cumberland:

Towns:

- Bridgton
- Harrison

Oxford:

Towns:

- Brownfield
- Denmark
- Fryeburg
- Hebron
- Norway
- Otisfield
- Oxford
- Paris
- Sweden

== Recent election results ==
=== 2022 ===
2022 Maine State Senate election, District 18
Party	Candidate	Votes	%
Republican	Rick Bennett	11,931	62.5
Democratic	Colin O'Neill	7,171	37.5
Total votes		19,102	100.0
Republican hold			

Elections prior to 2022 were held under different district lines.

=== 2024 ===
2024 Maine State Senate election, District 18
Party	Candidate	Votes	%
Republican	Rick Bennett	15,206	64.7
Democratic	Linda Miller	8,310	35.3
Total votes		23,516	100.0
Republican hold			

== Historical election results ==
=== 2012 ===
2012 Maine State Senate election, District 18
Party	Candidate	Votes	%
Republican	Thomas Saviello	12,723	61.9
Democratic	Joanne Dunlap	7,844	38.1
Total votes		20,567	100
Republican hold			

=== 2014 ===
Note: (Note: This election was a Democratic hold, as Patrick had been redistricted from the 14th district in early 2014)

2014 Maine State Senate election, District 18
Party	Candidate	Votes	%
Democratic	John Patrick	9,136	51.6
Republican	Joseph Martin	7,714	43.5
Blank votes	None	866	4.9
Total votes		17,716	100
Democratic hold			

=== 2016 ===
2016 Maine State Senate election, District 18
Party	Candidate	Votes	%
Republican	Lisa Keim	11,603	56.2
Democratic	John Patrick	9,040	43.8
Total votes		20,643	100
Republican gain from Democratic			

=== 2018 ===
2018 Maine State Senate election, District 18
Party	Candidate	Votes	%
Republican	Lisa Keim	10,966	65.4
Democratic	James Wilfong	5,789	34.6
Total votes		16,755	100
Republican hold			

=== 2020 ===
2020 Maine State Senate election, District 18
Party	Candidate	Votes	%
Republican	Lisa Keim	12,776	67.6
Democratic	Gabriel Perkins	6,840	32.4
Total votes		14,247	100
Republican hold			
