= 2020 United States House of Representatives elections in Maine =

2020 United States House of Representatives Elections in Maine
- November 3, 2020

All 2 Maine seats to the United States House of Representatives
| | Majority party | Minority party |
|---|---|---|
| Party | Democratic | Republican |
| Last election | 2 | 0 |
| Seats won | 2 | 0 |
| Seat change | Steady | Steady |
| Popular vote | 468,978 | 340,236 |
| Percentage | 57.95% | 42.04% |
| Swing | ▲2.83% | ▲1.92% |

Democratic
50–60%
60–70%
Republican
50–60%

The 2020 United States House of Representatives elections in Maine were held on November 3, 2020, to elect the two U.S. representatives from the state of Maine, one from each of the state's two congressional districts. The elections coincided with the 2020 U.S. presidential election, as well as other elections to the House of Representatives, elections to the United States Senate and various state and local elections. The election was conducted with ranked choice voting, as per the result of a referendum passed in 2016.

Party primaries were initially scheduled to take place on June 9, 2020. They were rescheduled by Gov. Janet Mills to July 14, 2020, due to the COVID-19 pandemic. Mills' executive order also expanded the ability to request absentee ballots, which may now be done up to and on election day. Parties that qualified to participate in the 2020 primary election were the Democratic Party, the Green Independent Party, and the Republican Party. Two candidates in District 1 and four candidates in District 2 filed petitions with the secretary of state by March 16, 2020. Non-party candidates could also file petitions to be included on the ballot by June 1, 2020.

== Overview ==
| District | Democratic | | Republican | | Others | | Total | | Result |
| District | Votes | % | Votes | % | Votes | % | Votes | % | Result |
|---|---|---|---|---|---|---|---|---|---|
| District 1 | 271,004 | 62.15% | 165,008 | 37.84% | 15 | 0.00% | 436,027 | 100.0% | Democratic hold |
| District 2 | 197,974 | 53.04% | 175,228 | 46.95% | 33 | 0.01% | 373,235 | 100.0% | Democratic hold |
| Total | 468,978 | 57.95% | 340,236 | 42.04% | 48 | 0.01% | 809,262 | 100.0% | |

Popular vote
| Democratic | 57.95% |
| Republican | 42.04% |
| Other | 0.01% |

House seats
| Democratic | 100.00% |

== District 1 ==
2020 Maine's 1st congressional district election
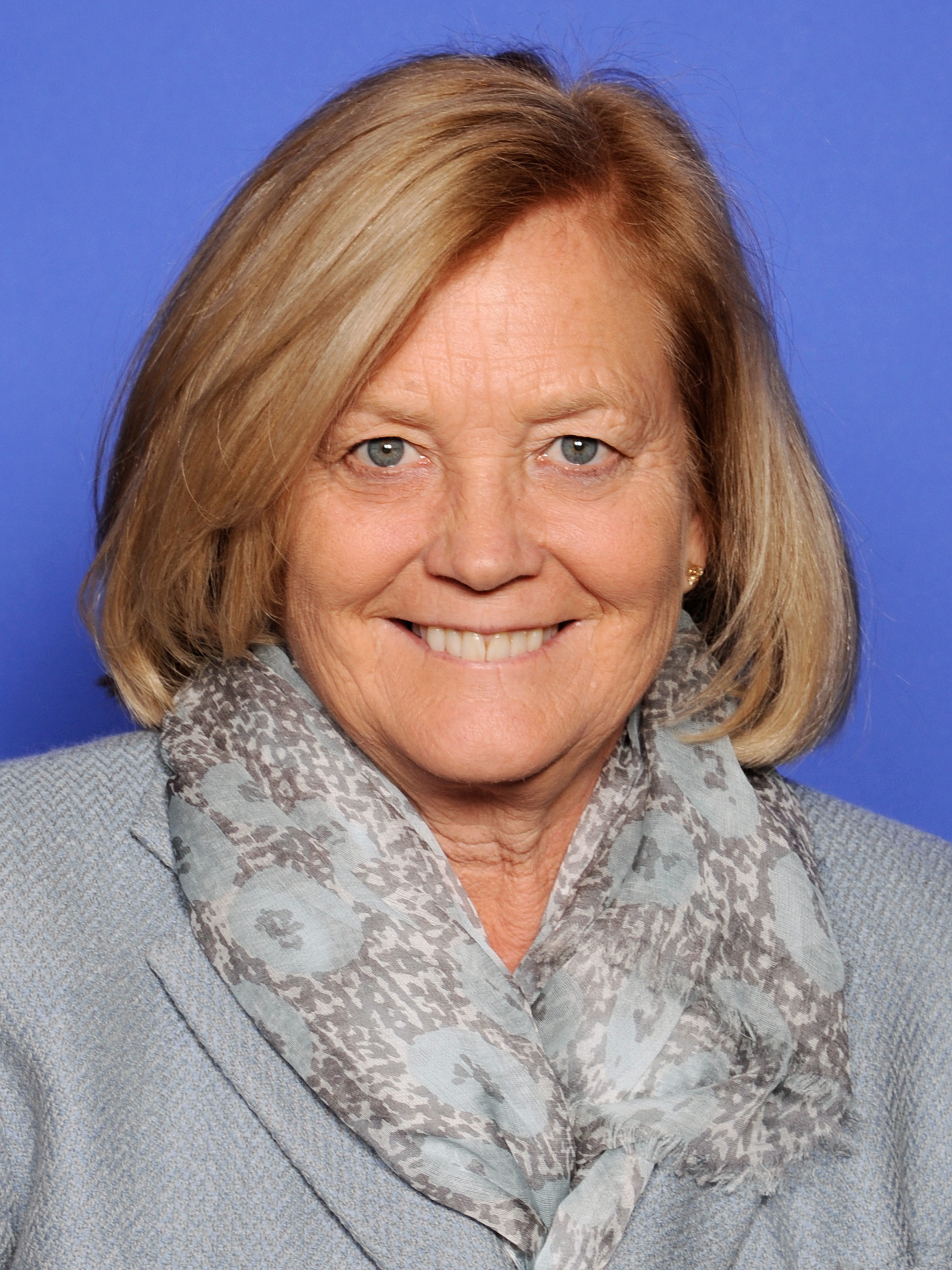

| Nominee | Chellie Pingree | Jay Allen |
| Party | Democratic | Republican |
| Popular vote | 271,004 | 165,008 |
| Percentage | 62.2% | 37.8% |
- Pingree: 50–60% 60–70% 70–80% 80–90% >90% Allen: 50–60% 60–70% No votes
U.S. Representative before election
Chellie Pingree
Democratic
Elected U.S. Representative
Chellie Pingree
Democratic

The 1st district encompasses the southern coastal area of the state, taking in Portland, Augusta, Brunswick and Saco. The incumbent was Democrat Chellie Pingree, who was re-elected with 58.8% of the vote in 2018.

=== Democratic primary ===
==== Candidates ====
===== Declared =====
- Chellie Pingree, incumbent U.S. Representative

==== Primary results ====
Democratic primary results
| Party | Candidate | Votes | % |
|---|---|---|---|
| Democratic | Chellie Pingree (incumbent) | 102,773 | 100.0 |
| Total votes | | 102,773 | 100.0 |

=== Republican primary ===
==== Candidates ====
===== Declared =====
- Jay Allen, physician

==== Primary results ====
Republican primary results
| Party | Candidate | Votes | % |
|---|---|---|---|
| Republican | Jay Allen | 31,124 | 100.0 |
| Total votes | | 31,124 | 100.0 |

=== General election ===
==== Debate ====
2022 Maine's 1st congressional district debate
| No. | Date | Host | Moderator | Link | Democratic | Republican |
| Key: P Participant A Absent N Not invited I Invited W Withdrawn | | | | | | |
| Key: P Participant A Absent N Not invited I Invited W Withdrawn | | | | | Chellie Pingree | Jay Allen |
|---|---|---|---|---|---|---|
| 1 | Oct. 21, 2020 | Maine Public; Broadcasting Network | Jennifer Rooks | | P | P |

==== Predictions ====
| Source | Ranking | As of |
|---|---|---|
| The Cook Political Report | Safe D | October 2, 2020 |
| Inside Elections | Safe D | October 1, 2020 |
| Sabato's Crystal Ball | Safe D | October 1, 2020 |
| Politico | Safe D | September 8, 2020 |
| Daily Kos | Safe D | September 25, 2020 |
| RCP | Safe D | June 9, 2020 |
| Niskanen | Safe D | July 26, 2020 |

==== Polling ====
| Poll source | Date(s) administered | Sample size (Note: Key: A – all adults RV – registered voters LV – likely voters V – unclear) | Margin of error | Chellie Pingree (D) | Jay Allen (R) | Other/ Undecided |
|---|---|---|---|---|---|---|
| Colby College | October 21–25, 2020 | 426 (LV) | – | 58% | 31% | 11% (Note: Undecided with 11%) |
| Pan Atlantic Research | October 2–6, 2020 | 300 (LV) | ± 6.4% | 54% | 35% | 11% |
| Critical Insights | September 25 – October 4, 2020 | 232 (LV) | – | 58% | 24% | 18% (Note: "Someone else" with 3%; "Refused" with 2%; would not vote with 1%; Undecided with 12%) |
| Critical Insights | July 28 – August 10, 2020 | 233 (LV) | – | 50% | 22% | 27% (Note: "Someone else" with 4%; "Prefer not to say" with 1%; would not vote with no voters; Undecided with 22%) |

==== Results ====
Maine's 1st congressional district, 2020
| Party | Candidate | Votes | % |
|---|---|---|---|
| Democratic | Chellie Pingree (incumbent) | 271,004 | 62.2 |
| Republican | Jay Allen | 165,008 | 37.8 |
| Write-in | | 15 | 0.0 |
| Total votes | | 436,027 | 100.0 |
| Democratic hold | | | |

== District 2 ==
2020 Maine's 2nd congressional district election
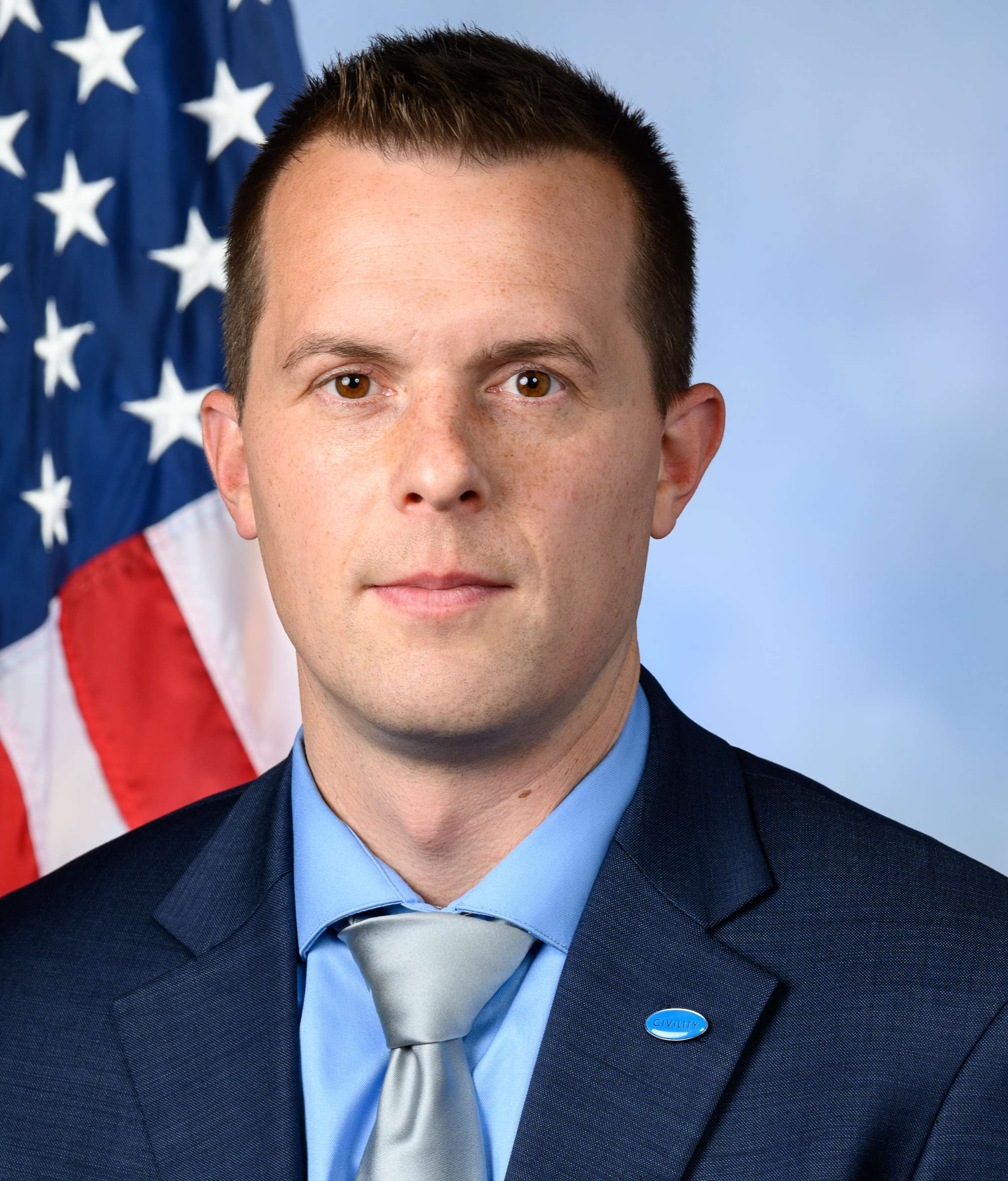

| Nominee | Jared Golden | Dale Crafts |
| Party | Democratic | Republican |
| Popular vote | 197,974 | 175,228 |
| Percentage | 53.04% | 46.95% |
- Golden: 50–60% 60–70% 70–80% 80–90% Crafts: 50–60% 60–70% 70–80% 80–90% >90% Tie: 50% No votes
U.S. Representative before election
Jared Golden
Democratic
Elected U.S. Representative
Jared Golden
Democratic

The 2nd district covers most of northern rural Maine, including the cities of Lewiston, Bangor, Auburn and Presque Isle. The incumbent was Democrat Jared Golden, who flipped the district and was elected with 50.6% of the vote in 2018, making him the first member of Congress to be elected by ranked choice voting. Donald Trump won the district in the concurrent presidential election.

=== Democratic primary ===
==== Candidates ====
===== Declared =====
- Jared Golden, incumbent U.S. representative

==== Endorsements ====
Jared Golden

Federal officials

- William Cohen, former U.S. senator (Republican)

Organizations

- End Citizens United
- J Street PAC
- League of Conservation Voters Action Fund
- NARAL Pro-Choice America
- Planned Parenthood Action Fund
- Sierra Club
- VoteVets

==== Primary results ====
Democratic primary results
| Party | Candidate | Votes | % |
|---|---|---|---|
| Democratic | Jared Golden (incumbent) | 57,718 | 100.0 |
| Total votes | | 57,718 | 100.0 |

=== Republican primary ===
==== On the ballot ====
- Adrienne Bennett, press secretary for former governor Paul LePage
- Eric Brakey, former state senator and nominee for U.S. Senate in 2018
- Dale Crafts, former state representative

==== Declined ====
- Travis Mills, retired U.S. Army staff sergeant
- Bruce Poliquin, former U.S. representative

==== Endorsements ====
Adrienne Bennett

Federal officials

- Elise Stefanik, U.S. representative (NY-21)

Organizations

- Elevate PAC
- Susan B. Anthony List Candidate Fund
- Value in Electing Women (VIEW) PAC
Eric Brakey

Federal officials

- Rand Paul, U.S. senator (KY)

State officials

- Paul Davis, state senator and former state representative (2008-2014), state Senate minority leader (2004-2006), and state senator (1998-2006) (co-endorsed with Dale Crafts)

Organizations

- Club for Growth
- FreedomWorks
- Protect Freedom PAC
Dale Crafts

Federal officials

- Dan Crenshaw, U.S. representative (TX-2)
- Donald Trump, President of the United States (2017-2021)

U.S. Governors

- Paul LePage, former governor of Maine (2011-2019) and 2022 Republican gubernatorial candidate
- Kristi Noem, Governor of South Dakota

State officials

- Bernard Ayotte, former state representative (2006-2014)
- Kevin Battle, former state representative (2014-2018)
- Robert Berube, former state representative (2002-2008)
- Russell Black, state senator and former state representative (2010-2018)
- David C. Burns, former state senator (2012-2016)
- Richard Cebra, state representative and former Maine Republican Party chair (2012-2013) and state representative (2004-2012)
- Patrick Corey, state representative
- Dean Cray, former state representative (2008-2014)
- Andre Cushing III, former state senator (2012-2018), state Senate assistant majority leader, and state representative (2008-2012)
- Scott Cyrway, state senator
- Douglas Damon, former state representative (2010-2012)
- Paul Davis, state senator and former state representative (2008-2014), state senator (2002-2006), and state Senate minority leader (2004-2006) (co-endorsed with Eric Brakey)
- Peter Doak, former state representative (2012-2014)
- Dana Dow, state senator and state Senate minority leader
- Gary Drinkwater, state representative
- Bradlee Farrin, state senator and former state representative (2014-2018)
- Jeffery Gifford, former state representative (2006-2014)
- Randall Greenwood, former state representative (2014-2016)
- James Hamper, state senator and former state representative (2004-2012)
- Jeffery Hanley, state representative (co-endorsed with Eric Brakey)
- Gary Hilliard, former state representative (2014-2018)
- Brian Hobart, former state representative (2014-2016)
- Peter Johnson, former state representative (2008-2014)
- L. Gary Knight, former state representative (2006-2014)
- Ricky Long, former state representative (2010-2016)
- Tom Martin, state representative and former state senator (2010-2012)
- Garrett Mason, former state senator (2010-2018) and state Senate majority leader
- Rick Mason, state representative (co-endorsed with Eric Brakey)
- Michael McClellan, former state representative (2010-2016)
- Susan Morissette, former state representative (2010-2012)
- Joshua Morris, state representative (co-endorsed with Eric Brakey)
- Allen Nadeau, former state representative (2012-2014)
- Melvin Newendyke, former state representative (2010-2014)
- John Picchiotti, former state representative (2010-2012, 2014-2018)
- Richard Pickett, state representative
- Jeffrey Pierce, former state representative (2014-2018)
- Debra Plowman, acting Education Commissioner (2016), Republican candidate in 2012 U.S. Senate race, and former state senator (2004-2012) and state Senate assistant majority leader and state representative (1992-2000)
- Gary Plummer, former state senator (2012-2014) and state representative (2004-2012)
- Matthew Pouliot, state senator and former state representative (2014-2018)
- Kerri Prescott, former state representative (2006-2012)
- Deborah Sanderson, state representative
- Jeff Timberlake, state senator and former state representative (2010-2018)
- Michael Timmons, former state representative (2014-2016)
- William Tuell, state representative
- Charlie Webster, former Maine Republican Party chair (2008-2012), 1994 Republican gubernatorial candidate, and former state senator (1984-1994), state Senate minority leader (1988-1992), state Senate assistant minority leader (1986-1988), and state representative (1980-1984)
- Stephen Wood, former state representative (2010-2018)
- David Woodsome, state senator

Newspapers

- Bangor Daily News

Organizations

- Family Research Council (FRC) Action
- National Federation of Independent Business

Individuals

- Shawn Moody, businessman, 2018 Republican gubernatorial nominee, and 2010 independent gubernatorial candidate
Declined to endorse
- Susan Collins, U.S. senator from Maine

==== Polling ====
| Poll source | Date(s) administered | Sample size | Margin of error | Adrienne Bennett | Eric Brakey | Dale Crafts | Undecided |
|---|---|---|---|---|---|---|---|
| SurveyUSA | June 30 – July 6, 2020 | 604 (LV) | ± 4.1% | 25% (Note: Standard IV response) | 19% | 37% | 19% |
| SurveyUSA | June 30 – July 6, 2020 | 604 (LV) | ± 4.1% | 31% (Note: With ranked choice voting) | – | 45% | 34% |
| We Ask America | June 16–17, 2020 | 400 (LV) | ± 4.9% | 28% | 22% | 20% | 29% |

==== Debate ====
2020 Maine's 2nd congressional district republican primary debate
| No. | Date | Host | Moderator | Link | Republican | Republican | Republican |
| Key: P Participant A Absent N Not invited I Invited W Withdrawn | | | | | | | |
| Key: P Participant A Absent N Not invited I Invited W Withdrawn | | | | | Adrienne Bennett | Eric Brakey | Dale Crafts |
|---|---|---|---|---|---|---|---|
| 1 | Jul. 9, 2020 | Maine Public Television | Jennifer Rooks | | P | P | P |

==== Primary results ====
Both Bennett and Brakey conceded the race to Crafts the day after the primary. As Crafts did not get 50% of the vote, Maine's ranked choice system calls for the second choices of the last place candidate's votes to be distributed to the other candidates, whether or not the candidates concede the race. Crafts criticized this as a waste of taxpayer dollars, and both Bennett and Brakey said they would refuse to accept the results of the ranked choice tabulation. Maine Secretary of State Matthew Dunlap said whether the concessions could stop the tabulation was "a question for lawyers", but that the tabulation would begin on July 18. Crafts called on the Maine Legislature to examine this issue. Dunlap's office, while not responding directly to Crafts' call to action on the Legislature, did agree with Crafts that Dunlap was performing his duty under the law.

Republican primary results
| Party | Candidate | Round 1 | | | Round 2 | | |
| Party | Candidate | Votes | % | Transfer | Votes | % (gross) | % (net) |
|---|---|---|---|---|---|---|---|
| Republican | Dale Crafts | 23,665 | 45.0% | +3,551 | 28,019 | 53.3% | 58.0% |
| Republican | Adrienne Bennett | 16,920 | 32.2% | +3,375 | 20,295 | 38.6% | 42.0% |
| Republican | Eric Brakey | 11,976 | 22.8% | -11,976 | Eliminated | | |
| Total active votes | | 52,561 | | | 48,314 | | 100.0% |
| Exhausted ballots | | | | +3,252 | 4190 | 8.0% | |
| Total votes | | 52,561 | 100.0% | | 52,561 | 100.0% | |

% (gross) = percent of all valid votes cast (without eliminating the exhausted votes)
% (net) = percent of votes cast after eliminating the exhausted votes

=== General election ===
==== Debate ====
2020 Maine's 1st congressional district debate
| No. | Date | Host | Moderator | Link | Democratic | Republican |
| Key: P Participant A Absent N Not invited I Invited W Withdrawn | | | | | | |
| Key: P Participant A Absent N Not invited I Invited W Withdrawn | | | | | Jared Golden | Dale Crafts |
|---|---|---|---|---|---|---|
| 1 | Oct. 25, 2020 | Maine Public Television | Jennifer Rooks | | P | P |

==== Predictions ====
| Source | Ranking | As of |
|---|---|---|
| The Cook Political Report | Likely D | October 2, 2020 |
| Inside Elections | Safe D | October 16, 2020 |
| Sabato's Crystal Ball | Likely D | October 1, 2020 |
| Politico | Lean D | October 11, 2020 |
| Daily Kos | Likely D | October 29, 2020 |
| RCP | Lean D | June 9, 2020 |
| Niskanen | Lean D | July 26, 2020 |

==== Polling ====
| Poll source | Date(s) administered | Sample size | Margin of error | Jared Golden (D) | Dale Crafts (R) | Other/ Undecided |
|---|---|---|---|---|---|---|
| Change Research | October 29 – November 2, 2020 | 475 (LV) | ± 4.6% | 53% | 44% | 3% (Note: Would not vote with 1%; "Don't recall and Did not vote with 0%; Undecided with 2%) |
| Colby College | October 21–25, 2020 | 453 (LV) | – | 56% | 31% | 13% (Note: Undecided with 13%) |
| Pan Atlantic Research | October 2–6, 2020 | 300 (LV) | ± 6.4% | 60% | 33% | 7% (Note: Undecided with 7%) |
| Critical Insights | September 25 – October 4, 2020 | 234 (LV) | – | 52% | 34% | 14% (Note: "Someone else" with 2%; "Refused" with 1%; would not vote with 0%; Undecided with 11%) |
| Colby College | September 17–23, 2020 | 275 (LV) | – | 56% | 33% | 11% |
| Siena College/NYT Upshot | September 11–16, 2020 | 440 (LV) | – | 56% (Note: Topline after Ranked Choice Voting is used) | 37% | 6% (Note: "Someone else" and would not vote with 0%; "Undecided/Refused" with 6%) |
| Fabrizio Ward/Hart Research Associates (Note: Poll sponsored by AARP.) | August 30 – September 5, 2020 | 367 (LV) | – | 53% | 40% | 7% (Note: Would not vote with 0%; Undecided with 7%) |
| Wick Surveys (D) (Note: Poll sponsored by Left of Center PAC, which has endorsed Golden prior to this poll's sampling period.) | August 25–28, 2020 | 400 (LV) | ± 4.9% | 50% | 44% | 6% (Note: Undecided with 6%) |
| Critical Insights | July 28 – August 10, 2020 | 218 (LV) | – | 46% | 36% | 18% (Note: "Someone else" with 1%; would not vote with 0%; "Prefer not to say" with no voters; Undecided with 16%) |
| Colby College/SocialSphere | July 18–24, 2020 | 888 (LV) | ± 3.9% | 45% | 33% | 22% (Note: "One of the minor party candidates" with 5%; Undecided with 17%) |

Hypothetical polling

Jared Golden vs. generic Republican

| Poll source | Date(s) administered | Sample size | Margin of error | Jared Golden (D) | Generic Republican | Undecided |
|---|---|---|---|---|---|---|
| Colby College/SocialSphere | February 10–13, 2020 | 493 (LV) | – | 43% | 29% | 28% |

==== Results ====
Maine's 2nd Congressional District, 2020
| Party | Candidate | Votes | % | ±% |
|---|---|---|---|---|
| Democratic | Jared F. Golden (incumbent) | 197,974 | 53.04% | +2.42% |
| Republican | Dale John Crafts | 175,228 | 46.95% | −2.43% |
| Write-in | | 33 | 0.01% | N/A |
| Majority | | 22,746 | 6.09% | +4.85% |
| Total votes | | 373,235 | 100.00% | N/A |
| Democratic hold | | | | |

== See also ==
- 2020 Maine elections

== Notes ==
Partisan clients
