= Maine's 4th State Senate district =

American legislative district

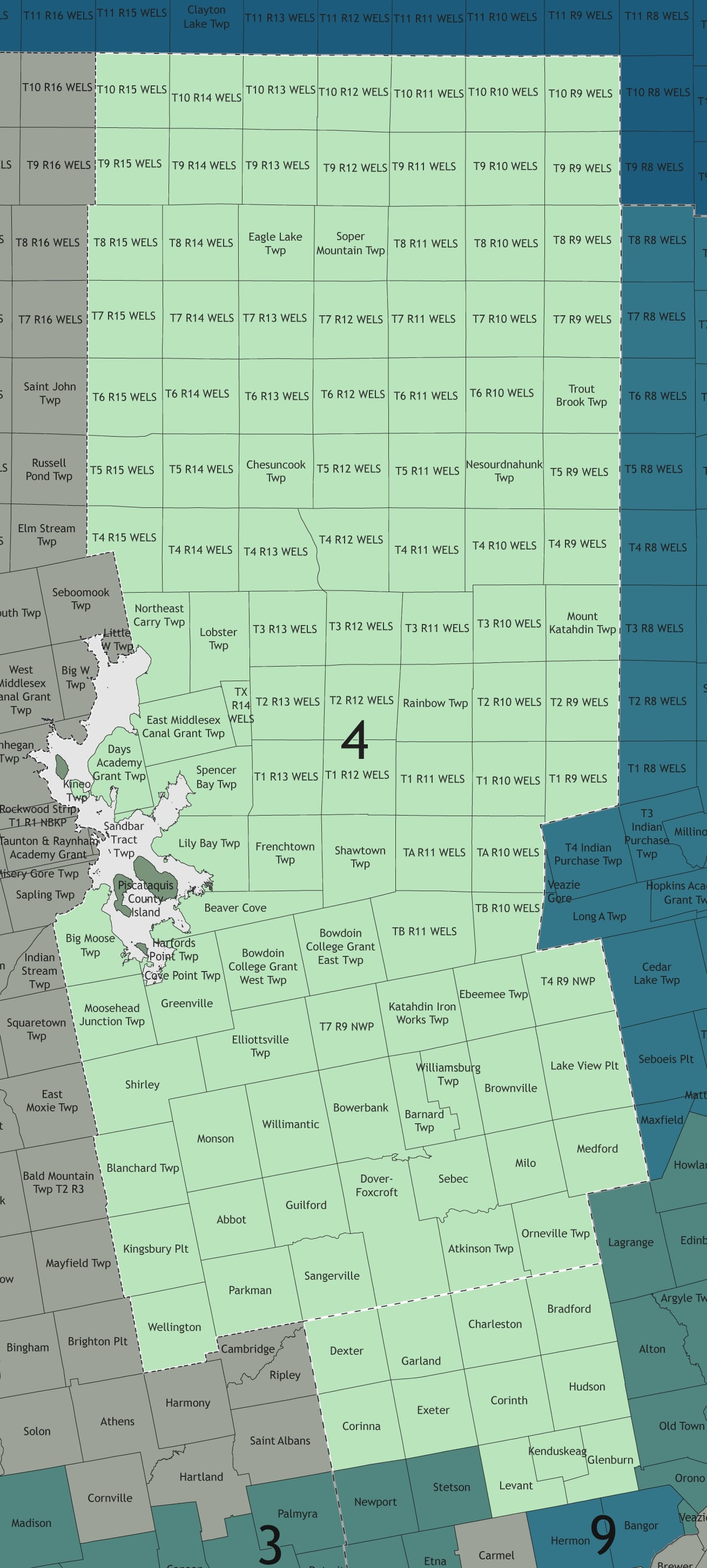
Senator
Stacey Guerin; R–Penobscot
- Registration: 38.9% Republican; 18.8% Democratic; 42.3% No party preference
- Population (2020): 40,500

Maine's 4th State Senate district is one of 35 districts in the Maine Senate. It has been represented by Republican Stacey Guerin since 2022.

== Geography ==
District 4 includes a small part of Penobscot County, and the entirety of Piscataquis County.

Penobscot County - 15.8% of county

Piscataquis County - 100% of county

Penobscot:

Towns:

- Bradford
- Charleston
- Corinth
- Corinna
- Dexter
- Exeter
- Garland
- Glenburg
- Hudson
- Kenduskeag
- Levant

Piscataquis:

== Recent election results ==
=== 2022 ===
2022 Maine State Senate election, District 4
Party	Candidate	Votes	%
Republican	Stacey Guerin	13,321	70.1
Democratic	Andrea Thurlow	5,679	29.9
Total votes		19,000	100.0
Republican hold			

Elections prior to 2022 were held under different district lines.

=== 2024 ===
2024 Maine State Senate election, District 4
Party	Candidate	Votes	%
Republican	Stacey Guerin	15,741	67.4
Democratic	Richard A. Evans	7,624	32.6
Total votes		23,365	100.0
Republican hold			

== Historical election results ==
=== 2012 ===
2012 Maine State Senate election, District 4
Party	Candidate	Votes	%
Democratic	David Dutremble	10,062	53.5
Independent	James Booth	8,749	46.5
Total votes		18,881	100

=== 2014 ===
2014 Maine State Senate election, District 4
Party	Candidate	Votes	%
Republican	Paul Davis	11,615	71.5
Democratic	David Ziemer	3,804	23.4
Blank votes	None	824	5.1
Total votes		16,243	100
Republican gain from Democratic			

=== 2016 ===
2016 Maine State Senate election, District 4
Party	Candidate	Votes	%
Republican	Paul T. Davis	13,525	72.5
Democratic	Carole Boothroyd	5,137	27.5
Total votes		18,662	100
Republican hold			

=== 2018 ===
2018 Maine State Senate election, District 4
Party	Candidate	Votes	%
Republican	Paul T. Davis	9,895	65.9
Democratic	Susan Mackey Andrews	5,112	34.1
Total votes		15,007	100
Republican hold			

=== 2020 ===
2020 Maine State Senate election, District 4
Party	Candidate	Votes	%
Republican	Paul T. Davis	14,817	76.2
Democratic	David Ziemer	4,629	23.8
Total votes		19,446	100
Republican hold			
