= Maine's 10th State Senate district =

American legislative district

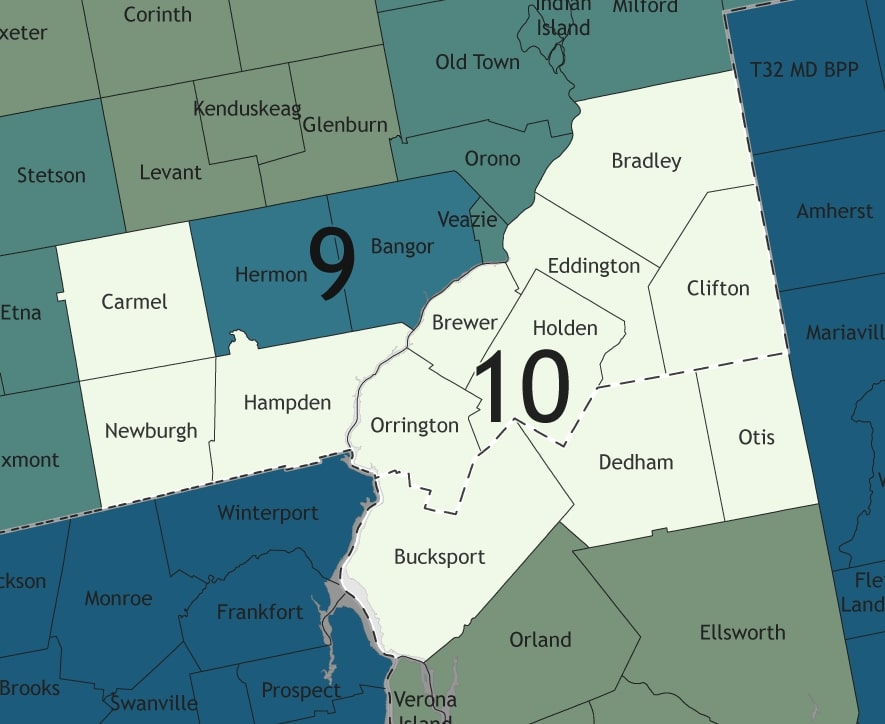
Senator
David Haggan; R–Hampden
- Registration: 34% Republican; 25.7% Democratic; 40.3% No party preference
- Population (2020): 41,469

Maine's 10th State Senate district is one of 35 districts in the Maine Senate. It has been represented by Republican David Haggan since 2024.

== Geography ==
District 10 is made up of small parts of the counties of Hancock and Penobscot.

Hancock County - 13.1% of county

Penobscot County - 22% of county

Hancock:

Towns:

- Bucksport
- Dedham
- Otis

Penobscot:

City:

- Brewer

Towns:

- Bradley
- Carmel
- Clifton
- Eddington
- Hampden
- Holden
- Newburgh
- Orrington

== Recent election results ==
=== 2022 ===
2022 Maine State Senate election, District 10
Party	Candidate	Votes	%
Republican	Peter Lyford	11,522	56.1
Democratic	Ralph Cammack	9,011	43.9
Total votes		20,533	100.0
Republican hold			

Elections prior to 2022 were held under different district lines.

=== 2024 ===
2024 Maine State Senate election, District 10
Party	Candidate	Votes	%
Republican	David Haggan	14,095	56.9
Democratic	Michele LaBree Daniels	10,676	43.1
Total votes		25,771	100.0
Republican hold			

== Historical election results ==
=== 2012 ===
2012 Maine State Senate election, District 10
Party	Candidate	Votes	%
Democratic	Stanley Gerzofsky	13,636	67.5
Republican	Ralph Dean	6,573	32.5
Total votes		20,209	100
Democratic hold			

=== 2014 ===
2014 Maine State Senate election, District 10
Party	Candidate	Votes	%
Republican	Andre Cushing	10,434	64.6
Democratic	Jarric Fontaine	4,597	28.5
Blank votes	None	1,126	7
Total votes		16,157	100
Republican gain from Democratic			

=== 2016 ===
2016 Maine State Senate election, District 10
Party	Candidate	Votes	%
Republican	Andre Cushing	11,305	57.2
Independent	Dennis Marble	8,445	42.8
Total votes		19,750	100
Republican hold			

=== 2018 ===
2018 Maine State Senate election, District 10
Party	Candidate	Votes	%
Republican	Stacey Guerin	10,431	66.2
Democratic	William Lippincott	5,338	33.8
Total votes		15,767	100
Republican hold			

=== 2020 ===
2020 Maine State Senate election, District 10
Party	Candidate	Votes	%
Republican	Stacey Guerin	14,508	69.8
Democratic	Frederick Austin	6,278	30.2
Total votes		20,786	100
Republican hold			
