= Mike Perkins (politician) =

American politician from Maine

Michael Perkins

Member of the Maine House of Representatives from the 77th district
- Incumbent
- Assumed office 2016

Personal details
- Party: Republican
- Spouse: Kelly
- Children: 2

Michael Perkins is an American politician from Maine. A Republican, Perkins has represented the 77th district in the Maine House of Representatives since 2016. He has worked as a police officer and small business owner. In June 2021, Perkins declared his candidacy for the 2022 election in Maine's 2nd congressional district. He dropped out of the race in December 2021, citing a recent battle with COVID-19.
