= Electoral reform in Maine =

U.S. state electoral reform

Electoral reform in Maine is the effort to change voting and election laws in the Pine Tree State. Electoral reform measures related to voting systems and voter eligibility have been proposed, and in some cases, passed.

In 2004, several Maine legislators proposed a bill to lower the voting age to 17. The proposal failed, but a compromise to allow 17-year-olds to vote in primary election if 18 by general election passed. In 2007, legislation was introduced to join the National Popular Vote Interstate Compact, but it failed. Currently, Maine is the only state besides Nebraska to allocate two of its electors to the winner of the statewide popular vote and the rest according to the winner of the popular vote in each Congressional district.

A bill passed in August 2019 will make Maine the first state to use ranked-choice voting in presidential general elections in 2020, but use in presidential primaries has been delayed until 2024.
