= John Patrick (Maine politician) =

American politician and mechanic

Member of the Maine Senate from the 14th district
- In office 2010 – December 2016
- Preceded by: Bruce Bryant
- Succeeded by: Lisa Keim

Personal details
- Born: March 25, 1954 (age 72) Rumford, Maine
- Party: Democratic
- Spouse: Claire Patrick
- Profession: Mechanic

John L. Patrick (born March 25, 1954) is an American politician and mechanic who served as a member of the Maine Senate from 2010 to 2016.

== Career ==
A resident of Rumford, Patrick graduated from nearby Mexico High School in 1972 and worked in the NewPage Paper Mill in Rumford for 29 years. While working as a journeyman mechanic the mill, Patrick eventually became president of the United Paperworkers Union Local 900. He also served on the board of directors of the Maine AFL-CIO.

He was first elected to the Maine House of Representatives in 2000. He served in the house until he was unable to run again due to term-limits. He instead ran for the seat vacated by Sen. Bruce Bryant. He won both his 2010 Senate campaign with 68% of the vote. In January 2012 he announced he would seek a second term.
