= Eric Brakey =

American politician (born 1988)

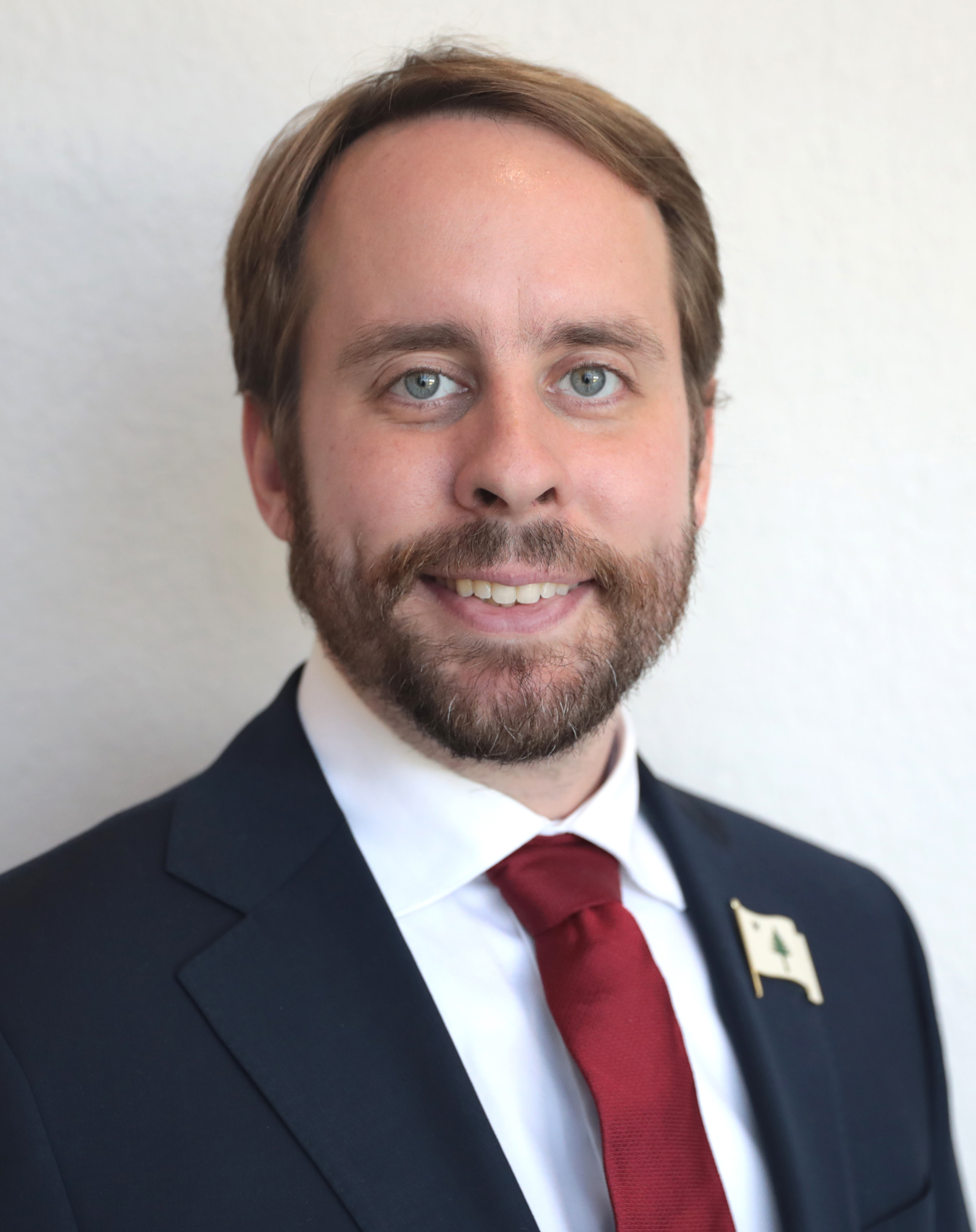
- Brakey in 2022

Member of the Maine Senate from the 20th district
- In office December 7, 2022 – November 5, 2024
- Preceded by: Ned Claxton
- Succeeded by: Bruce Bickford
- In office December 3, 2014 – December 5, 2018
- Preceded by: John Cleveland
- Succeeded by: Ned Claxton

Personal details
- Born: August 8, 1988 (age 38) Cleveland, Ohio, U.S.
- Party: Republican
- Education: Ohio University (BFA)

Eric Brakey (born August 8, 1988) is an American politician and the executive director of the Free State Project. A libertarian member of the Republican Party, he served as a Maine state senator from 2014 to 2018, and again from 2022 to 2024.

Brakey was born in Cleveland, Ohio and grew up in the greater suburb of Shaker Heights, Ohio before attending Ohio University, where he studied theater performance. After college, he moved to New York City and worked as a professional actor. A supporter of Congressman Ron Paul, Brakey took a job on his 2012 presidential campaign and moved to Maine.

Brakey was elected to the state senate for district 20 in 2014. This district includes Auburn, New Gloucester, Poland, Minot, and Mechanic Falls. He was re-elected in 2016. Brakey served as chairman of the Senate Health and Human Services Committee.

Brakey was Maine state director for the 2012 Ron Paul presidential campaign; he led Ron Paul's supporters to win a majority of Maine delegate seats to the 2012 Republican National Convention, and won key seats on the Maine Republican state committee and national committee. After working for Paul's 2012 presidential campaign, Brakey led Defense of Liberty PAC, a libertarian political action committee in Maine.

Brakey was the Republican nominee for U.S. Senate in 2018, losing to incumbent Senator Angus King with 35% of the vote in a three-way race. In 2020, Brakey sought the Republican nomination for Maine's 2nd congressional district, but placed third in the Republican primary election behind state representative Dale Crafts and Adrienne Bennett. Later that year, he was selected as the Republican candidate for Secretary of State of Maine.

In 2022, Brakey won a third term in the Maine State Senate after four years out of office. He defeated former Maine State Representative Bettyann Sheats. He resigned in November 2024 in order to move to New Hampshire.

== Ron Paul 2012 presidential campaign ==
Brakey served as the Maine state director for the 2012 Ron Paul presidential campaign during the events of the 2012 Maine Republican Convention, in which Ron Paul supporters elected a majority of Maine delegates to the Republican National Convention, and took over many key positions in the Maine Republican Party. Bill Nemitz of the Portland Press Herald called this event "the most successful political coup in recent Maine history."

=== Defense of Liberty PAC ===
In June 2012, Brakey founded the Defense of Liberty PAC, a libertarian political action committee in Maine. In 2013, the group assigned grades to lawmakers based on their votes on bills they supported (such as legislation to make it legal for Maine residents to carry concealed firearms without a permit) and on bills they opposed (such as legislation to increase the minimum wage). The group designated 10 Republican legislators as "Honor Roll" members for positions aligned with the group, and deemed 21 Democratic legislators and independent Representative Joseph E. Brooks "constitutional threats" for positions opposed to the group.

== 2014 Maine State Senate campaign ==
Brakey announced his campaign for Maine state senate in July 2013. His campaign chairman was former State Senator Lois Snowe-Mello. In January 2014, Brakey visited Bitcoin center NYC to raise money and became "the first candidate in his state to accept campaign donations in bitcoins."

=== Vita CoCo commercial ===
In August 2013, during his campaign for the state senate, Brakey gained attention for a commercial he acted in for Vita CoCo coconut water several years earlier. The commercial featured men dancing in Brazilian bathing suits.

Attention to this commercial began when Mike Hein (a former employee of the Maine Christian Civic League) sent video of the commercial to major news outlets in Maine, as well as to Eric Brakey's pastors at East Auburn Baptist Church. In his message, Hein describes Brakey as "dancing around in his underwear in his bedroom, as though he were demon-possessed." Brakey responded, "That's my background, and I'm still doing a lot of acting. I'm an actor, and when I was working professionally in New York City this was a real fun, wonderful opportunity doing a commercial for a national brand." At the time of the controversy, Brakey noted that he was working as an actor with the Lewiston/Auburn Community Little Theatre in an upcoming production of Monty Python's Spamalot, also a comedic piece. Maine political commentator Matthew Gagnon wrote that the incident boosted Brakey's State Senate campaign by providing "free publicity" and "an opportunity to show his personality and good nature to the voters."

== State senate tenure (2014–2018) ==
The American Conservative Union ranked Brakey's voting record as the most conservative in the Maine Senate in 2015 2016, and 2017.

In 2015, Brakey sponsored legislation that eliminated Maine's requirement to obtain a permit to carry a concealed firearm "for legal gun owners who are age 21 or older, and for all military servicemen or servicewomen over 18 years old." The legislation won broad bipartisan support in the House and Senate and was signed into law by Governor Paul LePage. The legislation was supported by the National Rifle Association and the Maine State Police, and opposed by Everytown for Gun Safety, the Maine Chiefs of Police Association, and the Maine Sheriffs' Association.

In 2016, as senate chairman for the Health and Human Services Committee, Brakey negotiated welfare reform legislation, which banned the use of Temporary Assistance for Needy Families (TANF) funds on purchases of tobacco, liquor, gambling materials, lottery tickets, bail, firearms, vacations, adult entertainment, and tattoos. To enforce this prohibition, penalties for making prohibited welfare purchases include required restitution for intentional violations and suspensions of benefits ranging up to three months on the first offense and up to 24 months of suspended benefits on third and subsequent offenses.

Brakey, as chair for the Health and Human Services Committee, was the lead senate sponsor of state "right to try" legislation in 2016, which guarantees terminally ill patients the right to use investigational drugs, treatments, and medical devices that have not yet been approved by the Food and Drug Administration. The legislation passed the Maine House and Senate and Governor Paul LePage signed the legislation into law on March 30, 2016, making Maine the 25th state in the nation (and the first in New England) to pass right-to-try legislation.

Brakey was the sole "no" vote in the senate against the creation of the Maine Capital Investment Fund; in floor speeches, he opposed the fund, which directed public funds for a loan program to incentivize large, out-of-state businesses to relocate to Maine.

Brakey has sponsored legislation to eliminate Maine's business income tax, while also eliminating 47 state tax credits or exemptions enjoyed by a number of industries. Brakey referred to these credits and exemptions as "carve-outs" and "corporate welfare"; the measure was opposed by the Maine State Chamber of Commerce.

In 2015, Brakey sponsored legislation to repeal state restrictions on patient access to medical marijuana in hospital and nursing home settings. Brakey also supports the legalization of marijuana for adult use. He supported the Maine Marijuana Legalization (Question 1), a ballot question on the Maine 2016 ballot that legalized adult use marijuana in the state.

Brakey has opposed Medicaid expansion in the Maine senate, questioning the future "solvency of the federal government."

In 2017, Brakey sponsored legislation to increase access to birth control by making it easier for persons with "an outdated birth-control prescription to get the medication as long as certain conditions are met."

He "declined to say whether he would support allowing women who may become eligible under any expansion of Medicaid in Maine to have access to reproductive health services including abortions." This issue has been a contentious one among Maine state legislators, dividing conservative Republicans and Democrats.

Brakey is an opponent of civil asset forfeiture, saying, "The idea that the government can take property from you without trial or due process of law and that you might never be charged or convicted flies in the face of everything this country stands for." He introduced legislation that would have required the owner of a property to be convicted of a crime before the government can forfeit that property; the bill did not pass.

In 2015, Brakey introduced legislation to eliminate cash bail in Maine and replace it with a risk-assessment system that would allow defendants not determined to be a flight risk to be released pending trial. Brakey said that such a policy would save taxpayer funds and protect the civil liberties of defendants; Brakey noted, "about 69 percent of the inmates in Maine jails are those who have yet to go to trial and are unable to post bail."

Brakey has also sponsored legislation to allow the expungement of certain nonviolent criminal records five years after the completion of the sentence, citing legislation signed into law by Kentucky Governor Matt Bevin as his model.

Brakey initially declined to say for who he voted in the 2016 presidential election, saying only that he did not vote for Hillary Clinton. In April 2018, however, Brakey tweeted saying he "proudly voted for Donald Trump and the foreign policy he advocated."

== 2016 Republican national platform ==
At the 2016 Republican National Convention in Cleveland, Ohio, Brakey represented Maine on the National Platform Committee. Brakey sponsored several amendments to the platform that were successfully adopted, including a measure that declared support for "Right To Try" legislation, which would allow terminally ill patients to try investigational medicines not approved by the FDA, as well as measures supporting an audit of the Pentagon, the abolishment of the IRS and development of thorium nuclear power. Brakey also sponsored several amendments that were voted down, including a measure that would have declared support for medical marijuana, and another measure that would have condemned U.S. military intervention in Libya and called the "deposing of secular dictators in the Middle East" a "failed policy" that should be ended.

== 2018 U.S. Senate campaign ==
In April 2017, Brakey announced his intention to run for U.S. Senate in 2018 against incumbent independent Senator Angus King, who caucuses with the Democrats in the Senate. During the campaign, Brakey sought to appeal to both Trump supporters and to libertarians. King was favored throughout the race, and defeated Brakey by a wide margin in the November election. King received 344,575 votes (54%); Brakey received 223,502 votes (35%), and Democratic nominee Zak Ringelstein received 66,268 votes (10%).

== 2020 U.S. House campaign ==
In September 2019, Brakey announced his candidacy for Maine's second district of the United States House of Representatives against incumbent Democrat Jared Golden. Brakey earned early endorsements from several Republicans in Maine's state legislature as well as endorsements from conservative organizations such as Club for Growth and FreedomWorks. He finished with the fewest votes of the 3 Republican primary candidates.

== Free State Project Executive Director ==
In late 2023, the Free State Project, a migration project to get 20,000 or more libertarians to move to the U.S. state of New Hampshire in order to concentrate the efforts of libertarian activists in one area, tapped Eric Brakey to be their latest Executive Director.

Brakey said that he would finish out his term in the state senate in Maine prior to moving to New Hampshire and working full-time as the newest Executive Director of the FSP in New Hampshire.

Party political offices
| Preceded by Charlie Summers | Republican nominee for U.S. Senator from Maine (Class 1); 2018 | Succeeded by Demitroula Kouzounas |
