= 2020 Maine elections =

A general election was held in the U.S. state of Maine on November 3, 2020. The office of the Maine Secretary of State oversaw the election process, including voting and vote counting.

To vote by mail, registered Maine voters must have requested a ballot by October 29, 2020. As of early October some 339,930 voters had requested mail ballots. Each mailed ballot was counted if it had arrived at the relevant clerk's office by 8pm on November 3.

== State offices ==
=== Maine Senate ===
All 35 seats of the Maine Senate were up for election. The Democratic Party won 22 seats and the Republican Party won 13 seats. Democrats gained Districts 13 and 34 while Republicans gained District 2.

=== Maine House of Representatives ===
All 151 seats in the Maine House of Representatives were up for election. The Democrats won 79 seats, Republicans won 66 seats, and independents won 5 seats.

== Federal offices ==
=== President and vice president of the United States ===
Maine had 4 electoral votes in the Electoral College. Democrat Joe Biden won 3 electoral votes, the 2 statewide and the 1st congressional district, while Republican Donald Trump won 1 electoral vote from the 2nd congressional district

=== United States Senate ===
One of Maine's two United States Senators was up for election. Incumbent Republican Susan Collins won with 51% of the votes.

=== United States House of Representatives ===
Both of Maine's seats in the United States House of Representatives were up for election. 2 Democrats were elected. No seats changed hands.

== See also ==
- Electoral reform in Maine
- Elections in Maine
- Political party strength in Maine
- Politics of Maine
