= Peter Lyford =

American politician

Member of the Maine Senate from the 10th district
- In office December 7, 2022 – December 4, 2024
- Preceded by: Stacey Guerin
- Succeeded by: David Haggan

Member of the Maine House of Representatives from the 129th district
- In office December 3, 2014 – December 7, 2022
- Preceded by: Andrew McLean
- Succeeded by: Margaret O'Neil

Personal details
- Born: Brewer, Maine
- Party: Republican
- Spouse: Marcia
- Children: 2
- Education: Husson College

Peter A. Lyford is an American politician. He is a Republican representing District 10 in the Maine Senate.

== Political career ==
In 2014, Lyford ran for election to represent District 129 in the Maine House of Representatives, and defeated Democrat Teresa Montague to win. He has been re-elected three times.

=== Electoral record ===
2014 general election: Maine House of Representatives, District 129
Party	Candidate	Votes	%
Republican	Peter Lyford	2,827	63.7%
Democratic	Teresa Montague	1,395	31.5%
	Blank Votes	213	4.8%

2016 general election: Maine House of Representatives, District 129
Party	Candidate	Votes	%
Republican	Peter Lyford	3,239	62.20%
Democratic	Teresa Montague	1,968	37.80%
