= Stacey Guerin =

American politician

Stacey K. Guerin

Member of the Maine Senate
- Incumbent
- Assumed office December 7, 2022
- Preceded by: Paul T. Davis
- Constituency: 4th district
- In office December 5, 2018 – December 7, 2022
- Succeeded by: Peter Lyford
- Constituency: 10th district

Member of the Maine House of Representatives for the 102nd District
- In office December 2010 – December 5, 2018
- Preceded by: Christian D. Greeley
- Succeeded by: Abigail Griffin

Personal details
- Party: Republican
- Education: University of Maine
- Profession: Teacher

Stacey K. Guerin is an American politician from Maine. Guerin, a Republican, represents a portion of Penobscot County, Maine, including her residence in Glenburn, Maine, in the Maine Senate. She previously was elected to four terms to Maine House of Representatives. She was first elected in 2010. Guerin is a former schoolteacher and holds a degree in Elementary Education from the University of Maine.

== House ==
Guerin ran unopposed for her first term in office in 2010. Facing re-election in 2012, only unenrolled former tribal legislator David Slagger opposed Guerin. Guerin won with 78% of the vote. In 2014, no other candidate again filed to run against Guerin, guaranteeing her re-election. Guerin has served a member of the Inland Fisheries and Wildlife Committee as well as on the Judiciary Committee during her time in the Legislature.

== Senate ==
Guerin was first elected to the Maine Senate in 2018 and re-elected in 2020. District 10 includes the towns of Carmel, Corinna, Corinth, Dixmont, Etna, Exeter, Glenburn, Hampden, Hudson, Kenduskeag, Levant, Newburgh, Newport, Plymouth, and Stetson. During her first term, she served on the Labor and Housing Committee. In May 2020, in the midst of the COVID-19 pandemic, she called for freezing the minimum wage.

Maine House of Representatives
Preceded by Chris Greeley	Member of the Maine House of Representatives from the 22nd district 2010–2014	Succeeded by Jonathan Lee Kinney
Preceded by Michael Shaw	Member of the Maine House of Representatives from the 102nd district 2014–2018	Succeeded by Abigail Griffin
Maine Senate
Preceded by Andre Cushing III	Member of the Maine Senate from the 10th district 2018–2022	Succeeded by Peter Lyford
Preceded by Paul Davis	Member of the Maine Senate from the 4th district 2022–present	Incumbent
