= Ned Claxton =

American politician

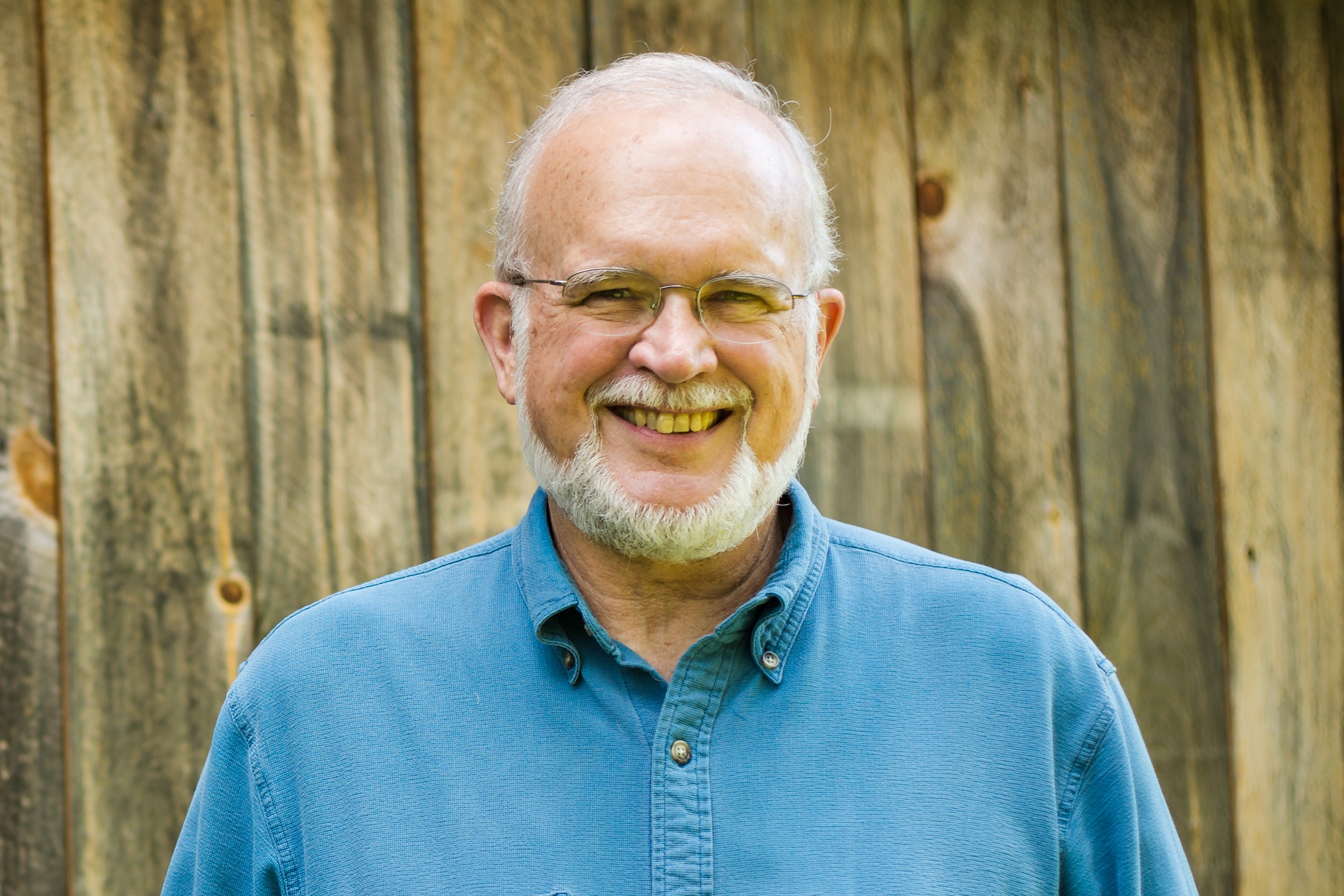

Member of the Maine Senate from the 20th district
- In office December 5, 2018 – December 7, 2022
- Preceded by: Eric Brakey
- Succeeded by: Eric Brakey

Personal details
- Born: March 16, 1949 (age 77) Massachusetts
- Party: Democratic
- Spouse: Marian "Kitzie" Eckert
- Children: 2
- Education: Princeton University (BA); University of Cincinnati (MD)
- Occupation: Physician (retired)
- Profession: Medicine
- Website: https://nedclaxton.mainecandidate.com/

Edmund Claxton Jr. is an American physician and Democratic politician from Maine. He served in the Maine Senate representing District 20, which includes Auburn, Mechanic Falls, Minot, New Gloucester, and Poland, from 2018-2022. Claxton was born in Massachusetts and attended Princeton University, the University of Cincinnati College of Medicine, and the University of Minnesota where he completed his family medicine residency. He then moved to Maine and co-founded a private practice in Auburn where he worked for several decades. Claxton was first elected to the Maine Senate in 2018 and was re-elected in 2020 for a second two-year term.

== Early life and education ==
Claxton was born in Massachusetts and attended Princeton University, graduating in 1971. He received his M.D. from the University of Cincinnati College of Medicine in 1975 and completed his residency in family medicine at the University of Minnesota in 1978.

== Career ==
=== Physician ===
Following residency, Claxton moved to Maine and co-founded Family Healthcare Associates, a family medicine practice, with his colleague and friend Peter Elias in 1978. He practiced for almost forty years before retiring.

In 1987, Claxton was named the first Maine Family Physician of the Year by the Maine Academy of Family Physicians. He served on the board of the Maine Public Health Association and was the director of the family medicine residency program at Central Maine Medical Center. Claxton has also medically supported large Maine community fundraisers including the Dempsey Challenge and the Beach to Beacon 10K. .

=== Maine Senate ===
Claxton announced his candidacy for Maine Senate District 20 in January 2018. He and his opponent, Republican Ellie Espling, sought to fill the seat vacated when incumbent Eric Brakey decided to run for United States Senate. Claxton ran unopposed in the Democratic primary and narrowly defeated Espling 50%-49%.

In 2020, Claxton ran for re-election as a Clean Elections candidate against Republican challenger Matthew Leonard. Claxton was again unopposed in the Democratic primary and defeated Leonard 53%-47%.

== Personal life ==
Claxton lives in Auburn with his wife Marian "Kitsie" Claxton, a former hospice chaplain. The Claxtons have two adult sons.

Claxton is involved with several community organizations in the Auburn area, including the Stanton Bird Club, the Androscoggin Land Trust, the Trinity Jubilee Center, the Hanley Center for Healthcare Leadership, the Maine Appalachian Trail Club, and the White Mountain National Forest. He was a Central Maine Medical Center trustee from 1983 to 1992, served on the board of the Maine Public Health Association from 2008 to 2014, was a trustee of the Maine College of Health Professions for 9 years, and co-chaired the Lewiston/Auburn Public Health Steering Committee for 2 years.

Claxton is a member of the First Universalist Church in Auburn where he serves on the Endowment committee and sings in the choir. In his spare time, he enjoys outdoor recreation, gardening, bird watching, volunteering, completing home improvement projects, and reading. He coaches youth soccer, basketball and baseball and is a soccer referee. In January 2024, Claxton was named president of the board of the Maine College of Health Professions.

== Electoral record ==
2018 Maine State Senate District 20 Democratic primary
| Party | Candidate | Votes | % |
|---|---|---|---|
| Democratic | Ned Claxton | 2,587 | 100.0% |
| Total votes | | 2,587 | 100.0% |

2018 Maine State Senate District 20 General Election
| Party | Candidate | Votes | % |
|---|---|---|---|
| Democratic | Ned Claxton | 8,993 | 50.7% |
| Republican | Eleanor Espling | 8,758 | 49.3% |
| Total votes | | 17,751 | 100.0% |

2020 Maine State Senate District 20 Democratic primary
| Party | Candidate | Votes | % |
|---|---|---|---|
| Democratic | Ned Claxton | 3,269 | 100.0% |
| Total votes | | 3,269 | 100.0% |

2020 Maine State Senate District 20 General Election
| Party | Candidate | Votes | % |
|---|---|---|---|
| Democratic | Ned Claxton | 11,884 | 53.4% |
| Republican | Matthew Leonard | 10,361 | 46.6% |
| Total votes | | 22,129 | 100.0% |
