= David Woodsome =

American politician from Maine

Member of the Maine House of Representatives from the 139th district
- Incumbent
- Assumed office December 7, 2022
- Preceded by: William Tuell

Member of the Maine Senate from the 33rd district
- In office December 3, 2014 – December 7, 2022
- Preceded by: John Tuttle
- Succeeded by: Matthew Harrington

Personal details
- Party: Republican
- Education: University of Maine

David Woodsome is an American politician from Maine. Woodsome, a Republican from Waterboro, Maine, was elected to the Maine Senate in November 2014.

Woodsome attended the University of Maine.
