= Matthew Pouliot =

American politician

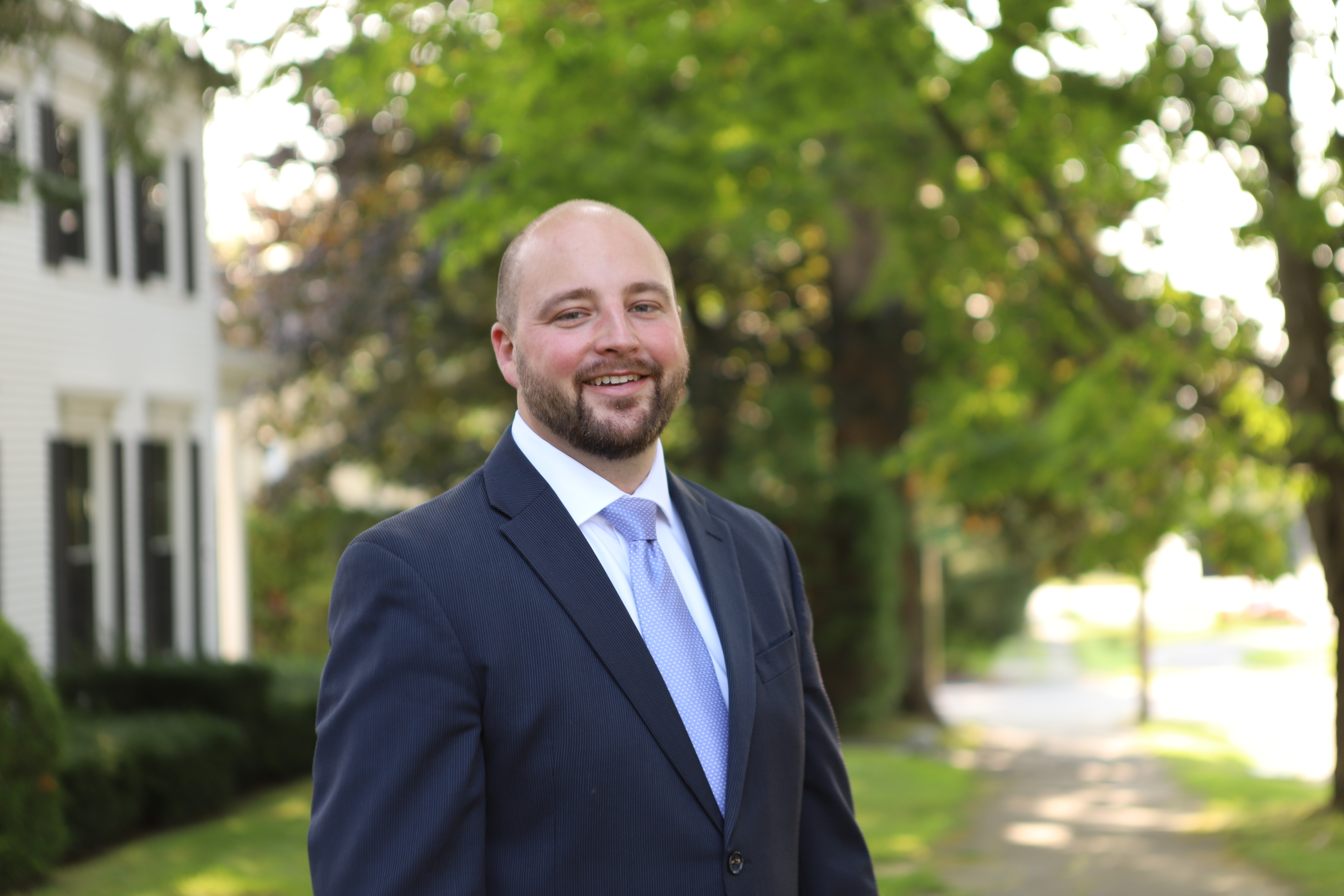

Member of the Maine Senate from the 15 district
- Incumbent
- Assumed office December 5, 2018
- Preceded by: Roger J. Katz

Member of the Maine House of Representatives from the 86th district
- In office December 3, 2014 – December 5, 2018
- Preceded by: Ann E. Dorney
- Succeeded by: Justin Fecteau

Member of the Maine House of Representatives from the 57th district
- In office December 5, 2012 – December 3, 2014
- Preceded by: Maeghan Maloney
- Succeeded by: Stephen J. Wood

Personal details
- Born: 1986 (age 39–40)
- Party: Republican
- Education: University of Maine at Augusta

Matthew Gary Pouliot (born 1986) is an American politician and realtor from Maine. A Republican from Augusta, he was a member of the Maine State Senate, representing District 15, which includes Augusta, China, Oakland, Sidney, and Vassalboro. Elected in November 2012 at the age of 25, Pouliot is one of the youngest members of the Maine Legislature. He graduated from Cony High School in Augusta, received a bachelor's degree in Business Administration from the University of Maine at Augusta, and works as a Realtor. In December 2020, he was elected by other Republicans to serve as Assistant Minority Leader.

Pouliot serves on the Legislature's Education and Cultural Affairs Committee, where he has introduced several bills, passing measures to advance financial literacy in Maine's high school curriculum and allow municipalities to prohibit sex offenders from living within 750 feet of a recreational area.

Pouliot is a native of Augusta. He serves on the Kennebec Valley Board of Realtors, the Augusta Rotary Club, the Augusta Downtown Alliance, and Junior Achievement of Maine. He is a member of the Franco-American Calumet Club. Pouliot married the former Heather Marie Veilleux on August 17, 2013.
