= Glenburn, Maine =

Glenburn, Maine Dutton
- Town
- Seal

- Location within Maine Location within the United States
- Coordinates: 44°53′31″N 68°52′20″W
- Country: United States
- State: Maine
- County: Penobscot
- Incorporated: January 29, 1822
- Renamed: March 18, 1837

Area
  - Total: 29.15 sq mi (75.50 km^{2})
  - Land: 27.19 sq mi (70.42 km^{2})
  - Water: 1.96 sq mi (5.08 km^{2})
- Elevation: 184 ft (56 m)

Population (2020)
  - Total: 4,648
  - Density: 170/sq mi (66/km^{2})
- Time zone: UTC-5 (Eastern (EST))
  - Summer (DST): UTC-4 (EDT)
- ZIP code: 04401
- Area code: 207
- FIPS code: 23-27645
- GNIS feature ID: 582491
- Website: www.glenburn.org

Glenburn is a town in Penobscot County, Maine, United States. The population was 4,648 at the 2020 census. When originally incorporated in 1822, it was called "Dutton" in honor of Bangor's Samuel Dutton, a judge and founder of the Bangor Theological Seminary. It was renamed the Town of Glenburn on March 18, 1837.

== Geography ==
According to the United States Census Bureau, the town has a total area of 29.15 square miles (75.50 km^{2}), of which 27.19 square miles (70.42 km^{2}) is land and 1.96 square miles (5.08 km^{2}) is water.

The two historic centers are the villages of Glenburn and West Glenburn. It is bordered on the north by Hudson, on the east by Old Town, on the south by Orono, on the south by Bangor, on the southwest by Hermon and on the west by Kenduskeag.

== Demographics ==
Historical population
Census	Pop.	Note	%±
1830	443		—
1840	664		49.9%
1850	905		36.3%
1860	741		−18.1%
1870	720		−2.8%
1880	655		−9.0%
1890	583		−11.0%
1900	461		−20.9%
1910	457		−0.9%
1920	377		−17.5%
1930	357		−5.3%
1940	500		40.1%
1950	694		38.8%
1960	965		39.0%
1970	1,196		23.9%
1980	2,319		93.9%
1990	3,198		37.9%
2000	3,964		24.0%
2010	4,594		15.9%
2020	4,648		1.2%
U.S. Decennial Census

=== 2010 census ===
As of the census of 2010, there were 4,594 people, 1,808 households, and 1,300 families residing in the town. The population density was 169.0 inhabitants per square mile (65.3/km^{2}). There were 2,018 housing units at an average density of 74.2 per square mile (28.6/km^{2}). The racial makeup of the town was 97.1% White, 0.4% African American, 0.7% Native American, 0.5% Asian, 0.1% from other races, and 1.1% from two or more races. Hispanic or Latino of any race were 0.4% of the population.

There were 1,808 households, of which 33.3% had children under the age of 18 living with them, 58.8% were married couples living together, 8.6% had a female householder with no husband present, 4.5% had a male householder with no wife present, and 28.1% were non-families. 18.9% of all households were made up of individuals, and 6.3% had someone living alone who was 65 years of age or older. The average household size was 2.54 and the average family size was 2.88.

The median age in the town was 41.2 years. 22.1% of residents were under the age of 18; 7.9% were between the ages of 18 and 24; 25.8% were from 25 to 44; 33.6% were from 45 to 64; and 10.5% were 65 years of age or older. The gender makeup of the town was 49.4% male and 50.6% female.

== Education ==
Students in Glenburn attend Glenburn School (K–8). The town has no high school. Residents of Glenburn enjoy school choice, which means students can choose where they want to go for high school.

Glenburn School (elementary and middle school) hosts recreation programs, and their school athletic teams are called the Glenburn Chargers.

== Military installation ==
The journalistic organization ProPublica reports that during the mid-twentieth-century a Ground-to-Air Transmitter (GAT) Facility for the CIM-10 Bomarc system was located in Glenburn, supervised from Dow Air Force Base in Bangor for the Bangor Air Defense Sector. Situated near to the current town offices, equipment and fuel storage facilities at the site contaminated the local groundwater to a degree that cleanup is expected to extend until the year 2039.
