= Jeff Timberlake =

American politician

Jeffrey Timberlake

Minority Leader of the Maine Senate
- In office December 2, 2020 – December 7, 2022
- Preceded by: Dana Dow
- Succeeded by: Trey Stewart

Member of the Maine Senate
- Incumbent
- Assumed office December 5, 2018
- Preceded by: Garrett Mason
- Constituency: 22nd district (2018–2022); 17th district (since 2022)

Member of the Maine House of Representatives
- In office December 1, 2010 – December 5, 2018
- Preceded by: Lawrence Sirois
- Succeeded by: Joshua Morris
- Constituency: 96th district (2010–2014); 75th district (2014–2018)

Personal details
- Party: Republican
- Education: Central Maine Community College

Jeffrey Timberlake is an American politician from Maine. A Republican, Timberlake represents District 17 in the Maine Senate, having previously represented District 22. Previously, he served in the Maine House of Representatives from 2010 to 2018. In the House, Timberlake represented District 96, which includes Hebron, Minot and his residence in Turner. He earned an associate degree in business management from Central Maine Community College. He is also a former member of the Turner Planning Board.

During his first term in the Senate, Timberlake served as Assistant Minority Leader. After Sen. Dana Dow lost re-election in November 2020, Timberlake was elected Minority Leader of the Republican caucus.

Maine House of Representatives
Preceded by Lawrence Sirois	Member of the Maine House of Representatives from the 96th district 2010–2014	Succeeded by Christine Burstein
Preceded by Stephen J. Wood	Member of the Maine House of Representatives from the 75th district 2014–2018	Succeeded by Joshua Morris
Maine Senate
Preceded by Garrett Mason	Member of the Maine Senate from the 22nd district 2018–2022	Succeeded by James Libby
Preceded by Dana Dow	Minority Leader of the Maine Senate; 2020–2022	Succeeded by Trey Stewart
Preceded by Russell Black	Member of the Maine Senate from the 17th district 2022–present	Incumbent
