= Lisa Keim =

American politician

Member of the Maine Senate from the 18th district
- In office December 2016 – December 4, 2024
- Preceded by: John Patrick

Personal details
- Party: Republican
- Children: 3
- Education: University of Southern Maine (BS)

Lisa Keim is an American politician who served as a Republican member of the Maine Senate from the 18th district. She was first elected to office in 2016. Following her re-election in 2022, Keim was chosen to be the Senate assistant minority leader.

== Early life and education ==
Keim holds a Bachelor of Science in leadership and marketing from the University of Southern Maine.

== Career ==
Keim was elected to the Maine Senate in 2016. During her tenure, she served as chair of the Senate Judiciary Committee and a member of the Senate State and Local Government Committee. As chair of the Judiciary Committee, Keim managed a working group to study Maine's legal aid system. She has also served as co-chair of the national Future of Work Task Force for the Council of State Governments.
