= Paul Davis (Maine politician) =

American politician

Paul T. Davis

Member of the Maine Senate from the 4th district
- In office December 3, 2014 – December 7, 2022
- Preceded by: David Dutremble
- Succeeded by: Stacey Guerin

Member of the Maine House of Representatives from the 26th district
- In office December 3, 2008 – December 3, 2014
- Preceded by: James Annis
- Succeeded by: Linda Sanborn

Minority Leader of the Maine Senate
- In office December 1, 2004 – December 6, 2006
- Succeeded by: Carol Weston

Member of the Maine Senate from the 27th district
- In office December 4, 2002 – December 6, 2006
- Preceded by: Michael F. Brennan
- Succeeded by: Douglas Smith

Member of the Maine Senate from the 8th district
- In office December 2, 1998 – December 4, 2002
- Preceded by: Stephen E. Hall
- Succeeded by: Ethan Strimling

Personal details
- Born: March 25, 1947 (age 79) Dexter, Maine
- Party: Republican
- Education: University of Maine

Paul T. Davis (born March 25, 1947) is an American politician from Maine. He has served in both the state Senate and state House of Representatives, and is a member of the Maine Republican Party.

Prior to entering politics, Davis served for 23 years as a state trooper. He was then elected to the Maine Senate, where he served as Assistant Minority Leader and Minority Leader. He was elected to the Maine House of Representatives in 2008 and re-elected in 2010 and 2012. He is a graduate of the University of Maine.

In June 2014, after months of negative campaigning on both sides, Davis won the Republican nomination for State Senate District 4, defeating incumbent Doug Thomas, with 57% of the vote.
