= Maine's 32nd State Senate district =

American legislative district

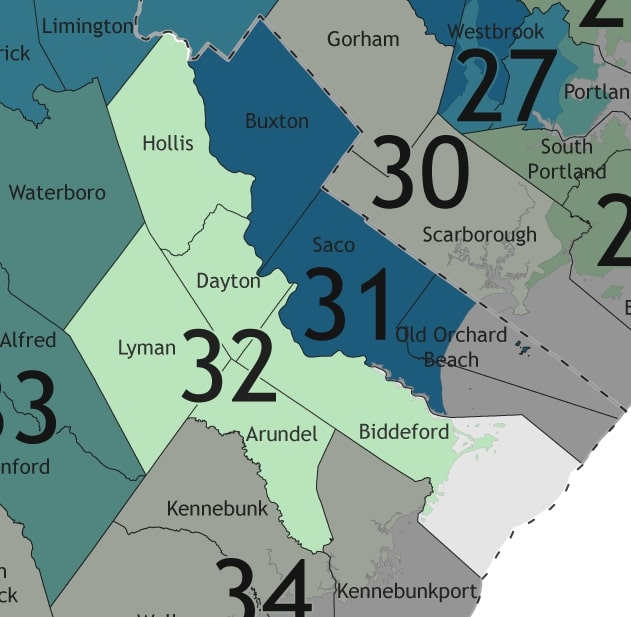
Senator
Henry Ingwersen; D–Arundel
- Population (2020): 38,530

Maine's 32nd State Senate district is one of 35 districts in the Maine Senate. It has been represented by Democrat Henry Ingwersen since 2022

== Geography ==
District 32 represents part of the county of York, stretching to include part of the Gulf of Maine, on the border of the city of Biddeford.

York County - 18.2% of county

City:

- Biddeford

Towns:

- Arundel
- Dayton
- Hollis
- Lyman

== Recent election results ==
=== 2022 ===
2022 Maine State Senate election, District 32
Party	Candidate	Votes	%
Democratic	Henry Ingwersen	9,676	57.3
Republican	David Corbett	7,209	42.7
Total votes		19,050	100.0
Democratic hold			

Elections prior to 2022 were held under different district lines.

=== 2024 ===
2024 Maine State Senate election, District 32
Party	Candidate	Votes	%
Democratic	Henry Ingwersen	12,262	58.4
Republican	Alfred Schutz	8,729	41.6
Total votes		20,991	100.0
Democratic hold			

== Historical election results ==
=== 2012 ===
2012 Maine State Senate election, District 32
Party	Candidate	Votes	%
Democratic	Geoffrey Gratwick	8,793	55.5
Republican	Nichi Farnham	8,295	44.5
Total votes		17,088	100
Democratic gain from Republican			

=== 2014 ===
2014 Maine State Senate election, District 32 (Note: This election was a Democratic Hold, as Valentino had been redistricted from the 5th in early 2014)
Party	Candidate	Votes	%
Democratic	David Dutremble	8,740	52.9
Republican	James Booth	7,067	42.8
Blank votes	None	704	4.3
Total votes		16,511	100
Democratic hold			

=== 2016 ===
2016 Maine State Senate election, District 32
Party	Candidate	Votes	%
Democratic	Susan Deschambault	11,880	59
Republican	Matthew Stone	8,249	41
Total votes		20,129	100
Democratic hold			

=== 2018 ===
2018 Maine State Senate election, District 32
Party	Candidate	Votes	%
Democratic	Susan Deschambault	10,620	62.6
Republican	Scott Normandeau	6,338	37.4
Total votes		16,958	100
Democratic hold			

=== 2020 ===
2020 Maine State Senate election, District 32
Party	Candidate	Votes	%
Democratic	Susan Deschambault	9,676	57.2
Republican	Robert Daigle	9,612	42.8
Total votes		22,450	100.0
Democratic hold			
