= Maine's 6th State Senate district =

American legislative district

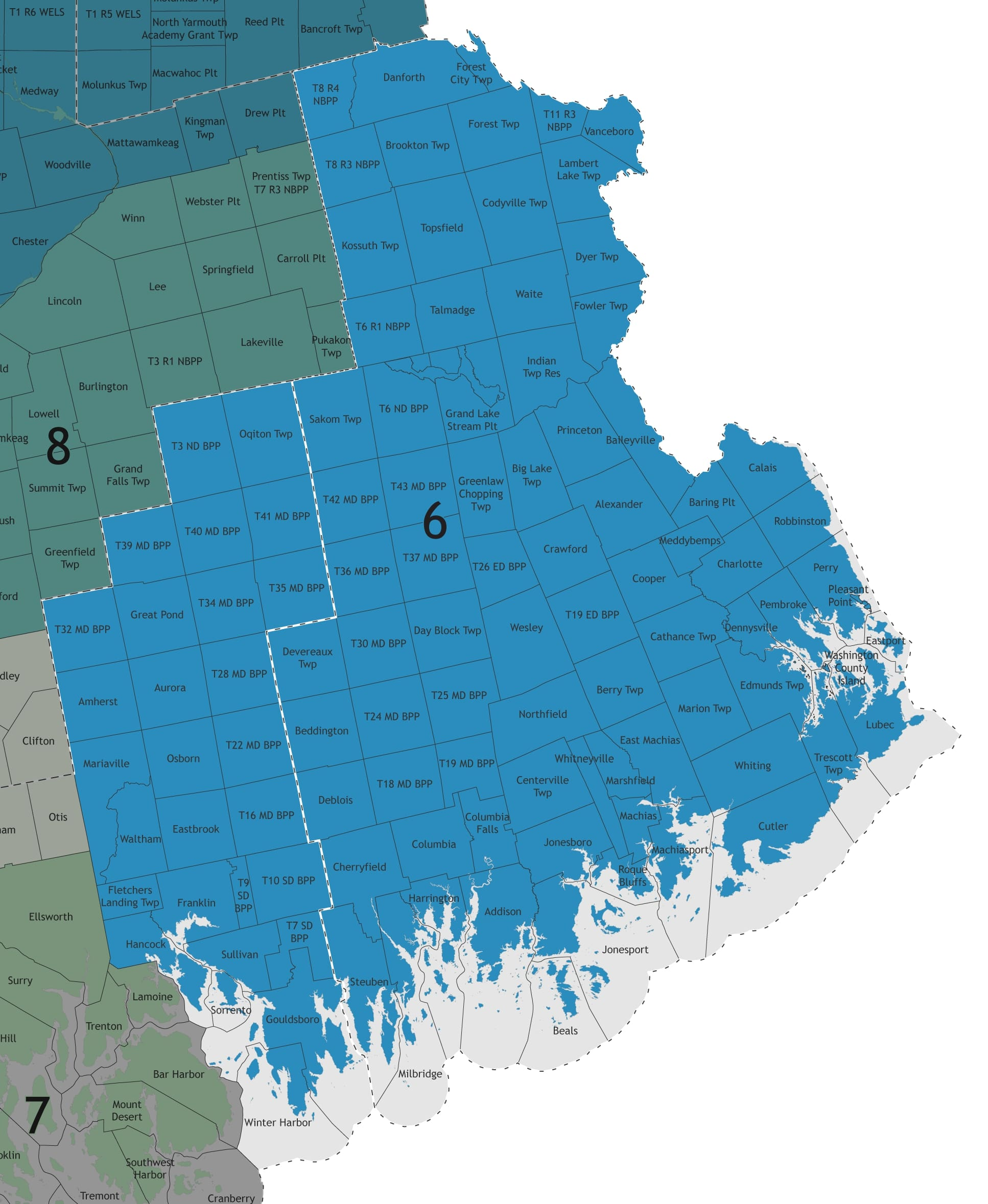
Senator
Marianne Moore; R–Calais
- Registration: 37.4% Republican; 17.9% Democratic; 44.7% No party preference
- Population (2020): 41,727

Maine's 6th State Senate district is one of 35 districts in the Maine Senate. It has been represented by Republican Marrianne Moore since 2018.

== Geography ==
District 6 contains the entirety of Washington County, as well as the easternmost segment of Hancock County. It is bordered by the Canadian province of New Brunswick .

Hancock County - 16.9% of county

Washington County - 100% of county

Hancock:

Towns:

- Amhurst
- Aurora
- Eastbrook
- Franklin
- Gouldsboro
- Great Pond
- Hancock
- Mariaville
- Osborn
- Sorrento
- Sullivan
- Waltham

Washington:

Somerset:

- Anson
- Athens
- Bingham
- Cambridge
- Caratunk
- Cornville
- Embden
- Fairfield
- Harmony
- Hartland
- Jackman
- Mercer
- Moose River
- Moscow
- New Portland
- Ripley
- St. Albans
- Smithfield
- Solon
- Starks

== Recent election results ==
=== 2022 ===
2022 Maine State Senate election, District 6
Party	Candidate	Votes	%
Republican	Marianne Moore	12,180	66.9
Democratic	Jonathon C. Goble	6,436	33.1
Total votes		19,416	100.0
Republican hold			

Elections prior to 2022 were held under different district lines.

=== 2024 ===
2024 Maine State Senate election, District 6
Party	Candidate	Votes	%
Republican	Marianne Moore	15,597	67.6
Democratic	Jonathon C. Goble	7,461	32.4
Total votes		23,193	100.0
Republican hold			

== Historical election results ==
=== 2012 ===
2012 Maine State Senate election, District 6
Party	Candidate	Votes	%
Democratic	James Boyle	11,879	55.5
Republican	Ruth Summers	9,525	44.5
Total votes		21,404	100

=== 2014 ===
2014 Maine State Senate election, District 6
Party	Candidate	Votes	%
Republican	David C. Burns	8,474	53.3
Democratic	Anne C. Perry	6,796	46.7
Blank votes	None	623	3.9
Total votes		15,893	100
Republican gain from Democratic			

=== 2016 ===
2016 Maine State Senate election, District 6
Party	Candidate	Votes	%
Republican	Joyce Maker	10,349	56.2
Democratic	Rock Alley	8,057	43.8
Total votes		18,406	100
Republican hold			

=== 2018 ===
2018 Maine State Senate election, District 6
Party	Candidate	Votes	%
Republican	Marianne Moore	8,979	61.3
Democratic	Christina Therrien	5,661	38.7
Total votes		14,640	100
Republican hold			

=== 2020 ===
2020 Maine State Senate election, District 6
Party	Candidate	Votes	%
Republican	Marianne Moore	11,853	62.8
Democratic	Jeffrey Lovit	7,016	37.2
Total votes		18,869	100
Republican hold			
