= Maine's 29th State Senate district =

American legislative district

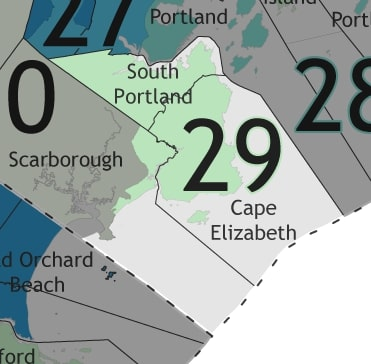
Senator
Anne Carney; D–Cape Elizabeth
- Population (2020): 38,645

Maine's 29th State Senate district is one of 35 districts in the Maine Senate. It has been represented by Democrat Anne Carney since 2020

== Geography ==
District 29 represents a small part of Cumberland County, including the city of South Portland and the town of Cape Elizabeth. It also includes a small part of the town of Scarborough.

Cumberland County - 12.8% of county

== Recent election results ==
=== 2022 ===
2022 Maine State Senate election, District 29
Party	Candidate	Votes	%
Democratic	Anne Carney	15,432	75.5
Republican	John Lewis	5,012	24.5
Total votes		20,444	100.0
Democratic hold			

Elections prior to 2022 were held under different district lines.

=== 2024 ===
2024 Maine State Senate election, District 29
Party	Candidate	Votes	%
Democratic	Anne Carney	17,518	74.9
Republican	Christopher M. Howell	5,884	25.1
Total votes		23,402	100.0
Democratic hold			

== Historical election results ==
=== 2012 ===
2012 Maine State Senate election, District 29
Party	Candidate	Votes	%
Republican	David Burns	7,158	41.9
Democratic	Anne Perry	6,262	37.7
Independent	F. James Whalen	3,182	19.2
Total votes		16,602	100
Republican hold			

=== 2014 ===
2014 Maine State Senate election, District 29 (Note: This election was a Democratic Hold, as Alfond had been redistricted from the 9th district in early 2014)
Party	Candidate	Votes	%
Democratic	Rebecca Millett	9,926	50.8
Republican	William DeSena	6,527	33.4
Green	Mark Diehl	2,073	10.6
Blank votes	None	995	5.1
Total votes		19,521	100
Democratic hold			

=== 2016 ===
2016 Maine State Senate election, District 29
Party	Candidate	Votes	%
Democratic	Rebecca Millett	13,684	62.5
Independent	Martha MacAuslan	8,196	37.5
Total votes		21,880	100
Democratic hold			

=== 2018 ===
2018 Maine State Senate election, District 29
Party	Candidate	Votes	%
Democratic	Rebecca Millett	15,077	74.3
Republican	George Van Syckel	5,215	25.7
Total votes		20,292	100
Democratic hold			

=== 2020 ===
2020 Maine State Senate election, District 29
Party	Candidate	Votes	%
Democratic	Anne Carney	16,847	67.2
Republican	Stephanie Anderson	8,222	32.8
Total votes		25,063	100
Democratic hold			
