= Maine's 16th State Senate district =

American legislative district

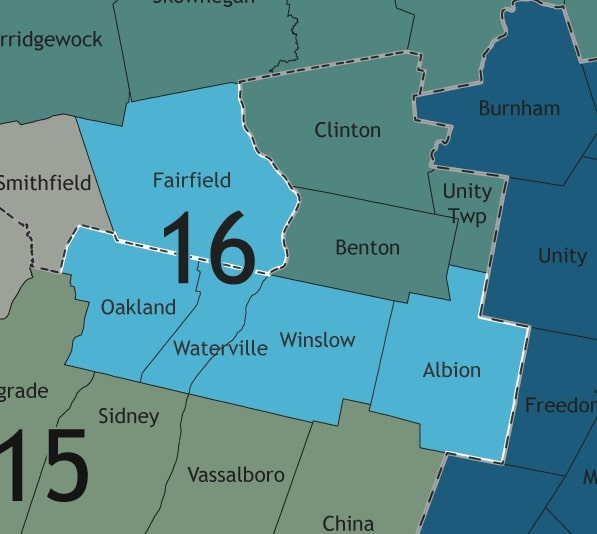
Senator
| Scott Cyrway; R–Albion |
- Population (2020): 39,851

Maine's 16th State Senate district is one of 35 districts in the Maine Senate. It has been represented by Republican Scott Cyrway since 2024.

== Geography ==
District 16 is made up of a small part of Kennebec County, including the city of Waterville. It also includes the town of Fairfield of the county of Somerset

Kennebec County - 25.9% of county

Somerset - 12.8% of county

Kennebec:

City:

- Waterville

Towns:

- Albion
- Oakland
- Winslow

Somerset:

Town:

- Fairfield

== Recent election results ==
=== 2022 ===
2022 Maine State Senate election, District 16
| Party | Candidate | Votes | % |
|---|---|---|---|
| Democratic | David LaFountain | 8,349 | 51 |
| Republican | Michael D. Perkins | 8,022 | 49 |
| Total votes | | 16,371 | 100.0 |
| Democratic gain from Republican | | | |

Elections prior to 2022 were held under different district lines.

=== 2024 ===
2024 Maine State Senate election, District 16
| Party | Candidate | Votes | % |
|---|---|---|---|
| Republican | Scott Cyrway | 10,806 | 53.7 |
| Democratic | Nathaniel White | 9,305 | 46.3 |
| Total votes | | 20,111 | 100.0 |
| Republican gain from Democratic | | | |

== Historical election results ==
=== 2012 ===
2012 Maine State Senate election, District 16
| Party | Candidate | Votes | % |
|---|---|---|---|
| Democratic | Margaret Craven | 10,208 | 67.4 |
| Republican | Robert Reed | 4,933 | 32.6 |
| Total votes | | 19,323 | 100 |
| Democratic hold | | | |

=== 2014 ===
2014 Maine State Senate election, District 16
| Party | Candidate | Votes | % |
|---|---|---|---|
| Republican | Scott Cyrway | 8,523 | 53.3 |
| Democratic | Colleen Machowicz | 6,936 | 43.4 |
| Blank votes | None | 530 | 3.3 |
| Total votes | | 15,989 | 100 |
| Republican gain from Democratic | | | |

=== 2016 ===
2016 Maine State Senate election, District 16
| Party | Candidate | Votes | % |
|---|---|---|---|
| Republican | Scott Cyrway | 10,378 | 54 |
| Democratic | Henry Murphy Beck | 8,846 | 46 |
| Total votes | | 19,224 | 100 |
| Republican hold | | | |

=== 2018 ===
2018 Maine State Senate election, District 16
| Party | Candidate | Votes | % |
|---|---|---|---|
| Republican | Scott Cyrway | 7,902 | 49.5 |
| Democratic | Karen Kusiak | 7,778 | 48.7 |
| Write-in | | 277 | 1.7 |
| Total votes | | 15,957 | 100 |
| Republican hold | | | |

=== 2020 ===
2020 Maine State Senate election, District 16
| Party | Candidate | Votes | % |
|---|---|---|---|
| Republican | Scott Cyrway | 11,456 | 56.2 |
| Democratic | Hilary Kock | 8,920 | 43.8 |
| Total votes | | 20,376 | 100 |
| Republican hold | | | |
