= Maine's 25th State Senate district =

American legislative district

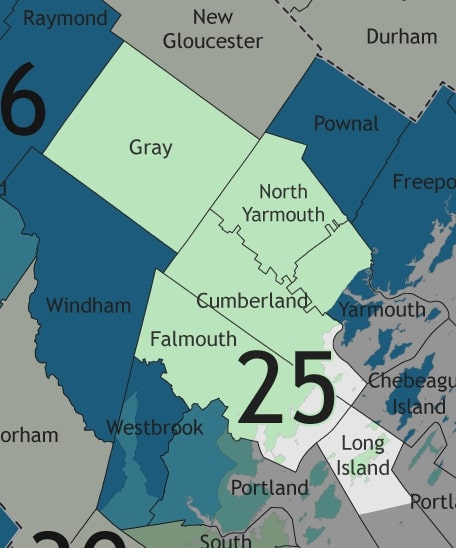
Senator
Teresa Pierce; D–Falmouth
- Population (2020): 40,585

Maine's 25th State Senate district is one of 35 districts in the Maine Senate. It has been represented by Senate Majority Leader, Democrat Teresa Pierce since 2022

== Geography ==
District 25 represents the southeastern corner of Cumberland County.

Cumberland County - 13.4% of county

Cumberland:

Towns:

- Cumberland
- Falmouth
- Gray
- Long Island
- North Yarmouth
- (Part of) Yarmouth

== Recent election results ==
=== 2022 ===
2022 Maine State Senate election, District 25
Party	Candidate	Votes	%
Democratic	Teresa Pierce	15,315	63.3
Republican	Jennifer White	8,845	36.6
Total votes		24,160	100.0
Democratic hold			

Elections prior to 2022 were held under different district lines.

=== 2024 ===
2024 Maine State Senate election, District 25
Party	Candidate	Votes	%
Democratic	Teresa Pierce	17,896	64.5
Republican	James Read	9,835	35.5
Total votes		27,731	100.0
Democratic hold			

== Historical election results ==
=== 2012 ===
2012 Maine State Senate election, District 25
Party	Candidate	Votes	%
Democratic	Colleen Lachowicz	8,712	52.8
Republican	Thomas Martin Jr.	7,773	47.2
Total votes		16,485	100
Democratic gain from Republican			

=== 2014 ===
2014 Maine State Senate election, District 25 (Note: This election was contested, as it was found that 21 ballots from the town of Long Island had accidentally been cast twice for Cathy Manchester. Because of this, she was technically senator provisionally for six days)
Party	Candidate	Votes	%
Democratic	Catherine Breen	10,930	48.1
Republican	Cathy Manchester	10,898	48
Blank votes	None	888	3.9
Total votes		22,716	100
Democratic hold			

=== 2016 ===
2016 Maine State Senate election, District 25
Party	Candidate	Votes	%
Democratic	Catherine Breen	15,546	58
Republican	Barton Ladd	11,247	42
Total votes		26,793	100
Democratic hold			

=== 2018 ===
2018 Maine State Senate election, District 25
Party	Candidate	Votes	%
Democratic	Catherine Breen	15,348	61.9
Republican	Cathleen Nichols	9,448	38.1
Total votes		24,796	100
Democratic hold			

=== 2020 ===
2020 Maine State Senate election, District 25
Party	Candidate	Votes	%
Democratic	Catherine Breen	18,587	62
Republican	Jennifer White	11,404	38
Total votes		29,991	100
Democratic hold			
