= Cary Weston =

American politician

Cary Weston (born 1972) is an American politician from Maine. A Republican from Bangor, Weston was on the Bangor City Council from 2009 to 2012. In 2011–12, Weston was the Council Chairman (Mayor). Prior to his election to City Council, Weston was the founding chair of a networking group of young professionals in their 20s and 30s called 'Fusion Bangor'.

In September 2013, Weston announced that he would challenge Democratic incumbent State Senator Geoffrey Gratwick for District 32, which encompasses Bangor and neighboring Hermon. In November 2014, Gratwick was re-elected to the Maine Senate, defeating Weston. Gratwick won a majority of the votes in Bangor, while Weston won the smaller town of Hermon.

In 2024, Weston was a candidate for Commissioner of Penobscot County, Maine.

== Personal ==
Weston is a graduate of Bangor High School and the University of Maine. In 2004, he graduated from the Bangor Region Leadership Institute.

== See also ==
- List of mayors of Bangor, Maine
