= Maine's 12th State Senate district =

American legislative district

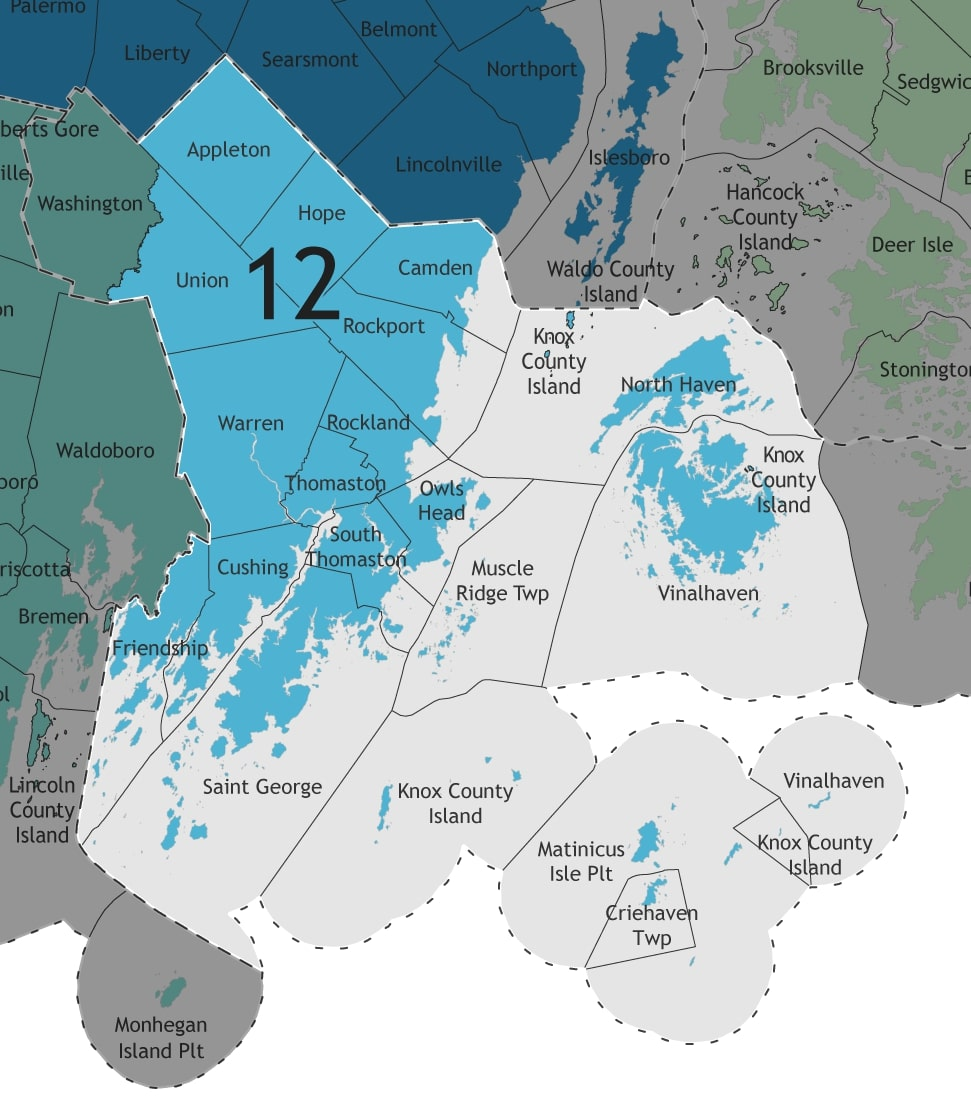
Senator
Anne 'Pinny' Beebe-Center; D–Rockland
- Registration: 36.6% Democratic; 25.5% Republican; 37.9% No party preference
- Population (2020): 39,183

Maine's 12th State Senate district is one of 35 districts in the Maine Senate. It has been represented by Democrat Anne 'Pinny' Beebe-Center since 2022.

== Geography ==
District 12 comprises the vast majority of Knox County, excluding the towns of Isle au Haut and Washington.

Knox County - 95.9% of county

Knox:

City:

- Rockland

Towns:

- Appleton
- Camden
- Cushing
- Friendship
- Hope
- North Haven
- Owls Head
- Rockport
- Saint George
- South Thomaston
- Thomaston
- Union
- Vinalhaven
- Warren

== Recent election results ==
=== 2022 ===
2022 Maine State Senate election, District 11
Party	Candidate	Votes	%
Democratic	Anne 'Pinny' Beebe-Center	12,525	59.3
Republican	Scott Rocknak	8,597	40.7
Total votes		21,122	100.0
Democratic hold			

Elections prior to 2022 were held under different district lines.

=== 2024 ===
2024 Maine State Senate election, District 11
Party	Candidate	Votes	%
Democratic	Anne 'Pinny' Beebe-Center	14,344	59
Republican	Scott Rocknak	9,979	41
Total votes		24,323	100.0
Democratic hold			

== Historical election results ==
=== 2012 ===
2012 Maine State Senate election, District 11
Party	Candidate	Votes	%
Republican	Gary Plummer	12,104	60.6
Independent	Martin Shuer	7,858	39.4
Total votes		19,962	100
Republican hold			

=== 2014 ===
2014 Maine State Senate election, District 11
Party	Candidate	Votes	%
Democratic	David Miramant	9,162	49.9
Republican	Paula Sutton	8,434	45.9
Blank votes	None	777	4.2
Total votes		18,373	100
Democratic gain from Republican			

=== 2016 ===
2018 Maine State Senate election, District 11
Party	Candidate	Votes	%
Democratic	David Miramant	11,608	51.8
Republican	David F. Emery	10,823	48.2
Total votes		22,431	100
Democratic hold			

=== 2018 ===
2018 Maine State Senate election, District 11
Party	Candidate	Votes	%
Democratic	David Miramant	12,467	63.4
Republican	Wendy Pelletier	7,192	36.6
Total votes		19,659	100
Democratic hold			

=== 2020 ===
2020 Maine State Senate election, District 11
Party	Candidate	Votes	%
Democratic	David Miramant	14,049	57.6
Republican	Gordon Page	10,826	42.4
Total votes		10,342	100
Democratic hold			
