= Maine's 9th State Senate district =

American legislative district

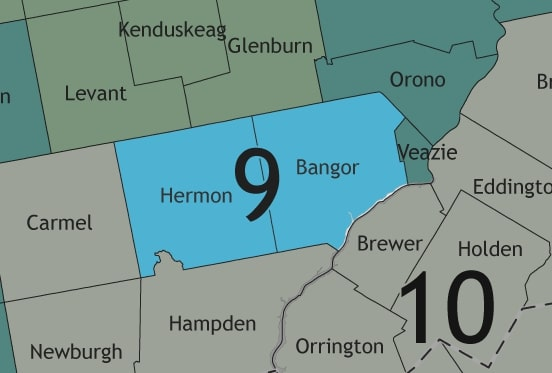
Senator
Joe Baldacci; D–Bangor
- Registration: 30.4% Democratic; 21.4% Republican; 48.2% No party preference
- Population (2020): 38,218

Maine's 9th State Senate district is one of 35 districts in the Maine Senate. It has been represented by Democrat Joe Baldacci since 2020.

== Geography ==
District 9 is made up of the city of Bangor and the town of Hermon, comprising a small part of Penobscot County.

Penobscot County - 25.1% of county

== Recent election results ==
=== 2022 ===
2022 Maine State Senate election, District 9
Party	Candidate	Votes	%
Democratic	Joe Baldacci	9,055	59.2
Republican	Suzette Furrow	6,253	40.8
Total votes		15,308	100.0
Democratic hold			

Elections prior to 2022 were held under different district lines.

=== 2024 ===
2024 Maine State Senate election, District 9
Party	Candidate	Votes	%
Democratic	Joe Baldacci	11,601	58.6
Republican	Richard Cyr	8,196	41.4
Total votes		19,797	100.0
Democratic hold			

== Historical election results ==
=== 2012 ===
2012 Maine State Senate election, District 9
Party	Candidate	Votes	%
Democratic	Anne Haskell	14,186	72.7
Republican	Kirsten Martin	5,352	27.3
Total votes		19,538	100
Democratic hold			

=== 2014 ===
2014 Maine State Senate election, District 9
Party	Candidate	Votes	%
Democratic	Geoffrey Gratwick	7,583	51.1
Republican	Beverly Ulenhake	6,676	45.3
Blank votes	None	526	3.6
Total votes		14,741	100
Republican gain from Democratic			

=== 2016 ===
2018 Maine State Senate election, District 9
Party	Candidate	Votes	%
Democratic	Geoffrey Gratwick	10,962	58
Republican	Laurence Willey	7,911	42
Total votes		18,873	100
Democratic hold			

=== 2018 ===
2018 Maine State Senate election, District 9
Party	Candidate	Votes	%
Democratic	Geoffrey Gratwick	9,203	60.6
Republican	Beverly Ulenhake	5,990	39.4
Total votes		15,193	100
Democratic hold			

=== 2020 ===
2020 Maine State Senate election, District 9
Party	Candidate	Votes	%
Democratic	Joe Baldacci	10,960	55
Republican	Sean Hinkley	6,706	33.7
Independent	Teresa Montague	2,248	11.3
Total votes		19,940	100
Democratic hold			
