= Joe Perry (politician) =

American businessman and politician

Treasurer of Maine
- Incumbent
- Assumed office January 9, 2025
- Governor: Janet Mills
- Preceded by: Henry Beck

Member of the Maine House of Representatives
- In office December 7, 2022 – December 2024
- Preceded by: Mark Bryant
- Succeeded by: Sean Faircloth
- Constituency: 24th district
- In office March 2019 – December 7, 2022
- Preceded by: Aaron Frey
- Succeeded by: Sophia Warren
- Constituency: 124th district

Member of the Maine Senate from the 32nd district
- In office December 1, 2004 – December 1, 2010
- Preceded by: Tom Sawyer
- Succeeded by: Nichi Farnham

Personal details
- Born: Bangor, Maine, U.S.
- Party: Democratic
- Education: University of Maine (attended)

Joseph C. "Joe" Perry is an American businessman and politician from Maine. A Democrat, he is serving as the Treasurer of Maine since January 2025, and served previously in the Maine House of Representatives and Maine Senate.

== Politics ==
Perry served in the Maine Senate from District 32, which included his hometown of Bangor and Hermon. He was first elected to the Senate in 2004 after serving from 8 years (1996–2004) in the Maine House of Representatives representing part of Bangor. He defeated incumbent Republican Senator Tom Sawyer by 280 votes. In 2015, Perry won a seat on the Bangor City Council.

In the 124th legislature (2008–2010), Perry served as Senate Chair of the Joint Standing Committee on Taxation.

In 2010, Perry sought re-election to represent District 32. However, he was defeated with 42% of the vote in a two-way race to Republican Nichi Farnham.

In March 2019, Perry won the special election for the Maine House's 124th District. The special election was called after incumbent Democrat Aaron Frey resigned to become Attorney General of Maine. Perry defeated Republican Thomas White to win the seat.

On December 4, 2024, Perry was elected as Treasurer for the State of Maine with considerable bipartisan support. With his new office he forfeited his recently reelected position as state representative, with Sean Faircloth winning the subsequent special election.

== Personal life ==
Perry attended the University of Maine at Orono from 1984 to 1988.

He owns Joe's Market in Bangor.

Political offices
Preceded by Henry Beck	Treasurer of Maine; 2025–present	Incumbent
