= Senator Baldacci =

Senator Baldacci may refer to:

- Joe Baldacci (born 1965), Maine State Senate
- John Baldacci (born 1955), Maine State Senate
