= Dysart's =

Maine truck stop & restaurant

- Company type: Private
- Industry: Retail (truck stops) (convenience stores)
- Founded: 1934; 92 years ago
- Headquarters: Hermon and Bangor, Maine
- Number of locations: 9
- Website: dysarts.com

Dysart's is an American truck stop and restaurant chain located in Hermon and Bangor, Maine. Founded in 1967 by the Dysart family, it was named No. 1 for "best gas station and truck stop food in America" by Food & Wine magazine (2022). The restaurant received national attention when a blooper reel from a television commercial for the establishment, featuring locals Jack and Sonya Palmer, was uploaded to social media. The video was spoofed on Saturday Night Live in 2018.

== History ==
The family trucking business was founded in 1920 by Marshall and Blanche Dysart, with a truck stop opening in 1934. The business remained there until 1958 when it moved to Brewer, Maine and then to its current location in Hermon after Interstate 95 was completed in Bangor, Maine. Founders David and Irene Dysart opened the truck stop and restaurant on Mother's Day, Sunday, May 14, 1967. David hired husband and wife, Greg and Betty Feeney, to run the truck stop kitchen; with Greg offering home-style cooking with large portions and Betty baking desserts.

For 52 years, Dysart's was open 24 hours a day, "every day except Christmas". On October 1, 2019, the restaurant reduced its hours to 5 a.m. to midnight due to a change in trucking laws and local establishments eliminating overnight shifts. The fuel operations and convenient store still operates 24/7. In 2014, Dysart's opened a second location in Bangor, Maine. Currently, there are 9 travel stops located throughout Maine; with two restaurants located in Hermon and Bangor. In 2025, a proposal was announced by Dysart's for a new location in Ellsworth, Maine.

In 2022, Food & Wine magazine named Dysart's the "best gas station and truck stop food in America." Several trucking companies have listed Dysart's as one of the "10 Best Truck Stops" in America, voted by truckers, including Trucker Tools, Northeast Technical Institute, Hugo Hunter, Prime Inc, Basic Block, among others.

David Dysart died in 1999 at the age of 71. Milton Dysart, David's cousin and co-founder, died on May 29, 2018.

== Commercial ==
Dysart's received national attention in 2012 when local customers, Jack and Sonya Palmer of Hermon, appeared in a TV commercial for the restaurant. Due to Jack's continued inability to remember the words "buttery, flaky crust", the couple's outtakes went viral online. The Palmers were parodied in a 2018 "Saturday Night Live" sketch called Commercial Shoot with Will Ferrell and Kate McKinnon. Jack Palmer died on August 4, 2024.
