= Bruce Bickford =

Bruce Bickford may refer to:

- Bruce Bickford (animator) (1947–2019), American maker of animated films
- Bruce Bickford (athlete) (born 1957), American long-distance runner
- Bruce Bickford (politician) (born 1955), American politician, member of the Maine Senate
