= Senator Farnham =

Senator Farnham may refer to:

- Nichi Farnham (born 1963), Maine State Senate
- Roswell Farnham (1827–1903), Vermont State Senate
