= Rebecca Millett =

American politician (born 1962)

Rebecca Millet

Member of the Maine State Senate
- In office December 5, 2014 – December 2, 2020
- Preceded by: David C. Burns
- Succeeded by: Anne Carney
- Constituency: 29th district
- In office November 6, 2012 – December 5, 2014
- Preceded by: Cynthia Dill
- Succeeded by: Brian Langley
- Constituency: 7th district

Member of the Maine House of Representatives
- In office December 7, 2022 – December 4, 2024
- Preceded by: Laurie Osher
- Succeeded by: Michelle Boyer
- Constituency: 123rd district
- In office December 2, 2020 – December 7, 2022
- Preceded by: Anne Carney
- Succeeded by: James White
- Constituency: 30th district

Personal details
- Born: October 5, 1962 (age 63)
- Party: Democratic
- Education: American University (BA, BS); University of Chicago (MBA)
- Website: Official site

Rebecca J. Millett (born October 5, 1962) is an American politician from Cape Elizabeth, Maine. A Democrat, she served as a state Senator from Maine's 29th District, from 2012 to 2020, and a state Representative from 2020 to 2024. From 2004 to 2010, Millett served on the Cape Elizabeth School Board.

She won a primary for Senate 29 over South Portland Representative Bryan Kaenrath in June 2012 and was first elected to the Maine State Senate the following November after defeating Republican Mike Wallace. The seat was held by Larry Bliss until his mid-term resignation in 2011. He was replaced by Cape Elizabeth resident and State Representative Cynthia Dill, who in turn decided not to seek a full term and instead to pursue the open seat in the United States Senate.

Millett grew up in Portland, Maine, and attended area public schools. She earned a BA and BS from American University in Washington D.C., and an MBA in finance from the University of Chicago.
