= 2024 Maine Senate election =

- November 5, 2024

All 35 seats in the Maine Senate 18 seats needed for a majority
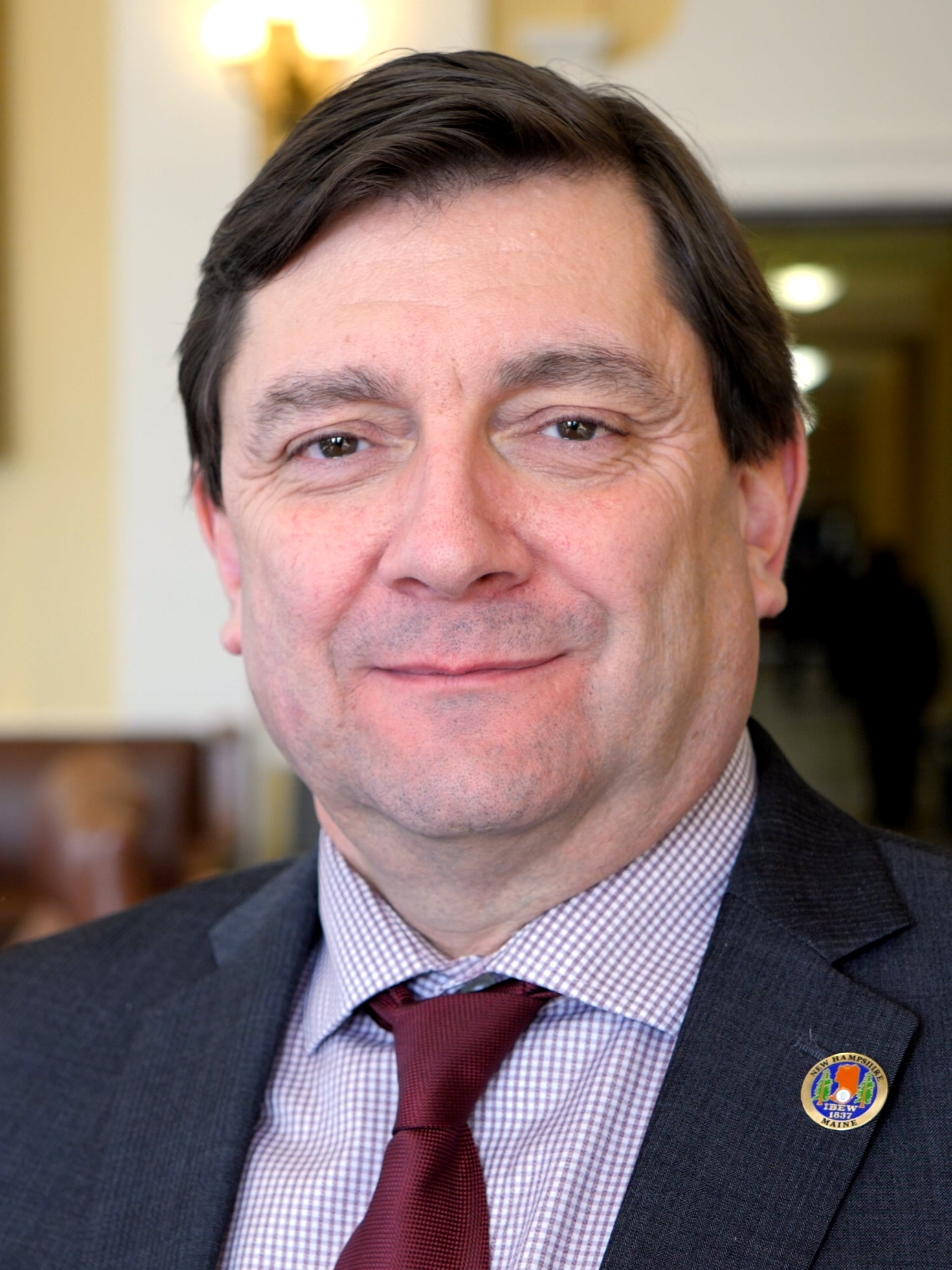

	Majority party	Minority party
Leader	Troy Jackson (term-limited)	Trey Stewart
Party	Democratic	Republican
Leader since	December 7, 2016	November 10, 2022
Leader's seat	1st – Allagash	2nd – Presque Isle
Seats before	22	13
Seats after	20	15
Seat change	▼2	▲2
Popular vote	417,563	379,791
Percentage	52.27%	47.54%
- Republican gain Democratic hold Republican hold 50–60% 60–70% 70–80% >90% 50–60% 60–70%
Senate President before election
Troy Jackson
Democratic
Elected Senate President
Mattie Daughtry
Democratic

The 2024 Maine Senate election was held on Tuesday, November 5, 2024, with the primary election using instant-runoff voting held on June 11, 2024, to elect the 132nd Maine Senate. Voters in all 35 districts of the Maine Senate elected their senators. The elections coincided with the elections for other offices, including for U.S. President, U.S. Senate, U.S. House and the Maine House of Representatives.

== Background ==
Democrats have maintained control of the state senate since the 2018 election and the state House of Representatives since the 2012 election.

== Retirements ==
Seven incumbents did not seek re-election.

=== Democrats ===
- District 1: Troy Jackson was term-limited.
- District 16: David LaFountain retired.
- District 24: Eloise Vitelli was term-limited.
- District 28: Ben Chipman was term-limited.

=== Republicans ===
- District 15: Matthew Pouliot retired.
- District 19: Lisa Keim was term-limited (ran for Oxford County Commission).
- District 20: Eric Brakey retired.

== Incumbents defeated ==
=== In primary election ===
One incumbent senator, a Republican, was defeated in the June 11 primary election.

==== Republicans ====
- District 10: Peter Lyford lost renomination to David Haggan.

== Predictions ==
Source	Ranking	As of
Sabato's Crystal Ball	Likely D	October 23, 2024

== Results ==
Italics denote an open seat held by the incumbent party; bold text denotes a gain for a party.

State Senate District	Incumbent	Party	Elected Senator	Outcome
1st	Troy Jackson	Dem	**Susan Y. Bernard**	**Rep Gain**
2nd	Harold L. "Trey" Stewart III	Rep	Harold L. "Trey" Stewart III	Rep Hold
3rd	Bradlee Thomas "Brad" Farrin	Rep	Bradlee Thomas "Brad" Farrin	Rep Hold
4th	Stacey K. Guerin	Rep	Stacey K. Guerin	Rep Hold
5th	Russell J. Black	Rep	Russell J. Black	Rep Hold
6th	Marianne Moore	Rep	Marianne Moore	Rep Hold
7th	Nicole C. Grohoski	Dem	Nicole C. Grohoski	Dem Hold
8th	Michael "Mike" Tipping	Dem	Michael "Mike" Tipping	Dem Hold
9th	Joseph M. "Joe" Baldacci	Dem	Joseph M. "Joe" Baldacci	Dem Hold
10th	Peter Lyford	Rep	David G. Haggan	Rep Hold
11th	Glenn Chip Curry	Dem	Glenn Chip Curry	Dem Hold
12th	Anne H. "Pinny" Beebe-Center	Dem	Anne H. "Pinny" Beebe-Center	Dem Hold
13th	Cameron D. Reny	Dem	Cameron D. Reny	Dem Hold
14th	Craig V. Hickman	Dem	Craig V. Hickman	Dem Hold
15th	Matthew Pouliot	Rep	Richard T. Bradstreet	Rep Hold
16th	David LaFountain	Dem	**Scott Wynn Cyrway**	**Rep Gain**
17th	Jeffrey L. "Jeff" Timberlake	Rep	Jeffrey L. "Jeff" Timberlake	Rep Hold
18th	Richard A. "Rick" Bennett	Rep	Richard A. "Rick" Bennett	Rep Hold
19th	Lisa Keim	Rep	Joseph E. Martin	Rep Hold
20th	Eric Brakey	Rep	Bruce Bickford	Rep Hold
21st	Margaret R. "Peggy" Rotundo	Dem	Margaret R. "Peggy" Rotundo	Dem Hold
22nd	James D. Libby	Rep	James D. Libby	Rep Hold
23rd	Matthea Elisabeth "Mattie" Daughtry	Dem	Matthea Elisabeth "Mattie" Daughtry	Dem Hold
24th	Eloise Vitelli	Dem	Denise Tepler	Dem Hold
25th	Teresa S. Pierce	Dem	Teresa S. Pierce	Dem Hold
26th	Timothy E. "Tim" Nangle	Dem	Timothy E. "Tim" Nangle	Dem Hold
27th	Jill C. Duson	Dem	Jill C. Duson	Dem Hold
28th	Ben Chipman	Dem	Rachel Talbot Ross	Dem Hold
29th	Anne M. Carney	Dem	Anne M. Carney	Dem Hold
30th	Stacy Fielding Brenner	Dem	Stacy Fielding Brenner	Dem Hold
31st	Donna Bailey	Dem	Donna Bailey	Dem Hold
32nd	Henry L. Ingwersen	Dem	Henry L. Ingwersen	Dem Hold
33rd	Matthew A. Harrington	Rep	Matthew A. Harrington	Rep Hold
34th	Joseph E. "Joe" Rafferty Jr.	Dem	Joseph E. "Joe" Rafferty Jr.	Dem Hold
35th	Mark W. Lawrence	Dem	Mark W. Lawrence	Dem Hold

== Detailed results ==
=== District 1 ===
1st District Democratic primary details

Democratic Primary, 1st District
Party	Candidate	Votes	%
Democratic	Vaughn James McLaughlin	Unopposed	
Total votes		1,311	100.0

1st District Republican primary details

Republican Primary, 1st District
Party	Candidate	Votes	%
Republican	Susan Y. Bernard	Unopposed	
Total votes		2,540	100.0

2024 Maine Senate election, 1st District
Party	Candidate	Votes	%
Republican	Susan Y. Bernard	13,248	65.78
Democratic	Vaughn James McLaughlin	6,892	34.22
Total votes		20,140	100.00
Republican gain from Democratic			

=== District 2 ===
2nd District Democratic primary details

Democratic Primary, 2nd District
Party	Candidate	Votes	%
Democratic	Matthew J. Rush	Unopposed	
Total votes		626	100.0

2nd District Republican primary details

Republican Primary, 2nd District
Party	Candidate	Votes	%
Republican	Harold L. "Trey" Stewart III (Incumbent)	Unopposed	
Total votes		2,176	100.0

2024 Maine Senate election, 2nd District
Party	Candidate	Votes	%
Republican	Harold L. "Trey" Stewart III (Incumbent)	13,695	65.78
Democratic	Matthew J. Rush	6,999	34.22
Total votes		20,694	100.00
Republican hold			

=== District 3 ===
3rd District Democratic primary details

Democratic Primary, 3rd District
Party	Candidate	Votes	%
Democratic	Ethan S. Brownell	Unopposed	
Total votes		1,005	100.0

3rd District Republican primary details

Republican Primary, 3rd District
Party	Candidate	Votes	%
Republican	Bradlee Thomas "Brad" Farrin (Incumbent)	Unopposed	
Total votes		2,176	100.0

2024 Maine Senate election, 3rd District
Party	Candidate	Votes	%
Republican	Bradlee Thomas "Brad" Farrin (Incumbent)	14,088	67.60
Democratic	Vaughn James McLaughlin	6,750	32.40
Total votes		20,828	100.00
Republican hold			

=== District 4 ===
4th District Democratic primary details

Democratic Primary, 4th District
Party	Candidate	Votes	%
Democratic	Richard A. Evans	Unopposed	
Total votes		979	100.0

4th District Republican primary details

Republican Primary, 4th District
Party	Candidate	Votes	%
Republican	Stacey Guerin (Incumbent)	Unopposed	
Total votes		2,864	100.0

2024 Maine Senate election, 4th District
Party	Candidate	Votes	%
Republican	Stacey Guerin (Incumbent)	15,741	67.37
Democratic	Richard A. Evans	7,624	32.63
Total votes		23,365	100.00
Republican hold			

=== District 5 ===
5th District Democratic primary details

Democratic Primary, 5th District
Party	Candidate	Votes	%
Democratic	Kathleen B. O’Donnell	Unopposed	
Total votes		1,099	100.0

5th District Republican primary details

Republican Primary, 5th District
Party	Candidate	Votes	%
Republican	Russell Black (Incumbent)	Unopposed	
Total votes		2,201	100.0

2024 Maine Senate election, 5th District
Party	Candidate	Votes	%
Republican	Russell Black (Incumbent)	15,267	65.83
Democratic	Kathleen B. O’Donnell	7,926	34.17
Total votes		23,193	100.00
Republican hold			

=== District 6 ===
6th District Democratic primary details

Democratic Primary, 6th District
Party	Candidate	Votes	%
Democratic	Jonathan C. Goble	Unopposed	
Total votes		1,258	100.0

6th District Republican primary details

Republican Primary, 6th District
Party	Candidate	Votes	%
Republican	Marianne Moore (Incumbent)	Unopposed	
Total votes		2,737	100.0

2024 Maine Senate election, 6th District
Party	Candidate	Votes	%
Republican	Marianne Moore (Incumbent)	15,597	67.64
Democratic	Jonathan C. Goble	7,461	32.36
Total votes		23,058	100.00
Republican hold			

=== District 7 ===
7th District Democratic primary details

Democratic Primary, 7th District
Party	Candidate	Votes	%
Democratic	Nicole Grohoski (Incumbent)	Unopposed	
Total votes		2,477	100.0

7th District Republican primary details

Republican Primary, 7th District
Party	Candidate	Votes	%
Republican	Sherman Hutchins	Unopposed	
Total votes		2,028	100.0

2024 Maine Senate election, 7th District
Party	Candidate	Votes	%
Democratic	Nicole Grohoski (Incumbent)	15,692	62.09
Republican	Sherman Hutchins	9,606	37.91
Total votes		25,298	100.00
Democratic hold			

=== District 8 ===
8th District Democratic primary details

Democratic Primary, 8th District
Party	Candidate	Votes	%
Democratic	Mike Tipping (Incumbent)	Unopposed	
Total votes		1,160	100.0

8th District Republican primary details

Republican Primary, 8th District
Party	Candidate	Votes	%
Republican	Leo C. Kenney	Unopposed	
Total votes		1,323	100.0

2024 Maine Senate election, 8th District
Party	Candidate	Votes	%
Democratic	Mike Tipping (Incumbent)	10,240	50.32
Republican	Leo C. Kenney	10,108	49.68
Total votes		20,348	100.00
Democratic hold			

=== District 9 ===
9th District Democratic primary details

Democratic Primary, 9th District
Party	Candidate	Votes	%
Democratic	Joe Baldacci (Incumbent)	Unopposed	
Total votes		1,111	100.0

9th District Republican primary details

Republican Primary, 9th District
Party	Candidate	Votes	%
Republican	Sean Paul Hinkley	Unopposed	
Total votes		1,382	100.0

2024 Maine Senate election, 9th District
Party	Candidate	Votes	%
Democratic	Joe Baldacci (Incumbent)	11,601	58.60
Republican	Sean Paul Hinkley	8,196	41.40
Total votes		19,797	100.00
Democratic hold			

=== District 10 ===
10th District Democratic primary details

Democratic Primary, 10th District
Party	Candidate	Votes	%
Democratic	Michele LaBree Daniels	Unopposed	
Total votes		1,131	100.0

10th District Republican primary details

Republican Primary, 10th District
Party	Candidate	Votes	%
Republican	David Haggan	Unopposed	
Total votes		1,689	100.0

2024 Maine Senate election, 10th District
Party	Candidate	Votes	%
Republican	David Haggan	14,095	56.90
Democratic	Michele Labree Daniels	10,676	43.10
Total votes		24,771	100.00
Republican hold			

=== District 11 ===
11th District Democratic primary details

Democratic Primary, 11th District
Party	Candidate	Votes	%
Democratic	Chip Curry (Incumbent)	Unopposed	
Total votes		1,111	100.0

11th District Republican primary details

Republican Primary, 11th District
Party	Candidate	Votes	%
Republican	Robert Charles Meyer	Unopposed	
Total votes		1,979	100.0

2024 Maine Senate election, 11th District
Party	Candidate	Votes	%
Democratic	Chip Curry (Incumbent)	13,761	56.08
Republican	Sean Paul Hinkley	10,775	43.92
Total votes		24,536	100.00
Democratic hold			

=== District 12 ===
12th District Democratic primary details

Democratic Primary, 12th District
Party	Candidate	Votes	%
Democratic	Pinny Beebe-Center (Incumbent)	Unopposed	
Total votes		3,659	100.0

12th District Republican primary details

Republican Primary, 12th District
Party	Candidate	Votes	%
Republican	William Scott Rocknak	Unopposed	
Total votes		2,004	100.0

2024 Maine Senate election, 12th District
Party	Candidate	Votes	%
Democratic	Pinny Beebe-Center (Incumbent)	14,344	58.97
Republican	William Scott Rocknak	9,979	41.03
Total votes		24,323	100.00
Democratic hold			

=== District 13 ===
13th District Democratic primary details

Democratic Primary, 13th District
Party	Candidate	Votes	%
Democratic	Cameron Reny (Incumbent)	Unopposed	
Total votes		2,763	100.0

13th District Republican primary details

Republican Primary, 13th District
Party	Candidate	Votes	%
Republican	Dale C. Harmon	Unopposed	
Total votes		2,218	100.0

2024 Maine Senate election, 13th District
Party	Candidate	Votes	%
Democratic	Cameron Reny (Incumbent)	13,896	55.50
Republican	Dale C. Harmon	11,143	44.50
Total votes		25,039	100.00
Democratic hold			

=== District 14 ===
14th District Democratic primary details

Democratic Primary, 14th District
Party	Candidate	Votes	%
Democratic	Craig Hickman (Incumbent)	Unopposed	
Total votes		1,777	100.0

14th District Republican primary details

Republican Primary, 14th District
Party	Candidate	Votes	%
Republican	Shannon McDonnell	Unopposed	
Total votes		1,867	100.0

2024 Maine Senate election, 14th District
Party	Candidate	Votes	%
Democratic	Craig Hickman (Incumbent)	12,763	52.62
Republican	Shannon McDonnell	11,491	47.38
Total votes		24,254	100.00
Democratic hold			

=== District 15 ===
15th District Democratic primary details

Democratic Primary, 15th District
Party	Candidate	Votes	%
Democratic	Raegen French LaRochelle	Unopposed	
Total votes		1,156	100.0

15th District Republican primary details

Republican Primary, 15th District
Party	Candidate	Votes	%
Republican	Richard Bradstreet	Unopposed	
Total votes		1,379	100.0

2024 Maine Senate election, 15th District
Party	Candidate	Votes	%
Republican	Richard Bradstreet	10,820	50.46
Democratic	Raegen French LaRochelle	10,621	49.54
Total votes		21,441	100.00
Republican hold			

=== District 16 ===
16th District Democratic primary details

Democratic Primary, 16th District
Party	Candidate	Votes	%
Democratic	David P. LaFountain	Unopposed	
Total votes		2,031	100.0

16th District Republican primary details

Republican Primary, 16th District
Party	Candidate	Votes	%
Republican	Scott Cyrway	Unopposed	
Total votes		1,105	100.0

2024 Maine Senate election, 16th District
Party	Candidate	Votes	%
Republican	Scott Cyrway	10,806	53.73
Democratic	Nate White	9,305	46.27
Total votes		20,111	100.00
Republican gain from Democratic			

=== District 17 ===
17th District Democratic primary details

Democratic Primary, 17th District
Party	Candidate	Votes	%
Democratic	Thomas Riley Watson	Unopposed	
Total votes		805	100.0

17th District Republican primary details

Republican Primary, 17th District
Party	Candidate	Votes	%
Republican	Jeff Timberlake (Incumbent)	Unopposed	
Total votes		2,184	100.0

2024 Maine Senate election, 17th District
Party	Candidate	Votes	%
Republican	Jeff Timberlake (Incumbent)	14,751	67.80
Democratic	Thomas Riley Watson	7,005	32.20
Total votes		21,756	100.00
Republican hold			

=== District 18 ===
18th District Democratic primary details

Democratic Primary, 18th District
Party	Candidate	Votes	%
Democratic	Linda Kay Miller	Unopposed	
Total votes		1,521	100.0

18th District Republican primary details

Republican Primary, 18th District
Party	Candidate	Votes	%
Republican	Richard Bennett (Incumbent)	Unopposed	
Total votes		2,673	100.0

2024 Maine Senate election, 18th District
Party	Candidate	Votes	%
Republican	Richard Bennett (Incumbent)	15,206	64.66
Democratic	Linda Kay Miller	8,310	35.34
Total votes		23,516	100.00
Republican hold			

=== District 19 ===
19th District Democratic primary details

Democratic Primary, 19th District
Party	Candidate	Votes	%
Democratic	Bruce S. Bryant	Unopposed	
Total votes		1,603	100.0

19th District Republican primary details

Republican Primary, 19th District
Party	Candidate	Votes	%
Republican	Joseph E. Martin	1,607	50.92
Republican	David A. Duguay	1,549	49.08
Total votes		3,156	100.00

2024 Maine Senate election, 19th District
Party	Candidate	Votes	%
Republican	Joseph E. Martin	12,901	56.85
Democratic	Bruce S. Bryant	9,793	43.15
Total votes		22,694	100.00
Republican hold			

=== District 20 ===
20th District Democratic primary details

Democratic Primary, 20th District
Party	Candidate	Votes	%
Democratic	Bettyann W. Sheats	Unopposed	
Total votes		1,453	100.0

20th District Republican primary details

Republican Primary, 20th District
Party	Candidate	Votes	%
Republican	Bruce Bickford	Unopposed	
Total votes		1,793	100.0

2024 Maine Senate election, 20th District
Party	Candidate	Votes	%
Republican	Bruce Bickford	11,174	52.31
Democratic	Bettyann W. Sheats	10,187	47.69
Total votes		21,361	100.00
Republican hold			

=== District 21 ===
21st District Democratic primary details

Democratic Primary, 21st District
Party	Candidate	Votes	%
Democratic	Peggy Rotundo (Incumbent)	Unopposed	
Total votes		1,285	100.0

21st District Republican primary details

Republican Primary, 21st District
Party	Candidate	Votes	%
Republican	Jonathan M. Connor	Unopposed	
Total votes		1,233	100.0

2024 Maine Senate election, 21st District
Party	Candidate	Votes	%
Democratic	Peggy Rotundo (Incumbent)	Unopposed	
Total votes		12,599	100.0

=== District 22 ===
22nd District Democratic primary details

Democratic Primary, 22nd District
Party	Candidate	Votes	%
Democratic	Anne Marie McMahon	Unopposed	
Total votes		1,300	100.0

22nd District Republican primary details

Republican Primary, 22nd District
Party	Candidate	Votes	%
Republican	James Libby (Incumbent)	Unopposed	
Total votes		1,944	100.0

2024 Maine Senate election, 22nd District
Party	Candidate	Votes	%
Republican	James Libby (Incumbent)	14,838	63.58
Democratic	Anne Marie McMahon	8,501	36.42
Total votes		23,339	100.00
Republican hold			

=== District 23 ===
23rd District Democratic primary details

Democratic Primary, 23rd District
Party	Candidate	Votes	%
Democratic	Mattie Daughtry (Incumbent)	Unopposed	
Total votes		3,064	100.0

23rd District Republican primary details

Republican Primary, 23rd District
Party	Candidate	Votes	%
Republican	Michael J. Lawler	Unopposed	
Total votes		1,216	100.0

2024 Maine Senate election, 23rd District
Party	Candidate	Votes	%
Democratic	Mattie Daughtry (Incumbent)	18,898	69.00
Republican	Michael J. Lawler	8,489	31.00
Total votes		27,387	100.00
Democratic hold			

=== District 24 ===
24th District Democratic primary details

Democratic Primary, 24th District
Party	Candidate	Votes	%
Democratic	Denise Tepler	1,824	50.35
Democratic	Jean M. Guzzetti	1,799	49.65
Total votes		3,623	100.00

24th District Republican primary details

Republican Primary, 24th District
Party	Candidate	Votes	%
Republican	Jeffrey K. Pierce	Unopposed	
Total votes		1,960	100.0

2024 Maine Senate election, 24th District
Party	Candidate	Votes	%
Democratic	Denise Tepler (Incumbent)	13,406	53.09
Republican	Jeffrey K. Pierce	10,320	40.87
Independent	Suzanne Andresen	1,525	6.04
Total votes		25,251	100.00
Democratic hold			

=== District 25 ===
25th District Democratic primary details

Democratic Primary, 25th District
Party	Candidate	Votes	%
Democratic	Teresa Pierce (Incumbent)	Unopposed	
Total votes		4,970	100.0

25th District Republican primary details

Republican Primary, 25th District
Party	Candidate	Votes	%
Republican	James Read	Unopposed	
Total votes		2,508	100.0

2024 Maine Senate election, 25th District
Party	Candidate	Votes	%
Democratic	Teresa Pierce (Incumbent)	17,896	64.53
Republican	James Read	9,835	35.47
Total votes		27,731	100.00
Democratic hold			

=== District 26 ===
26th District Democratic primary details

Democratic Primary, 26th District
Party	Candidate	Votes	%
Democratic	Tim Nangle (Incumbent)	Unopposed	
Total votes		1,355	100.0

26th District Republican primary details

Republican Primary, 26th District
Party	Candidate	Votes	%
Republican	Kenneth J. Cianchette	Unopposed	
Total votes		1,345	100.0

2024 Maine Senate election, 26th District
Party	Candidate	Votes	%
Democratic	Tim Nangle (Incumbent)	12,124	52.03
Republican	Kenneth J. Cianchette	11,177	47.97
Total votes		23,301	100.00
Democratic hold			

=== District 27 ===
27th District Democratic primary details

Democratic Primary, 27th District
Party	Candidate	Votes	%
Democratic	Jill Duson (Incumbent)	1,850	89.33
Democratic	Kenneth A. Capron	221	10.67
Total votes		2,071	100.00

27th District Republican primary details

Republican Primary, 27th District
Party	Candidate	Votes	%
Republican	Dale Jay Holman	Unopposed	
Total votes		502	100.0

2024 Maine Senate election, 27th District
Party	Candidate	Votes	%
Democratic	Jill Duson (Incumbent)	16,500	73.19
Republican	Dale Jay Holman	4,876	22.81
Total votes		21,376	100.00
Democratic hold			

=== District 28 ===
28th District Democratic primary details

Democratic Primary, 28th District
Party	Candidate	Votes	%
Democratic	Rachel Talbot Ross (Incumbent)	Unopposed	
Total votes		1,848	100.0

28th District Republican primary details

Republican Primary, 28th District
Party	Candidate	Votes	%
Republican	Susan M. Abercrombie	Unopposed	
Total votes		232	100.0

2024 Maine Senate election, 28th District
Party	Candidate	Votes	%
Democratic	Rachel Talbot Ross (Incumbent)	18,254	83.41
Republican	Susan M. Abercrombie	3,631	16.59
Total votes		21,885	100.00
Democratic hold			

=== District 29 ===
29th District Democratic primary details

Democratic Primary, 29th District
Party	Candidate	Votes	%
Democratic	Anne Carney (Incumbent)	Unopposed	
Total votes		2,913	100.0

29th District Republican primary details

Republican Primary, 29th District
Party	Candidate	Votes	%
Republican	Christopher M. Howell	Unopposed	
Total votes		730	100.0

2024 Maine Senate election, 29th District
Party	Candidate	Votes	%
Democratic	Anne Carney (Incumbent)	17,518	74.86
Republican	Christopher M. Howell	5,884	25.14
Total votes		23,402	100.00
Democratic hold			

=== District 30 ===
30th District Democratic primary details

Democratic Primary, 30th District
Party	Candidate	Votes	%
Democratic	Stacy Brenner (Incumbent)	Unopposed	
Total votes		3,186	100.0

30th District Republican primary details

Republican Primary, 30th District
Party	Candidate	Votes	%
Republican	Donald R. Hamill	Unopposed	
Total votes		1,940	100.0

2024 Maine Senate election, 30th District
Party	Candidate	Votes	%
Democratic	Stacy Brenner (Incumbent)	15,021	60.33
Republican	Donald R. Hamill	9,875	39.67
Total votes		24,896	100.00
Democratic hold			

=== District 31 ===
31st District Democratic primary details

Democratic Primary, 31st District
Party	Candidate	Votes	%
Democratic	Donna Bailey (Incumbent)	Unopposed	
Total votes		2,617	100.0

2024 Maine Senate election, 31st District
Party	Candidate	Votes	%
Democratic	Donna Bailey (Incumbent)	13,107	57.66
Republican	James A. McCarthy	9,624	42.34
Total votes		22,731	100.00
Democratic hold			

=== District 32 ===
32nd District Democratic primary details

Democratic Primary, 32nd District
Party	Candidate	Votes	%
Democratic	Henry Ingwersen (Incumbent)	Unopposed	
Total votes		1,423	100.0

32nd District Republican primary details

Republican Primary, 31st District
Party	Candidate	Votes	%
Republican	James A. McCarthy	Unopposed	
Total votes		1,173	100.0

2024 Maine Senate election, 32nd District
Party	Candidate	Votes	%
Democratic	Henry Ingwersen (Incumbent)	12,262	58.42
Republican	James A. McCarthy	8,729	41.58
Total votes		20,991	100.00
Democratic hold			

=== District 33 ===
33rd District Democratic primary details

Democratic Primary, 33rd District
Party	Candidate	Votes	%
Democratic	Daniel J. Lauzon	Unopposed	
Total votes		1,300	100.0

33rd District Republican primary details

Republican Primary, 33rd District
Party	Candidate	Votes	%
Republican	Matthew Harrington (politician) (Incumbent)	Unopposed	
Total votes		1,400	100.0

2024 Maine Senate election, 33rd District
Party	Candidate	Votes	%
Republican	Matthew Harrington (politician) (Incumbent)	12,432	60.62
Democratic	Daniel J. Lauzon	8,076	39.38
Total votes		20,508	100.00
Republican hold			

=== District 34 ===
34th District Democratic primary details

Democratic Primary, 34th District
Party	Candidate	Votes	%
Democratic	Joe Rafferty (Incumbent)	Unopposed	
Total votes		3,350	100.0

34th District Republican primary details

Republican Primary, 34th District
Party	Candidate	Votes	%
Republican	Bradley Scott Ducharme	Unopposed	
Total votes		2,418	100.0

2024 Maine Senate election, 34th District
Party	Candidate	Votes	%
Democratic	Joe Rafferty (Incumbent)	15,064	55.78
Republican	Bradley Scott Ducharme	11,941	44.22
Total votes		27,005	100.00
Democratic hold			

=== District 35 ===
35th District Democratic primary details

Democratic Primary, 35th District
Party	Candidate	Votes	%
Democratic	Mark Lawrence (Incumbent)	Unopposed	
Total votes		2,552	100.0

35th District Republican primary details

Republican Primary, 35th District
Party	Candidate	Votes	%
Republican	Julie N. Rakic	Unopposed	
Total votes		1,333	100.0

2024 Maine Senate election, 35th District
Party	Candidate	Votes	%
Democratic	Mark Lawrence (Incumbent)	16,491	63.56
Republican	Julie N. Rakic	9,453	36.44
Total votes		25,944	100.00
Democratic hold			

== See also ==
- 2024 Maine House of Representatives election
- List of Maine state legislatures
