= Aaron Frey =

American lawyer and politician

58th Attorney General of Maine
- Incumbent
- Assumed office January 2, 2019
- Governor: Janet Mills
- Preceded by: Janet Mills

Member of the Maine House of Representatives
- In office December 3, 2014 – December 5, 2018
- Preceded by: Bryan Kaenrath
- Succeeded by: Joe Perry
- Constituency: 124th district
- In office December 5, 2012 – December 3, 2014
- Preceded by: James W. Parker
- Succeeded by: Anne-Marie Mastraccio
- Constituency: 18th district

Personal details
- Born: 1978 or 1979 (age 46–47) Bangor, Maine, U.S.
- Party: Democratic
- Education: Saint Anselm College (BA); Roger Williams University (JD)

Aaron M. Frey (born 1978/1979) is an American lawyer and politician serving as the 58th Attorney General of Maine since 2019. He formerly served as a Democratic Party representative in the Maine House of Representatives.

== Early life and education ==
Frey was born and raised in Dixmont, Maine. He is the son of Michael Frey and Cynthia Bean-Frey. Frey attended Saint Anselm College, where he served as student body president. He graduated from Saint Anselm with a Bachelor's degree in politics, and later received a Juris Doctor degree from Roger Williams University School of Law.

== Career ==
He started a law firm in Bangor. In 2012 he was elected to the Maine House of Representatives. From December 2014 until his resignation, he represented the 124th district, which included parts of Bangor and Orono.

== Maine Attorney General ==
In December 2018, Democrats in the Maine Legislature chose Frey as their nominee for Maine Attorney General. Upon his nomination, he resigned his house seat to comply with a constitutional provision that prohibits state legislators from being elected to higher offices. He succeeded Janet Mills, who was elected Governor of Maine.

Upon taking office, Frey stated that he would consider involving Maine in multi-state lawsuits against pharmaceutical companies. He later joined a lawsuit accusing drug manufacturers of price inflation.

In February 2019, Frey became one of 16 state attorney generals to join a lawsuit against the Trump administration over Trump's decision to declare a national emergency. The emergency declaration was made to allow the President to allocate funding for a wall on the United States-Mexico border.

In April 2023, Frey announced that he was in a romantic relationship with an employee under his direct supervision in the Attorney General's Office and called it "an error in judgment" to not reassign the employee to a new supervisor. In an email to office staff, Frey identified the employee as an Assistant Attorney General and disclosed that the relationship had begun in August 2022. The revelation was made after the Bangor Daily News began investigating tips about Frey's relationship. After publicly disclosing the relationship, he transferred supervision of the person to chief deputy attorney general Christopher Taub. An independent workplace assessment report found no fault with how the Attorney General's Office handled the situation.

He was reelected in 2024.

Legal offices
| Preceded by Janet Mills | Attorney General of Maine; 2019–present | Incumbent |
