= Hermon High School =

Location
- 2415 Route 2 Hermon, Maine 04401; United States
- Coordinates: 44°48′35″N 68°53′57″W

Information
- Type: Public high school
- School district: Hermon Public Schools
- NCES School ID: 230651000281
- Principal: Brian M. Walsh
- Teaching staff: 38.70 (on an FTE basis)
- Grades: 9–12
- Enrollment: 567 (2023-2024)
- Student to teacher ratio: 14.65
- Campus type: Rural
- Colors: Blue and Gold
- Mascot: Hawk
- Accreditation: New England Association of Schools and Colleges
- Newspaper: The Hermon Press
- Website: www.hhs.hermon.net/o/hhs

Hermon High School is a public high school in Hermon, Maine, United States. It is part of the Hermon Public Schools district and has been accredited by the New England Association of Schools and Colleges.

== History ==
Hermon High School is a two-story building that was completed in 1995.

The 2008–2009 Cheerleading team swept all four competitions held in Maine, winning first at PVC's, Big East, Regionals and States. They placed sixth in the New England Cheerleading Competition.

The 2017-2018 Boys Basketball team won the State Championship defeating Wells 55–34.

== Notable alumni ==
- Dana White, businessman and the current president of the Ultimate Fighting Championship (UFC)

== Links ==
- History of Hermon High School on School Website: Official History page of High School (Updated up to 2007)
