= James Libby =

American politician

Jim Libby

Member of the Maine Senate from the 22nd district
- Incumbent
- Assumed office December 7, 2022
- Preceded by: William Diamond

Member of the Maine Senate from the 34th district
- In office December 4, 1996 – December 6, 2000
- Preceded by: Willis Lord
- Succeeded by: Michael McAlevey

Member of the Maine House of Representatives
- In office December 7, 1994 – December 4, 1996
- Preceded by: Charles Plourde
- Succeeded by: John Vedral
- Constituency: 14th district
- In office December 2, 1992 – December 7, 1994
- Preceded by: Merton Waterman
- Succeeded by: Guy Nadeau
- Constituency: 16th district

Personal details
- Born: James Delmas Libby; November 14, 1960 (age 65) Saco, Maine, U.S.
- Party: Republican
- Spouse: Jennifer Peternel
- Education: Nasson College (BS); St. Bonaventure University (MBA); University of Maine (CAS, PhD)

James Delmas Libby (born November 14, 1960) is an American politician, college professor and author from the state of Maine. A Republican, he served as a member the Maine House of Representatives from 1992 to 1996, then as a member of the Maine Senate from 1996 to 2000, before losing the 2002 Republican gubernatorial nomination to Peter Cianchette. Libby was the first candidate in the United States to qualify for a gubernatorial campaign as a "clean elections" candidate. He ran for the Maine House of Representatives in 2010, but lost the general election to the eventual Clerk of the Maine House of Representatives, Robert Hunt.

He returned to the Maine Senate in 2022 to represent the 22nd district. The district includes parts of Cumberland, Oxford, and York counties. He was re-elected in 2024.

He was a candidate for Governor of Maine in the 2026 election, but dropped out of the race before the primary after failing to qualify for clean elections financing for his campaign.

Libby has authored several books and articles, including "Super U: The History and Politics of the University of Maine System, and "Buxton, A Postcard History." He has been appointed to several board and commissions by Republican, Democrat, and Independent governors, including as a trustee of the Maine Community College System. He resides in Standish, Maine, with his wife, Jennifer (Peternel) Libby, daughter Grace, and son Brett.

== Committees ==
Libby currently serves on two committees: the committee on Education and Cultural Affairs, and the committee on Senate Conduct and Ethics.
