= Wayne Parry =

American politician

Wayne R. Parry

Member of the Maine House of Representatives
- Incumbent
- Assumed office December 7, 2022
- Preceded by: Anne C. Perry
- Constituency: 140th district
- In office December 2, 2020 – December 7, 2022
- Preceded by: Henry Ingwersen
- Succeeded by: Kenneth Davis Jr.
- Constituency: 10th district
- In office December 1, 2010 – December 5, 2018
- Preceded by: Gary Connor
- Succeeded by: Henry Ingwersen
- Constituency: 10th district

Personal details
- Born: May 15, 1963 (age 63) Portland, Maine
- Party: Republican
- Education: Windham High School

Wayne R. Parry is an American politician from Maine. A Republican, Parry represented District 10 in the Maine House of Representatives from 2010 to 2018, when he could not run again due to term limits. He ran unsuccessfully in 2008. In 2020, he filed to run for his old seat, against incumbent Democratic Representative Henry Ingwersen.

Maine House of Representatives
Preceded by Gary Connor	Member of the Maine House of Representatives from the 140th district 2010–2014	Succeeded by Joyce Maker
Preceded by Stephen Stanley	Member of the Maine House of Representatives from the 10th district 2014–2018	Succeeded by Henry Ingwersen
Preceded by Henry Ingwersen	Member of the Maine House of Representatives from the 10th district 2020–2022	Succeeded by Kenneth Davis Jr.
Preceded by Anne C. Perry	Member of the Maine House of Representatives from the 140th district 2022–present	Incumbent
