= List of mayors of Bangor, Maine =

The following is a list of mayors of the city of Bangor, Maine, United States.

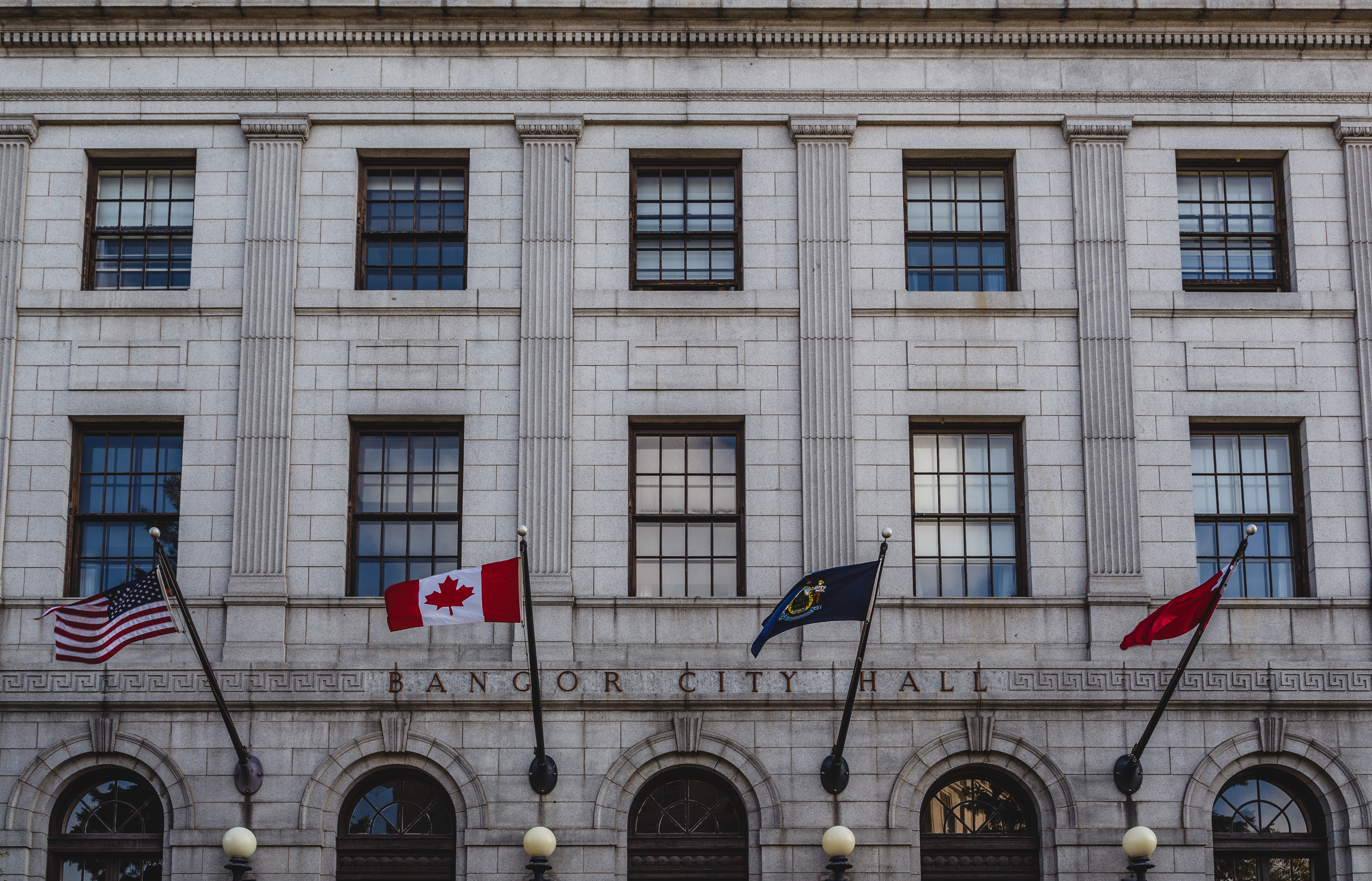
Bangor City Hall building, Maine, 2014

- Allen Gilman, 1834–1835
- Edward Kent, 1836–1837
- Rufus Dwinel, 1838
- J. Wingate Carr, 1839–1840
- Bradford Harlow, 1841–1843
- Jacob Drummond, 1844
- Joseph Bryant, 1845–1846
- Charles Hayward, 1847
- William Abbott, 1848–1849
- William H. Mills, 1850
- Elijah Hamlin, 1851–1852
- George W Pickering, 1853–1854
- John T. K. Hayward, 1855
- Hollis Bowman, 1856–1858
- Isaiah Stetson, 1859–1862
- Samuel H. Dale, 1863–1865
- Albert O. Wakefield, 1866–1867
- Augustus D. Manson, 1868
- Samuel D. Thurston, 1869
- Henry E. Prentiss, 1870
- Samuel H. Dale, 1871
- Jos. S. Wheelwright, 1872
- Joseph P. Bass, 1873
- Newell Blake, 1874
- Fred'k M. Laughton, 1875
- William B. Hayford, 1876
- Augustus C. Hamlin, 1877–1878
- William H. Brown, 1879–1880
- Lysander Strickland, 1881–1882
- Fred'k A. Cummings, 1883
- Samuel F. Humphrey, 1884
- Edward B. Nealley, 1885–1886
- Charles F. Bragg, 1887–1889
- Edward H. Blake, 1890
- Joseph F. Snow, 1891
- Flavius O. Beal, 1892–1894, 1896–1898, 1903–1904, 1913
- Chas. L. Snow, 1895
- Arthur Chapin, 1899–1901
- William Engel, 1902
- William B. Peirce, 1905–1906
- John F. Woodman, 1907–1910, 1916–1919
- Charles W. Mullen, 1911–1912
- John G. Utterback, 1914
- Frank Robinson, 1915
- Jarvis B. Woods, c. 1920–21
- Albert R. Day, c. 1922–1923
- Charles D. Crosby, c. 1924–1926
- John Wilson, c. 1927–1929
- Benjamin W. Blanchard, c. 1930
- Norman E. Whitney, c. 1931
- John Flaherty, c. 1953
- William S. Cohen, 1971–1972
- Mary Sullivan, 1988-1989
- Tom Sawyer, 1989
- John Cashwell, c. 2006
- Nichi Farnham, c. 2007
- Richard Stone, c. 2009–2010
- Cary Weston, 2011–2012
- Nelson Durgin, 2012–2013
- Nelson Durgin, 2014–2015
- Sarah Nichols, c. 2018- 2019
- Clare Davitt c. 2019 - 2020
- Cara Pelletier, c. 2023–2025

== See also ==
- Bangor history
