= Joe Baldacci =

American politician (born 1965)

Member of the Maine Senate from the 9th district
- Incumbent
- Assumed office December 2, 2020
- Preceded by: Geoffrey Gratwick

Personal details
- Born: February 21, 1965 (age 61) Bangor, Maine, U.S.
- Party: Democratic
- Spouse: Elizabeth Baldacci
- Children: 2
- Relatives: John Baldacci (brother)
- Education: University of Maine (BA, JD)

Joseph Baldacci (born February 21, 1965) is an American attorney and Democratic politician from Maine. Baldacci serves in the Maine Senate representing District 9, serving Bangor and Hermon. Baldacci first served on the Bangor City Council beginning in 1996, serving 12 years in total on the council, including two terms as chair/mayor, before being elected to the Maine Senate in 2020. He also made a brief run for Maine's 2nd congressional district seat in 2016 but dropped out before the Democratic primary. In 2026, Baldacci was again a candidate in the Democratic primary for Maine's 2nd Congressional District 2026 election. Throughout the primary season, Baldacci was leading in most polls and, in May, he was endorsed by the Democratic Congressional Campaign Committee. At the time, some pundits argued the early endorsement might backfire, and some local Democrats complained about what some considered interference from the national party.

In June 9th's primary, Baldacci won a plurality of the four-way race and 31.6% of the vote. However, Maine is the only state that uses instant runoff voting in primaries, so a plurality in first preferences is not sufficient to win. After all other candidates were eliminated, Baldacci finished second to Maine state auditor Matt Dunlap.

== Early life and education ==
Baldacci was born in Bangor and grew up there, working in his family's restaurant, Momma Baldacci's, with his seven siblings. His father served on the Bangor City Council. Baldacci attended the University of Maine and graduated in 1987 with a Bachelor of Arts in political science, continuing to the University of Maine School of Law, where he completed his Juris Doctor in 1991. While at Maine Law, Baldacci co-founded the Maine Association for Public Interest Law (MAPIL) to help provide scholarships for law students pursuing public interest law opportunities, an organization that is still granting scholarships today.

== Law career and political office ==
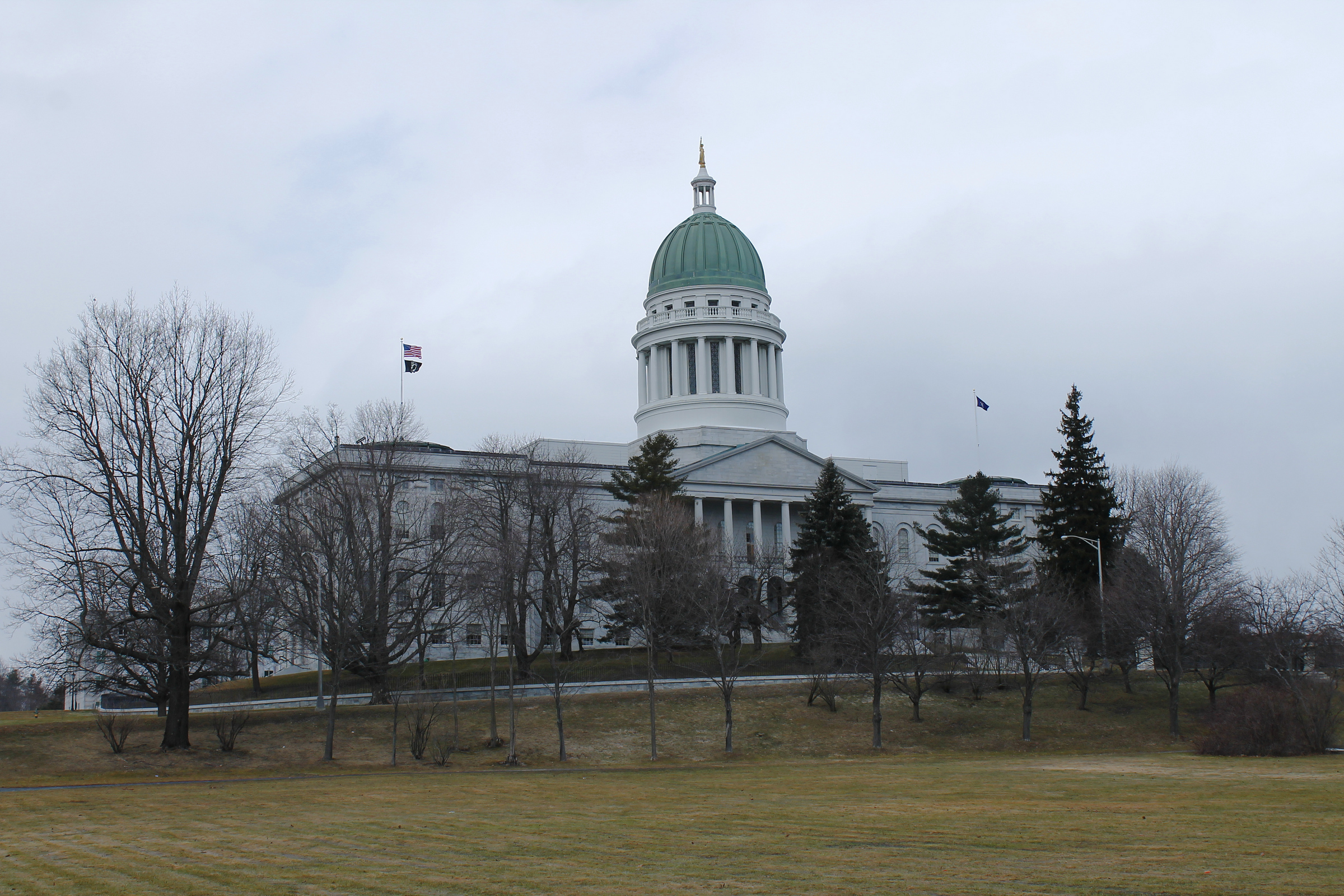
Baldacci was elected to the Maine Senate in 2020.

Following law school, Baldacci returned to Bangor and started a law practice. He was first elected to the Bangor City Council in 1996 and re-elected in 1999, also serving a term as City Council chairman and Mayor — in Bangor, these two titles belong to one position — and remaining on the council until 2002.

Baldacci was elected to the City Council again in 2011 in a race that also unseated two incumbents, and was re-elected in 2014.

In July 2015, Baldacci announced that he would run for the Democratic nomination for Maine's 2nd congressional district, challenging incumbent Republican Bruce Poliquin. He dropped out in February 2016 and endorsed fellow Democrat Emily Cain for the nomination. Baldacci was again elected City Council chairman and mayor of Bangor in November 2016.

In a 2021 interview, Baldacci recalls deciding during his final term as City Councilor that he would run for the Maine Senate. He explained that his experiences navigating and becoming familiar with local policies over his 12 years on the council had helped him feel prepared for the position, and that his daughters were in college by then, making the increased time commitment more feasible for his family.

In 2020, Baldacci ran for the Maine Senate District 9 seat vacated by term-limited incumbent Geoffrey Gratwick. In the Democratic primary, he defeated Victoria Kornfield 53%–47%, and in the November general election he received 55% of the vote in the three-way race with Republican Sean Hinkley and independent Kristie Miner. Since his 2020 term began, Baldacci has served on the Health and Human Services committee and is the chair of State and Local Government committee. Baldacci was reelected in 2022, with 59% of the vote, and again in 2024 with 58% of the vote.

On January 12, 2026, Baldacci announced his candidacy for Maine's 2nd congressional district after incumbent Democrat Jared Golden announced his decision not to run for a fifth term. Ultimately, in the second round of ranked voting, Baldacci finished second to Maine state auditor Matt Dunlap.

== Personal life ==
Baldacci lives in Bangor with his wife, Elizabeth, who is also an attorney. The couple has two adult daughters. Baldacci and his brother John Baldacci, a former U.S. Congressman and governor, frequently hold spaghetti dinners to support local needs and causes.

== Electoral record ==
2020 Maine Senate District 9 Democratic primary
Party	Candidate	Votes	%
Democratic	Joe Baldacci	2,065	52.8%
Democratic	Victoria Kornfield	1,847	47.2%
Total votes		3,912	100.0%

2020 Maine Senate District 9 general election
Party	Candidate	Votes	%
Democratic	Joe Baldacci	10,960	55.0%
Republican	Sean Hinkley	6,706	33.7%
Independent	Kristie Miner	2,248	11.3%
Total votes		19,914	100.0%

Maine Senate District 9 general election, 2022
Party	Candidate	Votes	%
Democratic	Joe Baldacci (incumbent)	9,070	59%
Republican	Suzette Furrow	6,265	41%
Total votes		15,335	100%

2024 Maine Senate election, 9th District
Party	Candidate	Votes	%
Democratic	Joe Baldacci (Incumbent)	11,601	58.60
Republican	Sean Paul Hinkley	8,196	41.40
Total votes		19,797	100.00
Democratic hold			
