= Gary Connor =

American politician (born 1972)

Member of Maine House of Representatives for District 140
- In office 2006–2010
- Succeeded by: Wayne Parry

Personal details
- Born: November 23, 1972 (age 53)
- Party: Democratic

Gary Connor (born November 23, 1972) is an American politician. He was a member of the Maine House of Representatives from 2006 to 2010.

Connor previously served as Treasurer of the Kennebunk Democratic Committee.
