= Ecotat Gardens and Arboretum =

Gardens and arboretum in Hermon, Maine, United States

- Location within Maine
- Location: 25 Annis Rd
- Nearest town: Hermon, Maine
- Coordinates: 44°48′37″N 68°55′28″W
- Area: 88 acres
- Website: https://hermonme.myrec.com/info/default.aspx

Ecotat Gardens and Arboretum is an 88-acre (36 ha) non-profit gardens and arboretum located on Route 2 in Hermon, Maine, United States. It is home to over 55 gardens containing over 1500 herbaceous species and 130 woody species, including a 3/4 mile trail highlighting selected native trees, including mature stands of Eastern White Pine, White Spruce, Tamarack Larch, Northern White Cypress, Red oak, White Ash, red maple, and Quaking Aspen

It is open to the public without charge during daylight hours for tours, hikes, and cross-country skiing.

== See also ==
- List of botanical gardens in the United States
