= Tom Sawyer (Maine politician) =

American politician and businessperson

Member of the Maine Senate from the 32nd district
- In office 2000–2004
- Preceded by: Robert Murray
- Succeeded by: Joe Perry

Personal details
- Born: March 17, 1949 (age 77) Bangor, Maine
- Party: Republican
- Profession: Businessperson

W. Tom Sawyer, Jr. (born March 17, 1949) is an American politician and businessperson from Maine. A Republican, Sawyer represented Bangor, Maine in the Maine Senate from 2000 to 2004, when he was defeated for re-election by Democrat Joe Perry.

He served on the Bangor City Council from 1986 to 1993, including a year (1989) as the ceremonial mayor.

While campaigning for the State Senate in 2002, Sawyer said his top priorities were "the economy, the environment and education", including lower taxes for businesses.

A businessperson, Sawyer has been an investor and partner in a number of ventures, including Bangor Historic Raceway, Turtle Head Marina, and Southwest Harbor Boat Marina.

== See also ==
- List of mayors of Bangor, Maine
