= Bryan Kaenrath =

American politician (born 1983)

Bryan T. Kaenrath

Member of the Maine House of Representatives for the 124th District
- In office December 2006 – December 2014
- Preceded by: Kevin Glynn
- Succeeded by: Kevin Battle

Personal details
- Born: 1983 (age 42–43)
- Party: Democratic
- Education: University of Maine; Johns Hopkins University

Bryan T. Kaenrath (born 1983) is an American politician from Maine. Kaenrath graduated from the University of Maine in 2006 and was elected to the Maine House of Representatives that year representing the western end of South Portland. He was re-elected in 2010 for his 3rd term.

In January 2012, Kaenrath announced his candidacy for the Maine Senate District 7. Cynthia Dill vacated the seat in order to run for the United States Senate. Kaenrath lost the Democratic primary to Rebecca Millett but was chosen as a replacement candidate for his former house seat, which he won re-election to for a fourth time. He was unable to seek re-election in 2014 due to term-limits and was replaced by his 2012 opponent, Republican Kevin Battle.

In July 2015, Kaenrath became the town manager of Gouldsboro, Maine, and he served for almost three years. In March 2018, he became the town administrator of North Hampton, New Hampshire. As of January 1, 2020, Kaenrath is the City Administrator of Saco, Maine.
