= Nichi Farnham =

American politician

Nichi S. Farnham

Member of the Maine Senate from the 32nd district
- In office December 1, 2010 – December 5, 2012
- Preceded by: Joe Perry
- Succeeded by: Geoffrey Gratwick

Personal details
- Born: Rugby, North Dakota
- Party: Democratic
- Spouse: Doug Farnham
- Website: Official Website

Nichi S. Farnham is an American politician from Maine. Farnham served as a Republican State Senator from Maine's 32nd District, representing the city of Bangor and the neighboring town of Hermon from 2010 to 2012. She was first elected to the Maine State Senate in 2010 after serving as a City Councilor and Mayor of Bangor. She obtained a B.A. from the United States Air Force Academy and a master's degree in human resources management from Webster University. In 2012, Farnham was defeated in a hotly contested re-election bid by Democrat Geoffrey Gratwick.

In February 2012, Republican Governor Paul LePage appointed Farnham to the Maine State Board of Education.

== Family ==
Nichi S. Farnham is married to Doug and has three children. Nichi Farnham is a Lutheran.

== Politics ==
Farnham served on the Bangor City Council from 1997 to 2010, including as mayor of Bangor from 2007 until her election to the Maine State Senate in 2010. She defeated three-term incumbent Joe Perry with 54% of the vote. Nichi Farnham was a member of the Health and Human Services and Chair of the Veterans and Legal Affairs.

== See also ==
- List of mayors of Bangor, Maine
