= Cathy Breen =

American politician from Falmouth, Maine

Member of the Maine Senate from the 25th district
- In office December 3, 2014 – December 7, 2022
- Preceded by: Richard G. Woodbury
- Succeeded by: Teresa Pierce

Personal details
- Born: 1965 (age 60–61)
- Party: Democratic
- Spouse: Jay Geller
- Education: Tufts University (BA); University of Illinois, Chicago (MEd)

Catherine E. Breen (born 1965) is an American Democratic politician from Maine. Breen, a Falmouth resident, served four terms representing Senate District 25, which includes the towns of Falmouth, Cumberland, Yarmouth, Gray, Long Island, Chebeague Island and part of Westbrook. Before moving to Maine in 2000, Breen was elected in Illinois to serve as a commissioner on the Oak Park, Illinois Park District Board from 1997-2000.

== Early life and education ==
Breen earned a Bachelor of Arts in history and political science from Tufts University and a Master of Education from the University of Illinois at Chicago. She has worked as a middle school teacher and has lived in the greater Portland, Maine, area since 2000.

Breen has served on the Board of Directors of Community Counseling Center and has served on the Spurwink Board of Directors since 2013. She is also a graduate of the Institute for Civic Leadership's collaborative leadership training program.

== Political career ==
Breen was first elected to public office in Illinois, serving on the Park District Board, in Oak Park, Illinois. She held office in Illinois from 1997-2000.

Breen was the Falmouth representative to the Greater Portland Council of Governments, a group of town leaders from 30 municipalities in the Portland area, for six years. She served on the Falmouth Town Council from 2005 until she termed out in 2011, including two years as chairwoman.

=== Maine State Senate ===
In 2014, Breen ran for the seat being vacated by independent Richard G. Woodbury, who did not seek re-election. In the general election, Breen was declared the narrow winner on election night. Her opponent, Republican Cathleen Manchester, requested a recount, after which Manchester was declared the narrow winner. On December 3, Manchester was provisionally seated by the Senate. On December 9, a Senate committee inspection invalidated 21 "phantom ballots" that had been discovered on election night for Manchester. Manchester immediately resigned and Breen was certified the winner.

In 2015, Breen was named Legislator of the Year by the Maine chapter of the American Academy of Pediatrics.

Breen ran unopposed in the Democratic primary races in 2016, 2018 and 2020. In the 2016 general election, she defeated Republican Charles “Bart” Ladd 58%-42%. In 2018, she won over Republican Cathy Nichols 62%-38%, and in 2020 she defeated Republican Jennifer White 62%-38%.

Breen served on the Legislature's Environment and Natural Resources Committee. and as the Senate chair of the Appropriations and Financial Affairs Committee in the 129th and 130th legislatures. She was a member of the bipartisan Land Conservation Task Force.

In May 2024, Breen became the director of government affairs for Maine Conservation Voters.

== Personal life ==
Breen lives in Falmouth with her husband, Jay Geller. She has two adult children, Emma and Aaron.

== Electoral history ==
=== Maine State Senate ===
2014 Maine Senate District 25 Democratic Primary
Party	Candidate	Votes	%
Democratic	Catherine Breen	2,164	67.8%
Democratic	Stephen Woods	1,028	32.2%
Total votes		3,192	100.0%

2014 Maine Senate District 25 General Election
Party	Candidate	Votes	%	±%
Democratic	Catherine Breen	10,930	48.1%	
Republican	Cathy Manchester	10,898	48.0%	
Total votes		21,828	100.0%	
Democratic gain from Independent				

2016 Maine Senate District 25 Democratic Primary
Party	Candidate	Votes	%
Democratic	Catherine Breen		
Total votes			100.0%

2016 Maine Senate District 25 General Election
Party	Candidate	Votes	%
Democratic	Catherine Breen	15,546	58.0%
Republican	Barton Ladd	11,247	42.0%
Total votes		26,793	100.0%
Democratic hold			

2018 Maine Senate District 25 Democratic Primary
Party	Candidate	Votes	%
Democratic	Catherine Breen	5,627	100.0%
Total votes		5,627	100.0%

2018 Maine Senate District 25 General Election
Party	Candidate	Votes	%
Democratic	Catherine Breen	15,348	61.9%
Republican	Cathleen Nichols	9,448	38.1%
Total votes		24,796	100.0%
Democratic hold			

2020 Maine Senate District 25 Democratic Primary
Party	Candidate	Votes	%
Democratic	Catherine Breen	7,997	100.0%
Total votes		7,997	100.0%

2020 Maine Senate District 25 General Election
Party	Candidate	Votes	%
Democratic	Catherine Breen	18,587	62.0%
Republican	Jennifer White	11,404	38.0%
Total votes		29,991	100.0%
Democratic hold			
