= Henry Ingwersen =

American state politician in Maine

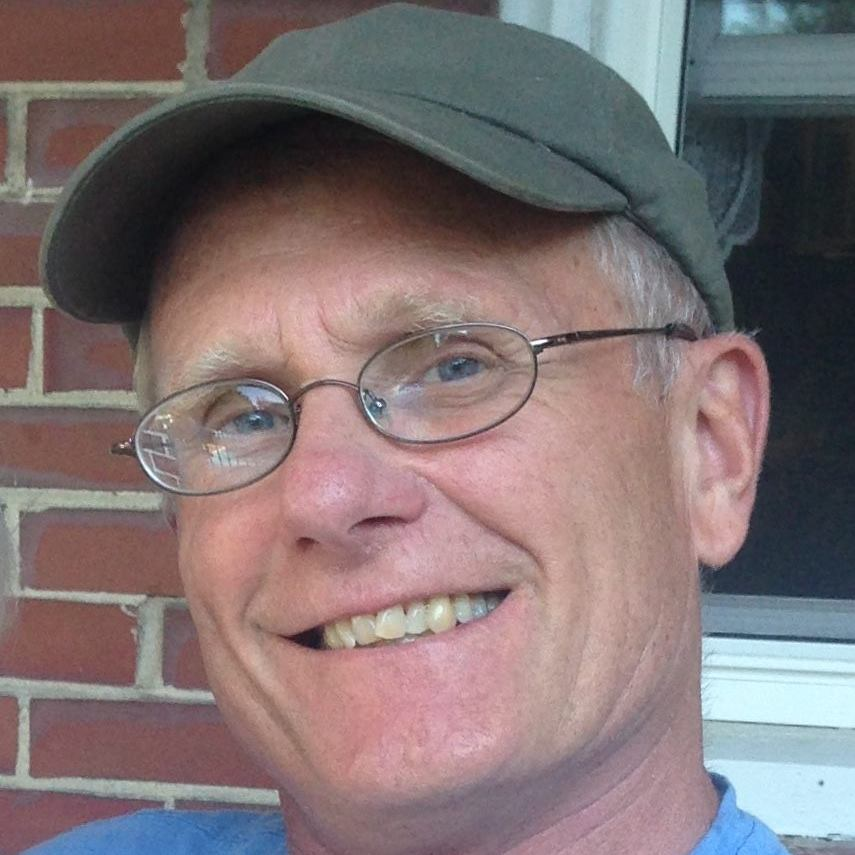

Member of the Maine Senate from the 32nd district
- Incumbent
- Assumed office December 7, 2022
- Preceded by: Susan Deschambault

Member of the Maine House of Representatives from the 10th district
- In office December 5, 2018 – December 2, 2020
- Preceded by: Wayne Parry
- Succeeded by: Wayne Parry

Personal details
- Born: January 4, 1951 (age 75)
- Party: Democratic
- Spouse: Christine Ingwersen
- Education: Goddard College (B.A.) University of Southern Maine (M.A.)
- Website: www.hen4ten.org

Henry Ingwersen (born January 4, 1951), is an American politician from Maine. A Democrat, Ingwersen represents the 32nd district in the Maine Senate since 2022 and previously represented District 10 in the Maine House of Representatives from 2018 to 2020. In 2020, he was defeated for reelection by former Representative Wayne Parry. In 2022, he was elected to Maine Senate.
