= Pinny Beebe-Center =

American politician and Maine State Senator

Member of the Maine Senate from the 12th district
- Incumbent
- Assumed office December 7, 2022
- Preceded by: David Miramant

Member of the Maine House of Representatives from the 93rd district
- In office 2015 – December 2, 2020
- Preceded by: Elizabeth Dickerson
- Succeeded by: Valli Geiger

Personal details
- Born: Salem, Massachusetts
- Party: Democratic
- Website: pinny.mainecandidate.com

Anne "Pinny" Beebe-Center is an American politician from Maine. She serves in the Maine State Senate representing District 12, comprising Knox County. Beebe-Center was born in Salem, Massachusetts and moved with her family throughout the East Coast of the United States before settling in Maine following college. She worked for the State of Maine and for various education and nonprofit organizations, first seeking public office in 2002 when she was elected commissioner of Knox County. Beebe-Center served three terms in the Maine House of Representatives beginning in 2015 before running for the Maine Senate in 2022. She is currently serving her first term.

== Early life and education ==
Beebe-Center was born in Salem, Massachusetts and was the oldest of six children. Her father was in the Coast Guard and the family moved frequently to various locations on the East Coast of the United States. After completing college in 1975, Beebe-Center moved to Yarmouth, Maine. She purchased a home in Rockland in 1980 and still resides there.

== Career ==
In her first two decades in Maine, Beebe-Center worked for the State of Maine in both the Department of Education and the Department of Transportation. She has also worked as a teacher at the Riley School in Rockport, business manager for the Wayfinder Schools, and regional manager at the Penquis commuinity action program where she founded the Knox County Homeless Coalition.

In 2002, Beebe-Center was elected Knox County commissioner. She was re-elected in 2006 and served at total of eight years in the position.

=== Maine State Legislature ===
Beebe-Center's first state campaign was during a 2015 special election for Maine House District 93, serving Rockland and Owls Head. Her predecessor, Elizabeth Dickerson, resigned in order to relocate out of state. Beebe-Center received 53% of the vote, defeating three opponents. She was sworn in to the Maine House on March 17, 2015. Beebe-Center was re-elected in 2016 and 2018, and declined to run in 2020.

Beebe-Center announced her candidacy for Maine Senate District 12 on 24 June 2021. Her predecessor, David Miramant, retired due to term limits. Beebe-Center ran unopposed in the 2022 primary and defeated Republican Scott Rocknack 60%-40% in the general election.

== Electoral history ==
2015 Maine House District 93 special election
| Party | Candidate | Votes | % |
|---|---|---|---|
| Democratic | Pinny Beebe-Center | 915 | 53%% |
| Republican | James Kalloch | 770 | 45% |
| Green | Ron Huber | 34 | 2% |
| Libertarian | Shawn Levasseur | 11 | 0% |
| Total votes | | 1,730 | 100% |

2016 Maine House District 93
| Party | Candidate | Votes | % |
|---|---|---|---|
| Democratic | Pinny Beebe-Center | 2,531 | 56% |
| Republican | Donald Robishaw | 1,993 | 44% |
| Total votes | | 4,524 | 100% |

2018 Maine House District 93 Democratic primary
| Party | Candidate | Votes | % |
|---|---|---|---|
| Democratic | Pinny Beebe-Center | 905 | 100% |
| Total votes | | 905 | 100% |

2018 Maine House District 93 general election
| Party | Candidate | Votes | % |
|---|---|---|---|
| Democratic | Pinny Beebe-Center | 2,408 | 62% |
| Republican | Maynard Stanley | 1,478 | 38% |
| Total votes | | 3,886 | 100% |

2022 Maine Senate District 12 Democratic primary
| Party | Candidate | Votes | % |
|---|---|---|---|
| Democratic | Pinny Beebe-Center | 2,889 | 100% |
| Total votes | | 2,889 | 100% |

2022 Maine Senate District 12 general election
| Party | Candidate | Votes | % |
|---|---|---|---|
| Democratic | Pinny Beebe-Center | 12,009 | 60% |
| Republican | Scott Rocknak | 8,053 | 40% |
| Total votes | | 20,062 | 100% |
