= Anne Carney =

American politician and attorney

Member of the Maine Senate from the 29th district
- Incumbent
- Assumed office December 2, 2020
- Preceded by: Rebecca Millett

Member of the Maine House of Representatives from the 30th district
- In office December 2018 – December 2, 2020
- Preceded by: Kim Monaghan-Derrig
- Succeeded by: Rebecca Millett

Personal details
- Born: 1963 (age 62–63) Baltimore, Maryland, U.S.
- Party: Democratic
- Spouse: David Wennberg
- Children: 3
- Education: Haverford College (BA); Harvard University (MTS); University of Maine (JD)

Anne Carney is an American Democratic politician and attorney from Maine. She currently serves in the Maine Senate representing District 29, which consists of Cape Elizabeth, South Portland, and part of Scarborough.

Carney graduated from the University of Maine School of Law in 1990, after which practiced employment, civil rights and municipal law. She was elected to represent District 30 in the Maine House of Representatives in 2018. In 2020, Carney was elected to her first term in the Maine Senate. She was re-elected in 2022, 2024, and 2026. She is Senate chair of the Legislature's Joint Standing Committee on Judiciary, which handles legislation on the courts, civil and criminal procedure, family law, civil rights, firearms, and reproductive rights.

== Early life, education & career ==
Carney was born in Baltimore, Maryland in 1963. She received a B.A. from Haverford College and then completed a Master of Theological Studies from Harvard University in 1987. Carney and her husband moved to Maine in 1988, and she graduated cum laude from the University of Maine School of Law in 1990.

Working at the law firm of Norman, Hanson, & DeTroy, Carney spent 16 years practicing employment, civil rights and municipal law. She became an In-House Volunteer Attorney at Pine Tree Legal Assistance and worked there for eight years before running for the Maine House in 2018.

== Political career ==
=== Maine House ===
Carney credits an emotional conversation with her daughter as her inspiration to run for public office. In a 2018 interview, she explained that the morning after the 2016 United States presidential election, her daughter called her in tears, expressing dismay at Donald Trump's victory and uncertainty about whether to start a family under the circumstances. Carney explained that “I felt personally accountable when I realized the impact one individual over another had on my family.”

In the 2018 House District 30 Democratic primary, Carney defeated fellow Democrat Mary Ann Lynch 64-36%. In the general election, she defeated Republican Charles Rich 75%-25%. She served on the Labor and Housing Committee during her House term.

=== Maine Senate ===
Carney announced her candidacy for Maine Senate District 29 on November 2, 2019. She won a three-way Democratic primary, beating fellow Democrats Sari Greene and Eben Rose with 58% of the vote. In the general election, Carney faced Republican former Cumberland County District Attorney Stephanie Anderson and defeated her 67%-33%.

Carney was re-elected in 2022, defeating Republican John Lewis 75.5% to 24.5%, and in 2024, defeating Republican Christopher M. Howell 74.9% to 25.1%, and in 2026, defeating Republican Vincent Maietta 78.5% to 21.5%.

Carney has been Senate chair of the Judiciary Committee since December 2020, when she was appointed at the start of her first Senate term. In the 131st Legislature she also served on the Environment and Natural Resources Committee and the Joint Rules Committee. For the 132nd Legislature, Senate President Mattie Daughtry reappointed her Judiciary chair and named her Senate chair of the Joint Rules Committee; she also serves on the Inland Fisheries and Wildlife Committee.^{,}

She is co-chair of the Legislature's Gun Safety Caucus.

== Awards and recognition ==
- Award for Pro Bono Services, Pine Tree Legal Assistance (2016).
- Buzz Fitzgerald Award, Maine Gun Safety Coalition (2022).
- Children’s Advocacy Center Award, Maine Coalition Against Sexual Assault (2024).
- Howard H. Dana, Jr. Award, Maine Justice Foundation (2024). Recognizes contributions to access to justice. She was nominated by Pine Tree Legal Assistance, Maine Law’s clinical programs, the Immigrant Legal Advocacy Project, Legal Services for Maine Elders, Maine Equal Justice, and the Maine Volunteer Lawyers Project.
- Legislator of the Year, Maine Chapter of the American Academy of Pediatrics (2025). Recognizes legislative leadership to make Maine a healthier and safer place for children.
- Champion of Justice Award, Disability Rights Maine (2025).
- Survivor Justice Leader Award, The Jensen Project (2026). Recognizes work on behalf of survivors of human trafficking.
- Legacy of Leadership Award, Maine Coalition Against Sexual Assault (2026).
- Legislative Champion Award, Maine Women’s Lobby (2026).

== Personal life ==
Carney and her husband David Wennberg have three adult children. They live in Cape Elizabeth. Carney's past involvement in community organizations included several in Cape Elizabeth, including the Two Lights Road Bicycle Path Committee, the Cape Elizabeth Land Trust, and the school system. She has been involved with the competitive swimming community in Maine and is a member of the Bicycle Coalition of Maine. She was president of the Cape Elizabeth Land Trust board from 2014 to 2017, led the organization to national accreditation in 2015, and completed her board service in 2018.

== Electoral record ==
=== Maine House ===
2018 Maine House District 30 Democratic primary
Party	Candidate	Votes	%
Democratic	Anne Carney	1,387	64.2%
Democratic	Mary Ann Lynch	774	35.8%
Total votes		2,161	100.0%

2018 Maine House District 30 General Election
Party	Candidate	Votes	%
Democratic	Anne Carney	4,028	75.1%
Republican	Charles Rich	1,332	24.9%
Total votes		5,360	100.0%

=== Maine Senate ===
2020 Maine Senate District 29 Democratic primary
Party	Candidate	Votes	%
Democratic	Anne Carney	4,931	57.6%
Democratic	Sari Greene	2,537	29.6%
Democratic	Eben Rose	1,098	12.8%
Total votes		8,566	100.0%

2020 Maine Senate District 29 General Election
Party	Candidate	Votes	%
Democratic	Anne Carney	16,847	67.2%
Republican	Stephanie Anderson	8,221	32.8%
Total votes		25,068	100.0%

2022 Maine Senate District 29 General Election
Party	Candidate	Votes	%
Democratic	Anne Carney	15,432	75.5%
Republican	John Lewis	5,012	24.5%
Total votes		20,444	100.0%

2024 Maine Senate District 29 General Election
Party	Candidate	Votes	%
Democratic	Anne Carney	17,518	74.9%
Republican	Christopher M. Howell	5,884	25.1%
Total votes		23,402	100.0%

2026 Maine Senate District 29 General Election
Party	Candidate	Votes	%
Democratic	Anne Carney	17,154	78.5%
Republican	Vincent Maietta	4,687	21.5%
Total votes		21,841	100.0%
