= Teresa Pierce =

American politician

Majority Leader of the Maine Senate
- Incumbent
- Assumed office December 3, 2024
- Preceded by: Eloise Vitelli

Member of the Maine Senate from the 25th district
- Incumbent
- Assumed office December 7, 2022
- Preceded by: Cathy Breen

Member of the Maine House of Representatives from the 44th district
- In office December 2014 – December 7, 2022
- Preceded by: Mary Nelson
- Succeeded by: Amy Kuhn

Personal details
- Party: Democratic
- Education: University of Colorado, Boulder (BA)

Teresa S. Pierce is the Majority Leader of the Maine Senate. Pierce, a Democrat from Falmouth, Maine, has served in the Maine Senate since 2022 and previously served in the Maine House of Representatives from 2014 to 2022.

Prior to serving in the Legislature, Pierce served for nine years (three terms) on the Falmouth Town Council.

Maine Senate
Preceded by Eloise Vitelli	Majority Leader of the Maine Senate; 2024–present	Incumbent
