= Marianne Moore (politician) =

American politician

Member of the Maine Senate from the 6th district
- Incumbent
- Assumed office December 5, 2018
- Preceded by: Joyce Maker

Personal details
- Party: Republican
- Education: Dallas Baptist University (BAAS); Southern Methodist University (MBA)

Marianne Moore is an American politician from Maine. Moore, a Republican, was elected to the Maine Senate in 2018 (District 6). She is a resident of Calais, Maine and previously served as mayor. In the Legislature, Moore represents a largely rural district covering Washington County, Maine. In 2019, Moore co-sponsored a bill to end "food-shaming" in public schools. It "prohibits punishing, openly identifying or stigmatizing a student who cannot pay or who has payments due."

Moore earned a BAAS in Computer Software Programming/Computer Science from Dallas Baptist University and an MBA in Managing Information Systems from Southern Methodist University.
