= David Dutremble =

American politician

Member of the Maine Senate from the 4th district
- In office 2012–2016
- Preceded by: Nancy Sullivan
- Succeeded by: Susan Deschambault

Personal details
- Party: Democratic
- Spouse: Charlene Dutremble
- Profession: Firefighter and electrician

David E. Dutremble is an American politician and firefighter from Maine. Dutremble is a Democratic State Senator from Maine's 4th District, representing part of York County, including the city of Biddeford and the neighboring towns of Kennebunkport, Arundel and Kennebunk. In 2012, he beat Independent James Booth to become State Senator, replacing fellow Democrat Nancy Sullivan, who was unable to seek re-election due to term limits. In 2012, Dutremble was named chair of the Inland Fisheries and Wildlife committee.

He resigned his seat on January 27, 2016, after already having said he would not seek reelection. He stated that he wished to focus on treatment for alcohol abuse.

== Personal ==
Dutremble is a Lieutenant Firefighter and EMT with the Biddeford Fire Department as well as a Limited Master Electrician in house-wiring. He attended York County Community College for licensure. Dutremble is the cousin of Dennis L. Dutremble, who served 8 terms in the Maine Legislature, including a term as State Senate President.
