= Joyce Maker =

American politician

Joyce A. Maker

Member of the Maine Senate from the 6th District
- In office December 2016 – December 5, 2018
- Preceded by: David Burns
- Succeeded by: Marianne Moore

Member of the Maine House of Representatives for the 31st District
- In office December 2010 – December 2016
- Succeeded by: Anne C. Perry

Personal details
- Party: Republican
- Education: University of Maine at Machias
- Profession: College Administrator

Joyce A. Maker is an American politician from Maine. A Republican, Maker has served in local government, including the Calais Town Council and School Board as well as in the Maine House of Representatives (District 31) from 2010 until 2016. A retired college administrator, Maker worked for Washington County Community College. She attended both the University of Maine at Machias and Washington County Community College. She also served on the board and as chair of the Finance Authority of Maine.

In June 2016, Maker won the primary for her party's nomination in Senate District 6, which includes all of Washington County and some of Hancock County. She defeated Calais City Councilor Billy Howard, who was endorsed by Governor Paul LePage. Maker defeated Democrat Rock Alley in the November general election, and took office in December.
