= Susan Deschambault =

American politician (born 1947)

Member of the Maine Senate from the 32nd district
- In office December 2016 – December 7, 2022
- Preceded by: David Dutremble
- Succeeded by: Henry Ingwersen

Personal details
- Party: Democratic
- Children: 1
- Education: BA in sociology
- Alma mater: St. Francis College (Maine)

Susan A. Deschambault (born November 25, 1947) is an American politician and retired law enforcement officer from Maine. She represents Maine Senate District 32, which comprises the towns of Alfred, Arundel, Biddeford, Dayton, Kennebunkport and Lyman. Deschambault, a Democrat from Biddeford, was first elected in a special election in March 2016. Prior to the Senate, she served two terms as a city councilor in Biddeford and was president of the Maine Association of Police for 21 years.

== Early life and education ==
Deschambault was born in 1974 and received her Bachelor of Arts in sociology from St. Francis College. She is a licensed social worker. Deschambault served as a Biddeford city councilor for two terms and was the chairman of the Biddeford Planning Board.

== Maine Department of Corrections ==
Deschambault began her career in corrections at the Stevens School for Girls in Hallowell, Maine following the enactment of the 1976 Code of Juvenile Justice. She continued working as a social worker and correctional caseworker for the Maine Department of Corrections for 43 years until her retirement.

She spent more than 40 years in the Maine Department of Corrections as a social worker and served on the Biddeford police commission for 12 years, eventually becoming Biddeford's first female police commissioner.

== Maine Senate ==
On January 28, 2016, Senator David Dutremble of Maine Senate District 28 resigned his position to focus on recovering from alcoholism. On March 29, a special election was held to fill his vacant seat, and Deschambault defeated Republican Stephen Martin 57%-41%.

On Friday, April 2, when Deschambault and her family arrived at Governor Paul LePage's office for her swearing-in ceremony, they were informed that the ceremony had been canceled by the governor. According to a spokesperson for LePage, the governor canceled the ceremony as a response to state Democrats' lack of support for his nominee to the Maine Unemployment Insurance Commission. LePage eventually swore in Deschambault on April 5, the last day he was legally obligated to do so. Senate President Michael Thibodeau postponed roll-call votes in the Senate until after Deschambault was sworn in.

In June 2016, Deschambault won the Democratic primary for the November 8 general election with 85% of the vote and defeated Republican Matthew Stone 59%-41% in the general election.

Deschambault and a delegation of other New England state legislators traveled to Taiwan to meet with other elected officials and discuss forms of democratic government.

== Personal life ==
Deschambault is a lifelong Biddeford resident. She has one adult son.

== Electoral history ==
2016 Maine House District 32 Special Election
| Party | Candidate | Votes | % |
|---|---|---|---|
| Democratic | Susan Deschambault | | 85% |
| Republican | Stephen Martin | | |
| Total votes | | | 100.0% |

2016 Maine Senate District 32 Democratic primary
| Party | Candidate | Votes | % |
|---|---|---|---|
| Democratic | Susan Deschambault | 1,926 | 85.4% |
| Democratic | Joanne Twomey | 330 | 14.6% |
| Total votes | | 2,256 | 100.0% |

2016 Maine House District 32 General Election
| Party | Candidate | Votes | % |
|---|---|---|---|
| Democratic | Susan Deschambault | 11,880 | 59.0% |
| Republican | Matthew Stone | 8,249 | 40.1% |
| Total votes | | 20,129 | 100.0% |

2018 Maine Senate District 32 Democratic primary
| Party | Candidate | Votes | % |
|---|---|---|---|
| Democratic | Susan Deschambault | 3,424 | 100.0%% |
| Total votes | | 3,424 | 100.0% |

2018 Maine Senate District 32 General Election
| Party | Candidate | Votes | % |
|---|---|---|---|
| Democratic | Susan Deschambault | 10,620 | 62.6% |
| Republican | Scott Normandeau | 6,338 | 37.4%% |
| Total votes | | 16,958 | 100.0% |

2020 Maine Senate District 32 Democratic primary
| Party | Candidate | Votes | % |
|---|---|---|---|
| Democratic | Susan Deschambault | 4,617 | 85.4% |
| Total votes | | 4,617 | 100.0% |

2020 Maine House District 32 General Election
| Party | Candidate | Votes | % |
|---|---|---|---|
| Democratic | Susan Deschambault | 12,838 | 57.2% |
| Republican | Robert Daigle | 9,612 | 42.8% |
| Total votes | | 20,129 | 100.0% |
