= David Miramant =

American politician

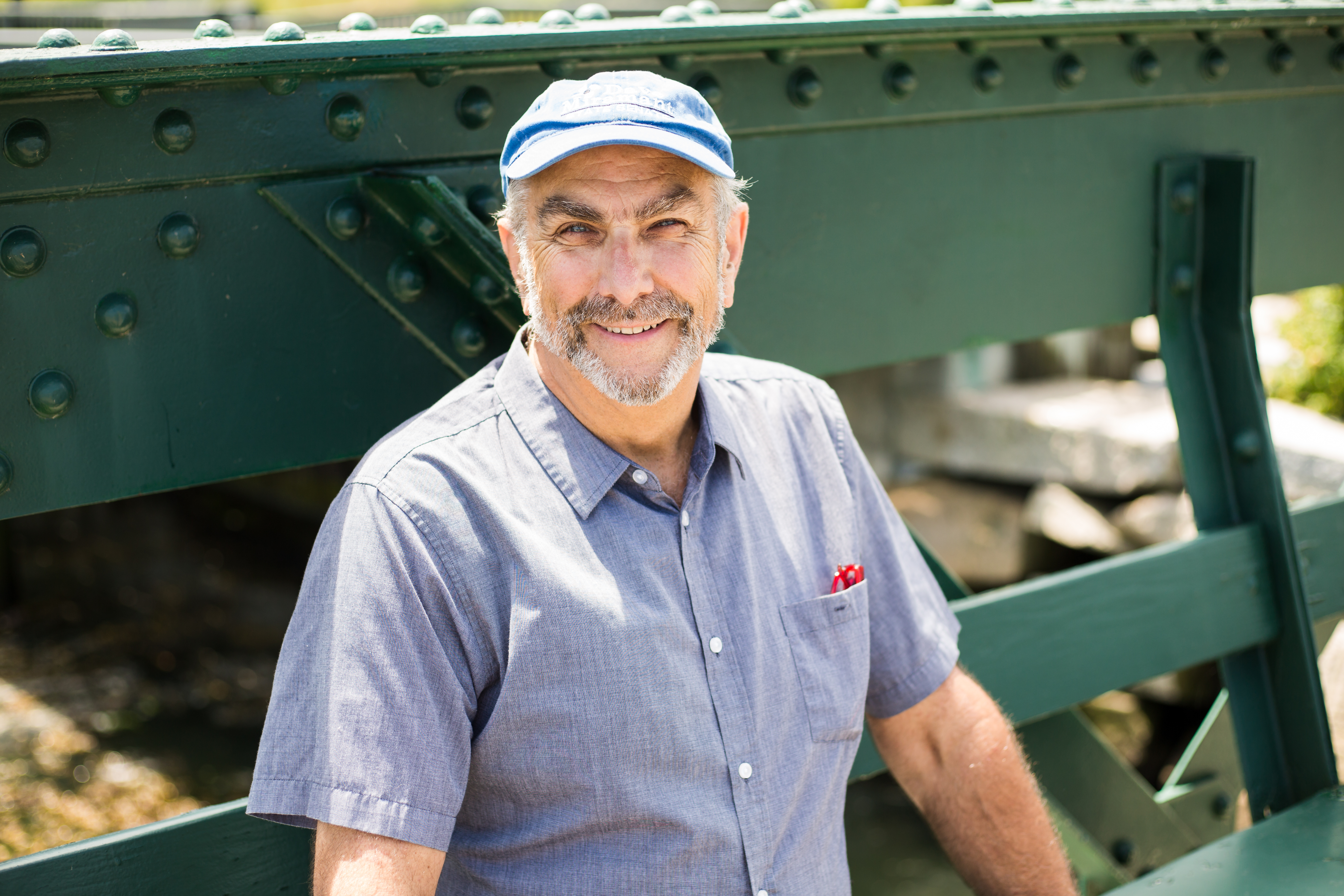

Member of the Maine Senate from the 12th district
- In office December 2014 – December 7, 2022
- Preceded by: Edward Mazurek
- Succeeded by: Pinny Beebe-Center

Member of the Maine House of Representatives from the 46 district
- In office December 2006 – December 2008
- Preceded by: Susan Dorr

Personal details
- Party: Democratic
- Spouse: Dee Webster
- Education: University of Maine at Farmington
- Website: davemiramant.com

David Miramant (born May 22, 1955) is an American Democratic politician and pilot from Maine. He represents Senate District 12, Knox County, in the Maine Senate. Miramant served in the Maine House of Representatives from 2006 to 2008 and was first elected to the Senate in 2014. Miramant is a career pilot: He flew commercial Boeing 767s at Delta Air Lines and has owned and operated a glider ride service on coastal Maine since 2005.

== Early life and education ==
Miramant's father served in the Air Force and the family traveled frequently when Miramant was a child. He attended Bedford High School outside of Boston from 1969 to 1973 and became active politically during the civil rights movement and the Vietnam War.

Miramant attended the University of Maine at Farmington from 1975 to 1980 and completed a Bachelor of Arts in biology. He received his airline transport pilot licence, qualified as a captain on the Boeing 767 and flew for Delta Air Lines. He has also owned and operated several small business, including a hotel, restaurants, and a flying service, and worked as a boat captain.

== Political career ==
Miramant served on the Camden, Maine Select Board from 2000 to 2003 and was on the budget and personnel committees. He was elected to the Maine House of Representatives in 2006 to represent Camden and Rockport and served one term until 2008 when he unsuccessfully challenged incumbent Chris Rector for the Senate District 22 seat.

In February 2014, Miramant announced that he would seek to replace the retiring Edward Mazurek for the renamed Senate District 12. He ran unopposed in the Democratic primary and defeated Republican Paula Sutton 52%-48% in the general election.

In the 2020 Senate District 12 general election, Miramant defeated Republican Gordon Page 58%-42%. In December 2020, he was appointed Senate chair of the Marine Resources Committee and also sat on the Labor and Housing Committee. As of March 2021, Miramant is a member of the Coastal Caucus and a commissioner on the Atlantic States Marine Fisheries Commission. In March 2021, he was appointed to the Coastal and Marine working group of the Maine Climate Council.

== Personal life ==
Miramant has been married to Dee Webster since 1980 and they have two adult children. Miramant has owned and operated Spirit Soaring Glider Rides out of Owls Head, Maine since 2005.

== Electoral record ==
2006 Maine House District 46 General Election
Party	Candidate	Votes	%
Democratic	David Miramant	2,295	51.2%
Republican	Stephen L. Bowen	2,186	48.8%
Total votes		4,481	100.0%

2014 Maine Senate District 12 General Election
Party	Candidate	Votes	%
Democratic	David Miramant	9,162	52.0%
Republican	Paula Sutton	8,434	48.0%
Total votes		17,596	100.0%

2016 Maine Senate District 12 General Election
Party	Candidate	Votes	%
Democratic	David Miramant	11,608	51.8%
Republican	David F. Emery	10,823	48.2%
Total votes		22,431	100.0%

2018 Maine Senate District 12 General Election
Party	Candidate	Votes	%
Democratic	David Miramant	12,467	63.4%
Republican	Wendy Pelletier	7,192	36.6%
Total votes		19,659	100.0%

2020 Maine Senate District 12 General Election
Party	Candidate	Votes	%
Democratic	David Miramant	14,049	57.6%
Republican	Gordon Page	10,342	42.4%
Total votes		24,391	100.0%
