= Scott Cyrway =

American deputy sheriff and politician

Member of the Maine Senate from the 16th district
- Incumbent
- Assumed office December 4, 2024
- Preceded by: David LaFountain
- In office December 3, 2014 – December 7, 2022
- Preceded by: Colleen Lachowicz
- Succeeded by: David LaFountain

Member of the Maine House of Representatives from the 63rd district
- In office December 7, 2022 – December 4, 2024
- Preceded by: Bruce Bickford
- Succeeded by: Paul Flynn

Personal details
- Party: Republican
- Profession: Deputy Sheriff

Scott Cyrway is an American deputy sheriff and politician from Maine. Cyrway, a Republican from Benton, serves as State Senator from Maine's 16th District, representing the northern part of Kennebec, including the population center of Waterville and the immediate rural part of the county north of Waterville. He was first elected to the Maine State Senate in 2014 over incumbent Democrat Colleen Lachowicz of Waterville.

He began working in Kennebec County Sheriff's Office in 1992. He served as the State Coordinator for the Drug Abuse Resistance Education (D.A.R.E.) program for 22 years prior to serving in the Maine Senate. In the Senate, he served as Senate co-chair of the Veteran's and Legal Affairs Committee.

== Maine state senate district 16 election, 2016 ==
In the 2016 Maine state senate district 16 election, incumbent Scott Cryway faced Democratic rival Henry Beck. Cyrway won with 54.2% of the vote.

The primary election took place on June 14, 2016, and the general election was held on November 8, 2016. Scott Cyrway ran unopposed in the Republican primary.

== Political positions ==
=== Ranked Choice Voting ===
Scott Cyrway opposes ranked choice voting.

== Bibliography ==
- "Scott W. Cyrway" Bangor Daily News
