= Kevin Battle =

American politician and police officer

Kevin Battle is an American politician and police officer from South Portland, Maine. Battle represented Maine's 33rd house of representatives district from 2014 to 2018.

== Electoral History ==
General election for Maine House of Representatives District 33, 2016
Party	Candidate	Votes	%
Republican	Kevin Battle	2,161	53.15%
Democratic	Brad Fox	1,905	46.85%

General election for Maine House of Representatives District 33, 2014
Party	Candidate	Votes	%
Republican	Kevin Battle	1,471	44.3%
Democratic	Rosemarie De Angelis	1,407	42.4%
Green	Andrew Reddy	329	9.9%
None	Blank Votes	111	3.3%

General election for Maine House of Representatives District 124, 2012
Party	Candidate	Votes	%
Democratic	Bryan Kaenrath	2,102	52.9%
Republican	Kevin Battle	1,873	47.1%
