= Bruce Bickford (politician) =

American politician (born 1955)

Bruce A. Bickford

Member of the Maine Senate from the 20th district
- Incumbent
- Assumed office December 4, 2024
- Preceded by: Eric Brakey

Member of the Maine House of Representatives from the 63rd district
- In office December 3, 2014 – December 7, 2022
- Preceded by: Charles Priest
- Succeeded by: Scott Cyrway

Member of the Maine House of Representatives from the 70th district
- In office December 3, 2008 – December 5, 2012
- Preceded by: Mark Paul Samson
- Succeeded by: R. Wayne Werts

Personal details
- Party: Republican

Bruce A. Bickford (born October 11, 1955) is an American politician from Maine. A Republican from Auburn, Bickford currently serves in the Maine Senate for the 20th district Bickford formerly in the Maine House of Representatives. He was elected in 2008, 2010, 2014, 2016, 2018, and 2020. As of 2021, he is a member of the Taxation Committee as well as the Joint Select Committee on Marijuana Legalization Implementation.

In March 2021, Bickford jokingly referred to convicted rapist Harvey Weinstein during legislative hearings via his Zoom background. It was announced that he would be investigated by the Maine House of Representatives' human resources department.

Bickford graduated from Edward Little High School in 1973. He has worked as a restaurant manager, realtor, and other small businesses.

Maine House of Representatives
Preceded by Mark Paul Samson	Member of the Maine House of Representatives from the 70th district 2008–2012	Succeeded by R. Wayne Werts
Preceded by Charles R. Priest	Member of the Maine House of Representatives from the 63rd district 2014–2022	Succeeded by Scott Cyrway
Maine Senate
Preceded by Eric Brakey	Member of the Maine Senate from the 20th district 2024–present	Incumbent
