= Geoffrey Gratwick =

American politician

Member of the Maine Senate from the 9th district
- In office December 5, 2012 – December 2, 2020
- Preceded by: Nichi Farnham
- Succeeded by: Joe Baldacci

Personal details
- Born: July 16, 1943 (age 83) White Plains, New York, U.S.
- Party: Democratic
- Children: 2
- Education: Harvard University (AB); Columbia University (MD)

Geoffrey Gratwick (born July 16, 1943) is an American politician and physician who served as a member of the Maine Senate for the 9th district, representing part of Penobscot County, including Bangor and the neighboring town of Hermon. Gratwick also served on the Bangor City Council for nine years.

== Early life and education ==
Gratwick was born in White Plains, New York. His father was a physician and school administrator who worked as the headmaster of the Horace Mann School and Nichols School. His mother was a librarian at the Riverdale Country School. Gratwick earned a bachelor's degree from Harvard University and studied abroad at the University of Cambridge before earning a Doctor of Medicine from the Columbia College of Physicians and Surgeons. He completed his residency at the Weill Cornell Medical Center, specializing in rheumatology.

== Career ==
Gratwick practiced medicine in Bangor from 1979 to 2015 and ran arthritis clinics in Waterville, Machias, and Presque Isle.

In 2012, Gratwick won a hotly-contested race for a seat in the Maine Senate. In the Legislature, he served on the Insurance and Financial Services Committee, Environmental and the Natural Resources Committee, and Government Oversight Committee. In 2017, he was appointed to the Opioid Task Force. In late-2017, he was the driving force behind the formation of the Health Care Task Force.

== Personal life ==
Gratwick and his wife Lucy, a clinical psychologist and president of the Bangor Land Trust, have lived in Bangor since 1978. They have two adopted children and six grandchildren. Gratwick is a board member of the Maine Humanities Council and is a longtime member of the Bangor Rotary Club.
