= David LaFountain =

American politician

Member of the Maine Senate from the 16th district
- In office December 6, 2022 – December 3, 2024
- Preceded by: Scott Cyrway
- Succeeded by: Scott Cyrway

Personal details
- Party: Democratic
- Spouse: Lee Ann LeFountain
- Education: Winslow High School

David LaFountain is a retired fire chief and state senator from Winslow, Maine. LaFountain is a graduate from Winslow High School. After high school he worked as a fireman eventually becoming the Fire Chief for the Winslow and Waterville fire departments.

== Political career ==
LaFountain's political career started in 2022 when he ran for a seat in the Maine Senate. He ran unopposed in the 16th district's primary. In the general election he won a tight race with 51% of the vote.

== Electoral history ==
Democratic Primary for Maine State Senate District 16, 2022
Party	Candidate	Votes	%
Democratic	David LaFountain	894	100.0%

General election for Maine State Senate District 16, 2022
Party	Candidate	Votes	%
Democratic	David LaFountain	8,349	51.0%
Republican	Michael D. Perkins	8,022	26.3%
