= David C. Burns =

American politician

Member of the Maine Senate from the 29th district
- In office 2012–2016
- Preceded by: Kevin Raye
- Succeeded by: Joyce Maker

Personal details
- Party: Republican

David C. Burns is an American politician from Maine. Burns is a former Republican State Senator from Maine's 29th District, representing part of Penobscot, Hancock county and Washington Counties, including his residence of Whiting. He was first elected to the Maine House of Representatives in 2008 and the Maine State Senate in 2012, replacing fellow Republican and Senate President Kevin Raye.
