= Hermon, Maine =

Town in Maine, United States

- Town
- Location within the state of Maine Hermon (the United States)
- Coordinates: 44°48′50″N 68°52′41″W
- Country: United States
- State: Maine
- County: Penobscot

Area
  - Total: 36.81 sq mi (95.34 km^{2})
  - Land: 35.87 sq mi (92.90 km^{2})
  - Water: 0.94 sq mi (2.43 km^{2})
- Elevation: 246 ft (75 m)

Population (2020)
  - Total: 6,461
  - Density: 176/sq mi (67.8/km^{2})
- Time zone: UTC-5 (Eastern (EST))
  - Summer (DST): UTC-4 (EDT)
- ZIP code: 04401
- Area code: 207
- FIPS code: 23-32510
- GNIS feature ID: 582517
- Website: www.hermonmaine.gov

Hermon is a town in Penobscot County, Maine, United States. The population was 6,461 at the 2020 census.

== Geography ==
According to the United States Census Bureau, the town has a total area of 36.81 square miles (95.34 km^{2}), of which 35.87 square miles (92.90 km^{2}) is land and 0.94 square miles (2.43 km^{2}) is water. It is drained by the Souadabscook Stream and Wheeler Stream. Principle bodies of water include Hermon Pond (462 acres), Tracy Pond (47 acres) and George Pond (49 acres).

Hermon is bordered on the northwest by Levant, on the northeast by Glenburn, on the east by Bangor, on the south by Hampden and on the west by Carmel. It is crossed by U.S. Route 2 and Maine State Route 222.

== Historic building ==
The District No. 5 Schoolhouse (1880) is listed on the National Register of Historic Places.

== Demographics ==
Historical population
| Census | Pop. | Note | %± |
|---|---|---|---|
| 1820 | 266 | | — |
| 1830 | 535 | | 101.1% |
| 1840 | 1,042 | | 94.8% |
| 1850 | 1,374 | | 31.9% |
| 1860 | 1,433 | | 4.3% |
| 1870 | 1,489 | | 3.9% |
| 1880 | 1,394 | | −6.4% |
| 1890 | 1,282 | | −8.0% |
| 1900 | 1,183 | | −7.7% |
| 1910 | 1,210 | | 2.3% |
| 1920 | 1,190 | | −1.7% |
| 1930 | 1,204 | | 1.2% |
| 1940 | 1,182 | | −1.8% |
| 1950 | 1,728 | | 46.2% |
| 1960 | 2,087 | | 20.8% |
| 1970 | 2,376 | | 13.8% |
| 1980 | 3,170 | | 33.4% |
| 1990 | 3,755 | | 18.5% |
| 2000 | 4,437 | | 18.2% |
| 2010 | 5,416 | | 22.1% |
| 2020 | 6,461 | | 19.3% |
U.S. Decennial Census

=== 2020 census ===
As of the 2020 century, there were 6,461 people living in the town of Hermon, Maine. The population density was 175.5 inhabitants per square mile (67.8/km^2). There were 2,619 housing units in the town. Hermon’s population increased by approximately 19.3% from 5,416 people in 2010 to 6,461 people in 2020. The town’s total land area was 35.87 square miles (92.90 km^2), and the total area, including water, was 36.81 square miles (95.34 km^2).

The racial makeup of the town was 95.4% White alone, 0.7% African American alone, 0.6% Asian alone, 0.3% Native Hawaiian, 1.2% Hispanic or Latino alone, and 2.8% identifying with 2 or more races. The population consisted of 21.6% of residents under the age of 18, 3.6% under the age of 5, and 20.4% aged 65 and older. Females made up 51.0% of the population. The town’s population increased from 5,416 people in 2010 to 6,461 people in 2020, an increase of approximately 19.3%.

=== 2010 census ===
As of the census of 2010, there were 5,416 people, 2,075 households, and 1,548 families living in the town. The population density was 151.0 inhabitants per square mile (58.3/km^{2}). There were 2,210 housing units at an average density of 61.6 per square mile (23.8/km^{2}). The racial makeup of the town was 97.7% White, 0.4% African American, 0.4% Native American, 0.4% Asian, 0.1% from other races, and 1.0% from two or more races. Hispanic or Latino of any race were 1.0% of the population.

There were 2,075 households, of which 33.6% had children under the age of 18 living with them, 62.0% were married couples living together, 8.6% had a female householder with no husband present, 4.0% had a male householder with no wife present, and 25.4% were non-families. 18.0% of all households were made up of individuals, and 7.3% had someone living alone who was 65 years of age or older. The average household size was 2.61 and the average family size was 2.95.

The median age in the town was 40.4 years. 23.7% of residents were under the age of 18; 7.3% were between the ages of 18 and 24; 26.6% were from 25 to 44; 30.4% were from 45 to 64; and 12% were 65 years of age or older. The gender makeup of the town was 49.3% male and 50.7% female.

=== 2000 census ===
As of the census of 2000, there were 4,437 people, 1,666 households, and 1,294 families living in the town. The population density was 123.5 inhabitants per square mile (47.7/km^{2}). There were 1,748 housing units at an average density of 48.7 per square mile (18.8/km^{2}). The racial makeup of the town was 98.08% White, 0.16% African American, 0.29% Native American, 0.43% Asian, 0.02% Pacific Islander, 0.09% from other races, and 0.92% from two or more races. Hispanic or Latino of any race were 0.52% of the population.

There were 1,666 households, out of which 39.0% had children under the age of 18 living with them, 65.5% were married couples living together, 8.8% had a female householder with no husband present, and 22.3% were non-families. 16.7% of all households were made up of individuals, and 6.5% had someone living alone who was 65 years of age or older. The average household size was 2.66 and the average family size was 2.98.

In the town, the population was spread out, with 27.1% under the age of 18, 6.0% from 18 to 24, 32.0% from 25 to 44, 25.0% from 45 to 64, and 9.9% who were 65 years of age or older. The median age was 37 years. For every 100 females, there were 94.2 males. For every 100 females age 18 and over, there were 91.9 males.

The median income for a household in the town was $47,206, and the median income for a family was $50,500. Males had a median income of $34,620 versus $23,958 for females. The per capita income for the town was $19,714. About 4.4% of families and 6.6% of the population were below the poverty line, including 6.1% of those under age 18 and 5.4% of those age 65 or over.

== Points of interest ==
- Ecotat Gardens and Arboretum
- Hermon High School
- Hermon Middle School
