= 2018 Maine Senate election =

- November 6, 2018

All 35 seats in the Maine Senate 18 seats needed for a majority
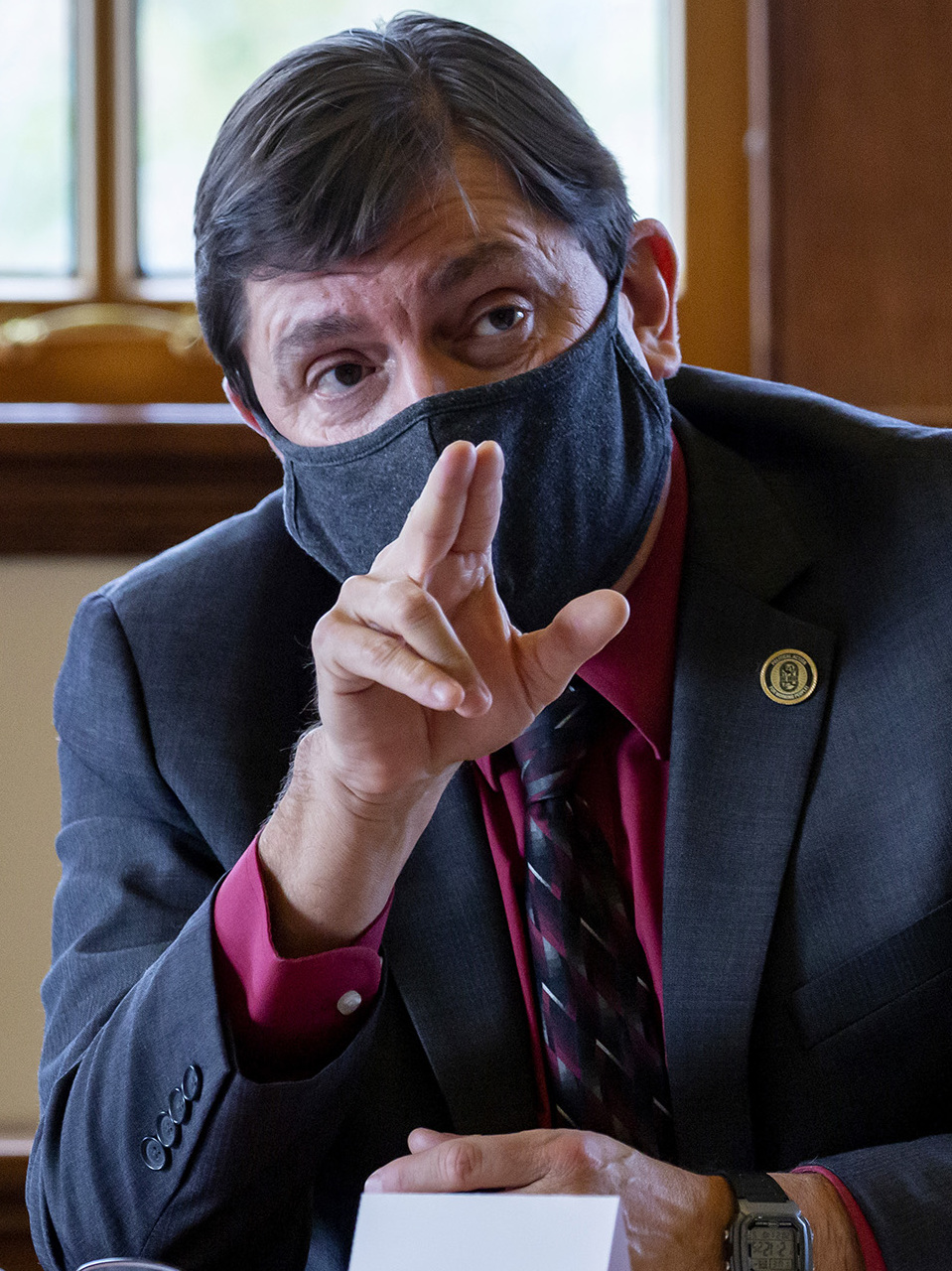

	Majority party	Minority party
Leader	Troy Jackson	Michael Thibodeau (term-limited)
Party	Democratic	Republican
Leader's seat	1st	11th
Last election	17	18
Seats before	17	18
Seats won	21	14
Seat change	▲4	▼4
Popular vote	347,752	268,735
Percentage	55.9%	43.2%
Swing	▲8.3%	▼6.0%
- Results: Democratic hold Democratic gain Republican hold
Senate President before election
Michael Thibodeau
Republican
Elected Senate President
Troy Jackson
Democratic

The 2018 Maine State Senate elections took place as part of the biennial United States elections. Maine voters elected state senators in all 35 of the state senate's districts. State senators serve two-year terms in the State Senate.

A primary election on June 12, 2018, determined which candidates appear on the November 6 general election ballot. Primary election results can be obtained from the Maine Secretary of State's website.

Following the 2016 state Senate elections, Republicans maintained effective control of the House with 18 members.

The Maine Secretary of State provides both a detailed description of each Senate seat as well as maps for each district, including this statewide Senate map showing all 35 Senate districts.

After the 2018 elections, Republicans lost control of the chamber. The Democrats needed to net one Senate seat. In the election, the Democrats gained four seats, claiming the majority.

== Summary of results by state senate district ==
State Senate district	Incumbent	Party	Elected Senator	Party
1st	Troy Jackson	Democratic	Troy Jackson	Democratic
2nd	Michael E. Carpenter	Democratic	Michael E. Carpenter	Democratic
3rd	Rodney Whittemore	Republican	Brad Farrin	Republican
4th	Paul Davis	Republican	Paul Davis	Republican
5th	James Dill	Democratic	James Dill	Democratic
6th	Joyce Maker	Republican	Marianne Moore	Republican
7th	Brian Langley	Republican	Louis Luchini	Democratic
8th	Kimberley Rosen	Republican	Kimberley Rosen	Republican
9th	Geoffrey Gratwick	Democratic	Geoffrey Gratwick	Democratic
10th	Andre Cushing III	Republican	Stacey Guerin	Republican
11th	Michael Thibodeau	Republican	Erin Herbig	Democratic
12th	David Miramant	Democratic	David Miramant	Democratic
13th	Dana Dow	Republican	Dana Dow	Republican
14th	Shenna Bellows	Democratic	Shenna Bellows	Democratic
15th	Roger Katz	Republican	Matthew Pouliot	Republican
16th	Scott Cyrway	Republican	Scott Cyrway	Republican
17th	Tom Saviello	Republican	Russell Black	Republican
18th	Lisa Keim	Republican	Lisa Keim	Republican
19th	James Hamper	Republican	James Hamper	Republican
20th	Eric Brakey	Republican	Ned Claxton	Democratic
21st	Nate Libby	Democratic	Nate Libby	Democratic
22nd	Garrett Mason	Republican	Jeff Timberlake	Republican
23rd	Eloise Vitelli	Democratic	Eloise Vitelli	Democratic
24th	Everett "Brownie" Carson	Democratic	Everett "Brownie" Carson	Democratic
25th	Cathy Breen	Democratic	Cathy Breen	Democratic
26th	Bill Diamond	Democratic	Bill Diamond	Democratic
27th	Ben Chipman	Democratic	Ben Chipman	Democratic
28th	Mark Dion	Democratic	Heather Sanborn	Democratic
29th	Rebecca Millett	Democratic	Rebecca Millett	Democratic
30th	Amy Volk	Republican	Linda Sanborn	Democratic
31st	Justin Chenette	Democratic	Justin Chenette	Democratic
32nd	Susan Deschambault	Democratic	Susan Deschambault	Democratic
33rd	David Woodsome	Republican	David Woodsome	Republican
34th	Ronald Collins	Republican	Robert Foley	Republican
35th	Dawn Hill	Democratic	Mark Lawrence	Democratic

== Close races ==
Seats where the margin of victory was under 10%:

1. State Senate district 16, 0.80%
2. State Senate district 30, 0.88%
3. State Senate district 20, 1.32%
4. State Senate district 2, 1.42%
5. State Senate district 13, 1.92%
6. State Senate district 34, 3.36% (tipping point for supermajority)
7. State Senate district 17, 9.04%

== Predictions ==
Source	Ranking	As of
Governing	Tossup	October 8, 2018

== Detailed results by Maine State Senate district ==
=== District 1 ===
Maine Senate district 1 general election, 2018
Party	Candidate	Votes	%
Democratic	Troy Dale Jackson (incumbent)	8,793	60.74%
Republican	Michael Nadeau	5,683	39.26%
Total votes		14,476	100.0
Democratic hold			

=== District 2 ===
Maine Senate district 2 general election, 2018
Party	Candidate	Votes	%
Democratic	Michael Carpenter (incumbent)	7,433	50.71%
Republican	Karen Ann Reynolds	7,226	49.29%
Total votes		14,659	100.0
Democratic hold			

=== District 3 ===
Maine Senate district 3 general election, 2018
Party	Candidate	Votes	%
Republican	Brad Farrin	8,876	60.37%
Democratic	Jeffrey Johnson	5,827	39.63%
Total votes		14,703	100.0
Republican hold			

=== District 4 ===
Maine Senate district 4 general election, 2018
Party	Candidate	Votes	%
Republican	Paul T. Davis (incumbent)	9,895	65.94%
Democratic	Susan Mackey Andrews	5,112	34.06%
Total votes		15,007	100.0
Republican hold			

=== District 5 ===
Maine Senate district 5 general election, 2018
Party	Candidate	Votes	%
Democratic	James Dill (incumbent)	8,789	58.57%
Republican	Debbi Perkins	5,855	39.02%
Socialist	Maia Dendinger (Note: Listed on ballot as "Maine Socialist Party.")	1,124	7.49%
Total votes		15,768	100.0
Democratic hold			

=== District 6 ===
Maine Senate district 6 general election, 2018
Party	Candidate	Votes	%
Republican	Marianne Moore	8,979	61.33%
Democratic	Christina Therrien	5,661	38.67%
Total votes		14,640	100.0
Republican hold			

=== District 7 ===
Maine Senate district 7 general election, 2018
Party	Candidate	Votes	%
Democratic	Louis Luchini	13,363	62.21%
Republican	Richard Malaby	7,486	34.85%
Total votes		21,482	100.0
Democratic gain from Republican			

=== District 8 ===
Maine Senate district 8 general election, 2018
Party	Candidate	Votes	%
Republican	Kimberley Rosen (incumbent)	10,521	58.52%
Democratic	Beverly Uhlenhake	7,458	41.48%
Total votes		17,978	100.0
Republican hold			

=== District 9 ===
Maine Senate district 9 general election, 2018
Party	Candidate	Votes	%
Democratic	Geoffrey Gratwick (incumbent)	9,203	60.57%
Republican	James LaBrecque	5,990	39.43%
Total votes		15,193	100.0
Democratic hold			

=== District 10 ===
Maine Senate district 10 general election, 2018
Party	Candidate	Votes	%
Republican	Stacey Guerin	10,431	66.16%
Democratic	William Lippincott	5,336	33.84%
Total votes		15,767	100.0
Republican hold			

=== District 11 ===
Maine Senate district 11 general election, 2018
Party	Candidate	Votes	%
Democratic	Erin Herbig	11,659	58.99%
Republican	Jayne Crosby Giles	8,100	40.98%
Independent	Joseph H. Greenier (Note: Qualified write-in candidate)	7	0.03%
Total votes		19,766	100.0
Democratic gain from Republican			

=== District 12 ===
Maine Senate district 12 general election, 2018
Party	Candidate	Votes	%
Democratic	David Miramant (incumbent)	12,467	63.42%
Republican	Wendy Pelletier	7,192	36.58%
Total votes		19,659	100.0
Democratic hold			

=== District 13 ===
Maine Senate district 13 general election, 2018
Party	Candidate	Votes	%
Republican	Dana Dow (incumbent)	10,266	50.96%
Democratic	Laura Fortman	9,881	49.04%
Total votes		20,147	100.0
Republican hold			

=== District 14 ===
Maine Senate district 14 general election, 2018
Party	Candidate	Votes	%
Democratic	Shenna Bellows (incumbent)	10,790	57.89%
Republican	Matthew Stone	7,850	42.11%
Total votes		18,640	100.0
Democratic hold			

=== District 15 ===
Maine Senate district 15 general election, 2018
Party	Candidate	Votes	%
Republican	Matthew Pouliot	9,497	56.89%
Democratic	Kellie Julia	7,197	43.11%
Total votes		16,694	100.0
Republican hold			

=== District 16 ===
Maine Senate district 16 general election, 2018
Party	Candidate	Votes	%
Republican	Scott Cyrway (incumbent)	7,902	50.40%
Democratic	Karen Kusiak	7,778	49.60%
Total votes		15,680	100.0
Republican hold			

=== District 17 ===
Maine Senate district 17 general election, 2018
Party	Candidate	Votes	%
Republican	Russell Black	9,715	54.52%
Democratic	Jan Collins	8,105	45.48%
Total votes		17,820	100.0
Republican hold			

=== District 18 ===
Maine Senate district 18 general election, 2018
Party	Candidate	Votes	%
Republican	Lisa Keim (incumbent)	10,966	65.45%
Democratic	James Wilfong	5,789	34.55%
Total votes		16,755	100.0
Republican hold			

=== District 19 ===
Maine Senate district 19 general election, 2018
Party	Candidate	Votes	%
Republican	James Hamper (incumbent)	10,167	58.33%
Democratic	Michael McKinney	7,262	41.67%
Total votes		17,429	100.0
Republican hold			

=== District 20 ===
Maine Senate district 20 general election, 2018
Party	Candidate	Votes	%
Democratic	Ned Claxton	8,993	50.66%
Republican	Ellie Espling	8,758	49.34%
Total votes		17,751	100.0
Democratic gain from Republican			

=== District 21 ===
Maine Senate district 21 general election, 2018
Party	Candidate	Votes	%
Democratic	Nate Libby (incumbent)	8,210	60.42%
Republican	Nelson Peters, Jr.	5,378	39.58%
Total votes		13,588	100.0
Democratic hold			

=== District 22 ===
Maine Senate district 22 general election, 2018
Party	Candidate	Votes	%
Republican	Jeff Timberlake	10,572	62.75%
Democratic	Lois Kilby-Chesley	6,277	37.25%
Total votes		16,849	100.0
Republican hold			

=== District 23 ===
Maine Senate district 23 general election, 2018
Party	Candidate	Votes	%
Democratic	Eloise Vitelli (incumbent)	11,580	57.70%
Republican	Richard Donaldson	8,490	43.30%
Total votes		20,070	100.0
Democratic hold			

=== District 24 ===
Maine Senate district 24 general election, 2018
Party	Candidate	Votes	%
Democratic	Everett "Brownie" Carson (incumbent)	15,374	67.76%
Republican	Diana Garcia	7,315	32.24%
Total votes		22,689	100.0
Democratic hold			

=== District 25 ===
Maine Senate district 25 general election, 2018
Party	Candidate	Votes	%
Democratic	Cathy Breen (incumbent)	15,348	61.90%
Republican	Cathleen Nichols	9,448	38.10%
Total votes		24,796	100.0
Democratic hold			

=== District 26 ===
Maine Senate district 26 general election, 2018
Party	Candidate	Votes	%
Democratic	Bill Diamond (incumbent)	14,743	100.0
Total votes		14,743	100.0
Democratic hold			

=== District 27 ===
Maine Senate district 27 general election, 2018
Party	Candidate	Votes	%
Democratic	Ben Chipman (incumbent)	14,729	74.75%
Independent	Crystal Canney (Note: Listed on ballot as "Unenrolled, Independent.")	4,975	25.25%
Total votes		19,704	100.0
Democratic hold			

=== District 28 ===
Maine Senate district 28 general election, 2018
Party	Candidate	Votes	%
Democratic	Heather Sanborn	15,940	100.0
Total votes		15,940	100.0
Democratic hold			

=== District 29 ===
Maine Senate district 29 general election, 2018
Party	Candidate	Votes	%
Democratic	Rebecca Millett (incumbent)	15,077	74.30%
Republican	George Van Syckel	5,215	25.70%
Total votes		20,292	100.0
Democratic hold			

=== District 30 ===
Maine Senate district 30 general election, 2018
Party	Candidate	Votes	%
Democratic	Linda Sanborn	11,170	50.44%
Republican	Amy Volk (incumbent)	10,975	49.66%
Total votes		22,145	100.0
Democratic gain from Republican			

=== District 31 ===
Maine Senate district 31 general election, 2018
Party	Candidate	Votes	%
Democratic	Justin Chenette (incumbent)	12,122	66.48%
Republican	Stavros Mendros	6,113	33.52%
Total votes		18,235	100.0
Democratic hold			

=== District 32 ===
Maine Senate district 32 general election, 2018
Party	Candidate	Votes	%
Democratic	Susan Deschambault (incumbent)	10,620	62.63%
Republican	Scott Normandeau	6,338	37.37%
Total votes		16,958	100.0
Democratic hold			

=== District 33 ===
Maine Senate district 33 general election, 2018
Party	Candidate	Votes	%
Republican	David Woodsome (incumbent)	9,030	58.91%
Democratic	John Tuttle	6,298	41.09%
Total votes		15,328	100.0
Republican hold			

=== District 34 ===
Maine Senate district 34 general election, 2018
Party	Candidate	Votes	%
Republican	Robert Foley	10,456	51.68%
Democratic	Thomas Wright	9,776	48.32%
Total votes		20,232	100.0
Republican hold			

=== District 35 ===
Maine Senate district 35 general election, 2018
Party	Candidate	Votes	%
Democratic	Mark Lawrence	13,408	62.48%
Republican	Michael Estes	8,050	37.52%
Total votes		21,458	100.0
Democratic hold			

== See also ==
- United States elections, 2018
- United States Senate election in Maine, 2018
- United States House of Representatives elections in Maine, 2018
- Maine gubernatorial election, 2018
- Maine House of Representatives election, 2018
- Maine Question 1, June 2018
- List of Maine state legislatures
