= Maine's 11th State Senate district =

American legislative district

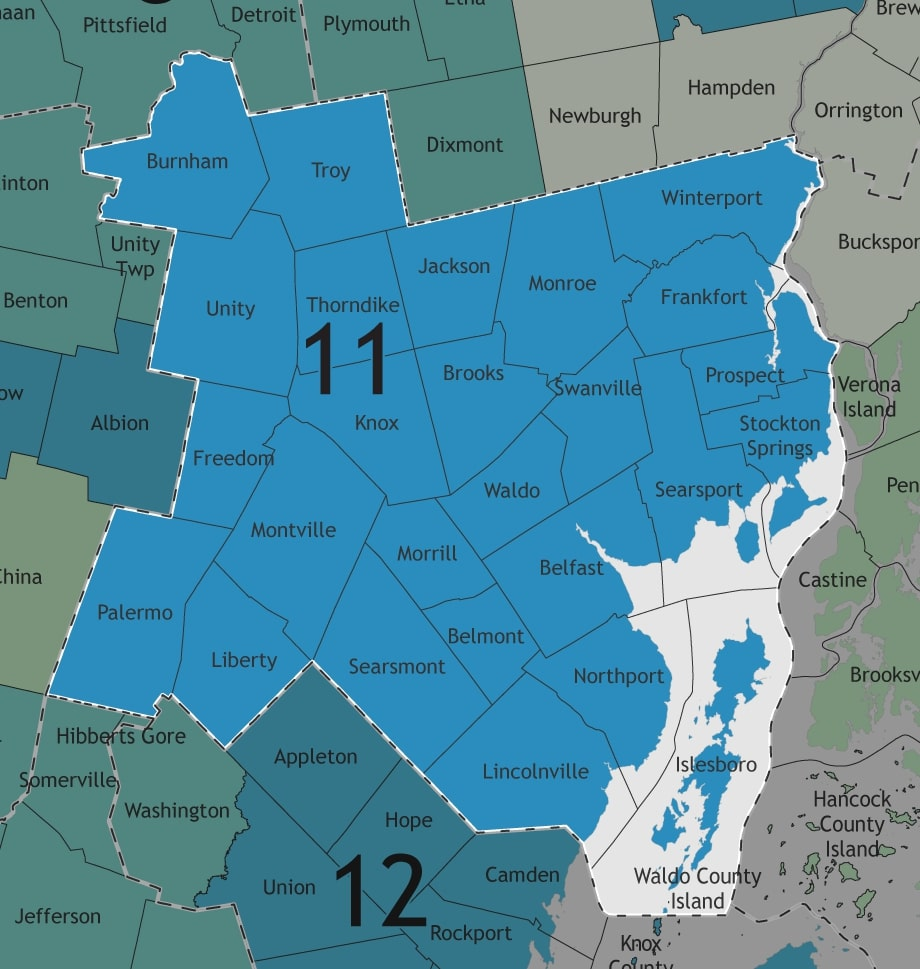
Senator
Chip Curry; D–Belfast
- Registration: 34.4% Democratic; 26.9% Republican; 36.7% No party preference
- Population (2020): 40,006

Maine's 11th State Senate district is one of 35 districts in the Maine Senate. It has been represented by Democrat Chip Curry since 2020.

== Geography ==
District 11 comprises the entirety of Waldo County.

Waldo County - 100% of county

== Recent election results ==
=== 2022 ===
2022 Maine State Senate election, District 11
Party	Candidate	Votes	%
Democratic	Glen 'Chip' Curry	11,543	55.3
Republican	MaryAnne Kinney	9,312	44.7
Total votes		20,855	100.0
Democratic hold			

Elections prior to 2022 were held under different district lines.

=== 2024 ===
2024 Maine State Senate election, District 11
Party	Candidate	Votes	%
Democratic	Glen 'Chip' Curry	13,761	56.1
Republican	Richard Meyer	10,775	43.9
Total votes		24,536	100.0
Democratic hold			

== Historical election results ==
=== 2012 ===
2012 Maine State Senate election, District 11
Party	Candidate	Votes	%
Independent	Richard G. Woodbury	13,117	52.9
Republican	Christopher Tyll	11,687	47.1
Total votes		24,804	100
Independent hold			

=== 2014 ===
2014 Maine State Senate election, District 11
Party	Candidate	Votes	%
Republican	Michael Thibodeau	9,109	48.8
Democratic	Jonathon Fulford	8,974	48.1
Blank votes	None	584	3.1
Total votes		18,667	100
Republican hold			

=== 2016 ===
2018 Maine State Senate election, District 11
Party	Candidate	Votes	%
Republican	Michael Thibodeau	11,947	51.8
Democratic	Jonathon Fulford	11,138	48.2
Total votes		23,058	100
Republican hold			

=== 2018 ===
2018 Maine State Senate election, District 11
Party	Candidate	Votes	%
Democratic	Erin Herbig	11,659	59
Republican	Jayne Crosby Giles	8,100	41
Total votes		19,759	100
Democratic gain from Republican			

=== 2020 ===
2020 Maine State Senate election, District 11
Party	Candidate	Votes	%
Democratic	Glen 'Chip' Curry	12,789	54.2
Republican	Duncan Milne	10,826	45.8
Total votes		23,615	100
Democratic hold			
