= Senator Sanborn =

Senator Sanborn may refer to:

- Alan Sanborn (born 1957), Michigan State Senate
- Albert W. Sanborn (1853–1937), Wisconsin State Senate
- Andy Sanborn (fl. 2010s), New Hampshire State Senate
- Heather Sanborn (fl. 2010s), Maine State Senate
- John B. Sanborn (1826–1904), Minnesota State Senate
- Linda Sanborn (born 1951), Maine State Senate
