= Maine's 28th State Senate District =

American legislative district

Maine's 28th State Senate district
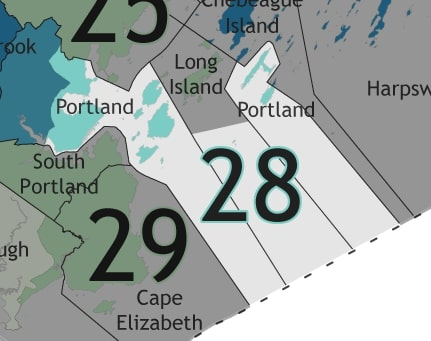
Senator
Rachel Talbot Ross; D–Portland
- Population (2020): 38,236

Maine's 28th State Senate district is one of 35 districts in the Maine Senate. It has been represented by former Speaker of the Maine House of Representatives, Democrat Rachel Talbot Ross since 2024

== Geography ==
District 28 represents a small part of Cumberland County, being entirely made up of the majority of its county seat (and most populous city of the state) of Portland. It also includes a portion of the water of the Gulf of Maine, namely Casco Bay.

Cumberland County - 12.6% of county

== Recent election results ==
=== 2022 ===
2022 Maine State Senate election, District 28
Party	Candidate	Votes	%
Democratic	Benjamin Chipman	15,551	87.3
Republican	Susan M. Abercrombie	2,254	12.7
Total votes		18,266	100.0
Democratic hold			

Elections prior to 2022 were held under different district lines.

=== 2024 ===
2024 Maine State Senate election, District 28
Party	Candidate	Votes	%
Democratic	Rachel Talbot Ross	18,524	100%
Total votes		18,524	100.0
Democratic hold			

== Historical election results ==
=== 2012 ===
2012 Maine State Senate election, District 28
Party	Candidate	Votes	%
Republican	Brian Langley	10,953	51.1
Democratic	David White	10,500	48.9
Total votes		21,453	100
Republican hold			

=== 2014 ===
2014 Maine State Senate election, District 28 (Note: This election was a Democratic Hold, as Alfond had been redistricted from the 9th district in early 2014)
Party	Candidate	Votes	%
Democratic	Anne Haskel	11,934	66.1
Green	Owen Hill	4,185	23.2
Blank votes	None	1,923	10.7
Total votes		18,042	100
Democratic hold			

=== 2016 ===
2016 Maine State Senate election, District 28
Party	Candidate	Votes	%
Democratic	Mark Dion	15,375	71.4
Republican	Karen Usher	6,161	28.4
Total votes		21,536	100
Democratic hold			

=== 2018 ===
2018 Maine State Senate election, District 28
Party	Candidate	Votes	%
Democratic	Heather Sanborn	15,940	81
Write-in		3,729	19
Total votes		19,669	100
Democratic hold			

=== 2020 ===
2020 Maine State Senate election, District 28
Party	Candidate	Votes	%
Democratic	Heather Sanborn	20,173	100%
Total votes		20,173	100
Democratic hold			
