= Rachel Talbot Ross =

American politician from Maine (born 1961)

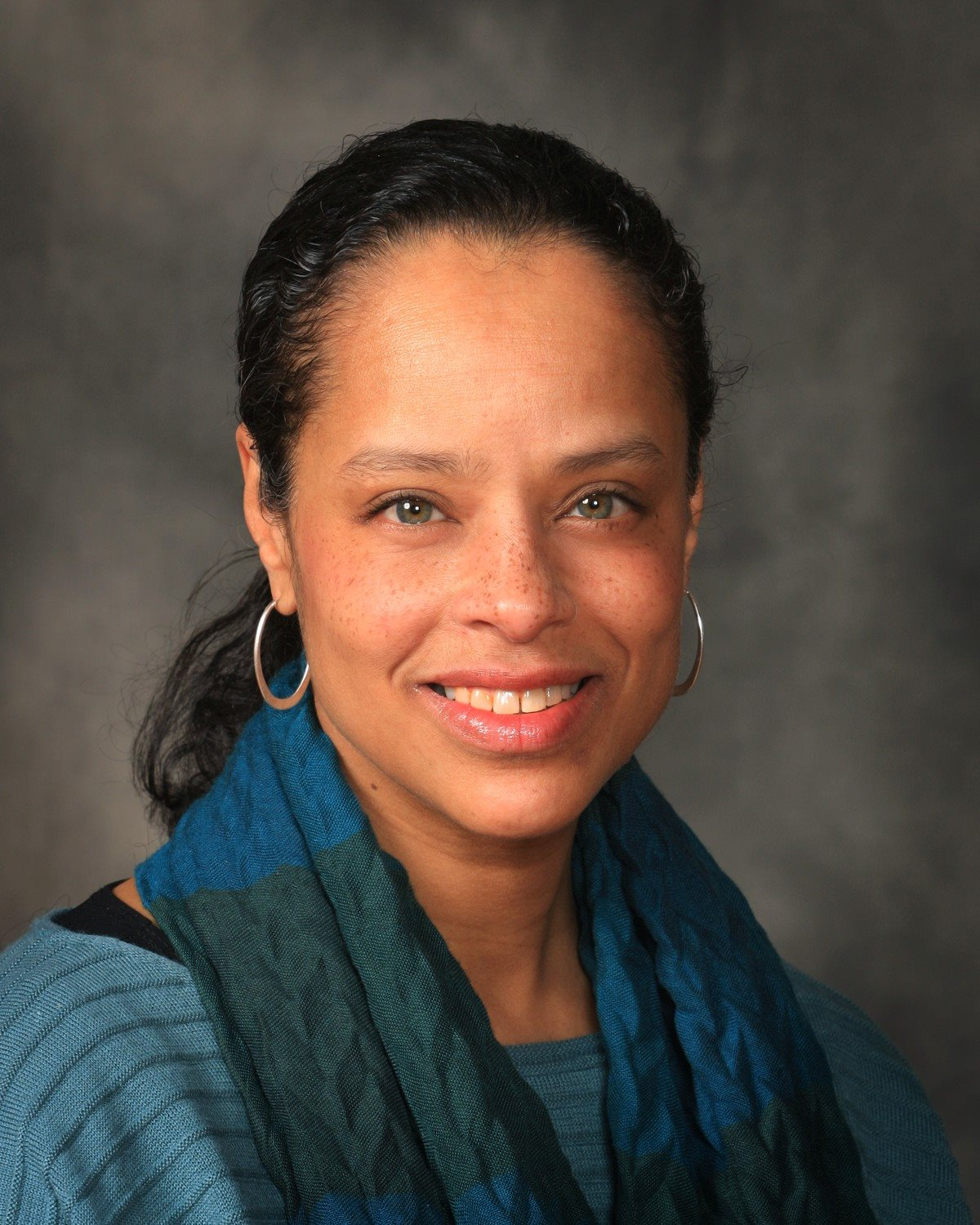
- Official portrait, 2018

Member of the Maine Senate from the 28th district
- Incumbent
- Assumed office December 4, 2024
- Preceded by: Ben Chipman

104th Speaker of the Maine House of Representatives
- In office December 7, 2022 – December 4, 2024
- Preceded by: Ryan Fecteau
- Succeeded by: Ryan Fecteau

Member of the Maine House of Representatives
- In office December 7, 2016 – December 4, 2024
- Preceded by: Ben Chipman
- Succeeded by: Yusuf M. Yusuf
- Constituency: 40th district (2016–2022); 118th district (2022–2024)

Personal details
- Born: 1961 (age 64–65)
- Party: Democratic
- Relatives: Gerald Talbot (father)
- Education: American University (attended); Wesleyan University (attended)

Rachel Talbot Ross (born 1961) is an American politician and civil rights advocate. A Democrat from Portland, she is the State Senator for Maine's 28th State Senate District, elected unopposed in 2024.

In 2016, Talbot Ross became the first Black woman elected to the Maine Legislature with her election to the Maine House of Representatives. She later served as the 104th Speaker of the Maine House of Representatives from December 2022 to December 2024, becoming the highest-ranking Black officeholder in the state’s history.

Talbot Ross is the daughter of Gerald Talbot, Maine’s first Black legislator. She served eight years in the Maine House, including a term as assistant majority leader, before her election to the state Senate. During her legislative career, she sponsored legislation related to criminal justice policy and authored legislation requiring racial impact assessments for new laws in Maine.

== Early life and education ==
Talbot Ross grew up in Portland, Maine. She is the daughter of Anita and Gerald Talbot and has three sisters. Her father was the first person of color elected to the Maine Legislature. Talbot Ross is a ninth-generation Maine resident.

Talbot Ross attended Wesleyan University and American University. For 21 years, she worked for the City of Portland as the Director of Equal Opportunity and Multicultural Affairs, resigning in 2015 following a leave of absence. She served as president of the Portland branch of the NAACP, which disbanded in 2013; as of 2021, she was working with local leaders to reestablish the chapter.

Talbot Ross helped direct the Maine Freedom Trails project, the first phase of which opened in 2006. She co-founded the Martin Luther King Jr. Fellows program with Portland city councilor Pious Ali, a youth-led racial justice initiative for high school students of color in Portland.

Talbott Ross has described herself as a prison abolitionist and has advocated for incarcerated individuals in Maine.

== Political career ==
Talbot Ross was first elected in 2016 to represent Maine House District 40. She won the Democratic primary against Herb Adams and Anna Kellar, and after Republican candidate Carol Taylor withdrew in late September, Talbot Ross received all votes cast in the general election.

In 2018, she was again challenged in the Democratic primary by Adams and won 75%–25%. She faced no opponent in the general election and was seated for a second term. She faced no opponents in either the primary or general elections in 2020 and was elected to a third term on November 3, 2020. Later that month, House Democrats unanimously selected her as assistant majority leader, making her the first Black legislator in Maine to hold a leadership position.

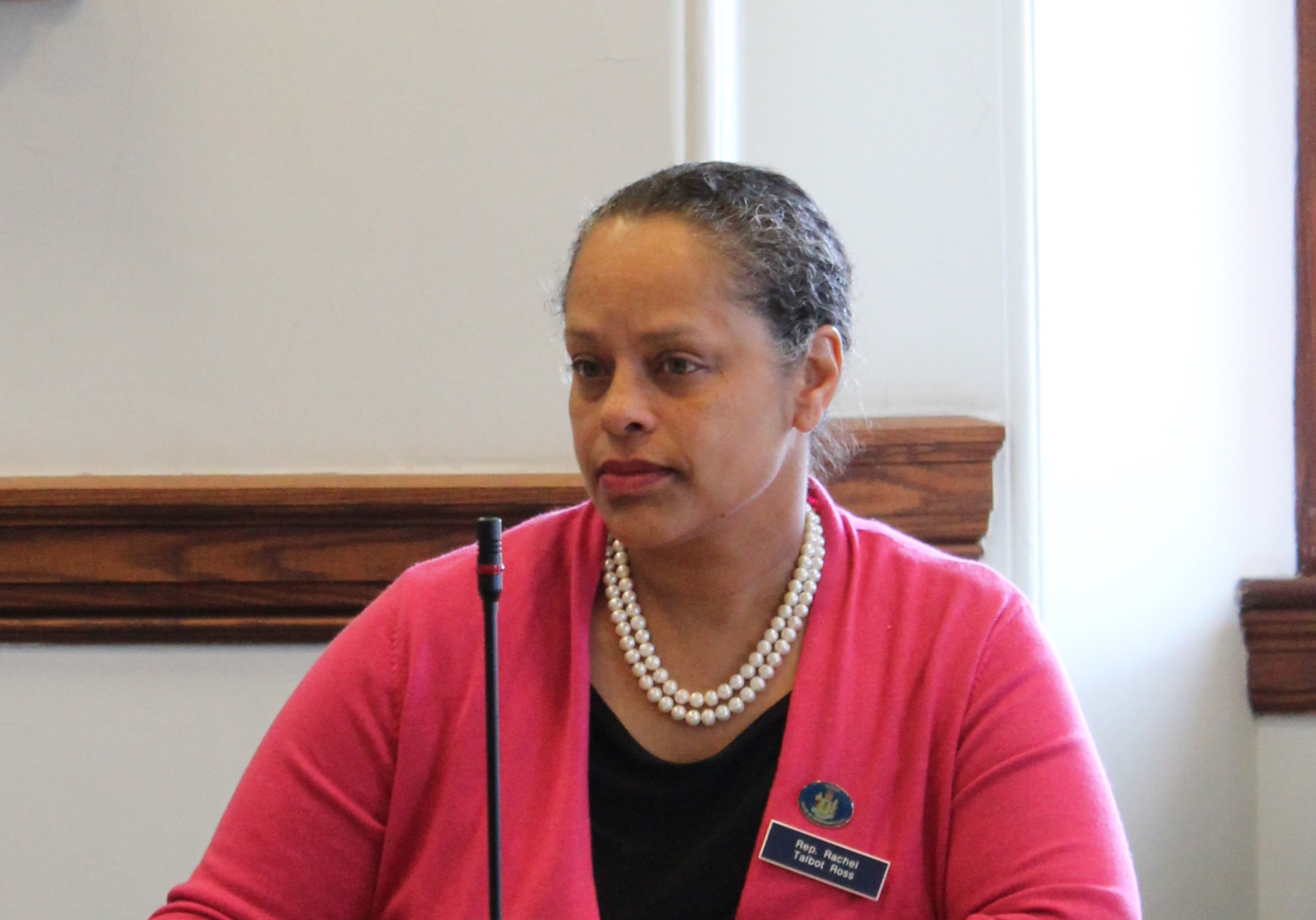
Talbot Ross in 2018

During her tenure, Talbot Ross served on the Judiciary, Health and Human Services, and Criminal Justice and Public Safety committees, as well as the Maine State Advisory Committee to the United States Commission on Civil Rights. She chairs the Permanent Commission on the Status of Racial, Indigenous and Maine Tribal Population, which she helped establish through legislation enacted in 2019, and is a member of the Legislative Council.

In the 130th Legislature, Talbott Ross introduced LD 2, An Act To Require the Inclusion of Racial Impact Statements in the Legislative Process. The bill passed both chambers on March 12, 2021, and was signed into law by Governor Janet Mills on March 17. The law requires new legislation in Maine to be evaluated for potential impacts on historically marginalized groups, making Maine the eighth U.S. state to adopt such a policy.

With Speaker Ryan Fecteau term-limited in 2022, Maine Democrats nominated Talbot Ross as Speaker on November 18, 2022. She was elected when the legislature convened on December 7. After reaching term limits in the Maine House in 2024, she was elected unopposed to the Maine State Senate.

In February 2023, President Joe Biden and Vice President Kamala Harris recognized Black state house speakers, including Talbot Ross, during a Black History Month event at the White House.

== Awards and honors ==
- 2006 EqualityMaine Bayard Rustin award for collaborative movement-building
- 2009 Roger Baldwin award, Maine Civil Liberties Union
- 2014 Deborah Morton Award, University of New England
- 2020 Gerda Haas award from the Holocaust and Human Rights Center of Maine for work on human rights reforms
- 2020 Emerge Maine Woman of the Year

== Electoral history ==
2016 Maine House District 40 Democratic Primary
Party	Candidate	Votes	%
Democratic	Rachel Talbot Ross	199	37.8%
Democratic	Herbert Adams	171	32.5%
Democratic	Anna Kellar	156	29.7
Total votes		526	100.0%

2016 Maine House District 40 General Election
Party	Candidate	Votes	%
Democratic	Rachel Talbot Ross	3,156	100.0%
Republican	Carol Taylor (Note: Taylor dropped out of the race too late to be removed from the general election ballot; votes cast for Taylor were regarded by the Secretary of State's office as blank.)	0	0%
Total votes		3,156	100.0%
Democratic hold			

2018 Maine House District 40 Democratic Primary
Party	Candidate	Votes	%
Democratic	Rachel Talbot Ross	811	75.7%
Democratic	Herbert Adams	260	24.3
Total votes		1,071	100.0%

2018 Maine House District 40 General Election
Party	Candidate	Votes	%
Democratic	Rachel Talbot Ross	3,134	85.7%
Write-in		523	14.3%
Total votes		3,657	100.0%
Democratic hold			

2020 Maine Maine House District 40 General Election
Party	Candidate	Votes	%
Democratic	Rachel Talbot Ross	3,885	100.0%
Total votes		3,885	100.0%
Democratic hold			

== Notes ==
Political offices
Preceded by Ryan Fecteau	Speaker of the Maine House of Representatives; 2022–2024	Succeeded by Ryan Fecteau
