= Sean Flaherty =

Sean, Shaun or Shawn Flaherty may refer to:

== People ==
- Sean Flaherty (politician) (born 1985), American politician
- Shawn Flaherty, American politician in office in 2006
- Sean Patrick Flaherty, American actor and producer

== Fictional characters ==
- Sean Flaherty (EastEnders), on the soap opera EastEnders
- Shaun Flaherty, in Best Friends Together
