= Chip Curry =

American politician

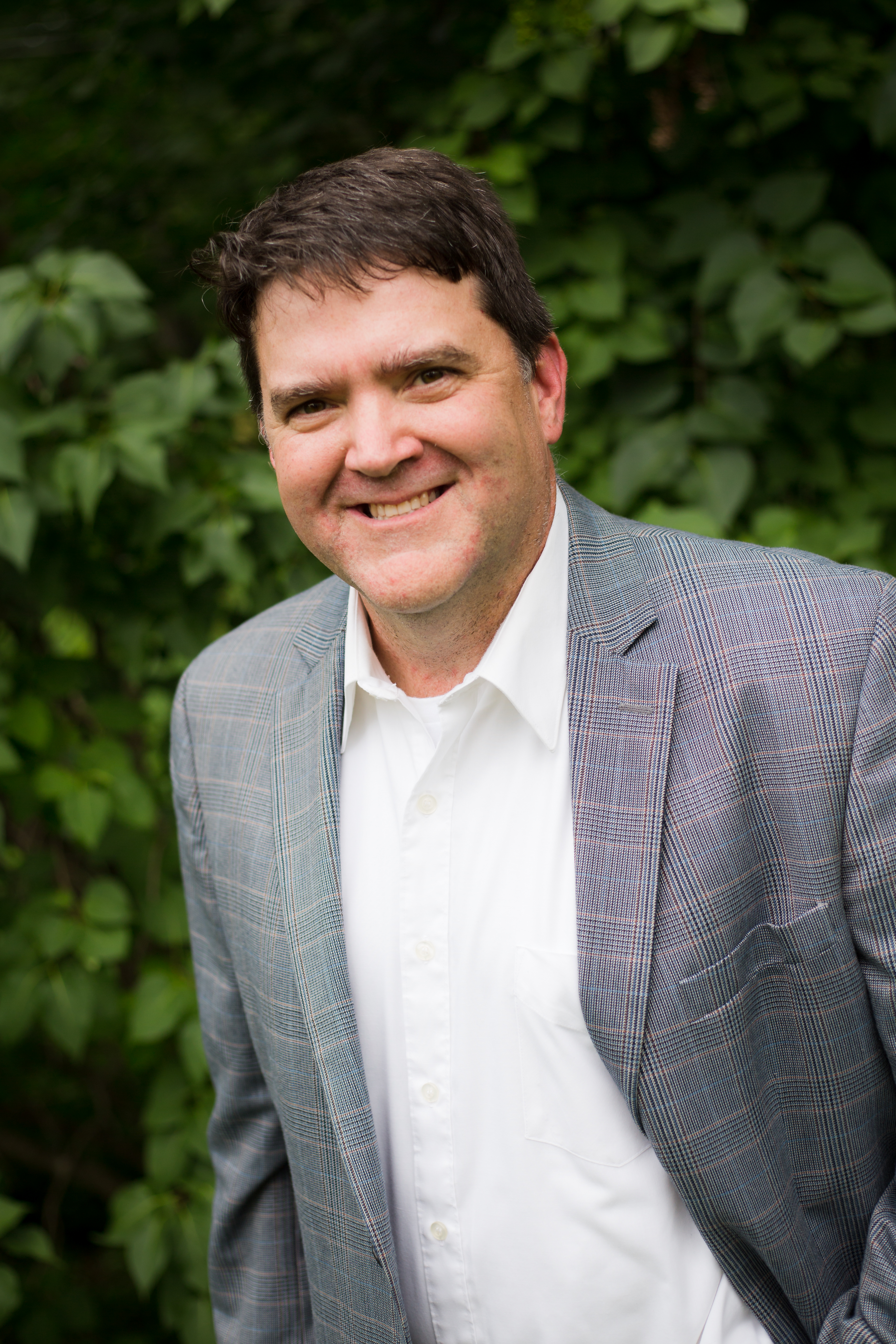

Member of the Maine Senate from the 11th district
- Incumbent
- Assumed office December 2020
- Preceded by: Erin Herbig

Personal details
- Party: Democratic
- Spouse: Christi Goosman
- Children: 1
- Occupation: Student services coordinator
- Website: https://chip.mainecandidate.com/

Glenn "Chip" Curry is an American Democratic politician and youth advocate currently serving as the Maine State Senator for District 11. He has represented Waldo County in the State Senate since 2020 and is the student services coordinator at the University of Maine at Augusta (UMA)'s Rockland center.

== Early life and education ==
Curry has worked in education and youth development since 1992, earning a Master of Science in College Student Personnel Services from Miami University in 1994. He moved to Waldo County the same year and worked as an academic advisor and student activities coordinator at Unity College and as an AmeriCorps VISTA project coordinator for the USM Edmund Muskie School of Public Service. Curry served on several task forces and statewide youth advocacy groups during this time, and in 2013 was hired as the student services coordinator at the University of Maine at Augusta center in Rockland.

== Maine Senate ==
Curry first ran for Maine Senate in 2012 when he sought to unseat Republican incumbent Michael Thibodeau in then-district 23. He ran unopposed in the Democratic primary but lost 54%-46% in the general election.

In March 2020, Curry announced that he would run to fill Senate District 11 seat being vacated by Erin Herbig, who had been hired to be the Belfast city manager and therefore did not seek re-election. He defeated two opponents in two rounds of the ranked-choice Democratic primary and defeated Republican Duncan Milne 54%-46% in the general election.

As of 2021, he is a member of the Inland Fisheries and Wildlife committee and chair of Joint Committee on Innovation, Development, Economic Advancement and Business.

== Personal life ==
Curry has been married to his wife Christi, a teacher, since 1995. The Currys have one daughter. Curry is a "proud member" of the Belfast Curling Club and the Northport Golf Club and serves as co-chair of the UMA Professional Employees Association. He has volunteered as a set builder for the Searsport District High School theater department since 1996.

== Electoral record ==
2012 Maine Senate District 23 Democratic primary
Party	Candidate	Votes	%
Democratic	Chip Curry		100%
Total votes			100.0%

2012 Maine Senate District 23 General Election
Party	Candidate	Votes	%
Republican	Michael Thibodeau	10,747	53.6%
Democratic	Chip Curry	9,306	46.4%
Total votes		20,053	100.0%

2020 Maine Senate District 11 Democratic primary: Ranked choice round 1
Party	Candidate	Votes	%
Democratic	Chip Curry	1,858	44.6%
Democratic	Robyn Stanicki	1,280	30.7%
Democratic	Charles Pattavina	1,030	24.7%
Total votes		4,168	100.0%

2020 Maine Senate District 11 Democratic primary: Ranked choice round 2
Party	Candidate	Votes	%
Democratic	Chip Curry	2,244	56.7%
Democratic	Robyn Stanicki	1,711	43.3%
Total votes		4,168	100.0%

2020 Maine Senate District 11 general election
Party	Candidate	Votes	%
Democratic	Chip Curry	12,789	54.2%
Republican	Duncan Milne	10,826	45.8%
Total votes		23,615	100.0%

2022 Maine Senate District 11 Democratic primary
Party	Candidate	Votes	%
Democratic	Chip Curry	1,818	100.0%
Total votes		1,818	100.0%

2022 Maine State Senate District 11 general election
Party	Candidate	Votes	%
Democratic	Chip Curry (incumbent)	11,478	55%
Republican	MaryAnne Kinney	9,308	45%
Total votes		20,786	100%
