= Gerald Talbot =

American politician (1931–2026)

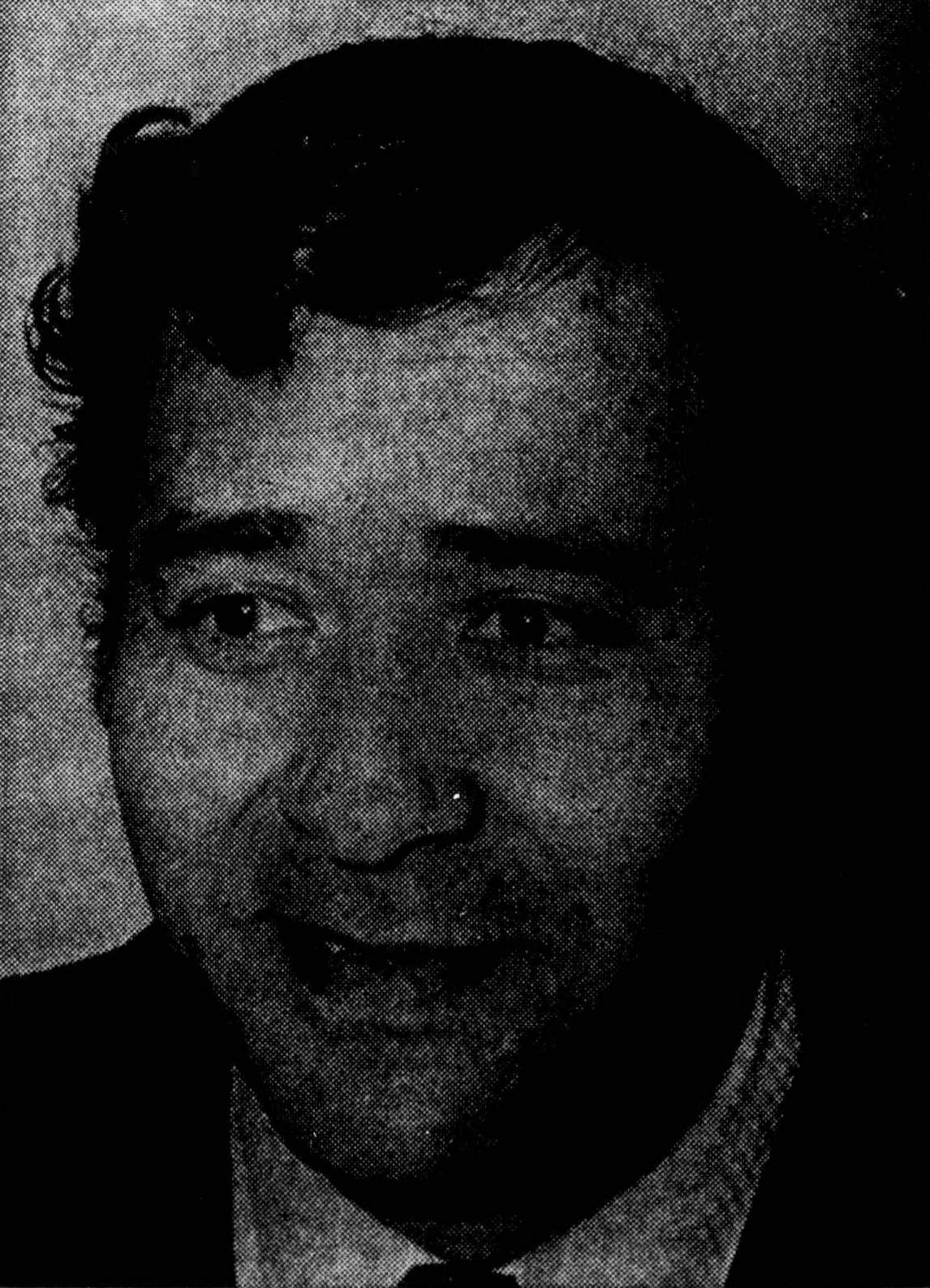
- Talbot in 1972

Member of the Maine House of Representatives from the Portland at-large district
- In office 1972–1978

Personal details
- Born: Gerald Edgerton Talbot; October 28, 1931 Bangor, Maine, U.S.
- Died: May 9, 2026 (aged 94)
- Party: Democratic
- Spouse: Anita Cummings (m. 1954)
- Children: 4, including Rachel Talbot Ross

Gerald Edgerton Talbot (October 28, 1931 – May 9, 2026) was an American civil rights leader, author, and politician from Portland, Maine. He was the first Black legislator to serve in the state of Maine, the founding president of the Portland, Maine, chapter of the National Association for the Advancement of Colored People (NAACP), and was president of the Maine State Board of Education under Governor Joseph Brennan. In 2020, the Riverton elementary school in Portland was renamed the Gerald Edgerton Talbot Community School.

== Early life ==
=== Childhood in Bangor ===
Talbot was born in Bangor, Maine, on October 28, 1931, to Wilmont Edgerton Talbot, the head chef at the Bangor House Hotel, and Arvella Luella (McIntyre) Talbot, a homemaker and community organizer. He was the eldest of five children and an eighth-generation Mainer. Talbot traced his ancestry to black Revolutionary War veteran Abraham Talbett.

He attended Hannibal Hamlin Grammar School, Lagen Street Grammar School, and Bangor High School, graduating in 1952. He recalled meeting his eventual wife, Anita Cummings, while playing football for Bangor High School.

=== Military service ===
After graduating, Talbot worked at the Bangor House alongside his father and then moved to Cummings's hometown of Portland, Maine. He desired to serve in the military, as no immediate family members had done so. Talbot attempted to enlist in the Marines but was rejected for color-blindness, so he returned to Bangor and enlisted in the United States Army in 1953.

Talbot was assigned to Fort Dix and then Fort Devens outside of Boston. He filed two requests to be sent to Korea, but was rejected both times and sent to Tulle, Greenland where he served for a full year.

=== Portland ===
Upon discharge from the Army following his Tulle assignment, Talbot and his wife settled in Portland. The family's consistent struggle to obtain housing in Portland inspired Talbot's livelong advocacy for fair housing laws.

In 1956, Talbot worked at the Community Center on Free Street in Portland as a fireman and housekeeper/custodian, spending several years between various jobs. In a 2021 interview, he explained that as a "light-skinned Black", many employers "did not know what I was, but when they found it out, because if they ever asked, they did ask, they said, 'What are you?' Two days later, I was gone. I didn't have a job anymore."

In 1964, Talbot ran the printing press at the Maine Printing Company, and in 1966 began working for the Guy Gannett Publishing Company, where he remained until his retirement in 1991.

== Activism ==
Talbot was one of several Maine residents to attend the 1963 March on Washington. He wrote and spoke about the experience's impact on his political goals and activism, and in 2013 he told Maine's The Free Press, "At the end, there were four or five things we had to do after. We had to go home and tell everyone we were at the march, and we had to fight for jobs and education. And that's what most of us in that march did."

Talbot helped organize the Portland chapter of the NAACP in 1964 and was elected its founding president, serving 1964–1966. Peers described him as a "logical choice" due to his reputation as an activist, his previous NAACP involvement, and the fact that he was born and raised in Maine. Soon after its official organization, Talbot and chapter treasurer Linwood Young traveled to Washington, D.C., to represent it at the annual NAACP convention.

Talbot was instrumental in the passage of the Maine Fair Housing Bill in 1965. Housing discrimination was a significant struggle for Mainers in the early 1960s, and NAACP chapters statewide began advocating for fair housing legislation beginning in 1963. The new Portland branch, as well as national civil rights momentum, allowed Talbot and other Maine activists to make strides toward new legislation, and in 1965 David Graham of Freeport and Rodney Ross of Bath, members of Maine's 102nd Legislature, sponsored "An Act Relating to Discrimination in Housing." The bill passed the legislature, and in May 1965 Talbot and other key advocates stood beside Governor John Reed as he signed it into law.

In 1968, Talbot successfully sued a landlord for housing discrimination. The Superior Court case was the first under Maine's new Fair Housing Law, and the landlord was fined $75.

Throughout the 1960s, Talbot traveled throughout the United States to help register voters and connect with other civil rights leaders, including an impactful trip to Laurel, Mississippi, in 1965.

In 1968, Governor Ken Curtis appointed Talbot to a state human rights task force. Talbot also served two more terms as the president of the Portland NAACP 1970–1971 and 1978–1980, and was a vice president of the New England Regional NAACP.

In 2006, Talbot co-authored the first book-length examination of African-American history in Maine along with H. H. (Harriet) Price. Maine's Visible Black History: The First Chronicle of Its People.

== Political career ==
=== Election ===
In 1972, after watching a debate on Maine's Human Rights Act on the floor of the Maine Legislature, Talbot observed one lawmaker argue that "poor people should struggle." Talbot decided more representation was needed in the Legislature and considered running. He recalled making a final decision days before nomination papers were due.

The 1972 Portland Democratic legislative ballot contained the names of more than twenty at-large{ candidates in alphabetical order, of which Talbot was listed second-to-last. Voters were asked to select eleven. According to a New York Times article about his historic victory, Talbot won by about 1,700 votes "although his district, in Portland, could muster no more than 250 black voters." Talbot became the first Black person ever elected to the Maine legislature.

=== Maine House of Representatives ===
Talbot became the first Black chair of a legislative committee when he chaired the Human Resources Committee for two terms. He was also the first Black speaker pro-tem of the Maine House of Representatives. He served three terms, ending in 1978. In order to keep his insurance and contract with his job at Gannett Publishing, Talbot was required to work at least five hours each night at the printing company while he served in the Legislature. In a 2001 interview, Talbot described leaving Portland for Augusta around 7:00 am, returning anywhere from 6:30–9:00 pm, and then working a five-hour shift at Gannett before returning home to sleep. Talbot sponsored the first gay rights legislation in Maine, the 1977 "Sexual or Affectional Preference" (1977) amendment to the Maine Human Rights Act. He also sponsored "An Act to Prohibit the Use of Offensive Names for Geographic Features and Other Places in the State of Maine", which passed, eliminating the n-word from a dozen place names in the state. Other notable legislation of Talbot's addressed conditions and treatment for migrant workers, indigenous sovereignty, fair housing, and recognizing Martin Luther King Jr. Day as a state holiday.

=== Post-legislature ===
Talbot served on the Maine State Board of Education 1980–1984 and was the chair during his final year. He was also a member of the New England States Board of Education Commission during that time. He also served on the Maine Vocational Technical Institute's Board of Trustees, the Board of Trustees of the University of New England, the Maine State Committee on Aging, and the Minority Affairs committee for the American Association of Retired Persons (AARP) on both the local and national levels. Talbot joined the Muskie Board of Visitors at the University of Southern Maine in 1990.

== Personal life and death ==
Talbot married Anita Cummings in 1954, while Talbot was still in the Army. They had four daughters: Sharon Renee Verloo, Rachel Talbot Ross, Regina Phillips, and Robin Talbot. While she was at Smith College in 1978, Sharon Talbot worked for Senator Edmund Muskie while he was chair of the Senate budget committee. Rachel Talbot Ross was elected to the Maine House of Representatives from Portland in 2016, 2018, 2020 and 2022. After the 2022 election, Rachel was elected Speaker of the Maine House of Representatives by her peers in the Maine House, becoming the first African-American to hold that position. In 2024, she was elected to the Maine State Senate. Regina Phillips is an adjunct professor of social work at the University of Southern Maine, a nonprofit co-founder and a grant writer and community engagement coordinator for the Westbrook school department. In 2022, Regina was elected to the Portland City Council.

Talbot died on May 9, 2026, at the age of 94.

== Honors and awards ==
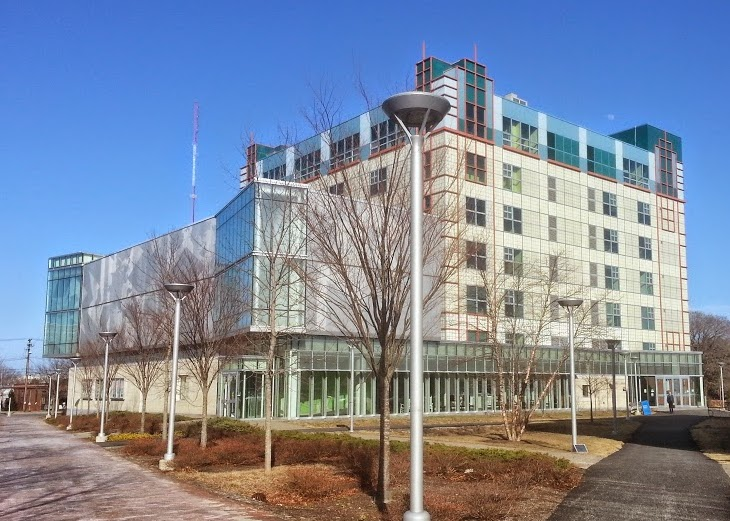
The Talbot collection resides at the University of Southern Maine's Jean Byers Sampson Center for Diversity in Maine at the Glickman Library in Portland.

Throughout his life, Talbot collected books, posters, photographs and other artifacts, as well as personal papers and records, to help document Black history in Maine and throughout the United States. He often travelled the state with the collection, visiting schools, community centers and churches and creating an annual display in the rotunda of the Maine State House. In 1995, Talbot donated his collection to the Special Collections of the University of Southern Maine, where it is part of the African American Collection of the Jean Byers Sampson Center for Diversity in Maine.

In 1980, Talbot received a regional Jefferson Award for Public Service.

USM presented Talbot with an Honorary Doctorate in Humane Letters in 1995 and dedicated an auditorium in his name, which was then the only public space in Maine named after a Black person. On September 10, 2019, the university held a ceremony to announce the creation of the Talbot Fellowship. Lance Gibbs, Ph.D., served the first three-year term as Talbot Fellow studying race in Maine.

Talbot received a Jean Byers Sampson Center for Diversity in Maine Lifetime Achievement Award in 2010.

Two days after his 90th birthday in 2021, Second Street Park in Bangor was renamed Talbot Park at a ceremony where Talbot was also given the keys to the city.

=== Gerald E. Talbot Community School ===
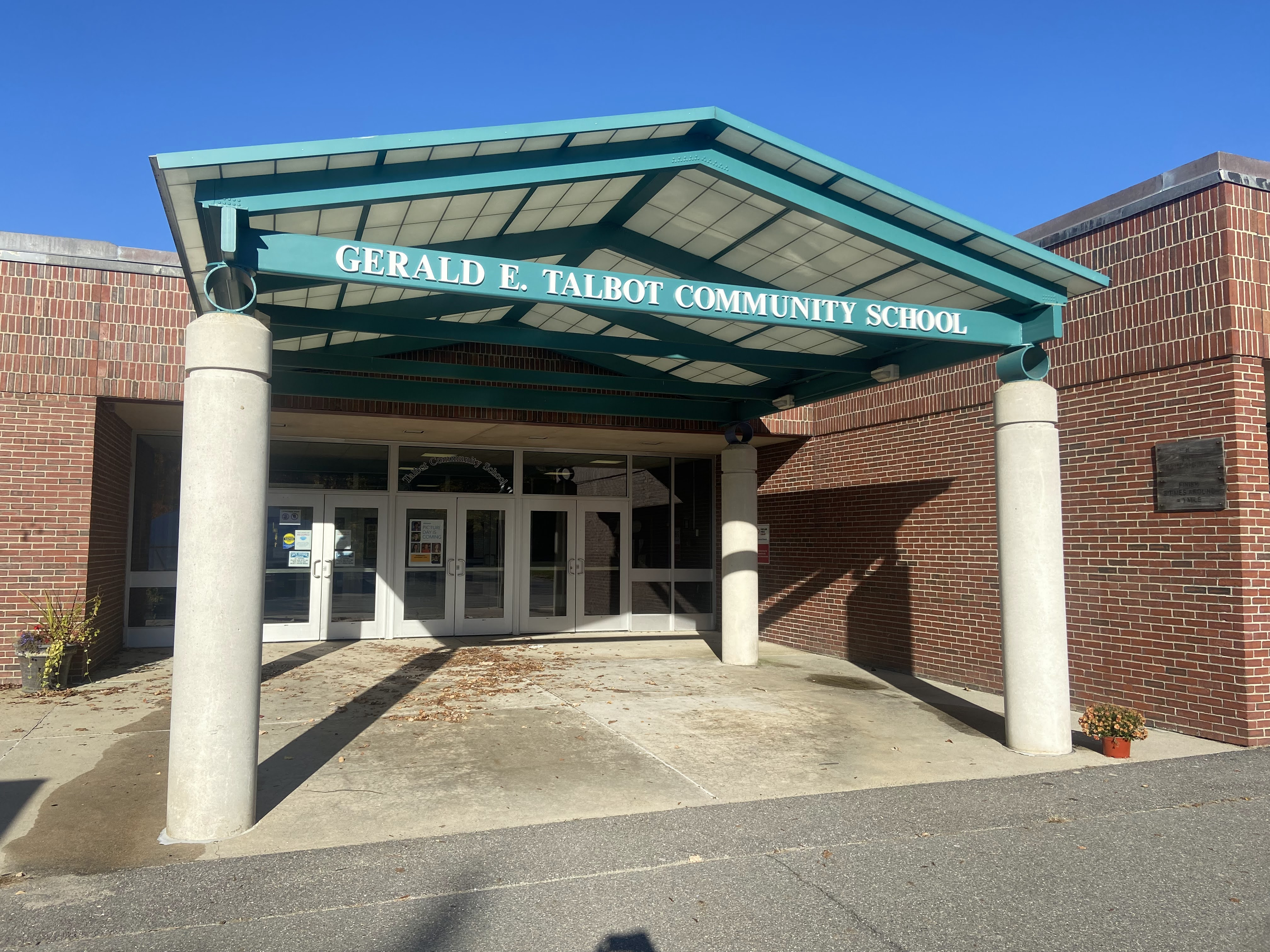
The Gerald E. Talbot Community School is in the Riverton neighborhood of Portland, Maine.

In February 2019, the Portland City Council sent a letter to the Portland School Board requesting that they consider renaming one of Portland's elementary schools in Talbot's honor. On February 5, 2020, the Portland School Board voted unanimously to change the name of Riverton Elementary School to the Gerald E. Talbot Community School. On Monday, August 31, 2020, the school was officially renamed in a ribbon-cutting ceremony. Gerald Talbot and his grandson, Demetrius Brown-Phillips, who was also a student at the school, did the honors.

== Books ==
- Maine's Visible Black History: The First Chronicle of Its People by H. H. Price and Gerald E. Talbot, with 42 contributing writers. Tilbury House Publishers. ISBN 978-0-88448-275-8.
