= Janice Dodge =

American politician and former educator

Member of the Maine House of Representatives from the 97th district
- Incumbent
- Assumed office December 5, 2018
- Preceded by: Erin Herbig
- Succeeded by: Madison Cook (elect)

Personal details
- Born: Belfast, Maine, U.S.
- Party: Democratic
- Education: University of Michigan (BM)

Janice S. Dodge is an American politician and former educator serving as a member of the Maine House of Representatives from the 97th district. She assumed office on December 5, 2018.

== Early life and education ==
Dodge was born and raised in Belfast, Maine. After graduating from Belfast Area High School, she earned a Bachelor of Music degree in music education from the University of Michigan in 1979.

== Career ==
For 31 years, Dodge worked as a music teacher in the Flanders Bay Community School District. She later worked for the Maine Education Association's Government Relations Committee. Dodge was elected to the Maine House of Representatives in November 2018 and assumed office on December 5, 2018. She is a member of the House Education and Cultural Affairs Committee.
