= Madison Cook =

American politician

Member-elect of the Maine House of Representatives from the 39th district
- Assuming office December 2026
- Succeeding: Janice Dodge

Personal details
- Party: Democratic

Madison Cook is an American politician. A member of the Democratic Party, she is the member-elect for the 39th district of the Maine House of Representatives. Cook serves on the Regional School Unit 71 school board.
