= Sean Flaherty (politician) =

American politician

Member of the Maine House of Representatives from the 127th district
- In office December 3, 2008 – 2010
- Preceded by: John McDonough
- Succeeded by: Amy Volk

Personal details
- Born: June 11, 1985 (age 41)
- Party: Democratic
- Profession: Government Relations

Sean Flaherty (born June 11, 1985) is an American former member of the Maine House of Representatives.

He graduated with a bachelor's degree from George Washington University in 2007. He then went on work for the American Association for Justice. On November 4, 2008, Flaherty defeated incumbent John F. McDonough, winning 56 percent of the vote. Flaherty was sworn in as a member of the Maine House of Representatives December 3, 2008.

Flaherty was an accomplished swimmer, who as of 2012, is the record-holder for the fastest time in the annual 2.4 mile (3,960 yard-freestyle) Peaks to Portland open water swim. Flaherty's time in the 2001 race was 40:30.18 which remains the fastest time in the 30 years the race has been staged.

On August 8, 2010, he was involved in a single-vehicle motor vehicle accident on Interstate 295 in Maine. He was arrested and charged with operating under the influence of alcohol.

He lost his 2010 re-election bid to Republican Amy Volk.
