= Herb Adams (politician) =

American politician

Herbert C. Adams
- Born: Herbert C. Adams
- Education: University of Southern Maine; Harvard University.
- Occupations: Historian; politician; Journalist
- Notable work: He represented the Portland neighborhoods of East Bayside and Parkside in the Maine House of Representatives.

Herbert C. Adams (born c. 1955) is an American historian, politician, and journalist from Maine. A Democrat, Adams was a member of the Portland School Committee from 1997–2004. He represented the Portland neighborhoods of East Bayside and Parkside in the Maine House of Representatives. He is also a noted historian of local history, having published Bold Vision: the History of the Portland Park System in 2000.

In 2010, term limits prevented him from seeking re-election, and the district he represented, 119, was won by independent Ben Chipman. In 2012, Chipman won re-election, turning back Adams' attempt to regain the seat, 1,884 to 1,272. A third contender in the race, Republican Gwendolyne Tuttle, received 317 votes.

He is an instructor in history at Southern Maine Community College.

He was educated at the University of Southern Maine and John F. Kennedy School of Government at Harvard University.
