= Amy Volk =

American politician (born 1969)

Member of the Maine Senate for the 30th District
- In office November 2014 – December 5, 2018
- Preceded by: Sean Flaherty
- Succeeded by: Linda Sanborn

Personal details
- Born: June 2, 1969 (age 57) Portland, Maine, U.S.
- Party: Republican
- Spouse: Derek Volk
- Education: University of Maine
- Website: Official Website

Amy Fern Volk (born June 2, 1969) is an American politician from Maine. A Republican from Scarborough, Maine, Volk was first elected to the Maine House of Representatives in 2010 when she defeated incumbent Democrat Sean Flaherty.

Seeking re-election in 2012, Volk won re-election by 12 votes over former Cumberland County District Attorney Paul Aranson.

During Volk's second term in the House, she served as the ranking minority leader of the Labor, Commerce, Research, and Economic Development Committee.

On November 4, 2014, Volk was elected to the Maine Senate to represent District 30, which comprises most of Scarborough, all of Gorham and most of Buxton. She served two terms as chair of the Labor, Commerce, Research and Economic Development Committee and as second majority Senator on the Judiciary Committee in the 127th Maine Legislature and second majority Senator on the Environment and Natural Resources Committee in the 128th.

== Senate ==
Following her second term in the House, Volk announced that she would challenge incumbent Democratic State Senator Jim Boyle.

Volk defeated Boyle by a margin of approximately 900 votes in the November 2014 general election. The Volk-Boyle race was one of the state's most watched contests. Over $330,000 was spent by outside groups in the race. Volk won despite approximately two-thirds of the outside spending seeking to benefit her opponent.

Volk was narrowly defeated for re-election in 2018 by Democratic challenger Linda Sanborn.

== Political positions ==
Volk was known as a moderate Republican who worked across the aisle on many issues, including tax reform and affordable housing issues, including consistent funding for Maine homeless shelters and lead abatement. In 2016, Volk received the Elizabeth H. Mitchell Housing Leadership Award from the Maine Affordable Housing Coalition. The award is given annually to an individual who has demonstrated outstanding leadership in addressing Maine's affordable housing problems.

As chairwoman of the legislative committee that oversees the Maine Housing Authority, Volk was deeply involved with housing issues. She passed first-in-the-nation legislation to make Maine's lead exposure standards for children consistent with the federal rules.

Volk was also a vocal supporter of the senior housing bond, which was approved by Maine voters in November 2015. The bond provides funding for the construction of senior housing across Maine, but Governor Paul LePage refused to sign off on it.

Amy Volk is best known for her achievements in calling attention to and passing legislation to address human trafficking in Maine. In 2014, Volk's legislation established an affirmative defense for victims of sex trafficking, increased penalties for johns and traffickers, and entitled victims to apply to Maine's victim compensation fund. After a controversial start, her emergency bill passed unanimously. Volk continued to address the issue in subsequent sessions, attempting to provide more support to minor victims of sex trafficking and overcoming a governor's veto in May 2018 to make forced labor a legally recognized crime in Maine.

In her time in the Senate, Amy Volk also advocated for immigrants' rights, including sponsoring an amendment that entitled asylum seekers to 24 months of General Assistance. The legislation went into law after LePage and his administration miscalculated the time they had to issue a veto.

Volk was among a handful of Republican lawmakers who called out fellow Republican Governor Paul LePage when he left an expletive-laced voicemail for a Democratic House member.

Volk was a key sponsor for a governor-opposed law exempting laid-off employees from work-search requirements in Maine's unemployment insurance law for up to six weeks, provided that their employers set a specific date for them to return to their jobs after no more than 12 weeks. Volk was a supporter of charter schools and served as a lead House sponsor of the 2011 bill which allowed up to 10 charter schools in the state. She also has worked to overhaul the state's workmen's compensation law. Her bill created a ten-year cap on benefits. It was opposed by the Maine AFL–CIO.

== Personal ==
Volk was born in Portland, Maine on June 2, 1969. She earned a B.S. in human development from the University of Maine in 1992. She and her husband Derek have four children.
