= Linda Baker =

American politician (born 1948)

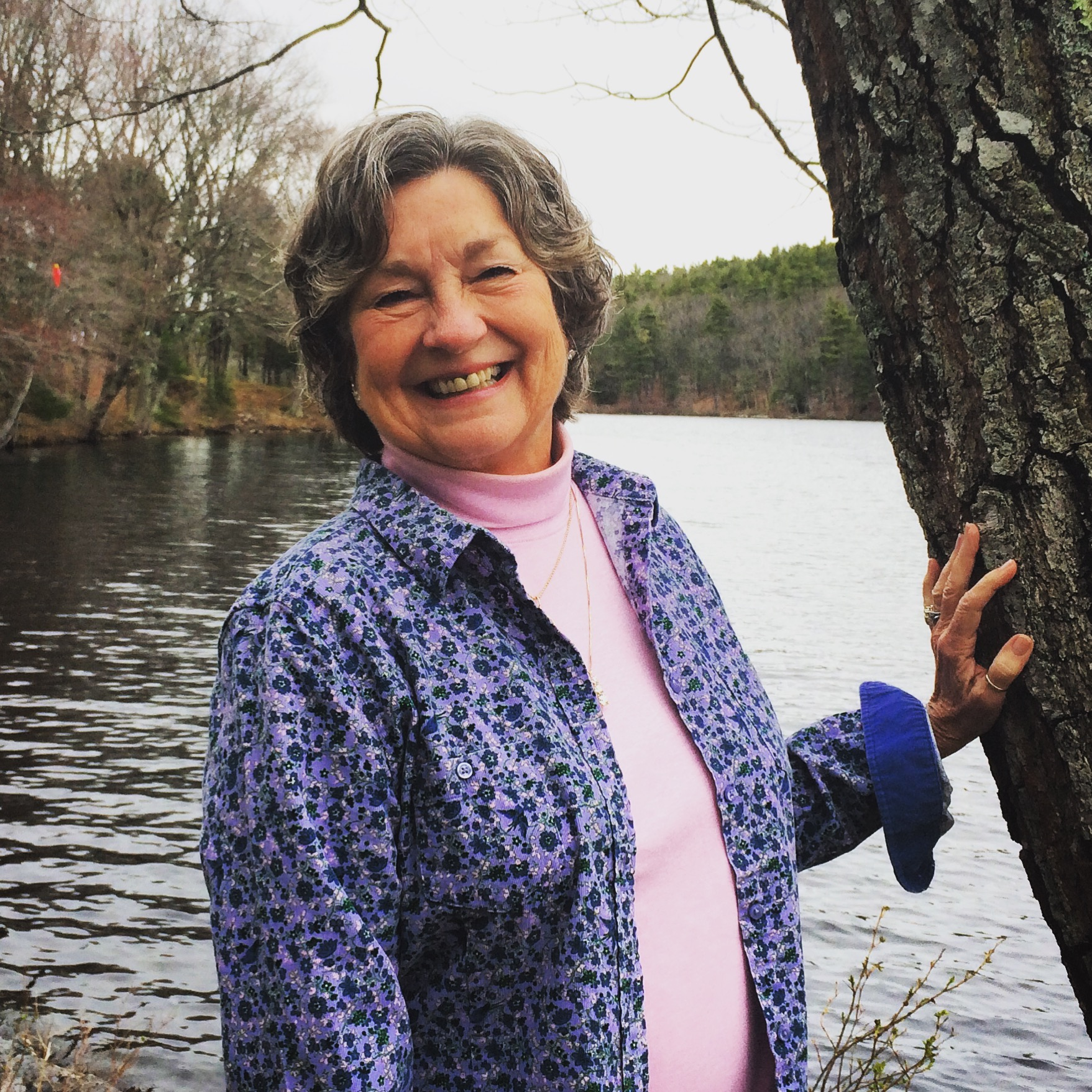

Member of the Maine Senate from the 23rd district
- In office 2014–2016
- Preceded by: Eloise Vitelli
- Succeeded by: Eloise Vitelli

Personal details
- Born: 1948 (age 77–78)
- Party: Republican
- Occupation: Teacher

Linda L. Baker (born 1948) is an American schoolteacher and politician from Maine. Baker, a Republican from Topsham, Maine, represented District 23 in the Maine Senate from 2014 to 2016. District 23 encompasses all of Sagadahoc County, Maine and the adjacent town of Dresden.

Baker taught in public schools for 31 years, including 26 at Mt. Ararat High School in Topsham. She also spent eight years on the Topsham Finance Committee and 3 years as a selectwoman on the Topsham Town Council.

== Background ==
In 2014, Baker ran against incumbent State Senator Eloise Vitelli. Vitelli had beaten former state senator Paula Benoit in a special election the year before. Ultimately, despite being outspent substantially by outside groups, Baker bested Vitelli by 1,036 votes.

As a Senator, Baker served as Chairwoman of the Joint Standing Committee on Marine Resources, the first Senator from Sagadahoc to chair the committee in decades. She was also a member of the Joint Standing Committee on Insurance and Financial Services. As a first term Senator, Baker proposed a bill to tie legislative pay to attendance. The bill ultimately passed the legislature with widespread bipartisan support and became law without the Governor's signature. Baker also received praise for "noteworthy action" from the Maine League of Conservation Voters for co-sponsoring the bipartisan Kids Safe Products Act which would dealt with toxic chemicals.

In June 2016, Baker faced Guy Lebida of Bowdoin, Maine in the Republican primary for Senate District 23. Lebida, who was endorsed by Republican Governor Paul LePage, bested Baker by just 40 votes of out approximately 2,100 cast. Baker did not request a recount. Lebida was later defeated by Eloise Vitelli by over 1,300 votes.
