= Michael Thibodeau =

Member of Maine State Senate

President of the Maine Senate
- In office December 3, 2014 – December 5, 2018
- Preceded by: Justin Alfond
- Succeeded by: Troy Jackson

Minority Leader of the Maine Senate
- In office December 5, 2012 – December 3, 2014
- Preceded by: Barry Hobbins
- Succeeded by: Justin Alfond

Member of the Maine Senate from the 11th district
- In office December 3, 2014 – December 5, 2018
- Preceded by: Richard G. Woodbury
- Succeeded by: Erin Herbig

Member of the Maine Senate from the 23rd district
- In office December 1, 2010 – December 3, 2014
- Preceded by: Carol Weston
- Succeeded by: Linda Baker

Member of the Maine House of Representatives from the 42nd district
- In office December 1, 2006 – December 1, 2010
- Preceded by: Jeffrey H. Kaelin
- Succeeded by: Peter B. Rioux

Personal details
- Born: July 16, 1966 (age 60) Winterport, Maine, U.S.
- Party: Republican
- Spouse: Stacy Thibodeau

Michael D. Thibodeau (born July 16, 1966) is an American politician and businessman from Maine. He was a Republican State Senator from Maine's 23rd District, representing all of Waldo County. He graduated from Hampden Academy in 1984. He was first elected to the Maine State Senate in 2010 after serving from 2006 to 2010 as state representative. He also served on the board of selectmen of Winterport.

== Career ==
In 2006, Thibodeau defeated Winterport Charter Commissioner Donna Gilbert after Rep. Jeffrey Kaelin withdrew. He ran as a Clean Elections candidate.

In 2008, Thibodeau, running as an incumbent, was narrowly re-elected over Seth Yentes after spending nearly $10,000 of his own money and over $13,000 overall on his re-election campaign.

An outspoken critic of same-sex marriage in Maine, Thibodeau voted against a 2009 bill to legalize it, saying "Let’s be honest. This isn’t about civil rights. It’s about a social agenda that tears at the very fabric of our society".

In 2010, Thibodeau sought District 23 in the Maine Senate, where he sought to replace fellow Republican Carol Weston. Running as a clean elections candidate, defeated fellow state representative and former House Majority Leader John Piotti with 54% of the vote in the two-way race.

In 2012, he successfully sought re-election. Following the election, which featured Republicans losing control of both the state senate and house of representatives, Thibodeau was named Republican minority leader of the Maine Senate.

Thibodeau announced on December 3, 2013, that he was considering entering the 2014 Second District congressional race.

Upon his party obtaining the majority in the November 4, 2014 legislative elections, Thibodeau was chosen to be Senate President when the new legislative session begins on December 3, 2014.

Thibodeau was reelected Senate President after his party held their majority, albeit a two-seat loss to the Democrats.

On October 17, 2017, Thibodeau announced his run for the 2018 Maine gubernatorial election.

On March 26, 2018, it was announced that Thibodeau had withdrawn from the 2018 Maine Gubernatorial Election.

Maine House of Representatives
Preceded by Jeffrey H. Kaelin	Member of the Maine House of Representatives from the 42nd district 2006–2010	Succeeded by Peter B. Rioux
Maine Senate
Preceded by Carol Weston	Member of the Maine Senate from the 23rd district 2010–2014	Succeeded by Linda Baker
Preceded by Richard G. Woodbury	Member of the Maine Senate from the 11th district 2014–2018	Succeeded by Erin Herbig
Preceded by Barry Hobbins	Minority Leader of the Maine Senate; 2012–2014	Succeeded by Justin Alfond
Political offices
Preceded by Justin Alfond	President of the Maine Senate; 2014–2018	Succeeded by Troy Jackson
