= Erin Herbig =

American politician

Member of the Maine Senate from the 11th district
- In office December 5, 2018 – December 2, 2020
- Preceded by: Michael Thibodeau
- Succeeded by: Glenn Curry

Majority Leader of the Maine House of Representatives
- In office December 7, 2016 – December 5, 2018
- Preceded by: Jeff McCabe
- Succeeded by: Matt Moonen

Member of the Maine House of Representatives from the 97th district
- In office December 3, 2014 – December 5, 2018
- Preceded by: Helen Rankin
- Succeeded by: Janice Dodge

Member of the Maine House of Representatives from the 43rd district
- In office December 1, 2010 – December 3, 2014
- Preceded by: Jane Giles
- Succeeded by: Mark Dion

Personal details
- Party: Democratic
- Education: Boston College (BA)

Erin D. Herbig is an American serving as the city manager of the city of Belfast, Maine. She previously served as a member of the Maine Senate and Maine House of Representatives. Herbig earned a Bachelor of Arts degree in English from Boston College in 2003 and is a graduate of the Emerge program, which trains Democratic women to run for office.
