= Heather Sanborn =

American politician and attorney

Member of the Maine Senate from the 28th district
- In office December 2018 – December 7, 2022
- Preceded by: Mark Dion
- Succeeded by: Jill Duson

Member of the Maine House of Representatives from the 43rd district
- In office 2016–2018
- Preceded by: Mark Dion
- Succeeded by: W. Edward Crockett

Personal details
- Party: Democratic
- Spouse: Nathan Sanborn
- Children: 1
- Education: Middlebury College (BA); University of Southern Maine (MS); University of Maine School of Law (JD)
- Profession: Teacher; Attorney; Business director
- Website: heathersanborn.mainecandidate.com

Heather B. Sanborn is an American politician, attorney, and businesswoman, serving as the Maine Public Advocate since 2025. She previously was a member of the Maine House of Representatives from 2016 to 2018, and a member of the Maine Senate from 2018 to 2022, representing District 28 (portions of the cities of Portland and Westbrook). She is a member of the Democratic Party.

She previously worked as an attorney for the law firms Ropes & Gray and Brann & Isaacson. Sanborn and her husband founded Rising Tide Brewery, where she served as director of business operations from its founding in 2010 until 2024, when they sold the brewery.

== Early life and education ==
Sanborn grew up in Portland, Maine. She attended Middlebury College, from which she graduated summa cum laude as the salutatorian of her class in 1997 with a Bachelor of Arts in Political Science. In 2004, she received a Master of Science in Educational Leadership from the University of Southern Maine, and then taught social studies at Cape Elizabeth High School.

Sanborn graduated from the University of Maine School of Law in 2007. There, she was the editor-in-chief of the Maine Law Review.

== Legal career ==
She subsequently worked as a law clerk to Judge Kermit Lipez on the U.S. Court of Appeals for the First Circuit. She next worked as an associate in the litigation department at Ropes & Gray for almost three years. Sanborn then practiced law at the law firm Brann & Isaacson in Lewiston, Maine.

She has served on the boards of directors of the Portland Development Corporation, University Credit Union, and Universal Service Administrative Company.

== Brewery; beer industry advocacy ==
=== Rising Tide Brewery (2010–24) ===
Sanborn and her husband, Nathan Sanborn, co-founded and co-owned Rising Tide Brewery in Portland, and she served as its director of business operations from its founding in 2010 until 2024. The brewery opened in 2010 and relocated to a larger space in 2012. As of 2020, Rising Tide employed 29 people and produced 4,500 barrels of beer per year.

In December 2024, the Sanborns sold Rising Tide Brewing Company to Oxbow Brewing Company, ensuring at the same time that the brand and the staff remained intact.

=== 2012 tasting room law ===
Sanborn served as the President of the Maine Brewers' Guild, and has drawn on her law background to advocate for breweries around Maine. She advocated for state-level law changes that benefit Maine's craft beer industry. In collaboration with the Maine Brewer's Guild, she drafted the text of and submitted a bill to the 125th Maine Legislature that permitted breweries to sell their products on-site. At the time, Maine breweries were only permitted to give away small samples of their beer, a business model which Sanborn and other industry leaders argued was not conducive to customer interaction and beer tourism. The bill, LD #1889, was signed into law in April 2012.

== Political career ==
=== Maine House of Representatives (2016–18) ===
Sanborn ran unopposed in the 2016 Maine House of Representatives District 43 Democratic primary. She then defeated Republican opponent Jeffrey Langholtz 65%–35% in the general election.

Sanborn was appointed to the Insurance and Financial Services Committee, and the Energy, Utilities and Technology Committee. She was also Co-Chair of the Maine Legislature’s Health Care Task Force.

=== Maine Senate (2018–22) ===
In June 2018, Sanborn ran for the Maine Senate. She won a contested primary with 59% of the vote against Portland City Councilor Jill Duson to represent Maine's 28th State Senate District, covering parts of Portland and Westbrook. She then won the general election.

In 2020, Sanborn ran for re-election to the Maine Senate. She ran unopposed in both the Democratic primary and in the general election, and was elected to her second term representing District 28 in the Maine Senate.

During her second term in the Maine Senate, Sanborn served as the Chair of the Joint Standing Committee on Health Coverage, Insurance, and Financial Services. She sponsored and successfully enacted LD 1783, which banned health insurance companies from using "copay accumulator" programs that effectively double-billed patients for prescription drugs. In addition, Sanborn fought for the Dental Insurance Value Act under LD 1266, which created strict financial reporting mandates for dental insurers to make certain that premium revenues were spent on patient care instead of administrative overhead. She also sponsored successful legislation (LD 340) meant to lower energy costs for families and small businesses, while at the same time aligning with Maine's energy efficiency targets.

Sanborn chose not to seek re-election in 2022.

=== Maine Public Advocate (2025–present) ===
Following her time in the legislature, Maine Governor Janet Mills nominated Sanborn to serve as the Maine Public Advocate. The Maine Senate confirmed her appointment to the role on January 28, 2025, to represent utility customers before regulators.

== Personal life ==
As of 2018, Sanborn and her husband and son lived in Portland.

== Electoral record ==
=== Maine State House ===
2016 Maine House District 28 General Election
Party	Candidate	Votes	%
Democratic	Heather Sanborn	3,632	65.0%
Republican	Jeffrey Langholtz	1,957	35.0%
Total votes		5,589	100.0%
Democratic hold			

=== Maine State Senate ===
2018 Maine Senate District 28 Democratic Primary
Party	Candidate	Votes	%
Democratic	Heather Sanborn	3.093	58.6%
Democratic	Jill Duson	2,188	41.4%
Total votes		5,281	100.0%

2018 Maine Senate District 28 General Election
Party	Candidate	Votes	%
Democratic	Heather Sanborn	15,940	81.0%
Independent	Write-in candidates	3,729	19.0%
Total votes		24,796	100.0%
Democratic hold			

2020 Maine Senate District 25 General Election
Party	Candidate	Votes	%
Democratic	Heather Sanborn	20,173	100.0%
Total votes		20,173	100.0%
Democratic hold			
