= Linda Sanborn =

American physician and politician

Member of the Maine Senate from the 30th district
- In office December 5, 2018 – December 2, 2020
- Preceded by: Amy Volk
- Succeeded by: Stacy Brenner

Member of the Maine House of Representatives
- In office December 3, 2014 – December 7, 2016
- Preceded by: Paul Davis
- Succeeded by: Maureen Terry
- Constituency: 26th district
- In office December 3, 2008 – December 3, 2014
- Preceded by: Dave Farrington
- Succeeded by: Richard Campbell
- Constituency: 130th district

Personal details
- Born: December 30, 1951 (age 74) Aurora, Illinois
- Party: Democratic
- Education: Michigan State University
- Profession: Family physician

Linda F. Sanborn (born December 30, 1951) is an American physician and politician from Maine. Sanborn, a Democrat from Gorham, served in the Maine House of Representatives from December 2008 until December 2016 and in the Maine Senate from 2018 to 2020.

Sanborn was born in Aurora, Illinois and earned a B.S. from Michigan State University in 1974 and her M.D. at the University of Illinois at Chicago in 1978.
