= Ben Chipman =

American politician from Maine

Member of the Maine State Senate for the 27th District
- In office December 2016 – December 2024
- Preceded by: Justin Alfond

Member of the Maine House of Representatives for the 40th District
- In office December 2010 – December 2016
- Preceded by: Herb Adams
- Succeeded by: Rachel Talbot Ross

Personal details
- Born: Brunswick, Maine
- Party: Democratic (2015-present); Unenrolled (2010-2015); Green Independent (2002-2009)
- Education: University of Maine
- Profession: Community organizer Landlord
- Website: Campaign website

Ben Chipman is an American Democratic politician from Maine. He was a member of the Maine Senate representing District 27, comprising part of Portland, Maine from 2016 to 2024. Chipman served in the Maine House of Representatives from December 2010 until December 2016 as an independent, and since December 2016 he has served as a member of the Maine Senate as a Democrat.

== Early life and education ==
Chipman earned a degree in liberal arts from the University of Maine in 1997. His professional experience includes working as a community organizer and as a legislative aide, and as of 2018 he was working as an independent notary for real estate closings.

== Political career ==
Chipman worked as an aide in the Office of the Clerk at the Maine State House beginning in 2002. From 2009 to 2010, he served on Portland's Charter Commission, which was tasked with rewriting the city's charter, and from 2002 to 2006 he was a legislative aide to John Eder. Chipman was a founding member of the Portland Green Independent Committee.

=== Maine House ===
Chipman first ran for Maine House District 119, representing Portland's Parkside, Bayside, and East Bayside neighborhoods, in 2010. Throughout his first term, he was the only independent in the Maine House of Representatives.

In 2012, Chipman faced Herb Adams (politician), who had held the District 119 seat until 2010. He was re-elected with 54% of the vote, defeating Adams and Republican Gwen Tuttle. He was joined by fellow unenrolled lawmakers Jeffrey Evangelos, Joseph E. Brooks and James J. Campbell in the Maine House.

In January 2013, Chipman, Brooks and Evangelos met with Governor Paul LePage to discuss balancing the state budget. During the meeting, LePage grew agitated, used profanity and abruptly exited.

Chipman was re-elected to the Maine House in 2014, receiving nearly 60% of the vote in a three-way race.

On September 4, 2015, Chipman announced that he was joining the Democratic Party. He stated that one of his priorities was to hold LePage accountable for his behavior, and by joining the majority party in the Maine House of Representatives, Chipman would be in a better position to accomplish that goal. He was one of three members of the Maine House who requested an investigation of LePage for using $530,000 of taxpayer funds to pressure a private school into firing their new president, a political rival of the Governor. The state's Government Oversight Committee unanimously voted to launch the investigation, and Chipman led an effort to impeach LePage. In January 2016, Republican House Speaker Ken Fredette's motion to preempt the impeachment was debated and the debate was tabled indefinitely.

=== Maine Senate ===
After a contentious Democratic primary in 2016,, Chipman won 53% of the vote in the Maine Senate District 27 three-way general election, and he was re-elected in 2018, 2020 and finally 2022.

In April 2021, Chipman introduced LD #1123, "An Act To Authorize a Memorial to the Victims of COVID-19" authorizing the Capitol Park Commission to erect a monument to honor Maine victims of the COVID-19 pandemic.

== Personal life ==
Chipman was a 2021 board member of Amistad Peer Support and Recovery, a Portland nonprofit. He lives with his partner, City Councilor and former MGIP chairperson Anna Trevorrow.

== Electoral results ==
=== Maine House ===
2010 Maine House District 119 General Election
Party	Candidate	Votes	%
Independent	Ben Chipman	1,113	54.2%
Democratic	Jill Barkley	941	45.8%
Total votes		2,054	100.0%

2012 Maine House District 119 General Election
Party	Candidate	Votes	%
Independent	Ben Chipman	1,904	54.2%
Democratic	Herbert Adams	1,287	36.7%
Republican	Gwendolyne Tuttle	320	9.1%
Total votes		3,511	100%

2014 Maine House District 40 General Election
Party	Candidate	Votes	%
Independent	Ben Chipman	1,567	57.8%
Democratic	Herbert Adams	959	35.4%
Republican	Mark Lockman	186	6.9%
Total votes		2,712	100%

=== Maine Senate ===
2016 Maine Senate District 27 Democratic Primary
Party	Candidate	Votes	%
Democratic	Ben Chipman	1,778	53.0%
Democratic	Charles Radis	797	23.8%
Democratic	Diane Russell	777	23.2%
Total votes		3.352	100%

2016 Maine Senate District 27 General Election
Party	Candidate	Votes	%
Democratic	Ben Chipman	14,929	67.2
Green	Seth Baker	3,712	16.7
Republican	Adam Pontius	3.562	16.0%
Total votes		22,203	100%

2018 Maine Senate District 27 Democratic Primary
Party	Candidate	Votes	%
Democratic	Ben Chipman	6,014	100.0%%
Total votes		6,014	100.0%

2018 Maine Senate District 27 General Election
Party	Candidate	Votes	%
Democratic	Ben Chipman	14,858	74.9%
Independent	Crystal Canney	4,975	25.1%
Total votes		19.833	100%

2020 Maine Senate District 27 Democratic Primary
Party	Candidate	Votes	%
Democratic	Ben Chipman	9,123	100.0%
Total votes		9,123	100.0%

2020 Maine Senate District 27 General Election
Party	Candidate	Votes	%
Democratic	Ben Chipman	21,813	100%
Total votes		21,813	100%
